= Revamped =

2023 remix album by Demi Lovato

Remix album (re-recorded) by Demi Lovato
- Released: September 15, 2023
- Recorded: 2022–2023
- Genre: Rock
- Length: 35:49
- Label: Island
- Producer: Warren "Oak" Felder

Demi Lovato chronology
Holy Fvck (2022)	Revamped (2023)	It's Not That Deep (2025)

Singles from Revamped
- 1. "Heart Attack" Released: March 24, 2023; 2. "Cool for the Summer" Released: May 25, 2023

Revamped is the first remix album by the American singer Demi Lovato, released on September 15, 2023, through Island Records. Warren "Oak" Felder entirely produced it, while Alex Niceforo and Keith Sorrells received additional credits. The album comprises ten re-recorded renditions of songs from Lovato's previous albums, reworked into rock-leaning production. It served as a follow-up to her return to the genre with her 2022 studio album Holy Fvck, and contains elements of pop-punk and other styles. The musicians Slash, Nita Strauss, Bert McCracken, and the band the Maine appear as featured artists.

Lovato promoted Revamped with performances at several festivals and made a televised appearance at the 2023 MTV Video Music Awards, where she sang the singles "Heart Attack" and "Cool for the Summer", as well as the promotional single "Sorry Not Sorry". Upon release, the album received mostly positive reviews from music critics; many of them described it as a fun record, although some did not find drastic changes to the original songs. Commercially, Revamped peaked within the top 30 on the national charts of Flanders, Scotland, and Spain, as well as the top 60 in the United States and the United Kingdom.

== Background ==
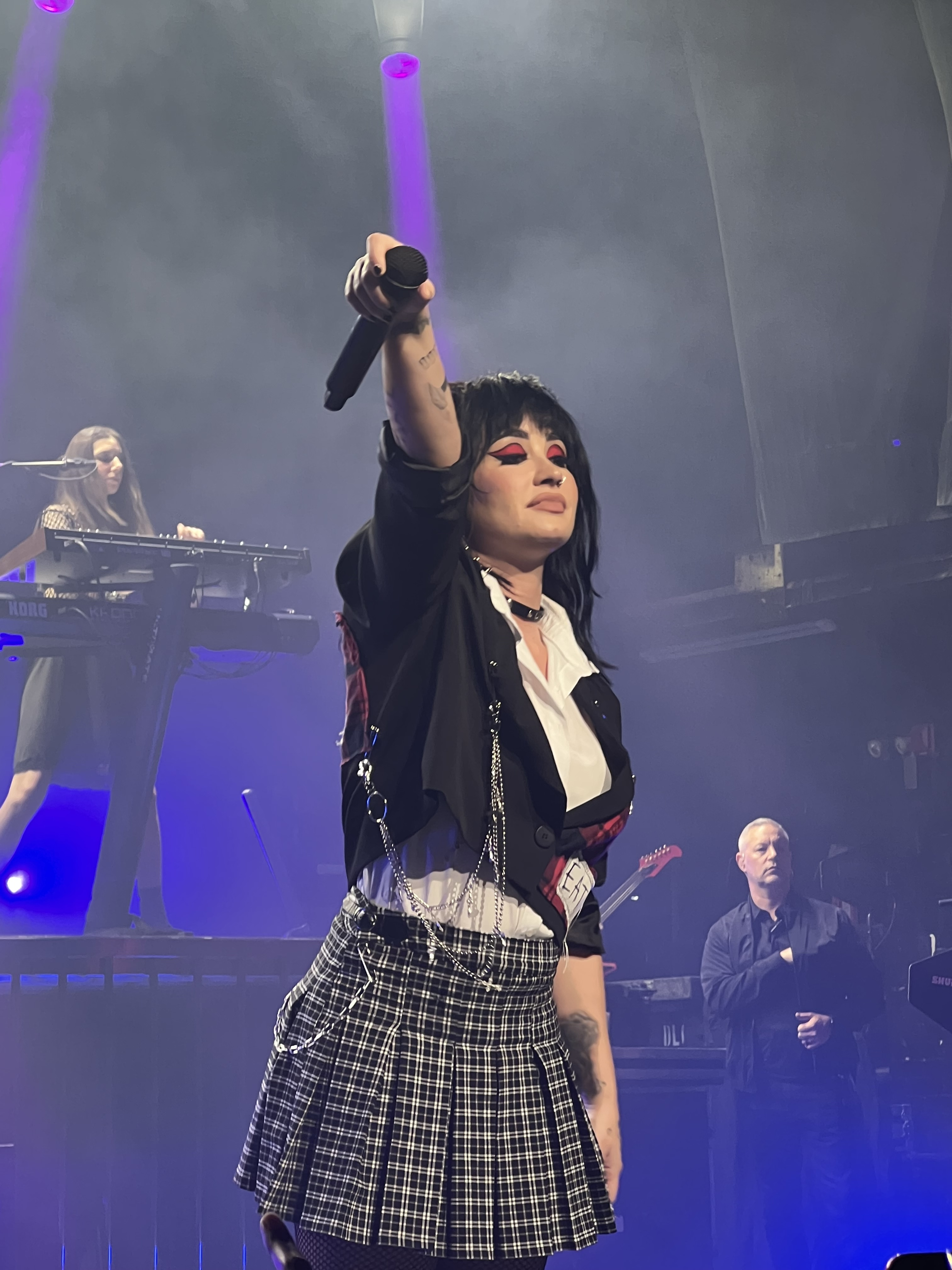
Demi Lovato performing at the Holy Fvck Tour in 2022.

Demi Lovato has experimented with several music genres in her career; she started it with pop rock before shifting to "mainstream pop". She expressed her admiration to rock, metal, and alternative music throughout the years. Lovato's eighth studio album, Holy Fvck, was released in 2022 and described by critics as "her heaviest work yet", drawing from pop-punk and hard rock. Before its release, she staged a "funeral" for her pop music in social media. It was entirely produced by Warren "Oak" Felder. Lovato supported the album with the Holy Fvck Tour in the same year. She performed several songs from her music catalog with a rock rearrangement, to match her then-current sound and style. Lovato toured with a band that included the American guitarist Nita Strauss. The tour was received positively, and it led Lovato to consider re-recording some of her older singles. In an interview with Rolling Stone's Tomás Mier, she said: "When I got home from tour, I was like, 'Why don't I just record those versions and release them?".

== Production ==
For Revamped, Lovato returned to work with Felder. He is credited in all the tracks as the producer, with collaboration from Alex Niceforo, Keith "Ten4" Sorrells, Mitch Allan, Oscar Linnander, Zaire Koalo, Chopsticks, and John Feldmann. The album contains 10 re-recorded versions of songs previously included on the albums Don't Forget (2008), Unbroken (2011), Demi (2013), Confident (2015), and Tell Me You Love Me (2017). The songs were conceived as "rock versions". Lovato made Revamped in order to reflect the changes in her life, and stated that it allowed her to reconnect with the songs as she had felt tired of singing them live. Discussing the album, she said: "I wanted to pay homage to the songs that resonated the most with fans and played a big role in my career by breathing an exciting new life into them." Lovato added extra high notes to the songs, that felt that were "easier to record, just because [she has] been singing them for so many years".

Revamped contains four collaborations: the British and American guitarist Slash joins Lovato on "Sorry Not Sorry", Strauss is credited as a featured artist on the remix of "La La Land", the American band the Maine collaborated on "Neon Lights", and the American singer Bert McCracken of the Used appears on the duet of "Give Your Heart a Break". Lovato revealed that "Tell Me You Love Me" was the most difficult song to re-record and re-imagine as a rock track, citing its "soulful" sound. She told Zach Sang that some songs were excluded from the final track listing, including "Get Back" and "Really Don't Care".

== Composition ==
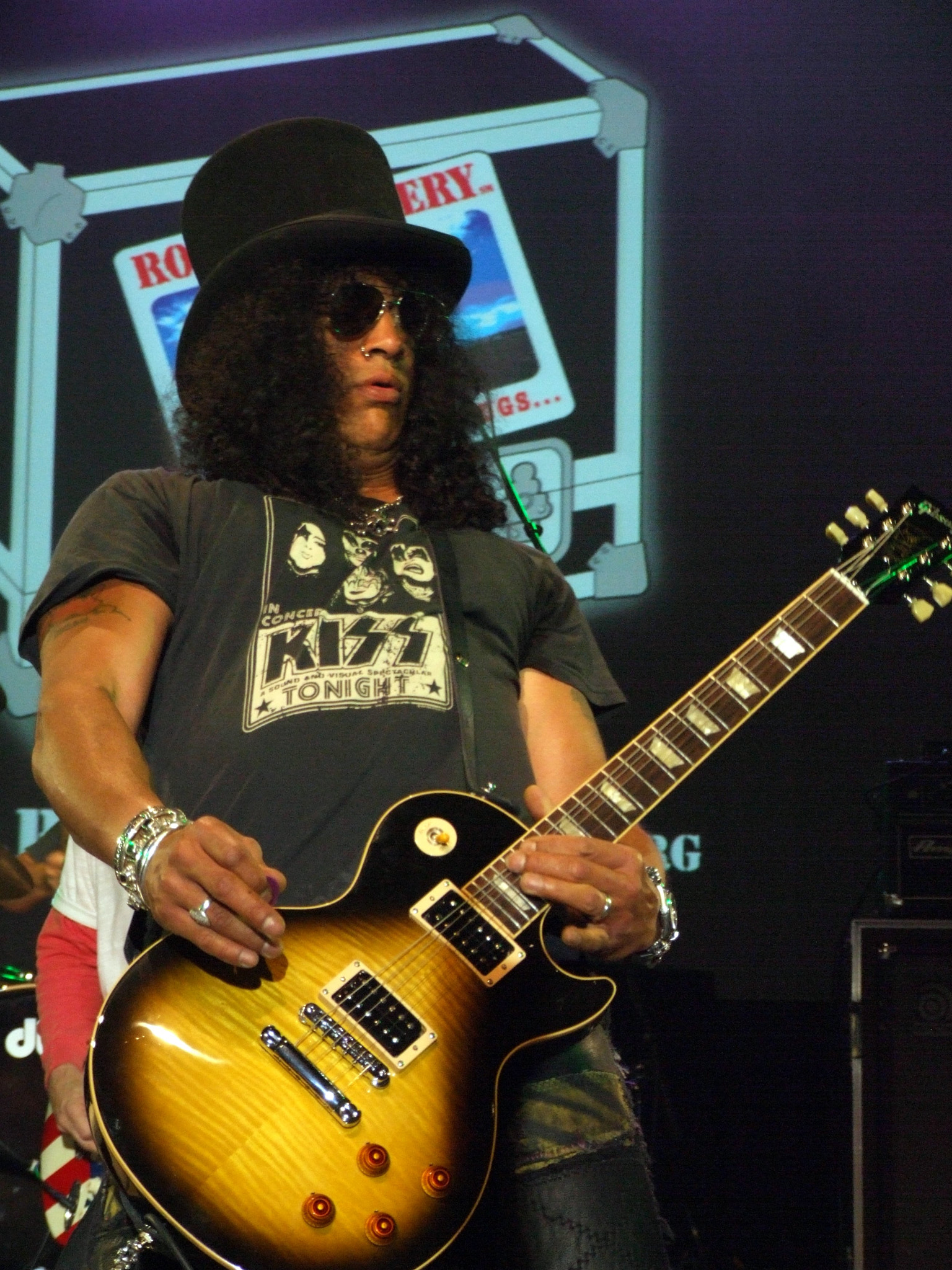
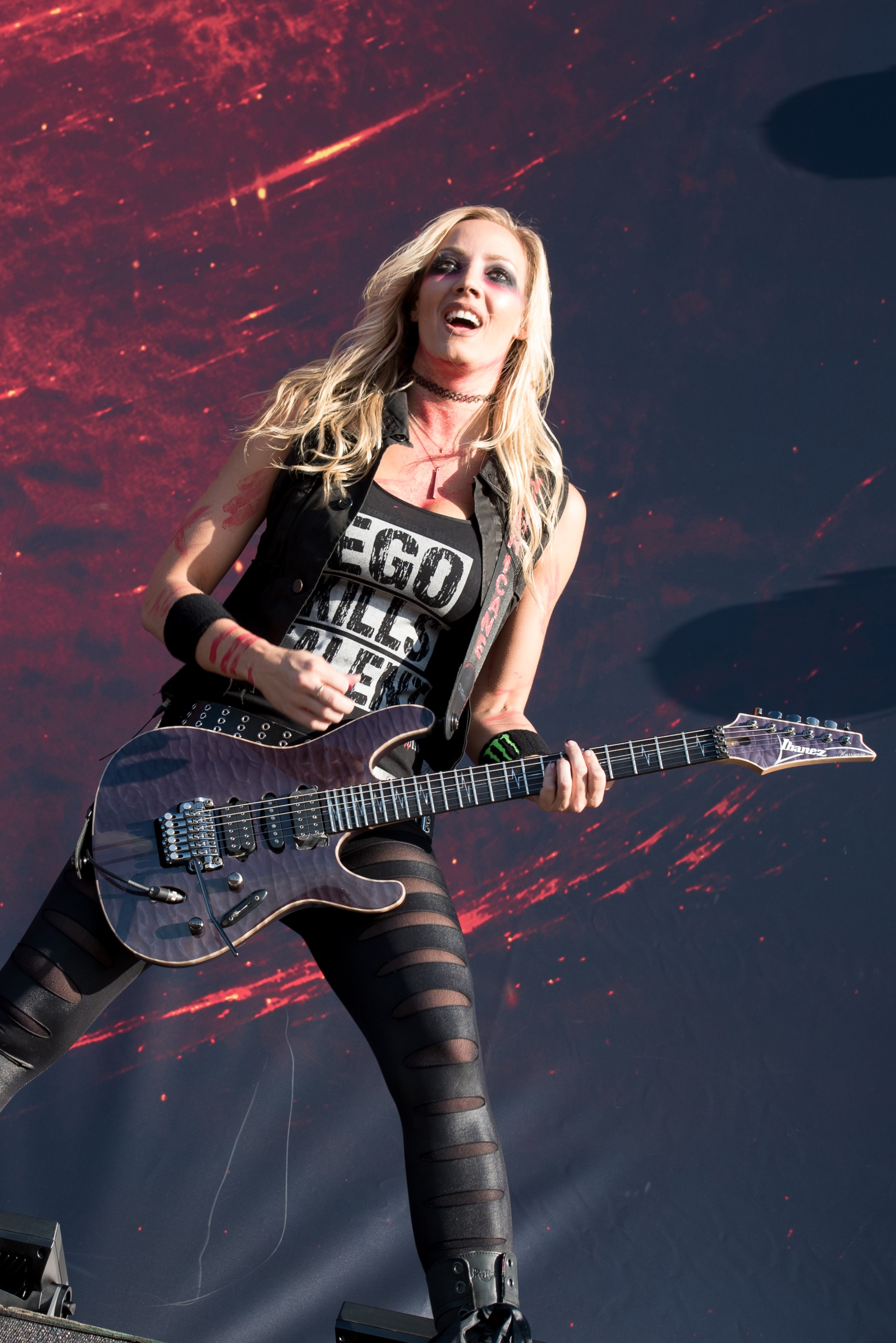
The musicians Slash (left) and Nita Strauss (right) provide guitar solos on the remixes of "Sorry Not Sorry" and "La La Land", respectively.

Musically, Revamped is a rock album that follows Lovato's genre shift with Holy Fvck. It contains perceived elements of pop-punk, electronic rock and alt-rock. Revamped opens with the remix of "Heart Attack", a punk rock song with lyrics about avoiding to fall in love. It changes the original tempo of the verses and features guitar riffs. The second track, "Confident", is a glam rock song. The Paste writer Allison McClain Merrill connected the lyric "I used to hold my freak back, but I'm letting go" with the opening line from "Freak", Holy Fvck's opening track. "Sorry Not Sorry" is also glam rock, and contains a metal scream in the lyric "Wait a minute", which was not made by Lovato in order to not damage her voice. Slash appears in the bridge with a guitar solo. "Cool for the Summer" is a metalcore song that starts with synthesizers and static sound before a drum beat and electric guitars are introduced. The remix contains a change in the lyric "Don't tell your mother", which was replaced with "Go tell your mother"; Lovato stated that it was made to reflect pride in her sexuality.

The fifth track, "Tell Me You Love Me", is a stadium rock power ballad. McClain Merrill said that it is a quiet moment between the "harder, louder" songs on the album. Its outro was made with a vocoder. Before the lyric "No, you ain't nobody 'till you got somebody" in "Tell Me You Love Me", Lovato sings "They say". When discussing this, Lovato stated that she did not want to retain the original's "negative connotation", which "always bugged [her]" while performing it live. "Neon Lights", the collaboration with the Maine, is a dance rock song with techno and emo countermelodies. The stadium rock "Skyscraper" begins with soft organ chords, which leads to the chorus that is "a promise of survival": "Go on and try to tear me down / I will be rising from the ground / Like a skyscraper". "La La Land" is an "old-fashioned" rock & roll song, which contains an electric guitar solo from Strauss. While the original version was already rock-infused, punk rock elements and staccato guitar lines were added. Opossed to the first track, "Give Your Heart a Break" explores the feeling of being doubtful in a romantic relationship. "Don't Forget" closes the album. The original version was also inspired by rock music, and the rearranged version is led by guitar and piano.

== Promotion and release ==
"Heart Attack" was released on March 24, 2023, as the first remix from the album, to mark the song's 10th anniversary. The second single, "Cool for the Summer", was released on May 25 of the same year, announced via social media on May 18. On July 14, 2023, Lovato released "Sorry Not Sorry" as the first promotional single from the album and subsequently announced Revamped on her social media accounts. The album announcement was supported by the release of an album trailer, with a snippet of the singles serving as the background music to a series of clips of Lovato in a photoshoot. On the same date, Rolling Stone revealed that "Give Your Heart a Break" and "Tell Me You Love Me" would be featured on the album. The remix of "Confident" was released on August 18, announced as part of the track listing three days before its release.

At the 2023 MTV Video Music Awards, Lovato performed a medley of the remixes of "Heart Attack", "Sorry Not Sorry", and "Cool for the Summer". She was accompanied by Constance Antoinette on guitar, Leanne Bowes on bass, and Brittany Bowman on drums. It was chosen by USA Today and Billboard as one of the best performances of the ceremony. She also performed at several festivals, such as Philadelphia Welcome America Festival, Wonderbus Music & Arts Festival, and The Town Festival. Revamped was released as Lovato's first remix album on September 15, 2023. It was issued to vinyl LP, CD, and digital formats.

== Commercial performance ==
Upon its release, Revamped peaked within the top 20 in Scotland (14), and in the Flanders region of Belgium (20). The album charted at number 27 in Spain, number 59 in the United Kingdom, number 60 in the United States, number 71 in Belgium's Wallonia, and number 120 in France. In the US, Revamped reached 11,000 pure album sales in its first week. It additionally debuted at number 8 on Top Alternative Albums and 10 on Top Rock Albums.

== Critical reception ==
Professional ratings
Aggregate scores
Source	Rating
Metacritic	74/100
Review scores
Source	Rating
AllMusic	3.5/5 stars
American Songwriter	3.5/5 stars
Clash	8/10
The Line of Best Fit	4/10
Paste	8/10
PopMatters	8/10
Riff	8/10

Revamped received generally positive reviews from critics. On the review aggregator site Metacritic, which assigns which assigns a normalized rating from publications, the album received a weighted average score of 74 out of 100 based on 6 reviews, indicating "generally favorable" reception. Stephen Daw from Billboard described Revamped as "the work of an artist taking the narrative back from her years of pop stardom".

Lovato's vocal performance was highly praised by critics, with American Songwriter's Alex Hopper calling them "strong as ever". Several reviewers described Revamped as a fun project, including Jeffrey Davies of PopMatters and Neil Z. Young of AllMusic. The former praised the sound as natural, while the latter lauded the diversity of Lovato's music catalog. It was named a nostalgic album by McClain Merrill and Clash's Ims Taylor; the former described it as an experiment. Additionally, a few critics thought that Revamped would be well received by fans. The remixes of "Skyscraper" and "Don't Forget" were highlighted as standouts.

On the other hand, some reviewers believed that the album did not meet initial expectations. Hopper opined that the songs do not contain drastic changes to the original versions. Vicky Greer from The Line of Best Fit agreed, while writing that the album was a disappointment and a "musical step backwards in [Lovato's] career", containing missed opportunities. She described it as "formulaic rock" and criticized its production, although lauded the participation of Slash and Strauss. McClain Merrill similarly admired the collaborations on the album.

== Track listing ==
Revamped track listing
No.	Title	Writer(s)	Producer(s)	Length
1.	"Heart Attack" (from Demi)	Demi Lovato; Aaron Philips; Jason Evigan; Mitch Allan; Nikki Williams; Sean Douglas	Oak Felder; Alex Niceforo^{[a]}; Keith Sorrells^{[a]}; Allan^{[a]}	3:59
2.	"Confident" (from Confident)	Lovato; Ilya Salmanzadeh; Max Martin; Savan Kotecha	Felder; Niceforo^{[a]}; Sorrells^{[a]}	3:25
3.	"Sorry Not Sorry" (featuring Slash; from Tell Me You Love Me)	Lovato; Douglas; Trevor Brown; Felder; Zaire Koalo	Felder; Niceforo^{[a]}; Sorrells^{[a]}; Brown^{[a]}; Koalo^{[a]}	3:34
4.	"Cool for the Summer" (from Confident)	Lovato; Alexander Kronlund; Ali Payami; Martin; Kotecha	Felder; Niceforo^{[a]}; Sorrells^{[a]}	3:32
5.	"Tell Me You Love Me" (from Tell Me You Love Me)	Kirby Lauryen; Ajay Bhattacharya; John Hill	Felder; Niceoforo^{[a]}; Sorrells^{[a]}	3:47
6.	"Neon Lights" (with the Maine; from Demi)	Lovato; Mario Marchetti; Tiffany Vartanyan; Ryan Tedder; Noel Zancanella	Felder; Niceforo^{[a]}; Sorrells^{[a]}; Chopsticks^{[a]}	3:52
7.	"Skyscraper" (from Unbroken)	Toby Gad; Lindy Robbins; Kerli Kõiv	Felder; Niceforo^{[a]}; Sorrells^{[a]}; Oscar Linnander^{[a]}	3:33
8.	"La La Land" (featuring Nita Strauss; from Don't Forget)	Lovato; Nick Jonas; Joe Jonas; Kevin Jonas II	Felder; Niceforo^{[a]}; Sorrells^{[a]}	3:13
9.	"Give Your Heart a Break" (with Bert McCracken of the Used; from Unbroken)	Josh Alexander; Billy Steinberg	Felder; Niceforo^{[a]}; Sorrells^{[a]}; John Feldmann^{[a]}	3:20
10.	"Don't Forget" (from Don't Forget)	Lovato; N. Jonas; J. Jonas; K. Jonas	Felder; Niceforo^{[a]}; Sorrells^{[a]}	3:34
Total length:				35:49

=== Notes ===
- ^{^[a]} indicates a co-producer
- All tracks are subtitled "rock version".

== Personnel ==
The personnel is adapted from the album's liner notes.

- Demi Lovato – lead vocals
- Oak Felder – producer, programming (1, 3), keyboards (2–10), bass (3), engineer (4)
- Alex Nice – co-producer, programming (1–3, 5–10), keyboards (3), percussion (4), strings (4), guitar (8–10)
- Keith "Ten4" Sorrells – co-producer, programming (1, 4), mixing, guitar, drums, bass (2–10)
- Oscar Linnander – engineer, co-producer (7), programming (7), bass (7), keyboards (7)
- Mitch Allan – co-producer (1), guitar (1), background vocals (1)
- Trevor Brown – co-producer (3), guitar (3)
- Zaire Koalo – co-producer (3), percussion (3)
- Slash – guitar (3)
- Chopsticks – co-producer (6), programming (6), guitar (6, 7)
- Nita Strauss – guitar (8)
- John Feldmann – co-producer (9)
- Chris Gehringer – mastering
- Will Quinnell – mastering

== Charts ==
Chart performance for Revamped
Chart (2023)	Peak position
Belgian Albums (Ultratop Flanders)	20
Belgian Albums (Ultratop Wallonia)	71
French Albums (SNEP)	120
Scottish Albums (Official Charts)	14
Spanish Albums (Promusicae)	27
UK Albums (Official Charts)	59
US Billboard 200	60
US Top Alternative Albums (Billboard)	8
US Top Rock Albums (Billboard)	10
