= Skin of my teeth =

Phrase from the Bible

Skin of my teeth (Hebrew: עוֹר שִׁנָּי ‘ōr šinnāy) is a phrase from the Bible. In Job 19:20, the King James Version of the Bible says, "My bone cleaveth to my skin and to my flesh, and I am escaped with the skin of my teeth." In the Geneva Bible, the phrase is rendered as "I have escaped with the skinne of my tethe."

The verse can be resolved as follows: In the first clause, the author uses the Hebrew `or in its usual sense of "skin", associating it with "flesh" and "bones". In the second clause, he uses the Hebrew or as derived from the Arabic ghar, "the bones in which the teeth are set (Latin: os maxilla and os mandibula)". Therefore, Blumenthal argues, the correct reading is: "My skin and flesh cling to my bones, and I am left with (only) my skull", giving a stark description of the advanced stage of Job's disease.

In modern times, "by the skin of my teeth" is used to describe a situation from which one has barely managed to escape or achieve something; a close call.

== Cultural references to the phrase ==
- Skin o' My Tooth – 1928 book by Baroness Emma Orczy in which the phrase is a nickname of the main character, a lawyer; the nickname is given by a client who says that he was freed "by the skin o' my tooth"
- The Skin of Our Teeth – 1942 play by Thornton Wilder with multiple Biblical allusions
- "Skin o' My Teeth" – song on Megadeth's 1992 album Countdown to Extinction, referring to the theme of a suicide attempt
- a reference to the quote in the song Alone, the 3rd track on Biting Elbows' 2020 album Shortening the Longing, talking about a bad break-up situation
- "Skin of Her Teeth" – 2021 TV episode in Dexter: New Blood limited series in the Jeff Lindsay Dexter serial killer franchise
- "Skin of My Teeth" – song from Demi Lovato's 2022 album Holy Fvck
- "Skin on Our Teeth" – song from the Left 4 Dead franchise which plays at the end of every campaign's finale

== See also ==
- Hair's breadth
