= Heart Attack (Demi Lovato song) =

2013 single by Demi Lovato

Single by Demi Lovato

from the album Demi
- Released: February 25, 2013
- Genre: Electropop; power pop
- Length: 3:30
- Label: Hollywood
- Songwriters: Demi Lovato; Mitch Allan; Jason Evigan; Sean Douglas; Nikki Williams; Aaron Philips
- Producer: The Suspex

Demi Lovato singles chronology
"Give Your Heart a Break" (2012)	"Heart Attack" (2013)	"Made in the USA" (2013)

Music video
- "Heart Attack" on YouTube

"Heart Attack" is a song recorded by American singer Demi Lovato. It was released on February 25, 2013, as the lead single from her fourth studio album, Demi (2013). The song was produced by Mitch Allan and Jason Evigan of The Suspex, who co-wrote the song along with Lovato, Sean Douglas, Nikki Williams, and Aaron Phillips. "Heart Attack" is an electropop song that employs cardiac motifs to represent the fear of falling in love. It received acclaim from music critics, many of whom complimented its lyrics and Lovato's vocals.

The song sold 215,000 copies in the US in its first week, her best sales week for a song download, and peaked at number ten on the US Billboard Hot 100, becoming Lovato's second solo top-ten single on the chart. It was later certified 6× platinum by the Recording Industry Association of America (RIAA). "Heart Attack" also performed well internationally, reaching the top 10 in Canada, Ireland, Lebanon, New Zealand, Scotland, and the United Kingdom.

An accompanying music video for "Heart Attack" was directed by Chris Applebaum and premiered through Vevo on April 9, 2013. Lovato has performed the track on several television programs and included it on the set lists for all of her headlining concert tours from the Neon Lights Tour (2014) to the Holy Fvck Tour (2023). For the song's tenth anniversary, Lovato re-recorded "Heart Attack" and included it on her first remix album, Revamped (2023).

== Background and release ==
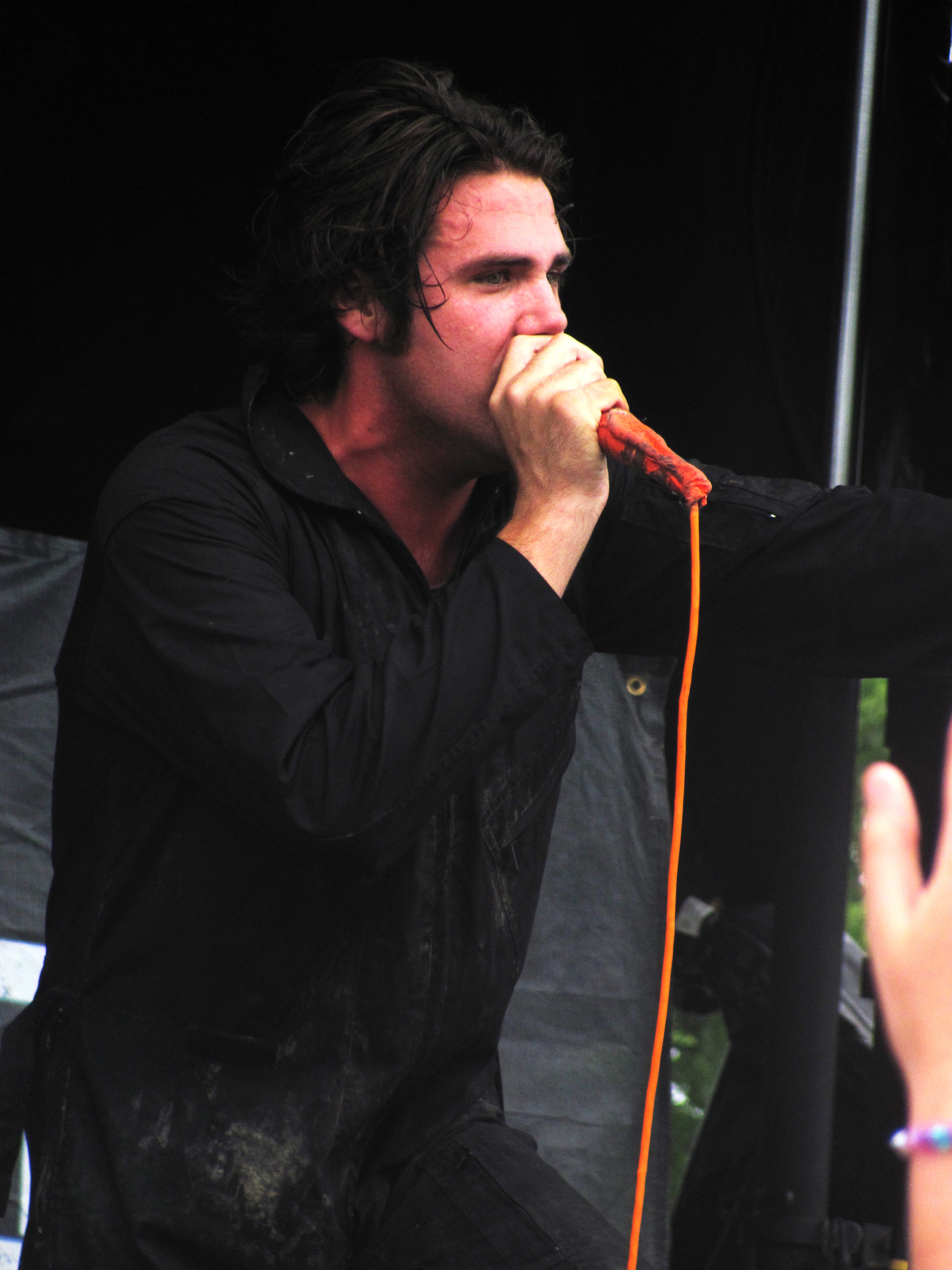
Jason Evigan (pictured) co-wrote and co-produced "Heart Attack".

"Heart Attack" was produced by Mitch Allan and Jason Evigan of "The Suspex", who co-wrote the song along with Lovato, Sean Douglas, Nikki Williams, and Aaron Phillips. Nikki Williams said the song was written two years prior to its release. She explained: "At the time I was going through some relationship stuff, and I was just so depressed, so when I got into the session I thought, 'You know what? I'm gonna pour it all out there, and get it off my chest'". The song was first intended for Williams, but her record label rejected it. Pia Toscano then recorded the song in 2011 intending it for her debut album with Interscope Records, but it did not materialize. She would later state that some of her version would be kept as background vocals in the final version of the song. When Lovato heard the song, she recorded it before altering a few lyrics. In an interview with MTV, Evigan explained:

A lot of people wanted the song. And then Demi came in to do another song called 'Two Pieces' and then we played her 'Heart Attack' and she freaked out about it. So she came in to record it and then she actually had a couple of lyric changes that were really good. She added that super high note at the end and she added some really cool things to it and she brought that song to life. Now it's taking off.

According to him, the first version also contained a dubstep breakdown, which was removed for Lovato. He also stated, "Demi has magic to it where she has so much sass in her voice but yet so much power and all those really high notes at the end, she added that on the spot." Williams described the song, said: "It's about me being really scared to fall in love again after being rejected, after feeling so fragile and vulnerable all the time — thinking, I don't know if I can do this ever again!" Lovato told MTV that the song's lyrics address "falling in love and taking that risk. But, she's terrified and, by 'she,' I mean me. But, I think everyone comes to a point where they feel very vulnerable in falling in love and that's what I'm talking about."

A trailer of "Heart Attack" was released on February 12, 2013. The song was originally set to premiere on On Air with Ryan Seacrest, but leaked online on February 24, 2013, springing Hollywood Records' marketing department into early action. "I was having an Oscar party at my house when [the leak] went down, so I had to excuse myself and have a conference call," said Hollywood Records' head of global marketing Robbie Snow. One day after its leak online, Hollywood Records quickly released the song on iTunes Store, Spotify and other streaming services on February 25, 2013. She also released an official Vevo clip of the song the same day, and asked Seacrest to link his Twitter followers to the track. Additionally, a lyric video debuted on March 1, 2013. Lovato prompted fans to unlock the video by tweeting song lyrics and the hashtag #UnlockHeartAttack, which became a worldwide trending topic on Twitter.

== Composition ==
"Heart Attack" is an electropop song, with a length of three minutes and thirty seconds. The song is composed in the key of F minor and features a moderate tempo of 92 beats per minute. Lovato's vocal range spans from the low note of F_{3} to the high note of G_{5}. In the first verses, Lovato sings among a "booming" beat: "Never put my love out on the line/ Never said 'yes' to the right guy... When I don't care/ I can play 'em like a Ken doll/ Won't wash my hair/ Then make 'em bounce like a basketball." The song features a power pop chorus where Lovato sings accompanied by a guitar.

== Critical reception ==
"Heart Attack" received acclaim from music critics. Sam Lansky of Idolator described the song as "a monster electropop track with some impressive Kelly Clarkson-esque wailing, a little drum-and-bass-inspired instrumentation on the chorus and a catchy guitar loop." Ray Rahman of Entertainment Weekly wrote: "the song is a big one, with pounding beats, earnest wailing, and some interesting lyrical choices." Maggie Malach of AOL Music gave a positive review, stating "Demi's last album had a strong R&B influence, but this song indicates she is going for a dancier vibe!" Billboard wrote that Lovato's sequel to "Give Your Heart a Break" continues in the vein of her cardiologically-themed singles and "demonstrates her maturing vocal range." Robert Copsey from Digital Spy deemed the song a "rare case of textbook pop that leaves a lasting impression" and gave it four stars out of five. Adam R. Holtz of Plugged In (publication) complimented the lyrical content of the song and its "infectious lilt of Lovato's proven pop vocal chops slathered over an up-to-the-minute EDM sonic foundation." Reviewing the album Demi, Amy Sciarretto from Artistdirect wrote: "Heart Attack" is easily one of Lovato's best overall, mixing synthy tension and her better-than-most voice, at least when it comes to the teen pop genre. She is a decidedly more capable vocalist than so many of her peers, and she doesn't require the heavy effects, the processing or the studio tricks that they do." Billboard and American Songwriter ranked the song number eight and number three, respectively, on their lists of the 10 greatest Demi Lovato songs.

== Commercial performance ==
"Heart Attack" made its chart debut on the Mainstream Top 40 chart at number 35. Billboard predicted the song would debut on the Billboard Hot 100 the following week on March 4, 2013, with an expected sales figure of 200,000 in first-week digital downloads, surpassing Lovato's "Skyscraper" (2011). Having sold 215,000 digital copies in the first week, "Heart Attack" debuted at number 12 on the Hot 100 on the week ending on March 8, 2013, and at the time was the second highest debut sales week of any artist for 2013. Along with the lead single's Hot 100 position, it debuted at number four on the Digital Songs chart, number 70 on the Radio Songs chart, and just under the top twenty on the newly implemented Streaming Songs chart. On April 27, 2013, "Heart Attack" became Lovato's third top ten hit in the United States, reaching number 10. In April 2013, "Heart Attack" was certified gold by the RIAA with sales brimming 500,000 in the space of only four weeks and as of 2014 has sold over 2,000,000 copies in the United States. In the United Kingdom and Ireland, "Heart Attack" debuted at number three, becoming Lovato's highest-charting single at the time in both countries, until "Solo", which reached number one on both charts in 2018. It received a platinum certification in the UK for sales exceeding 600,000 units.

== Music videos ==
The lyric video was released on March 1, 2013. On the video, a series of hashtags were used by her fans on Twitter, with the lyrics of the song. Trevor Kelly, executive director of global digital marketing Disney Music Group, said: "We knew that we wanted to involve Demi's fans in the lyric video, both in terms of how it was discovered and how it looked creatively... That was challenging to execute because the volume of trends she had created over the past year, but we ended up with a clip that was very unique and compelling to watch".

Regarding the video, Lovato described it as "fashion based" and thought it was "incredible to incorporate that with the music video". A teaser of the video was released on April 6, 2013. The music video was filmed on March 14, 2013, in Los Angeles, California and released on Vevo on April 9, 2013, and garnered over 850 million views to date. It was directed by Chris Applebaum.

== Live performances ==
Lovato first performed the song in Orlando, Florida on March 2, 2013, as well as on several live shows including The Ellen DeGeneres Show, Good Morning America, Jimmy Kimmel Live!, Britain's Got Talent, Dancing with the Stars and at the 2013 MuchMusic Video Awards.

On December 31, 2013, Lovato performed it at ET Canada's New Year's Eve televised show. Lovato performed the song along with "Give Your Heart a Break" and "Neon Lights" at the 2nd Indonesian Choice Awards, on May 24, 2015. She also performed the song on The Late Late Show with James Corden, during the Carpool Karaoke segment, which appeared online on May 16, 2016.

Lovato performed the track during her headlining concert tours, The Neon Lights Tour, the Demi World Tour, the Future Now Tour, the Tell Me You Love Me World Tour, the Holy Fvck Tour, and the It's Not That Deep Tour.

== Awards and nominations ==
Year	Award	Category	Result
2013	MuchMusic Video Awards	International Video of the Year - Artist	Won
2013	MTV Video Music Awards	Best Female Video	Nominated
2013	People's Choice Awards	Favorite Music Video	Nominated
2013	Teen Choice Awards	Choice Single by a Female Artist	Won
2013	YouTube Music Awards	Video of the Year	Nominated

== Credits and personnel ==
Recording and management

- Mixed at MixStar Studios (Virginia Beach)
- Mastered at Sterling Sound Studios (New York City)
- Published by BMG Platinum Songs/Art In The Fodder Music/Part of the Problem Publishing (BMI), BMG Platinum Songs/Bad Robot Music (BMI), Philmore Music (ASCAP), Seven Peaks Music (ASCAP) and Demi Lovato Publishing (ASCAP)

Personnel

- Demi Lovato – vocals, songwriting
- Mitch Allan – songwriting, production
- Jason Evigan – songwriting, production
- Sean Douglas – songwriting
- Nikki Williams – songwriting
- Aaron Phillips – songwriting
- Serban Ghenea – mixing
- John Hanes – engineering
- Chris Gehringer – mastering

Credits adapted from the liner notes of Demi.

== Charts ==
=== Weekly charts ===
Weekly chart performance for "Heart Attack"
Chart (2013–2014)	Peak position
Australia (ARIA)	41
Belgium (Ultratop 50 Flanders)	27
Belgium (Ultratip Bubbling Under Wallonia)	13
Brazil (Billboard Brasil Hot 100)	45
Brazil Hot Pop Songs	17
Canada Hot 100 (Billboard)	7
Canada AC (Billboard)	35
Canada CHR/Top 40 (Billboard)	6
Canada Hot AC (Billboard)	8
CIS Airplay (TopHit)	147
Czech Republic Airplay (ČNS IFPI)	44
Denmark (Tracklisten)	25
Euro Digital Songs (Billboard)	8
France (SNEP)	69
Greece Digital Songs (Billboard)	17
Ireland (IRMA)	3
Italy (FIMI)	28
Lebanon (Lebanese Top 20)	4
Netherlands (Dutch Top 40)	31
Netherlands (Single Top 100)	36
New Zealand (Recorded Music NZ)	9
Norway (VG-lista)	15
Scottish Singles Sales (Official Charts)	3
Slovakia Airplay (ČNS IFPI)	40
South Korea International Chart (Gaon)	22
Spain (Promusicae)	34
Sweden (Sverigetopplistan)	52
Switzerland (Schweizer Hitparade)	73
UK Singles (Official Charts)	3
Ukraine Airplay (TopHit)	32
US Billboard Hot 100	10
US Adult Contemporary (Billboard)	28
US Adult Pop Airplay (Billboard)	12
US Dance Airplay (Billboard)	14
US Dance Club Songs (Billboard)	1
US Pop Airplay (Billboard)	4
Venezuela Pop Rock (Record Report)	1

=== Year-end charts ===
Year-end chart performance for "Heart Attack"
Chart (2013)	Position
Belgium (Ultratop 50 Flanders)	99
Brazil (Crowley)	69
Canada (Canadian Hot 100)	38
Netherlands (Dutch Top 40)	177
Ukraine Airplay (TopHit)	98
UK Singles (Official Charts Company)	73
US Billboard Hot 100	50
US Mainstream Top 40 (Billboard)	30
US Hot Dance Club Songs (Billboard)	39

== Certifications ==
Certifications and sales for "Heart Attack"
Region	Certification	Certified units/sales
Australia (ARIA)	3× Platinum	210,000^{‡}
Brazil (Pro-Música Brasil)	2× Diamond	500,000^{‡}
Canada (Music Canada)	2× Platinum	160,000^{*}
Germany (BVMI)	Gold	150,000^{‡}
Ireland (IRMA)	Gold	7,500^{^}
Italy (FIMI)	Gold	50,000^{‡}
Mexico (AMPROFON)	Gold	30,000^{*}
New Zealand (RMNZ)	2× Platinum	60,000^{‡}
Spain (Promusicae)	Gold	30,000^{‡}
Sweden (GLF)	Platinum	40,000^{‡}
United Kingdom (BPI)	Platinum	600,000^{‡}
United States (RIAA)	6× Platinum	6,000,000^{‡}
Streaming
Denmark (IFPI Danmark)	Platinum	1,800,000^{†}
^{*} Sales figures based on certification alone.^{^} Shipments figures based on certification alone.^{‡} Sales+streaming figures based on certification alone.^{†} Streaming-only figures based on certification alone.

== Release history ==
Release dates for "Heart Attack"
Country	Date	Format	Label
Australia	February 25, 2013	CD; digital download	Hollywood Records
India	February 25, 2013	CD; digital download	Hollywood Records
Canada	February 25, 2013	CD; digital download	Hollywood Records
Mexico	February 25, 2013	CD; digital download	Hollywood Records
New Zealand	February 25, 2013	CD; digital download	Hollywood Records
Brazil	February 25, 2013	CD; digital download	Hollywood Records
United States	February 25, 2013	CD; digital download	Hollywood Records
Hong Kong	February 26, 2013	CD; digital download	Hollywood Records
Malaysia	February 26, 2013	CD; digital download	Hollywood Records
Singapore	February 26, 2013	CD; digital download	Hollywood Records
Italy	March 4, 2013	CD; digital download	Universal Music Group
Austria	March 5, 2013	CD; digital download	Universal Music Group
Hungary	March 5, 2013	CD; digital download	Universal Music Group
Netherlands	March 5, 2013	CD; digital download	Universal Music Group
Poland	March 5, 2013	CD; digital download	Universal Music Group
United States	March 5, 2013	Contemporary hit radio	Hollywood Records
France	March 25, 2013	Digital download	Universal Music Group
Norway	April 1, 2013	Digital download	Universal Music Group
Italy	April 19, 2013	Contemporary hit radio	Universal Music Group
United Kingdom	May 12, 2013	Digital download	Universal Music Group

== "Heart Attack" (rock version) ==
"Heart Attack" (rock version)

Single by Demi Lovato

from the album Revamped
- Released: March 24, 2023
- Studio: SuCasa (Los Angeles, California)
- Genre: Hard rock; pop-punk; punk rock
- Length: 3:59
- Label: DLG Recordings, LLC; Island
- Songwriters: Mitch Allan; Jason Evigan; Sean Douglas; Nikki Williams; Aaron Philips; Demi Lovato
- Producers: Warren "Oak" Felder; Mitch Allan

Demi Lovato singles chronology
"Still Alive" (2023)	"Heart Attack" (rock version) (2023)	"Cool for the Summer" (rock version) (2023)

Lyric video
- "Heart Attack" (rock version) on YouTube

In January 2022, Lovato held a "funeral" for her pop music ahead of the release of her eighth studio album Holy Fvck in August of that year. The album, which embraced a heavier rock sound that departed from the pop sound of Lovato's previous releases, was supported by the Holy Fvck Tour. The setlist included several rock versions of her older pop songs, including "Heart Attack".

On March 20, 2023, Lovato announced via social media that she would release a studio recording of the rock version of "Heart Attack" to mark the song's 10th anniversary. It was released digitally on March 24, 2023.

=== Production ===
"Heart Attack (Rock Version)" was produced by Warren "Oak" Felder, a frequent collaborator of Lovato who produced the majority of Holy Fvck, and Mitch Allan, who co-produced the original version. Felder explained that he initially found it challenging to remake "Heart Attack" because he "loved" the original, saying that "you just can't get the original version outta your head". Lovato re-recorded her vocals; Felder stated that "Demi's voice now is a witness and testament to the things that she's been through as a person". He added that "there is a lot more experience and understanding of those emotions behind the way that she's singing it now" and that this, along with listening to Lovato's song "La La Land" from her debut album Don't Forget (2008), helped him create a new rock production for "Heart Attack".

Lovato described herself as "a completely different person" at the time she recorded the original; she said in a press release, "I'm so happy to be able to give a new life to 'Heart Attack' with a sound that reflects where I am with my music. This one is for the fans who have shown so much love to the song over the last decade, thank you for riding with me!" Critics considered the intro as being reminiscent of the original song but described the sound of the re-recording as heavier. According to Tomás Mier of Rolling Stone, "Heart Attack (Rock Version)" consists of "a heavy drum beat and electric guitar", while Adrianne Reece of Elite Daily noted "punk-styled drums and a gritty baseline". Both Mier and Reece called Lovato's re-recorded vocals "mature" and praised her high notes.

=== Charts ===
Chart performance for "Heart Attack" (Rock Version)
Chart (2023)	Peak position
Canada Digital Songs (Billboard)	48
New Zealand Hot Singles (RMNZ)	18
UK Singles Downloads (OCC)	33
UK Singles Sales (OCC)	34
US Digital Song Sales (Billboard)	28
US Hot Rock & Alternative Songs (Billboard)	39

== See also ==
- List of Billboard Hot 100 top 10 singles in 2013
- List of number-one dance singles of 2013 (U.S.)
- List of UK top 10 singles in 2013
