= Eat Me (song) =

2022 song by Demi Lovato

- Vevo "Official Live Performance" cover

Song by Demi Lovato featuring Royal & the Serpent

from the album Holy Fvck
- Released: August 19, 2022
- Studio: SuCasa (Los Angeles, CA)
- Genre: Rock
- Length: 3:00
- Label: Island
- Songwriters: Demi Lovato; Ryan Santiago; Keith "Ten4" Sorrells; Laura Veltz; Warren "Oak" Felder; Alex Niceforo
- Producers: Oak; Alex Niceforo; Keith "Ten4" Sorrells

Visualizer
- "Eat Me" on YouTube

"Eat Me" is a song by the American singer Demi Lovato featuring the American singer Royal & the Serpent, taken from the former's eighth studio album, Holy Fvck (2022). Both artists wrote the song along with Laura Veltz, Keith "Ten4" Sorrells, Warren "Oak" Felder, and Alex Niceforo, while production was handled by the latter three. Containing electric guitar riffs, "Eat Me" emphasizes on Lovato's feminine image and how she sees contradictions in the American media and music industry.

Upon the album's release, "Eat Me" received positive reviews from music critics, being described as anthemic and combative. A live performance music video of the track was published by Vevo on September 1, 2022. The song was included on the regular set list of Lovato's seventh concert tour, the Holy Fvck Tour, which passed through North and South America in 2022.

== Background and release ==
After ensuring a "funeral" for her former pop music on social media, Demi Lovato announced her eighth studio album, Holy Fvck, on June 6, 2022, along with its cover art, release date, and with a link to her official store where fans could order physical copies of the record, but did not immediately reveal the tracklist. On July 14, she confirmed the track listing of the album, in which "Eat Me", featuring American singer-songwriter Royal & the Serpent, appears as the fourth song.

"Eat Me" became available for digital download on Holy Fvck on August 19, 2022, when it was released by Island Records. The song was included on the set list of Lovato's seventh concert tour, the Holy Fvck Tour (2022). From September 28 to October 19, Royal & the Serpent joined Lovato to perform "Eat Me", and again on November 9 and 10. The official Vevo Live performance of the song directed by Micah Bickham was released on September 1, 2022. It followed a performance video for "29", released one week earlier. In a statement, Lovato said: "I knew I wanted to showcase my new music in a unique way for my fans, both visually and sonically [...] I hope my fans can feel the emotion and power through these live performances".

== Composition and lyrics ==
"Eat Me" is three minutes long. It was written by Lovato, Royal & the Serpent, Laura Veltz, Keith "Ten4" Sorrells, Warren "Oak" Felder, and Alex Niceforo, and produced by the latter three. On "Eat Me", Felder is also credited for background vocals, programming, recording, and keyboards. The track was mixed by Neal Avron and mastered by Chris Gehringer.

On "Eat Me", Lovato reflects on her past public image. She sings "Would you like me better if I was still her?/Did she make your mouths water?", lines that the magazine Spin interpreted as "a direct callout to the hyperfeminine popstar she felt she had to be", referring to the moment when Lovato came out as non-binary in 2021, adopting they/them as primary pronouns. In the following year, she accepted feminine pronouns as well. Following a controversy, the singer stated: "I've made a few headlines by saying I'm accepting of the pronouns she/her. It's not that I'm changing anything about myself. I'm just accepting my femininity back. I felt like I had to reject it for a minute because that's how I was feeling at the time, and because I wanted to escape that feminine popstar role that I was playing. I had to get away from that".

The track also points out the "contradictions" of American media. Containing "punchy" electric guitar riffs, "industrial grind, tempo shifts and raging yelps", it was described by The Guardian's Sophie Harris as a dark moment on the album. It is presented on an "overwhelming" rock musical base. Billboard also related "Eat Me" to the singer's coming out, describing it as an act of rebellion. According to The Independent, on the lyrics of the song, Lovato "swivels the target from herself to the industry that shackled her to their lucrative expectations".

== Critical reception ==
Upon release, the song received positive reviews from music critics. Stephen Daw for Billboard ranked "Eat Me" as the second best song on the album, while writing that the song "is Holy Fvck's most potent middle finger directed at anyone detracting from Demi's journey to self-discovery", and describing it as a "seething anthem to resistance". Jenesaispop declared that the track "would deserve equal acceptance" as "29", which went viral and charted on the US Billboard Hot 100. The Spanish newspaper dubbed it as the hardest song on the album. Melissa Ruggieri, writing for USA Today, compared "Eat Me" to the music of the American industrial rock band Nine Inch Nails, and said that the track sees Lovato and Royal & the Serpent "tiptoe in on a creeping goth vibe before the song explodes into a fireball of anger". While reviewing Holy Fvck, Emily Swingle of Clash described "Eat Me" as "delicious", and a song that "overflows with attitude".

== Personnel ==
Obtained from Lovato's official website.

- Demi Lovato – vocals
- Royal & the Serpent – vocals
- Warren "Oak" Felder – background vocals, programming, keyboards, executive production, production, recording
- Keith "Ten4" Sorrells – background vocals, programming, guitar, bass, drums, co-production
- Laura Veltz – background vocals
- Neal Avron – mixing
- Scooter Braun – executive production
- Chris Gehringer – mastering
- Oscar Linnander – production assistance, recording
- Alex Niceforo – co-production
