= Cool for the Summer =

2015 single by Demi Lovato

Single by Demi Lovato

from the album Confident
- Released: July 1, 2015
- Studio: MXM Studios (Los Angeles); Wolf Cousins Studios (Stockholm)
- Genre: Electropop; pop rock
- Length: 3:34
- Label: Hollywood; Island; Republic; Safehouse
- Songwriters: Demi Lovato; Savan Kotecha; Max Martin; Alexander Erik Kronlund; Ali Payami
- Producers: Max Martin; Ali Payami

Demi Lovato singles chronology
"Up" (2014)	"Cool for the Summer" (2015)	"Confident" (2015)

Music video
- "Cool for the Summer" on YouTube

"Cool for the Summer" is a song by American singer Demi Lovato. It was released as the lead single from her fifth studio album Confident (2015) on July 1, 2015, by Hollywood Records and Island Records, and premiered on radio on the same date via Republic Records. Lovato co-wrote "Cool for the Summer" with Alexander Erik Kronlund, Savan Kotecha, and its producers Max Martin and Ali Payami. It is an electropop and pop rock song with an electronic instrumental arrangement, a synthesized beat and an electric-guitar riff during the chorus.

"Cool for the Summer" was included in several year-end lists and received nominations for MTV Video Music Awards and 2015 Teen Choice Awards in the category Song of the Summer. It also received an award for being one of the most-performed songs of 2015 at the ASCAP Pop Music Awards. Commercially, "Cool for the Summer" reached number-one in Greece and Israel and reached the top ten in the Czech Republic, Lebanon, New Zealand, Scotland, and the United Kingdom. The song also peaked within the top 20 in Australia, Canada, Ireland, Slovakia, and the United States.

A music video for the song was directed by Hannah Lux Davis and was released on Vevo on July 23, 2015. The video was positively received; publications praised Lovato's sultriness and artistic growth. To promote the song, Lovato performed it at pool parties a few days after its release, and on several television programs such as The Voice Australia, Sunrise, the 2015 MTV Video Music Awards and Jimmy Kimmel Live. The singer also performed the song in a medley with "Confident" on Saturday Night Live during the show's forty-first season. Wearing a T-shirt featuring an inclusive bathroom symbol, Lovato showed her support for the LGBTQ community and demonstrated against North Carolina's anti-LGBT bathroom bill during her performance of "Cool for the Summer" at the 2016 Billboard Music Awards on May 22, 2016. She also included the song on the set lists for the Future Now Tour (2016), Tell Me You Love Me World Tour (2018), and Holy Fvck Tour (2022).

Due to a resurgence of the song on TikTok in March 2022, the song re-peaked in several countries worldwide, reaching number-one on the global Shazam chart and debuting on the Billboard Global 200 chart. In response to the song going viral, Lovato released a sped-up version of the song on April 1, 2022. A re-recorded rock version of the song was released on May 25, 2023, and was included on her first remix album Revamped (2023).

== Composition and release ==
Demi Lovato co-wrote "Cool for the Summer" with Alexander Erik Kronlund, Savan Kotecha, and its producers Ali Payami and Max Martin—who also handled programming. It was recorded at MXM Studios in Los Angeles (USA) and Wolf Cousins Studios in Stockholm, Sweden. The song was mixed by Serban Ghenea and mastered by Tom Coyne. Payami played the guitars, percussion, and keyboards. Lovato said the track is "an awesome representation of where I'm headed", and "I think for so many years, I cared too much about what people thought. Now I can just be who I am. I can be open." She told Elvis Duran in a radio interview: "After kind of being put in a corner of talking about so many things in my past, I just want to talk about sexy time and fun things!" On June 25, 2015, Lovato announced that "Cool for the Summer" would be released on July 1 that year. The song was leaked the day before its official release.

"Cool for the Summer" runs for 3 minutes and 34 seconds. It is an electropop and pop rock song with a rock edge and an electronic pop rock arrangement running through a synthesized beat with electric guitar riffs. NME editor Nick Levine praised the song's style, describing it as a "massive EDM-tinged-tinged pop banger with lyrics hinting at an exploratory same-sex tryst". According to Lovato, "'Cool for the Summer' is basically your go-to party anthem song. It's definitely more grown up than my other singles I've released. It's sexy, it's fun." She later said she could "kind of bring attention to people's sexuality, taking away the stigma and the shame of wanting to try things", and called the track a "sexy pop song" that could "inspire people to be themselves". Lovato added, "I know it was an awesome journey for me to be able to put that out in front of the world and not feel ashamed about it."

The song's theme is sexual experimentation with a female lover during summertime; it was noted for being more sexually suggestive than Lovato's previous releases, garnering comparisons with Katy Perry's song "I Kissed a Girl". Tharadjyne Orisma of United Press International wrote that the song "makes some pretty racy suggestions". The track's ambient production consists of a melodic piano introduction, which is followed by a buzzing synth beat accompanied by guitar riffs in the chorus. According to the sheet music published by Kobalt Music Publishing America, Inc on the website Musicnotes.com, "Cool for the Summer" is in the key of C minor and is set in a 4/4 time signature at a moderate tempo of 114 beats per minute. On the recording, Lovato's vocal range spans from the low note of B♭_{3} to the high note of F_{5}, while the music follows the chord progression of A♭maj_{7} – Fm – Cm – E♭/B♭.

== Critical reception ==
Following its release, Lovato was accused of copying Jessie J's song "Domino" and Katy Perry's song "I Kissed a Girl"; the lyrics "It's okay/I'm a little curious too/Tell me if it's wrong/If it's right/I don't care ... Got a taste for the cherry/I just need to take a bite" were compared to the theme of Perry's "I Kissed a Girl", which was also co-written by Max Martin. In response, Lovato stated the songs sounded unalike, saying, "I think more than one female artist can kiss a girl and like it". Yasmeen Gharnit of Nylon magazine called the song "a blatantly summer song" that has "boisterous, cinematic instrumentals and synth beat" that distract from "some straight-out-of-your-middle-school-diary lyrics". Jason Lipshutz of Billboard gave the song a rating of four-and-a-half stars out of five, calling it Lovato's "most self-assured statement to date". Idolator gave it an average rating of 7.5 out of 10, writing, "from the hook-filled production to the tongue-in-cheek lyrics, it only takes one listen to know that 'Cool for the Summer' is going to be huge".

Nolan Feeney of Time stated that "Lovato's sultry vocals and producer Max Martin's Midas touch melt the track's air-conditioned synths into a sweltering, rock-infused banger". Writing for New York, Dee Lockett called it "the most perfectly manufactured Song of Summer maybe ever". Annie Zaleskie from the website The A.V. Club called the song an "unstoppable hit" and described it as "an icy rush of electro-pop seduction in praise of fleeting romance". In a review of the song's parent album Confident, Yu Tsai of USA Today praised the lyrics, writing; "Lovato has long-infused her brand of pop with rock 'n' roll grit, heard here and on the electric-guitar riffs of first single 'Cool For The Summer'. While its limp attempts at being provocative emit little heat ... [the track] is still one of the catchier songs on the album, whose other potential radio hits are harder to identify." Newsday's Glen Gambo gave a positive review to the song's production; he is one of several critics who compared the song to Perry's work produced by Max Martin. Unlike other critics, Gambo noted the similarity to another song recorded by Perry, writing that on "Cool for the Summer", Martin builds a "sleek, shiny backdrop" similar to that of Perry's "Teenage Dream" (2010) for Lovato, who uses it to "advocate for sexual experimentation in the name of a good time".

=== Recognition ===
"Cool for the Summer" was included on several year-end lists. Spin ranked the song at number 101; the magazine's editor Jia Tolentino wrote; "From that first icy, neon piano riff, 'Cool For the Summer' feels like a Miami drag race in an '80s dream, with a muscular force in Demi's chorus that makes those sweet, girlish verses seem like a lie you'd tell your parents just before you'd sneak out of the house". In Village Voice's 2015 "Pazz & Jop" mass critics' poll of the year's best music, "Cool for the Summer" was tied at number 29 with three other songs. Stereogum's Chris DeVille considered it the 23rd-best song of the year, writing that "the parade of undeniable hooks on 'Cool For The Summer' got Lovato's next chapter off on the right foot". Lewis Corner of Digital Spy also included the song on his end-of-year list, placing it at number 16. He also commented on the song's impact in Lovato career, describing it as "a breezy, dusky pop serenade, that ramps up with husky guitars before it ends. It's a surprising switch-up, but one that has every potential to see Demi's global profile shine even more." "Cool for the Summer" has received two award nominations; in August 2015, it was nominated for Choice Summer Song at the Teen Choice Awards, and for Song of Summer at the MTV Video Music Awards. On April 27, 2016, the song received an award at the ASCAP Pop Music Awards for being one of the most-performed songs of 2015. Billboard and American Songwriter both named "Cool for the Summer" as Lovato's second-greatest song.

In 2018, NPR ranked the track as the 198th greatest song performed by women and non-binary artists in the 21st century. In 2022, Bowen Yang and Matt Rogers of Las Culturistas ranked the song number 1 in their 300 Songs of the Great Global Songbook.

== Chart performance ==
=== North America ===
In the United States, "Cool for the Summer" debuted at number 36 on the Billboard Hot 100 dated July 18, 2015, with opening sales of 80,000 copies. In its second week on the chart, the song rose to number 28, becoming Lovato's first top-thirty hit since "Really Don't Care" (2014). In the same week, the song was also ranked at number 15 on Digital Songs with sales of 108,000; and at number 40 on Radio Songs, prompted by a 29-percent increase in the radio audience that week to 36 million. The release of its lyric video on July 7, 2015, also prompted a gain of 185 percent in US streams to 2.4 million, the second-largest advance on the chart that week behind Fetty Wap's song "679". On the August 1, 2015, chart, the song slipped from its number 28 high to number 31 on the Hot 100 but continued to gain radio audience and streams. It climbed from number 40 to number 25 on Radio Songs—45 million, up 25 percent—and debuted on Streaming Songs at number 41 with 3.3 million US streams, up 41 percent. After the released of the music video on July 23, 2015, "Cool For the Summer" rose from number 31 to number 24 on August 8, 2015, becoming Lovato's highest charting position since "Heart Attack" (2013).

The song climbed from 24 to number 19 on the Hot 100 chart issued on August 15, 2015, and from number 18 to number 12 on the Digital Songs chart with sales of 63,000 downloads (up 17 percent) in the week ending July 30, according to Nielsen SoundScan. It climbed from number 31 to number 18 on Streaming Songs—6.6 million US streams, up 49 percent—and rose from number 22 to number 18 on Radio Songs with 56 million audience impressions, a rise of nine percent. "Cool for the Summer" later peaked at number 11 on the Hot 100.

On the Dance Club Songs chart, "Cool for the Summer" reached number one in its fifth week; its climb from number five to number one was the quickest on that chart since Lady Gaga's song "Applause", which in October 2013 also reached number one in five weeks. On September 23, 2016, "Cool for the Summer" was certified Double Platinum by the Recording Industry Association of America (RIAA), denoting sales and streams of two million copies in the US. On the Canadian Hot 100, the single entered the chart at number 50, peaked at number 14, and was certified platinum by Music Canada for Canadian sales of 80,000 copies. As of October 2017, "Cool for the Summer" has sold over 995,000 digital downloads in the United States.

=== Europe and Australia ===
In the United Kingdom, "Cool for the Summer" debuted and peaked at number seven on the UK Singles Chart, equalling Lovato's song "Skyscraper" to become her third-highest entry in the UK. "Cool for the Summer" was certified silver by the British Phonographic Industry (BPI) on November 13, 2015, for sales of 200,000 copies in the UK. In Scotland, it peaked at number three.

The song peaked at number 52 in Italy and received a gold certification for 25,000 copies sold in the country. "Cool for the Summer" reached number one in Greece. "Cool for the Summer" also reached the top twenty in several other European countries, including Ireland where it reached number 18. In Spain the song reached number 66 and spent 6 weeks on the chart. The song debuted at number 99 in Sweden on August 7, 2015, and reached number 63, selling 20,000 copies and being certified gold.

On the New Zealand Singles Chart, "Cool for the Summer" debuted at number 37 on July 27, 2015; it peaked at number nine, becoming Lovato's fourth top-ten single in New Zealand, and spent 14 weeks on the chart. It was certified gold by Recorded Music NZ (RMNZ) in 2015 for selling 15,000 digital copies. On the ARIA Singles Chart in Australia, the song debuted at number 56 and peaked at number 20, receiving a platinum certification by the Australian Recording Industry Association (ARIA) in 2016 for sales of 70,000 copies.

== Music videos ==
=== Official video ===
A screenshot from the music video, showing Lovato wearing black latex and boots. In a scenery which Joe Lynch from Billboard described as a "neon-drenched ode to summer fun—with an emphasis on what happens after dark".

The music video for "Cool for the Summer" was directed by Hannah Lux Davis and released on Vevo on July 23, 2015. The video begins with Lovato driving around a city with her friends. The scene is intercut with a scene in which Lovato, wearing black latex, sings and whips her hair around in an isolated location. The video continues with Lovato and her friends arriving at a party; it cuts between a number of scenes showing people on a trampoline and Lovato dancing and having fun at the party. Rob Copsey from Official Charts described the video as "hot" and wrote that it "sees her hit the road with her gal pals (and a bottle of her own-brand hydrating mist) before getting it on with each other at a wild house party".

Christina Garibaldi of MTV News deemed the video "seductive, sassy and smokin' hot", and noted it marked "a new chapter of her career, as she exudes a confidence and sexiness that we haven't seen before". Bianca Gracie of Idolator and Lewis Corner of Digital Spy both thought the video is Lovato's "steamiest". Hayden Manders of Nylon wrote that the video "doesn't disappoint, but it somewhat misses the mark", and "it's odd that a video for a song about same-sex experimentation features none. You'd have to listen to the lyrics to understand the underlying message of the song because the video shies away from it." New York magazine's Dee Lockett called it "the most sexually liberated video Demi's ever done to go along with its empowering message". The video surpassed 355 million views in June 2020, making it Lovato's ninth Vevo-certified clip.

=== Lyric video ===
A lyric video for the song was released on July 7, 2015, on Vevo; it features Lovato singing at the pool parties.

== Live performances ==
Lovato first performed "Cool for the Summer" live at Z100's CFTS Release Pool Party in New York City on the day of its release. She subsequently performed the song at other pool parties, including one hosted by 102.7 KIIS-FM at the WaterMarke Tower in Los Angeles, where she fell while trying to jump into the pool. Lovato also performed the song at the Major League Baseball All-Star Game in Cincinnati on July 11, replacing Ariana Grande. She performed "Cool for the Summer" with an all-female band on The Voice Australia on August 9, 2015. Taylor Whatherby of Billboard magazine wrote, "Lovato nailed her vocals as the rest of the girls jammed on electric guitars, a keyboard, and drums". The following day, she performed the song on the Australian television program Sunrise. On August 30, 2015, Lovato performed the song with rapper Iggy Azalea at the 2015 MTV Video Music Awards. Lovato, who was wearing a purple leotard, began the performance in a beach chair with male dancers around her. During the song's second chorus, a cherry-shaped piñata was introduced onstage. Billboard ranked the performance as the fourth best of the night. The next day, Lovato sang the song on Jimmy Kimmel Live.

As one of the headliners of the 2015 NRJ Music Tour, Lovato performed the track in Saint-Quentin, France, on September 5, 2015. On September 9, 2015, Lovato delivered a more intimate version of the song at BBC Radio 1's Live Lounge in London. On September 11, 2015, she was a guest performer on British comedy chat show Alan Carr: Chatty Man. The song was also a part of Lovato's set list for the 2015 iHeartRadio Music Festival on September 18–19, 2015.

Lovato performed a medley consisting of "Cool for the Summer" and "Confident" on Saturday Night Live on October 17, 2015. Billboard editor Ashley Iasimone commented that "the mix was a fiery performance that showed off the singer's attitude and self-assurance". The song was included on Lovato's set list for CBS Radio's "We Can Survive" event, which was held on October 24, 2015. The song was on Lovato's set list at the 2015 106.1 KISS FM Fall Ball on November 14, 2015, as well as the set list for the 2015 Jingle Ball Tour. On December 31, 2015, as a headliner of Dick Clark's New Year's Rockin' Eve, she performed another medley of "Cool for the Summer" and "Confident" in Times Square, New York.

Lovato performed "Cool for the Summer" on the second edition of the Victoria's Secret Swim Special, which aired on March 9, 2016. On May 14, 2016, she performed "Cool for the Summer" as part of her set at the 2016 edition of Wango Tango. Lovato gave a more soulful rendition of "Cool for the Summer" at the 2016 Billboard Music Awards on May 22, 2016. During the performance, she expressed support for the LGBT community and protested against North Carolina's anti-LGBT "bathroom bill" by wearing a T-shirt displaying an inclusive bathroom symbol. The song was performed as an encore on the Future Now Tour. Lovato performed the track during her Tell Me You Love Me World Tour.

== Covers and use in media ==
"Cool for the Summer" was one of the official theme songs of WWE SummerSlam 2015. During a show at the Staples Center in Los Angeles on August 20, 2015, singer Kelly Clarkson performed a downtempo version of the song, which was backed by an acoustic guitar and piano. Singer Blake McIver also covered the song, saying, "I decided to put my own spin on it. I'm a mid-century nut so I gave it a lil' throwback, late 50s, early 60s vibe." It was also covered by the post-punk band Dead Tooth in 2023. The song is featured in the dance video game Just Dance 2016. "Cool for the Summer" was featured during a lip sync battle in the ninth season of RuPaul's Drag Race, with Kesha as the special guest judge. LXMINAL has produced several hardstyle remixes, including one with Enmity which is used in the background of several TikTok videos.

== Remixes ==
Safehouse Records released several remixes of the song; the first remixes were done by Todd Terry, VARA, Dave Audé, Cahill, Plastic Plates, and Mike Cruz. These were released on a CD single and digital download titled Cool for the Summer– The Remixes on August 7, 2015. Lindsay Harvey of Billboard wrote that the remix by Plastic Plates "slows things down a bit" and features a "steadily paced bass line" with "lighter rhythms". American DJ Todd Terry told Billboard:

I really liked the freedom I got from Demi and her team. She told me to go make a version that I would play out in one of my sets versus focusing on a radio-friendly mix. That was refreshing and I think that being able to fully approach it with doing what was best for the track for club play really made this remix rock.

"Cool for the Summer" also was remixed by electronic dance music DJ duo Jump Smokers and Suraci; Billboard's Harvey described the first version as a "high-energy remix" and praised it, calling it relentless "from beginning to end, save for a momentary breath of air in the middle that exists merely as a much needed break". Both remixes were included in the deluxe edition of Confident. Following the resurgence of the song in March 2022, Lovato announced another remix of the song titled "Sped Up" by Speed Radio, which was released on April 1, 2022.

== Track listing ==
- CD single 1
1. "Cool for the Summer" – 3:34
2. "Cool for the Summer" (DJ Laszlo Remix) – 6:11
3. "Cool for the Summer" (Todd Terry Remix) – 4:47
4. "Cool for the Summer" (Dave Aude Remix) – 6:32
- CD single 2
1. "Cool for the Summer" – 3:34
2. "Cool for the Summer" (Liam Keegan Remix) – 5:10
3. "Cool for the Summer" (Cahill Remix) – 6:17
4. "Cool for the Summer" (Mike Cruz Remix) – 7:23
- Digital download
1. "Cool for the Summer" – 3:34
- Digital download (The Remixes)
1. "Cool for the Summer" (Todd Terry Remix) – 4:47
2. "Cool for the Summer" (VARA Remix) – 4:25
3. "Cool for the Summer" (Dave Audé Remix) – 6:32
4. "Cool for the Summer" (Cahill Remix) – 6:17
5. "Cool for the Summer" (Plastic Plates Remix) – 4:36
6. "Cool for the Summer" (Mike Cruz Remix) – 7:23
- Digital download
1. "Cool for the Summer" (Sped Up Remix) – 3:12

== Credits and personnel ==
Credits adapted from the liner notes of Confident.

Recording

- Recorded at MXM Studios, Los Angeles, USA and Wolf Cousins Studios, Stockholm, Sweden
- Mixed at MixStar Studios, Virginia Beach, USA
- Mastered at Sterling Sound, New York City, USA

Management

- Published by MXM (ASCAP)
- All rights administered by Kobalt Songs Music Publishing (ASCAP), Wolf Cousins (STIM), Warner/Chappell Music SCAND (STIM) and Ddlovato Music (ASCAP)

Personnel

- Demi Lovato – lead vocals, songwriter
- Savan Kotecha – songwriter, background vocals
- Max Martin – songwriter, producer, additional programming
- Alexander Kronlund – songwriter
- Ali Payami – songwriter, producer, guitars, drums, percussion, programming
- Sam Holland – engineering
- Serban Ghenea – mixing
- Tom Coyne – mastering

== Charts ==
=== Weekly charts ===
Chart (2015)	Peak position
Australia (ARIA)	20
Belgium (Ultratip Bubbling Under Flanders)	7
Belgium (Ultratip Bubbling Under Wallonia)	11
Brazil (Hot 100 Airplay)	91
Canada Hot 100 (Billboard)	14
Canada AC (Billboard)	36
Canada CHR/Top 40 (Billboard)	9
Canada Hot AC (Billboard)	15
CIS Airplay (TopHit)	127
Czech Republic Airplay (ČNS IFPI)	32
Czech Republic Singles Digital (ČNS IFPI)	10
Finland Download (Latauslista)	17
Euro Digital Songs (Billboard)	12
France (SNEP)	64
Greece (Billboard)	1
Hungary (Single Top 40)	35
Hungary (Stream Top 40)	24
Ireland (IRMA)	18
Israel (Media Forest TV Airplay)	1
Italy (FIMI)	52
Lebanon (Lebanese Top 20)	10
Mexico Airplay (Billboard)	10
Netherlands (Single Top 100)	77
New Zealand (Recorded Music NZ)	9
Norway (VG-lista)	31
Scottish Singles Sales (Official Charts)	3
Slovakia Airplay (ČNS IFPI)	42
Slovakia Singles Digital (ČNS IFPI)	16
Spain (Promusicae)	66
Sweden (Sverigetopplistan)	63
Switzerland (Schweizer Hitparade)	64
UK Singles (Official Charts)	7
US Billboard Hot 100	11
US Adult Contemporary (Billboard)	26
US Adult Pop Airplay (Billboard)	10
US Dance Airplay (Billboard)	10
US Dance Club Songs (Billboard)	1
US Pop Airplay (Billboard)	3
US Rhythmic Airplay (Billboard)	31

Chart (2022)	Peak position
Austria (Ö3 Austria Top 40)	26
Germany (GfK)	33
Global 200 (Billboard)	58
Lithuania (AGATA)	23
Poland Airplay (ZPAV)	33
Portugal (AFP)	94
Slovakia (Singles Digitál Top 100)	22
Switzerland (Schweizer Hitparade)	53
Vietnam (Vietnam Hot 100)	35

=== Year-end charts ===
Chart (2015)	Position
Canada (Canadian Hot 100)	54
US Billboard Hot 100	53
US Adult Top 40 (Billboard)	39
US Dance Club Songs (Billboard)	34
US Mainstream Top 40 (Billboard)	25

Chart (2016)	Position
Brazil (Brasil Hot 100)	82

== Certifications ==
Region	Certification	Certified units/sales
Australia (ARIA)	3× Platinum	210,000^{‡}
Brazil (Pro-Música Brasil)	2× Diamond	500,000^{‡}
Canada (Music Canada)	3× Platinum	240,000^{‡}
Denmark (IFPI Danmark)	Gold	45,000^{‡}
Germany (BVMI)	Gold	200,000^{‡}
Italy (FIMI)	Gold	25,000^{‡}
New Zealand (RMNZ)	2× Platinum	60,000^{‡}
Norway (IFPI Norway)	Platinum	60,000^{‡}
Poland (ZPAV)	Platinum	50,000^{‡}
Portugal (AFP)	Gold	10,000^{‡}
Spain (Promusicae)	Gold	30,000^{‡}
Sweden (GLF)	Gold	20,000^{‡}
United Kingdom (BPI)	Platinum	600,000^{‡}
United States (RIAA)	5× Platinum	5,000,000^{‡}
^{‡} Sales+streaming figures based on certification alone.

== Release history ==
Region	Date	Format	Label	Ref.
Worldwide	July 1, 2015	Digital download	Hollywood; Island; Safehouse	
United States	July 7, 2015	Contemporary hit radio	Island; Hollywood; Republic; Safehouse	
Italy	July 10, 2015	Contemporary hit radio	Hollywood	
United States	July 13, 2015	Hot AC radio	Island; Hollywood; Republic; Safehouse	
Belgium	July 31, 2015	Digital download	Hollywood; Island; Safehouse	
United Kingdom	August 21, 2015	Digital download	Hollywood; Island; Safehouse	

== "Cool for the Summer" (rock version) ==
"Cool for the Summer" (rock version)

Single by Demi Lovato

from the album Revamped
- Released: May 25, 2023
- Studio: SuCasa (Los Angeles, California)
- Genre: Rock; metalcore
- Label: DLG Recordings, LLC; Island
- Songwriters: Demi Lovato; Savan Kotecha; Max Martin; Alexander Erik Kronlund; Ali Payami
- Producers: Warren "Oak" Felder; Keith "Ten4" Sorrelles; Alex Nice

Demi Lovato singles chronology
"Heart Attack" (rock version) (2023)	"Cool for the Summer" (rock version) (2023)	"Swine" (2023)

Lyric video
- "Cool for the Summer" (rock version) on YouTube

In January 2022, Lovato held a "funeral" for her pop music ahead of the release of her eighth studio album Holy Fvck in August of that year. The album, which embraced a heavier rock sound that departed from the pop sound of Lovato's previous releases, was supported by the Holy Fvck Tour. The setlist included several rock versions of her older pop songs, including "Cool for the Summer".

On March 24, 2023, Lovato released a rock version of her pop song "Heart Attack" to mark the song's 10th anniversary. On May 18, she announced via social media that she would release a rock version of "Cool for the Summer". It was released on May 25, 2023.

=== Production ===
Lovato initially teased a rock version of "Cool for the Summer" in an August 2022 video for Elle, saying that "if I had to re-record one of my songs for this album [Holy Fvck], it'd be 'Cool for the Summer'".

"Cool for the Summer (Rock Version)" was produced by Warren "Oak" Felder, Keith "Ten4" Sorrells, and Alex Nice, all of whom contributed to Holy Fvck. Hannah Dalley of Billboard described the snippet shared by Lovato to announce the rock version's release as consisting of "pounding drums and razor-edged electric guitar". Upon the full song's release, Starr Bowenbank wrote for the same publication that the rock version "swaps the original's poppy synths and uptempo instrumentation for a darker sound backed by electric guitars and grittier lyric delivery from Lovato". "Cool for the Summer (Rock Version)" contains a lyric change: the line "don't tell your mother" in the pre-chorus was replaced by "go tell your mother".

=== Certification ===
Region	Certification	Certified units/sales
Brazil (Pro-Música Brasil)	Gold	20,000^{‡}
^{‡} Sales+streaming figures based on certification alone.

== See also ==
- List of number-one dance singles of 2015 (U.S.)
- Billboard Year-End Hot 100 singles of 2015
