= Dead Tooth (band) =

American post-punk band

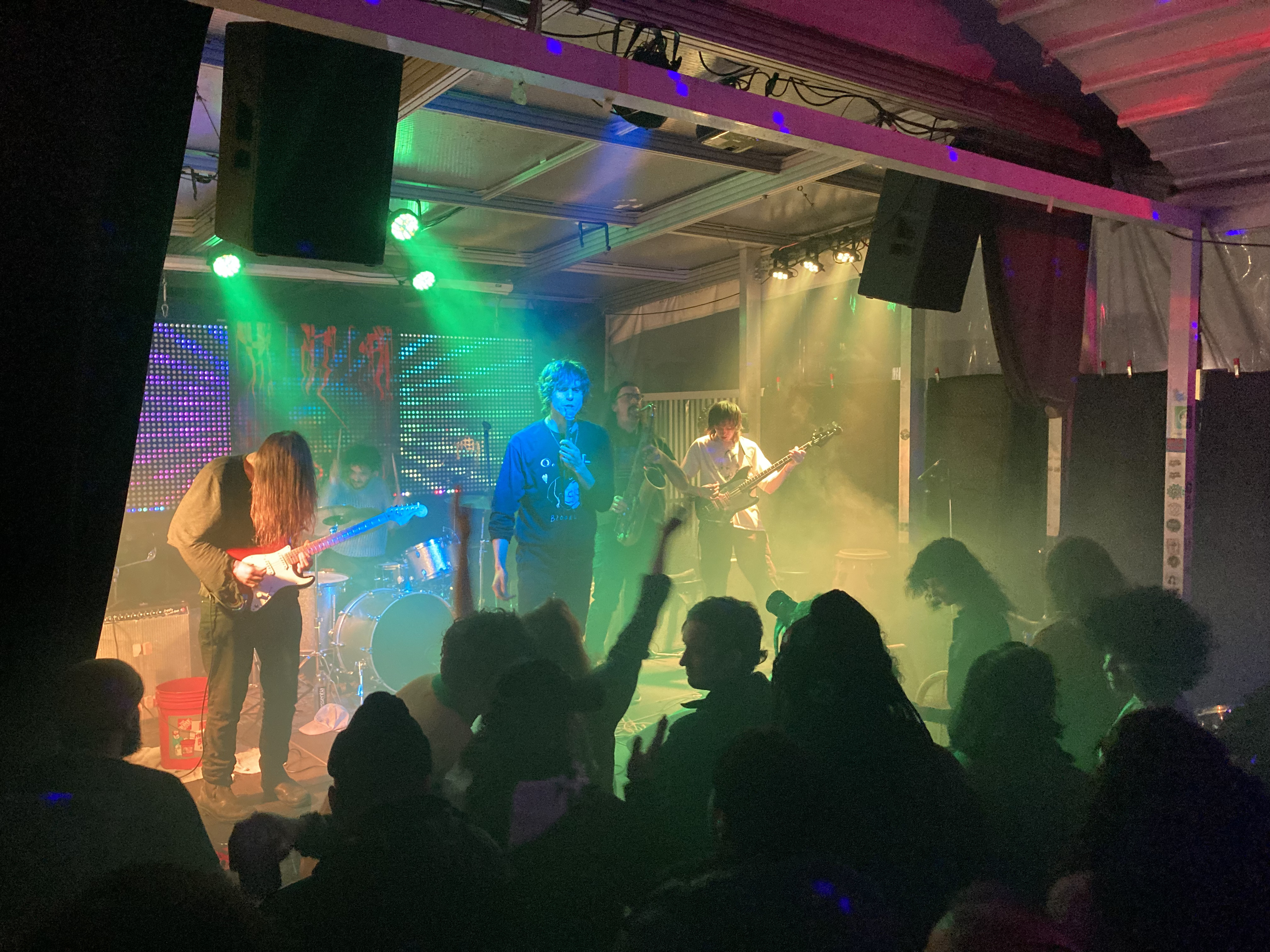
- Dead Tooth performing in Brooklyn on February 2, 2025. Left to right: Taylor Mitchell, Michael Cohen, Zach James Ellis, John Stanesco, and James Duncan.

Background information
- Origin: Queens, New York
- Genres: Post-punk
- Years active: 2018–present
- Labels: Five Kill Records; Trash Casual Records; Greenway Records
- Members: Zach James Ellis; John Stanesco; Taylor Mitchell; James Duncan; Michael Cohen
- Past members: Andrew Bailey; Dylan DePice; Jason Smith; River Allen; Ethan Glenn; Mark Brickman; Ginno Tacsiat; Max Idas

Dead Tooth is an American post-punk rodeo core band based out of Queens, New York.

== History ==
The origins of Dead Tooth began in 2015 when frontman Zach James Ellis met guitarist Andrew Bailey of DIIV while they both worked at the same vegan diner in Brooklyn. The pair soon discovered that they shared similar musical styles and, after a few jam sessions, began performing and recording music together.

The working moniker for the group was originally The Adventures of the Silver Spaceman, based on Ellis's solo work, but was rechristened as the newly formed Dead Tooth in March 2018. This name was inspired by the aftermath of a bicycle accident that had caused damage to the tissue surrounding Ellis's front incisor and ultimately left his tooth lifeless; rather than have the tooth capped or dyed white, he chose to embrace the look and uses it as a point of connection to people with similar dental stories.

The original lineup of Dead Tooth comprised Ellis (vocals), Bailey (guitar), Dylan DePice (drums), and Jason Smith (bass). The violinist River Allen aka Ghost Piss joined shortly after and the group released its first EP Still Beats through Five Kill Records in September 2018. Allen left the group in 2019, but the lineup otherwise stayed largely the same until the COVID-19 pandemic, after which Bailey, DePice, and Smith gradually left for other ventures.

Ellis met the saxophonist John Stanesco and guitarist Taylor Mitchell while working at a Kava bar in Brooklyn during the pandemic. Stanesco was asked to fill-in for Bailey on short notice, playing his guitar part on the saxophone instead, and started playing with the group regularly afterward. Mitchell was initially approached to perform as a stand-in for Bailey in wide shots of the music video to "Hot Summer" when he was unavailable to fly to New York for the shoot; Mitchell soon began playing lead guitar regularly as Bailey became less available. Around this time, Ellis also met the bassist James Duncan, who was a fan of Smith's bass playing, after performing a show. Stanesco, Mitchell, and Duncan all officially joined Dead Tooth in 2021. Ginno Tacsiat played the drums from 2020 to 2024, but had to leave due to other work commitments; he was succeeded as drummer by Michael Cohen, who has played with the group since 2024. The group has also collaborated with the Brooklyn-based dancer Nola Sporn Smith on the music videos for "Hot Summer" (2021) and "Blind" (2022).

Dead Tooth released their second EP Pig Pile in March 2022 through Trash Casual Records. Later that month, they also played their first shows at the Savannah Stopover Music Festival and the South by Southwest music festival. In January 2023, the band was listed by Spin magazine as one of "15 Artists to Watch" in the coming year. In March–April 2023, they toured along the Eastern United States with the garage punk band Bass Drum of Death.

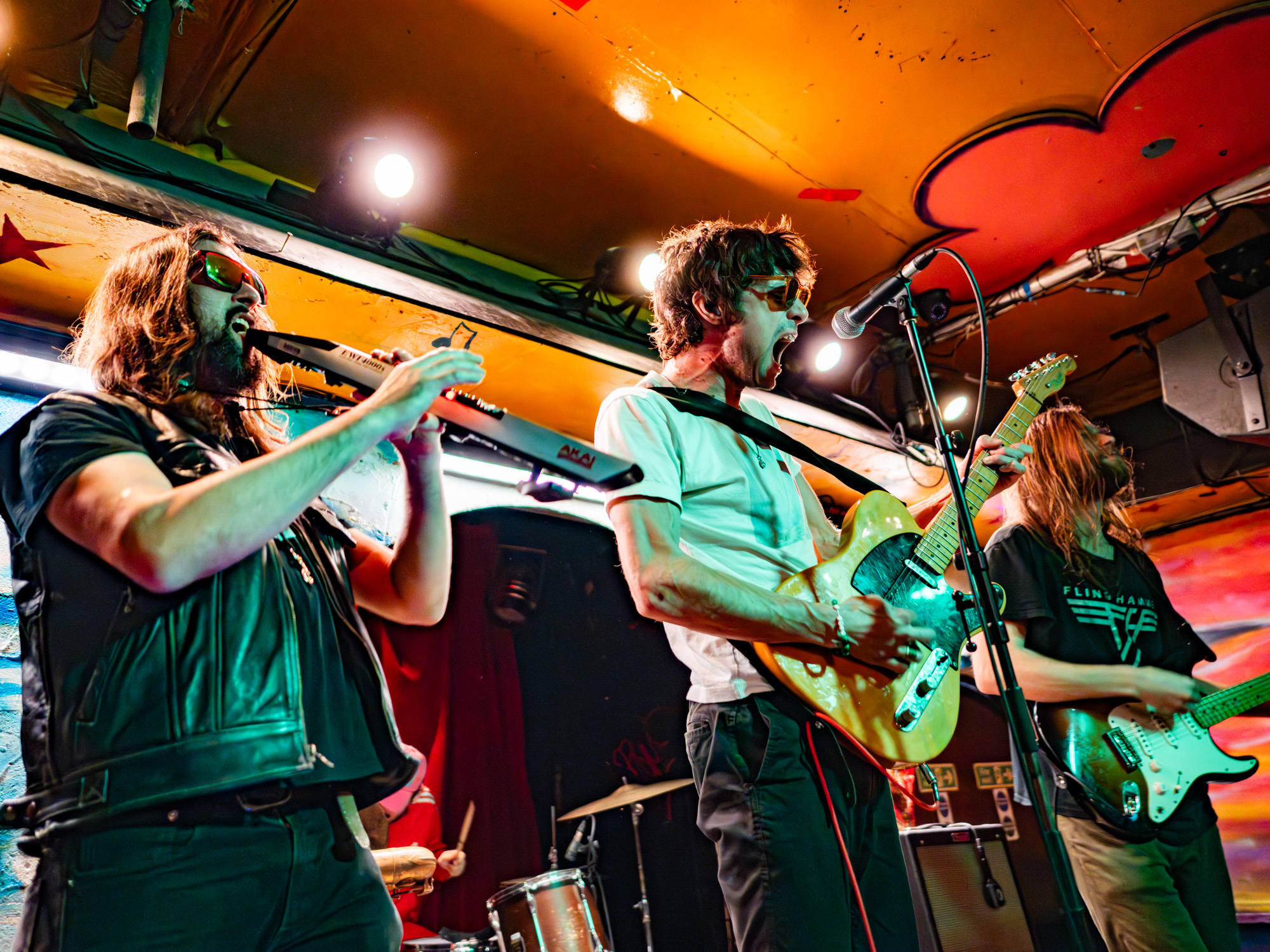
Dead Tooth at The Shacklewell Arms in London in 2024

Dead Tooth returned to the South by Southwest music festival in 2024; Clash magazine listed their performance as one of the 15 best acts from that year, remarking that they "stood out from the chasing pack by a country mile with their prime rock posing, lethal riffs, and soaked-to-the-brink-with-perspiration sense of post-punk deviance." The band later toured Europe in November–December 2024, playing concerts in Germany, the Netherlands, the United Kingdom, France, Spain, Switzerland, and Italy.

== Members ==
=== Current members ===
- Zach James Ellis (lead vocals and guitar) 2018–present
- John Stanesco (saxophone and EWI) 2021–present
- Taylor Mitchell (lead guitar) 2021–present
- James Duncan (bass) 2021–present
- Michael Cohen (drums) 2024–present

=== Former members ===
- Andrew Bailey (lead guitar) 2018–2022
- Dylan DePice (drums) 2018–2020, 2021–2022
- Jason Smith (bass) 2018–2022
- River Allen aka Ghost Piss (violin) 2018–2019
- Ethan Glenn (drums) 2019–2020
- Mark Brickman (lead guitar) 2019–2020
- Ginno Tacsiat (drums) 2020–2024
- Max Idas (guitar) 2021–2022

=== Touring musicians ===
- Gui Fuentes (drums)
- Jason Smith (bass)
- Charles McGrath (drums)
- Ozzie Silva (drums)
- Eric Silverman (drums)

== Discography ==
=== Extended plays ===
- Still Beats (2018, Five Kill Records)
- Pig Pile (2022, Trash Casual Records)
- Audiotree Live (2023)

=== Singles ===
- "Spirit" (2018)
- "Liars" (2018)
- "Make Me" (2020)
- "I Hate the Precedent" (with No Surrender) (2020)
- "Small Town" (with No Surrender) (2021)
- "Hell Shack" (2021)
- "Hot Summer" (2021)
- "Hollow Skin" (2022)
- "Blind" (2022)
- "River Boat" (2022)
- "Sporty Boy" (2022)
- "Electric Earth" (2023)
- "Cool for the Summer (Demi Lovato)" (2023)
- "Birthday Boohoo" (2024, Greenway Records)
- "Birthday Boohoo (A Place to Bury Strangers Remix)" (2024, Greenway Records)
