= Substance (song) =

2022 single by Demi Lovato

Single by Demi Lovato

from the album Holy Fvck
- Released: July 15, 2022
- Studio: SuCasa (Los Angeles)
- Genre: Pop-punk; alternative rock
- Length: 2:40
- Label: Island
- Songwriters: Demi Lovato; Alex Niceforo; Jutes; Keith Sorrells; Laura Veltz; Warren "Oak" Felder
- Producers: Oak; Alex Niceforo; Keith Sorrells

Demi Lovato singles chronology
"Skin of My Teeth" (2022)	"Substance" (2022)	"29" (2022)

Music video
- "Substance" on YouTube

"Substance" is a song by the American singer Demi Lovato from her eighth studio album, Holy Fvck (2022). Island Records released it on July 15, 2022, as the album's second single. Lovato co-wrote the track with Jutes, Laura Veltz, and its producers, Alex Niceforo, Keith Sorrells, and Warren "Oak" Felder. Musically, it is a pop-punk and alternative rock track that incorporates electric guitars and drums. The lyrical content of the song centers on a criticism of society and the lost connection in a virtual world, following the COVID-19 lockdowns and the exhaustion it entailed. It also evokes Lovato's personal struggles with addiction and mental health.

Cody Critcheloe directed the music video for "Substance", which was released alongside the song. With appearances by Paris Hilton and the Lovato impersonator Demetria Cherry, it sees Lovato in several sets and contains a reference to the American anti-drug campaign This is Your Brain on Drugs. Upon its release, the song received praise from music critics, mainly towards its lyrics. Commercially, it reached component charts in New Zealand and the United States. Lovato promoted "Substance" with live performances on various television programs, and as part of the set list of the Holy Fvck Tour (2022) and shows at music festivals.

== Release ==
Demi Lovato returned to rock-infused music with her eighth studio album, Holy Fvck. Teased since the beginning of 2022 with the stage of a "funeral" for her previous pop music, it was first preceded by the first single, "Skin of My Teeth", in June 2022. On June 30, 2022, Lovato announced the release of its follow-up titled "Substance". She shared its cover artwork, which depicts the singer sitting in a sphere with black liquid. The singer also uploaded a video singing along to a part of the song. Days later, Lovato uploaded a video with the track playing as the background audio and captioned it with, "Working on something for y'all".

The track list of Holy Fvck was revealed to include "Substance" as the third track. The song was released on July 15, 2022, as the album's second single. Commercially, "Substance" failed to enter the Billboard Hot 100 in the United States, while peaking at number 37 on the Hot Rock & Alternative Songs chart. It also reached number 34 on the New Zealand Hot Singles chart issued for July 22, 2022.

== Composition ==
"Substance" is two minutes and forty seconds long. Lovato, Laura Veltz, Jordan Lutes, Oak Felder, Keith Sorrells, and Alex Niceforo wrote it, while the latter three handled its production. Felder recorded the track at SuCasa in Los Angeles and played keyboards. He programmed it with Sorrells, who played other instruments alongside Niceforo. Manny Marroquin worked on the mixing with assistance from Chris Galland, Zach Pereyra, and Anthony Vilchis, while Chris Gehringer was in charge of its mastering.

Musically, "Substance" is a pop-punk and alternative rock song led by electric guitars and drums. Hannah Dailey of Billboard believed that the instrumentals were similar to those from late-1990s and early-2000s emo songs, while the author Sowing from Sputnikmusic compared it to the early discography by the American rock band Paramore. The lyrics of "Substance" are a criticism to the lost connection in a world led by virtual relations. It also evokes Lovato's personal struggles with drug addiction and mental health. For Genius, Lovato questioned if "have we all lost the substance of human connection and being in the present moment?" Billboard's Stephen Daw linked the song lyrics to the COVID-19 lockdowns, which started two years before the song's release, and the society's exhaustion that it entailed.

== Critical reception ==
Daw added "Substance" to a Billboard list of the best songs from its release week by queer musicians. The critic praised Lovato's vocal performance as "better-than-ever" and described the track as anthemic. Bailey Richards from Paper positively compared its sound to Lovato's 2008 single "La La Land", writing that she had "bigger things to be upset about than not being able to wear their converse with their dress". (Note: Lovato uses both she/her and they/them pronouns. While this article uses the former pronouns for consistency, the Paper source uses the latter.) Richards also praised her "signature powerhouse" vocals. In a review of Holy Fvck, Pitchfork's Olivia Horn applauded the "cheeky wordplay" of "Am I the only one looking for substance?", and said that it "helps save the song from its hand-wringing generalizations". Callie Ahlgrim of Business Insider named "Substance" the seventh best track on Holy Fvck and lauded its double entendre of searching for meaning and Lovato's own life with addiction struggles. In 2023, Jeffrey Davies of PopMatters ranked "Substance" at number 14 on a ranking of the best Lovato songs up to that year; he praised its authenticity and said that it "flips the bird to every boundary ever imposed on her".

== Music video ==
The music video for "Substance" was directed by Cody Critcheloe and released alongside the song. It contains appearances by the drag queen and Lovato impersonator Demetria Cherry and the American media personality Paris Hilton. Lovato wears nostalgic outfits throughout the video. Emily Zemler of Rolling Stone said that it evokes 1990s and 2000s pop-punk music videos, and Rebekah Gonzalez from iHeartRadio believed that it was "raucous" and "as fed-up as the song's lyrics".

The video shows Lovato with a bob cut and bangs in business meetings and television sets. In the former, she smashes a glass music certification with a baseball bat and intentionally falls from the window. The singer later paints the album's title on a wall. A scene references the American anti-drug campaign This is Your Brain on Drugs. Other scenarios from the video include a diner and a house party. At the end of the video, Lovato goes to a red carpet and gets on a pink motorcycle with Hilton before they stare at the camera and light a dynamite.

== Live performances ==
On July 14, 2022, Lovato performed "Substance" live for the first time on Jimmy Kimmel Live!. She wore a black and punk-inspired outfit and was backed by a band that included the American guitarist Nita Strauss. On July 27, Lovato posted a video rehearsing for her then-upcoming concert tour with "Substance" in the background, accompanied by an all-female band. The song was included in the regular set list of her seventh concert tour, the Holy Fvck Tour, in 2022. Lovato sang it while playing guitar as part of the first high-energy songs of the shows. Subsequently, she performed it at the 2022 edition of the Brazilian festival Rock in Rio, and also at the Illinois State Fair and Iowa State Fair. Lovato performed the track on The Tonight Show Starring Jimmy Fallon on August 17, and again two days after on Good Morning America.

== Credits and personnel ==
Obtained from Lovato's official website.

- Demi Lovato – vocals, songwriting
- Warren "Oak" Felder – production, songwriting, recording, programming, keyboards
- Keith "Ten4" Sorrells – songwriting, co-production, programming, guitar, bass, drums
- Alex Niceforo – songwriting, co-production, guitar
- Jutes – songwriting
- Laura Veltz – songwriting
- Oscar Linnander – recording, production assistance,
- Manny Marroquin – mixing
- Chris Galland – mixing engineering
- Zach Pereyra – mixing engineering
- Anthony Vilchis – mixing engineering
- Chris Gehringer – mastering

== Charts ==
Chart performance for "Substance"
Chart (2022)	Peak position
New Zealand Hot Singles (RMNZ)	34
US Hot Rock & Alternative Songs (Billboard)	37
