= Skin o' My Tooth =

Skin O' My Tooth
- First edition cover
- Author: Baroness Orczy
- Language: English
- Genre: Mystery
- Published: 1928
- Publication place: United Kingdom
- Media type: Print

Skin O' My tooth, aka Patrick Mulligan, was created by Baroness Emmuska Orczy (author of the Scarlet Pimpernel series), and appeared in twelve mystery short stories which were collected in Skin o' My Tooth. His Memoirs, By His Confidential Clerk (1928).

Mulligan is represented as an ugly, portly, but particularly sharp Irish lawyer who goes to great lengths (even unscrupulous ones) to get his clients off. Usually this involves him solving the crimes himself. The stories are narrated by his confidential clerk Alexander Stanislaus Mullins, whom Mulligan insists on referring to as "Muggins".

Mulligan's nickname comes from one client who described Mulligan freeing him "by the skin o' my tooth." In his narration, Mullins almost exclusively refers to his employer by the nickname.

fat and rosy and comfortable as an Irish pig, with a face as stodgy as a boiled currant dumpling. His hair, I believe, would be red if he gave it a chance at all, but he wears it cropped so close to his bulky head that he looks bald in some lights.

== Stories ==
The following stories first appeared in The Windsor Magazine (June - November) 1903:

- The Murder in Saltashe Woods
- The Case of the Polish Prince (also titled The Case of the Sicilian Prince)
- The Case of Major Gibson
- The Duffield Peerage Case
- The Case of Mrs. Norris
- The Murton-Braby Murder

Other stories featuring the character include:

- The Kazan Pearls
- The Inverted Five
- The Turquoise Stud
- Overwhelming Evidence
- A Shot in the Night
- The Hungarian Landowner
