= Skin of My Teeth =

2022 single by Demi Lovato

Single by Demi Lovato

from the album Holy Fvck
- Written: January 2022
- Released: June 10, 2022
- Recorded: January 2022
- Studio: SuCasa (Los Angeles, California)
- Genre: Rock; pop-punk; grunge; alternative rock
- Length: 2:42
- Label: Island
- Songwriters: Demi Lovato; Oak Felder; Alex Niceforo; Keith Sorrells; Laura Veltz; Lil Aaron
- Producers: Oak Felder; Alex Niceforo; Keith "Ten4" Sorrells

Demi Lovato singles chronology
"Breakdown" (2021)	"Skin of My Teeth" (2022)	"Substance" (2022)

Music video
- "Skin of My Teeth" on YouTube

"Skin of My Teeth" is a song by the American singer Demi Lovato from her eighth studio album, Holy Fvck (2022). Island Records released it on June 10, 2022, as the album's lead single. She co-wrote the song with Oak Felder, Alex Niceforo, Keith "Ten4" Sorrells, Laura Veltz, and Lil Aaron, while the former three handled its production. "Skin of My Teeth" is a rock, pop-punk, grunge, and alternative rock track, led by electric guitars and drums. Lyrically, it deals with society's criticisms about addictions and drug rehabilitation, as well as Lovato's own struggles. Its title references the biblical phrase "skin of my teeth".

The song received positive reviews from music critics, many of whom lauded its theme and Lovato's vocals. They drew comparisons between "Skin of My Teeth" and the works of Hole—specifically the 1998 single "Celebrity Skin". The song appeared on component charts in New Zealand, the United Kingdom, and the United States.

Nick Harwood directed the music video for "Skin of My Teeth", which was released alongside the song. It features Lovato confronting an ominous figure representing addiction and the media, as well as scenes of the singer performing with an electric guitar shooting out sparks. To support its release, Lovato premiered the track on The Tonight Show Starring Jimmy Fallon. She included it on the regular set list of her seventh concert tour, the Holy Fvck Tour (2022), and performed it at several festivals.

== Background and release ==
In early 2022, Demi Lovato announced her departure from pop music as she held a "funeral" for it on her social media accounts. The announcement included a photo with her management dressed in all-black. Lovato started teasing what would be her eighth studio album, and told Rolling Stone's Tomás Mier that it would have some "heaviness" in its sound. Mier asked her if she was coming back to her "rock, emo early days", and she answered, "That, but better". While sharing teasers of then-unreleased songs, she wrote on Instagram Stories that she was "so proud" of her new music, and said that it was her "absolute best yet". She labeled it as her return to her rock and pop-punk roots which she had experimented with on her first two albums, Don't Forget (2008) and Here We Go Again (2009). She described it as a "new era reminiscent of [her] first era".

On May 23, 2022, after several speculations, Lovato confirmed that the lead single from the album would be called "Skin of My Teeth". Days later, the song's release date and cover artwork were revealed; the image features Lovato with dark makeup and an all-black outfit with spikes and chains. She additionally published a video with mock newspaper headlines about her, with the song playing in the background. Lovato announced the release of Holy Fvck on June 6. "Skin of My Teeth" was released on June 10 through Island Records; it was promoted by billboards.

== Composition ==
"Skin of My Teeth" is 2 minutes and 42 seconds long. The track was produced by Oak Felder, co-produced by Alex Niceforo and Keith Sorrells, and written by Lovato and the three alongside Laura Veltz and Lil Aaron. All of them also provided background vocals. It was mastered by Chris Gehringer, while Oscar Linnander handled production assistance and recording. Manny Marroquin mixed it with assistance from Zach Pereyra, Trey Station, and Anthony Vilchis. The song was written and recorded during January 2022 at SuCasa in Los Angeles, California.

Musically, "Skin of My Teeth" is a rock, pop-punk,, grunge, and alternative rock song, led by electric guitar and drums. Described by Stereogum's Tom Breihan as "bright, fired-up arena-level", the song has a more potent sound than Lovato's previous releases. Music critics found similarities between "Skin of My Teeth" and the works of the American band Hole, including the band's 1998 single "Celebrity Skin". NPR's Reanna Cruz also compared the vocal affectations of the song to those of Lady Gaga's "Born This Way" (2011). The energy of the guitar tones is reminiscent of the rock musicians Pat Benatar and Joan Jett, according to Loudwire's Joe DiVita.

The lyrics of "Skin of My Teeth" focus on Lovato's struggles with substance abuse, and discusses drug rehabilitation along with the desire to be free from the disease she was enduring. Lovato declares that she barely escaped death and survived "by the skin of [her] teeth", a reference to the biblical phrase that describes a situation from which one has hardly managed to escape. Lovato previously opened up about becoming sober following her near-fatal overdose in 2018 on her documentary Demi Lovato: Dancing with the Devil, published three years after. In the song's annotations on Genius, Lovato stated that the opening line of "Skin of My Teeth"—"Demi leaves rehab again"—alludes to a rehab visit: "It was a headline that I saw multiple times and I just felt like it was no one's business". She also described the lyric "I'm your son and I'm your daughter, I'm your mother, I'm your father" as emotive, saying that is meant to humanize addiction as a struggle that many individuals face.

== Critical reception ==
Cruz described "Skin of My Teeth" as a fun listening experience, but described the opening line as "cringe-worthy". She praised Lovato as having a "level of camp" in her art with genuineness and commitment to her music, unlike "other pop-punk revivalists". Breihan also noted this, praising Lovato for not having "the fake edginess" of other contemporary musicians of the genre. Ellise Shafer from Variety described the lyrics of "Skin of My Teeth" as "brutally honest", with "Lovato's powerhouse vocals urgently conveying [her] most upfront lyricism yet". Other critics, including Breihan and Uproxx's Danielle Chelosky, also highlighted the singer's vocals; the latter found them "brazen and unafraid".

In a review of Holy Fvck, Tom Williams of The Line of Best Fit believed that "Skin of My Teeth" showcases the album's strengths, as it is "unrelentingly intense and unmistakably autobiographical". For Billboard, Stephen Daw named "Skin of My Teeth" the "true introduction" to Holy Fvck over the opening track "Freak", and placed it at number nine in a ranking of the album's songs. Loudwire ranked it as the 68th best rock or metal song of 2022. Business Insider contributor Callie Ahlgrim called "Skin of My Teeth" one of the biggest snubs of the 65th Annual Grammy Awards nominations.

== Music video ==
The music video for "Skin of My Teeth" was directed by Nick Harwood, and premiered on June 10, 2022. It begins with Lovato singing from a bathtub as an ominous figure reads headlines about her recent visit to rehab and stalks her with a camera. Eventually, the pair come face to face in a confrontation that Lovato wins, while she ends the song with a rain sequence that features her electric guitar shooting out sparks. Vulture's Wolfgang Ruth said that the image of the figure haunting Lovato while sitting in a bathtub represented addictions, while iHeartRadio's Rebekah Gonzalez said that it could be a personification of the media. Breihan compared her appearance in the video to the style of Joan Jett.

== Live performances ==
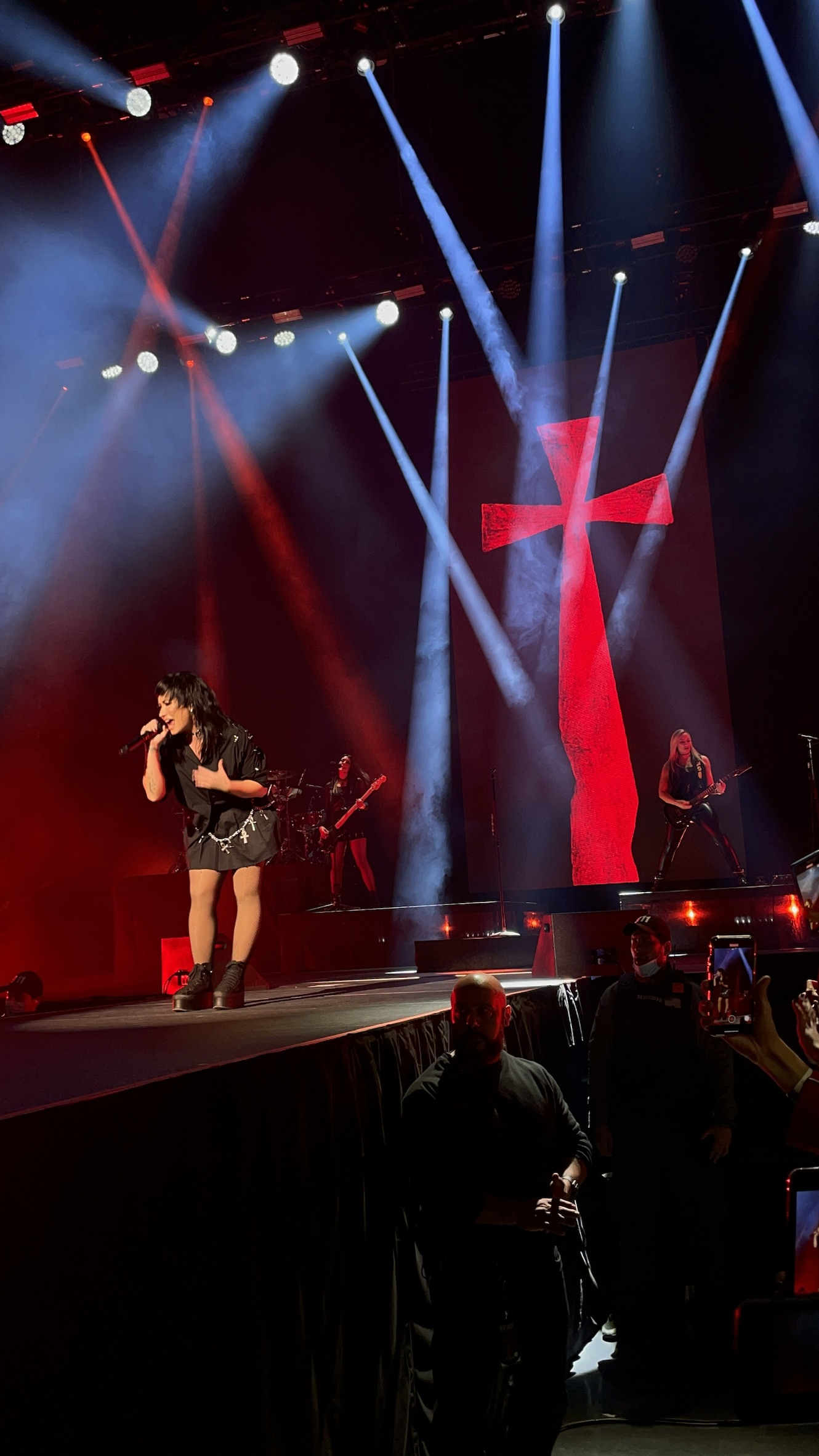
Lovato performing "Skin of My Teeth" on the Holy Fvck Tour in September 2022

Lovato performed "Skin of My Teeth" for the first time on The Tonight Show Starring Jimmy Fallon, hours before its release. She appeared wearing all black, accompanied by a guitar and surrounded by fog. Chelosky described the performance as cathartic and "stronger than ever". The song was included in the regular set list of Lovato's seventh concert tour, the Holy Fvck Tour, in 2022. She sang it as the last song before the encore, roaming around the stage without a microphone stand or guitar. Subsequently, she performed it at the 2022 edition of the Brazilian festival Rock in Rio, and also at the Illinois State Fair and Iowa State Fair.

== Credits and personnel ==
Credits obtained from Lovato's official website.

- Demi Lovato – vocals, songwriting
- Oak Felder – production, songwriting, recording, programming, background vocals, keyboards, engineering
- Keith "Ten4" Sorrells – songwriting, programming, co-production, background vocals, guitar, bass, drums
- Laura Veltz – songwriting, background vocals
- Lil Aaron – songwriting, background vocals
- Alex Niceforo – songwriting, co-production, background vocals, guitar
- Oscar Linnander – recording, production assistance
- Manny Marroquin – mixing
- Zach Pereyra – mixing assistance
- Anthony Vilchis – mixing assistance
- Trey Station – mixing assistance
- Chris Gehringer – mastering

== Charts ==
Chart performance for "Skin of My Teeth"
Chart (2022)	Peak position
New Zealand Hot Singles (RMNZ)	19
UK Singles Downloads (Official Charts)	56
UK Singles Sales (OCC)	58
US Digital Song Sales (Billboard)	47
US Hot Rock & Alternative Songs (Billboard)	13
