= 29 (Demi Lovato song) =

2022 single by Demi Lovato

- Vevo "Official Live Performance" cover

Single by Demi Lovato

from the album Holy Fvck
- Released: August 17, 2022
- Studio: SuCasa (Los Angeles)
- Genre: Rock
- Length: 2:43
- Label: Island
- Songwriters: Demi Lovato; Oak Felder; Alex Niceforo; Keith Sorrells; Laura Veltz; Sean Douglas
- Producers: Oak Felder; Alex Niceforo; Keith "Ten4" Sorrells

Demi Lovato singles chronology
| "Substance" (2022) | "29" (2022) | "Still Alive" (2023) |

Lyric video
- "29" on YouTube

"29" is a song by the American singer Demi Lovato from her eighth studio album, Holy Fvck (2022). She wrote it alongside Laura Veltz, Sean Douglas, and its producers, Oak Felder, Alex Niceforo, and Keith Sorrells. Island Records released it on August 17, 2022, as the album's third single. "29" is a rock song led by guitars and drums, with lyrics about a relationship Lovato had with an older man and how she was manipulated by him. It became a viral trend on the video-sharing app TikTok, prompting people to share their stories about grooming. The song was subject to several pieces of speculation for its lyrical content.

Upon its release, "29" received positive reviews from music critics, many of whom praised its lyrical theme. Some publications named it the best track on Holy Fvck, while others deemed it one of the best songs released in 2022. Commercially, it was the album's only track to chart on the US Billboard Hot 100, while also reaching the Canadian Hot 100 and Billboard Global 200. The song received a platinum certification in Brazil. A Vevo-produced live performance video was uploaded on August 22, 2022. Lovato performed "29" on The Tonight Show Starring Jimmy Fallon, Good Morning America, and as part of the set list in the Holy Fvck Tour (2022).

== Release ==
Drawing inspiration from the American rock band Dead Sara, Demi Lovato staged a "funeral" for her former pop music in January 2022, prior to returning to the rock genre that she experimented with on her first two studio albums, Don't Forget (2008) and Here We Go Again (2009). On June 6, 2022, Lovato announced her eighth studio album, Holy Fvck, set to release on August 19. A press release indicated that the album would include sixteen tracks. In the following month, she revealed its track listing, which included "29" as the sixth song. Prior to its release, Lovato shared various snippets of "29" on social media. She first teased the song on August 9, 2022, showcasing the chorus's lyrics. The song was first announced as the album's third single by Billboard. It was officially confirmed as a single by Lovato and was released to digital platforms on August 17, 2022, through Island Records. A "stripped" remix of the track was released on September 20, 2022.

== Composition and lyrical interpretation ==
"29" has a duration of two minutes and forty-three seconds. Lovato provided the lead vocals and wrote the song with Sean Douglas, Laura Veltz, Alex Niceforo, Oak Felder, and Keith "Ten4" Sorrells, all of whom also provided background vocals. The latter three played instruments, produced, and programmed the track. Felder and Oscar Linnander recorded it at SuCasa in Los Angeles. Chris Gehringer and Manny Marroquin were in charge of its mastering and mixing, respectively; the latter was assisted by Zach Pereyra, Trey Station, and Anthony Vilchis.

The lyrical content of "29" depicts a long-term relationship that Lovato had with an older man and her displeasure with how she was manipulated by him. Upon posting a snippet of the song on the video-sharing app TikTok, fans speculated that the lyrics were a reference to Lovato's ex-partner Wilmer Valderrama, whom she dated for 6 years and met at 17 years old, although they publicly started dating when she was 18. The song quickly became a viral trend on the app, prompting people to share their stories about grooming and abusive relationships with an "inappropriate" age gap. Publications also believed that Lovato included a verse about Valderrama's relationship with Amanda Pacheco, who was 12 years younger: "I see you're quite the collector / Yeah you're twelve years her elder".

In an interview with Apple Music 1's Zane Lowe, Lovato did not confirm the song's subject matter and believed that it "says it all". She also mentioned feeling anxious about releasing the song. Speaking with Alexandra Cooper on Call Her Daddy, the singer discussed gaining "understanding and growth" after turning 29 and leaving treatment. Lovato also described the song as "reflective" and stated "I really learned a lot about that experience".

== Critical reception ==
"29" received positive reviews from music critics. Sonically, the song was described by James Hall of The Daily Telegraph as "a soaring slab of radio-friendly rock". The song's lyrics received praise. The staff of Sputnikmusic wrote that it "immediately raise[d] the stakes lyrically". AllMusic's Neil Yeung claimed that "29" marked the "most attention-grabbing moment" on the album and described it as "a scathing takedown of a past relationship with eye-popping lyrics". Emily Swingle of Clash stated that "nothing compares to the raw pain captured on the song". She highlighted it as a standout and praised Lovato's powerful vocals and soaring drums and guitars.

Reviewers included "29" in rankings of the best songs from Holy Fvck. Callie Ahlgrim of Business Insider named it the best song on the album; she praised the way that Lovato "manages to sing from a place of wisdom and maturity without shying away from the details", and the inclusion of "frank references to menstruation and daddy issues". Billboard journalist Stephen Daw ranked it as the fourth-best song on the album and stated that it "sounds like the kind of musing that comes after years of finding the right words to say about a traumatic event". The Los Angeles Times and Samantha Olson of Seventeen named "29" one of the best songs released in 2022. In 2023, Jeffrey Davies of PopMatters ranked "29" at number seven in a ranking of the best Lovato songs released up to that year.

== Commercial performance ==
"29" debuted and peaked at number 96 on the US Billboard Hot 100, her 36th entry and the only song from Holy Fvck to appear on the chart to date. It also became her first top-ten single on the Hot Rock & Alternative Songs chart. Outside the United States, it charted at number 95 on the Canadian Hot 100 for one week, and at number 167 on the Billboard Global 200. Additionally, "29" peaked at number 14 on the secondary New Zealand Hot Singles chart published by Recorded Music NZ. In 2024, the song received a platinum certification from Pro-Música Brasil after selling 40,000 units in the country.

== Live performances ==
Lovato performed "29" on The Tonight Show Starring Jimmy Fallon on August 18, 2022, as part of her three-night takeover of the show to promote Holy Fvck. On the following day, she sang it on Good Morning America along with "Substance" (2022) and "Cool for the Summer" (2015). She included the song in the set list of her seventh concert tour, the Holy Fvck Tour (2022). Some critics praised the performances and Lovato's speeches beforehand as the most powerful moment of the shows. The official Vevo live performance of the song was uploaded to YouTube on August 22, 2022; Rania Aniftos of Billboard praised Lovato's vocals, which "amplifies the scathing lyrics".

== Credits and personnel ==
Obtained from Lovato's official website.

- Demi Lovato - vocals, songwriting
- Warren "Oak" Felder - production, songwriting, recording, programming, background vocals, drums, keyboards
- Alex Niceforo - songwriting, co-production, programming, background vocals, guitar
- Keith "Ten4" Sorrells - songwriting, co-production, programming, background vocals, guitar, bass, drums
- Sean Douglas - songwriting, background vocals
- Laura Veltz - songwriting, background vocals
- Oscar Linnander - production assistance
- Manny Marroquin - mixing
- Zach Pereyra - mixing assistance
- Anthony Vilchis - mixing assistance
- Trey Station - mixing assistance
- Chris Gehringer - mastering

== Charts ==
Chart performance for "29"
| Chart (2022) | Peak position |
|---|---|
| Canada Hot 100 (Billboard) | 95 |
| Global 200 (Billboard) | 167 |
| New Zealand Hot Singles (RMNZ) | 14 |
| US Billboard Hot 100 | 96 |
| US Hot Rock & Alternative Songs (Billboard) | 10 |

== Certifications ==
Certifications for "29"
| Region | Certification | Certified units/sales |
|---|---|---|
| Brazil (Pro-Música Brasil) | Platinum | 40,000^{‡} |
^{‡} Sales+streaming figures based on certification alone.
