= Holy Fvck Tour =

2022 concert tour by Demi Lovato

- Tour by Demi Lovato
- Promotional poster for the tour
- Location: North America; South America
- Associated album: Holy Fvck
- Start date: August 13, 2022
- End date: November 10, 2022
- Legs: 3
- No. of shows: 34
- Supporting acts: Dead Sara; Royal & the Serpent; Iyla; Tuyo; Jennifer Souza; Dani Ride; Pavlo; Odd Mami; Greg Pearson

Demi Lovato concert chronology
- Tell Me You Love Me World Tour (2018); Holy Fvck Tour (2022); It's Not That Deep Tour (2026)

The Holy Fvck Tour was the seventh concert tour by the American singer Demi Lovato. Produced by Live Nation Entertainment, Lovato embarked on it in support of her eighth studio album, Holy Fvck (2022). Consisting of 34 dates, it began in Springfield, Illinois, on August 13, 2022, and concluded in Rosemont, Illinois, on November 10. The tour visited both North and South America, with shows at Rock in Rio and two state fair festivals. Dead Sara and Royal & the Serpent were part of the supporting acts.

The set list included songs from Holy Fvck, as well as earlier singles from Lovato's discography and two cover versions performed as part of mashups: Ashlee Simpson's "La La" (2004) and the Goo Goo Dolls' "Iris" (1998). Some tracks received rock-infused rearrangements to match the album's sound. Critics gave the tour positive reviews, with praise towards Lovato's vocal performance.

== Background and development ==
On June 6, 2022, Demi Lovato went to social media to announce her eighth studio album, Holy Fvck, which was dubbed as a return to pop-punk and rock music that she experimented with on her early career. The next day, she revealed that she would be embarking on its accompanying concert tour in 31 dates between August 13 and November 6. The American band Dead Sara and the American singer-songwriter Royal & the Serpent were revealed as supporting acts for selected North American dates. Following a hiatus of over four years without touring, Lovato expressed her excitement to "get back on the road". She also stated that she was "working so hard to deliver an incredible show for all [her] fans". Prior to the start of the concert tour, produced by Live Nation Entertainment, Lovato shared a video of a rehearsal with an all-female band, performing "Substance", one of the album's singles.

== Concert synopsis ==
Silhouettes would be projected to a curtain before it fell and revealed the performers; Lovato and her backing band—composed of guitarist Nita Strauss, drummer Brittany Bowman, bassist Leanne Bowes, and keyboardist Dani McGinley—would begin the ninety-minute long show to perform a series of songs from Holy Fvck: The title track, "Freak", "Substance", and "Eat Me". Lovato thanked the attendees of the concert and the band. They then proceeded to perform earlier singles from Lovato's discography: "Here We Go Again", "Remember December", and "La La Land", which was part of a mashup with Ashlee Simpson's "La La". Before singing "29", Lovato expressed her love to anyone who related to the song. Pop singles including "Sorry Not Sorry", "Heart Attack", and "Cool for the Summer" received a renewed rock-infused arrangemeent. The latter song was the final song from the show, performed as part of the encore along with "Happy Ending".

== Reception ==
Several critics believed that the most powerful moment of the shows was the performance of "29" and Lovato's speech beforehand. Carl Smith of the Official Charts Company praised the "amazing" covers of "La La" and "Iris", and believed that fans of Simpson's album Autobiography (2004) were going to be "very happy". Other reviewers praised Lovato's vocal performance: Bobby Olivier from NJ.com felt that she "never appeared more at home", and Mike DeWalf from Riff Magazine believed that the performance of "Skyscraper" showcased "her versatility as a performer". Additionally, the former lauded the sound for being "well beyond chasing any pop-punk resurgence trend", while the latter said that the decision of bringing Dead Sara to the tour was "wise".

== Set list ==
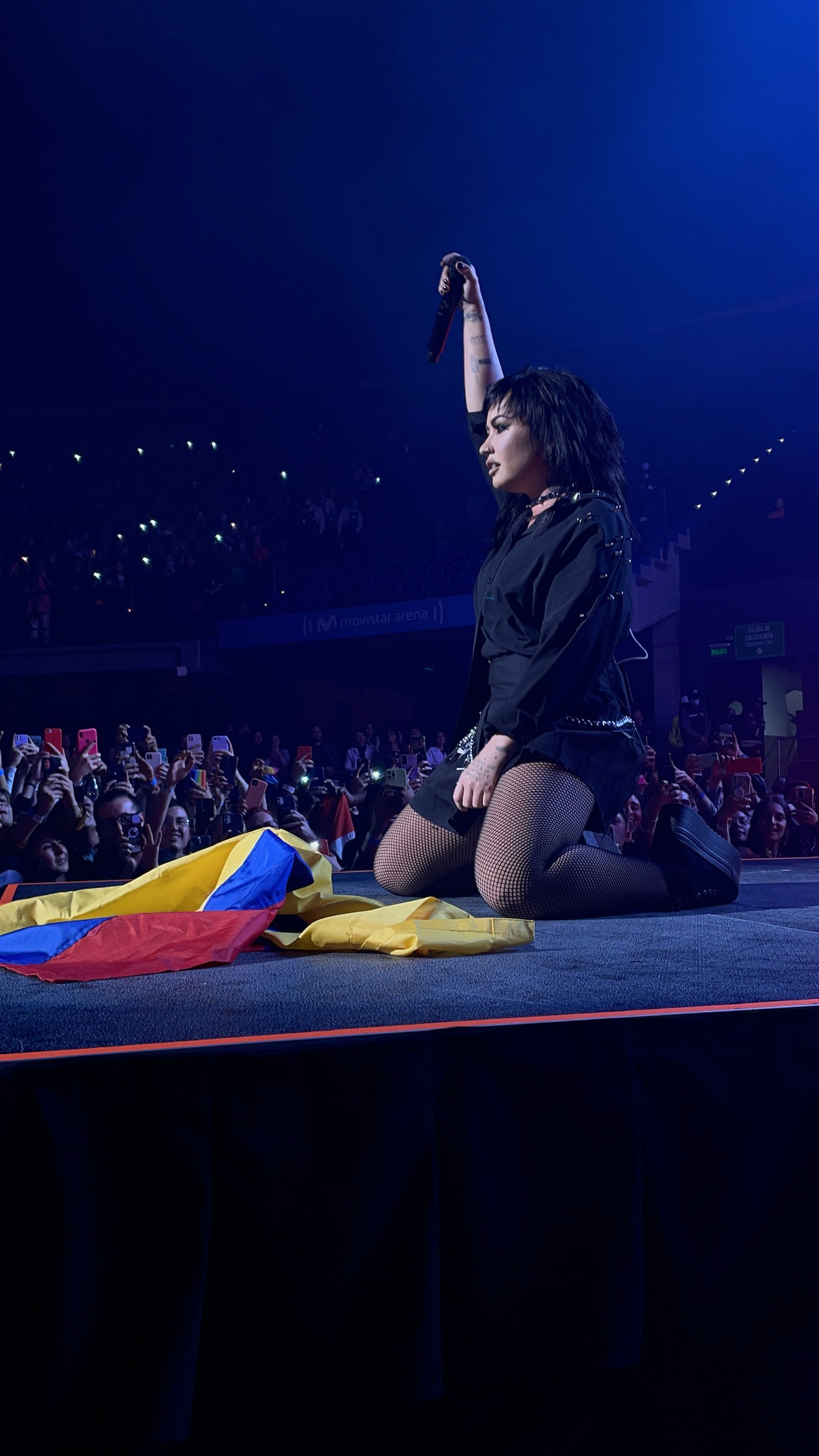
Lovato performing in Bogotá, Colombia, during the Holy Fvck Tour

This set list was taken from the concert on October 18, 2022, in New York City. It does not represent all shows throughout the tour.

1. "Holy Fvck"
2. "Freak"
3. "Substance"
4. "Eat Me"
5. "Confident"
6. "Here We Go Again"
7. "Remember December"
8. "La La Land" / "La La"
9. "Don't Forget"
10. "The Art of Starting Over"
11. "4 Ever 4 Me" / "Iris"
12. "Sorry Not Sorry"
13. "City of Angels"
14. "Skyscraper"
15. "29"
16. "Heart Attack"
17. "Skin of My Teeth"
  Encore
18. "Happy Ending"
19. "Cool for the Summer"

Notes

- Dead Sara joined Lovato to perform "Help Me" replacing "The Art of Starting Over" in selected dates.
- Royal & the Serpent joined Lovato to perform "Eat Me" in selected dates.
- During the show in Inglewood, Simpson joined Lovato on stage to perform "La La".
- During the first show in New York City, John Rzeznik of the Goo Goo Dolls joined Lovato to perform "Iris".

== Shows ==
List of 2022 concerts, showing date, city, country, venue, and opening act(s)
Date (2022)	City	Country	Venue	Opening act(s)
August 13 (Note: The concert on August 13, 2022, at the Illinois State Fairgrounds in Springfield is part of Illinois State Fair.)	Springfield	United States	Illinois State Fairgrounds	Iyla
August 14 (Note: The concert on August 14, 2022, at the Iowa State Fairgrounds in Des Moines is part of Iowa State Fair.)	Des Moines	United States	Iowa State Fairgrounds	Iyla
August 30	São Paulo	Brazil	Espaço Unimed	Tuyo
August 31	São Paulo	Brazil	Espaço Unimed	Tuyo
September 2	Belo Horizonte	Brazil	Mineirão	Jennifer Souza
September 4 (Note: The concert on September 4, 2022, at the Barra Olympic Park in Rio de Janeiro is part of Rock in Rio.)	Rio de Janeiro (Note: Promoted as Barra da Tijuca)	Brazil	Barra Olympic Park	—
September 7	Bogotá	Colombia	Movistar Arena	Pavlo
September 9	Buenos Aires (Note: Promoted as Comuna 15)	Argentina	Movistar Arena	Odd Mami
September 13	Santiago	Chile	Movistar Arena	Dani Ride
September 22	Wheatland (Note: Promoted as Sacramento)	United States	Hard Rock Live	Dead Sara
September 23	Reno	United States	Grand Sierra Theatre	Dead Sara
September 25	Portland	United States	Theater of the Clouds	Dead Sara
September 27	San Francisco	United States	SF Masonic Auditorium	Dead Sara
September 28	Inglewood	United States	YouTube Theater	Royal & the Serpent
September 30	Paradise (Note: Promoted as Las Vegas)	United States	Venetian Theatre	Royal & the Serpent
October 3	Denver	United States	Fillmore Auditorium	Royal & the Serpent
October 9	Wallingford	United States	Toyota Oakdale Theatre	Royal & the Serpent
October 10	Washington, D.C.	United States	The Anthem	Royal & the Serpent
October 12	Philadelphia	United States	The Met Philadelphia	Royal & the Serpent
October 13	Boston	United States	MGM Music Hall at Fenway	Royal & the Serpent
October 15	Toronto	Canada	History	Royal & the Serpent
October 16	Montreal	Canada	L'Olympia	Royal & the Serpent
October 18	New York	United States	Beacon Theatre	Royal & the Serpent
October 19	New York	United States	Beacon Theatre	Royal & the Serpent
October 21	Charlotte	United States	Charlotte Metro Credit Union Amphitheatre	Dead Sara
October 23	Cumberland (Note: Promoted as Atlanta)	United States	Coca-Cola Roxy	Dead Sara
October 25	Nashville	United States	Ryman Auditorium	Dead Sara
October 28	Tampa Indian Reservation (Note: Promoted as Tampa)	United States	Seminole Hard Rock	Dead Sara
October 30	Hollywood	United States	Hard Rock Live	Dead Sara
November 1	New Orleans	United States	The Fillmore	Dead Sara
November 3	Houston	United States	713 Music Hall	Dead Sara
November 6	Irving	United States	The Pavilion at Toyota Music Factory	Dead Sara
November 9 (Note: The concert on November 9, 2022, at the Fox Theatre in Detroit was originally scheduled for October 7, but was rescheduled due to loss of voice.)	Detroit	United States	Fox Theatre	Royal & the Serpent
November 10 (Note: The concert on November 10, 2022, at the Rosemont Theatre in Rosemont was originally scheduled for October 5, but was rescheduled due to loss of voice.)	Rosemont	United States	Rosemont Theatre	Royal & the Serpent
