= Holy Fvck =

2022 studio album by Demi Lovato

- Standard cover

Studio album by Demi Lovato
- Released: August 19, 2022
- Studio: SuCasa (Los Angeles)
- Genres: Hard rock; pop-punk
- Length: 47:48
- Label: Island
- Producers: Warren "Oak" Felder; Mitch Allan; Alex Niceforo; Keith "Ten4" Sorrells

Demi Lovato chronology
Dancing with the Devil... the Art of Starting Over (2021)	Holy Fvck (2022)	Revamped (2023)

Singles from Holy Fvck
- 1. "Skin of My Teeth" Released: June 10, 2022; 2. "Substance" Released: July 15, 2022; 3. "29" Released: August 17, 2022

Holy Fvck is the eighth studio album by the American singer Demi Lovato, released on August 19, 2022, through Island Records. Primarily a hard rock and pop-punk record, Lovato conceived it as a return to the early rock-influenced sound from her first two studio albums, Don't Forget (2008) and Here We Go Again (2009). The lyrical themes explore Lovato's sexual identity with religious undertones.

Most of the album was produced by Warren "Oak" Felder, Alex Niceforo, and Keith "Ten4" Sorrells, with additional production from Mitch Allan on three tracks. Yungblud, Royal & the Serpent, and Dead Sara appear as featured artists. The album's lead single, "Skin of My Teeth", was released on June 10, 2022. "Substance" and "29" followed as the second and third singles respectively; the latter became the album's only song to chart on the US Billboard Hot 100. To promote Holy Fvck, Lovato embarked on the Holy Fvck Tour throughout North America and South America between August and November 2022. A promotional poster of the album and tour was banned in the United Kingdom by the Advertising Standards Authority for allegedly offending Christians.

Upon its release, Holy Fvck received positive reviews from music critics, appearing in year-end lists of the best music from 2022. Commercially, it peaked at number seven in the United States and the United Kingdom, while also reaching the top 20 in the Flanders region of Belgium, Portugal, Scotland, and Spain. Additionally, the album debuted atop the US Top Alternative Albums and Top Rock Albums charts. For Holy Fvck, Lovato received a nomination at the 34th GLAAD Media Awards for Outstanding Music Artist.

== Background ==
Demi Lovato first considered the kind of music she wished to make for her eighth studio album in 2021, following the release of Ain't It Tragic by the American rock band Dead Sara that year. She remarked that "it reignited this flame inside of me. I was like, 'I want to do rock music.' I saw them on tour and was super stoked about their music and was just like, 'That's what I want to go back to.' It felt right to me because I hadn't done it in a while. I wanted to return to my roots."

In January 2022, Lovato posted on Instagram that she held a "funeral" for her former pop music, with a picture of Lovato with label and management executives all wearing black and Lovato holding up two middle fingers. This was later clarified to be a music label meeting and the fact everyone was wearing black was simply a coincidence, but Lovato had felt it was symbolic of a change in direction that her music was taking. In the months following this event, Lovato enthusiastically shared various snippets of a more rock sound on her social media, with "crashing guitars, soaring vocals and cutting lyrics". In an interview with Rolling Stone in February 2022, Lovato confirmed a return to "emo-rock" that was "reminiscent of my first era". Lovato clarified, however, that her new studio album would differ from her debut album Don't Forget (2008), in that it has a "heaviness" not lyrically, but "heaviness as in some of the sound that I haven't done before". Lovato also spoke to Inked, confirming her new album is "definitely not R&B or soulful, I would say it's more rock than anything" and that it was inspired by punk rock musicians that Lovato was currently listening to, such as Royal & the Serpent and Turnstile.

On Instagram stories in April 2022, the singer confirmed her upcoming album to reflect on "the artist's ups and downs during her personal journey". Lovato further explained, "getting emotional listening to my new album because I'm so proud of it", as well as labeling it her "absolute best yet and so representative of me, where I started and who I am today". At this point, a lead single was just "weeks away" per Lovato's communication with fans. Lovato finally confirmed the lead single would be titled "Skin of My Teeth" on May 23, 2022, indirectly through a short tweet that was responding to fan speculation. A few days later, Lovato officially announced the song's release and shared the cover art for the single. Lovato announced the album with its cover art and release date on June 6, 2022, with a link to her official store where fans could order physical copies of the record.

A press release indicated that the album would include sixteen tracks and included a statement from Lovato, who shared:

"The process of making this album has been the most fulfilling yet, and I'm grateful to my fans and collaborators for being on this journey with me. Never have I been more sure of myself and my music, and this record speaks that for itself. To my Lovatics who have been rocking out with me since the beginning and those who are just now coming along for the ride, thank you. This record is for you."

== Composition ==
=== Music and lyrics ===
Holy Fvck is seen to be a sonic shift for Lovato, and has been described as a hard rock and pop punk album, featuring elements of heavy metal and various rock styles. Regarding her decision to revert to a rock-based sound, Lovato said "Back when I worked on Disney Channel, I knew I could go this hard, but it wasn't until recently that I felt like I could accomplish this sound." She further stated "I've had a lot of anger since coming out of treatment. These new songs are about taking the power back and owning my anger — something I pushed aside for years, because I thought it would make me less spiritual."

One lyrical theme of the album was of a religious undertone, which Lovato told British Vogue "just came out in the writing process. I wanted to take my power back. I grew up in the church as a Christian, and I had some anger towards it. Being queer, I definitely felt like I was misunderstood." Lovato also referred to Holy Fvck as her most authentic album to date, and that she felt proud of her previous work but "it didn't make me feel very happy. There was always this kind of emptiness that I felt, because I was trying to be someone that I wasn't. Now, I identify as non-binary, so when I say, 'Would you like me better if I was still her,' it's also a reference to people wanting me to stay who they wanted me to be in their eyes."

=== Songs ===
Holy Fvck's opening track "Freak", featuring British singer Yungblud, features "carnivalesque goth-rock guitars and bursts of industrial glam and hardcore, finds Lovato bewailing her status as a "piece of meat" carved up for entertainment" featuring the lyrics "came for the trauma, stayed for the drama". "Skin of My Teeth" was compared by NPR to the sound of "Celebrity Skin" by Hole with the vocal affectations of "Born This Way" by Lady Gaga; and was praised by Loudwire for tackling addiction, while describing it as having "an immediate sense of urgency, opening with two snare hits and some chord strumming" after which Lovato begins to sing in a sardonic vocal tone.

Third track and second single "Substance" was described by Emily Zemler of Rolling Stone as a "raucous", "anthemic pop-punk" song, featuring Lovato singing loudly over guitars and drums inspired by the earlier years of punk music. The lyrics present in the song are a direct criticism of contemporary society, as well as evoking Lovato's previous drug-related problems and mental health problems. "Eat Me", featuring Royal & the Serpent, is the album's fourth track, and was compared by Beaumont to "Muse's more grinding synth-rock" and "swivels the target from herself to the industry that shackled her to their lucrative expectations. "Be more predictable, be less political, not too original, keep the tradition but stay individual," she groans, listing A&R notes before kicking back on a power punk chorus: "I know the girl that you adored, she's dead, it's time to fucking mourn… you'll have to eat me as I am." USA Today further compared "Eat Me" to the music of Nine Inch Nails, which sees Lovato and Royal & the Serpent "tiptoe in on a creeping goth vibe before the song explodes into a fireball of anger".

The fifth track is the album's title track, with Callie Ahlgrim of Insider Inc. calling it "a solid, throaty head-banger", with lyrics of "biblical imagery" which "alludes to sex so good that it feels sacred". Sixth track "29" was described by James Hall of The Daily Telegraph as "a soaring slab of radio-friendly rock", and features lyrics referring to age gaps in relationships, with media speculation that Lovato's ex-boyfriend Wilmer Valderrama is the subject of the song, although Lovato did not directly confirm this. "Happy Ending" was described by Beaumont as "a rousing slab of grunge pop soul-searching" with Lovato confessing that "I miss my vices", "demons are calling and tearing me to shreds".

The eighth track "Heaven" is an "industrial goth-rock" song which features a "glam drumbeat" and was likened by Hall to "sound[ing] like a mash-up between the Sweet and Megadeth", In an interview with Los Angeles Times, Lovato states that the song's lyrics are "actually based on a Bible verse" further explaining "Matthew 5:30 says, 'If your right hand causes you to sin, cut it off; [for] it's better to lose one part of your body than your entire body to hell.' That was a Bible verse I heard since I was young — too young to know what masturbation was. And now, I have my own [line of] sex toys. Masturbation can be a form of self-care, it's not something to be ashamed of at all." "City of Angels" is Holy Fvck's ninth track, and was compared by Beaumont to the music of Avril Lavigne and Blink-182, with sexual innuendo-based lyrics featuring "Lovato imagin[ing] "christening" a wide array of Los Angeles landmarks from the Viper Room to Splash Mountain". Tenth track "Bones" was said by Hannah Mylrea of NME to be "a mosh-pit inducing mating call" which incorporates "throbbing Royal Blood riffs and Lovato's purred chorus that begins with the no-nonsense declaration "Let me jump your bones"".

"Come Together", the album's twelfth track, is a pop rock song which "excellently blends the singer's two most prominent sounds into an explosion of euphoric expression. A masterclass in using production to your advantage, the song leans back when it needs to in order to let a blast of joyful noise wash over you on the infectious chorus." "Dead Friends", the thirteenth track, is a "banging pop punk jam session, filled with fast guitars and plenty of double-time drum patterns"; and was said by Lovato in an interview with British Vogue to have originally been "a slower song, but I ended up turning it into a faster one. I wanted to pay homage to the friends that I missed, while keeping it upbeat and a feel-good homage to them." The fifteenth track "Feed" "starts as a piano ballad, cataloging "scars I've caused and scars I've earned," before it bursts into a raw celebration of self-actualization and determination. "I decide which one to feed" becomes a simple yet persuasive mantra in the midst of chaos." "4 Ever 4 Me" is Holy Fvck's sixteenth and final track, a love song which was likened by Olivia Horn of Pitchfork to the music of the Goo Goo Dolls, which "wraps Lovato in acoustic chords and bittersweet strings as they sing to a new partner about wanting to meet his mother".

== Promotion ==
The album announcement was supported by the release of an album trailer on June 6, 2022, with a snippet of "Skin of My Teeth" serving as the background music to a series of clips of Lovato creating the album in the studio. The trailer ends with a snippet of "Freak", with the lyrics "Get your tickets to the freak show baby, step right up to watch the freak go crazy". Lovato premiered "Skin of My Teeth" on June 9 with a performance on The Tonight Show Starring Jimmy Fallon. During her interview on the show, Lovato revealed that Holy Fvck contains three collaborations. A second single, "Substance", was released on July 15, 2022. Lovato premiered the song on Jimmy Kimmel Live! on July 14 and announced the track listing for the album that day. According to Billboard, the song "29" would be released as the album's third single. Upon posting a snippet on TikTok, fans speculated that the lyrics are a reference to ex-boyfriend Wilmer Valderrama. The song was officially released on August 17, 2022. Internationally, three alternative versions of the album were made available from Lovato's online store; each new version features the same track listing but an alternative cover-art for the album.

=== Tour ===
On June 7, 2022, Lovato officially announced her seventh concert tour, the Holy Fvck Tour, to promote the album. The 34-date tour began on August 13 in Springfield, Illinois, and concluded on November 10 in Rosemont, Illinois. American hard rock band Dead Sara and American singer-songwriter Royal & the Serpent were opening acts for the last leg of the tour.

== Controversy ==
In the UK, a poster promoting the tour and album was banned by the Advertising Standards Agency (ASA). The 2023 ruling stated that the use of imagery which depicted Lovato in a bondage outfit on a crucifix-shaped mattress evoked Christian religious imagery, according to the report Lovato was "in a position with her legs bound to one side which was reminiscent of Christ on the cross" and was likely to cause offence to Christians along with the title of the album Holy Fvck. The latter was said to be easily interpreted by most adults as a swear word, and the poster was also used in areas that were easily accessed by children. The ASA ruled that the poster could not be used again in that format, "unless it was suitably targeted".

== Critical reception ==
Professional ratings
Aggregate scores
Source	Rating
AnyDecentMusic?	7.4/10
Metacritic	78/100
Review scores
Source	Rating
AllMusic	4.5/5 stars
The Arts Desk	4/5 stars
Clash	7/10
The Daily Telegraph	3/5 stars
The Independent	4/5 stars
The Line of Best Fit	8/10
NME	3/5 stars
Pitchfork	6.5/10
Sputnikmusic	4/5 stars

Holy Fvck received praise from music critics. Lovato's return to her rock roots and raw, dominant energy was complimented, however some critics were ambivalent towards the 16-track runtime and heavy content. At Metacritic, which assigns a normalized rating out of 100 to reviews from publications, the album received a weighted average score of 78, based on 12 reviews, indicating "generally favorable reviews".

Writing for The Independent, Mark Beaumont reviewed the album positively, describing Holy Fvck as "a horny, hard-rock rebirth album" and as "a classic shedding-the-pop-facade record, bristling with defiance and real-me rebirth". George Griffiths of Official Charts Company called it "a dark and dangerous collection of high-throttle pop-punk stompers which contain some really genuine, heartbreaking lyrical revelations." Clash's review of the album by Emily Swingle remarked that "riling with a dark punk-rock attitude, this is an album that thrives in its heaviness, searing with venom and gloriously bold. Truly proving Lovato as a multi-faceted force to be reckoned with, [Holy Fvck] is a howl of brilliance." Insider Inc.'s Callie Ahlgrim added the album and its songs to the list of the biggest snubs of the 2023 Grammys nominations.

In a review from Pitchfork, Olivia Horn awarded the album a 6.5 out of 10 rating and wrote that it is "genuinely exciting to see Lovato enter chaos mode on Holy Fvck, opting to break shit rather than publicly mend herself" and "within the anger, there's plenty of room for humor and irreverence", complimenting "Substance", "29" and Lovato's vocals. Horn also noted that "at times Lovato pushes the irreverence to the extreme", referencing the album's artwork and some of the songs' sexual lyrics, and that "by the album's midpoint, you start to wish for just a little more subtlety". Giving Holy Fvck three stars out of five, NME contributor Hannah Mylrea was also mixed. Mylrea praised "Substance" and the "saucy" "City of Angels" as "cantering pop-punk moments", and Lovato's "powerhouse vocals" which "shine throughout, dripping with emotion and demonstrating impressive gymnastics" and was critical of the "slower, saccharine cuts such as 'Happy Ending', '4 Ever 4 Me' and 'Wasted'" and the length of the album's track list.

=== Year-end lists ===
Year-end rankings of Holy Fvck
Publication	List	Rank	Ref.
AllMusic	Favorite Pop Albums of 2022	Unranked	
Alternative Press	The Best Albums of 2022	Unranked	
Billboard	The 20 Best Pride Albums of 2022	Unranked	
Billboard	The 50 Best Albums of 2022	39	
PopMatters	The 80 Best Albums of 2022	71	
Riff Magazine	The 67 Best Albums of 2022	23	
Rolling Stone	Brittany Spanos's Top 10 Albums of 2022	10	

=== Accolades ===
Awards and nominations for Holy Fvck
Award	Year	Category	Result	Ref.
GLAAD Media Awards	2023	Outstanding Music Artist	Nominated	

== Commercial performance ==
Holy Fvck debuted at number seven on the US Billboard 200, including number 1 on the Top Alternative Albums and Top Rock Albums charts, marking both Lovato's first entry onto these charts with 33,000 album-equivalent units (of which 20,000 were pure album sales), marking Lovato's eighth consecutive top-ten album in the country. On the UK Albums Chart, the album also opened at number seven, with 6,488 units sold in the first week.

== Track listing ==
All songs were written by Demi Lovato, Warren "Oak" Felder, Alex Niceforo, and Keith "Ten4" Sorrells; produced by Felder; and co-produced by Niceforo and Sorrells. Additional writers and producers are given below.

Holy Fvck track listing
No.	Title	Writer(s)	Producer(s)	Length
1.	"Freak" (featuring Yungblud)	Laura Veltz; Michael Pollack; Dominic Harrison	Chris Greatti^{[a]}	2:36
2.	"Skin of My Teeth"	Veltz; Aaron Puckett		2:42
3.	"Substance"	Veltz; Jordan Lutes		2:40
4.	"Eat Me" (featuring Royal & the Serpent)	Veltz; Ryan Santiago		3:00
5.	"Holy Fvck"	Veltz; Salem Ilese Davern		2:34
6.	"29"	Veltz; Sean Douglas		2:43
7.	"Happy Ending"	Veltz; Lutes; Mitch Allan	Allan	3:49
8.	"Heaven"	Veltz; Puckett		2:27
9.	"City of Angels"	Allan; Lutes; Davern	Allan	2:51
10.	"Bones"	Emily Armstrong; Siouxsie Medley; Sean Friday		2:31
11.	"Wasted"	Veltz; Douglas		3:03
12.	"Come Together"	Veltz; Douglas		3:33
13.	"Dead Friends"	Veltz; Sam Ellis		2:57
14.	"Help Me" (with Dead Sara)	Armstrong; Medley; Friday		3:23
15.	"Feed"	Veltz; Daniel Tashian; JT Daly		3:13
16.	"4 Ever 4 Me"	Veltz; Allan; Susan Joyce	Allan	3:43
Total length:				47:48

Notes

- ^{^[a]} denotes vocal producer

== Personnel ==
Credits are obtained from Lovato's official website.

Performers and musicians

- Demi Lovato – vocals, background vocals (track 9)
- Oak – background vocals (1–2, 4–9, 11–13, 15), programming, keyboards, drums (5–7, 9–15)
- Keith "Ten4" Sorrells – background vocals (1–2, 4–9, 11–13, 15), programming, guitar (1–6, 8–16), bass, drums (1–15)
- Alex Niceforo – background vocals (1–2, 5–9, 11–13, 15), guitar (1–3, 5–6, 8–16), drums (1), programming (5–16)
- Laura Veltz – background vocals (1–2, 4–8, 11–13, 15)
- Michael Pollack – background vocals (1)
- Lil Aaron – background vocals (2, 8)
- Salem Ilese – background vocals (5)
- Sean Douglas – background vocals (6, 11–12)
- Mitch Allan – background vocals (7, 9), additional programming (7, 16), guitar (7, 9, 16)
- Jutes – background vocals (9)
- Sam Ellis – background vocals (13)
- JT Daly – background vocals (15)
- Caleb Hulin – guitar (7)
- Davide Rossi – violin (16), viola (16), cello (16)
- Yungblud – featured artist (1)
- Royal & the Serpent – featured artist (4)
- Dead Sara – featured artists (11)

Production

- Adam Hawkins – mixing (1, 5, 11–12)
- Manny Marroquin – mixing (2–3, 6)
- Neal Avron – mixing (4, 7)
- Keith "Ten4" Sorrells – mixing (8–10, 13–16)
- Chris Galland – mix engineering (3)
- Chris Gehringer – mastering
- Caleb Hulin – additional vocal engineering (7)
- Oak – recording
- Oscar Linnander – recording engineering (1), production assistance, recording (2–16)
- Zach Pereyra – mixing assistance (2–3, 6)
- Trey Station – mixing assistance (2, 6)
- Anthony Vilchis – mixing assistance (2–3, 6)

Design and marketing

- Brandon Bowen – photography, artwork
- Collin Fletcher – art direction, design
- Nagina Lane – digital marketing
- Paul Lane – package production
- MacAndrew Martin – art direction, design
- Erica Paul – digital marketing
- Tavo Roig – digital marketing
- Dominique Taverna – digital marketing
- Sharon Timure – marketing
- Nick Vernet – creative direction

== Charts ==
=== Weekly charts ===
Weekly chart performance for Holy Fvck
Chart (2022)	Peak position
Australian Albums (ARIA)	47
Austrian Albums (Ö3 Austria)	74
Belgian Albums (Ultratop Flanders)	14
Belgian Albums (Ultratop Wallonia)	52
Canadian Albums (Billboard)	45
Dutch Albums (Album Top 100)	45
French Albums (SNEP)	87
German Albums (Offizielle Top 100)	26
Irish Albums (IRMA)	89
New Zealand Albums (RMNZ)	36
Portuguese Albums (AFP)	6
Scottish Albums (Official Charts)	6
Spanish Albums (Promusicae)	19
Swiss Albums (Schweizer Hitparade)	41
UK Albums (Official Charts)	7
US Billboard 200	7
US Top Alternative Albums (Billboard)	1
US Top Rock Albums (Billboard)	1

=== Year-end chart ===
Year-end chart performance for Holy Fvck
Chart (2022)	Position
US Top Alternative Albums (Billboard)	49

== Release history ==
Release dates and formats for Holy Fvck
Region	Date	Format	Label	Ref.
Various	August 19, 2022	CD; digital download; streaming; vinyl	Island	
Various	September 30, 2022	Cassette	Island	
