= List of songs recorded by Demi Lovato =

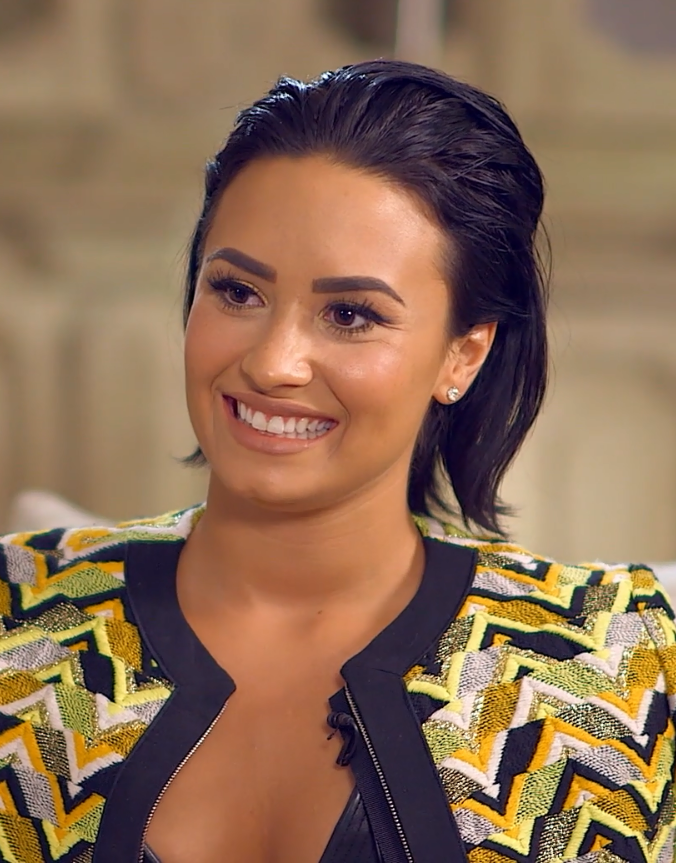
Lovato in October 2015

American singer Demi Lovato has recorded materials for eight studio albums. Prior to launching her music career, Lovato starred in the Disney Channel musical television film Camp Rock, as well as the film's follow-up Camp Rock 2: The Final Jam.

Once signed with Hollywood Records, Lovato released her debut pop rock single, "Get Back" from her debut studio album, Don't Forget which was released on September 23, 2008. "La La Land" was released as well. Her second studio album, Here We Go Again was released on July 21, 2009. The lead single of the same title was released on June 23, 2009 and the second single, "Remember December" was released on January 18, 2010. She released her third album, Unbroken in September 2011. The album's lead single, "Skyscraper" was released on July 12, 2011. The following single, "Give Your Heart a Break" was released on January 23, 2012. Her fourth album, Demi was released on May 14, 2013. The lead-single of the album, "Heart Attack" was released on February 25, 2013. The album features the singles "Made in the USA", "Neon Lights" and "Really Don't Care".

On July 1, 2015, Lovato released her lead-single from her fifth album, called "Cool for the Summer". Lovato's fifth album, Confident was released on October 16, 2015 and the title track "Confident" was released as a single on September 18, 2015. "Stone Cold", which was released as the album's third and final single, peaked at number 2 on the US Bubbling Under Hot 100 Singles chart. She released a buzz single titled "Body Say" in early July 2016. In 2017, Lovato was featured in Cheat Codes' "No Promises", Jax Jones' "Instruction" along with Stefflon Don, also Luis Fonsi's "Échame la Culpa". On July 11, 2017, she released the lead single of her sixth studio album, "Sorry Not Sorry". Lovato's sixth album, Tell Me You Love Me was released on September 29, 2017. In 2018, Lovato released her collaborations with Christina Aguilera and Clean Bandit, titled "Fall in Line" and "Solo", respectively. On June 21, 2018, Lovato released a stand-alone single "Sober", which she referred to as "my truth" and discusses struggles with addiction and sobriety.

In 2020, Lovato made her comeback in the music industry by performing single "Anyone" at the 62nd Annual Grammy Awards. Lovato released singles "I Love Me", "Still Have Me" and "Commander in Chief" in March, September and October, respectively. She also was featured in Sam Smith's collaborative single "I'm Ready", a remix of JoJo's "Lonely Hearts", and Marshmello's "OK Not to Be OK". Lovato released her seventh studio album, Dancing with the Devil... the Art of Starting Over on April 2, 2021, including singles "What Other People Say" with Sam Fischer and "Dancing with the Devil". Lovato released her eighth studio album, Holy Fvck on August 19, 2022. In September 2023, Lovato released re-recorded rock versions of previous tracks on her first remix album, Revamped. She released her ninth studio album, It's Not That Deep in October 2025.

== Songs ==
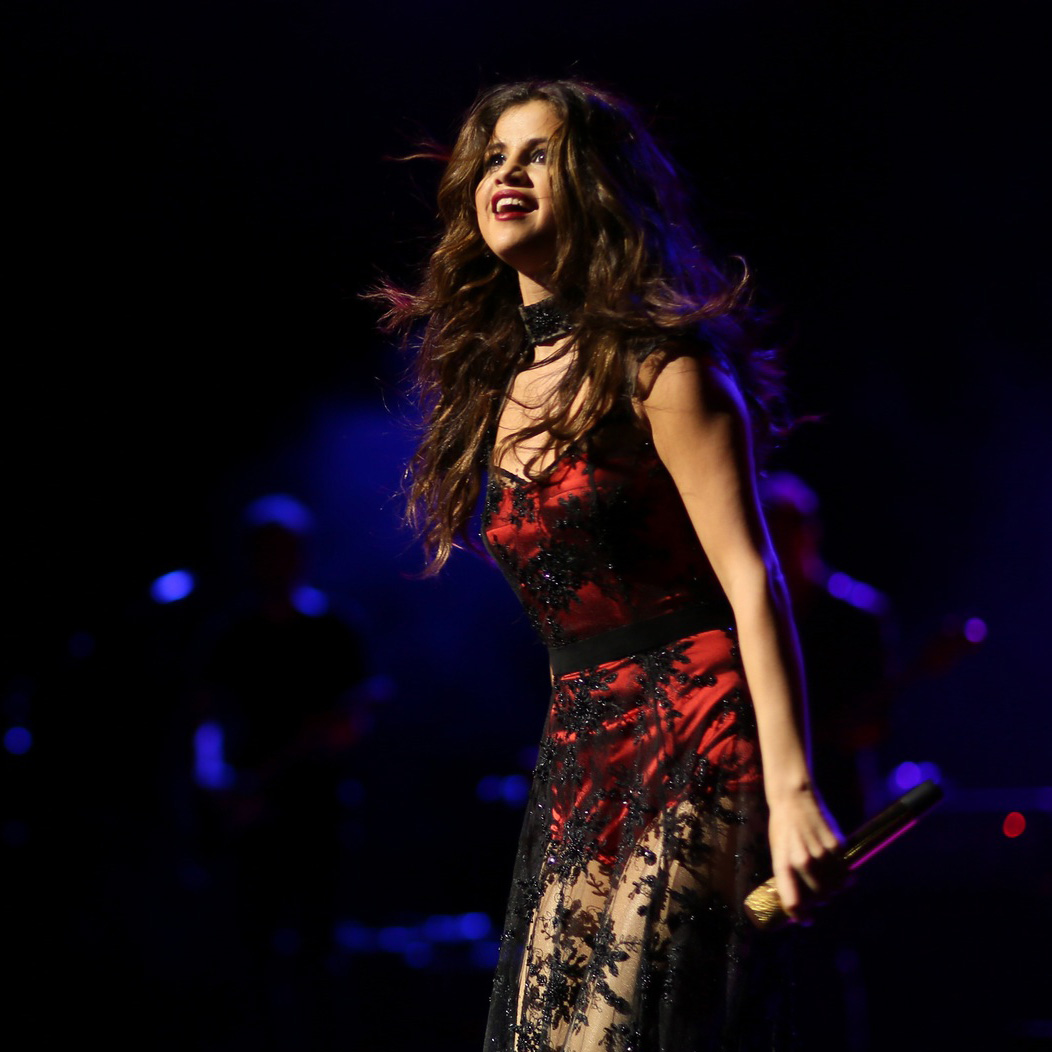
Selena Gomez (pictured) collaborated with Lovato on "One and the Same" and "Send It On".

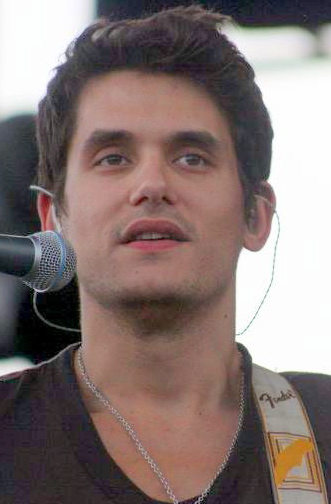
American musician John Mayer (pictured) co-wrote "World of Chances" on Lovato's sophomore album, Here We Go Again.

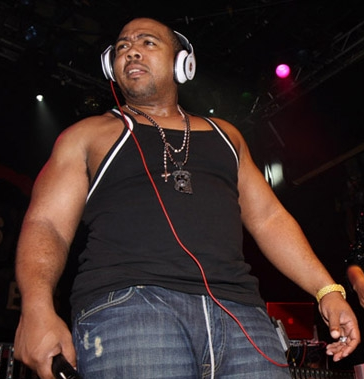
American record producer Timbaland (pictured) has written three songs for Lovato, "All Night Long", "Lightweight" and "Together" from Lovato's third studio album, Unbroken.

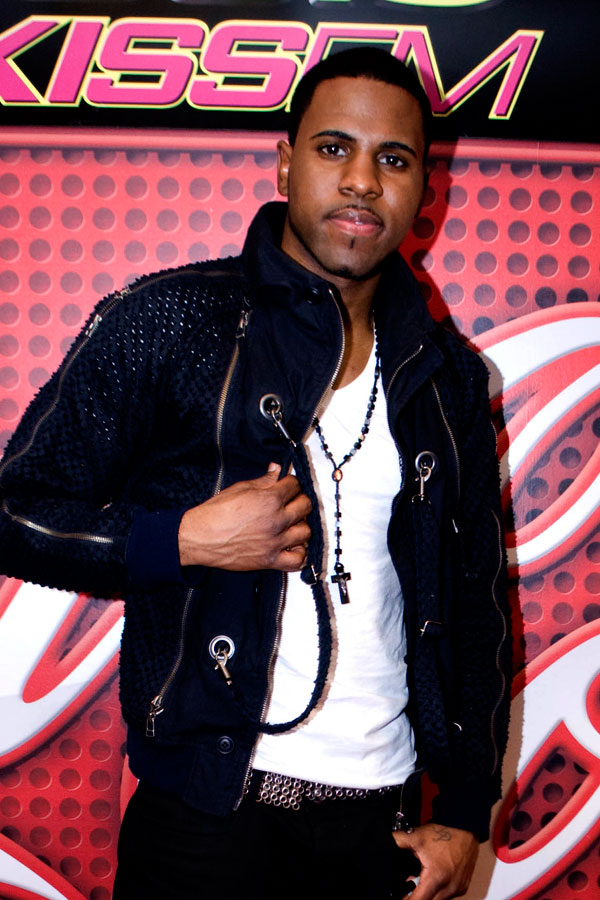
Jason Derulo (pictured) collaborated with Lovato on "Together" from Lovato's third studio album, Unbroken.

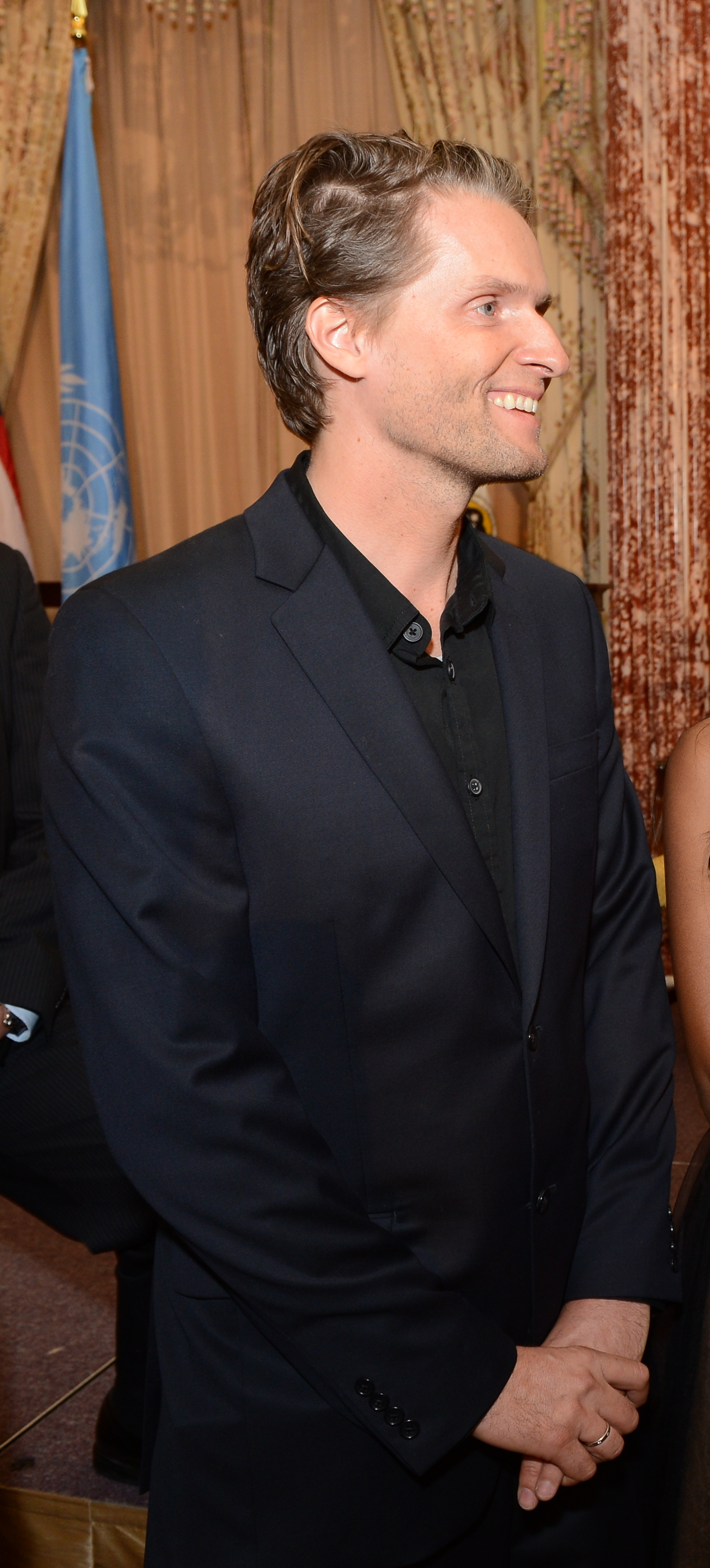
Record producer Toby Gad (pictured) has written four songs for Lovato, including "Skyscraper".

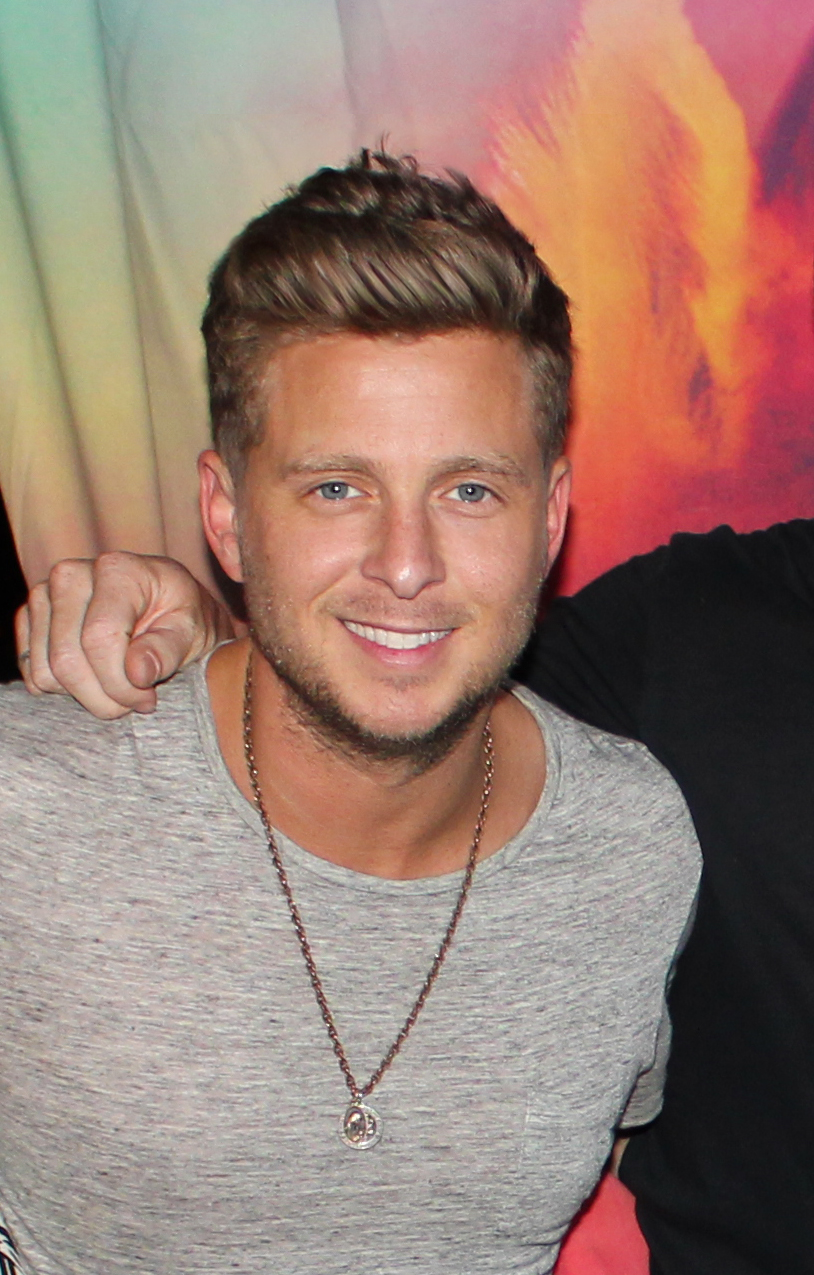
OneRepublic frontman Ryan Tedder (pictured) has written three songs for Lovato, "Neon Lights", "Who's That Boy?" and "Wildfire".

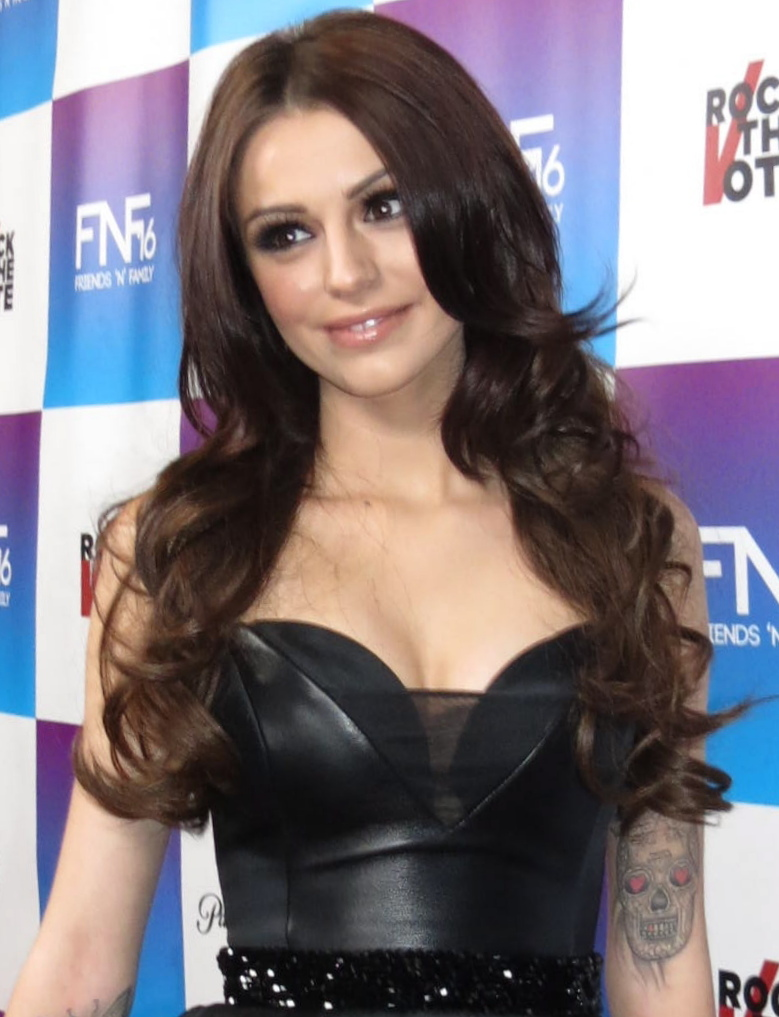
British rapper Cher Lloyd (pictured) co-wrote "Really Don't Care" and appears as the only featured artist on Demi.

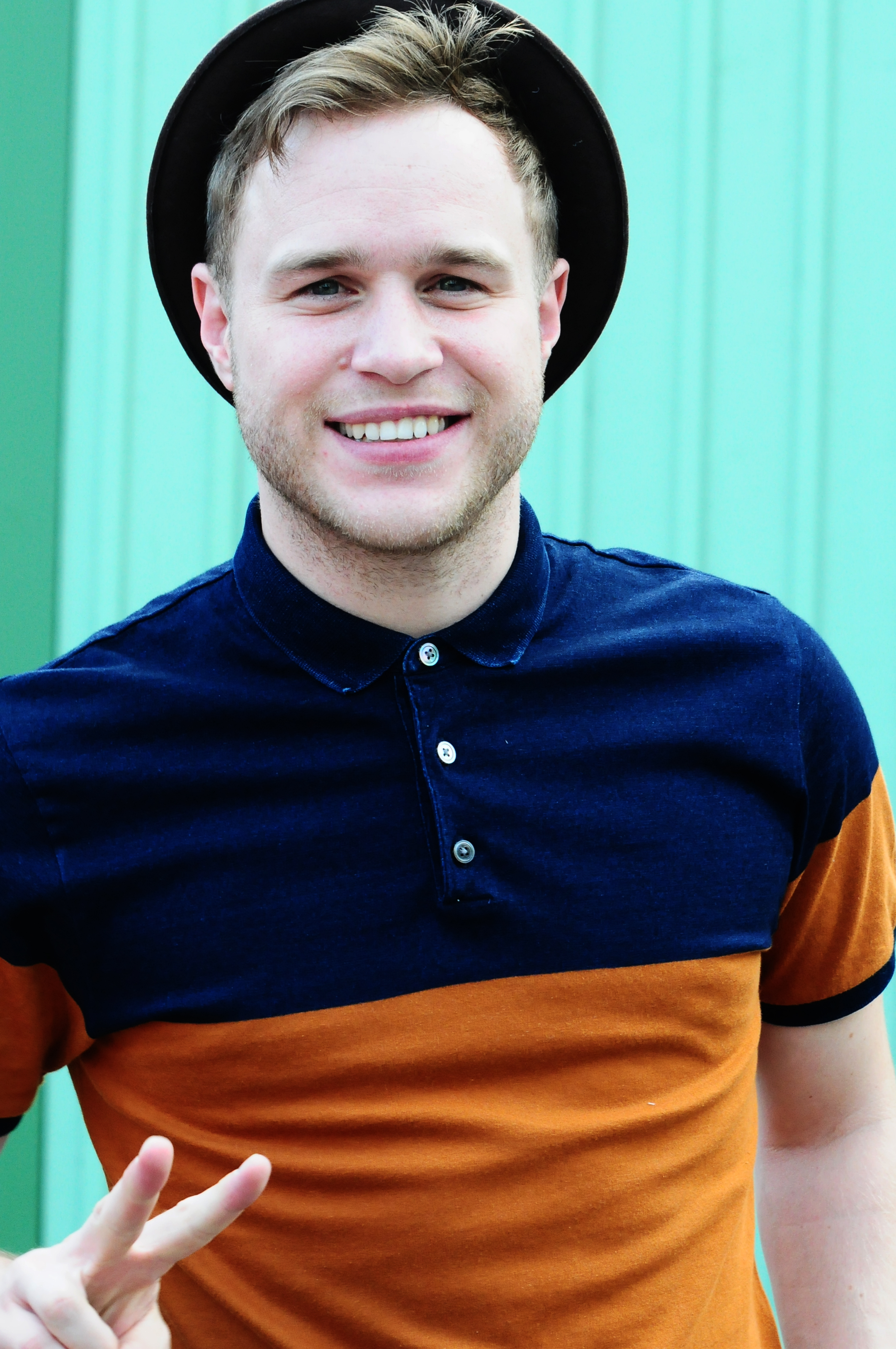
British singer Olly Murs (pictured) collaborated with Lovato on "Up" from his fourth album, Never Been Better.

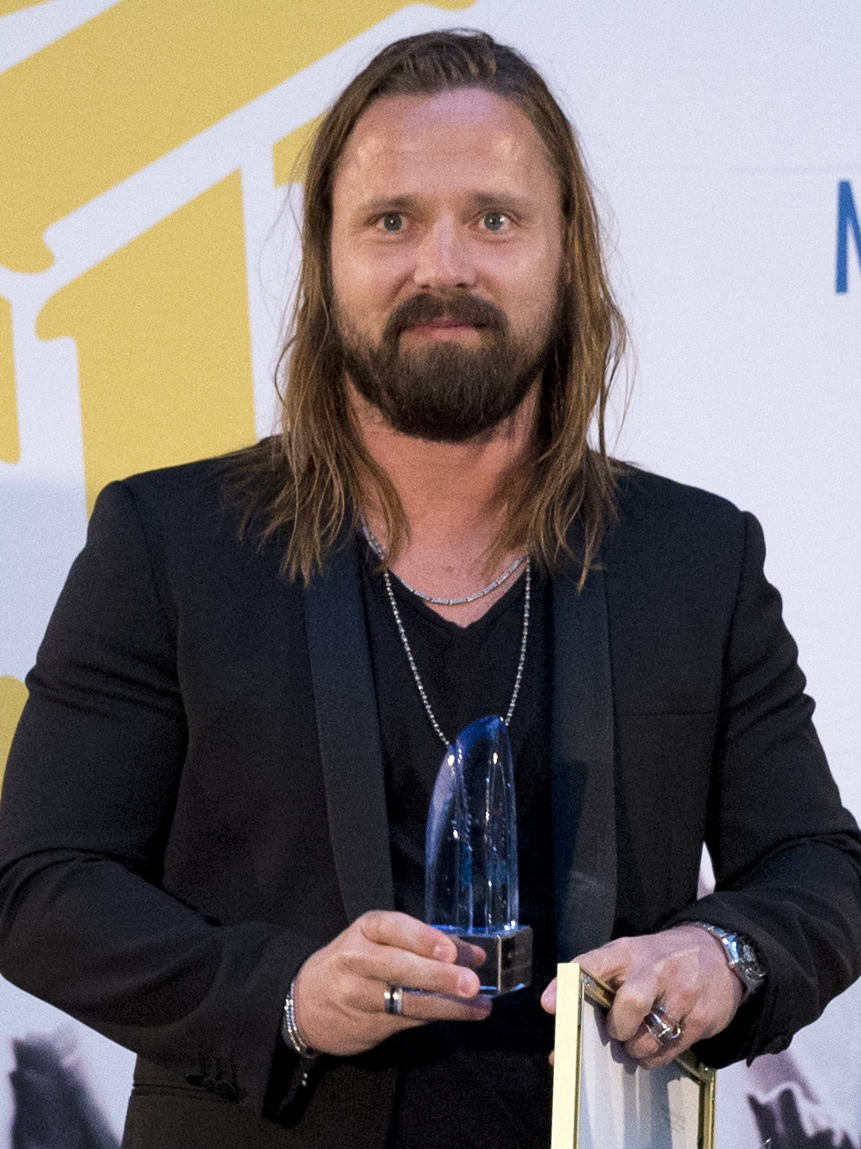
Grammy-winning producer and songwriter, Max Martin (pictured) co-wrote and co-produced "Cool for the Summer" and "Confident" from Lovato's fifth album, Confident.

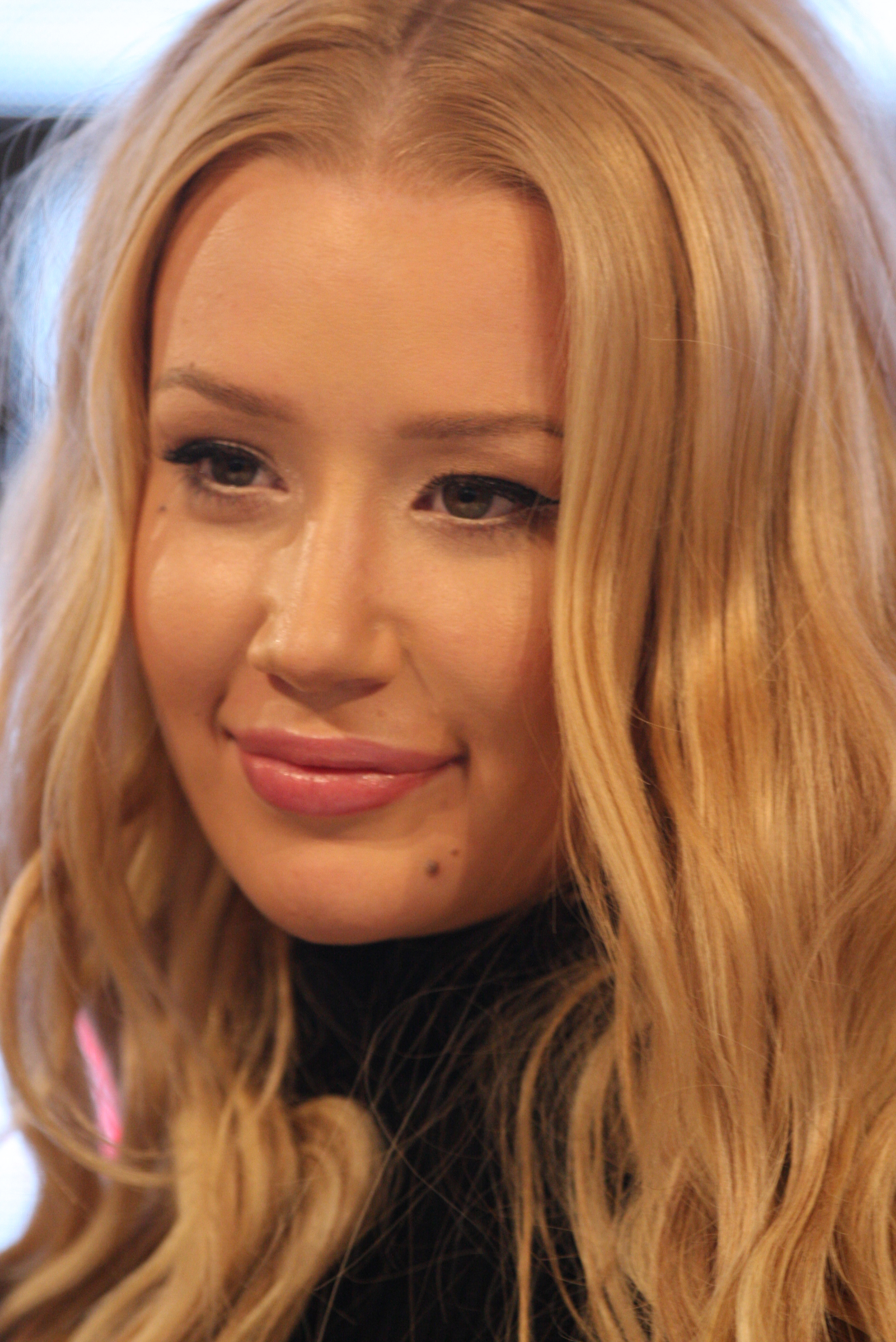
Australian rapper Iggy Azalea (pictured) collaborated with Lovato on "Kingdom Come" from Lovato's fifth album, Confident.

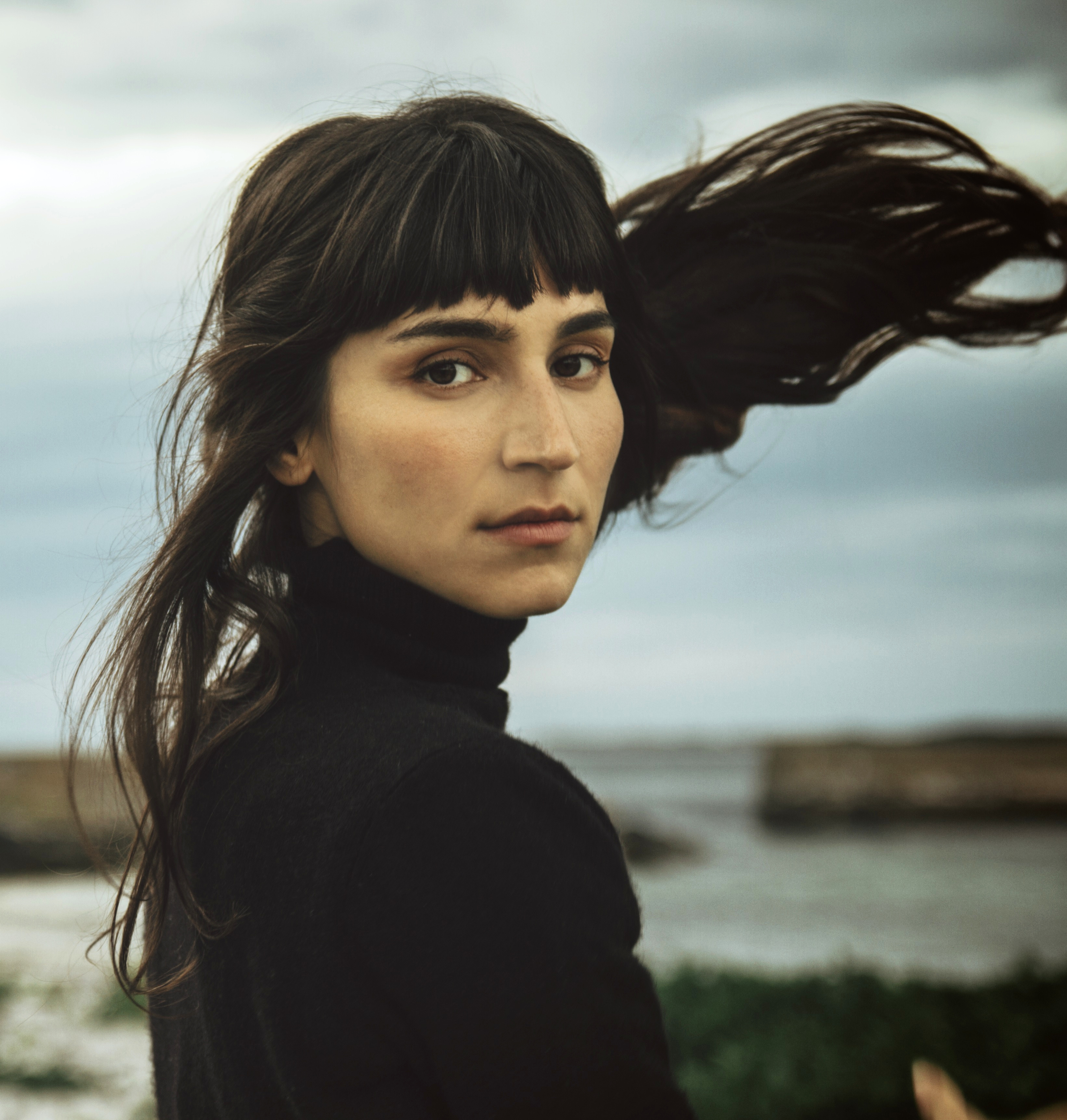
Swedish musician Laleh (pictured) co-wrote "Stone Cold", "Father" and "Yes" from Lovato's fifth album, Confident.

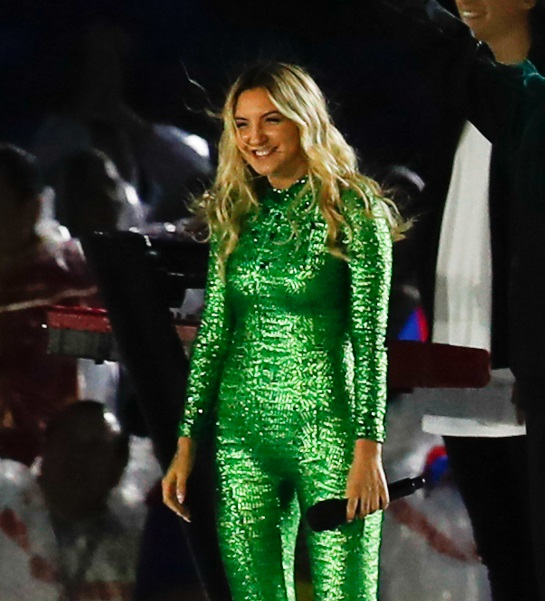
American singer Julia Michaels (pictured) has penned eight songs for Lovato, including "Waitin for You" and "Commander in Chief".

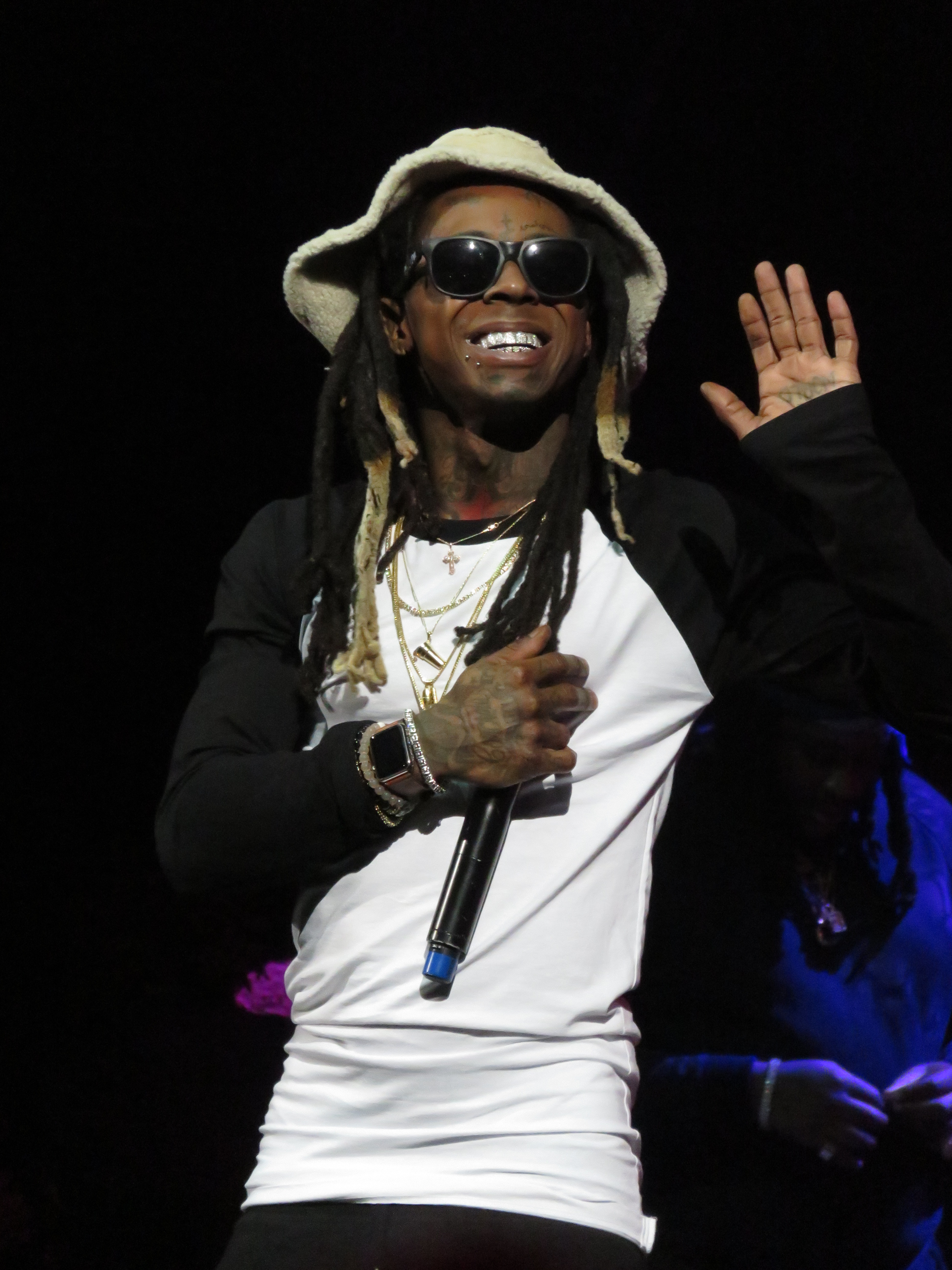
American rapper Lil Wayne (pictured) collaborated with Lovato on "Lonely" and appeared as the only featured artist on Tell Me You Love Me.

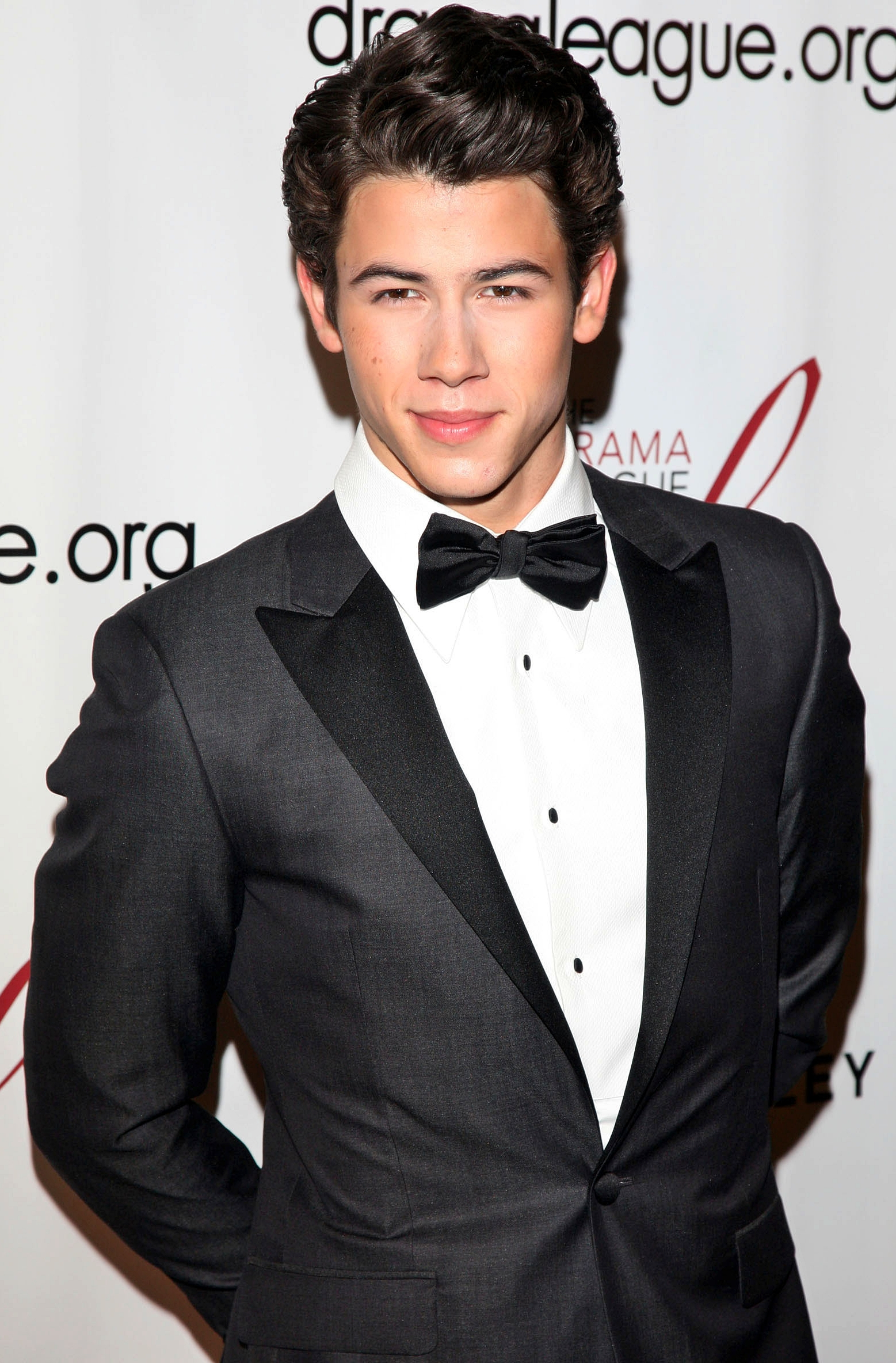
Apart from his work with Jonas Brothers, Nick Jonas (pictured) has featured Lovato on "Avalanche" from his self-titled album and co-wrote "Ready for Ya" from Tell Me You Love Me.

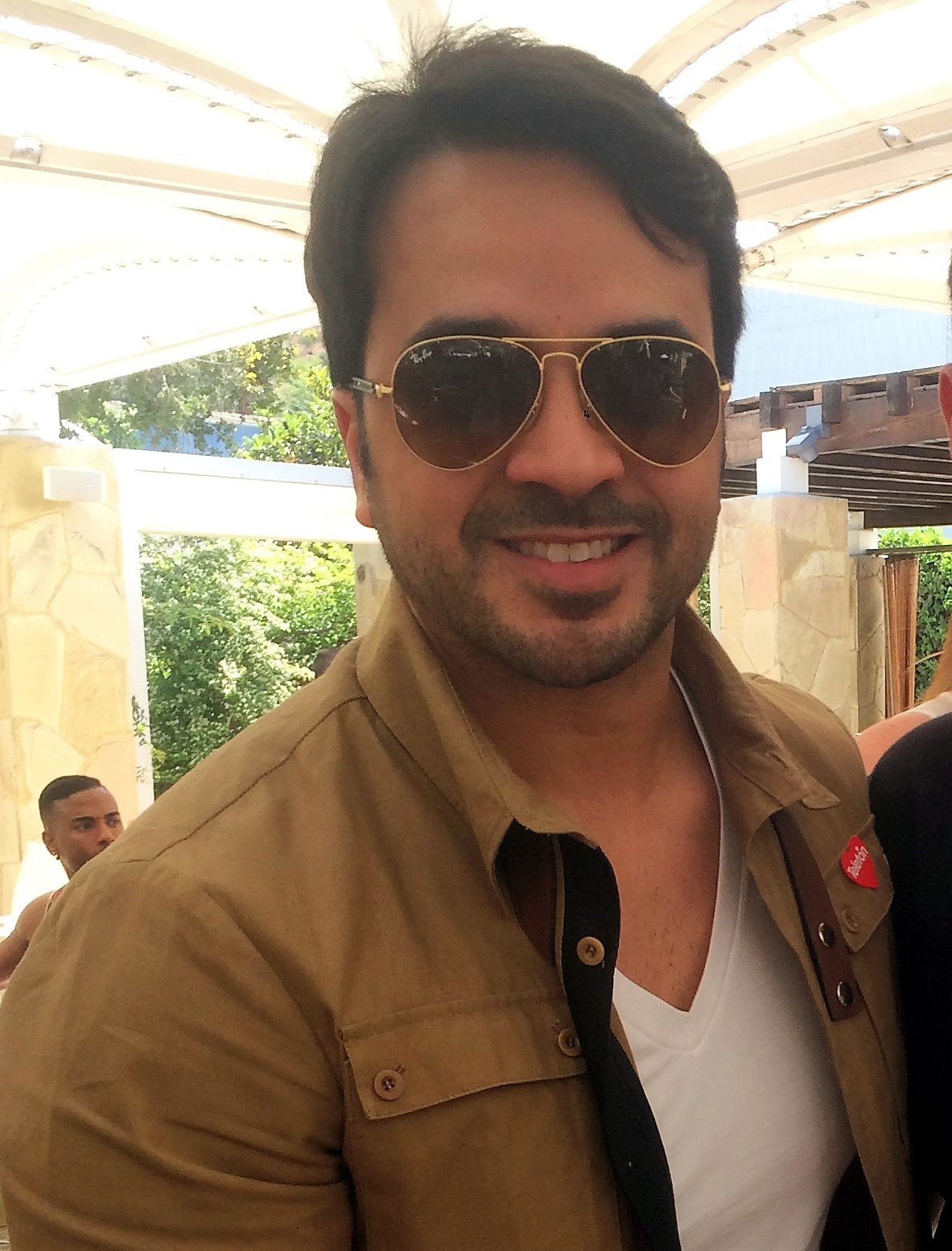
Puerto Rican singer Luis Fonsi (pictured) featured Lovato on "Échame la Culpa" from his tenth studio album, Vida.

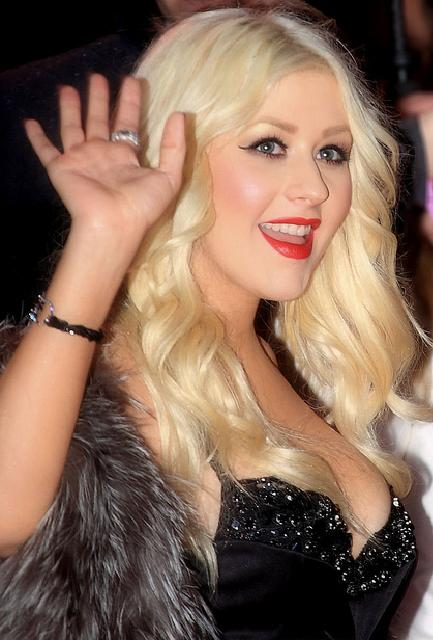
American singer Christina Aguilera (pictured) has featured Lovato on "Fall in Line" from her eighth studio album, Liberation.

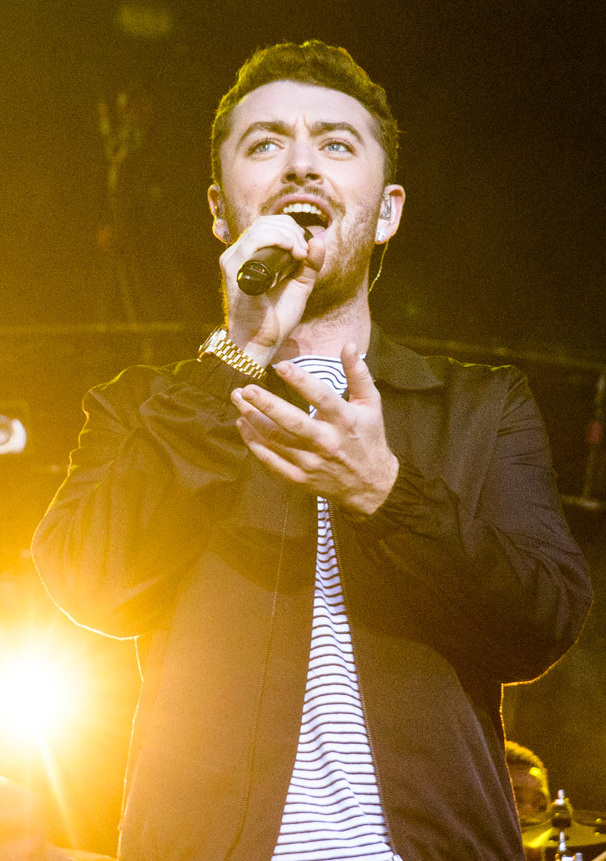
Lovato collaborated with Sam Smith (pictured) on the song "I'm Ready" from their third studio album, Love Goes.

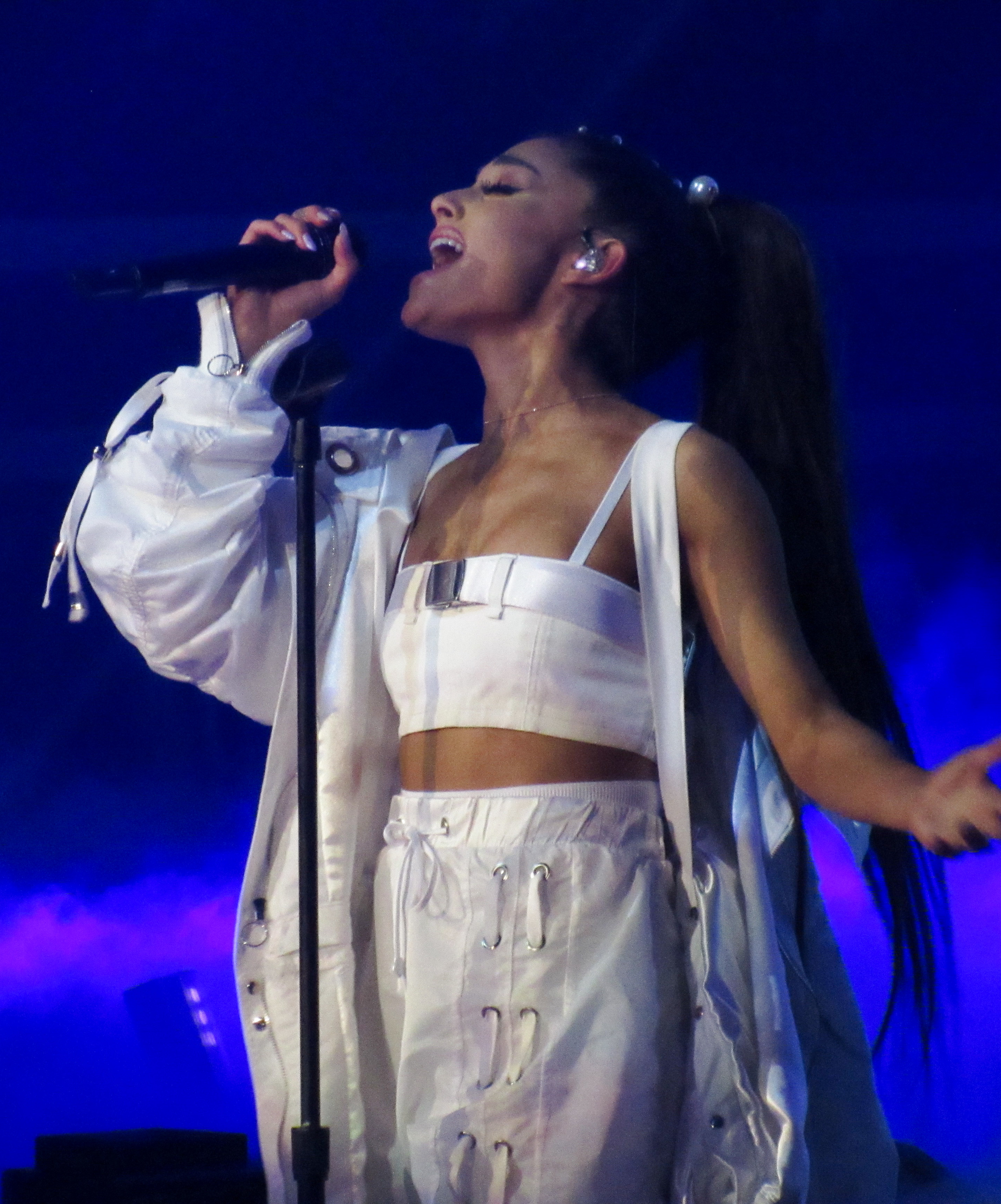
Ariana Grande (pictured) wrote for and collaborated with Lovato on "Met Him Last Night" for Dancing with the Devil... the Art of Starting Over.

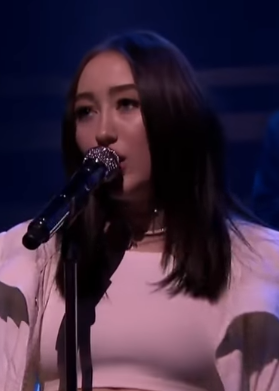
Noah Cyrus (pictured) also collaborated with Lovato on the song "Easy" for Demi's seventh studio album, Dancing with the Devil... the Art of Starting Over.

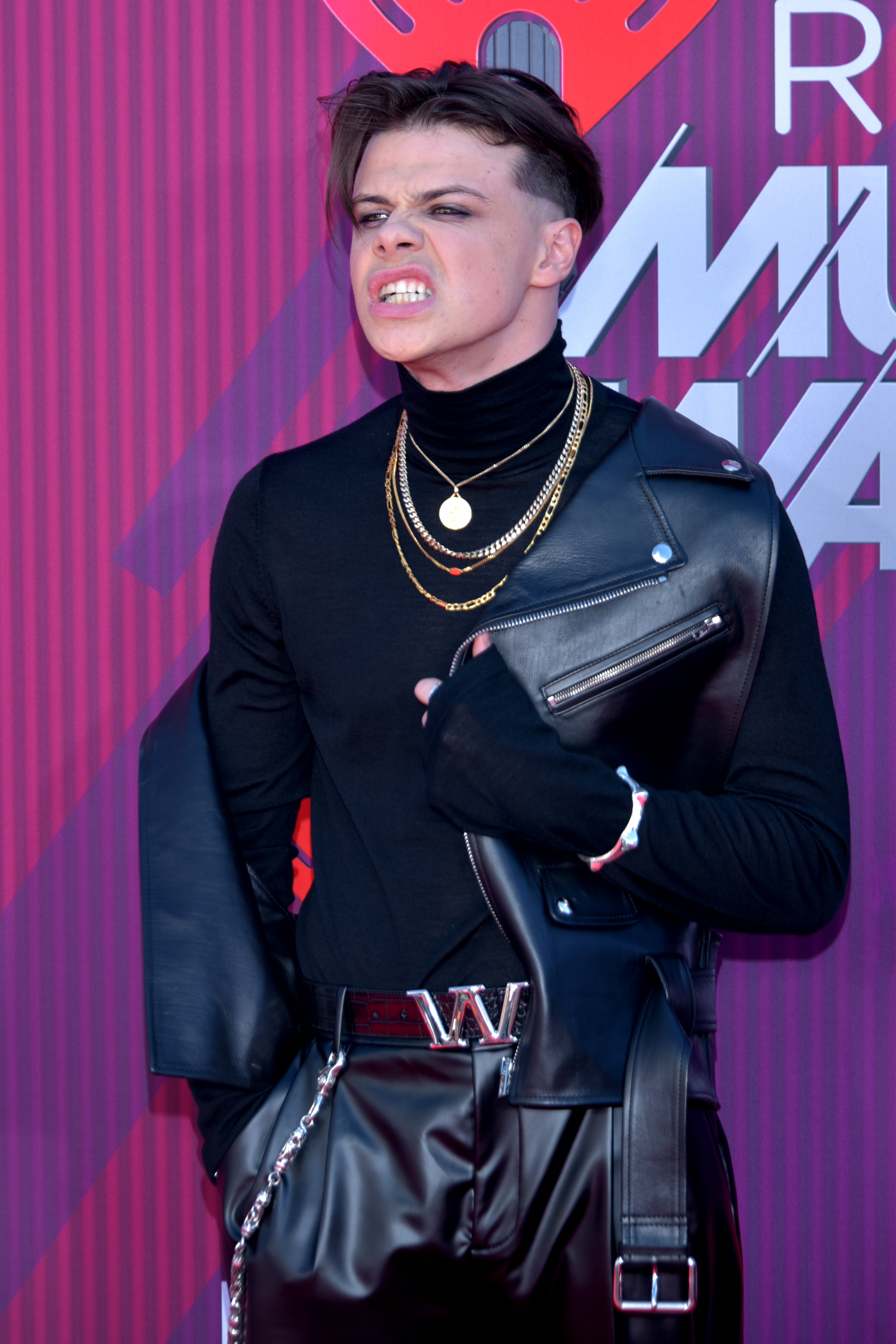
Musician Yungblud (pictured) collaborated with Lovato on "Freak" and appeared as one of three collaborators on Lovato's eighth studio album Holy Fvck.

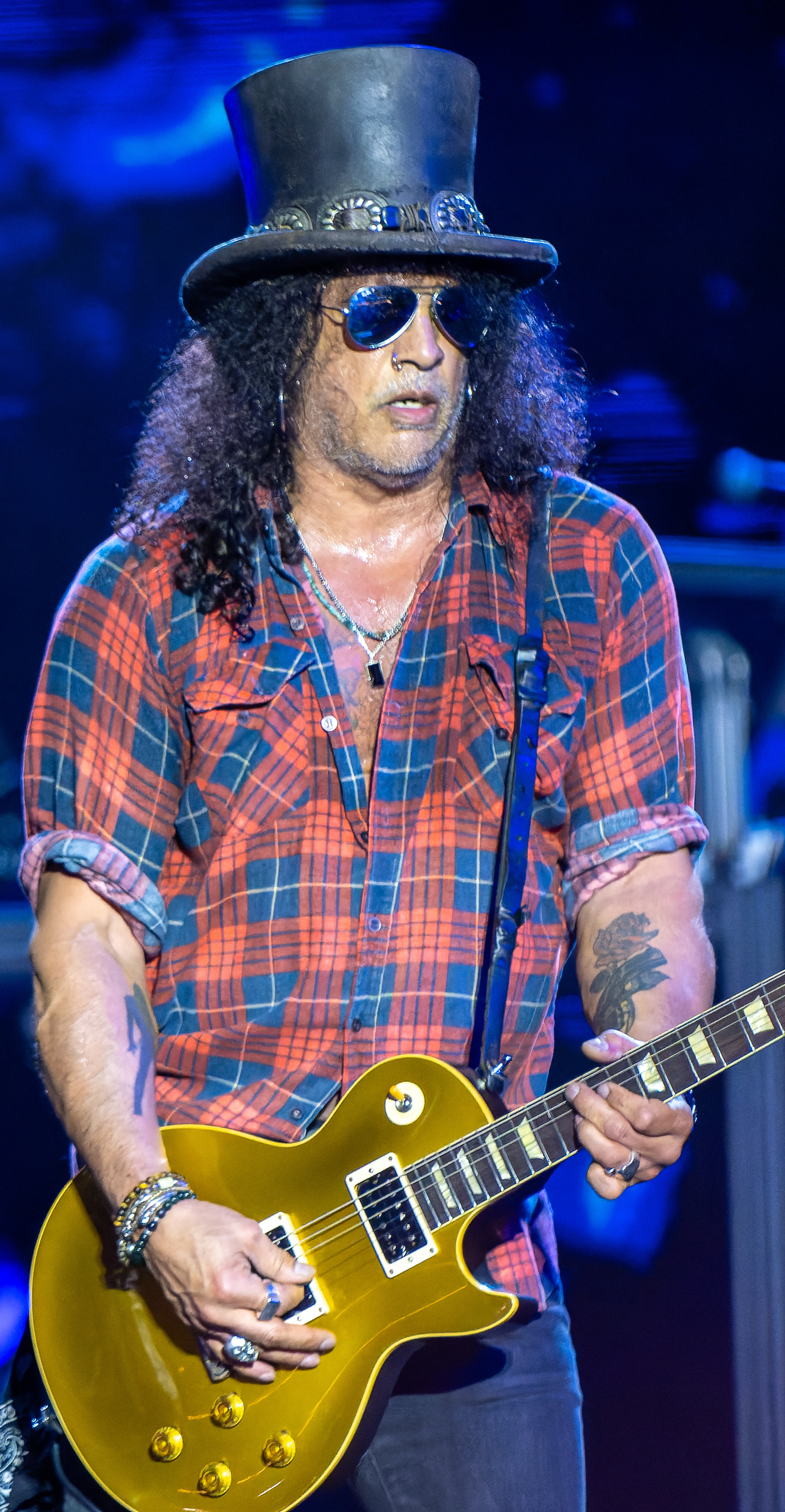
Guitarist Slash (pictured) collaborated with Lovato on the re-recording version of "Sorry Not Sorry" for her remix album Revamped and a cover of "Papa Was a Rollin' Stone" from his album Orgy of the Damned.

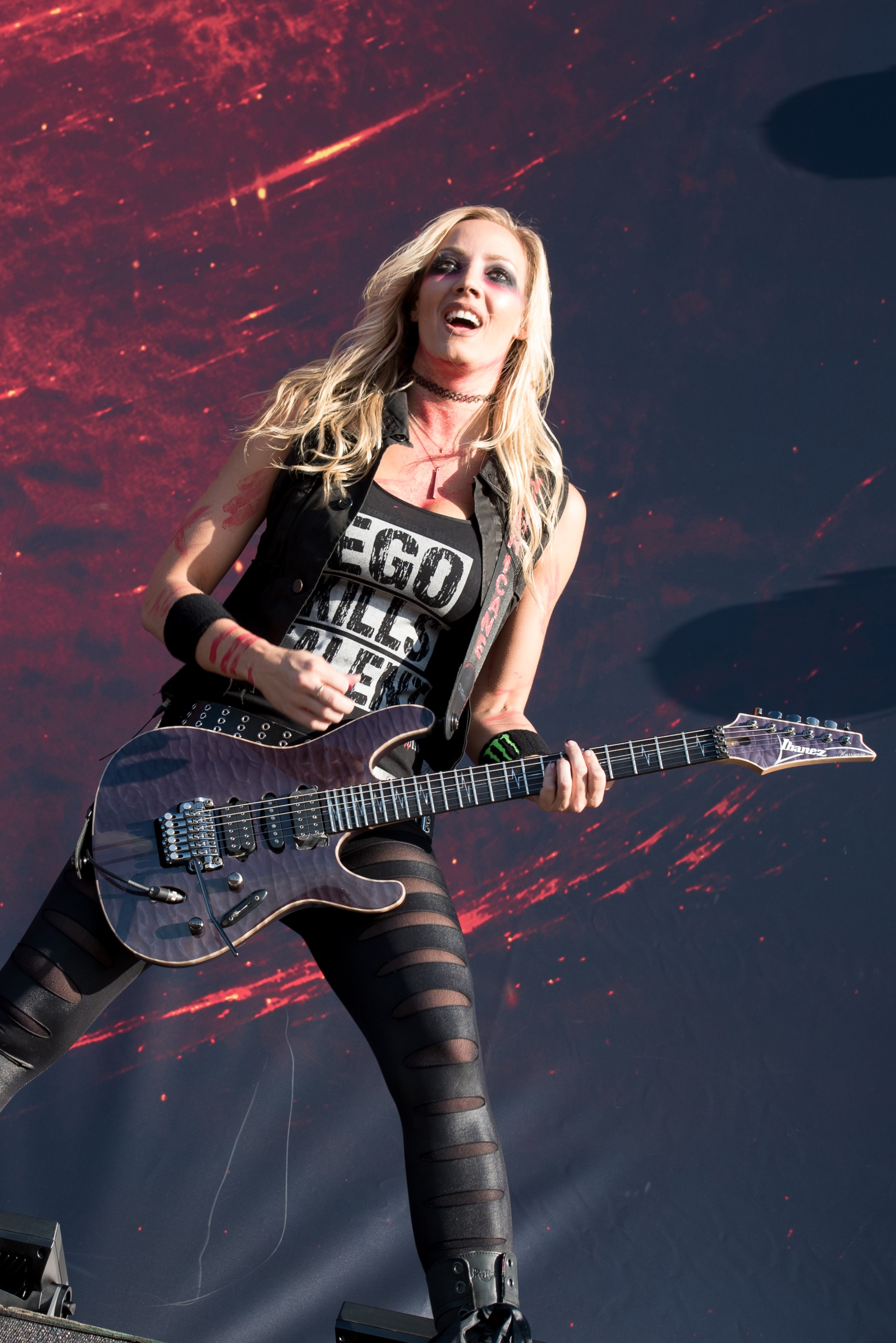
Guitarist Nita Strauss (pictured) collaborated with Lovato on the re-recording version of "La La Land" for her remix album Revamped.

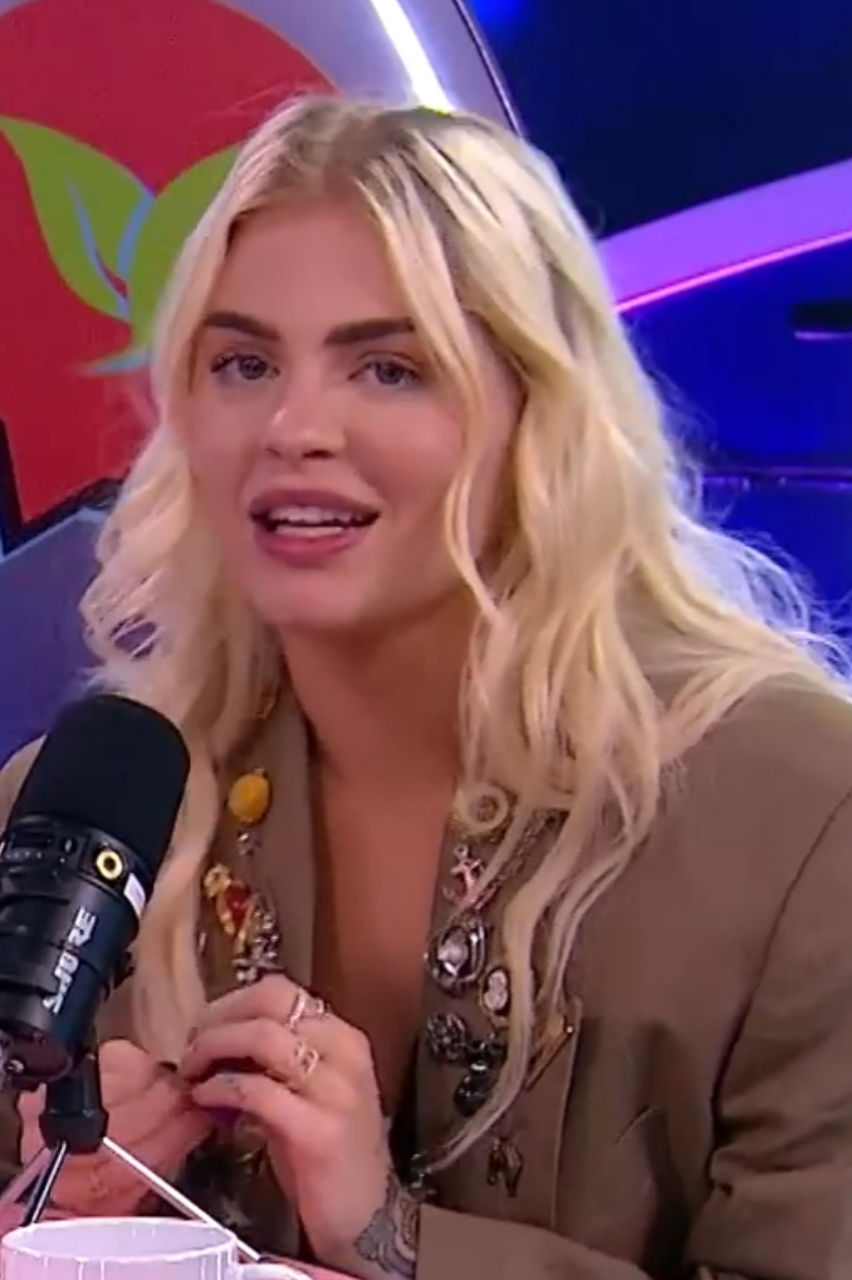
Lovato collaborated with Brazilian singer-songwriter Luísa Sonza (pictured) on the song "Penhasco2", from Sonza's third studio album Escândalo Íntimo.

Key
‡	Indicates song written solely by Lovato
•	Indicates song with non-English lyrics
†	Indicates a cover

Song	Artist(s)	Writer(s)	Album(s)	Year	Ref.
"15 Minutes"	Demi Lovato	Demi Lovato; Justin Tranter; Bianca Atterberry; Gregory Aldea Hein; Warren "Oak" Felder; Trevor Brown; William Zaire Simmons	Dancing with the Devil... the Art of Starting Over	2021	
"29"	Demi Lovato	Demi Lovato; Warren "Oak" Felder; Alex Niceforo; Keith "Ten4" Sorrells; Laura Veltz; Sean Douglas	Holy Fvck	2022	
"4 Ever 4 Me"	Demi Lovato	Demi Lovato; Warren "Oak" Felder; Alex Niceforo; Keith "Ten4" Sorrells; Laura Veltz; Mitch Allan; Susan Joyce	Holy Fvck	2022	
"After Hours"	Demi Lovato	Demi Lovato; James Abrahart; Alna Hofmeyr; Sarah Hudson; Kevin Hickey	It's Not That Deep (Unless You Want It to Be)	2026	
"Aftershock"	Demi Lovato	Amy Pearson; Leah Haywood; Daniel James	Unbroken	2011	
"Ain't No Way" †	Demi Lovato	Carolyn Franklin	Spotify Singles	2017	
"All Night Long"	Demi Lovato featuring Missy Elliott and Timbaland	Demi Lovato; Timothy Mosley; Jim Beanz; Jerome "Jroc" Harmon; Missy Elliott; Lyrica Anderson; Nire; Garland Mosley; Joseph Angel	Unbroken	2011	
"Anyone"	Demi Lovato	Demi Lovato; Bibi Bourelly; Dayyon Alexander; Eyelar Mirzazadeh; Jay Mooncie; Sam Roman	Dancing with the Devil... The Art of Starting Over	2020	
"Avalanche"	Nick Jonas featuring Demi Lovato	T.J. Ruoton; Joseph Kirkland; Jason Dean; Michel Heyaca; Nick Jonas	Nick Jonas	2014	
"Back Around"	Demi Lovato	Demi Lovato; Nick Jonas; Kevin Jonas; Joe Jonas	Don't Forget	2008	
"Before I Knew You"	Demi Lovato	Demi Lovato; Kevin Hickey; Castle; Travis Clark; Sam Hollander; Dave Katz; Jake Torrey	It's Not That Deep	2025	
"Behind Enemy Lines"	Demi Lovato	Demi Lovato; Nick Jonas; Kevin Jonas; Joe Jonas	Don't Forget	2008	
"Believe in Me"	Demi Lovato	Demi Lovato; John Fields; Kara DioGuardi	Don't Forget	2008	
"Body Say"	Demi Lovato	Demi Lovato; Simon Wilcox; Nolan Lambroza	Non-album single	2016	
"Bones"	Demi Lovato	Demi Lovato; Warren "Oak" Felder; Alex Niceforo; Keith "Ten4" Sorrells; Emily Armstrong; Siouxsie Medley; Sean Friday	Holy Fvck	2022	
"Bounce"	Jonas Brothers featuring Demi Lovato and Big Rob	Joe Jonas; Nick Jonas; Demi Lovato	Non-album single	2009	
"Brand New Day"	Demi Lovato	Kara DioGuardi; Mitch Allan	Camp Rock 2: The Final Jam	2010	
"Breakdown"	G-Eazy featuring Demi Lovato	Gerald Gillum; Demi Lovato; Caroline Pennell; Dakarai Gwitira; Jay Stolar; Mick Coogan; Sean Myer	These Things Happen Too	2021	
"Butterfly"	Demi Lovato	Caroline Pennell; Lauren Aquilina; Marcus Andersson	Dancing with the Devil... the Art of Starting Over	2021	
"California Sober"	Demi Lovato	Demi Lovato; Caroline Pennell; Lauren Aquilina; Marcus Andersson; Warren "Oak" Felder; Alex Niceforo; Sam Homaee; Jon Wienner; Keith Sorrells	Dancing with the Devil... the Art of Starting Over	2021	
"Can't Back Down"	Demi Lovato, Alyson Stoner and Anna Maria Perez de Tagle	Antonina Armato; Tim James; Tom Sturges	Camp Rock 2: The Final Jam	2010	
"Carefully"	Demi Lovato	Caroline Pennell; Lauren Aquilina; Marcus Andersson	Dancing with the Devil... the Art of Starting Over	2021	
"Catch Me"	Demi Lovato	Demi Lovato ‡	Here We Go Again	2009	
"Change You"	Demi Lovato	Michael Woods; Kevin White; Trey Campbell; Chloe Angelides	Dancing with the Devil... the Art of Starting Over	2021	
"Chula"	Grupo Firme and Demi Lovato	Demi Lovato; Eduin Caz; Luis Mexia; Manuel Orozco; Oak; Oscar Linnander; Pablo Preciado; Sean Douglas	Non-album single	2024	
"City of Angels"	Demi Lovato	Demi Lovato; Warren "Oak" Felder; Alex Niceforo; Keith "Ten4" Sorrells; Mitch Allan; Jordan Lutes; Salem Ilese Davern	Holy Fvck	2022	
"Come Together"	Demi Lovato	Demi Lovato; Warren "Oak" Felder; Alex Niceforo; Keith "Ten4" Sorrells; Laura Veltz; Sean Douglas	Holy Fvck	2022	
"Commander in Chief"	Demi Lovato	Demi Lovato; Eren Cannata; Finneas O'Connell; Julia Michaels; Justin Tranter	Non-album single	2020	
"Concentrate"	Demi Lovato	Demi Lovato; Jeff Shum; Dayyon Alexander; Jimmy Burney; Adam Tressler	Tell Me You Love Me	2017	
"Confetti"	Demi Lovato	Demi Lovato; Kevin Hickey; Jake Torrey; Feli Ferraro	It's Not That Deep and It's Not That Deep (Unless You Want It to Be)	2025	
"Confident"	Demi Lovato	Demi Lovato; Savan Kotecha; Ilya Salmanzadeh; Max Martin	Confident and Revamped	2015 and 2023	
"Cool for the Summer"	Demi Lovato	Demi Lovato; Savan Kotecha; Max Martin; Ali Payami; Alexander Erik Kronlund	Confident and Revamped	2015 and 2023	
"Cry Baby"	Demi Lovato	Demi Lovato; Taylor Parks; Chloe Angelides; Noonie Bao; Jamie Sanderson; Kevin Hissink	Tell Me You Love Me	2017	
"Daddy Issues"	Demi Lovato	Demi Lovato; Warren "Oak" Felder; William Zaire Simmons; Sean Douglas	Tell Me You Love Me	2017	
"Dancing with the Devil"	Demi Lovato	Demi Lovato; Mitch Allan; Bianca Atterberry; John Ho	Dancing with the Devil... the Art of Starting Over	2021	
"Dead Friends"	Demi Lovato	Demi Lovato; Warren "Oak" Felder; Alex Niceforo; Keith "Ten4" Sorrells; Laura Veltz; Sam Ellis	Holy Fvck	2022	
"Different Summers"	Demi Lovato	Jamie Houston	Camp Rock 2: The Final Jam	2010	
"Don't Forget"	Demi Lovato	Demi Lovato; Nick Jonas; Joe Jonas; Kevin Jonas	Don't Forget and Revamped	2008 and 2023	
"Don't Go Breaking My Heart" †	Q-Tip featuring Demi Lovato	Elton John; Bernie Taupin	Revamp: Reimagining the Songs of Elton John & Bernie Taupin	2018	
"Easy"	Demi Lovato with Noah Cyrus	Taylor Goldsmith; Madison Love; Simon Wilcox; Matthew Koma	Dancing with the Devil... the Art of Starting Over	2021	
"Eat Me"	Demi Lovato featuring Royal & the Serpent	Demi Lovato; Warren "Oak" Felder; Alex Niceforo; Keith "Ten4" Sorrells; Laura Veltz; Ryan Santiago	Holy Fvck	2022	
"Échame la Culpa" •	Luis Fonsi with Demi Lovato	Luis Fonsi; Alejandro Rengifo; Mauricio Rengifo; Andrés Torres	Vida	2017	
"Eve, Psyche & the Bluebeard's Wife (Remix)"	Le Sserafim featuring Demi Lovato	Score (13); Megatone (13) "Hitman" Bang; Supreme Boi; Maia Wright; Max Thulin; Benjmn; Gusten Dahlqvist; Arineh Karimi; Huh Yunjin; Lee Hyung-seok (PNP); Danke; Demi Lovato	Non-album single	2023	
"Every Time You Lie"	Demi Lovato	Demi Lovato; Jon McLaughlin; John Fields	Here We Go Again	2009	
"Everything You're Not"	Demi Lovato	Toby Gad; Demi Lovato; Lindy Robbins	Here We Go Again	2009	
"Fall in Line"	Christina Aguilera featuring Demi Lovato	Christina Aguilera; Audra Mae; Jon Bellion; Jonathan "Jonny" Simpson; Mark Williams; Raul Cubina	Liberation	2018	
"Falling Over Me"	Demi Lovato	Demi Lovato; Jon McLaughlin; John Fields	Here We Go Again	2009	
"Fantasy"	Demi Lovato	Demi Lovato; Kevin Hickey; Jake Torrey; Kiddo	It's Not That Deep	2025	
"Fantasy" (Remix)	Demi Lovato featuring Cobrah	Demi Lovato; Kevin Hickey; Kiddo; Jake Torrey; Clara Christensen	It's Not That Deep (Unless You Want It to Be)	2026	
"Fast"	Demi Lovato	Demi Lovato; Jake Torrey; Chloe Angelides; Kevin Hickey	It's Not That Deep	2025	
"Father"	Demi Lovato	Demi Lovato; Laleh Pourkarim	Confident	2015	
"Feed"	Demi Lovato	Demi Lovato; Warren "Oak" Felder; Alex Niceforo; Keith "Ten4" Sorrells; Laura Veltz; Daniel Tashian; JT Daly	Holy Fvcky	2022	
"FIIMY - Fuck It, I Miss You"	Winnetka Bowling League featuring Demi Lovato	Matthew Koma; Demi Lovato	Pulp	2022	
"Fire Starter"	Demi Lovato	Jarrad "Raz" Rogers; Lindy Robbins; Julia Michaels	Demi	2013	
"Fix a Heart"	Demi Lovato	Emanuel Kiriakou; Priscilla Renea	Unbroken	2011	
"For the Love of a Daughter"	Demi Lovato	William Beckett; Demi Lovato	Unbroken	2011	
"For You"	Demi Lovato	Johan Carlsson; Dalton Grant; Susan H. Catanzaro	Confident	2015	
"Freak"	Demi Lovato featuring Yungblud	Demi Lovato; Warren "Oak" Felder; Alex Niceforo; Keith "Ten4" Sorrells; Laura Veltz; Michael Pollack; Dominic Harrison	Holy Fvck	2022	
"Frequency"	Demi Lovato	Demi Lovato; Kevin Hickey; Jake Torrey; Sarah Hudson	It's Not That Deep	2025	
"Games"	Demi Lovato	Demi Lovato; Trevor Brown; Warren "Oak" Felder; Sean Douglas; William Zaire Simmons	Tell Me You Love Me	2017	
"Get Back"	Demi Lovato	Demi Lovato; Nick Jonas; Joe Jonas; Kevin Jonas	Don't Forget	2008	
"Ghost"	Demi Lovato	Demi Lovato; Kevin Hickey; Jake Torrey; Steph Jones; Brett McLaughlin	It's Not That Deep	2025	
"Gift of a Friend"	Demi Lovato	Demi Lovato; Adam Watts; Andy Dodd	Here We Go Again; Tinker Bell and the Lost Treasure	2009	
"Give Me Love" (Live from Capital FM) †	Demi Lovato	Ed Sheeran; Jake Gosling; Chris Leonard	Demi	2014	
"Give Your Heart a Break"	Demi Lovato	Josh Alexander; Billy Steinberg	Unbroken	2011	
"Give Your Heart a Break" (Rock Version)	Demi Lovato with Bert McCracken from The Used	Josh Alexander; Billy Steinberg	Revamped	2023	
"Gonna Get Caught"	Demi Lovato	Demi Lovato; Joe Jonas; Kevin Jonas; Nick Jonas	Don't Forget	2008	
"Good Place"	Demi Lovato	Demi Lovato; Julia Michaels; Justin Tranter; Eren Cannata	Dancing with the Devil... the Art of Starting Over	2021	
"Got Dynamite"	Demi Lovato	Gary Clark; E. Kidd Bogart; Victoria Horn	Here We Go Again	2009	
"Gray"	Demi Lovato	Demi Lovato; Warren "Oak" Felder; Trevor Brown; William Zaire Simmons; Caroline Ailin; Justin Tranter	Dancing with the Devil... the Art of Starting Over	2021	
"Happy Ending"	Demi Lovato	Demi Lovato; Warren "Oak" Felder; Alex Niceforo; Keith "Ten4" Sorrells; Laura Veltz; Mitch Allan; Jordan Lutes	Holy Fvck	2022	
"Heart Attack"	Demi Lovato	Mitch Allan; Jason Evigan; Sean Douglas; Nikki Williams; Aaron Phillips; Demi Lovato	Demi and Revamped	2013 and 2023	
"Heart by Heart"	Demi Lovato	Diane Warren	The Mortal Instruments: City of Bones	2013	
"Heaven"	Demi Lovato	Demi Lovato; Warren "Oak" Felder; Alex Niceforo; Keith "Ten4" Sorrells; Laura Veltz; Aaron Puckett	Holy Fvck	2022	
"Help Me"	Demi Lovato featuring Dead Sara	Demi Lovato; Warren "Oak" Felder; Alex Niceforo; Keith "Ten4" Sorrells; Emily Armstrong; Siouxsie Medley; Sean Friday	Holy Fvck	2022	
"Here All Night"	Demi Lovato	Demi Lovato; Kevin Hickey; Alna Hofmeyr; Sarah Hudson; Brett McLaughlin	It's Not That Deep	2025	
"Here Comes the Sun" †	Naya Rivera and Demi Lovato	George Harrison	Glee Sings the Beatles	2013	
"Here We Go Again"	Demi Lovato	Isaac Hasson; Lindy Robbins; Mher Filian	Here We Go Again	2009	
"Hitchhiker"	Demi Lovato	Demi Lovato; Jeff Shum; Dayyon Alexander; Jimmy Burney; Adam Tressler; Winston Howard	Tell Me You Love Me	2017	
"Hold On" †	Glee Cast with Adam Lambert and Demi Lovato	Carnie Wilson; Chynna Phillips; Glen Ballard	—N/a	2014	
"Hold Up"	Demi Lovato	Daniel James; Leah Haywood; Demi Lovato; Ross Golan	Unbroken	2011	
"Holy Fvck"	Demi Lovato	Demi Lovato; Warren "Oak" Felder; Alex Niceforo; Keith "Ten4" Sorrells; Laura Veltz; Salem Ilese Davern	Holy Fvck	2022	
"I Believe"	DJ Khaled featuring Demi Lovato	Khaled Khaled; Demi Lovato; Denisia "Blu June" Andrews; Brittany Coney	A Wrinkle in Time	2018	
"I Hate You, Don't Leave Me"	Demi Lovato	Demi Lovato; E. Kidd Bogart; Andrew Goldstein; Emanuel Kiriakou	Demi	2013	
"I Love Me"	Demi Lovato	Demi Lovato; Anne-Marie Nicholson; Sean Douglas; Jennifer Decilveo; Alex Niceforo; Keith Sorrells; Warren "Oak" Felder	Non-album single	2020	
"I Will Survive" †	Demi Lovato	Freddie Perren; Dino Fekaris	The Angry Birds Movie	2016	
"ICU (Madison's Lullabye)"	Demi Lovato	Demi Lovato; Bianca Atterberry; Philip Cornish	Dancing with the Devil... the Art of Starting Over	2021	
"I'll Be Home for Christmas" †	Demi Lovato	Buck Ram; Kim Gannon; Walter Kent	Spotify Singles	2017	
"I'm Ready"	Sam Smith and Demi Lovato	Sam Smith; Demi Lovato; Ilya Salmanzadeh; Savan Kotecha; Peter Svensson	Love Goes	2020	
"I'm Sorry"	Demi Lovato	Ryan Vojtesak; Chloe Angelides	Dancing with the Devil... the Art of Starting Over	2021	
"In Case"	Demi Lovato	Emanuel Kiriakou; Priscilla Renea	Demi	2013	
"In My Head"	Demi Lovato	Demi Lovato; Kevin Hickey; Charlotte Sands; Oscar Linnander; Jordan Lutes; Keith Sorrells	It's Not That Deep	2025	
"In Real Life"	Demi Lovato	Bleu; Lindsey Ray	Unbroken	2011	
"In the Mirror"	Demi Lovato	Jörgen Elofsson	Eurovision Song Contest: The Story of Fire Saga (Music from the Netflix Film)	2020	
"Instruction"	Jax Jones featuring Demi Lovato and Stefflon Don	Jax Jones; Demi Lovato; Stefflon Don; MNEK	Tell Me You Love Me	2017	
"Intro"	Demi Lovato	—N/a	Dancing with the Devil... the Art of Starting Over	2021	
"Irresistible"	Fall Out Boy featuring Demi Lovato	Fall Out Boy	Non-album single	2015	
"It's Not Too Late"	Demi Lovato	Adam Watts; Andy Dodd	Camp Rock 2: The Final Jam	2010	
"It's On"	Camp Rock 2: The Final Jam cast	Lyrica Anderson; Toby Gad; Michael Myvett	Camp Rock 2: The Final Jam	2010	
"Joshua Tree"	Demi Lovato	Demi Lovato; Kevin Hickey; Justin Tranter; Bianca Atterberry	It's Not That Deep	2025	
"Joshua Tree" (Remix)	Demi Lovato featuring Rose Gray	Demi Lovato; Kevin Hickey; Justin Tranter; Bianca Atterberry	It's Not That Deep (Unless You Want It to Be)	2026	
"Kingdom Come"	Demi Lovato featuring Iggy Azalea	Demi Lovato; Julia Michaels; Amethyst Kelly; Steve Mac	Confident	2015	
"Kiss"	Demi Lovato	Demi Lovato; Brett McLaughlin; Steph Jones; Jake Torrey; Kevin Hickey	It's Not That Deep	2025	
"La La Land"	Demi Lovato	Demi Lovato; Nick Jonas; Joe Jonas; Kevin Jonas	Don't Forget	2008	
"La La Land" (Rock Version)	Demi Lovato featuring Nita Strauss	Demi Lovato; Nick Jonas; Joe Jonas; Kevin Jonas	Revamped	2023	
"Let It Go"	Demi Lovato	Kristen Anderson-Lopez; Robert Lopez	Frozen; Demi	2013	
"Let Me Down Easy" †	Daisy Jones & the Six with Demi Lovato	Blake Mills; Ali Tamposi; James Valentine; Z Berg	Non-album single	2023	
"Let You Go"	Demi Lovato	Demi Lovato; Kevin Hickey; Jake Torrey; Castle	It's Not That Deep	2025	
"Lightweight"	Demi Lovato	Timothy Mosley; Jim Beanz; Garland Mosley; Shanna Crooks; Frankie Storm	Unbroken	2011	
"Lionheart"	Demi Lovato	Steve Mac; Ina Wroldsen	Confident	2015	
"Little Bit"	Demi Lovato	Demi Lovato; Kevin Hickey; Jake Torrey; Feli Ferraro	It's Not That Deep	2025	
"Lo Que Soy" • (Note: "Lo Que Soy" is the Spanish version of "This Is Me".)	Demi Lovato	Adam Watts; Andy Dodd	Don't Forget	2008	
"Lonely"	Demi Lovato featuring Lil Wayne	DJ Mustard; Sarah Aarons; Lil Wayne	Tell Me You Love Me	2017	
"Lonely Hearts"	JoJo and Demi Lovato	JoJo; Elizabeth Lowell Boland; Martin McKinney; Merna Bishouty; Dylan Wiggins	Good to Know	2020	
"Lonely People"	Demi Lovato	Demi Lovato; Caroline Pennell; Justin Tranter; Billy Walsh; Warren "Oak" Felder; Trevor Brown; William Zaire Simmons	Dancing with the Devil... the Art of Starting Over	2021	
"Low Rise Jeans"	Demi Lovato	Demi Lovato; Uzoechi Emenike; Sarah Hudson; Brett McLaughlin; Jake Torrey; Kevin Hickey	It's Not That Deep (Unless You Want It to Be)	2026	
"Love Controller"	Demi Lovato	Demi Lovato; James Abrahart; Jason Evigan; Sarah Hudson; Jessie Ware; Kevin Hickey	It's Not That Deep (Unless You Want It to Be)	2026	
"Mad World" †	Demi Lovato	Roland Orzabal	Dancing with the Devil... the Art of Starting Over	2021	
"Made in the USA"	Demi Lovato	Demi Lovato; Jonas Jeberg; Jason Evigan; Corey Chorus; Blair Perkins	Demi	2013	
"Make a Wave"	Demi Lovato and Joe Jonas	Scott Krippayne; Jeff Peabody	Disney's Friends for Change	2010	
"Me, Myself and Time"	Demi Lovato	Antonina Armato; Tim James; Devrim Karaoglu	Sonny with a Chance	2010	
"Melon Cake"	Demi Lovato	Demi Lovato; Julia Michaels; Justin Tranter; Eren Cannata	Dancing with the Devil... the Art of Starting Over	2021	
"Met Him Last Night"	Demi Lovato featuring Ariana Grande	Ariana Grande; Albert Stanaj; Tommy Brown; Courageous Xavier Herrera	Dancing with the Devil... the Art of Starting Over	2021	
"Mistake"	Demi Lovato	Daniel James; Leah Haywood; Shelly Peiken	Unbroken	2011	
"Monsters"	All Time Low featuring Demi Lovato and Blackbear	Alex Gaskarth; Andrew Goldstein; Demi Lovato; Jack Barakat; Kevin Fisher; Matthew Musto	Non-album single	2020	
"Moves Me"	Demi Lovato	Demi Lovato ‡	Non-album single	2004	
"Mr. Hughes"	Demi Lovato	Demi Lovato; Johan Carlsson	Confident	2015	
"My Girlfriends Are My Boyfriends"	Demi Lovato featuring Saweetie	Demi Lovato; Saweetie; Madison Love; Michael Pollack; Andrew "Pop" Wansel; Warren "Oak" Felder	Dancing with the Devil... the Art of Starting Over	2021	
"My Love Is like a Star"	Demi Lovato	Toby Gad; James Morrison	Unbroken	2011	
"My Reputation"	Jeezy featuring Demi Lovato and Lil Duval	Jay Jenkins; Brian Cook; Jimmy Jam; Terry Lewis; Roland Powell	The Recession 2	2020	
"My Song for You"	Demi Lovato and Joe Jonas	Kari Kimmel; Scott Krippayne	—N/a	2010	
"Neon Lights"	Demi Lovato	Demi Lovato; Mario Marchetti; Tiffany Vartanyan; Ryan Tedder; Noel Zancanella	Demi	2013	
"Neon Lights" (Rock Version)	Demi Lovato with The Maine	Demi Lovato; Mario Marchetti; Tiffany Vartanyan; Ryan Tedder; Noel Zancanella	Revamped	2023	
"Never Been Hurt"	Demi Lovato	Demi Lovato; Ali Tamposi; Jason Evigan; Jordan Johnson; Marcus Lomax; Stefan Johnson	Demi	2013	
"Nightingale"	Demi Lovato	Demi Lovato; Anne Preven; Matt Radosevich; Felicia Barton	Demi	2013	
"No Promises"	Cheat Codes featuring Demi Lovato	Demi Lovato; Trevor Dahl; Lauv; Loote	Non-album single	2017	
"Nothing On but the Lights"	Demi Lovato	Demi Lovato; Uzoechi Emenike; Margo Wildman; Kevin Hickey	It's Not That Deep (Unless You Want It to Be)	2026	
"Ok Not to Be Ok"	Marshmello featuring Demi Lovato	Demi Lovato; Christopher Comstock; Gregory Hein; James Gutch; Nick Bailey	Non-album single	2020	
"Old Ways"	Demi Lovato	Jason Evigan; Scott Matthew Hoffman; Olivia Waithe	Confident	2015	
"On the Line"	Demi Lovato featuring Jonas Brothers	Demi Lovato; Kevin Jonas; Nick Jonas; Joe Jonas	Don't Forget	2008	
"One and the Same"	Demi Lovato and Selena Gomez	Dave Derby; Colleen Fitzpatrick; Michael Kotch	Disney Channel Playlist	2009	
"Only Forever"	Demi Lovato	Demi Lovato; Sean Douglas; Warren "Oak" Felder; Toby Gad; Ilsey Juber	Tell Me You Love Me	2017	
"Our Time Is Here"	Demi Lovato, Aaryn Doyle and Meaghan Martin	Antonina Armato; Tim James	Camp Rock	2008	
"Papa Was a Rollin' Stone" †	Slash featuring Demi Lovato	Norman Whitfield; Barrett Strong	Orgy of the Damned	2024	
"Party"	Demi Lovato	Demi Lovato; John Fields; Robert Schwartzman	Don't Forget	2008	
"Penhasco2" •	Luísa Sonza with Demi Lovato	Luísa Sonza; Demi Lovato; Douglas Moda; Carol Biazin; Carolzinha; Day Limns; Jenni Mosello; Papatinho; Roy Lenzo	Escândalo Íntimo	2023	
"Pretty Catatonic"	Demi Lovato	Demi Lovato; Julia Michaels; Kevin Hickey; Steph Jones	It's Not That Deep (Unless You Want It to Be)	2026	
"Quiet"	Demi Lovato	Demi Lovato; Scott Cutler; Anne Preven	Here We Go Again	2009	
"Rascacielo" • (Note: "Rascacielo" is the Spanish version of "Skyscraper".)	Demi Lovato	Toby Gad; Kerli Kõiv; Lindy Robbins	Unbroken	2011	
"Ready for Ya"	Demi Lovato	Demi Lovato; Nick Jonas; Sir Nolan; Simon Wilcox	Tell Me You Love Me	2017	
"Really Don't Care"	Demi Lovato featuring Cher Lloyd	Demi Lovato; Carl Falk; Savan Kotecha; Rami Yacoub; Cher Lloyd	Demi	2013	
"Remember December"	Demi Lovato	Demi Lovato; John Fields; Anne Preven	Here We Go Again	2009	
"Roar" †	Glee Cast with Adam Lambert and Demi Lovato	Katy Perry; Lukasz Gottwald; Max Martin; Bonnie McKee; Henry Walter	A Katy or a Gaga	2013	
"Ruin the Friendship"	Demi Lovato	Demi Lovato; Ido Zmishlany; Brittany Amaradio; Chloe Angelides	Tell Me You Love Me	2017	
"Say It"	Demi Lovato	Demi Lovato; Kevin Hickey; Jake Torrey; Feli Ferraro	It's Not That Deep	2025	
"Send It On"	Demi Lovato, Jonas Brothers, Miley Cyrus and Selena Gomez	Adam Anders; Nikki Hassman; Peer Åström	Disney's Friends for Change	2009	
"Sexy Dirty Love"	Demi Lovato	Demi Lovato; Warren "Oak" Felder; Trevor Brown; William Zaire Simmons	Tell Me You Love Me	2017	
"Shouldn't Come Back"	Demi Lovato	Demi Lovato; Rami Yacoub; Carl Falk; Savan Kotecha	Demi	2013	
"Skin of My Teeth"	Demi Lovato	Demi Lovato; Warren "Oak" Felder; Alex Niceforo; Keith Sorrells; Laura Veltz; Aaron Puckett	Holy Fvck	2022	
"Skyscraper"	Demi Lovato	Toby Gad; Kerli Kõiv; Lindy Robbins	Unbroken and Revamped	2011 and 2023	
"Smoke and Mirrors"	Demi Lovato	Sarah Aarons; Ben Abraham	Tell Me You Love Me	2017	
"So Far, So Great"	Demi Lovato	Jeannie Lurie; Aris Archontis; Chen Neeman	Sonny with a Chance; Here We Go Again	2009	
"Sober"	Demi Lovato	Demi Lovato; Mark Landon; RØMANS; Tushar Apte	Non-album single	2018	
"Solo"	Demi Lovato	Demi Lovato; Scott Cutler; Anne Preven	Here We Go Again	2009	
"Solo"	Clean Bandit featuring Demi Lovato	Grace Chatto; Jack Patterson; Camille Purcell; Fred Gibson	What Is Love?	2018	
"Somebody to You"	The Vamps featuring Demi Lovato	Carl Falk; Savan Kotecha; Kristian Lundin	Somebody to You; Meet the Vamps	2014	
"Something That We're Not"	Demi Lovato	Demi Lovato; Andrew Goldstein; Emanuel Kiriakou; Savan Kotecha	Demi	2013	
"Sorry Not Sorry"	Demi Lovato	Demi Lovato; Trevor Brown; Warren "Oak" Felder; Sean Douglas; William Zaire Simmons	Tell Me You Love Me	2017	
"Sorry Not Sorry" (Rock Version)	Demi Lovato featuring Slash	Demi Lovato; Trevor Brown; Warren "Oak" Felder; Sean Douglas; William Zaire Simmons	Revamped	2023	
"Sorry to Myself"	Demi Lovato	Demi Lovato; Kevin Hickey; Kiddo; Justin Tranter	It's Not That Deep	2025	
"Stars"	Demi Lovato	Demi Lovato; Carl Falk; Savan Kotecha; Alexander Erik Kronlund; Rami Yacoub	Confident	2015	
"Still Alive"	Demi Lovato	Demi Lovato; Laura Veltz; Mike Shinoda	Non-album single	2023	
"Still Have Me"	Demi Lovato	Demi Lovato; Chloe Angelides; Sean Myer	Non-album single	2020	
"Stop the World"	Demi Lovato	Demi Lovato; Nick Jonas; PJ Bianco	Here We Go Again	2009	
"Stone Cold"	Demi Lovato	Demi Lovato; Laleh Pourkarim; Gustaf Thörn	Confident	2015	
"Substance"	Demi Lovato	Demi Lovato; Warren "Oak" Felder; Alex Niceforo; Keith "Ten4" Sorrells; Laura Veltz; Jordan Lutes	Holy Fvck	2022	
"Sunset"	Demi Lovato	Demi Lovato; Bianca Atterberry; Trevor David Brown; Warren "Oak" Felder; William Zaire Simmons	Dancing with the Devil... the Art of Starting Over	2021	
"Swine"	Demi Lovato	Demi Lovato; Alex Niceforo; Keith "Ten4" Sorrells; Laura Veltz; Upsahl; Warren "Oak" Felder	Non-album single	2023	
"Take Me to Church" (Live from Live Lounge) †	Demi Lovato	Andrew Hozier-Byrne	—N/a	2015	
"Tell Me You Love Me"	Demi Lovato	Kirby Lauryen; Stint; John Hill	Tell Me You Love Me and Revamped	2017 and 2023	
"That's How You Know" †	Demi Lovato	Alan Menken; Stephen Schwartz	Disneymania 6	2008	
"The Art of Starting Over"	Demi Lovato	Demi Lovato; Caroline Pennell; Warren "Oak" Felder; Trevor Brown; William Zaire Simmons	Dancing with the Devil... the Art of Starting Over	2021	
"The Happening" †	Glee Cast with Adam Lambert and Demi Lovato	Holland–Dozier–Holland; DeVol	—N/a	2014	
"The Kind of Lover I Am"	Demi Lovato	Demi Lovato; Julia Michaels; Caroline Pennell; Justin Tranter; Warren "Oak" Felder; Trevor Brown; William Zaire Simmons	Dancing with the Devil... the Art of Starting Over	2021	
"The Middle"	Demi Lovato	Kara DioGuardi; John Fields; Jason Reeves	Don't Forget	2008	
"The Way You Don't Look at Me"	Demi Lovato	Demi Lovato; Julia Michaels; Caroline Pennell; Justin Tranter; Jussifer; Eren Cannata	Dancing with the Devil... the Art of Starting Over	2021	
"This Is Me"	Demi Lovato and Joe Jonas	Adam Watts; Andy Dodd	Camp Rock	2008	
"This Is Our Song"	Demi Lovato, Joe Jonas, Nick Jonas and Alyson Stoner	Adam Watts; Andy Dodd	Camp Rock 2: The Final Jam	2010	
"Together"	Demi Lovato featuring Jason Derulo	Demi Lovato; Timothy Mosley; Jim Beanz; Lyrica Anderson; Tiyon Mack; Garland Mosley	Unbroken	2011	
"Too Good at Goodbyes" (Live from Live Lounge) †	Demi Lovato	Sam Smith; James Napier; Mikkel Storleer Eriksen; Tor Erik Hermansen	—N/a	2017	
"Trainwreck"	Demi Lovato	Demi Lovato ‡	Don't Forget	2008	
"Two Pieces"	Demi Lovato	Livvi Franc; Mitch Allan; Jason Evigan	Demi	2013	
"Two Worlds Collide"	Demi Lovato	Demi Lovato; Kevin Jonas; Nick Jonas; Joe Jonas	Don't Forget	2008	
"U Got Nothin' On Me"	Demi Lovato	Demi Lovato; Isaac Hasson; Mher Filian	Here We Go Again	2009	
"Unbroken"	Demi Lovato	Demi Lovato; Daniel James; Leah Haywood	Unbroken	2011	
"Unforgettable (Tommy's Song)"	Demi Lovato	Demi Lovato; Sarah Aarons; Andrew "Pop" Wansel; Warren "Oak" Felder	—N/a	2021	
"Until You're Mine"	Demi Lovato	Adam Watts; Andy Dodd	Don't Forget	2008	
"Up"	Olly Murs featuring Demi Lovato	Wayne Hector; Daniel Davidsen; Maegan Cottone; Peter Wallevik; Mich Hansen	Never Been Better; Demi	2014	
"Waitin for You"	Demi Lovato featuring Sirah	Demi Lovato; Julia Michaels; Jason Evigan; Sara Mitchell; Steve Mac	Confident	2015	
"Warrior"	Demi Lovato	Demi Lovato; Andrew Goldstein; Emanuel Kiriakou; Lindy Robbins	Demi	2013	
"Wasted"	Demi Lovato	Demi Lovato; Warren "Oak" Felder; Alex Niceforo; Keith "Ten4" Sorrells; Laura Veltz; Sean Douglas	Holy Fvck	2022	
"We Rock"	Camp Rock cast	Kara DioGuardi; Greg Wells	Camp Rock	2008	
"We'll Be a Dream"	We the Kings featuring Demi Lovato	Travis Clark	Smile Kid	2009	
"What Other People Say"	Sam Fischer and Demi Lovato	Sam Fischer; Demi Lovato; Geoff Warburton; Ryan Williamson	Dancing with the Devil... The Art of Starting Over	2021	
"What to Do"	Demi Lovato	Jeannie Lurie; Aris Archontis; Chen Neeman	Sonny with a Chance	2010	
"What We Came Here For"	Demi Lovato, Joe Jonas, Nick Jonas, Alyson Stoner and Anna Maria Perez de Tagle	Jamie Houston	Camp Rock 2: The Final Jam	2010	
"Who Will I Be?"	Demi Lovato	Matthew Gerrard; Robbie Nevil	Camp Rock	2008	
"Who's That Boy?"	Demi Lovato featuring Dev	Ryan Tedder; Noel Zancanella; Devin Tailes	Unbroken	2011	
"Why Don't You Love Me?"	Hot Chelle Rae featuring Demi Lovato	Nash Overstreet; Martin Johnson	Whatever	2011	
"Wildfire"	Demi Lovato	Ryan Tedder; Mikkel Eriksen; Tor Erik Hermansen; Nicole Morier	Confident	2015	
"Without a Fight"	Brad Paisley featuring Demi Lovato	Brad Paisley; Kelley Lovelace; Lee Thomas Miller	—N/a	2016	
"Without the Love"	Demi Lovato	Demi Lovato; Matt Squire; Roy Battle; Freddy Wexler	Demi	2013	
"Wonderful Christmastime" †	Demi Lovato	Paul McCartney	All Wrapped Up	2008	
"Work of Art"	Demi Lovato	Adam Anders; Nikki Hasman; Pam Sheyne	Sonny with a Chance	2010	
"World of Chances"	Demi Lovato	Demi Lovato; John Mayer	Here We Go Again	2009	
"Wouldn't Change a Thing"	Demi Lovato featuring Joe Jonas or Stanfour	Adam Anders; Nikki Hassman; Peer Astrom	Camp Rock 2: The Final Jam	2010	
"Yes"	Demi Lovato	Demi Lovato; Laleh Pourkarim	Confident	2015	
"Yes I Am"	Demi Lovato	Dapo Torimiro; Priscilla Renea	Unbroken	2011	
"You Don't Do It for Me Anymore"	Demi Lovato	Demi Lovato; Jonas Jeberg; Chloe Angelides; James "Gladius" Wong; Ashlyn Wilson	Tell Me You Love Me	2017	
"You'll Be OK, Kid"	Demi Lovato	Demi Lovato; Laura Veltz; Sasha Alex Sloan; Warren "Oak" Felder	Non-album single	2024	
"You're My Favorite Song"	Demi Lovato and Joe Jonas	Aris Archonthis; Chen Neeman; Jeannie Lurie	Camp Rock 2: The Final Jam	2010	
"You're My Only Shorty"	Demi Lovato featuring Iyaz	Antonina Armato; Tim James	Unbroken	2011	

== Unreleased songs ==
Unreleased songs recorded by Demi Lovato
Song	Notes	Ref.
"Abracadabra"	Written by Lovato, Lyrica Anderson, Joseph Angel, Missy Elliott, J-Roc, Timbaland, Chris Godbey, Sebastian, Erin Reed, and Jim Beanz.; Registered on Broadcast Music, Inc. (BMI).	
"Afterglow"	Collaboration with Nick Jonas.; Intended for Nick Jonas.	
"Ain't No Friend"	Intended for Dancing with the Devil... the Art of Starting Over.; Leaked in May 2020.	
"Bad Chick"	Intended for Demi.; Leaked in October 2017.	
"Besame Mucho" •	Written by Lovato, Priscilla Renea, and Dapo Torimiro.; Registered on BMI.	
"Better"	Leaked in May 2020.	
"Daydream"	Written by Avril Lavigne and Chantal Kreviazuk.; Intended for Don't Forget.; Lovato included the song on the set list of Demi Live! Warm Up Tour.; Later released by Miranda Cosgrove on Sparks Fly (2010).	
"Fall In Love"	Written by Lovato, Christina Aguilera, and Audra Mae.; Registered on ASCAP.	
"Human"	Written by Steve Mac and Ina Wroldsen.; Registered on Australian Performing Rights Association (APRA).	
"Kissing New People"	Written by Lovato and Bianca Atterberry.; Later released by Maeta featuring Ty Dolla Sign on When I Hear Your Name (2023).	
"Love Don't Let Me Go"	Written by Marshmello, Louis Bell, Brian Lee, Ali Tamposi, and Andrew Watt.; Collaboration with Marshmello.; Intended to be released in 2017.; Registered on American Society of Composers, Authors and Publishers (ASCAP).	
"Love Is the Answer"	Written by Lovato and John Mayer.; Intended for Here We Go Again.	
"Love Is the Name"	Written by Steve Mac and Ina Wroldsen.; Later released by Sofia Carson in 2016.	
"Magical"	A duet with Wilmer Valderrama as a part of Charming soundtrack.; Written by Sia Furler and Chris Braide.	
"My Kind of Crazy"	Written by E. Kidd Bogart, Emanuel Kiriakou, and Lindy Robbins.	
"My Stupid Heart"	Written by Josh Alexander, Jason Evigan, and Billy Steinberg.; Registered on BMI.; Later released by Tini for her self-titled album (2016).	
"Pattern"	Leaked in May 2020.	
"Pillow Talk"	Written by Bianca Atterberry, Trevor Brown, Jordan Fisher, William "Zaire" Simmons, and Michael Patrick Smith.; Registered on ASCAP.	
"Proof"	Written by Lovato, Denarius "Motesart" Motes, and Marlin "Hookman" Bonds.	
"Roommates"	Written by Lovato, Mitch Allan, Mark Landon, Brett McLaughlin, Chloe Angelides, and Nick Lopez.; Intended for Dancing with the Devil... the Art of Starting Over.; Later released by Dixie D'Amelio.	
"Say a Prayer"	Written by Lovato, Bianca Atterberry, and John Ho.; Collaboration with YG.; Intended for Dancing with the Devil... the Art of Starting Over.; Featured on the documentary Demi Lovato: Dancing with the Devil.	
"Say My Name"	Written by David Guetta, Giorgio Tuinfort, Boaz van der Beatz, José Balvin, Alejandro Ramirez, Thomas Troelsen, Emily Warren, Britt Burton, Philip Leigh, and Matt Holmes; Later released by David Guetta, Bebe Rexha and J Balvin under the same title.; Leaked in May 2020	
"Shut Up and Love Me"	Written by Lovato and John Mayer.; Registered on ASCAP.	
"Single"	Written by Lovato, Savan Kotecha, Ilya Salmanzadeh, Max Martin, and Rami Yacoub.; Registered on ASCAP.	
"So Do I"	Written by Lovato, King Henry, Laura Veltz, and Sasha Alex Sloan.; Registered on ASCAP.; Later released by Tenille Arts on To Be Honest (2024).	
"The Beauty"	Written by Lovato, Oscar Holter, and Taylor Parks.; Registered on ASCAP.	
"The Middle"	Written by Jordan K. Johnson, Marcus Lomax, Stefan Johnson, and Sarah Aarons.; Intended for Tell Me You Love Me.; Later released by Zedd, Maren Morris, and Grey under the same title.; Leaked in December 2021	
"Too Much Love"	Written by Carl Falk, Rami Yacoub, and Savan Kotecha.; Intended for Demi.; Leaked in August 2016.	
"Trouble"	Written by Lovato and Dave Bassett.	
"We're Taking Over"	Written by Lovato, Andrew Goldstein, Emanuel Kiriakou, and Lindy Robbins.; Later released by Bea Miller on Not an Apology (2015).	

== See also ==
- Demi Lovato discography
