= I Love Me (song) =

2020 single by Demi Lovato

Single by Demi Lovato
- B-side: "Still Have Me"
- Released: March 6, 2020
- Studio: SuCasa Recording (Los Angeles, CA)
- Genre: Pop; R&B
- Length: 3:23
- Label: Island; Republic
- Songwriters: Demi Lovato; Anne-Marie Nicholson; Jennifer Decilveo; Alex Niceforo; Sean Douglas; Keith Sorrells; Warren "Oak" Felder
- Producers: Alex Nice; Keith Sorrells; Warren "Oak" Felder

Demi Lovato singles chronology
"Anyone" (2020)	"I Love Me" (2020)	"I'm Ready" (2020)

Music video
- "I Love Me" on YouTube

"I Love Me" is a song by American singer Demi Lovato. It was released on March 6, 2020. The track was written by Lovato alongside Anne-Marie, Jennifer Decilveo, Sean Douglas, Alex Niceforo, Keith Sorrells and Warren "Oak" Felder, with production being handled by the latter three. It is an midtempo pop and R&B song, with lyrics about struggles with self-image. The song was originally intended to be the lead single off of Lovato's seventh studio album Dancing with the Devil... the Art of Starting Over, but was ultimately scrapped from the final tracklist. The song was later included on the digital expanded edition of the album.

The music video for "I Love Me" was directed by Hannah Lux Davis and filmed in New York City. It was released on March 6, 2020, and features Lovato walking across a street with several references to moments in her career and personal life. "I Love Me" was met with positive reviews from music critics, received several nominations at MTV awards and was named by Billboard as one of the best songs of the year. The song peaked at number four in Hungary, number 13 in Scotland, and number 18 in the United States. It earned a platinum certification by the Recording Industry Association of America (RIAA), double platinum in Brazil, and gold in Australia.

== Development and release ==
"I Love Me" was written by Lovato alongside Anne-Marie, Jennifer Decilveo, Sean Douglas, Alex Niceforo, Keith Sorrells and Warren "Oak" Felder and produced by the latter three. According to Anne-Marie, she co-wrote the song with other songwriters in 2019 before Lovato heard it and recorded it. In an interview on The Ellen DeGeneres Show, Lovato described the track as "fun and lighthearted" with a "positive, upbeat message".

On March 2, 2020, she announced via Instagram that her new single "I Love Me" would be released four days later, attaching the cover art to the post. The artwork is a blurry picture of Lovato wearing a red jacket on a city street with the title of the single in the left upper corner. Lovato had previously used the title of the single as a hashtag for another Instagram picture on February 24. "I Love Me" music video and song was released on March 6, 2020, on both digital download and streaming platforms, as the original lead single from her seventh studio album Dancing with the Devil... the Art of Starting Over but was scrapped. Four days later, limited edition alternative cover signed CD singles of the song were made available for purchase for twenty-four hours via Lovato's official online store, On March 12, vinyls with a different alternative cover were released for approximately four hours. On May 5, 2020, an emo version of the song featuring punk rock drummer Travis Barker was announced for release the next day.

== Composition ==
"I Love Me" is an upbeat pop and R&B song, with a length of three minutes and twenty-three seconds. The chorus features drum instrumentation that stops while Lovato sings the line "I wonder when 'I love me' is enough".

In an interview with Apple Music's Hanuman Welch, Lovato said "I Love Me" talks about "loving yourself", adding, "It's an anthem, and it talks about how hard we are on ourselves and this, the negative self-talk. You know, how easily we can listen to that. But when is loving yourself gonna be enough?". On The Ellen DeGeneres Show, she explained the title of the song, saying, "We are good by ourselves. We don't need a partner, we don't need, like, substance. We're good." During the first verse, Lovato sings about her past problems with eating disorders and body image, "Can't see what I am, I just see what I'm not / I'm guilty 'bout everything that I eat (every single thing)".

Taylor Weatherby of Billboard said the song is about Lovato's "battle with her mental health", as exemplified in the chorus, "Oh, why do I compare myself to everyone?/ And I always got my finger on the self-destruct/ I wonder when I love me is enough". Rania Aniftos of the same magazine described "I Love Me" as a "self-love" and "empowering" song. Marcus Jones of Entertainment Weekly said the track focuses on "self-love" and noted it was more upbeat than Lovato's previous single, "Anyone". Kelly Wynne of Newsweek also deemed it an "ode to self and the powers each person holds as an individual."

== Critical reception ==
Chris Murphy of Vulture labeled "I Love Me" a "rousing, introspective pop song about self-love and self-doubt". Mike Nied of Idolator called the song a "bop with a very important message", adding it "packs just as much personality as 'Sorry Not Sorry' but feels more elevated". Claire Shaffer and Althea Legaspi of Rolling Stone praised the music video in an article entitled "Demi Lovato Confidently Showcases 'I Love Me' is Enough in New Music Video", saying "Her confident stride and dancing showcases the resilience that's found in learning to love one's self." Heran Mamo of Billboard, referring to the lyric video that depicts vintage New York City, said that "The way Lovato picks herself up in the song and transmits that uplifting message to her fans is seen in the low-angle skyscraper shots, signifying how one can rise above his or her own turmoil by comparing themselves to the grand buildings rising above the entire city. The concept harkens back to her 2011 'Skyscraper' single, where she boldly claims in the chorus, 'I will be rising from the ground/ Like a skyscraper.'"

Layla McMurtrie of The Eastern Echo called "I Love Me" "a more fun and lighthearted song" as a follow-up to Lovato's "powerful Grammy performance" and that "unlike her past two soft, emotional singles 'Anyone' and 'Sober,' this new song is more of a fun radio pop-hit." McMurtie continued with praise for the song's "super heartfelt and raw" lyrics, which she deemed as "containing a meaningful message and good vibes" and that "I Love Me" is "an empowering and perfect beginning to Women's History Month" because it "presents a strong and independent woman who has grown drastically as both an artist and an individual." Billboard named it the 67th best song of 2020.

== Music video ==
A music video for "I Love Me" was directed by Hannah Lux Davis and filmed in New York City. On March 5, 2020, Lovato released a 30-second teaser of the music video on digital platforms. It premiered on MTV Live on March 6, 2020, and was later uploaded to YouTube. It amassed 5.8 million views on YouTube in its first 24 hours available on the platform.

Lovato said the video was by far the "most emotional" for her to shoot and explained that it was important to add "special easter eggs" that represented certain times and incidents in her life.

=== Synopsis and interpretation ===
In the first scene, three versions of Lovato appear in a house, with two of them fighting each other. The other one, referred to as "Zen Demi" by both MTV News' Madeline Roth and Yahoo! Music's Suzy Byrne, is dressed in white and trying to meditate. This scene parallels the line "I'm a black belt when I'm beating up on myself". Wran Graves of Consequence of Sound opined it was "dramatization of depression". Olivia Singh of Insider said the fight was a reference to Lovato's "personal battles with her demons" as well as her skills in mixed martial arts.

Later, Lovato gets out of the house wearing a red jacket and walking across the fictional "I Love Me St." in New York City, where multiple references to her past are shown. While in the street, a blonde woman appears with two daughters dressed in 1990s clothing and taking them to an acting audition. This represents Lovato herself at a young age with her mother Dianna De La Garza and sister Dallas Lovato, with the former tweeting, "I feel like I was looking for an audition address [...] my doppelgänger is beautiful!". Later, a woman wearing a black bodysuit, sunglasses and short hair accompanied by bodyguards is depicted walking in the street. The woman references Lovato while promoting her 2015 studio album Confident on the Future Now Tour. In the next scene, Lovato passes by and smiles to a young girl holding a microphone and surrounded by three boys, whose looks and outfits resemble the characters that Lovato and the Jonas Brothers played in the 2008 Disney Channel film Camp Rock.

As she keeps on walking, Lovato passes by three men in golden jackets, to whom she smiles and cuts her eyes to. Desiree Murphy of Entertainment Tonight opined the three men were a reference to the Jonas Brothers, whom Lovato has worked with on different acting and music projects. On the other hand, Singh wrote the scene represented Lovato "being happy about the good times they shared, but also accepting that they've gone on separate paths". The singer later walks past an ambulance which is assisting a woman on a stretcher, putting her hand on the woman's forehead. This referenced the July 2018 overdose that she suffered. Near the end of the music video, a bride and a groom run across the street, which referenced the engagement of Lovato's ex-boyfriend Wilmer Valderrama. The video ends with Lovato reuniting with two of her real-life friends, rapper Sirah and actor Matthew Scott Montgomery.

=== Lyric videos ===
A lyric video of the song was released on March 10, 2020, which shows footage of New York City, including the original World Trade Center building. Describing the visuals of the lyric video, Billboard said Lovato "uses vintage New York City shots to craft her self-love narrative" and that Lovato "transports the viewers right into the hustle and bustle of the city, plopping them in the middle of foot traffic where it's easy to feel small."

A lyric video for the Emo remix was released on May 7, 2020. It features a social media platform that mimics Myspace, the largest platform from 2005 to 2008, with the lyrics written as messages from Lovato and Travis Barker. It also shows a background of a broken heart that is covered in bandages and crowned, with lyrics written in hot pink and white. The video starts and ends with a stereotypical "emo" boy wearing black eyeliner, with black hair and clothes and piercings, who accesses the Myspace-reminiscent pages on his laptop.

=== TikTok video ===
Lovato released a TikTok compilation video of the song on her YouTube channel on April 24, 2020.

== Live performances ==
During the COVID-19 pandemic, Lovato performed the song in an at-home edition of The Tonight Show Starring Jimmy Fallon on March 31, 2020.

== Commercial performance ==
Upon release, the music video for "I Love Me" amassed 16.1 million views in its first week on YouTube, which placed it at number 22 on the global YouTube music videos chart. 4.9 million views of the 16.1 million global views were from the United States, which ultimately placed it at number five on the US Music Videos Chart. The song debuted at number 18 on the Billboard Hot 100, becoming Lovato's ninth top 20 hit on the chart and her highest debut since the release of her song "Heart Attack" in 2013. "I Love Me" was also the best-selling song of its release week, becoming Lovato's second number 1 on the Digital Song Sales Chart after her first number 1 with the release of "Anyone". On June 30, 2020, "I Love Me" was certified as Gold by the Recording Industry Association of America (RIAA).

== Accolades ==
Year	Organization	Award	Result	Ref.
2020	MTV Europe Music Awards	Video for Good	Nominated	
2020	MTV Video Music Awards	Video for Good	Nominated	
2020	MTV Video Music Awards	Best Visual Effects	Nominated	
2020	MTV Millennial Awards Brazil	Global Hit	Nominated	

== Track listing ==
- Digital download
1. "I Love Me" – 3:24
- Digital download – Zac Samuel remix
1. "I Love Me" (Zac Samuel remix) – 3:46
- Digital download – Emo version
1. "I Love Me" (featuring Travis Barker) (Emo version) – 3:24
- Limited LP – Urban Outfitters exclusive

Side A: "I Love Me" – 3:24
Side B: "Still Have Me" – 3:23

== Credits and personnel ==
Credits adapted from Tidal.

- Demi Lovato – lead vocals, backing vocals, songwriter
- Alex Niceforo – producer, songwriter, programmer, backing vocals, drums
- Keith Sorrells – producer, songwriter, programmer, engineer, backing vocals, drums, keyboards
- Oak Felder – producer, songwriter, programmer, bass guitar, drums, keyboards
- Anne-Marie – songwriter
- Jennifer Decilveo – songwriter, backing vocals
- Sean Douglas – songwriter, backing vocals
- Emerson Mancini – mastering engineer

== Charts ==
Chart performance for "I Love Me"
Chart (2020)	Peak position
Australia (ARIA)	73
Austria (Ö3 Austria Top 40)	60
Belgium (Ultratip Bubbling Under Flanders)	11
Canada (Canadian Hot 100)	30
Czech Republic (Rádio – Top 100)	72
Czech Republic (Singles Digitál Top 100)	47
Euro Digital Songs (Billboard)	10
France (SNEP Sales Chart)	29
Hungary (Single Top 40)	4
Hungary (Stream Top 40)	40
Germany (GfK)	89
Greece International Digital (IFPI Greece)	53
Ireland (IRMA)	30
Lithuania (AGATA)	60
Netherlands (Single Top 100)	93
New Zealand Hot Singles (RMNZ)	4
Portugal (AFP)	64
Scotland Singles (OCC)	13
Slovakia (Singles Digitál Top 100)	56
Switzerland (Schweizer Hitparade)	65
UK Singles (OCC)	35
US Billboard Hot 100	18
US Adult Pop Airplay (Billboard)	16
US Pop Airplay (Billboard)	12

== Certifications ==
Certifications for "I Love Me"
Region	Certification	Certified units/sales
Australia (ARIA)	Gold	35,000^{‡}
Brazil (Pro-Música Brasil)	2× Platinum	80,000^{‡}
United States (RIAA)	Platinum	1,000,000^{‡}
^{‡} Sales+streaming figures based on certification alone.

== Release history ==
Release formats for "I Love Me"
Region	Date	Format	Version(s)	Label	Ref.
Various	March 6, 2020	Digital download; streaming	Original	Island	
Italy	March 6, 2020	Contemporary hit radio	Original	Island	
United States	March 9, 2020	Hot adult contemporary radio	Original	Island; Republic	
United States	March 10, 2020	Contemporary hit radio	Original	Island; Republic	
Various	April 9, 2020	Digital download; streaming	Zac Samuel remix	Island	
Various	May 6, 2020	Digital download; streaming	Emo version	Island	
Various	February 5, 2021	LP	Urban Outfitters exclusive	Island	
