= Eye-rolling =

Facial expression showing disrespect or contempt

Emoji illustrating eye-rolling

Eye-rolling is a gesture in which a person briefly turns their eyes upward, often in an arcing motion from one side to the other. In the Anglosphere, it has been identified as a passive-aggressive response to an undesirable situation or person. The gesture is used to disagree or dismiss or express contempt for the targeted person without physical contact.

== History ==
Eye-rolling has been present in literature since at least the reign of Augustus, appearing in book 12, line 939 of Vergil's Aeneid, "... volvens oculos...". William Shakespeare periodically would use the gesture in his works to portray lust or passion for another character, as used in his poem The Rape of Lucrece.

== In society ==
Someone rolling their eyes

Eye-rolling is one of the most common forms of non-verbal communication among humans. A study of teenage girls in the eastern US found the eye-roll gesture to be their most common expression of displeasure. Thirteen-year-old girls use eye-rolling as the main sign of aggression towards their peers in social situations. Eye-rolling is often accompanied by crossing of the arms and throwing the head or body back in an increased effort to symbolise avoidance or displeasure.

A study conducted by John Gottman states that contemptuous behaviours like eye-rolling is the top factor of predicting divorce, followed by criticism, defensiveness, and stonewalling.

In 2010, members of the city council of Elmhurst, Illinois, wished to make a law outlawing eye-rolling.

== Evolution ==
There has been much speculation about the hypothesis that eye-rolling is an evolutionary trait of women, which would explain why it is performed more by women than their male counterparts. Psychologists suggest that it was developed as "a low-risk way to express aggression and disapproval". Women in the past were more motivated to use survival tactics that did not involve physical violence in conflict including cut-eye, or side-eye, likely related to maternal instincts. The action of looking away in rejection or disapproval has been traced to many different cultures, who use eye-rolling for similar purposes, suggesting that it is a somewhat innate reaction to unpleasant stimuli.

== Unicode emoji ==
In Unicode the eye roll emoji is U+1F644 🙄 FACE WITH ROLLING EYES, which has been added in Unicode 8.0.

== See also ==
- List of gestures
