= Commander in Chief (song) =

2020 single by Demi Lovato

Single by Demi Lovato
- Released: October 14, 2020
- Genre: Pop; political; protest
- Length: 3:14
- Label: Island
- Songwriters: Demi Lovato; Eren Cannata; Justin Tranter; Julia Michaels; Finneas
- Producers: Finneas; Eren Cannata

Demi Lovato singles chronology
"Still Have Me" (2020)	"Commander in Chief" (2020)	"Monsters" (2020)

Music video
- "Commander in Chief" on YouTube

"Commander in Chief" is a song by American singer Demi Lovato. She co-wrote the track with Justin Tranter, Julia Michaels, and its producers Finneas and Eren Cannata. The song was released as a single by Island Records on October 14, 2020. Its lyrics are directed towards then U.S. President Donald Trump, and are a response to the 2020 United States presidential election. An accompanying video was released on the same day.

== Background and composition ==
In an interview with CNN, Lovato asserts she wrote the song's lyrics to President Trump, specifically calling out his "mishandling of racial injustice, white supremacy, the COVID-19 pandemic, and the dismantling of LGBTQ rights." Lovato says the song began with a recurring desire for her to write the President a letter or set up a meeting with him to ask him the questions posed by the song, but that she ultimately decided to write a song instead and release it so that everyone would be able to share the confrontation and demand "answers" as well. In the song, Lovato asks, "Do you even know the truth? / We're in a state of crisis / People are dying / While you line your pockets deep / Commander in Chief / How does it feel / To still be able to breathe?" Moreover, Lovato says that she does not wish to divide the nation further politically with the song, but hopes it instead inspires conversation and increases voter turnout.

== Release ==
The full song had leaked prior to release on October 11, 2020. A few days later, on October 13, Lovato began to tease the song by posting a few clips of the upcoming music video to her Instagram page, featuring a young Black girl and an older White man mouthing the lyrics. The cover of the single also shows Lovato wearing a face mask that reads "VOTE". The singer, who has been outspoken about her political beliefs in the past, announced that the song had been released later that night on October 14, with a post captioned "I'm calling on all of you, please join me in voting for this years election. Find your voter information at iwillvote.com".

== Music videos ==
The music video for the song was released on October 14, 2020, and was directed by Director X. It features diverse Americans of different genders, races, sexual orientations, and ability groups lip-syncing the song before Lovato appears and performs the final moments of the song. The Lincoln Project, a group composed mainly of Republicans against Trump, teamed up with Lovato to release an alternative music video that displays a montage of images of people suffering, with shots of people detained at border detention centers, COVID-19 hospitalizations, and Black Lives Matter protests.

== Live performance ==
Lovato performed the song live for the first time at the 2020 Billboard Music Awards ceremony, where she sang the song while playing piano.

== Critical reception ==
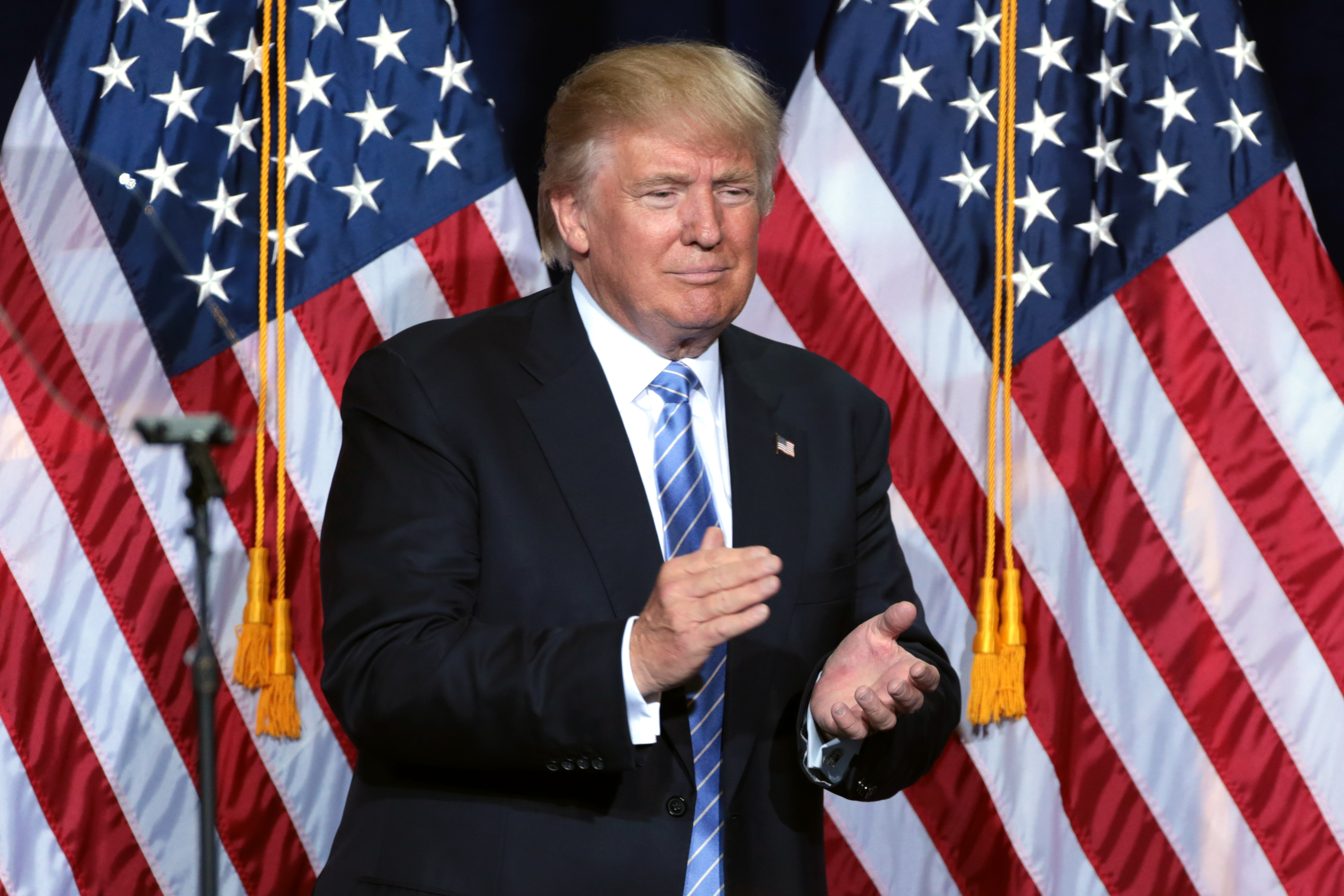
The lyrics to "Commander in Chief" directly challenge and spurn then-U.S. President Donald Trump (pictured).

Vulture praised the song in how it not only portrays the emotions spurred by the presidency of Donald Trump, but also encourages listeners to "fight for what's right" and "stand our ground", which includes voting in the forthcoming election. Moreover, they noted that the song is more than just a "callout to President Donald Trump and all his violent ineptitude", but is also "a reminder that his critics are not going to back down." Meanwhile, Billboard reported that "Make America United Again" is Lovato's aim with her "powerful, politically driven new song" given the lyrics of the song and the visuals of its accompanying music video.

Dorian Lynskey of The Guardian hailed the song as "the most damning protest song of the Trump era", saying it has "intense potency" and praising Lovato for being the first artist to challenge Trump directly in her lyrics. The review compared the song to a ballad about heartbreak, saying that it is one in a way, as it "expresses the emotional pain of the Trump era", while also being particularly tailored to the year 2020, as the song references contemporary events including the 2020 protests over racial injustice, and because the hook of the chorus ("How does it feel to still be able to breathe?") is seen to be directly addressing Trump in relation to "both Covid-19, which has killed more than 215,000 Americans on Trump's watch, and the Black Lives Matter slogan 'I can't breathe'". The song was also compared to past political and protest songs – "Dear Mr. President", "What's Going On", and Crass's 1982 anti-Margaret Thatcher song "How Does It Feel to Be the Mother of a Thousand Dead" – but Lynskey wrote that Lovato introduces something new to the protest song genre with her "aching, melismatic pop ballad".

== Personnel ==
- Demi Lovato – lead vocals
- Michael Bethany – background vocals
- Eren Cannata – production, background vocals, keyboards, recording
- Darian Elliott – background vocals
- Finneas – production, background vocals, bass, drums, keyboards, organ, percussion, piano, programming, recording
- Kirk Franklin – choir arrangement
- Godfrey Furchtgott – strings
- Serban Ghenea – mixing
- John Hanes – mixing engineering
- Michael Havens – recording
- Randy Merrill – mastering
- Julia Michaels – background vocals
- Melodie Pace – background vocals
- Justin Tranter – background vocals
- The Vocal Resource Group – vocals

Credits adapted from Tidal.

== Charts ==
Chart (2020)	Peak position
France (SNEP Sales Chart)	109
New Zealand Hot Singles (RMNZ)	13
Scottish Singles Sales (Official Charts)	95
UK Singles Sales (Official Charts)	85
US Digital Song Sales (Billboard)	18

== See also ==
- Protest songs in the United States
