= OK Not to Be OK =

2020 single by Marshmello and Demi Lovato

Single by Marshmello and Demi Lovato
- Released: September 10, 2020
- Genre: Dance-pop
- Length: 2:39
- Label: Island; Joytime Collective; Republic
- Songwriters: Demi Lovato; Gregory Hein; James Gutch; James Nicholas Bailey; Marshmello
- Producer: Marshmello

Marshmello singles chronology
"Baggin'" (2020)	"OK Not to Be OK" (2020)	"Too Much" (2020)

Demi Lovato singles chronology
"I'm Ready" (2020)	"OK Not to Be OK" (2020)	"Still Have Me" (2020)

Music video
- "OK Not to Be OK" on YouTube

"OK Not to Be OK" is an EDM and dance pop song by American music producer Marshmello and singer Demi Lovato. It was released on September 10, 2020, via Island Records and Joytime Collective, in partnership with the Hope For The Day suicide prevention movement. The song was later included on the expanded edition of Lovato's seventh studio album Dancing with the Devil... the Art of Starting Over.

== Background and promotion ==
The song was teased various times by Marshmello through his social media accounts; shortly prior to its release, in July 2020, he liked fan tweets confirming the track and also captioned an Instagram photo "hello? demi?", before later removing Lovato's name from the caption. The image showed Marshmello on the phone in a dark room with an overturned lamp, bottles of alcohol and a mystery woman in the background – critics attributed this as a possible reference to the theme of the song; however, the aesthetic was later confirmed to be for Marshmello's previous single, "Baggin'".

A few weeks later, on September 4, both artists announced the collaboration, with Marshmello posting a video of him scrolling through his Twitter timeline, reading tweets of fans jokingly threatening to toast him unless he releases the song. Lovato reposted the tweet, with a link to a 90s-inspired website, which included the release date and an interactive mood quiz, a Minesweeper game and a music playlist. The song is not the only recording between the two; in 2017, a track titled "Love Don't Let Me Go" was registered to ASCAP, crediting Marshmello and Lovato, but is yet to be released.

== Music videos ==
In August 2020, Marshmello and Lovato were seen on the set of a music video. The video was directed by Hannah Lux Davis, who has directed many of Lovato and Marshmello's past music videos.

The video takes place in a suburban neighborhood where Lovato and Marshmello both wake up in bedrooms that belong to the younger versions of themselves. Lovato and her younger version both trash the bedroom, cutting between scenes of older Lovato singing in the center. Everyone eventually strolls around their neighborhood while singing and dancing to the song, and while Marshmello rolls around the front yard and rides his bike. The video ends with information about "Hope for the Day" and resources for suicide prevention.

A music video for the Duke & Jones remix of the song was released on October 2, 2020.

=== Credits and personnel ===
Credits adapted from YouTube.

- Hannah Lux Davis – director and editor
- Aaron Johnson – producer
- Brandon Bonfiglio – producer
- Carlos Veron – director of photography
- Erin Wysocki – editor
- London Alley – production company

== Credits and personnel ==
Credits adapted from Tidal.

- Marshmello – production, keyboards, programming
- Demi Lovato – songwriting, vocals
- Gregory Hein – songwriting
- James Gutch – songwriting
- James Nicholas Bailey – songwriting
- Mitch Allan – engineering, vocal production
- Emerson Mancini – mastering
- Manny Marroquin – mixing

== Charts ==
=== Weekly charts ===
Chart (2020)	Peak position
Australia (ARIA)	47
Belgium (Ultratip Bubbling Under Flanders)	1
Canada Hot 100 (Billboard)	41
Croatia (HRT)	23
Czech Republic Airplay (ČNS IFPI)	23
El Salvador (Monitor Latino)	13
Global 200 (Billboard)	32
Greece (IFPI)	91
Hungary (Single Top 40)	20
Ireland (IRMA)	43
Japan Hot Overseas (Billboard)	17
Lithuania (AGATA)	56
New Zealand Hot Singles (RMNZ)	4
Portugal (AFP)	109
San Marino (SMRRTV Top 50)	44
Scottish Singles Sales (Official Charts)	27
Slovakia Airplay (ČNS IFPI)	48
Sweden (Sverigetopplistan)	72
Switzerland (Schweizer Hitparade)	51
UK Singles (Official Charts)	42
US Billboard Hot 100	36
US Adult Contemporary (Billboard)	26
US Adult Pop Airplay (Billboard)	20
US Hot Dance/Electronic Songs (Billboard)	2
US Pop Airplay (Billboard)	22
US Rolling Stone Top 100	22

=== Year-end charts ===
Chart (2020)	Position
US Hot Dance/Electronic Songs (Billboard)	14
Chart (2021)	Position
US Hot Dance/Electronic Songs (Billboard)	23

== Certifications ==
Region	Certification	Certified units/sales
Brazil (Pro-Música Brasil)	2× Platinum	80,000^{‡}
New Zealand (RMNZ)	Gold	15,000^{‡}
^{‡} Sales+streaming figures based on certification alone.

== Release history ==
Region	Date	Format(s)	Version(s)	Label(s)	Ref.
Various	September 10, 2020	Digital download; streaming	Original	Island; Joytime Collective	
Australia	September 11, 2020	Contemporary hit radio	Original	Universal	
Italy	September 14, 2020	Contemporary hit radio	Original	Universal	
United States	September 15, 2020	Contemporary hit radio	Original	Island; Republic	
Various	October 2, 2020	Digital download; streaming	Duke & Jones Remix	Island; Joytime Collective	
Various	October 22, 2020	Digital download; streaming	Lost Stories Remix	Island; Joytime Collective	
