= Cut-eye =

Facial gesture indicating disapproval

Cut-eye is a visual gesture using one's eyes and face to communicate displeasure or disapproval, and in some cases hostility. The gesture is usually performed by looking at someone out of the corners of one's eyes, then turning the eyes away quickly down towards the foot opposite the eye of the person the gesture is being performed at. The main focus of this gesture is the "cut" of the eyes, and can be performed by moving them in one direction or several sharp up and down movements, meant to convey a feeling of anger or disapproval. This gesture has evolved into popular culture and has taken on new monikers while remaining similar to the original African gesture. The cut-eye gesture now is also identified with: stink-eye, evil-look, eye-roll, or death stare. The gesture also is similar in nature to the evil-eye gesture of the Christian and Islamic theologies.

== Uses ==
The action of performing cut-eye is commonly associated with the suck-teeth gesture and a neck roll for maximum effect. In media depictions, the people who perform the neck roll are usually also portrayed as loud, tough, argumentative, and even combative. Cut-eye is used primarily to depict power over another person who has done something wrong or to the user's displeasure. The use of the cut-eye gesture is meant to send a feeling of anger or disgust without verbally communicating the same sentiment. The cut-eye gesture can be done with or without the knowledge of the recipient and has different meanings in each context. When done directly to the recipient of the gesture, the cut-eye conveys direct anger, disappointment, and disapproval. When done without the knowledge of the recipient, the cut-eye gesture can convey the same message but with the desire to have the sentiment remain unknown due to fear of the recipient or general lack of desire to verbally or blatantly portray anger.

Cut-eye makes its full effect when the eyes of the person performing the gesture are turned the opposite direction from the person to which it is intended for. This sends the message that they aren't worth the attention. The gesture is used in many cases, most typically when a person is talking and is interrupted by another individual. In this case, a sharp cut-eye is given in order to show the level of anger and disrespect felt by the user. In addition, it shows the perceived irrelevancy of the individual who interrupted. It also gives the person to which the gesture is intended the same feeling of disrespect of anger the user of the gesture felt. By "rummaging" one's eyes over a person, one violates their personal space and sense of confidence. The victim cannot do anything in this situation to prevent this violation.

== Origins ==
=== Africa ===
In Africa, the origin of the cut-eye gesture is the region in and around the modern-day countries of Ghana and Nigeria. In this region, the gesture began as a show of anger and conflict between two individuals and could be used with the intent of the onset of combat or without said intent.

=== Europe and the Middle East ===
In Europe, the origin of the cut-eye gesture is centered around the gesture of evil-eye in the context of its biblical references. The original form in Europe and the Middle East was far more serious than the nature of the gesture in the African setting as in the theologies of Europe and the Middle East, the gesture was believed to carry a supernatural power. In the Eurasian context, the cut-eye or evil-eye gesture would bring bad omens upon the recipient and was believed to bring sickness, curses, and possibly death; as a result the use of the evil-eye gesture could often lead to banishment or Eurasian version of the gesture is most represented in modern culture by the potential offense upon receiving the cut-eye, but also shows in the large range of severity the gesture can carry.

== Translations ==
The visual gesture of cut-eye is found in many Ghanaian languages, including translations in Akan, Ga, and Ewe.

- Akan – anikyibuo / anikyie 'the art of breaking the back of the eye'
- Ga – o-kpâ-mi 'you cut-eye me'
- Ewe – treåku 'seal eyes'

== See also ==
- List of gestures
- Nonverbal communication
