= Still Have Me =

2020 single by Demi Lovato

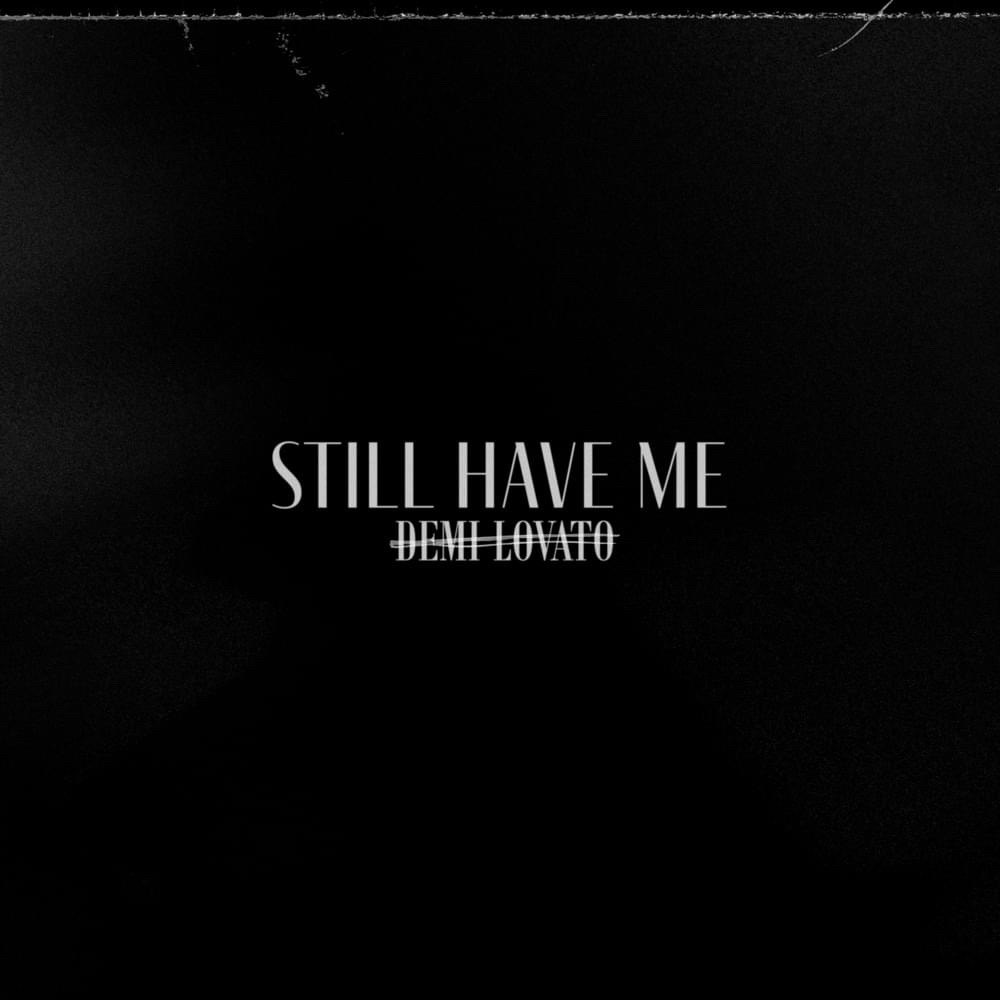

Single by Demi Lovato
- A-side: "I Love Me"
- Released: September 30, 2020
- Genre: Pop
- Length: 3:23
- Label: Island
- Songwriters: Demi Lovato; Chloe Angelides; Sean Myer
- Producers: Chloe Angelides; Sean Myer

Demi Lovato singles chronology
| "OK Not to Be OK" (2020) | "Still Have Me" (2020) | "Commander in Chief" (2020) |

Audio video
- "Still Have Me" on YouTube

"Still Have Me" is a song by American singer Demi Lovato. She co-wrote the track with its producers Chloe Angelides and Sean Myer. The song was released as a single by Island Records on September 30, 2020. Its lyrics involve self-love, enduring hardships and healing.

== Background ==
In July 2019, the song's co-writer Chloe Angelides posted a short snippet of the song on Instagram. Further details were revealed when a fan who reposted the snippet on Twitter received a copyright takedown notice filed by the IFPI, which identified the song as a Lovato track called "Still Got Me", registered by Universal Music Group.

On September 24, 2020, it was reported that Lovato had broken up with then-fiancé, actor Max Ehrich, two months after Ehrich proposed to her, ending their six-month relationship and calling off their engagement. According to TMZ, Lovato wrote "Still Have Me" with her friends "a while ago", but after her split from Ehrich, she changed the lyrics to reflect the breakup, while retaining the hook of the song. Citing unnamed sources connected to Lovato, TMZ reported that she became so increasingly frustrated with Ehrich's recent behavior, such as drawing comparisons between the breakup and Jeffrey Epstein, that she did not want to wait to release the song.

== Release ==
On September 29, Lovato teased an upcoming release in a tweet, writing: "Music is always there for me... song in the am", before posting a screenshot of her tweet on Instagram. On September 30, Lovato released the song on Instagram and Twitter as a video which contains the single artwork and the song's full audio. In the social media posts, she repeated the same sentence from the earlier tweet: "Music is always there for me..."

However, the song was not made available on digital download and streaming services such as Apple Music and Spotify immediately afterwards. After Lovato released the song, her manager Scooter Braun replied to her Instagram post: "Now let's just get it up on streamers", with a Smiling Face with Open Mouth and Cold Sweat emoji. YouTube records show that the song's audio was uploaded to the site almost ten hours later, while Lovato announced general availability on all platforms over 14 hours after the initial release. When asked on Twitter about the delayed release on streaming platforms, Braun wrote in a reply: "Working on it lol. She didn't give us a lot of time on this one." He was also asked why he would let his client "leak her own song like that", to which he replied: "Music is for the soul. Her soul needed to speak. Not for me to get in the way of." TMZ reported that Lovato "blindsided her team" by releasing the song on her own. According to sources with direct knowledge on the matter, after the premature release, her team "scrambled" to make the single available on music platforms, so as to allow her fans to purchase it and collect streaming numbers.

== Composition ==
"Still Have Me" is a pop ballad about self-loving and empowerment in the face of devastation and hardship, with a soft piano melody throughout the track. It has a length of three minutes and twenty-three seconds. The track is thematically similar to "I Love Me", a song released by Lovato in March 2020, while having a more somber tone instead of being upbeat and high-energy. It has also been compared to some of Lovato's previous tracks that reveal her vulnerability, such as "Anyone" and "Skyscraper". "Still Have Me" is believed to be about the end of Lovato's engagement to Max Ehrich and their relationship shortly before the song's release. While not directly referencing the breakup, its lyrics explore a person's mind during a difficult time, having experienced a fall from a high point in life, but still possessing the strength and a strong will to overcome obstacles by oneself, and attempts to go through the process of healing.

== Track listing ==
- Digital download and streaming
1. "Still Have Me" – 3:23
- Limited LP – Urban Outfitters exclusive

Side A: "I Love Me" – 3:23
Side B: "Still Have Me" – 3:23

== Personnel ==
Credits adapted from Tidal and YouTube.

- Chloe Angelides – production, background vocals, keyboards, programming
- Sean Myer – production, background vocals, guitar, keyboard, programming, recording engineering
- Randy Merrill – master engineering, recording engineering
- Andrew Wuepper – mixing
- Mitch Allan – recording engineering

== Charts ==
| Chart (2020) | Peak position |
|---|---|
| Canada Digital Song Sales (Billboard) | 43 |
| France (SNEP Sales Chart) | 75 |
| New Zealand Hot Singles (RMNZ) | 30 |
| Scottish Singles Sales (Official Charts) | 66 |
| UK Singles Sales (Official Charts) | 75 |
| US Digital Song Sales (Billboard) | 16 |

== Certifications ==
Certifications and sales for "Still Have Me"
| Region | Certification | Certified units/sales |
|---|---|---|
| Brazil (Pro-Música Brasil) | Gold | 20,000^{‡} |
^{‡} Sales+streaming figures based on certification alone.

== Release history ==
| Region | Date | Format | Label | Ref. |
|---|---|---|---|---|
| Various | October 15, 2020 | Digital download; streaming | Island | |
| Various | February 5, 2021 | LP | Island | |
