= List of Demi Lovato live performances =

Demi Lovato live performances
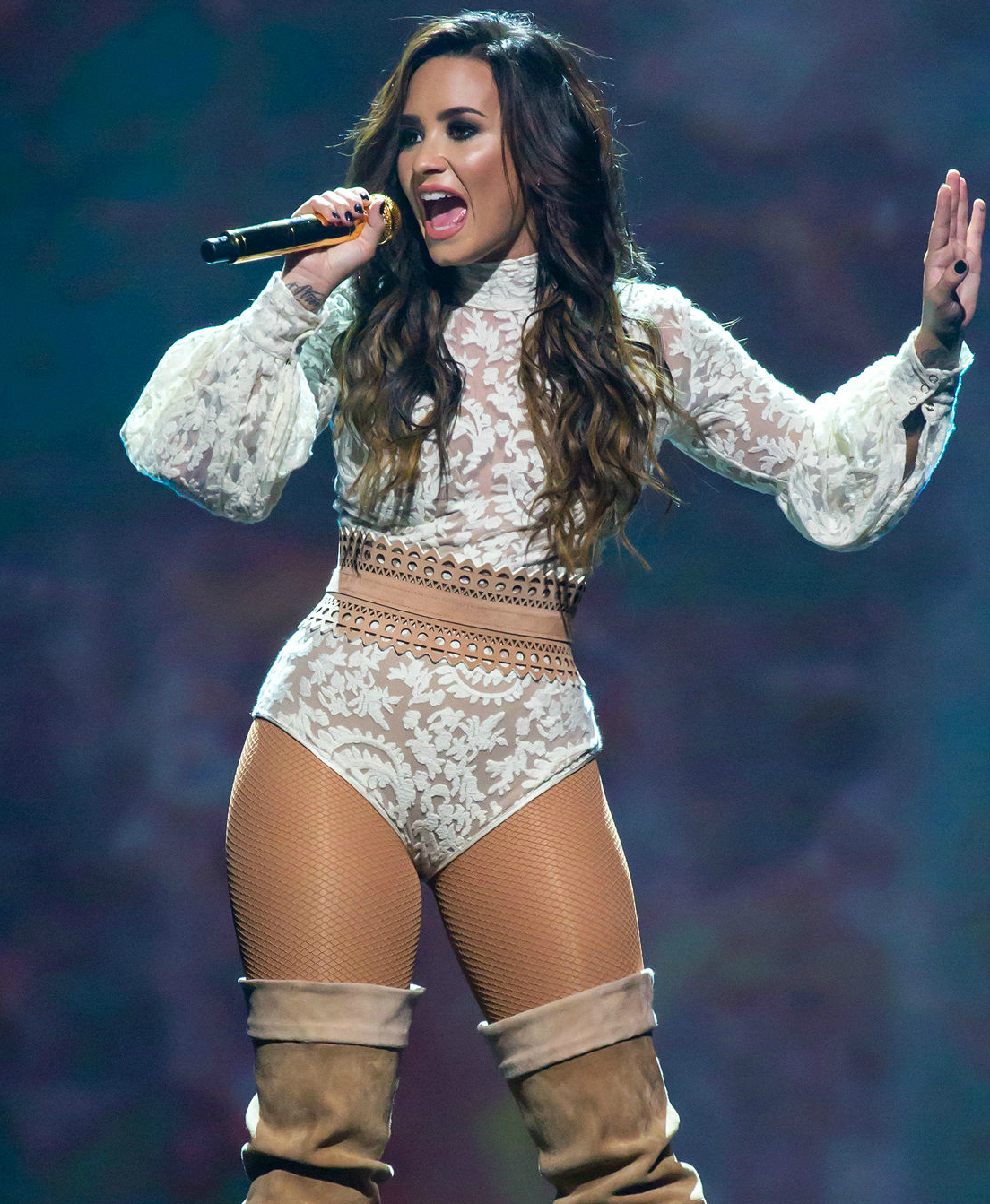
- Lovato performing on the Future Now Tour in 2016
- Concert tours: 6
- Co-headlining tours: 1
- Promotional tours: 1
- Music festivals: 43
- Live performances: 98

American singer Demi Lovato has released eight studio albums since her solo debut in 2008. This has resulted in six concert tours (five of them worldwide), and live TV and award shows performances. Her debut promotional tour in 2008, Demi Live! Warm Up Tour was based in North America only and supported her debut studio album, Don't Forget. At the same year, Lovato served as one of the opening acts for the Jonas Brothers on her fifth concert tour, Burnin' Up Tour and for Avril Lavigne on her third concert tour, The Best Damn World Tour on selected dates in North America.

In 2009, Lovato performed as the opening act on the Jonas Brothers World Tour 2009 during the South American and European legs, before she headlined her first tour, Demi Lovato: Live in Concert during Summer 2009. The tour was in support of Don't Forget and her second album Here We Go Again. In 2010, Lovato performed as the opening act on Jonas Brothers' Live in Concert World Tour 2010. On November 1, 2010, Lovato left the tour to receive professional help for personal issues.

During 2011 till 2013, Lovato embarked on her second headlining concert tour, A Special Night with Demi Lovato to promote her third studio album Unbroken. Lovato performed 68 shows and visited North America, South America, Asia and Europe, grossing over $47 million. In 2014, Lovato was named the Grand Marshall and headliner of Los Angeles Pride.

Lovato embarked on her third headlining concert tour, The Neon Lights Tour to promote her self-titled fourth studio album Demi. During the tour, Lovato performed 44 shows and visited North America, South America and Europe. To further promote Demi, Lovato embarked on her fourth headlining concert tour, Demi World Tour in 2014 till 2015. During most of the European tour dates in 2014, Lovato supported Spanish singer Enrique Iglesias on his twelfth concert tour Sex and Love Tour. In 2016, Lovato and American singer Nick Jonas embarked on her co-headlining concert tour Future Now Tour as part of the 15th Annual Honda Civic Tour visiting 41 cities in North America and Europe,

In 2018, Lovato embarked on her fifth headlining tour, Tell Me You Love Me World Tour in support of her sixth studio album, Tell Me You Love Me, visiting 43 cities in North America and Europe. According to Billboard Boxscore, the North American leg of the tour generated $20 million in ticket sales and played to 260,763 fans over 20 shows. The highest grossing show of the leg was at Brooklyn's Barclays Center, playing for 15,249 and grossing $1.5 million. Washington, D.C.'s Capital One Arena drew the largest crowd of the leg with a total of 16,141 tickets sold.

== Concert tours ==
Title	Dates	Associated album(s)	Continent(s)	Shows	Gross	Attendance	Ref.
Demi Lovato: Live in Concert	June 21, 2009 – May 28, 2010	Don't Forget; Here We Go Again	North America; South America	51	$11,500,000	152,862	
A Special Night with Demi Lovato	November 16, 2011 – March 27, 2013	Unbroken	North America; South America; Asia; Europe	68	$47,700,000	105,160	
The Neon Lights Tour	February 9, 2014 – June 16, 2014	Demi	North America; South America; Europe	42	$20,000,000	126,298	
Demi World Tour	September 6, 2014 – September 5, 2015	Demi	North America; Asia; Oceania; Europe	44	$28,000,000	182,315	
Tell Me You Love Me World Tour	February 26, 2018 – July 22, 2018	Tell Me You Love Me	North America; Europe	43	$41,000,000	285,093	
Holy Fvck Tour	August 30, 2022 – November 10, 2022	Holy Fvck	South America; North America	32	—N/a	—N/a	
It's Not That Deep Tour	April 13, 2026 – May 25, 2026	It's Not That Deep	North America	18	—N/a	—N/a	

== Co-headlining tours ==
Title	Dates	Associated album(s)	Continent(s)	Shows	Gross	Attendance	Ref.
Future Now Tour (with Nick Jonas)	June 29, 2016 – October 19, 2016	Confident	North America; Europe	47	$35,000,000	280,045	

== Promotional tours ==
Title	Dates	Associated album(s)	Continent(s)	Shows	Ref.
Demi Live! Warm Up Tour	June 1, 2008 – December 21, 2008	Don't Forget	North America	21	

== Festival appearances ==
Date	Festival	City	Performed song(s)	Ref.
July 6, 2008	Summerfest	Milwaukee, Wisconsin, United States	"That's How You Know"; "La La Land"; "Gonna Get Caught"; "Daydream"; "Until You're Mine"; "Party"; "Two Worlds Collide"; "Don't Forget"; "Get Back"	
August 29, 2008	New York State Fair	Syracuse, New York, United States	"That's How You Know"; "La La Land"; "Trainwreck"; "Gonna Get Caught"; "Until You're Mine"; "Party"; "Two Worlds Collide"; "Don't Forget"; "Get Back"	
August 30, 2008	Great Allentown Fair	Allentown, Pennsylvania, United States	"That's How You Know"; "La La Land"; "Trainwreck"; "Gonna Get Caught"; "Until You're Mine"; "Party"; "Two Worlds Collide"; "Don't Forget"; "Get Back"	
September 14, 2008	Concert for Hope	Universal City, California, United States	"That's How You Know"; "La La Land"; "Daydream"; "Gonna Get Caught"; "Until You're Mine"; "Party"; "Two Worlds Collide"; "Don't Forget"; "Get Back"	
May 3, 2009	The Bamboozle	East Rutherford, New Jersey, United States	"La La Land"; "Gonna Get Caught"; "Party"; "Until You're Mine"; "Trainwreck"; "Don't Forget"; "Get Back"	
October 25, 2009	Concert for Hope	Los Angeles, California, United States	"La La Land"; "U Got Nothin' on Me"; "Trainwreck"; "Catch Me"; "Solo"; "Stop the World"; "Remember December"; "Here We Go Again"; "Don't Forget"; "Get Back"	
October 21, 2011	Z100's Jingle Ball	New York City, United States	"Catch Me"; "Don't Forget"; "My Love is Like a Star"; "How to Love"; "Skyscraper"	
February 4, 2012	Festival de Iquique	Iquique, Chile	"All Night Long"; "Got Dynamite"; "Catch Me"; "Don't Forget"; "My Love Is Like a Star"; "Fix a Heart"; "Get Back"; "Here We Go Again"; "La La Land"; "Lightweight"; "Skyscraper"; "Moves like Jagger"; "Together"; "Give Your Heart a Break"; "Remember December"; "Unbroken"	
March 2, 2012	Florida Strawberry Festival	Plant City, Florida, United States	—N/a	
March 4, 2012	Borderfest	Hidalgo, Texas, United States	—N/a	
March 13, 2012	Rodeo Austin	Austin, Texas, United States	"All Night Long"; "Got Dynamite"; "Catch Me" / "Don't Forget"; "My Love Is Like a Star"; "Fix a Heart"; "Get Back" / "Here We Go Again" / "La La Land"; "Lightweight"; "Skyscraper"; "Moves like Jagger"; "Together"; "Give Your Heart a Break"; "Unbroken"; "Remember December"	
June 12, 2012	San Diego County Fair	Del Mar, California, United States	"All Night Long"; "Got Dynamite"; "Hold Up"; "Get Back"; "Catch Me" / "Don't Forget"; "My Love Is Like a Star"; "Fix a Heart"; "How to Love"; "American Honey"; "Who's That Boy"; "You're My Only Shorty"; "Here We Go Again" / "La La Land"; "Lightweight"; "Skyscraper"; "Together"; "Remember December"; "Give Your Heart a Break"; "Unbroken"	
August 4, 2012	Ravinia Festival	Highland Park, Illinois, United States	"All Night Long"; "Got Dynamite"; "Hold Up"; "Get Back"; "Catch Me" / "Don't Forget"; "My Love Is Like a Star"; "Fix a Heart"; "How to Love"; "American Honey"; "Who's That Boy"; "You're My Only Shorty"; "Here We Go Again" / "La La Land"; "Lightweight"; "Skyscraper"; "Turn Up the Music"; "Together"; "Remember December"; "Unbroken"; "Give Your Heart a Break"	
August 11, 2012	Illinois State Fair	Springfield, Illinois, United States	"All Night Long"; "Got Dynamite"; "Hold Up"; "Get Back"; "Catch Me" / "Don't Forget"; "My Love Is Like a Star"; "Fix a Heart"; "How to Love"; "American Honey"; "Who's That Boy"; "You're My Only Shorty"; "Here We Go Again" / "La La Land"; "Lightweight"; "Skyscraper"; "Turn Up the Music"; "Together"; "Remember December"; "Unbroken"; "Give Your Heart a Break"	
August 28, 2012	Minnesota State Fair	Saint Paul, Minnesota, United States	"All Night Long"; "Got Dynamite"; "Hold Up"; "Get Back"; "Catch Me" / "Don't Forget"; "My Love Is Like a Star"; "Fix a Heart"; "The House That Built Me"; "Who's That Boy"; "Here We Go Again" / "La La Land"; "Skyscraper"; "Turn Up the Music"; "Together"; "Remember December"; "Give Your Heart a Break"	
August 30, 2012	Evergreen State Fair	Monroe, Washington, United States	"All Night Long"; "Got Dynamite"; "Hold Up"; "Get Back"; "Catch Me" / "Don't Forget"; "My Love Is Like a Star"; "Fix a Heart"; "The House That Built Me"; "Who's That Boy"; "Here We Go Again" / "La La Land"; "Skyscraper"; "Turn Up the Music"; "Together"; "Remember December"; "Give Your Heart a Break"	
September 1, 2012	Oregon State Fair	Salem, Oregon, United States	"All Night Long"; "Got Dynamite"; "Hold Up"; "Get Back"; "Catch Me" / "Don't Forget"; "My Love Is Like a Star"; "Fix a Heart"; "The House That Built Me"; "Who's That Boy"; "Here We Go Again" / "La La Land"; "Skyscraper"; "Turn Up the Music"; "Together"; "Remember December"; "Give Your Heart a Break"	
September 29, 2012	Z Festival	São Paulo, Brazil	"All Night Long"; "Got Dynamite"; "Get Back"; "Hold Up"; "Catch Me" / "Don't Forget"; "My Love Is Like a Star"; "Fix a Heart"; "Here We Go Again" / "La La Land"; "Skyscraper"; "Turn Up the Music"; "Remember December"; "Give Your Heart a Break"	
September 30, 2012	Z Festival	Rio de Janeiro, Brazil	"All Night Long"; "Got Dynamite"; "Hold Up"; "Get Back"; "Catch Me" / "Don't Forget"; "My Love Is Like a Star"; "Fix a Heart"; "Here We Go Again" / "La La Land"; "Skyscraper"; "Turn Up the Music"; "Remember December"; "Give Your Heart a Break"	
March 3, 2013	Houston Rodeo	Houston, Texas, United States	"Here We Go Again"; "La La Land"; "Get Back"; "My Love is Like a Star"; "Fix a Heart"; "The House That Built Me"; "Skyscraper"; "Heart Attack"; "Give Your Heart a Break"	
March 22, 2013	Twin Towers @Live	Kuala Lumpur, Malaysia	"Unbroken"; "Get Back"; "Here We Go Again"; "La La Land"; "Don't Forget"; "My Love Is Like a Star"; "American Honey"; "The House That Built Me"; "Fix a Heart"; "Catch Me"; "Lightweight"; "Skyscraper"; "Turn Up the Music"; "Heart Attack"; "Remember December"; "Give Your Heart a Break"	
May 18, 2013	Kiss 108 Concert	Mansfield, Massachusetts, United States	"Heart Attack", "Made in the USA", "Get Back" / "La La Land", "Really Don't Care" (First time performing the song live. Featured artist Cher Lloyd had performed her own set earlier and joined Demi onstage for this song.), "Don't Forget", "Stay" (Rihanna cover), "Skyscraper" (dedicates performance to nearby Boston, the Boston Marathon Bombing had occurred just a month earlier), "Give Your Heart a Break"	
September 1, 2013	Festival People en Español	San Antonio, Texas, United States	"Heart Attack"; "Made in the USA"; "Get Back" / "La La Land"; "Don't Forget"; "Fire Starter"; "Something That We're Not"; "Nightingale"; "Really Don't Care"; "Neon Lights"; "Stay"; "Skyscraper"; "Give Your Heart a Break"	
April 14, 2014	iHeartRadio Live	Los Angeles, California, United States	"Heart Attack"; "Really Don't Care"; "Fire Starter"; "Skyscraper"; "Give Your Heart a Break"; "Neon Lights"; "Give Me Love"; "Catch Me"; "Here We Go Again"; "Made in the USA"; "Don't Forget"; "Warrior"; "Unbroken"; "Let It Go"	
July 20, 2014	California Mid-State Fair	Paso Robles, California, United States	"Heart Attack"; "Remember December"; "Fire Starter"; "The Middle"; "Really Don't Care"; "Nightingale"; "Two Pieces"; "Warrior"; "Let It Go"; "Don't Forget"; "Got Dynamite"; "Neon Lights"; "Skyscraper"; "Give Your Heart a Break"	
October 8, 2014	Vevo Certified Superfanfest	Los Angeles, California, United States	"Neon Lights"; "Really Don't Care"; "Heart Attack"; "Give Your Heart a Break"; "Let It Go"; "Skyscraper"; "Catch Me" / "Don't Forget"; "My Love Is Like a Star"	
May 2, 2015	Changjiang International Music Festival	Zhenjiang, China	"Really Don't Care"; "The Middle"; "Fire Starter"; "Remember December"; "Heart Attack"; "My Love Is Like a Star"; "Get Back"; "Don't Forget" / "Catch Me"; "Let It Go"; "Warrior"; "Two Pieces"; "Nightingale"; "Got Dynamite"; "Skyscraper"; "Give Your Heart a Break"; "Neon Lights"	
June 6, 2015	DigiFest	New York City, New York, United States	"Really Don't Care"; "Heart Attack"; "Skyscraper"; "Give Your Heart a Break"; "Neon Lights"	
September 5, 2015	NRJ Music Tour	Saint-Quentin, France	"Cool for the Summer"; "Heart Attack"; "Neon Lights"	
September 18, 2015	iHeartRadio Music Festival	Las Vegas, Nevada, United States	"Cool for the Summer"; "Really Don't Care"; "Heart Attack"; "Give Your Heart a Break"; "Jumper" (with Stephan Jenkins); "Neon Lights"	
September 19, 2015	iHeartRadio Music Festival	Las Vegas, Nevada, United States	"Cool for the Summer"; "Really Don't Care"; "Heart Attack"; "Give Your Heart a Break"; "Jumper" (with Stephan Jenkins); "Neon Lights"	
October 24, 2015	We Can Survive	Los Angeles, California, United States	"Confident"; "For You"; "Stone Cold"; "Neon Lights"; "Cool for the Summer"	
May 14, 2016	Wango Tango	Carson, California, United States	"Confident"; "For You"; "Stone Cold"; "Yes"; "Neon Lights"; "Cool for the Summer"	
September 24, 2016	Global Citizen Festival	New York City, New York, United States	"Confident"; "For You"; "Stone Cold"; "(You Make Me Feel Like) A Natural Woman"; "Cool for the Summer"	
October 1, 2016	Expo 2016	Antalya, Turkey	"Confident"; "Heart Attack"; "Neon Lights"; "For You"; "Fire Starter"; "Got Dynamite"; "Body Say"; "Wildfire"; "My Love Is Like a Star"; "Fix a Heart"; "Nightingale"; "Warrior"; "Lionheart"; "Yes"; "Stone Cold"; "Skyscraper"; "(You Make Me Feel Like) A Natural Woman"; "When We Were Young"; "Give Your Heart a Break"; "Cool for the Summer"	
November 19, 2016	Global Citizen Festival	Mumbai, India	"Confident"; "Heart Attack"; "For You"; "Stone Cold"; "Cool for the Summer"	
December 10, 2016	Z Festival	São Paulo, Brazil	"Confident"; "Heart Attack"; "Neon Lights"; "Fire Starter"; "For You"; "Got Dynamite"; "Body Say"; "Wildfire"; "My Love Is Like a Star"; "Fix a Heart"; "Nightingale"/"Warrior"; "Lionheart"; "Old Ways"; "Kingdom Come"; "Catch Me"/"Don't Forget"; "Yes"; "Mr. Hughes"; "Stone Cold"; "Give Your Heart a Break"; "Skyscraper"; "Cool for the Summer"	
February 3, 2017	RedfestDXB	Dubai, United Arab Emirates	"Confident"; "Heart Attack"; "Neon Lights"; "Fire Starter"; "For You"; "Got Dynamite"; "Body Say"; "Wildfire"; "My Love Is Like a Star"; "Fix a Heart"; "Nightingale"; "Warrior"; "Lionheart"; "Old Ways"; "Kingdom Come"; "Stone Cold"; "Give Your Heart a Break"; "Skyscraper"; "Cool for the Summer"	
March 14, 2017	Houston Rodeo	Houston, Texas, United States	"Confident"; "Heart Attack"; "Got Dynamite"; "Fire Starter"; "For You"; "Wildfire"; "Body Say"; "Old Ways"; "Fix a Heart"/"Nightingale"/"Warrior"; "Lionheart"; "Stone Cold"; "(You Make Me Feel Like) A Natural Woman"; "Skyscraper"; "Neon Lights"; "Give Your Heart a Break"; "Cool for the Summer"	
May 19, 2017	Mawazine	Rabat, Morocco	"Confident"; "Heart Attack"; "Fire Starter"; "For You"; "Body Say"; "Wildfire"; "My Love Is Like a Star"; "Fix a Heart"/"Nightingale"/"Warrior"; "Two Pieces"; "Lionheart"; "Waitin for You"; "Old Ways"; "Kingdom Come"; "Got Dynamite"; "Don't Forget"/"Catch Me"; "Yes"; "Stone Cold"; "Skyscraper"; "Give Your Heart a Break"; "Neon Lights"; "Cool for the Summer"	
July 1, 2017	VillaMix	Goiânia, Brazil	"Confident"; "Heart Attack"; "Fire Starter"; "For You"; "Body Say"; "Wildfire"; "My Love Is Like a Star"; "Fix a Heart"; "Nightingale"/"Warrior"; "Two Pieces"; "Lionheart"; "Waitin for You"; "Old Ways"; "Got Dynamite"; "Catch Me"/"Don't Forget"; "Stone Cold"; "Skyscraper"; "Give Your Heart a Break"; "Cool for the Summer"	
August 19, 2017	Billboard Hot 100 Festival	Wantagh, New York, United States	"Confident"; "Cool for the Summer"; "Sorry Not Sorry"	
November 11, 2017	Free Radio Live	Birmingham, England	"Confident"; "Cool for the Summer"; "Tell Me You Love Me"; "Sorry Not Sorry"	
May 27, 2018	BBC Music's Biggest Weekend	Swansea, England	"Confident"; "Cool for the Summer"; "No Promises"; "Solo"; "Sorry Not Sorry"; "Tell Me You Love Me"; "Échame la culpa" (with Luis Fonsi)	
June 9, 2018	Summertime Ball	London, England	"Solo" (during Clean Bandit's set); "Instruction" (during Jax Jones' set)	
June 24, 2018	Rock in Rio	Lisbon, Portugal	"Confident"; "Heart Attack"; "Cool for the Summer"; "Sexy Dirty Love"; "Daddy Issues"; "Games"; "Concentrate"; "Catch Me"/"Don't Forget"; "Neon Lights"; "Give Your Heart a Break"; "Really Don't Care"; "Stone Cold"; "Skyscraper"; "No Promises"; "Échame la Culpa"; "Solo"; "Tell Me You Love Me"; "Sorry Not Sorry"; "Sober"	
July 22, 2018	California Mid-State Fair	Paso Robles, California, United States	"Confident"; "Heart Attack"; "Cool for the Summer"; "Sexy Dirty Love"; "Daddy Issues"; "Body Say"; "Games"; "Concentrate"; "Cry Baby"; "Fall in Line"; "Old Ways"; "No Promises"; "Échame la Culpa"; "Solo"; "Stone Cold"; "Skyscraper"; "Sober"; "Give Your Heart a Break"; "Tell Me You Love Me"; "Sorry Not Sorry"	
October 9, 2020	Pepsi Unmute Your Voice Concert	Virtual	"Confident"; "I Love Me"; "Still Have Me"; "Sorry Not Sorry"	
October 17, 2020	Save Our Stages Festival	Los Angeles, California, United States	"OK Not to Be OK" (with Marshmello)	
August 7, 2021	Sad Summer Fest	Anaheim, California, United States	"Monsters" (with All Time Low)	
September 25, 2021	Global Citizen Live	Los Angeles, California, United States	"Anyone"; "Mad World" (with Adam Lambert)	
August 13, 2022	Illinois State Fair	Springfield, Illinois, United States	"Holy Fvck"; "Freak"; "Substance"; "Eat Me"; "Confident"; "Here We Go Again"; "Remember December"; "La La Land"/"La La"; "Don't Forget"; "The Art of Starting Over"; "4 Ever 4 Me"/"Iris"; "Sorry Not Sorry"; "City of Angels"; "Skyscraper"; "29"; "Heart Attack"; "Skin of My Teeth"; "Happy Ending"; "Cool for the Summer"	
August 14, 2022	Iowa State Fair	Des Moines, Iowa, United States	"Holy Fvck"; "Freak"; "Substance"; "Eat Me"; "Confident"; "Here We Go Again"; "Remember December"; "La La Land"/"La La"; "Don't Forget"; "The Art of Starting Over"; "4 Ever 4 Me"/"Iris"; "Sorry Not Sorry"; "City of Angels"; "Skyscraper"; "29"; "Heart Attack"; "Skin of My Teeth"; "Happy Ending"; "Cool for the Summer"	
December 9, 2022	iHeartRadio Jingle Ball	New York, New York, United States	"Sorry Not Sorry"; Substance"; "Heart Attack"; "29"; "Cool for the Summer"	
December 11, 2022	iHeartRadio Jingle Ball	Boston, Massachusetts, United States	"Sorry Not Sorry"; Substance"; "Heart Attack"; "29"; "Cool for the Summer"	
June 16, 2023	North to Shore Festival	Asbury Park, New Jersey, United States	"Confident"; "Holy Fvck"; "Freak"; "Eat Me"; "Substance"; "La La Land"; "Don't Forget"; "Here We Go Again"; "Remember December"; "4 Ever 4 Me"; "Sorry Not Sorry"; "City Of Angels"; "Skyscraper"; "29"; "Heart Attack"; "Skin of My Teeth"; "Happy Ending"; "Cool for the Summer"	
July 4, 2023	Philadelphia Welcome America Festival	Philadelphia, Pennsylvania, United States	"Confident"; "Substance"; "Freak"; "Eat Me"; "La La Land"; "Don't Forget"; "Give Your Heart a Break"; "Tell Me You Love Me"; "Sorry Not Sorry"; "Skyscraper"; "Skin of My Teeth"; "Heart Attack"; "Cool for the Summer"	
August 26, 2023	Wonderbus Music & Arts Festival	Columbus, Ohio, United States	"Confident"; "Holy Fvck"; "Freak"; "Eat Me"; "Swine"; "Substance"; "La La Land"; "Don't Forget"; "Give Your Heart a Break"; "Tell Me You Love Me"; "4 Ever 4 Me"; "Sorry Not Sorry"; "Skyscraper"; "Happy Birthday to You"; "29"; "Skin of My Teeth"; "Heart Attack"; "Cool for the Summer"	
September 2, 2023	The Town Festival	São Paulo, Brazil	"Confident"; "Holy Fvck"; "Freak"; "Eat Me"; "Swine"; "Substance"; "La La Land"; "Don't Forget"; "Give Your Heart a Break"; "Tell Me You Love Me"; "Neon Lights"; "Sorry Not Sorry"; "Penhasco2"; "Skyscraper"; "29"; "Skin of My Teeth"; "Heart Attack"; "Cool for the Summer"	
September 13, 2023	Dreamforce 2023	San Francisco, California, United States	"Confident"; "Tell Me You Love Me"; "Cool for the Summer"; "La La Land"; "Give Your Heart a Break"; "Heart Attack"; "Substance"; "Skin of My Teeth"; "Sorry Not Sorry"; "Neon Lights"	
November 25, 2023	Top of the Mountain Concert	Ischgl, Austria	"Confident"; "Holy Fvck"; "Freak"; "Eat Me"; "Swine"; "Substance"; "Here We Go Again"; "Remember December"; "La La Land"; "Don't Forget"; "Give Your Heart a Break"; "Tell Me You Love Me"; "4 Ever 4 Me"; "Neon Lights"; "No Promises"; "Sorry Not Sorry"; "City of Angels"; "Skyscraper"; "29"; "Heart Attack"; "Cool for the Summer"	
August 24, 2024	Festival Hera	Mexico City, Mexico	"Confident"; "Neon Lights"; "La La Land"; "Don't Forget"; "Give Your Heart a Break"; "Tell Me You Love Me"; "Anyone"; "Skyscraper"; "Sorry Not Sorry"; "Heart Attack"; "Chula"; "Cool for the Summer"	

== Live performances ==
=== Don't Forget era ===
Date	Event	Country	Performed song(s)	Ref.
August 11, 2008	Good Morning America	United States	"Get Back"	
October 11, 2008	The Ellen DeGeneres Show	United States	"Get Back"	
January 20, 2009	Kids' Inaugural: "We Are the Future"	United States	"Get Back"; "La La Land"	
April 7, 2009	Dancing with the Stars	United States	"La La Land"	
April 14, 2009	The Ellen DeGeneres Show	United States	"Don't Forget"	

=== Here We Go Again era ===
Date	Event	Country	Performed song(s)	Ref.
July 17, 2009	Tonight Show with Conan O'Brien	United States	"Here We Go Again"	
July 23, 2009	Good Morning America	United States	"Here We Go Again"; "Catch Me"	
July 23, 2009	The View	United States	"Here We Go Again"	
July 23, 2009	Late Night with Jimmy Fallon	United States	"Here We Go Again"	
January 29, 2010	The Alan Titchmarsh Show	United Kingdom	"Remember December"	
March 24, 2010	American Idol	United States	"Make a Wave" (with Joe Jonas)	
May 21, 2010	Good Morning America	United States	"Can't Back Down"	
August 10, 2010	Good Morning America	United States	"Wouldn't Change a Thing" (with Joe Jonas); "It's On" (with Camp Rock 2 cast)	

=== Unbroken era ===
Date	Event	Country	Performed song(s)	Ref.
August 18, 2011	2011 Do Something Awards	United States	"Skyscraper"	
August 24, 2011	America's Got Talent	United States	"Skyscraper"	
September 10, 2011	2011 ALMA Awards	United States	"Skyscraper"	
September 19, 2011	Good Morning America	United States	"Skyscraper"; "Who's That Boy"	
September 19, 2011	The Ellen DeGeneres Show	United States	"Skyscraper"	
September 27, 2011	Dancing with the Stars	United States	"Skyscraper"	
January 12, 2012	38th People's Choice Awards	United States	"Give Your Heart a Break"	
March 6, 2012	Today	United States	"Give Your Heart a Break"; "Skyscraper"	
March 15, 2012	American Idol	United States	"Give Your Heart a Break"	
May 18, 2012	VEVO Presents: An Intimate Performance	United States	"Give Your Heart a Break"; "Fix a Heart"; "Catch Me" / "Don't Forget"; "My Love is Like a Star"; "Skyscraper"	
July 6, 2012	Good Morning America	United States	"Give Your Heart a Break"; "Skyscraper"; "Unbroken"; "Fix a Heart"	
August 21, 2012	2012 Fanta Irresistible Awards	Mexico	"Skyscraper"; "Give Your Heart a Break"	
September 6, 2012	2012 MTV Video Music Awards (Pre-show)	United States	"Give Your Heart a Break"	
December 16, 2012	VH1 Divas	United States	"Give Your Heart a Break"	
December 19, 2012	The X Factor	United States	"Give Your Heart a Break" (with Fifth Harmony)	

=== Demi era ===
Date	Event	Country	Performed song(s)	Ref.
April 1, 2013	Jimmy Kimmel Live!	United States	"Heart Attack"	
April 2, 2013	Dancing with the Stars	United States	"Heart Attack"	
April 10, 2013	Good Morning America	United States	"Heart Attack"; "Give Your Heart a Break"	
May 13, 2013	The Ellen DeGeneres Show	United States	"Heart Attack"	
May 30, 2013	Britain's Got Talent	United Kingdom	"Heart Attack"	
June 16, 2013	2013 MuchMusic Video Awards	Canada	"Give Your Heart a Break"; "Heart Attack"	
June 28, 2013	Good Morning America	United States	"Heart Attack"; "Made in the USA"; "Give Your Heart a Break"; "Really Don't Care"	
August 11, 2013	Teen Choice Awards 2013	United States	"Made in the USA" (with Nick Jonas on drums)	
October 3, 2013	The Tonight Show with Jay Leno	United States	"Neon Lights"	
October 7, 2013	The Ellen DeGeneres Show	United States	"Neon Lights"	
October 21, 2013	Coletivation	Brazil	"Heart Attack"; "Skyscraper"; "Neon Lights"; "Really Don't Care"	
November 28, 2013	The X Factor	United States	"Neon Lights"	
April 28, 2014	Fantástico	Brazil	"Neon Lights"; "Really Don't Care"	
May 21, 2014	American Idol	United States	"Neon Lights"; "Really Don't Care"	
May 30, 2014	This Morning	United Kingdom	"Neon Lights"	
June 3, 2014	Capital FM Session	United Kingdom	"Heart Attack"; "Give Your Heart a Break"; "Neon Lights"; "Give Me Love"	
June 4, 2014	Late Night with Seth Meyers	United States	"Really Don't Care"	
June 6, 2014	Good Morning America	United States	"Really Don't Care"; "Neon Lights"; "Heart Attack"; "Nightingale"	
August 10, 2014	Teen Choice Awards 2014	United States	"Really Don't Care" (with Cher Lloyd)	
November 10, 2014	The Ellen DeGeneres Show	United States	"Somebody to You" (with The Vamps)	
November 13, 2014	Royal Variety Performance	United Kingdom	"Let It Go"	
December 14, 2014	The X Factor	United Kingdom	"Up" (with Olly Murs)	
March 18, 2015	Lovato Scholarship Benefit	United States	"Skyscraper"; "Nightingale"; "Believe In Me"; "Warrior"	
May 24, 2015	2nd Indonesian Choice Awards	Indonesia	"Let It Go"; "Heart Attack"; "Give Your Heart a Break"; "Neon Lights"	

=== Confident era ===
Date	Event	Country	Performed song(s)	Ref.
August 9, 2015	The Voice	Australia	"Cool for the Summer"	
August 10, 2015	Sunrise	Australia	"Cool for the Summer"	
August 30, 2015	2015 MTV Video Music Awards	United States	"Cool for the Summer" (with Iggy Azalea)	
August 31, 2015	Jimmy Kimmel Live!	United States	"Cool for the Summer"; "Neon Lights"	
September 9, 2015	Live Lounge	United Kingdom	"Cool for the Summer"; "Take Me to Church"	
September 10, 2015	Alan Carr: Chatty Man	United Kingdom	"Cool for the Summer"	
October 17, 2015	Saturday Night Live	United States	"Cool for the Summer" / "Confident"; "Stone Cold"	
October 29, 2015	Good Morning America	United States	"Confident"	
October 30, 2015	The Tonight Show Starring Jimmy Fallon	United States	"Confident"	
November 6, 2015	Idol	Sweden	"Confident"; "Ain't No Mountain High Enough"	
November 8, 2015	BBC Radio 1's Teen Awards 2015	United Kingdom	"Confident"	
November 22, 2015	American Music Awards of 2015	United States	"Confident"	
December 11, 2015	Billboard Women in Music 2015	United States	"Stone Cold"	
February 9, 2016	The Ellen DeGeneres Show	United States	"Stone Cold"	
February 13, 2016	MusiCares Person of the Year	United States	"Penny Lover"	
February 15, 2016	58th Annual Grammy Awards	United States	"Hello"	
February 16, 2016	The Ellen DeGeneres Show	United States	"Irresistible" (with Fall Out Boy)	
February 25, 2016	In Performance at the White House: Ray Charles	United States	"You Don't Know Me"; "Heaven Help Us All" (with Andra Day, Brittany Howard and Yolanda Adams)	
March 3, 2016	American Idol	United States	"Confident"; "Stone Cold"	
March 9, 2016	Victoria's Secret Swim Special	United States; Saint Barthélemy	"Cool for the Summer"; "Confident"; "For You"	
March 16, 2016	The Late Late Show with James Corden	United States	"Stone Cold"	
April 2, 2016	27th GLAAD Media Awards	United States	"Stone Cold"	
April 3, 2016	3rd iHeartRadio Music Awards	United States	"Stone Cold" (with Brad Paisley on guitar)	
May 16, 2016	The Late Late Show with James Corden	United States	(Carpool Karaoke segment with Nick Jonas); "Heart Attack"; "Stone Cold"; "Close"; "Jealous"; "Cake by the Ocean"; "Confident"	
May 22, 2016	2016 Billboard Music Awards	United States	"Cool for the Summer"	
May 24, 2016	Jimmy Kimmel Live!	United States	"Without a Fight" (with Brad Paisley)	
June 17, 2016	Good Morning America	United States	"Confident"; "Cool for the Summer"; "Stone Cold" (with Brad Paisley on guitar); "For You"; "Without a Fight" (with Brad Paisley); "Neon Lights"	
July 25, 2016	Democratic National Convention, 2016	United States	"Confident"	
February 12, 2017	59th Annual Grammy Awards	United States	"Stayin' Alive"	
February 14, 2017	Stayin' Alive: A Grammy Salute	United States	"Stayin' Alive"; "If I Can't Have You"	
April 5, 2017	The Late Late Show with James Corden	United States	(Divas Riff-Off segment); "Rolling in the Deep"; "Roar"; "Heart Attack"; "I Will Survive"	
May 22, 2017	The Tonight Show Starring Jimmy Fallon	United States	"No Promises" (with Cheat Codes)	

=== Tell Me You Love Me era ===
Date	Event	Country	Performed song(s)	Ref.
August 18, 2017	Good Morning America	United States	"Instruction"; "Sorry Not Sorry"; "No Promises"	
August 27, 2017	2017 MTV Video Music Awards	United States	"Sorry Not Sorry"; "Cool For The Summer"	
September 12, 2017	Hand in Hand: A Benefit for Hurricane Relief	United States	"With a Little Help from My Friends" (with Brad Paisley, Darius Rucker and CeCe Winans)	
September 18, 2017	The Tonight Show Starring Jimmy Fallon	United States	"Sorry Not Sorry"	
September 30, 2017	The Jonathan Ross Show	United Kingdom	"Sorry Not Sorry"	
October 4, 2017	The Ellen DeGeneres Show	United States	"Sorry Not Sorry"	
October 5, 2017	Today	United States	"Sorry Not Sorry"; "Tell Me You Love Me"	
October 14, 2017	One Voice: Somos Live!	United States	"Hallelujah"	
November 8, 2017	2017 Telehit Awards	Mexico	"Confident"; "Cool for the Summer"; "Sexy Dirty Love"; "Tell Me You Love Me"; "Sorry Not Sorry"	
November 10, 2017	Sounds Like Friday Night	United Kingdom	"Instruction" (with Jax Jones and Stefflon Don); "Tell Me You Love Me"	
November 12, 2017	2017 MTV Europe Music Awards	United Kingdom	"Sorry Not Sorry"; "Tell Me You Love Me"	
November 13, 2017	Live Lounge	United Kingdom	"Sorry Not Sorry"; "Skyscraper"; "Too Good at Goodbyes"	
November 19, 2017	American Music Awards of 2017	United States	"Sorry Not Sorry"	
December 19, 2017	The Voice	United States	"Tell Me You Love Me"	
January 15, 2018	The Ellen DeGeneres Show	United States	"Tell Me You Love Me"	
March 24, 2018	March for Our Lives	United States	"Skyscraper"	
May 20, 2018	2018 Billboard Music Awards	United States	"Fall in Line" (with Christina Aguilera)	

=== Dancing with the Devil... the Art of Starting Over era ===
Date	Event	Country	Performed song(s)	Ref.
January 26, 2020	62nd Annual Grammy Awards	United States	"Anyone"	
February 2, 2020	Super Bowl LIV	United States	"The Star-Spangled Banner"	
March 29, 2020	iHeart Living Room Concert for America	United States	"Skyscraper"	
March 31, 2020	The Tonight Show Starring Jimmy Fallon	United States	"I Love Me"	
April 16, 2020	The Disney Family Singalong	United States	"A Dream Is a Wish Your Heart Makes" (with Michael Bublé)	
October 14, 2020	2020 Billboard Music Awards	United States	"Commander in Chief"	
January 20, 2021	Celebrating America	United States	"Lovely Day"	
February 22, 2021	The Ellen DeGeneres Show	United States	"What Other People Say" (with Sam Fischer)	
March 22, 2021	Demi Lovato: Dancing with the Devil Screening	United States	"ICU (Madison's Lullaby)"; "Dancing with the Devil"; "Anyone"	
April 2, 2021	Good Morning America	United States	"The Art of Starting Over"	
April 5, 2021	Live on TikTok	United States	"The Art of Starting Over"; "California Sober; "The Way You Don't Look At Me"; "Mad World"; "Tell Me You Love Me"; "OK Not to Be OK"; "ICU (Madison's Lullaby)"; "Dancing with the Devil"	
April 9, 2021	The Tonight Show Starring Jimmy Fallon	United States	"Dancing with the Devil"	
April 14, 2021	Tiny Desk Concert	United States	"Tell Me You Love Me"; "The Art of Starting Over"; "Dancing with the Devil"	
May 27, 2021	2021 iHeartRadio Music Awards	United States	"I'm Still Standing"	
June 25, 2021	YouTube Pride 2021	United States	"Cool for the Summer"; "My Girlfriends Are My Boyfriend"; "The Kind of Lover I Am"; "Easy" (with Noah Cyrus)	

=== Holy Fvck era ===
Date	Event	Country	Performed song(s)	Ref.
June 9, 2022	The Tonight Show Starring Jimmy Fallon	United States	"Skin of My Teeth"	
July 14, 2022	Jimmy Kimmel Live!	United States	"Substance"	
August 16, 2022	The Tonight Show Starring Jimmy Fallon	United States	"Substance"	
August 18, 2022	The Tonight Show Starring Jimmy Fallon	United States	"29"	
August 19, 2022	Good Morning America	United States	"Substance"; "Cool for the Summer"; "29"	
March 18, 2023	Concert in Dubai	United Arab Emirates	"Holy Fvck"; "Freak"; "Substance"; "Eat Me"; "Confident"; "Here We Go Again"; "Remember December"; "La La Land"; "Don't Forget"; "4 Ever 4 Me"; "Sorry Not Sorry"; "City of Angels"; "Skyscraper"; "29"; "Heart Attack"; "Skin of My Teeth"; "Happy Ending"; "Cool for the Summer"	

=== Revamped era ===
Date	Event	Country	Performed song(s)	Ref.
July 4, 2023	CNN's The Fourth In America	United States	"Sorry Not Sorry"; "Heart Attack"; "Cool for the Summer"	
September 11, 2023	The Howard Stern Show	United States	"Heart Attack"; "Cool for the Summer"	
September 12, 2023	2023 MTV Video Music Awards	United States	"Heart Attack"; "Sorry Not Sorry"; "Cool for the Summer"	
November 28, 2023	M2 Stage	United Arab Emirates	"Confident"; "Give Your Heart a Break"; "Skyscraper"; "Sorry Not Sorry"; "Cool for the Summer"; "Heart Attack"; "Neon Lights"	
December 31, 2023	New Year's Eve at The Chelsea at The Cosmopolitan of Las Vegas	United States	"Confident"; "Holy Fvck"; "Freak"; "Eat Me"; "Swine"; "Substance"; "Here We Go Again"; "Remember December"; "La La Land" / "Don't Forget"; "Give Your Heart a Break"; "Tell Me You Love Me"; "4 Ever 4 Me"; "Neon Lights"; "No Promises"; 'Solo"; "Skyscraper"; "Stone Cold"; "29"; "Sorry Not Sorry"; "Skin of my Teeth"; "Heart Attack"; "Cool for the Summer"	
January 31, 2024	Red Dress Concert	United States	"Confident"; "Heart Attack"; "Anyone"; "No Promises"; "Skyscraper"; "Sorry Not Sorry"; "Neon Lights"; "Cool for the Summer"	
March 7, 2024	Billboard Women in Music 2024	United States	"Penhasco2" (with Luísa Sonza)	
July 18, 2024	OGX Live From Los Angeles	United States	"Confident"; "Give Your Heart a Break"; "Sorry Not Sorry"; "Heart Attack"; "OGX"; "Cool for the Summer"	

=== It's Not That Deep era ===
Date	Event	Country	Performed song(s)	Ref.
October 22, 2025	Live Lounge	United Kingdom	"Here All Night"; "Disease" / "Perfect Celebrity"	
October 26, 2025	One Night Only at the Palladium	United States	"Fast"; "Kiss"; "Frequency"; "Here All Night"; "Heart Attack"; "Give Your Heart a Break"; "Sorry Not Sorry"; "Let You Go"; "Ghost"; "Say It"; "Little Bit"; "Neon Lights"; "Really Don't Care"; "This Is Me"; "Sorry to Myself"; "Cool for the Summer"	
December 31, 2025	Dick Clark's New Year's Rockin' Eve	United States	"Sorry Not Sorry"; "Sorry to Myself"; "Heart Attack"	
