= This Is Me =

This Is Me may refer to:

== Albums ==
- This Is Me (Heather Peace album), 2010
- This Is Me (Jully Black album), or the title song, 2005
- This Is Me (Kierra Sheard album), or the title song, 2006
- This Is Me (Randy Travis album), or the title song (see below), 1994
- This Is Me, by Charlee, 2011
- This Is Me, by Bakithi Kumalo, 2005
- This Is Me, by Eddie from Ohio, 2004

== Films ==
- This Is Me (film), a 2015 Chinese film

== Songs ==
- "This Is Me" (Climie Fisher song), 1986
- "This Is Me" (Demi Lovato song), from the 2008 film Camp Rock
- "This Is Me" (Dream song), 2001
- "This Is Me" (The Greatest Showman song), 2017, performed by Keala Settle in the film and covered by Kesha
- "This Is Me" (Misia song), 2011
- "This Is Me" (Monrose song), 2010
- "This Is Me" (Randy Travis song), 1994
- "This Is Me", by Skye Sweetnam, from the movie The Barbie Diaries
- "This Is Me", by Juelz Santana, from the album What the Game's Been Missing!
- "This Is Me/Goodbye", by Tech N9ne, from the album Everready (The Religion)
- "This Is Me", by Status Quo, from the album The Party Ain't Over Yet
- "This Is Me", by Reks, from the album Rhythmatic Eternal King Supreme

== See also ==
- This Is Me... Justified and Stripped, a 2004 album by Butch Walker
- This Is M.E., a 2014 album by Melissa Etheridge
- Multiple projects by Jennifer Lopez

- This Is Me... Then, 2002 album
- This Is Me... Now, 2024 album

- This Is Me... Now: A Love Story, 2024 film based on the album

- This Is Me... Live, 2024 concert tour
