= Remember December =

2010 single by Demi Lovato

Single by Demi Lovato

from the album Here We Go Again
- Released: January 18, 2010
- Recorded: 2009
- Studio: Studio Wishbone (Los Angeles, California)
- Genre: Power pop; pop rock
- Length: 3:12
- Label: Hollywood
- Songwriters: Demi Lovato; John Fields; Anne Preven
- Producer: John Fields

Demi Lovato singles chronology
"Here We Go Again" (2010)	"Remember December" (2010)	"We'll Be a Dream" (2010)

Music video
- "Remember December" on YouTube

"Remember December" is a song by American singer Demi Lovato for her second studio album, Here We Go Again. It was written by John Fields, Lovato and Anne Preven, and produced by Fields. The song was released in Europe as the album's second and final single on January 18, 2010 through Hollywood Records. "Remember December" adapts power pop and synth-pop genres and diverges from Lovato's usual pop rock sound. The lyrics describe the speaker's attempt to remind her boyfriend of the good times of their relationship. Lovato described the song's sound as an example of what she wanted her future music to sound like.

"Remember December" received generally positive reviews from music critics; the majority of them praised its hook and chorus. Some critics also named it one of the album's standouts. The single did not achieve commercial success, peaking at numbers 70 in Scotland and 80 in the United Kingdom while failing to enter charts elsewhere. It sold 144,000 copies in the United States, according to Nielsen SoundScan. Lovato has performed the song numerous times, including on her tour Summer Tour 2009 and The Alan Titchmarsh Show.

== Background ==
In January 2009, Lovato began writing the songs for her sophomore album Here We Go Again, right after filming from the first season of Sonny with a Chance. In April 2009, Lovato explained about the album's process and collaborating with other songwriters and artists, such as Jon McLaughlin and The Academy Is... lead singer William Beckett. Unlike her first studio album Don't Forget, she did not collaborate with the Jonas Brothers, as she wanted to see what her sound would be like without their input. According to Lovato, the album's writing process was nearly completed in just two weeks.

Lovato worked with songwriter Anne Preven wrote three songs on the album, "Solo", "Quiet" and "Remember December". John Fields, who helmed production on Don't Forget, co-wrote "Remember December" with Lovato and Preven, and produced all three songs, along with the majority of the album. The recording sessions for the album began in January 2009, and "Remember December" was recorded by Fields in Studio Wishbone in Los Angeles, California. The song features Owsley on guitars, synths and backing vocals, and Dorian Crozier on drums. Tommy Barbarella contributed synths, while Ken Chastain handled percussion. Fields and Paul David Hager mixed the recordings. In an interview with Jocelyn Vena of MTV News, Lovato said that the song is meant for "all her girls out there who need to remind guys that they messed up". In the same interview, she said that it is different from her usual pop rock sound:

I love this song for many reasons. It had a different sound than a lot of my songs. I related to it personally more than other songs, and I have so much fun with it. I thought if it could be a single that it would be incredible to perform it all the time ... What stands out about the song [is that] I can dance to it and rock out to it, which is ultimately my goal. I was just so excited when I heard this one, 'cause it's the epitome of where I want to go with the future.

== Composition and lyrical interpretation ==
"Remember December"
A 20-second sample of "Remember December", a 1980s-inspired power pop song. The song sees Lovato reminding a boyfriend about "the good times" of their relationship.

"Remember December" is a 1980s-inspired power pop song with influences of synth-pop and pop rock. Patrick Varine of The Observer-Dispatch noted "a bit of techno", and Fraser McAlpine of BBC Music referred the verses to as "moody synth-pop". Critics made comparisons with works by rock bands Paramore and The Veronicas. According to the sheet music published at Musicnotes.com by Walt Disney Music Publishing, "Remember December" is composed in the time signature of common time, with a moderate beat rate of 112 beats per minute. It is composed in the key of F minor and Lovato's vocal range spans from the low note of E♭_{4} to the high note of F_{5}. It has a basic sequence of F_{5}–A♭_{5}–D♭_{5} as its chord progression.

The song begins with Lovato singing "I feel a separation coming on, Cos [sic] I know, you want to be moving on." Lyrically, the song sees the protagonist reminisce about a winter romance, with lines such as, "I remember us together / We promised that forever." Los Angeles Times critic Margaret Wappler deemed it an "ode to breakups" and noted that the protagonist asks her willful boyfriend to remember "the good times" of their relationship. In the chorus, she sings "Don't surrender, surrender, surrender", before asking him to remember their "promise of forever". Lovato explained that the song is about "a girl [who] has so much to say to the guy, and it feels like he's not listening, and she wants him to remember everything that they had".

== Release and reception ==
"Remember December" was released as the second and final single from Here We Go Again. The song was first released in Scandinavian countries via digital download on January 18, 2010, through Hollywood Records. The song was later released as a CD single and digital download in the UK on February 15, 2010. The physical release includes a club mix of the song by Sharp Boys, while the digital release also includes a radio edit of the remix. Following its release, "Remember December" peaked at number 80 on the UK Singles Chart on February 27, 2010.

The song received generally positive reviews from critics. AllMusic critic Stephen Thomas Erlewine considered Here We Go Again "not quite as much fun", as Lovato's debut album Don't Forget, "but still fun, particularly when Lovato tears into hooky power pop like ... 'Remember December'." Erlewine also named the song one of the best tracks on the album. BBC Music's Fraser McAlpine rated it four out of five stars, and wrote, "I'm sure there's a punkrock reason why we should all get together and hate it, but for the life of me I just can't. Even with the weird pronunciation and silly lyrics, this is a corker." McAlpine praised the "grand" chorus and wrote: "Someone in Team Lovato has been cocking an ear to the musical stylings of Paramore and maybe suggested that the next logical step after Camp Rock's wholesome Disneyfication of popular song might be something a little more confessional."

Cody Miller of PopMatters was positive regarding the song, writing: "When a real hook pops up, as on 'Remember December', Lovato really bites into it, belting and howling with enough melodrama and bravado to actually make one believe [the] lines." Tamar Anitai of MTV Buzzworthy named the track the fifth best song of 2009, calling it "the strongest and best" on Here We Go Again. Anitai wrote, "'Remember December' is a serious standout that quickly makes it point with Demi behind the wheel – seriously speeding – the whole time. It's the perfect showcase for Demi's way-beyond-her-years vocals and ability to sell a song without sugar-coating it." In a more mixed review, Nick Levine of Digital Spy awarded it three out of five stars and said that it lacked "original ideas", but said that it "does at least have a decent chorus". Levine called it a "Veronicas-lite pop-rock stomper" and praised Lovato's vocals.

== Music video ==
Lovato performing on stage in the music video for "Remember December".

"Remember December" was directed by Tim Wheeler, who co-directed the videos of Lovato's previous singles, "Here We Go Again" and "La La Land". Lovato was interviewed by MTV News on the set of the music video, where she stated that it stays true to the song's theme: "The music video relates to the song in a way ... And so instead of having a love interest in this video, it's all about being fierce and kind of, like, taking control as a girl. It's like girl empowerment. Yeah, divas!" She described the video as "really, really glam rock". According to Wheeler, the concept behind the video was to incorporate different lights and backlights. The video premiered on November 12, 2009 and was made available for download in the iTunes Store on December 1, 2009.

The music video includes three scenes in chronological order: The first scene was Lovato performing with her band on stage while sporting a "Rock Chick" outfit with a black leather jacket and stud gloves. The second scene was Lovato with her friends portrayed by Meaghan Martin, Anna Maria Perez de Taglé and Chloe Bridges (guest stars of Lovato's then-upcoming Disney Channel television film Camp Rock 2: The Final Jam) are taking their night out into the streets of Los Angeles. The third and last scene was Lovato wearing a glitter hooded sweatshirt while standing in front of bright lights.

== Live performances ==
Lovato performed the song for the first time on her Summer Tour 2009, where it was sung towards the end of the show. Althea Legaspi of Chicago Tribune wrote that the song "demonstrated her rock singing chops". Thomas Kinter of the Hartford Courant commented that Lovato "loosened up a bit" with "Every Time You Lie" and returned to "full-bore vocal blaring" for "Remember December". During a string of promotional appearances in the United Kingdom in early-2010, Lovato performed "Remember December" on The Alan Titchmarsh Show on January 29, 2010. In September 2011, she performed it during the revue concert An Evening with Demi Lovato. It was also the closing song of the setlist during the tour A Special Night with Demi Lovato.

== Formats and track listings ==
- CD single
1. "Remember December" – 3:11
2. "Remember December" (Sharp Boys Club Mix) – 6:18
- Digital download
1. "Remember December" – 3:12
- Digital EP
1. "Remember December" – 3:12
2. "Remember December" (Sharp Boys Club Mix) – 6:19
3. "Remember December" (Sharp Boys Radio Edit) – 3:48

== Credits and personnel ==
Recording

- Recorded at Studio Wishbone, Los Angeles, California

Personnel

- Demi Lovato – songwriting, lead vocals
- John Fields – songwriting, production, bass, guitars, keyboards, programming, recording, mixing
- Will Owsley – guitars, synthesizers, background vocals
- Dorian Crozier – drums
- Michael Bland – programming
- Tommy Barbarella – synthesizer
- Ken Chastain – percussion, programming
- Paul David Hager – mixing

Credits are adapted from the Here We Go Again liner notes.

== Charts ==
Chart performance for "Remember December"
Chart (2010)	Peak position
Scotland (Official Charts Company)	70
UK Singles (Official Charts Company)	80

== Release history ==
Country	Release date	Format(s)
Denmark	January 18, 2010	Digital download
Finland	January 18, 2010	Digital download
Sweden	January 18, 2010	Digital download
Norway	February 15, 2010	Digital download
United Kingdom	February 15, 2010	CD single, digital download
