= Full Circle (Randy Travis album) =

1996 studio album by Randy Travis

Studio album by Randy Travis
- Released: August 13, 1996
- Genre: Country
- Label: Warner Records
- Producer: Kyle Lehning

Randy Travis chronology
This Is Me (1994)	Full Circle (1996)	You and You Alone (1998)

Singles from Full Circle
- 1. "Are We in Trouble Now" Released: June 10, 1996; 2. "Would I" Released: September 30, 1996

Full Circle is the tenth studio album by American country music artist Randy Travis. It was released on August 13, 1996 by Warner Records. His last album for Warner Bros. Records until 2008 (not counting his later country-gospel works for Word/Warner/Curb), the album produced four singles: "Are We in Trouble Now", "Would I", "Price to Pay", and a cover of Roger Miller's hit single "King of the Road"; the cover also appeared on the soundtrack to the 1997 film Traveller.

"Are We in Trouble Now" was written by Mark Knopfler. Travis cowrote three of the album's songs.

== Critical reception ==
Professional ratings
Review scores
Source	Rating
AllMusic	4/5 stars
The Encyclopedia of Popular Music	3/5 stars
Entertainment Weekly	A−
Lincoln Journal Star	4/4 stars
Orlando Sentinel	3/5 stars
USA Today	3.5/4 stars
Windsor Star	B+

The Lincoln Journal Star wrote that "when he's on, Travis' lonesome North Carolina baritone slurs and slides with smoothness and feeling that few can match." USA Today thought that "Travis' aching baritone again sounds fresh as rain compared with the river of drivel pouring out of Nashville."

== Track listing ==
No.	Title	Writer(s)	Length
1.	"Highway Junkie"	Chris Knight, Annie Tate, Sam Tate	3:57
2.	"Price to Pay"	Craig Wiseman, Trey Bruce	3:46
3.	"Long on Lonely (Short on Pride)"	Bucky Jones, Bob McDill, Dickey Lee	3:26
4.	"Would I"	Mark Winchester	2:23
5.	"Future Mister Me"	Randy Travis, John Lindley	3:05
6.	"Don't Take Your Love Away from Me"	Verlon Thompson, Mark D. Sanders	2:53
7.	"Are We in Trouble Now"	Mark Knopfler	3:40
8.	"If It Ain't One Thing, It's Another"	Joe Stampley, Tony Stampley, Bobby Carmichael	2:15
9.	"I Wish It Would Rain"	Travis, Ron Avis	3:15
10.	"King of the Road"	Roger Miller	3:49
11.	"I Can Almost Hear Her Wings"	Travis, Eddie Lee, Buck Moore	4:21
12.	"Ants on a Log"	Skip Ewing, Donny Kees	3:27

== Personnel ==
- Mike Brignardello - bass guitar
- Robbie Buchanan - piano
- Dennis Burnside - keyboards
- Larry Byrom - electric guitar, acoustic guitar
- Dave Carpenter - upright bass
- Mark Casstevens - electric guitar, acoustic guitar
- Alvin Chea - background vocals
- Cherry Sisters (Lisa Silver, Sherry Huffman, Diane Tidwell) - background vocals
- Dan Dugmore - steel guitar, electric guitar
- Paul Franklin - steel guitar, Dobro
- Steve Gibson - electric guitar
- David Hungate - bass guitar
- Roy Huskey Jr. - upright bass
- Paul Leim - drums
- Chris Leuzinger - electric guitar
- JayDee Maness - steel guitar
- Brent Mason - electric guitar, acoustic guitar
- Gene Miller - background vocals
- Steve Nathan - keyboards
- Dean Parks - acoustic guitar
- Hargus "Pig" Robbins - piano
- Matt Rollings - piano
- John Wesley Ryles - background vocals
- Mike Shapiro - drums
- Hank Singer - fiddle
- Milton Sledge - drums
- Randy Travis - acoustic guitar, lead vocals
- Billy Joe Walker Jr. - electric guitar, acoustic guitar
- Mervyn Warren - background vocals
- Dennis Wilson - background vocals
- Curtis Wright - background vocals
- Curtis Young - background vocals

== Chart performance ==
Chart (1996)	Peak position
U.S. Billboard Top Country Albums	9
U.S. Billboard 200	77
Canadian RPM Country Albums	10
