= Here We Go Again (Demi Lovato song) =

2009 single by Demi Lovato

Single by Demi Lovato

from the album Here We Go Again
- Released: June 23, 2009
- Recorded: 2009
- Studio: SuperSpy Studios (Los Angeles); Resonate Studios (Burbank); Safe House Studios; The Jungle Room
- Genre: Power pop
- Length: 3:46
- Label: Hollywood
- Songwriters: Isaac Hasson; Lindy Robbins; Mher Filian
- Producer: SuperSpy

Demi Lovato singles chronology
"Don't Forget" (2009)	"Here We Go Again" (2009)	"Remember December" (2010)

Music video
- "Here We Go Again" on YouTube

"Here We Go Again" is a song recorded by American singer Demi Lovato. It was written by Isaac Hasson, Lindy Robbins and Mher Filian and produced by SuperSpy, for Lovato's second studio album of the same name. It was released as the album's lead single on June 23, 2009, through Hollywood Records. The song was the only single from Here We Go Again released in North America. "Here We Go Again" is a power pop song with guitar lines and pop hooks and the lyrics speak of the protagonist's on-off relationship with a hesitant boyfriend.

The song received positive reviews from critics, who praised its pop hook and made comparisons to works of Kelly Clarkson. "Here We Go Again" peaked at number 15 on the Billboard Hot 100 and became Lovato's first top 40 hit on the chart as a solo artist. The song was certified platinum by the RIAA in 2014. It also peaked at number 38 in New Zealand and in the lower region of the Canadian Hot 100.

== Background ==
Lovato released her debut studio album, Don't Forget, in September 2008. Shortly thereafter, in January 2009, she had already begun writing material for her sophomore effort. The recording sessions for the album began in January 2009, right after filming from the first season of Sonny with a Chance. According to Lovato, the album's writing process was nearly finished in just two weeks. Unlike Don't Forget, Lovato did not collaborate with the Jonas Brothers for her second album as she wanted to see what her sound would be like without their input. "Here We Go Again" was written by Isaac Hasson, Lindy Robbins and Mher Filian, and produced by Hasson and Filian under the production name SuperSpy. The duo also co-wrote and produced the album track "U Got Nothin' on Me".

"Here We Go Again" was recorded at three different recording studios in California; SuperSpy Studios in Los Angeles, Resonate Studios in Burbank, and The Jungle Room in Glendale. Additional recording took place at Safe House Studios in Greensboro, North Carolina. Co-writer Robbins contributed backing vocals. Hasson provided programming, guitars and synths, and Filian handled programming and keys. The instruments were played by Dorian Crozier, who provided drums, and Kenny Johnson, who played the bass. The song was ultimately mixed by Chris Lord-Alge. "Here We Go Again" premiered during Planet Premiere on Radio Disney on June 17, 2009, and was released as the lead single for the album of the same name via digital download on June 23, through Hollywood Records. It was later released in Australia and New Zealand on July 17, 2009.

== Composition ==
"Here We Go Again"
A sample of "Here We Go Again", a power pop song with lyrics about an on-off relationship.

"Here We Go Again" is an uptempo power pop song, with guitar lines and pop hooks. Critics made comparisons with works by Kelly Clarkson, particularly the song "Since U Been Gone". According to sheet music published at Musicnotes.com by Kobalt Music Publishing, "Here We Go Again" is written in the time signature of common time, with a moderately fast tempo of 142 beats per minute. It is composed in the key of F major and Lovato's vocal range spans from the low note of F_{3} to the high note of A_{5}. It has a basic sequence of F–Dm–Dm–Gm/B♭–F as its chord progression. The song's lyrics chronicle the protagonist's on-off relationship with an indecisive boy as she sings that "Something about you is so addictive". Lovato explained: "So it's about, basically, being in a relationship where you break up and you make up, and you break up and it's like 'Here we go again, we just keep doing this over and over'."

== Reception ==
=== Critical reception ===
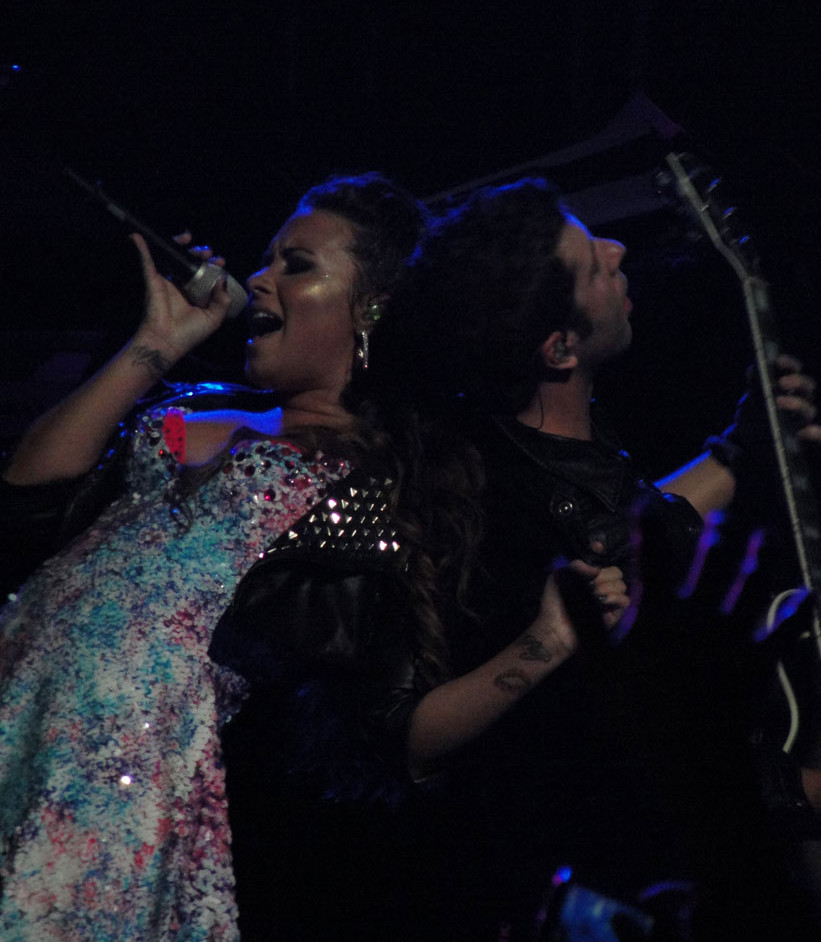
Lovato performing the song during An Evening with Demi Lovato, September 2011

"Here We Go Again" received generally positive reviews from music critics. The Arizona Republic's Ed Masley referred it to as "an explosion of pop hooks delivered with a winning blend of heartache and bravado". Kerri Mason of Billboard called the song a potential hit single and noted that Lovato "almost sounds like Kelly Clarkson's kid sister". Margaret Wappler of Los Angeles Times compared it to Clarkson's "Since U Been Gone" and wrote that Lovato "tells a guy where to stick it over buff guitar lines". Stephen Thomas Erlewine of Allmusic called the album "not quite as much fun" as Don't Forget, "but still fun, particularly when Lovato tears into hooky power pop like 'Here We Go Again'." Erlewine also named it one of the best tracks on the album. Chicago Tribune's Althea Legaspi referred it to as "anthemic" and "catchy", while Houston Chronicle critic Joey Guerra described it was not as "immediate a grabber" as Lovato's previous singles.

=== Chart performance ===
In the United States, "Here We Go Again" debuted on the Billboard Hot 100 at number 51 on July 11, 2009. After two weeks on the chart, it fell to number 66, before rising to number 24 the next week, in addition to being named the "greatest digital gainer". Coinciding with the release of the parent album, the song peaked at number 15 on August 8, 2009. The song became Lovato's highest-peaking solo single on the chart until "Skyscraper", peaked at number 10 in July 2011. The song has sold 880,000 digital copies in the United States, according to Nielsen SoundScan. In Canada, "Here We Go Again" debuted at number 86 on July 11, 2009, of the Canadian Hot 100. It fell off the following week, and re-entered on August 8, 2009, at number 61, which became its peak position. In New Zealand, the song entered and peaked at number 38, becoming Lovato's first entry on the chart.

== Music video ==
"Here We Go Again" was directed by Brendan Malloy and Tim Wheeler, both who directed Lovato's previous video "La La Land". The music video was filmed on June 8, 2009, in Los Angeles, California. It premiered on June 26, 2009, on Disney Channel, following the premiere of Princess Protection Program (which stars Lovato). The video begins with Lovato in her dressing room to prepare for her concert. Lovato is talking to her boyfriend (portrayed by Christopher Mason) over the phone. After hanging up, she rips up a photograph of the two of them together, implying he ended their relationship. He tries to call her back, but she ignores the call and heads to the stage. The boyfriend is shown visiting the concert and after Lovato finished the performance, she returns to her dressing room. He meets her with a rose and they begin their relationship again.

== Live performances ==
Lovato has performed "Here We Go Again" on several occasions. To promote the album, she appeared on The Tonight Show with Conan O'Brien to perform the song on July 17, 2009. She performed it alongside the album cut "Catch Me" on Good Morning America on July 23, while performing "Here We Go Again" only on Late Night with Jimmy Fallon and The View later the same day. The song was also performed during her Summer Tour 2009, where it was the closing song. In September 2011, Lovato performed the song during the revue concert An Evening with Demi Lovato as part of a medley with "Get Back" and "La La Land". She later performed the same medley during the tour A Special Night with Demi Lovato. "Here We Go Again" later included in the setlist of The Neon Lights Tour (2014) and Holy Fvck Tour (2022). Lovato performed the song in Nationwide Arena as surprise song from her It's Not That Deep Tour, on April 27, 2026.

== Track listing ==
- Digital download
1. "Here We Go Again" – 3:46
2. "Here We Go Again (Jason Nevins Remix) – 6:34

== Credits and personnel ==
Recording and management

- Recorded at SuperSpy Studios (Los Angeles, CA), Resonate Studios (Burbank, CA), Safe House Studios and The Jungle Room
- Mastered at Masterdisk (New York City)
- IRH Publishing (ASCAP); Hey Kiddo Music (ASCAP) administered by Kobalt Music Group, Ltd; Part Time Buddha Productions (ASCAP). All Rights Reserved.

Personnel

- Demi Lovato – vocals
- Isaac Hasson – songwriting, guitars, programming, synths
- Lindy Robbins – songwriting, background vocals
- Mher Filian – songwriting, programming, keys
- Dorian Crozier – drums, engineering
- Kenny Johnson – bass
- SuperSpy – production, engineering
- Simon Sampath-Kumar – engineering
- Jason Coons – engineering
- Chris Lord-Alge – mixing
- Dave McNair – mastering

Credits adapted from Here We Go Again liner notes.

== Charts ==
Chart (2009–2010)	Peak position
Australia (ARIA)	129
Australia Hitseekers (ARIA)	12
Canada Hot 100 (Billboard)	61
New Zealand (Recorded Music NZ)	38
UK Singles (Official Charts Company)	199
US Billboard Hot 100	15

== Certifications ==
Region	Certification	Certified units/sales
United States (RIAA)	Platinum	1,000,000

== Release history ==
Country	Release date	Format(s)
United States	June 23, 2009	Digital download
Australia	July 17, 2009	Digital download
New Zealand	July 17, 2009	Digital download
