= Would I =

Single by Randy Travis

from the album Full Circle
- B-side: "Don't Take Your Love Away from Me"
- Released: September 30, 1996
- Genre: Country
- Length: 2:23
- Label: Warner Bros. Nashville
- Songwriter: Mark Winchester
- Producer: Kyle Lehning

Randy Travis singles chronology
"Are We in Trouble Now" (1996)	"Would I" (1996)	"Price to Pay" (1997)

"Would I" is a song written by Mark Winchester and recorded by American country music artist Randy Travis. It was released in September 1996 as the second single from the album Full Circle. The song reached number 25 on the Billboard Hot Country Singles & Tracks chart.

== Music video ==
The music video was directed by Marc Kalbfeld and premiered in 1996.

== Chart performance ==
"Would I" debuted at number 67 on the U.S. Billboard Hot Country Singles & Tracks chart for the week of October 5, 1996.

Chart (1996–1997)	Peak position
Canada Country Singles (RPM)	18
US Hot Country Songs (Billboard)	25
