= Don't Forget (Demi Lovato song) =

2009 single by Demi Lovato

Single by Demi Lovato

from the album Don't Forget
- Released: March 17, 2009
- Recorded: 2008
- Studio: Wishbone, North Hollywood, California
- Genre: Glam rock
- Length: 3:43
- Label: Hollywood
- Songwriters: Demi Lovato; Nick Jonas; Joe Jonas; Kevin Jonas II
- Producers: John Fields; Jonas Brothers

Demi Lovato singles chronology
"La La Land" (2008)	"Don't Forget" (2009)	"Here We Go Again" (2009)

Music video
- "Don't Forget" on YouTube

"Don't Forget" is a song by American singer Demi Lovato, from her debut album of the same name. It was written by Lovato and the Jonas Brothers, who co-produced the song with John Fields. It was released as the album's third and final single on March 17, 2009, through Hollywood Records. The inspiration of the song came from Lovato falling in love with someone who later left her. According to Lovato, it is one of the songs on the album that she most relates to. Musically, "Don't Forget" is a midtempo glam rock ballad that features Lovato singing with breathy falsetto vocals. An accompanying music video was released on March 20, 2009. In 2023, the song was re-recorded for her first remix album Revamped.

Upon the release of the album, "Don't Forget" was well-received from music critics, who noted the transition from her "tween sound" to more mature material. The song achieved moderate commercial success, reaching number forty-one on the Billboard Hot 100. It also reached number seventy-six on the Canadian Hot 100. Lovato has performed the song numerous times including on The Ellen DeGeneres Show.

== Background and composition ==
Demi Lovato – "Don't Forget"
"Don't Forget" is a midtempo ballad and features Lovato singing with falsetto vocals, demonstrated in the sample. The song's instrumentation has been compared to works by Green Day.

"Don't Forget" was written by Lovato along with the Jonas Brothers, who produced it with John Fields. The song features Dorian Crozier and Michael Bland on drums, and Fields on bass, guitars and keyboards. Nick Jonas also played the guitar and percussion on the song. The song is registered as "Did You Forget" with the Broadcast Music, Inc. Lovato has stated that "Don't Forget" is one of the songs on Don't Forget that she relates to the most, and that she felt "a lot of emotion while recording it". In an interview with PopEater, she elaborated, "Everyone goes through the experience of falling in love, but then the other person just walks away, and goes somewhere else. I went through an experience like that and wanted to write about it. I got over it, and now a year later I don't have those feelings about that person anymore." The song and "La La Land" were included as bonus tracks on European editions of her sophomore album Here We Go Again.

"Don't Forget" is a midtempo glam rock ballad sung with vulnerable and breathy vocals in a falsetto tone. According to the sheet music published at Musicnotes.com by Sony/ATV Music Publishing, the song is set in common time with a metronome of 92 beats per minute. It is composed in the key of E major and Lovato's vocal range spans from the note of C♯_{4} to the note of E_{5}. The song includes a "rocking" instrumental and a heavy guitar break. Ed Masley of The Arizona Republic compared the track to songs by Green Day. Lyrically, "Don't Forget" is about one of Lovato's old love interests who left her just as she was falling in love with him. The theme is demonstrated in lyrical lines such as, "Did you forget that I was even alive? Did you forget everything we ever had?"

== Music video ==
"Don't Forget" was directed by Robert Hales. According to Lovato, different video treatments had been written, but she rejected them as she wanted to come up with the idea herself. She said, "They had treatments [for the video], but I was just like, 'No, scratch them.' I want to come up with the idea. I want to show you the colors, I want to show you everything. This is art to me and I don't want it to be somebody else's decision." In an interview with PopEater, Lovato said of the video:

"It was actually really freezing cold [in the rain]. You could see your breath. And I was in the rain for only a short time – my whole band was out there for an hour-and-a-half. It was one of the hardest things I've ever had to do on a shoot. But it went by so quickly. I had a body suit on underneath my clothes, so there's a little fun fact for you. I was trying not to break my focus pretty much the entire shoot, because I was really in that zone – thinking a lot about the position I was in a year ago... thinking about the situation and how much I wanted to get all that emotion off my chest."

Steve Helling of People magazine wrote that Lovato shows her mature side in the video, saying that "it's hard not to notice that the 16-year-old Camp Rock star is growing up." The video begins in a tour bus with Lovato's band. She is seen sitting next to a window in the back of the bus, where she precedes to sing the first lines. As the song progresses, she walks out of the bus in the rain, holding an umbrella. She walks out of the parking lot and into an amusement park, where she stands in front of a carousel in the rain as she continues to sing. After the second chorus, Lovato and her band perform in the rain with the water altering colors in the background. As the last verse approaches, she is back on the tour bus. A single tear rolls down her cheek and the video ends.

== Live performances ==
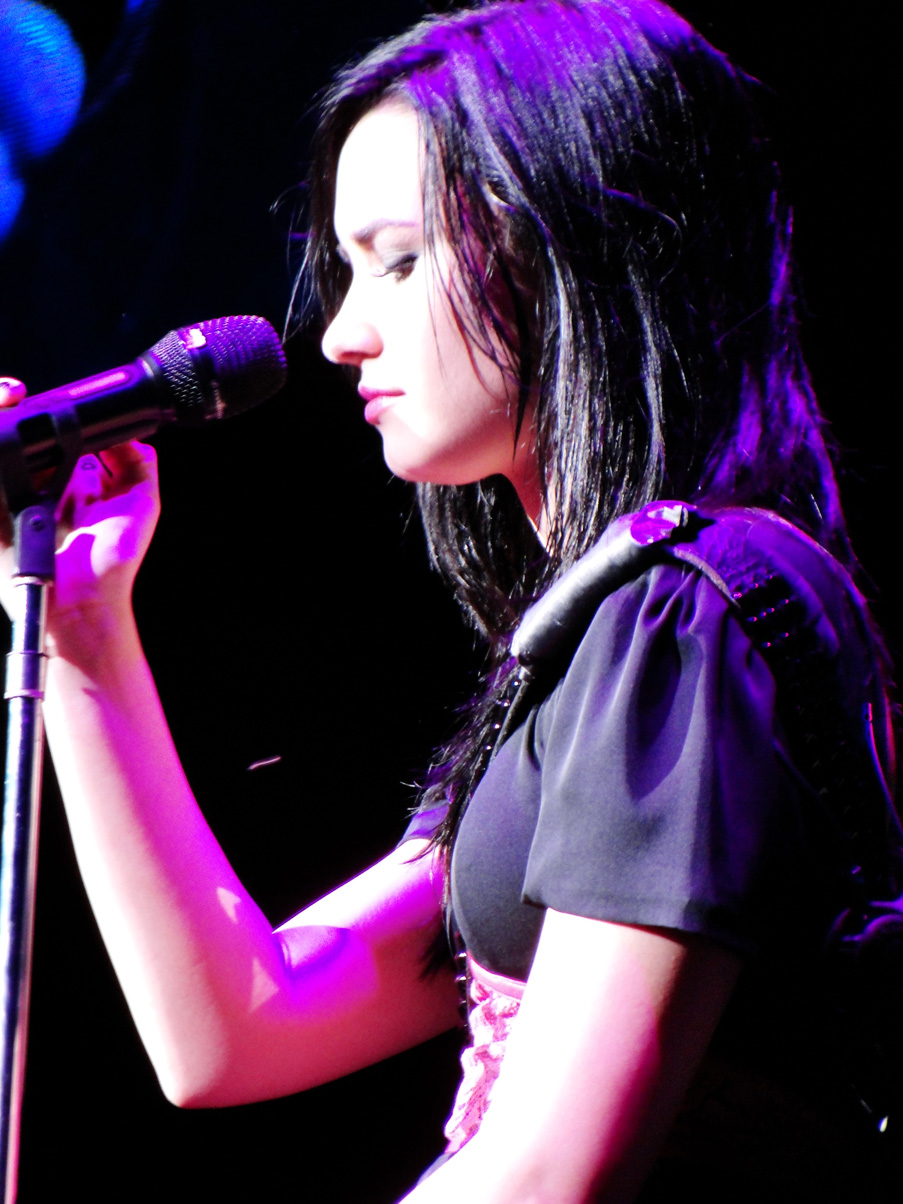
Lovato performing "Don't Forget" during the Summer Tour 2009

Lovato performed "Don't Forget" on The Ellen DeGeneres Show on April 14, 2009. Also in April 2009, the song was performed as part of the iTunes Live from London series. The full performances were released as an iTunes Store-exclusive extended play featuring recorded live versions of the tracks. In May 2009, Lovato performed the song at a Walmart concert, which was later released as part of a live album entitled Demi Lovato: Live: Walmart Soundcheck (2009). The release featured recorded live versions of the performers on a CD, and the full performances on a DVD.

During the summer of 2008, Lovato performed the song in both of her Warm Up Tour and the Jonas Brothers' Burnin' Up Tour, for the latter she served as the opening act. Later in 2009, the song was performed during her Summer Tour 2009. While reviewing a show in Glendale, Arizona, Ed Masley of The Arizona Republic wrote that the song "survived the transformation to an unplugged ballad, making the most of Lovato's most vulnerable vocal performance of the night." In 2010, she performed the song during her South American tour. Lovato also performed the song during her set at the Jonas Brothers Live in Concert World Tour 2010. Scott Mervis of Pittsburgh Post-Gazette wrote that Lovato performed a "high-energy, high-volume" version of the song. In September 2011, Lovato performed the song during the revue concert An Evening with Demi Lovato. Lovato also performed an acoustic medley of "Don't Forget" and "Catch Me" at the Vevo Certified SuperFanFest in 2014. Lovato perform the song on It's Not That Deep Tour as a surprise song, in Washington, D.C. on April 16, 2026.

== Critical reception ==
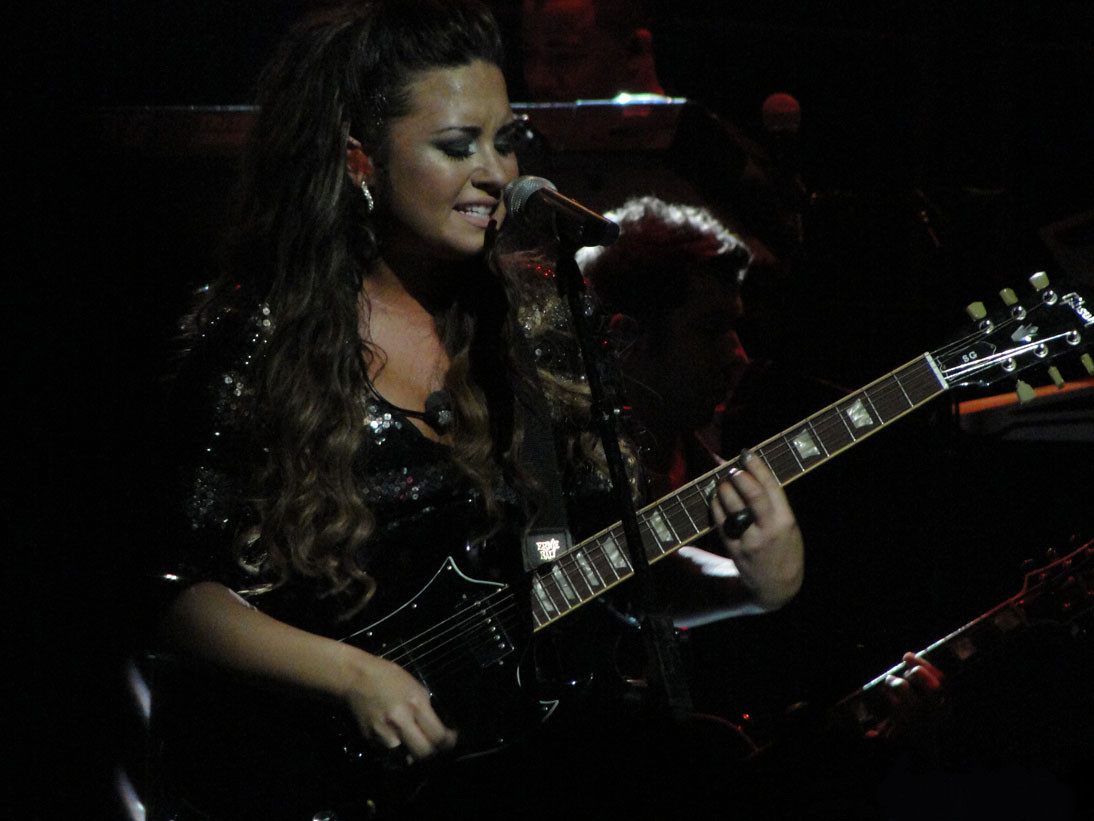
Lovato performing "Don't Forget" during An Evening with Demi Lovato

The song was well-received from music critics. Ed Masley of The Arizona Republic included "Don't Forget" on his "Top 10 from the Disney girls" list at number two, and wrote, "She really sells this epic glam-rock ballad with her choked-up vocals, [...] She wrote it with the Jonas Brothers, one of whom has clearly been enjoying Green Day's latest work. But truthfully, this would have been among the more compelling anthems on '21st Century Breakdown'." Judy Coleman of The Boston Globe wrote, "Lovato has already mastered the limited range of skills required of today's pop starlets: the vulnerable-kitten verse, the banshee-shriek chorus, the stiffly sexy whispered asides. She rhymes 'we used to be so strong' and 'our love is like a song' without irony". Michael Menachem of Billboard wrote that Lovato, like Miley Cyrus before her, "has also stepped away briefly from the tween sound with her album's title track, 'Don't Forget'." Menachem wrote, "She may be reaching a new level with a poised vocal performance, as she too is looking to be taken seriously." Joey Guerra of The Houston Chronicle called the track an "age-appropriate blueprint laid out by Hilary Duff and [Miley] Cyrus".

== Chart performance ==
Due to strong digital sales when the album was released, "Don't Forget" debuted on the Billboard Hot 100 at number sixty-eight on October 11, 2008 and fell off the chart the following week. On April 4, 2009, it re-entered the chart at number eighty-four. The song steadily ascended the chart for three weeks, before eventually reaching a peak of number forty-one on its fifth week on the chart. It was Lovato's best performing solo song on the chart until "Here We Go Again" reached number fifteen on August 8, 2009. As of October 2017, it has sold 1.1 million copies in the nation. In Canada, "Don't Forget" debuted on the Canadian Hot 100 at number eighty-two on May 2, 2009. The next week, it reached seventy-six, which became its peak. The song also reached number sixty-two on the now defunct Pop 100 chart.

== Credits and personnel ==
Recording and management

- Recorded at Wishbone Studio (North Hollywood, California)
- Mixed at Mix LA
- Mastered at Sterling Sound (New York City)
- Seven Peaks Music obo Itself and Demi Lovato Publishing (ASCAP); Jonas Brothers Publishing LLC (BMI)/Sony/ATV Songs LLC administered by Sony/ATV Music Publishing. All Rights Reserved. Used By Permission.

Personnel

- Demi Lovato – vocals, guitar, songwriting
- Nick Jonas – songwriting, guitars, percussion
- Joe Jonas – songwriting
- Kevin Jonas II – songwriting
- Dorian Crozier – drums
- Michael Bland – drums
- John Fields – bass, guitars, keyboards, programming, production, recording
- Jonas Brothers – production
- Chris Lord-Alge – mixing
- Nik Karpin – assistant
- Ted Jensen – mastering

Credits adapted from Don't Forget liner notes.

== Charts ==
Chart (2009)	Peak position
Australia Hitseekers (ARIA)	16
Canada Hot 100 (Billboard)	76
US Billboard Hot 100	41
US Pop 100 (Billboard)	62

== Certifications ==
Region	Certification	Certified units/sales
United States (RIAA)	Platinum	1,100,000
