= Fix a Heart =

Song by Demi Lovato

from the album Unbroken
- Studio: Chalice Recording (Los Angeles, CA)
- Genre: Pop
- Length: 3:13
- Label: Hollywood
- Songwriters: Emanuel Kiriakou; Priscilla Renea
- Producer: Kiriakou

"Fix a Heart" is a song by American singer Demi Lovato, from her third studio album, Unbroken (2011). Priscilla Renea co-wrote the track with producer Emanuel Kiriakou. It is a pop piano ballad that Lovato and some critics described as a break-up song, while other authors noted references in the lyrics about the singer's issues with self-harm.

Critical response to the song was widely positive, with many journalists calling it one of the best songs from the album, while others praised Lovato's vocal performance. Following the album's release, the track peaked at number 69 in the United States and number 78 in Canada. Lovato included the song on the set lists of her tours A Special Night with Demi Lovato (2011–2013) and Future Now Tour (2016).

== Production ==
Lovato started writing and recording songs for her third studio record in mid-2010. She resumed the work for the album the following year, after entering a rehab center to treat her problems with self-harm, among other issues. In June 2011, website Disney Info Net published the songwriting discography of Priscilla Renea, which included the titles of two then-unreleased songs recorded by Lovato, "Fix a Heart" and "Yes I Am". Two months later, the singer announced on her website the track listing of her third studio album, Unbroken, which included "Fix a Heart". A snippet of the track was used on "A Letter to My Fans", a video letter posted on September 16, 2011 and dedicated to the artist's fans. Renea co-wrote the song alongside its producer Emanuel Kiriakou, and the latter also programmed the track and played the piano, keyboards and bass. Jens Koerkemeier engineered and edited the recording at Studio E at Chalice Recording, Los Angeles, while Serban Ghenea mixed it at Mixstar Studios, Virginia Beach. About the song, Lovato said,

"Fix a Heart" is a really emotional song. It's about a break-up, and the first time that I heard it, I cried, because I had just gone through a break-up. I sang the song and pour my heart out into it and I just put myself back in that position to where I was, when I went through a heartbreak. I think every girl, even guy can relate to the song because break-ups can never be easy. Basically, it's just a really great break-up song, and it's really emotional.

== Composition ==
"Fix a Heart"
A sample of "Fix a Heart", a pop piano ballad which has been described as a break-up song.

"Fix a Heart" is a pop piano ballad with a length of three minutes and thirteen seconds. According to the digital sheet music published at Musicnotes.com by Alfred Publishing, it is composed in the key of C major and has a tempo of 54 beats per minute. Lovato's vocals span from the low note of A_{3} to the high note of E_{5}. The singer performs the verses in a low register, while the chorus is sung in a higher note. Sputnikmusic's Raul Stanciu noted that the singer's voice "never go[es] full power, only for the chorus". Similarly, Rick Florino of Artistdirect wrote that the artist "breaks from a whisper into [a] stadium-size refrain". The track has been described by some critics and the singer herself as a breakup song, which is demonstrated in the chorus, "Baby, I just ran out of band-aids/ I don't even know where to start/ 'Cause you can bandage the damage/ You never really can fix a heart". Jenny Chen of Neon Tommy wrote that Lovato "openly admits her weaknesses, including an ability to move on from a broken heart left behind by a former love". Regarding the line "You never really can fix a heart", the artist told Glamour that, "I think every time you get your heart broken, there's a little piece of it that chips away, and I don't think you ever get that piece back. But I think you're able to bandage it with time and with new people and other things that make you happy".

Other publications, such as PopMatters, BlogCritics, and Entertainment Weekly, suggested that the track referenced Lovato's previous problems with self-harm, specifically in the lines "I try to sever ties and I/ Ended up with wounds to bind/ Like you're pouring salt in my cuts/ And I just ran out of band-aids". Jason Scott of Blogcritics noted that, "If [the singer has] learned one thing this past year, it's how to be brutally and often painfully honest". Chris Willman of Reuters wrote: "The metaphors in the tender, fatalistic 'Fix a Heart' should raise eyebrows, given Lovato's pre-treatment history of cutting".

== Critical reception ==
Jason Scott of Blogcritics called it a "gem" and wrote that "Lovato's pain runs so deep that this soul-baring song feels like a punch in the gut". Both Sputnikmusic's Raul Stanciu and Rick Florino of Artistdirect considered it a stand-out track of Unbroken, while Ed Masley of The Arizona Republic ranked it at number 28 on his list of the best songs of 2011, writing, "It's a moody waltz-time ballad whose cello-driven sense of atmosphere places it closer to something Coldplay might have done, although the phrasing makes it sound like she's been getting into '60s soul, her vocal cracking just enough to say, 'I'm feeling this'." Masley also considered it the second best song by Lovato, just behind "Skyscraper".

AllMusic's Stephen Thomas Erlewine selected the track as an album pick, but stated that the honest songs on Unbroken, including "Fix a Heart", "Skyscraper" and "For the Love of a Daughter", were similar to the content of Lindsay Lohan's record A Little More Personal (Raw) (2005). He also criticized Lovato's voice, saying Lovato "doesn't quite have the pipes to sing [those songs] without straining". In contrast, Joe DeAndrea of AbsolutePunk wrote, "Lovato's vocals are unmatched – not only compared to her previous efforts, but the majority of vocalists in general. [...] The emotion throughout tracks like 'Lightweight' and 'Fix a Heart' show the true compassion within her voice as you can feel her heartache pouring out of the speakers". Jenny Chen of Neon Tommy called it "one of the purest, rawest songs" on the record.

Laurence Green of musicOMH said, "'Fix a Heart' and 'Skyscraper' achieve the maturity the album's opening moments were crying out for – trembling, beautiful creations built on sweeping, rhapsodic interplays of piano chords and strings". Adam R. Holz of Plugged In (publication) included the song among the "objectionable content" on the record because of its "sad" themes. In 2015, singer Sam Smith wrote on Twitter, "You never really can fix a heart", to which Lovato replied, "let's do a remake of that song together". After this, the hashtag #DemiLovatoFeatSamSmith became a trending topic on the website. Jason Lipshutz of Billboard stated that releasing a remix of the track alongside Smith would be a "wise" idea. The collaboration, however, never materialized.

== Live performances ==
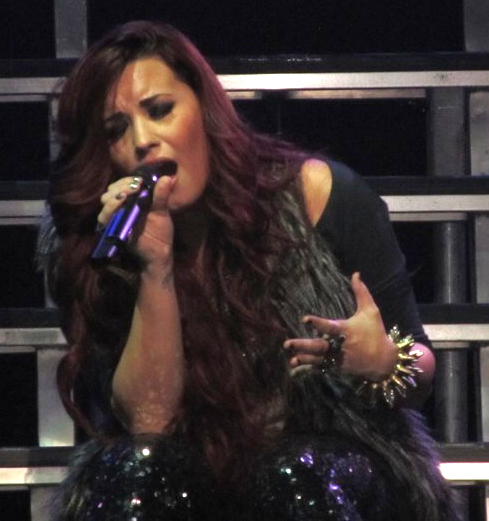
Lovato performing "Fix a Heart" during her A Special Night with Demi Lovato tour in 2011

Lovato included "Fix a Heart" on the set list of her tour A Special Night with Demi Lovato (2011–2013). Before every performance of the song, Lovato dedicated it to those audience members who were heartbroken. A recording of Lovato's tour performance at the Hershey Theatre on November 19, 2011 was released onto the iTunes on January 1, 2012 and was later included on the deluxe edition of Unbroken. Lovato also sang the track on her show at the Iquique Festival in Chile, in February 2012. A video of the singer performing an acoustic version of the song for a private show sponsored by Vevo was uploaded to YouTube on May 18, 2012.

"Fix a Heart" was later included on the set list of the Future Now Tour (2016), a tour co-headlined by Lovato and Nick Jonas. Music Connection Magazine noted that the recording and "Skyscraper" were the oldest songs on the set list, and expressed disappointment over the omission of tracks from the singer's earlier material. It was performed as part of an acoustic medley with "Nightingale" and "Warrior"; the singer starts singing accompanied by a guitarist, while the others members of the backing band join them towards the end. Lovato perform "Fix a Heart" at TD Garden as surprise song from her It's Not That Deep Tour on April 22, 2026.

Regarding the performance at the SAP Center at San Jose, Jim Harrington of the East Bay Times stated that Lovato "outshined" Jonas and that she did "some of her best work of the night on the slower material, touching hearts with the Unbroken cut 'Fix a Heart' and the Demi track 'Nightingale'". Kelli Skye Fadroski of Daily Breeze gave a positive review of the concert held at the Honda Center in Anaheim, California, saying, "Slowing things a bit [after singing 'Body Say'], she pulled a bar stool onto the catwalk and absolutely killed during 'Fix a Heart'". An editor of The Columbus Dispatch praised Lovato's vocals on the show offered in Columbus, Ohio, writing, "Even when she slowed things down with older tracks 'Fix A Heart' and 'Nightingale', her powerhouse vocals reverberated throughout the arena".

== Credits and personnel ==
Credits adapted from the liner notes of Unbroken.

=== Management ===
- Engineered and Edited at Studio E at Chalice Recording, Los Angeles, California
- Mixed at Mixstar Studios, Virginia Beach, Virginia
- Published by Roditis Music (ASCAP), Priscilla Renea Productions/Power Pen Associated/WB Music Corp (ASCAP)

=== Personnel ===
- Lead vocals – Demi Lovato
- Songwriting – Emanuel Kiriakou, Priscilla Renea
- Production – Emanuel "Eman" Kiriakou
- Engineering and editing – Jens Koerkemeier
- Piano, Keyboards, Bass and Programming – Emanuel Kiriakou
- Mixing – Serban Ghenea
- Engineering for Mix – John Hanes
- Mix Assisting – Phill Seaford

== Charts ==
Following the release of Unbroken, "Fix a Heart" sold 37,000 downloads during its first week of availability in the United States, entering the Billboard Hot 100 at number 69 and the Digital Songs chart at number 35. It also peaked at number 78 on the Canadian Hot 100.

Chart (2011)	Peak position
Canada Hot 100 (Billboard)	78
US Billboard Hot 100	69

== Certifications ==
Region	Certification	Certified units/sales
United States (RIAA)	Gold	500,000^{‡}
^{‡} Sales+streaming figures based on certification alone.
