= La La Land (Demi Lovato song) =

2008 single by Demi Lovato

Single by Demi Lovato

from the album Don't Forget
- B-side: "Behind Enemy Lines"
- Released: December 18, 2008
- Studio: Wishbone Studio (North Hollywood, CA)
- Genre: Pop rock; pop-punk
- Length: 3:16
- Label: Hollywood
- Songwriters: Demi Lovato; Nick Jonas; Joe Jonas; Kevin Jonas II
- Producers: John Fields; Jonas Brothers

Demi Lovato singles chronology
"Get Back" (2008)	"La La Land" (2008)	"Don't Forget" (2009)

Music video
- "La La Land" on YouTube

"La La Land" is a song by American singer Demi Lovato. It was written by Lovato, Joe Jonas, Nick Jonas and Kevin Jonas and produced by the Jonas Brothers alongside John Fields, for Lovato's debut studio album, Don't Forget (2008). It was released as the album's second single on December 18, 2008, through Hollywood Records. "La La Land" is one of six songs on the album co-written by the Jonas Brothers, who also contributed backing vocals and guitars to the track. Lovato said that she wrote the song about being herself in Hollywood and not letting other people change who she is. Musically, the song is a guitar-driven pop rock and pop-punk song and the lyrics speak of Lovato feeling "out of place" in Hollywood.

The song was met with positive reviews from critics. Commercially, "La La Land" peaked at number fifty-two on the Billboard Hot 100 and number thirty-five on the UK Singles Chart. The song achieved its highest peak in Ireland, where it reached number thirty on the Irish Singles Chart. It was less successful in Australia and Germany, where it peaked in the lower half of the charts. The song was used to promote Lovato's Disney Channel sitcom Sonny with a Chance and its music video features appearances from her co-stars. Lovato included "La La Land" in the regular set lists to four of her concert tours. In 2023, it was re-recorded for her first remix album, Revamped; it featured American musician Nita Strauss.

== Background and release ==
"La La Land" is one of six songs on Lovato's debut album Don't Forget (2008) that she co-wrote with the Jonas Brothers. Lovato said that it was "important" to have The Jonas Brothers on her album, because "I mean, just look at how successful they are. I would love to have their input anytime, because they're obviously doing something right." The band also contributed backing vocals and played the guitar to the song. It was produced by the Jonas Brothers and John Fields, with the latter also playing the bass, guitars and keyboards. The song also features Devin Bronson, who provided a guitar solo, and Dorian Crozier, who played the drums. In an interview, Lovato explained that the song is about being yourself when you are surrounded by "the pressures of fame". She said, "You get to Hollywood and a lot of times people can try to shape you and mould you into what they want you to be. The song is just about keeping it real and trying to stay yourself when you're out in Hollywood." "La La Land" was released as the album's second single on December 18, 2008. It was later released in the United Kingdom on May 31, 2009, with the new song "Behind Enemy Lines". A CD single was released on June 1, 2009, with a recorded live version of the Camp Rock song "This Is Me" from Jonas Brothers: The 3D Concert Experience. As part of her first remix album titled Revamped, Lovato re-recorded "La La Land" in 2023, in collaboration with American rock guitarist Nita Strauss.

== Composition ==
"La La Land"
"La La Land" is a guitar-driven pop rock and pop-punk song with lyrics about feeling "out of place" in Hollywood.

"La La Land" is a guitar-driven pop rock and pop-punk song. According to the sheet music published at Musicnotes.com by Sony/ATV Music Publishing, the song is composed in the time signature of common time with a moderate beat rate of 84 beats per minute. It is written in the key of A major, and Lovato's vocal range spans from the low note of F♯_{3} to the high note of E_{5}. It has a basic sequence of F♯m–D–E as its chord progression. Lyrically, "La La Land" is about Lovato feeling "out of place" in Hollywood, demonstrated in lines such as, "Who said I can't wear my Converse with my dress?", and "I'm not a supermodel, I still eat McDonald's." Ed Masley of The Arizona Republic compared the track's theme to Miley Cyrus' "Party in the U.S.A.", and the guitars present in the song to works by English punk rock band The Clash.

== Music video ==
"La La Land" was directed by Brendan Malloy and Tim Wheeler. It was used to promote Lovato's then-upcoming Disney Channel sitcom, Sonny with a Chance. In an interview with MTV News, Lovato said that it "really describes the show. I'm excited about that." Speaking of the video, co-director Malloy said, "The idea for the video is to create this hyperreal world, that's the word we keep using, La La Land. Fame has definitely gotten to everybody's head. It's more like [Lovato] is the only one in this world that fame hasn't gotten to." According to Lovato, her Sonny with a Chance co-stars play "stereotypical Hollywood Los Angeles ... big type of people." The video premiered on December 19, 2008, on Disney Channel. It was released to the iTunes Store on January 20, 2009. For the video, the lyric "I still eat McDonald's" was changed to "I still eat at Ronald's". Jefferson Reid of E! Online praised the video, writing, "Mocking Hollywood phonies is always cool by us, and bonus points to Demi Lovato for doing it while rocking out in admirable form. Skewering the "La La Land" machine with sass and grit, Disney's latest everygirl rock star seems like she might eventually give Miley Cyrus a real run for her money."

The video features appearances from Lovato's Sonny with a Chance co-stars Allisyn Ashley Arm, Doug Brochu, Sterling Knight, Michael Kostroff, Brandon Mychal Smith and Tiffany Thornton, as well as Lovato's older sister Dallas Lovato. The video begins with Lovato being interviewed on a talk show called Rumor Has It with Benny Beverly (Brochu). After introducing her to the audience, Beverly asks Lovato what it is like to be a star. A video is then shown to the audience, which serves as the main portion of the clip. In Hollywood, Lovato walks past a "Be-seen section," and bumps into a stranger on the street, which a paparazzo (Knight) takes a picture of. A woman then reads a tabloid magazine with Lovato and the "mystery man" on the cover. The video then cuts to Lovato and the Sonny with a Chance cast at a red carpet event, with paparazzi taking pictures of Lovato wearing Converse sneakers with a dress. Lovato is then shown on the set of a commercial for her perfume, in a pink wig with makeup being applied to her. She is uncomfortable and eventually refuse to cooperate, which angers the director (Smith). The video then cuts back to Rumor Has It with applause from the audience and ends with Beverly praising Lovato.

== Live performances ==
Lovato performed "Get Back" and "La La Land" at the Kids' Inaugural: "We Are the Future" event on January 19, 2009, in Washington D.C. at the Verizon Center. The event was held to celebrate the inauguration of Barack Obama as President of the United States. On April 7, 2009, Lovato performed "La La Land" on the eighth season of Dancing with the Stars. During the performance, Benji Schwimmer and Tori Smith danced along. Barrett wrote that "the frantic nature of both song and dance complemented each other quite nicely." On April 25, 2009, Lovato performed the song on the final episode of singing competition My Camp Rock (UK), where she also presented the award to the winner, Holly Hull.

During the summer of 2008, Lovato performed the song in both the Warm Up Tour and the Jonas Brothers' Burnin' Up Tour; for the latter, she served as the opening act. Later in 2009, the song was performed during the Summer Tour 2009. In 2010, she performed the song during her South American tour. Lovato also performed the song during her set at the Jonas Brothers Live in Concert World Tour 2010. Scott Mervis of Pittsburgh Post-Gazette wrote that Lovato performed a "high-energy, high-volume" version of the song. In September 2011, Lovato performed the song during the revue concert An Evening with Demi Lovato as part of a medley with "Get Back" and "Here We Go Again". "La La Land" was added to the regular set lists to the concert tours A Special Night with Demi Lovato in 2011 to 2013, the Neon Lights Tour in 2014, and the Holy Fvck Tour in 2022.

== Critical reception ==
Fraser McAlpine of BBC Music wrote a positive review of the song and rated it four out of five stars. He wrote, "So, essentially doing a song like this is rocky ground, but the good news is that Demi generally comes across as the kind of bright, scrappy, girl-next-door type, so it doesn't sound quite so preposterous when she insists that she's still quite normal, really." McAlpine concluded his review, writing, "You can almost hear the paparazzi cameras going off as she's singing. ... Of course, the only thing she has to worry about now is that having made this very public declaration, if she slips up for a second, we'll all be watching..." Judy Coleman of The Boston Globe said that Lovato shows "her Gen-Y stripes", and "forcibly rhymes 'everything's the same' with 'the La-La land machine' – pronounced, of course,' ma-SHAYN'." Stephen Thomas Erlewine of Allmusic noted it as one of the best tracks on Don't Forget. Ed Masley of The Arizona Republic included "La La Land" at number eight on his "Top 10 from the Disney girls" list, and wrote, "Are Disney girls just naturally plagued by insecurity or is it all a plot to seem more real? Like Miley's "Party in U.S.A.," this song is all about how out of place Lovato feels in La La Land." The song was added to a retrospective 2021 list of the 20 Best Rock Songs by Pop Stars made by Spin's Al Shipley.

== Chart performance ==
On January 10, 2009, "La La Land" debuted on the Billboard Hot 100 at number 83. The following week, it rose to number 56. The same week, it debuted on the Hot Digital Songs chart at number 42. On January 31, 2009, "La La Land" reached its peak of number 52 on the Billboard Hot 100 and number 27 on Hot Digital Songs. To date, it has sold 935,000 digital copies in the United States, according to Nielsen SoundScan.

In the UK, on the UK Singles Chart, the song debuted at number 63 on May 2, 2009. The following week, it reached its peak of 35, and spent a total of seven weeks on the chart. In Ireland, it debuted at number 30, which became its peak. In Germany, the song debuted at number 82 and spent only one week on the chart. In Australia, it reached its peak of number 76 on May 11, 2009.

== Track listings and formats ==
- US/Europe CD single
1. "La La Land" – 3:16
2. "This Is Me" (Live with Jonas Brothers) – 3:22
- Digital download
1. "La La Land" – 3:16
2. "Behind Enemy Lines" – 2:49
- Digital EP
1. "La La Land" – 3:16
2. "La La Land" (Wideboys Radio Mix) – 3:13
3. "La La Land" (Wideboys Club Mix) – 6:09

== Credits and personnel ==
Recording and management

- Recorded at Wishbone Studio (North Hollywood, California)
- Mixed at Mix LA
- Mastered at Sterling Sound (New York City)
- Seven Peaks Music obo Itself and Demi Lovato Publishing (ASCAP); Jonas Brothers Publishing LLC (BMI)/Sony/ATV Songs LLC administered by Sony/ATV Music Publishing. All Rights Reserved. Used By Permission.

Personnel

- Demi Lovato – vocals, songwriting
- Nick Jonas – songwriting, guitars, background vocals
- Joe Jonas – songwriting, background vocals
- Kevin Jonas II – songwriting, guitars, background vocals
- Dorian Crozier – drums
- John Fields – bass, guitars, keyboards, programming, production, recording
- Devin Bronson – guitar solo
- John Taylor – guitars, background vocals
- Jonas Brothers – production
- Chris Lord-Alge – mixing
- Nik Karpin – assistant
- Ted Jensen – mastering

Credits adapted from Don't Forget liner notes.

== Charts ==
Chart (2009)	Peak position
Australia (ARIA)	76
Canada (Hot Canadian Digital Songs)	70
European Hot 100 Singles (Billboard)	91
Germany (GfK)	82
Ireland (IRMA)	30
Scottish Singles Sales (Official Charts)	18
UK Singles (Official Charts)	35
US Billboard Hot 100	52
US Pop 100 (Billboard)	93

== Certifications ==
Region	Certification	Certified units/sales
Australia (ARIA)	Gold	35,000^{‡}
United States (RIAA)	Platinum	1,000,000^{‡}
^{‡} Sales+streaming figures based on certification alone.
