= Are We in Trouble Now =

1996 song by Mark Knopfler

Song by Mark Knopfler

from the album Golden Heart
- Released: 26 March 1996
- Genre: Roots rock, folk rock, country
- Length: 5:54
- Label: Vertigo; Warner Bros. (USA)
- Producers: Mark Knopfler, Chuck Ainlay

"Are We in Trouble Now"

Single by Randy Travis

from the album Full Circle
- B-side: "Nobody's Home"
- Released: 10 June 1996
- Genre: Country
- Length: 4:27
- Label: Warner Bros. Nashville
- Songwriter: Mark Knopfler
- Producer: Kyle Lehning

Randy Travis singles chronology
"The Box" (1995)	"Are We in Trouble Now" (1996)	"Would I" (1996)

"Are We in Trouble Now" is a song by Mark Knopfler from his 1996 debut solo album, Golden Heart. The same year, it was recorded by American country music artist Randy Travis as the first single from the album Full Circle. This version reached number 24 on the Billboard Hot Country Singles & Tracks chart.

== Music video ==
The music video was directed by Jim Shea and premiered in 1996. It was filmed on the Veluzat Ranch in Saugus, California.

== Chart performance ==
"Are We in Trouble Now" debuted at number 68 on the U.S. Billboard Hot Country Singles & Tracks chart for the week of 15 June 1996.

Chart (1996)	Peak position
Canada Country Singles (RPM)	18
US Hot Country Songs (Billboard)	24
