= Warrior (Demi Lovato song) =

2013 song by Demi Lovato

Song by Demi Lovato

from the album Demi
- Released: May 10, 2013
- Studio: Barefoot Recording (Los Angeles); East West Studios (Los Angeles)
- Length: 3:51
- Label: Hollywood
- Songwriter(s): Demi Lovato; Andrew Goldstein; Emanuel Kiriakou; Lindy Robbins
- Producer(s): Andrew Goldstein; Emanuel Kiriakou

"Warrior" is a song recorded by American singer Demi Lovato for her fourth studio album, Demi (2013). Lovato wrote the song along with Lindy Robbins and its producers Andrew Goldstein and Emanuel Kiriakou. The lyrics deal with a feeling of regret that the interpreter wants to let out.

"Warrior" peaked at number 25 on the Bubbling Under Hot 100 and was certified Gold by the Recording Industry Association of America (RIAA). It was included on the set lists of Lovato's headlining concert tours The Neon Lights Tour (2014), Demi World Tour (2014-2015) and Tell Me You Love Me World Tour (2018).

== Composition ==
Lovato stated that "Warrior" was "probably the hardest and easiest song to write on the album. I was writing about personal experiences, and it's the type of song where you can't fit all of it into one song. But it was the easiest song at the same time because it’s something that I wanted to say." In a review of Demi, Jason Lipshutz of Billboard compared "Warrior" to Lovato's single "Skyscraper", stating that "Warrior" has Lovato declaring herself "a phoenix that has risen from all-too-public ashes", with emotional lyrics such as: "I've got shame, I've got scars, that I will never show/I'm a survivor, in more ways than you'll know".

In an interview on the Late Night with Jimmy Fallon, Lovato said that it is a "very meaningful" song to her. In celebration of the release of the album, Demi, Lovato shared a picture of her shoulder tattoo with the phrase "now I'm a warrior", referencing the song's lyrics.

== Commercial performance ==
Upon the release of Demi, "Warrior" failed to chart on the Billboard Hot 100, but charted for a week at the bottom of the Bubbling Under Hot 100 chart, at number 25. In 2023, the song was certified Gold in the United States by the Recording Industry Association of America, after selling 500,000 copies in the country; it was the sixth song from the album to be certified in the country.

In June 2018, the song was featured on America's Got Talent by a contestant named Makayla Phillips. The performance caused the song to have a 1,780% rise in sales. The song also reached the top 80 on iTunes at the time, achieving a new peak, since it was not released as a single.

== Live performances ==
"Warrior" was included on the set lists of Lovato's headlining concert tours The Neon Lights Tour (2014), Demi World Tour (2014-2015) and Tell Me You Love Me World Tour (2018). It was also performed in her co-headlining concert tour Future Now Tour (2016), with Nick Jonas.

== Credits and personnel ==
Credits adapted from Demi.

Recording and management

- Recorded at Barefoot Recording and East West Studios (Los Angeles)
- Mixed at MixStar Studios (Virginia Beach)
- Mastered at Sterling Sound Studios (New York City)
- Published by Shigshag Music (BMI), Radassyouvich/Pulse Recording Songs (ASCAP), Warner-Tamerlane Publishing Corp. (BMI), Songs of Pulse Recordings (BMI), Seven Peaks Music (ASCAP) and Demi Lovato Publishing (ASCAP)

Personnel

- Demi Lovato – lead vocals, songwriting
- Andrew Goldstein – production, songwriting, programming, piano
- Emanuel Kiriakou – production, songwriting, piano, digital editing
- Lindy Robbins – songwriting
- Serban Ghenea – mixing
- Chris Gehringer – mastering
- John Hanes – engineered for mix
- Pat Thrall – digital editing

== Charts ==
Chart (2013)	Peak position
US Bubbling Under Hot 100 (Billboard)	25

== Certifications ==
Region	Certification	Certified units/sales
United States (RIAA)	Gold	500,000^{‡}
^{‡} Sales+streaming figures based on certification alone.
