= Get Back (Demi Lovato song) =

2008 single by Demi Lovato

Single by Demi Lovato

from the album Don't Forget
- Released: August 12, 2008
- Studio: Wishbone Studio (North Hollywood, California)
- Genre: Punk rock
- Length: 3:18
- Label: Hollywood
- Songwriters: Demi Lovato; Nick Jonas; Joe Jonas; Kevin Jonas II
- Producers: John Fields; Jonas Brothers

Demi Lovato singles chronology
"This Is Me" (2008)	"Get Back" (2008)	"La La Land" (2008)

Music video
- "Get Back" on YouTube

"Get Back" is the debut solo single by American singer Demi Lovato. Joe Jonas, Nick Jonas and Kevin Jonas of the Jonas Brothers co-wrote the track with her while the brothers produced it alongside John Fields, for Lovato's debut studio album, Don't Forget. The song features Jack Lawless on drums and John Taylor and the Jonas Brothers on guitars. Initial writing for "Get Back" took place when Lovato wanted to write a song about getting back together with an old boyfriend, as opposed to writing mean or heartbroken songs. It was released by Hollywood Records as the lead single for Don't Forget on August 12, 2008. Musically, the song is an upbeat punk rock song with a guitar-driven sound.

The song was met with positive reviews from critics. Commercially, it charted at number forty-three on the US Billboard Hot 100 and ninety-three on the Canadian Hot 100. In Australia, the song peaked at number ten on the ARIA Hitseekers chart. Lovato has performed the song on various occasions, including the 2008 Disney Channel Games, Good Morning America and The Ellen DeGeneres Show.

== Background ==
"Get Back" was written by Lovato, Joe Jonas, Nick Jonas and Kevin Jonas of the Jonas Brothers, and produced by the latter three alongside John Fields. Lovato wanted to write a song about getting back together with someone, as she believed enough mean and heartbroken songs had already been made. She said, "It's kind of a fun, upbeat song and it's kind of just fun to sing to the person that I wrote it about." The Jonas Brothers provided backing vocals and guitars on the track. In addition to co-producing the song, Fields also provided bass, guitars and keyboards. Jack Lawless played the drums, and John Taylor contributed backing vocals and played the guitar. The song was released as the lead single for Don't Forget on August 12, 2008, in the United States and Canada via digital download.

== Composition ==
Demi Lovato – "Get Back"
"Get Back" is an upbeat guitar-driven song compared to works by rock band Tommy Tutone.

"Get Back" is an upbeat guitar-driven punk rock song. According to the sheet music published at Musicnotes.com by Sony/ATV Music Publishing, the song is set in common time with a tempo of 150 beats per minute. It is performed in the key of G mixolydian, and Lovato's vocal range spans from the low note of B_{3} to the high note of G_{5}. Ed Masley of The Arizona Republic compared the song's sound to works by Tommy Tutone. Lyrically, the song is about a desire to get back together with an old boyfriend, demonstrated in the lines "I want to get back to the old days", and "Kiss me like you mean it".

== Music video and live performances ==
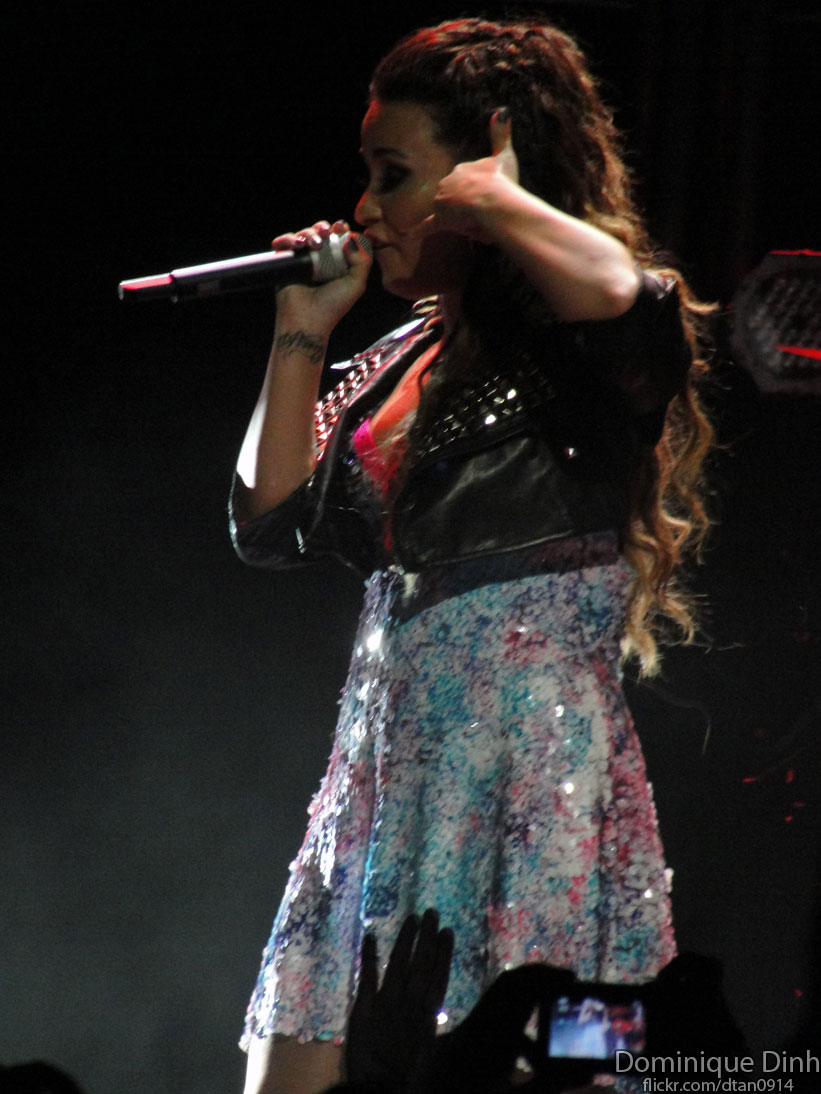
Lovato performing "Get Back" at Club Nokia, September 2011

"Get Back" was directed by Philip Andelman and shot in one day. The video premiered on Disney Channel on August 22, 2008, following the premiere of The Cheetah Girls: One World. It was later made available for digital download on iTunes Store on September 16, 2008. The video begins with a shot of the Manhattan Bridge, Lovato and her band are then seen on a small stage on top of a building. Lovato sports black clothing, a beaded scarf and red gloves. Throughout the first verse and chorus, Lovato dances around on stage with Manhattan Bridge visible in the background. Following the first chorus, the sun goes down and an aerial shot of the city's nightlife is shown. The second verse and chorus are performed during night. During the song's bridge, a daytime shot is shown of Lovato while sitting alone on the rooftop and looking away from the camera. After this, she is back on stage and performing the last chorus during nighttime with bright lights in the background. The video ends with the performance being finished, with Lovato turning around and walking towards her band.

Lovato performed the song for the first time at the 2008 Disney Channel Games on May 3, 2008. Later, Lovato performed the song during her appearances in Good Morning America and The Ellen DeGeneres Show. On January 19, 2009, Lovato performed the song alongside "La La Land" at the Kids' Inaugural: "We Are the Future" event in Washington, D.C., at the Verizon Center. The event was held to celebrate the inauguration of Barack Obama as President of the United States. On April 24, 2009, Lovato performed an acoustic version of "Get Back" in Radio Disney's network studio. Also in April 2009, the song was performed as part of the iTunes Live from London series. The full performances were released as an iTunes Store-exclusive extended play featuring recorded live versions on May 17, 2009. In May 2009, Lovato performed the song at a Walmart concert, which was released as Demi Lovato: Live: Walmart Soundcheck, featuring recorded live versions on a CD, and the full performances on a DVD.

Lovato performed "Get Back" on her Warm Up Tour and the Jonas Brothers' Burnin' Up Tour, for the latter she served as the opening act during the summer of 2008. Later in 2009, the song was performed during her Summer Tour 2009. The song was performed last, and Ed Masley of The Arizona Republic called it "super-charged". In 2010, she performed the song during her South American tour as the show's finale. Lovato also performed the song as the opening number for her set during the Jonas Brothers Live in Concert World Tour 2010. In September 2011, Lovato performed the song during the revue concert An Evening with Demi Lovato.

== Critical reception ==
The song received positive reviews from critics. Judy Coleman of The Boston Globe called "Get Back" a "welcome girl-rock hit". Ed Masley of The Arizona Republic included the song at number eight on his "Top 10 from the Disney girls" list, and said, "She wrote this with the Jonas Brothers, but it sounds more like a Tommy Tutone B-side from the early '80s or the sort of thing Greg Kihn was pining for when he sang, 'They don't write 'em like that anymore'". Masley noted that the song sounds better live, as does "nearly everything Lovato touches". Masley concluded, writing, "When she sings 'I want to get back to the old days,' what she means is when her and her boyfriend were happy, but power-pop fans will hear it as a call to get back to much older days than that." Joey Guerra of The Houston Chronicle called it "undeniably kicky, and Lovato manages some surprisingly credible rock wails." Ken Barnes of USA Today called it an "insidious, Go-Go's-like single".

== Chart performance ==
On August 30, 2008, "Get Back" debuted at its peak position of number at number forty-three on the Billboard Hot 100. The following week, it fell fifty places to number ninety-three. The song spent a total of six weeks on the chart. As of October 2017, it has sold over 586,000 digital copies, according to Nielsen SoundScan. In Canada, it charted at number ninety-three on the Canadian Hot 100, which was its only appearance on that chart. In Australia, the song peaked at number ten on the ARIA Hitseekers chart on May 11, 2009.

== Track listing ==
- Digital download
1. "Get Back" – 3:19
- Digital download (Radio Disney version)
1. "Get Back" (Radio Disney version) – 3:19

== Credits and personnel ==
Recording and management

- Recorded at Wishbone Studio (North Hollywood, California)
- Mixed at Mix LA
- Mastered at Sterling Sound (New York City)
- Seven Peaks Music obo Itself and Demi Lovato Publishing (ASCAP); Jonas Brothers Publishing LLC (BMI)/Sony/ATV Songs LLC administered by Sony/ATV Music Publishing. All Rights Reserved. Used By Permission.

Personnel

- Demi Lovato – vocals, songwriting
- Nick Jonas – songwriting, guitars, background vocals
- Joe Jonas – songwriting, background vocals
- Kevin Jonas II – songwriting, guitars, background vocals
- Jack Lawless – drums
- John Fields – bass, guitars, keyboards, programming, production, recording
- John Taylor – guitars, background vocals
- Jonas Brothers – production
- Chris Lord-Alge – mixing
- Nik Karpin – assistant
- Ted Jensen – mastering

Credits adapted from Don't Forget liner notes.

== Charts ==
Chart (2008)	Peak position
Australia (ARIA)	141
Australia Hitseekers (ARIA)	10
Canada (Canadian Hot 100)	93
US Billboard Hot 100	43

== Certifications ==
Region	Certification	Certified units/sales
United States (RIAA)	Gold	586,000
