= This Is Me (Heather Peace album) =

Studio album by Heather Peace
- Released: 2010
- Genre: Acoustic

This Is Me is the first studio album by British singer/songwriter and actress Heather Peace. It is completely acoustic consisting of just Heather and her white Gretsch guitar. It consists of 9 tracks: 5 covers and 4 original songs.

== Track list ==
1. Ain't No Sunshine
2. I Will Make a Wish
3. You Do Something To Me
4. It's About Love
5. Thank God For You
6. I Can't Make You Love Me
7. Human Nature
8. Never Been a Girl Like You
9. Hallelujah
