= No Promises (Cheat Codes song) =

Single by Cheat Codes featuring Demi Lovato
- Released: March 31, 2017
- Recorded: 2016
- Genre: Tropical house
- Length: 3:43
- Label: 300; Parlophone; Warner Bros.
- Songwriters: Ari Leff; Trevor Dahl; Jackson Foote; Emma Block; Demi Lovato
- Producers: Trevor Dahl; Lauv; Jackson Foote; Max Borghetti; Mokita (add.); Mitch Allan (vocal)

Cheat Codes singles chronology
| "Shed a Light" (2016) | "No Promises" (2017) | "Stay with You" (2017) |

Demi Lovato singles chronology
| "Body Say" (2016) | "No Promises" (2017) | "Instruction" (2017) |

Music video
- "No Promises" on YouTube

"No Promises" is a song recorded by American DJ group Cheat Codes. It features vocals by American singer and songwriter Demi Lovato as well as Trevor Dahl, a member of the group. The song was released on March 31, 2017, and debuted on mainstream radio in the United States on April 11, 2017. "No Promises" was written by the group members, along with Lovato, Lauv, and Loote, who co-produced the song with group member Trevor Dahl, Max Borghetti and Leff, while Mitch Allan produced its vocals. The track reached number one in Israel, the top 10 in Latvia, Malaysia, and Poland, as well as the top 20 in Australia, Ireland, New Zealand, Portugal, Scotland, and the United Kingdom, and the top 30 in Denmark, Hungary, and Serbia. The song is also certified Platinum in the US, UK, and seven additional countries. An acoustic version of the song is included on the deluxe version of Lovato's sixth album Tell Me You Love Me.

== Composition ==
"No Promises" is a house song written in the key of B♭ major with a tempo of 113 beats per minute in common time. The song follows a chord progression of E♭–Gm–B♭, and the vocals in the song span from C_{4} to G_{5}.

== Music video ==
The music video was released on May 16, 2017, on Cheat Codes' YouTube channel and was directed by American director Hannah Lux Davis.

== Live performances ==
Cheat Codes and Lovato performed the song on The Tonight Show Starring Jimmy Fallon on May 22, 2017. Later it was performed on Good Morning America summer concert series on August 18, 2017. Lovato performed the track during her sixth headlining concert tour Tell Me You Love Me World Tour.

== Track listing ==
- Digital download
1. "No Promises" (featuring Demi Lovato) – 3:43
- Digital download (Remixes)
1. "No Promises" (Club Edit) – 4:45
2. "No Promises" (Ashworth Remix) – 3:19
3. "No Promises" (Hook n Sling Remix) – 4:17
4. "No Promises" (Eden Prince) – 3:08
5. "No Promises" (Bassjackers) – 3:50
- Digital download (Stripped Version)
1. "No Promises" (Stripped Version) – 3:26
- Digital download (Acoustic Version) – Tell Me You Love Me (Deluxe)
15. "No Promises (Acoustic Version)” - 3:52

== Charts ==
=== Weekly charts ===
Weekly chart performance for "No Promises"
| Chart (2017) | Peak position |
|---|---|
| Australia (ARIA) | 17 |
| Austria (Ö3 Austria Top 40) | 40 |
| Belgium (Ultratip Bubbling Under Flanders) | 2 |
| Belgium Dance (Ultratop Flanders) | 9 |
| Belgium (Ultratop 50 Wallonia) | 24 |
| Belgium Dance (Ultratop Wallonia) | 1 |
| Canada Hot 100 (Billboard) | 53 |
| Canada CHR/Top 40 (Billboard) | 31 |
| Canada Hot AC (Billboard) | 42 |
| CIS Airplay (TopHit) | 108 |
| Colombia (National-Report) | 96 |
| Croatia (HRT) | 75 |
| Czech Republic Airplay (ČNS IFPI) | 48 |
| Czech Republic Singles Digital (ČNS IFPI) | 18 |
| Denmark (Tracklisten) | 30 |
| Finland Download (Latauslista) | 10 |
| France (SNEP) | 163 |
| Germany (GfK) | 40 |
| Hungary (Single Top 40) | 37 |
| Hungary (Stream Top 40) | 22 |
| Ireland (IRMA) | 14 |
| Israel (Media Forest TV Airplay) | 1 |
| Italy (FIMI) | 45 |
| Latvia (Latvijas Top 40) | 3 |
| Malaysia (RIM) | 10 |
| Netherlands (Dutch Top 40) | 25 |
| Netherlands (Single Top 100) | 35 |
| New Zealand (Recorded Music NZ) | 20 |
| Norway (VG-lista) | 39 |
| Poland Airplay (ZPAV) | 3 |
| Portugal (AFP) | 12 |
| Scottish Singles Sales (Official Charts) | 14 |
| Slovakia Airplay (ČNS IFPI) | 27 |
| Slovakia Singles Digital (ČNS IFPI) | 16 |
| Spain (Promusicae) | 63 |
| Sweden (Sverigetopplistan) | 37 |
| Switzerland (Schweizer Hitparade) | 41 |
| UK Singles (Official Charts) | 18 |
| US Billboard Hot 100 | 38 |
| US Adult Pop Airplay (Billboard) | 15 |
| US Hot Dance/Electronic Songs (Billboard) | 2 |
| US Pop Airplay (Billboard) | 7 |

=== Year-end charts ===
2017 year-end chart performance for "No Promises"
| Chart (2017) | Position |
|---|---|
| Australia (ARIA) | 65 |
| Belgium (Ultratop Wallonia) | 86 |
| Brazil Streaming (Pro-Música Brasil) | 184 |
| Denmark (Tracklisten) | 80 |
| Germany (Official German Charts) | 98 |
| Hungary (Stream Top 40) | 74 |
| Latvia Airplay (LaIPA) | 26 |
| Poland Airplay (ZPAV) | 34 |
| Portugal (AFP) | 37 |
| Sweden (Sverigetopplistan) | 96 |
| UK Singles (Official Charts Company) | 73 |
| US Billboard Hot 100 | 91 |
| US Hot Dance/Electronic Songs (Billboard) | 9 |
| US Mainstream Top 40 (Billboard) | 33 |

2018 year-end chart performance for "No Promises"
| Chart (2018) | Position |
|---|---|
| US Hot Dance/Electronic Songs (Billboard) | 13 |

== Certifications ==
Certifications and sales for "No Promises"
| Region | Certification | Certified units/sales |
|---|---|---|
| Australia (ARIA) | 3× Platinum | 210,000^{‡} |
| Belgium (BRMA) | Gold | 10,000^{‡} |
| Canada (Music Canada) | 2× Platinum | 160,000^{‡} |
| Denmark (IFPI Danmark) | Platinum | 90,000^{‡} |
| France (SNEP) | Gold | 100,000^{‡} |
| Germany (BVMI) | Gold | 200,000^{‡} |
| Italy (FIMI) | Platinum | 50,000^{‡} |
| New Zealand (RMNZ) | 2× Platinum | 60,000^{‡} |
| Norway (IFPI Norway) | 2× Platinum | 120,000^{‡} |
| Poland (ZPAV) | Platinum | 50,000^{‡} |
| Portugal (AFP) | Platinum | 10,000^{‡} |
| Spain (Promusicae) | Gold | 30,000^{‡} |
| United Kingdom (BPI) | Platinum | 600,000^{‡} |
| United States (RIAA) | Platinum | 1,000,000^{‡} |
^{‡} Sales+streaming figures based on certification alone.

== Release history ==
Release dates for "No Promises"
| Country | Date | Format | Label | Ref. |
|---|---|---|---|---|
| Various | March 31, 2017 | Digital download | Parlophone; Warner Bros. | |
| United States | March 31, 2017 | Digital download | Cheat Codes; 300 | |
| United States | April 11, 2017 | Contemporary hit radio | 300 | |
| Italy | April 14, 2017 | Contemporary hit radio | Warner Bros. | |
| Various | June 9, 2017 | Digital download – The Remixes | 300 | |
| Various | August 11, 2017 | Digital download – Stripped version | Too Easy; 300 | |
| Various | September 29, 2017 | Digital download – Acoustic version | Island; Safehouse; Hollywood | |
