= Body Say =

2016 single by Demi Lovato

Single by Demi Lovato
- Released: July 1, 2016
- Recorded: June 2016
- Genre: Dance; R&B
- Length: 3:13
- Label: Island; Hollywood; Safehouse; Republic
- Songwriters: Demi Lovato; Nolan Lambroza; Simon Wilcox
- Producer: Sir Nolan

Demi Lovato singles chronology
"Without a Fight" (2016)	"Body Say" (2016)	"No Promises" (2017)

"Body Say" is a song by American singer Demi Lovato. She co-wrote the track with Simon Wilcox and its producer, Sir Nolan. It was initially released exclusively to music streaming services through Island, Hollywood and Safehouse Records on July 1, 2016, was serviced to pop radio on July 12, 2016, and was made available to iTunes on July 15, 2016.

== Release ==
Lovato announced this song's release on June 29, 2016, through Twitter, writing that she only recorded the song "a couple weeks ago" but wanted to release it "right away" as a promotional single for her tour with Nick Jonas, the Future Now Tour. She teased the song on social media by posting nude and semi-nude, black-and-white photos from the single cover's photo shoot on Instagram accompanied by lyrics from the track. It was then released on July 1, 2016, as a streaming exclusive on Apple Music, Google Play, Spotify and Tidal. "Body Say" was serviced to contemporary hit radio in the United States on July 12, 2016, through Republic Records. The song was released to iTunes on July 15, 2016.

== Composition ==
"Body Say" is a dance ballad with an R&B beat, and explores themes of sexuality and self-confidence. Lovato co-wrote the track with Simon Wilcox and its producer Sir Nolan. The song employs "slinky", synth-y "bedroom beats" behind lyrics, which Zach Johnson of E! News deemed "sexier" than her past single, "Cool for the Summer", that discuss all the things Lovato would do to a lover if her "body had a say." Critics have also made note of the sexual nature of the song given Lovato's recent (at the time of the song's release) breakup with long-term boyfriend, Wilmer Valderrama. Lovato's vocal range on the track spans from the low note of F_{3} to the high note of F_{5}.

== Live performances ==
Lovato debuted the song on the first night of the Future Now Tour in Atlanta on June 29, 2016; it became part of a rotating setlist intended to introduce fans to her single. On September 6, 2016, she performed "Body Say" as well as her song "Confident" at the Made for History Fashion Show, a fashion fundraiser hosted by Anna Wintour for Hillary Clinton. On April 18, 2026, Lovato performed "Body Say" in her It's Not That Deep Tour as a surprise song in Philadelphia.

== Credits and personnel ==
Credits were adapted from Tidal.

- Demi Lovato – lead vocals, songwriting
- Sir Nolan – songwriting, production, engineering, programming
- Simon Wilcox – songwriting
- Tony Maserati – mixing

== Charts ==
Chart (2016)	Peak position
Belgium (Ultratip Bubbling Under Flanders)	35
Belgium (Ultratip Bubbling Under Wallonia)	32
Canada Hot 100 (Billboard)	59
Czech Republic Airplay (ČNS IFPI)	47
Czech Republic Singles Digital (ČNS IFPI)	50
France (SNEP)	135
New Zealand Heatseekers (RMNZ)	2
Portugal (AFP)	50
Slovakia Airplay (ČNS IFPI)	78
Slovakia Singles Digital (ČNS IFPI)	48
Sweden (Sverigetopplistan)	71
UK Singles (OCC)	188
US Billboard Hot 100	84

== Certifications ==
Region	Certification	Certified units/sales
Australia (ARIA)	Gold	35,000^{‡}
Brazil (Pro-Música Brasil)	Platinum	60,000^{‡}
New Zealand (RMNZ)	Gold	15,000^{‡}
United States (RIAA)	Gold	500,000^{‡}
^{‡} Sales+streaming figures based on certification alone.

== Release history ==
Region	Date	Format	Label	Ref.
Worldwide	July 1, 2016	Streaming audio	Island; Hollywood; Safehouse	
United States	July 12, 2016	Contemporary hit radio	Republic	
United States	July 15, 2016	Digital download	Island; Hollywood; Safehouse	
