= This Is Me (Demi Lovato and Joe Jonas song) =

2008 single by Demi Lovato and Joe Jonas

- Solo acoustic version cover

Single by Demi Lovato and Joe Jonas

from the album Camp Rock
- Released: June 6, 2008
- Recorded: 2007
- Genre: Pop rock
- Length: 3:09
- Label: Walt Disney
- Songwriters: Adam Watts; Andy Dodd
- Producers: Adam Watts; Andy Dodd

Demi Lovato singles chronology
"This Is Me" (2008)	"Get Back" (2008)

Joe Jonas singles chronology
"This Is Me" (2008)	"Gotta Find You" (2008)

Music video
- "This Is Me" on YouTube

"This Is Me" is a pop rock song performed by Demi Lovato and Joe Jonas in their roles as Mitchie Torres and Shane Gray from the 2008 Disney Channel television film Camp Rock. It premiered on Radio Disney on June 6, 2008, and an acoustic version was released by Walt Disney Records onto digital platforms on June 17 as the fourth single from the Camp Rock soundtrack album. The song has versions and adaptations in eight languages, and an acoustic version is included in different editions of the official soundtrack. A live version is also included on Jonas Brothers: The 3D Concert Experience.

Written and produced by Adam Watts and Andy Dodd, "This Is Me" reached number 9 on the US Billboard Hot 100. The original version also reached the top 10 in Ecuador and Portugal and the top 20 in Austria, Canada, and Norway. According to Nielsen SoundScan, the single has sold 945,000 digital copies to date in the United States. In 2023, it was certified Platinum by the RIAA.

== Background ==
"This Is Me" is the first song that Lovato's character, Mitchie Torres, sang in Camp Rock with Jonas's character, Shane Gray. Mitchie wrote the song in the beginning of the film, and was later heard (in an acoustic version on piano), but not seen, by Shane, who set out to search for the girl behind the amazing voice. After most people performed already in the "Final Jam" session, Mitchie sang the song (original version) and Shane saw her and sang part of the song he wrote, "Gotta Find You". The two songs are combined to make the original version, as featured on the Camp Rock soundtrack CD.

In the track, Lovato’s vocals range from G_{3} to the high note of E_{5}.

Lovato also recorded a Spanish version of the acoustic version of the song titled "Lo que soy", released on the deluxe edition of Don't Forget and as a video featuring her singing the song while playing the piano.

== Lyrics ==
"This is Me" is about the importance of one's personality and gives a positive message of following one's dreams.

== Release and promotion ==
The song premiered on June 6, 2008 on Radio Disney, and the music video was first shown on June 12 on the Disney Channel. Three days before the premiere of the film, on June 17, the song was released onto the iTunes Store for digital purchase.

Before its premiere on Radio Disney, "This Is Me" was performed for the first time at the third annual Disney Channel Games in May. Beaker from The Muppets was recruited by Scooter to "meep" Jonas' part in Studio DC: Almost Live after Lovato's original duet partner, Kermit the Frog, was dragged off the side of the stage by a jealous Miss Piggy. The song was later part of the setlist for Demi Lovato: Live in Concert (2009-2010) and The Neon Lights Tour (2014). The Spanish version, "Lo que soy", was performed on the South American dates of the Jonas Brothers World Tour.

The Jonas Brothers brought out Lovato to perform the song on the opening night of their Jonas20: Greetings from Your Hometown Tour at Metlife Stadium in New Jersey on August 10, 2025. It was their first time performing the song together in over ten years. Lovato and Jonas perform the song on opening night of Lovato's It's Not That Deep Tour as a surprise song, in Orlando on April 13, 2026.

== Reception ==
=== Critical response ===
In 2023, it was chosen by Billboard as one of the 100 Greatest Disney Songs of All Time.

=== Commercial performance ===
The song debuted at number eleven on the US Billboard Hot 100 and eventually peaked at number nine, becoming Lovato's first top ten on the chart. It left the chart after seven weeks. It would be Lovato's highest peaking single in the US until "Sorry Not Sorry" peaked at number six in 2017. The song also peaked at number 22 on the Pop 100, which ranked songs based on airplay on Mainstream Top 40 radio stations, singles sales and digital downloads. "This Is Me" reached the top 40 in ten countries, including the UK Singles Charts. It is Lovato's 18th biggest single in the UK as of 2022, according to the Official Charts.

As of 2017, "This Is Me" has sold 945,000 digital copies in the United States, according to Nielsen SoundScan, and 200,000 copies in the United Kingdom, where it was certified silver by the British Phonographic Industry (BPI).

== Charts ==
=== Weekly charts ===
Weekly chart performance for "This Is Me"
Chart (2008)	Peak position
Australia (ARIA)	46
Austria (Ö3 Austria Top 40)	18
Canada Hot 100 (Billboard)	16
Germany (GfK)	36
Ireland (IRMA)	27
Italy (FIMI)	25
Norway (VG-lista)	12
Portugal (Billboard)	10
Scottish Singles Sales (Official Charts)	68
Switzerland (Schweizer Hitparade)	39
UK Singles (Official Charts)	33
US Billboard Hot 100	9
US Pop 100 (Billboard)	22

=== Year-end charts ===
2009 year-end chart performance for "This Is Me"
Chart (2009)	Position
Hungary (Rádiós Top 100)	109

== Certifications and sales ==
Certifications for "This Is Me"
Region	Certification	Certified units/sales
Australia (ARIA)	Platinum	70,000^{‡}
New Zealand (RMNZ)	Gold	15,000^{‡}
United Kingdom (BPI)	Silver	200,000^{‡}
United States (RIAA)	Platinum	1,000,000^{‡}
^{‡} Sales+streaming figures based on certification alone.

== "Lo que soy" ==
=== Background ===
"Lo que soy" is the Spanish version of the song "This Is Me" of the soundtrack of the film Camp Rock. "Lo que soy" was included on the Spanish edition of the Camp Rock soundtrack as well on the deluxe edition of Lovato's debut album Don't Forget (2008). The song includes the part of "Gotta Find You", but Joe Jonas does not sing. This version was performed on the South American dates of the Jonas Brothers World Tour.

=== Music video ===
The music video was filmed on January 18, 2009 and it features Lovato playing the piano and singing, while scenes from the movie appear. The music video was released to Disney Channel in Spain, Portugal and some countries of South America the following month on February 20. It was directed by Edgar Romero.

== Other versions ==
- Disney Girlz Rock 2 features the acoustic extended version, performed by Demi Lovato.
- Jonas Brothers: The 3D Concert Experience features a live version, performed by Demi Lovato and the Jonas Brothers.
- The European Bonus Track edition of the soundtrack features the acoustic version and a remix.
- The Indian edition features the version titled "Khush hu main", performed by Sunidhi Chauhan and Sangeet Haldipur.
- The Philippine edition features a version performed by Julianne and Miguel Escueta.
- The Spanish edition features "Lo que soy", the Spanish version of the song "This Is Me".
- The French edition features a version titled "Être moi", performed by Sheryne.
- The Malaysian edition features a version titled "Siapaku", performed by Suki Low.
- The Polish edition features a version titled "Oto Ja", performed by Ewa Farna and Jakub Molęda.
- The Italian edition features a version titled "Sono io", performed by Ariel featuring her brother Stefano Centomo. A music video was released on August 29, 2008 on iTunes. The version was also included on Ariel's 2009 album Io ballo sola.
- Holly-Anne Hull performed the song as the prize for winning My Camp Rock, a show on Disney Channel UK where contestants competed to record a song from Camp Rock and an accompanying music video.
- Martina Stoessel performed "Lo que soy" during her audition for the Argentine Disney Channel telenovela Violetta.
- The third season of the Disney+ series High School Musical: The Musical: The Series features a version performed by Liamani Segura.

== See also ==
- List of Billboard Hot 100 top-ten singles in 2008
