= Demi Lovato: Live in Concert =

2009–10 concert tour by Demi Lovato

- Continental tour by Demi Lovato
- Location: North America; South America
- Associated albums: Don't Forget; Here We Go Again
- Start date: June 21, 2009
- End date: May 28, 2010
- Legs: 2
- No. of shows: 51
- Supporting acts: David Archuleta; KSM; Jordan Pruitt
- Box office: $13,036,332

Demi Lovato concert chronology
- Demi Live! Warm Up Tour (2008); Demi Lovato: Live in Concert (2009–10); A Special Night with Demi Lovato (2011–13)

Demi Lovato: Live in Concert (also known as the Summer Tour 2009) was the first headlining concert tour by American singer Demi Lovato, in support of her first two studio albums Don't Forget (2008) and Here We Go Again (2009).

== Background ==
The national tour began as the Summer Tour, on June 21, 2009, and ended August 21, 2009, covering a total of 40 cities. David Archuleta served as the special guest for the entire tour except for some tour dates at state fairs when David had concerts outside of this tour. David also scheduled solo shows on dates that were canceled such as Louisville and Grand Rapids. Opening acts KSM and Jordan Pruitt also appeared on select dates.

On this tour, Lovato promoted her second album, Here We Go Again. The last three dates of the tour were rescheduled due to filming Camp Rock 2: The Final Jam and eventually took place in fall 2009. This tour won Choice Summer Tour at the 2009 Teen Choice Awards, shared with David Archuleta.

The tour further ventured into South America. In Brazil, tickets went on sale on March 30, 2010, for members of the official fanclub, and then to the general public on April 1, 2010. According to information given by Via Funchal's ticket office, all tickets to the concert were already sold by May 5, 2010, for about 6,100 people, but for safety reasons the number was dropped to 5,285, and in the end all of them were sold out again. In the HSBC Arena in Rio de Janeiro over half the tickets to the concert were already sold or reserved by April 10, about 2,400 people, for a concert of 4,700. In the end, all tickets were sold except for a very few. In Colombia, tickets began selling on April 9, 2010, where 81% of the tickets were sold, and Chile followed on April 12, 2010. However, in Chile, tickets were almost completely sold out as only two tickets were available in the end (100%).

== Tour dates ==
List of 2009 concerts
| Date (2009) | City | Country | Venue | Attendance | Revenue |
|---|---|---|---|---|---|
| June 21 | Hartford | United States | XL Center | 5,102 / 5,102 | $392,065 |
| June 22 | Wilkes-Barre | United States | Wachovia Arena | 3,913 / 4,497 | $255,499 |
| June 24 | Uniondale | United States | Nassau Coliseum | 8,101 / 8,101 | $651,055 |
| June 25 | Newark | United States | Prudential Center | 10,459 / 10,459 | $481,448 |
| June 26 | Boston | United States | Agganis Arena | 5,087 / 5,087 | $393,272 |
| June 27 | Philadelphia | United States | Mann Center for the Performing Arts | 4,247 / 4,382 | $214,358 |
| June 29 | Duluth | United States | Arena at Gwinnett Center | 6,329 / 6,744 | $460,893 |
| July 1 | Lafayette | United States | Cajundome | 3,998 / 4,186 | $355,451 |
| July 2 | North Little Rock | United States | Verizon Arena | 4,545 / 4,545 | $308,778 |
| July 3 | Houston | United States | Reliant Arena | 5,500 / 5,500 | $361,799 |
| July 5 | Grand Prairie | United States | Nokia Live at Grand Prairie | 6,001 / 6,001 | $451,648 |
| July 6 | Tulsa | United States | BOK Center | 12,198 / 12,198 | $696,581 |
| July 9 | Glendale | United States | Jobing.com Arena | 7,111 / 7,111 | $424,482 |
| July 10 | Fresno | United States | Save Mart Center | 11,671 / 11,788 | $532,811 |
| July 11 | San Jose | United States | Event Center Arena | 6,718 / 6,718 | $324,859 |
| July 13 | Portland | United States | Theater of the Clouds | —N/a | —N/a |
| July 14 | Seattle | United States | WaMu Theater | 2,591 / 2,841 | $206,724 |
| July 16 | Sacramento | United States | ARCO Arena | 6,275 / 6,344 | $328,781 |
| July 17 | Los Angeles | United States | Nokia Theatre L.A. Live | 6,096 / 6,096 | $402,077 |
| July 18 | Las Vegas | United States | Orleans Arena | 6,300 / 6,300 | $412,943 |
| July 20 | Denver | United States | Wells Fargo Theatre | 3,801 / 3,986 | $220,188 |
| July 22 | Kansas City | United States | Sprint Center | 7,355 / 7,355 | $406,744 |
| July 24 | Rosemont | United States | Allstate Arena | 11,022 / 11,022 | $776,260 |
| July 25 | Cincinnati | United States | U.S. Bank Arena | 10,077 / 10,780 | $612,576 |
| July 27 | Cleveland | United States | Wolstein Center | 9,124 / 9,124 | $502,059 |
| July 28 | Harrington | United States | Delaware State Fair | —N/a | —N/a |
| July 29 | Greensboro | United States | Greensboro Coliseum | 9,178 / 9,552 | $323,850 |
| July 31 | Tampa | United States | St. Pete Times Forum | 12,600 / 12,600 | $613,941 |
| August 1 | Sunrise | United States | BankAtlantic Center | 11,919 / 12,157 | $599,123 |
| August 2 | Orlando | United States | Amway Arena | 8,431 / 8,609 | $499,123 |
| August 4 | Greenville | United States | BI-LO Center | 3,274 / 3,943 | $126,157 |
| August 5 | Louisville | United States | Freedom Hall | —N/a | —N/a |
| August 6 | Columbus | United States | Ohio State Fair | —N/a | —N/a |
| August 8 | Minneapolis | United States | Target Center | 6,713 / 7,112 | $344,752 |
| August 9 | West Allis | United States | Wisconsin State Fair | —N/a | —N/a |
| August 10 | Indianapolis | United States | Indiana State Fair | ~5,950 | —N/a |
| August 12 | Nashville | United States | Sommet Center | 14,913 / 14,913 | $701,026 |
| August 13 | St. Louis | United States | Chaifetz Arena | 9,395 / 9,493 | $595,699 |
| August 14 | Moline | United States | iWireless Center | 8,762 / 9,116 | $426,393 |
| August 15 | Omaha | United States | Qwest Center | 6,996 / 7,022 | $427,468 |
| August 17 | Grand Rapids | United States | Van Andel Arena | —N/a | —N/a |
| August 18 | Clarkston | United States | DTE Energy Music Theatre | 10,840 / 11,385 | $513,517 |
| August 20 | Fairfax | United States | Patriot Center | 6,129 / 6,517 | $311,120 |
| August 21 | Hershey | United States | Star Pavilion | 4,335 / 8,145 | $172,309 |
| October 29 | Manchester | United States | Verizon Wireless Arena | 4,893 / 5,400 | $496,542 |
| October 30, 2009 | Providence | United States | Dunkin' Donuts Center | 6,132 / 6,132 | $243,381 |
| November 1, 2009 | Atlantic City | United States | Etess Arena | 4,847 / 4,847 | $240,507 |

List of 2010 concerts
| Date (2010) | City | Country | Venue | Attendance | Revenue |
|---|---|---|---|---|---|
| May 23 | Santiago | Chile | Movistar Arena | 11,000 / 11,000 | $612,344 |
| May 25 | Bogotá | Colombia | Coliseo Cubierto el Campín | 5,245 / 5,300 | $365,449 |
| May 27 | Rio de Janeiro | Brazil | HSBC Arena | 9,367 / 9,700 | $461,258 |
| May 28 | São Paulo | Brazil | Via Funchal | 7,285 / 7,285 | $380,883 |
| Total | | | | 325,875 / 336,495 (97%) | $18,628,193 |
