= Demi Lovato discography =

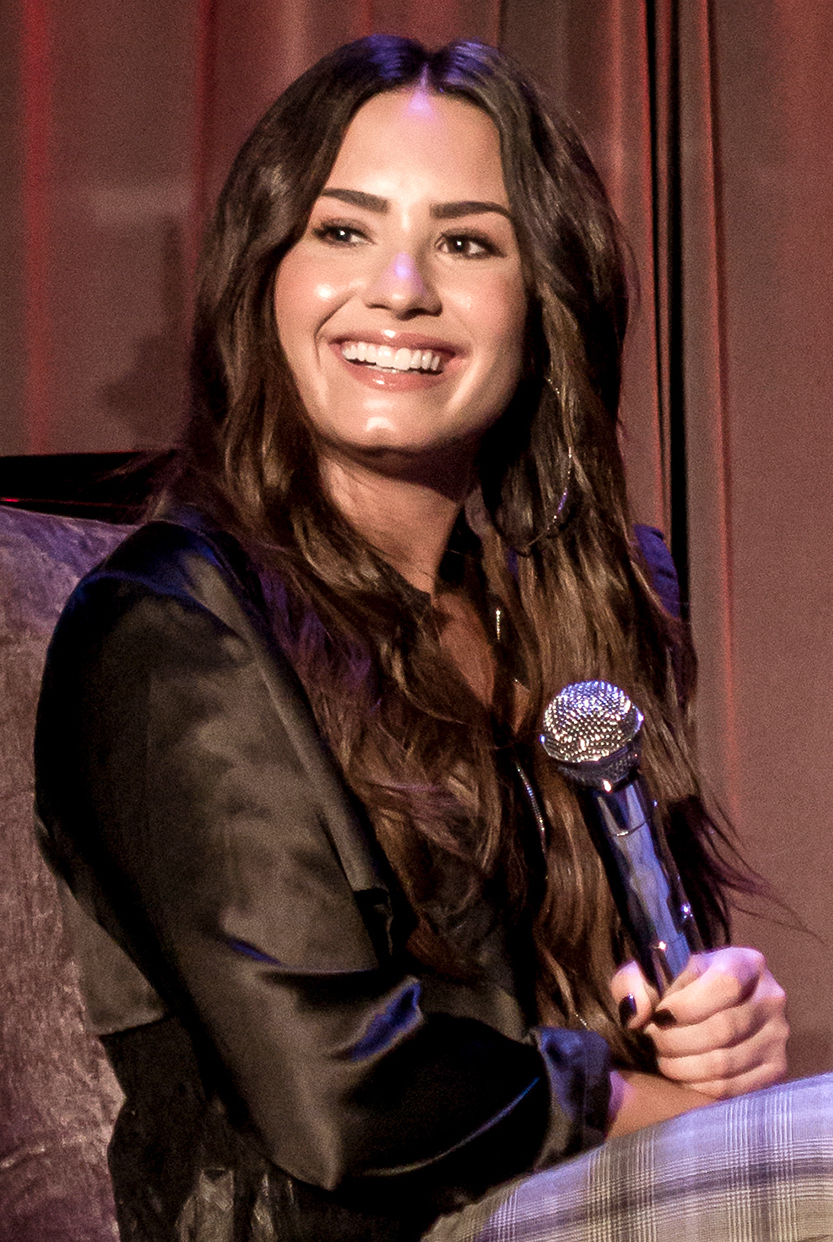
- Lovato in September 2017
- Studio albums: 9
- Extended plays: 5
- Soundtrack albums: 2
- Compilation albums: 1
- Singles: 57
- Promotional singles: 17
- Remix albums: 1
- Charity singles: 1

American singer Demi Lovato has released nine studio albums, two soundtrack albums, one remix album, five extended plays (EPs), 57 singles (including 15 as a featured artist), and 16 promotional singles, and one charity singles. According to Recording Industry Association of America (RIAA), Lovato has achieved 51 million certified units. As of August 2023, she has sold 9.7 million album units and 23.9 million song downloads and her songs have registered 7.7 billion on-demand streams in the United States. Each of Lovato's studio albums debuted in the top-ten on the US Billboard 200, and four of which have received platinum or higher certifications and two gold certifications in the U.S. She has a total of 36 chart entries on the US Billboard Hot 100, including four top-ten songs. Globally, Lovato has sold more than 30 million records.

After signing with Hollywood Records, Lovato released her debut studio album Don't Forget, which debuted at number two on the US Billboard 200. Lovato's second studio album, Here We Go Again (2009), debuted atop the US, making Lovato one of 11 solo artists to score the US Billboard 200 number-one album before turning 18. Lovato's third studio album, Unbroken (2011), debuted at number four in the US, and spawned two singles: "Skyscraper" and "Give Your Heart a Break". The former debuted in the top-ten in the US making her highest career debut, and reached top-ten in the United Kingdom, while the latter was named by Billboard magazine as one of the 500 Greatest Pop Songs Of All Time. In May 2013, Lovato released her fourth studio album Demi, which topped the chart in Canada and also reached number three in the US. The album's lead single "Heart Attack" reached the top ten in the US, Canada, New Zealand and reached number three in UK and Ireland.

Lovato's fifth studio album, Confident, was released in October 2015, her first release after signing with Island Records. It debuted at number two on the Billboard 200 and is certified Platinum by the RIAA. The lead single "Sorry Not Sorry" from Lovato's sixth studio album Tell Me You Love Me (2017), was a commercial and critical success, the song reached number six in the U.S. Billboard Hot 100, and also reached the top ten in Australia, New Zealand and the UK, becoming her most certified song having received a 7× platinum certificate in the RIAA. In November of that year, her collaboration with Luis Fonsi "Échame la Culpa" was released and went on to reach number one in seventeen countries. In 2018, Lovato topped the international charts with "Solo", her collaboration with group Clean Bandit, which became her first number-one song in the UK, Germany and Ireland. In 2021, Lovato released her seventh studio album Dancing with the Devil... the Art of Starting Over, which reached number two on the Billboard 200 and UK chart. In August 2022, Lovato released her eighth studio album Holy Fvck. In October 2025, she released her ninth studio album It's Not that Deep.

== Albums ==
=== Studio albums ===
List of albums, with selected chart positions
Title	Album details	Peak chart positions										Sales	Certifications
Title	Album details	US	AUS	CAN	ITA	GER	NOR	NZ	SPA	SWI	UK	Sales	Certifications
Don't Forget	Released: September 23, 2008 (US); Label: Hollywood; Format: CD, LP, digital download, streaming	2	161	9	77	—	—	34	13	—	120	US: 551,000 (Note: United States sales figures for Don't Forget as of February 2020.)	RIAA: Gold
Here We Go Again	Released: July 21, 2009 (US); Label: Hollywood; Format: CD, LP, digital download, streaming	1	40	5	96	—	—	10	35	—	—	US: 516,000 (Note: United States sales figures for Here We Go Again as of February 2020.)	RIAA: Gold
Unbroken	Released: September 20, 2011 (US); Label: Hollywood; Format: CD, LP, digital download, streaming	4	20	4	22	61	—	3	24	29	45	US: 532,000 (Note: United States sales figures for Unbroken as of February 2020.)	RIAA: Platinum; RMNZ: Platinum
Demi	Released: May 10, 2013; Label: Hollywood; Format: CD, LP, digital download, streaming	3	14	1	4	39	4	7	3	36	10	US: 490,000 (Note: United States sales figures for Demi as of February 2020.); UK: 10,658 (Note: First week sales for Demi in the United Kingdom.)	RIAA: 2× Platinum; BPI: Gold; FIMI: Gold; IFPI NOR: Platinum; MC: Gold; RMNZ: 2× Platinum
Confident	Released: October 16, 2015 (US); Label: Hollywood, Island, Safehouse; Format: CD, LP, digital download, streaming	2	3	1	7	23	8	2	4	13	6	US: 245,000 (Note: United States sales figures for Confident as of February 2020.)	RIAA: Platinum; BPI: Silver; IFPI NOR: Platinum; RMNZ: 2× Platinum
Tell Me You Love Me	Released: September 29, 2017 (US); Label: Hollywood, Island, Safehouse; Format: CD, LP, digital download, streaming	3	8	4	12	32	13	6	4	32	5	US: 249,000 (Note: United States sales figures for Tell Me You Love Me as of February 2020.)	RIAA: Platinum; BPI: Gold; IFPI NOR: Platinum; MC: Gold; RMNZ: Platinum
Dancing with the Devil... the Art of Starting Over	Released: April 2, 2021 (US); Label: Island; Format: CD, LP, digital download, streaming, cassette	2	8	6	36	12	4	12	9	7	2	US: 38,000 (Note: First week sales for Dancing with the Devil... the Art of Starting Over in the United States.); UK: 17,334 (Note: First week sales for Dancing with the Devil... the Art of Starting Over in the United Kingdom.)	BPI: Silver; RMNZ: Gold
Holy Fvck	Released: August 19, 2022; Label: Island; Format: CD, LP, digital download, streaming, cassette	7	47	45	—	26	—	36	19	41	7	US: 20,000 (Note: First week sales for Holy Fvck in the United States.); UK: 6,488 (Note: First week sales for Holy Fvck in the United Kingdom.)	
It's Not That Deep	Released: October 24, 2025; Label: Island; Formats: CD, LP, digital download, streaming, cassette	9	35	—	—	—	—	35	—	—	118		
"—" denotes releases that did not chart in that territory.

=== Remix albums ===
List of remix albums, with selected chart positions
Title	Album details	Peak chart positions		Sales
Title	Album details	US	UK	Sales
Revamped	Released: September 15, 2023; Label: Island; Format: CD, LP, digital download, streaming	60	59	US: 11,000 (Note: First week sales for Revamped in the United States.)

== Singles ==
=== As lead artist ===
==== 2000s ====
List of singles as lead artist released in the 2000s, showing year released, selected chart positions, sales, certifications, and originating album
Title	Year	Peak chart positions										Sales	Certifications	Album
Title	Year	US	AUS	CAN	GER	IRE	ITA	NOR	NZ	SWI	UK	Sales	Certifications	Album
"This Is Me" (with Joe Jonas)	2008	9	46	16	36	27	25	12	—	39	33	US: 945,000 (Note: United States sales figures for "This Is Me" as of October 2017.)	RIAA: Platinum; ARIA: Platinum; BPI: Silver; RMNZ: Gold	Camp Rock
"Get Back"	2008	43	141	93	—	—	—	—	—	—	—	US: 586,000 (Note: United States sales figures for "Get Back" as of October 2017.)	RIAA: Gold	Don't Forget
"La La Land"	2008	52	76	— (Note: "La La Land" did not enter the Billboard Canadian Hot 100 but peaked at number 70 on the Hot Canadian Digital Song Sales chart.)	82	30	—	—	—	—	35	US: 935,000 (Note: United States sales figures for "La La Land" as of October 2017.)	RIAA: Platinum; ARIA: Gold	Don't Forget
"Don't Forget"	2009	41	157	76	—	—	77	—	—	—	—	US: 1,100,000 (Note: United States sales figures for "Don't Forget" as of October 2017.)	RIAA: Platinum	Don't Forget
"Here We Go Again"	2009	15	129	61	—	—	96	—	38	—	199	US: 880,000 (Note: United States sales figures for "Here We Go Again" as of October 2017.)	RIAA: Platinum	Here We Go Again
"—" denotes releases that did not chart in that territory.

==== 2010s ====
List of singles as lead artist released in the 2010s, showing year released, selected chart positions, sales, certifications, and originating album
Title	Year	Peak chart positions										Sales	Certifications	Album
Title	Year	US	AUS	CAN	GER	IRE	ITA	NOR	NZ	SWI	UK	Sales	Certifications	Album
"Remember December"	2010	—	—	—	—	—	—	—	—	—	80	US: 144,000 (Note: United States sales figures for "Remember December" as of October 2014.)		Here We Go Again
"Wouldn't Change a Thing" (with Joe Jonas or Stanfour)	2010	— (Note: "Wouldn't Change a Thing" did not enter the Billboard Hot 100 but peaked at number 10 on the Bubbling Under Hot 100 Singles chart.)	—	90	28	—	—	—	—	—	71		RIAA: Gold	Camp Rock 2: The Final Jam
"Skyscraper"	2011	10	45	18	78	15	—	—	9	67	7	US: 1,600,000 (Note: United States sales figures for "Skyscraper" as of October 2017.); UK: 11,460 (Note: First week sales for "Skyscraper" in the United Kingdom.)	RIAA: 3× Platinum; ARIA: 2× Platinum; BPI: Platinum; RMNZ: Platinum	Unbroken
"Give Your Heart a Break"	2012	16	—	19	—	—	—	—	9	—	194	US: 2,200,000 (Note: United States sales figures for "Give Your Heart a Break" as of October 2017.)	RIAA: 4× Platinum; ARIA: Platinum; BPI: Silver; RMNZ: Gold	Unbroken
"Heart Attack"	2013	10	41	7	—	3	28	15	9	74	3	US: 2,100,000 (Note: United States sales figures for "Heart Attack" as of October 2017.)	RIAA: 6× Platinum; ARIA: 3× Platinum; BPI: Platinum; BVMI: Gold; FIMI: Gold; IRMA: Gold; MC: 2× Platinum; RMNZ: 2× Platinum	Demi
"Made in the USA"	2013	80	—	—	—	50	93	—	—	—	89	US: 312,000 (Note: United States sales figures for "Made in the USA" as of October 2017.)	RIAA: Gold	Demi
"Let It Go" (Note: "Let It Go" was also included on the deluxe edition of Demi.)	2013	38	25	31	65	34	15	—	13	60	42	US: 1,100,000 (Note: United States sales figures for "Let It Go" as of October 2017.)	RIAA: 2× Platinum; ARIA: 2× Platinum; BPI: Gold; BVMI: Gold; FIMI: Gold; IFPI NOR: Gold; MC: Platinum; RMNZ: Platinum	Frozen
"Neon Lights"	2013	36	—	40	—	67	—	—	12	—	15	US: 1,000,000 (Note: United States sales figures for "Neon Lights" as of October 2017.)	RIAA: 2× Platinum; ARIA: Gold; BPI: Silver; IFPI NOR: Platinum; RMNZ: Platinum	Demi
"Really Don't Care" (featuring Cher Lloyd)	2014	26	81	24	—	82	—	—	36	—	92	US: 952,000 (Note: United States sales figures for "Really Don't Care" as of October 2017.)	RIAA: 2× Platinum; ARIA: Platinum; BPI: Silver; IFPI NOR: Platinum; RMNZ: Platinum	Demi
"Cool for the Summer"	2015	11	20	14	33	18	52	31	9	53	7	US: 995,000 (Note: United States sales figures for "Cool for the Summer" as of October 2017.)	RIAA: 5× Platinum; ARIA: 3× Platinum; BPI: Platinum; BVMI: Gold; FIMI: Gold; IFPI NOR: Platinum; MC: 3× Platinum; RMNZ: 2× Platinum	Confident
"Confident"	2015	21	35	26	—	61	—	—	27	—	65	US: 1,000,000 (Note: United States sales figures for "Confident" as of October 2017.)	RIAA: 5× Platinum; ARIA: 3× Platinum; BPI: Platinum; MC: Platinum; RMNZ: 2× Platinum	Confident
"Stone Cold"	2016	— (Note: "Stone Cold" did not enter the Billboard Hot 100 but peaked at number 2 on the Bubbling Under Hot 100 Singles chart.)	—	79	—	—	—	—	—	—	—	US: 303,000 (Note: United States sales figures for "Stone Cold" as of October 2017.)	RIAA: Platinum; ARIA: Platinum; BPI: Silver; IFPI NOR: Gold; RMNZ: Platinum	Confident
"Body Say"	2016	84	—	59	—	—	—	—	— (Note: "Body Say" did not enter the NZ Top 40 Singles Chart, but peaked at number 2 on the NZ Heatseekers Singles Chart.)	—	188		RIAA: Gold; ARIA: Gold; RMNZ: Gold	Non-album single
"Sorry Not Sorry"	2017	6	8	18	62	8	58	17	6	47	9	US: 517,000 (Note: United States sales figures for "Sorry Not Sorry" as of October 2017.)	RIAA: 7× Platinum; ARIA: 6× Platinum; BPI: 2× Platinum; BVMI: Gold; FIMI: Platinum; IFPI NOR: 2× Platinum; MC: 3× Platinum; RMNZ: 4× Platinum	Tell Me You Love Me
"Tell Me You Love Me"	2017	53	—	32	91	92	—	—	— (Note: "Tell Me You Love Me" did not enter the NZ Top 40 Singles Chart, but peaked at number 6 on the NZ Heatseeker Singles Chart.)	—	85		RIAA: 2× Platinum; ARIA: Platinum; BPI: Silver; IFPI NOR: Gold; MC: 2× Platinum; RMNZ: Platinum	Tell Me You Love Me
"Échame la Culpa" (with Luis Fonsi)	2017	47	80	35	6	40	6	12	— (Note: "Échame la Culpa" did not enter the NZ Top 40 Singles Chart, but peaked at number three on the NZ Heatseeker Singles Chart.)	2	46		RIAA: 3× Platinum (Latin); BPI: Silver; BVMI: Platinum; FIMI: 3× Platinum; IFPI NOR: 2× Platinum; MC: Platinum; RMNZ: Gold	Vida
"Sober"	2018	47	50	48	—	34	—	—	— (Note: "Sober" did not enter the NZ Top 40 Singles Chart, but peaked at number one on the NZ Heatseeker Singles Chart.)	61	63		RIAA: Gold; ARIA: Platinum; BPI: Silver; RMNZ: Gold	Non-album single
"—" denotes releases that did not chart in that territory.

==== 2020s ====
List of singles as lead artist released in the 2020s, showing year released, selected chart positions, sales, certifications, and originating album
Title	Year	Peak chart positions										Sales	Certifications	Album
Title	Year	US	AUS	CAN	GER	IRE	ITA	NOR	NZ	SWI	UK	Sales	Certifications	Album
"Anyone"	2020	34	— (Note: "Anyone" did not enter the ARIA Singles Chart, but peaked at number 23 on the ARIA Digital Track Chart.)	64	—	71	—	—	— (Note: "Anyone" did not enter the NZ Top 40 Singles Chart, but peaked at number six on the NZ Hot Singles Chart.)	—	—	US: 54,000 (Note: United States sales figures for "Anyone" as of February 2020.)	RIAA: Gold	Dancing with the Devil... the Art of Starting Over
"I Love Me" (Note: "I Love Me" was later included on the expanded edition of Dancing with the Devil... the Art of Starting Over.)	2020	18	73	30	89	30	—	—	— (Note: "I Love Me" did not enter the NZ Top 40 Singles Chart, but peaked at number four on the NZ Hot Singles Chart.)	65	35	US: 38,000 (Note: First week sales for "I Love Me" in the United States.)	RIAA: Platinum; ARIA: Gold	Dancing with the Devil... the Art of Starting Over (Expanded Edition)
"I'm Ready" (Note: "I'm Ready" was later included on the expanded edition of Dancing with the Devil... the Art of Starting Over and as a bonus track on Love Goes.) (with Sam Smith)	2020	36	25	30	66	13	70	31	28	35	20		RIAA: Gold; ARIA: Platinum; BPI: Silver; MC: Gold; RMNZ: Gold	Dancing with the Devil... the Art of Starting Over (Expanded Edition)
"OK Not to Be OK" (Note: "OK Not to Be OK" was later included on the expanded edition of Dancing with the Devil... the Art of Starting Over.) (with Marshmello)	2020	36	47	41	—	43	—	—	— (Note: "OK Not to Be OK" did not enter the NZ Top 40 Singles Chart, but peaked at number four on the NZ Hot Singles Chart.)	51	42		RMNZ: Gold	Dancing with the Devil... the Art of Starting Over (Expanded Edition)
"Still Have Me"	2020	— (Note: "Still Have Me" did not enter the Billboard Hot 100 but peaked at number 16 on the Digital Song Sales chart.)	—	— (Note: "Still Have Me" did not enter the Billboard Canadian Hot 100 but peaked at number 43 on the Hot Canadian Digital Song Sales chart.)	—	—	—	—	— (Note: "Still Have Me" did not enter the NZ Top 40 Singles Chart, but peaked at number 30 on the NZ Hot Singles Chart.)	—	—			Non-album single
"Commander in Chief"	2020	— (Note: "Commander in Chief" did not enter the Billboard Hot 100, but peaked at number 18 on the Digital Song Sales chart.)	—	— (Note: "Commander in Chief" did not enter the Billboard Canadian Hot 100 but peaked at number 41 on the Hot Canadian Digital Song Sales chart.)	—	—	—	—	— (Note: "Commander in Chief" did not enter the NZ Top 40 Singles Chart, but peaked at number 20 on the NZ Hot Singles Chart.)	—	—			Non-album single
"What Other People Say" (with Sam Fischer)	2021	— (Note: "What Other People Say" did not enter the Billboard Hot 100, but peaked at number 7 on the Bubbling Under Hot 100 chart.)	39	89	—	60	—	—	37	—	58		ARIA: Platinum; BPI: Silver; RMNZ: Platinum	Dancing with the Devil... the Art of Starting Over and I Love You, Please Don't Hate Me
"Dancing with the Devil"	2021	56	—	49	—	46	—	—	— (Note: "Dancing with the Devil" did not enter the NZ Top 40 Singles Chart, but peaked at number six on the NZ Hot Singles Chart.)	—	50		RIAA: Gold	Dancing with the Devil... the Art of Starting Over
"Met Him Last Night" (featuring Ariana Grande)	2021	61	52	48	—	32	—	39	— (Note: "Met Him Last Night" did not enter the NZ Top 40 Singles Chart, but peaked at number three on the NZ Hot Singles Chart.)	88	44			Dancing with the Devil... the Art of Starting Over
"Skin of My Teeth"	2022	— (Note: "Skin of My Teeth" did not enter the Billboard Hot 100, but peaked at number 47 on the Digital Song Sales chart.)	—	—	—	—	—	—	— (Note: "Skin of My Teeth" did not enter the NZ Top 40 Singles Chart, but peaked at number 19 on the NZ Hot Singles Chart.)	—	— (Note: "Skin of My Teeth" did not enter the UK Singles Chart, but peaked at number 58 on the UK Singles Sales Chart.)			Holy Fvck
"Substance"	2022	—	—	—	—	—	—	—	— (Note: "Substance" did not enter the NZ Top 40 Singles Chart, but peaked at number 34 on the NZ Hot Singles Chart.)	—	—			Holy Fvck
"29"	2022	96	—	95	—	—	—	—	— (Note: "29" did not enter the NZ Top 40 Singles Chart, but peaked at number 14 on the NZ Hot Singles Chart.)	—	—	US: 1,500 (Note: United States first week sales figures for "29".)		Holy Fvck
"Still Alive"	2023	—	—	—	—	—	—	—	—	—	— (Note: "Still Alive" did not enter the UK Singles Chart, but peaked at number 55 on the UK Singles Sales Chart.)			Scream VI
"Heart Attack (Rock Version)"	2023	— (Note: "Heart Attack (Rock Version)" did not enter the Billboard Hot 100, but peaked at number 28 on the Digital Song Sales chart.)	—	—	—	—	—	—	— (Note: "Heart Attack (Rock Version)" did not enter the NZ Top 40 Singles Chart, but peaked at number 18 on the NZ Hot Singles Chart.)	—	— (Note: "Heart Attack (Rock Version)" did not enter the UK Singles Chart, but peaked at number 34 on the UK Singles Sales Chart.)			Revamped
"Cool for the Summer (Rock Version)"	2023	—	—	—	—	—	—	—	—	—	—			Revamped
"Penhasco2" (with Luísa Sonza)	2023	—	—	—	—	—	—	—	—	—	—			Escândalo Íntimo
"Chula" (with Grupo Firme)	2024	—	—	—	—	—	—	—	—	—	—		RIAA: Gold (Latin)	Non-album single
"Fast"	2025	— (Note: "Fast" did not enter the Billboard Hot 100, but peaked at number 15 on the Bubbling Under Hot 100 chart.)	—	—	—	—	—	—	— (Note: "Fast" did not enter the NZ Top 40 Singles Chart, but peaked at number 12 on the NZ Hot Singles Chart.)	—	—			It's Not That Deep
"Here All Night"	2025	— (Note: "Here All Night" did not enter the Billboard Hot 100, but peaked at number 13 on the Hot Dance/Pop Songs chart.)	—	—	—	—	—	—	— (Note: "Here All Night" did not enter the NZ Top 40 Singles Chart, but peaked at number 19 on the NZ Hot Singles Chart.)	—	—			It's Not That Deep
"Kiss"	2025	—	—	—	—	—	—	—	— (Note: "Kiss" did not enter the NZ Top 40 Singles Chart, but peaked at number 39 on the NZ Hot Singles Chart.)	—	—			It's Not That Deep
"Low Rise Jeans"	2026	—	—	—	—	—	—	—	— (Note: "Low Rise Jeans" did not enter the NZ Top 40 Singles Chart, but peaked at number 19 on the NZ Hot Singles Chart.)	—	—			It's Not That Deep (Unless You Want It To Be)
"—" denotes releases that did not chart in that territory.

=== As featured artist ===
List of singles as featured artist, with selected chart positions and certifications, showing year released and album name
Title	Year	Peak chart positions										Sales	Certifications	Album
Title	Year	US	AUS	CAN	FRA	GER	IRL	ITA	NZ	SWI	UK	Sales	Certifications	Album
"We Rock" (among the cast of Camp Rock)	2008	33	—	41	—	—	—	—	—	—	97			Camp Rock
"We'll Be a Dream" (We the Kings featuring Demi Lovato)	2010	76	—	—	—	—	—	—	—	—	—	US: 314,000 (Note: United States sales figures for "We'll Be a Dream" as of October 2017.)		Smile Kid
"Somebody to You" (The Vamps featuring Demi Lovato)	2014	— (Note: "Somebody to You" did not enter the Billboard Hot 100 but peaked at number 10 on the Bubbling Under Hot 100 Singles chart.)	14	68	153	—	10	—	17	—	4	US: 278,000 (Note: United States sales figures for "Somebody to You" as of October 2017.)	RIAA: Gold; ARIA: Platinum; BPI: Platinum; MC: Gold; RMNZ: 2× Platinum	Somebody to You and Meet the Vamps
"Up" (Note: "Up" was also included on the deluxe edition of Demi.) (Olly Murs featuring Demi Lovato)	2014	—	14	—	—	17	3	15	9	28	4	UK: 513,000 (Note: United Kingdom sales figures for "Up" as of November 2018.)	ARIA: 2× Platinum; BPI: 2× Platinum; BVMI: Gold; FIMI: Platinum; RMNZ: 2× Platinum	Never Been Better
"Irresistible" (remix) (Fall Out Boy featuring Demi Lovato)	2015	—	—	—	—	—	—	—	—	—	—			Make America Psycho Again (Note: "Irresistible" (remix) was only included on the Japanese edition of Make America Psycho Again.)
"Without a Fight" (Brad Paisley featuring Demi Lovato)	2016	— (Note: "Without a Fight" did not enter the Billboard Hot 100 but peaked at number 5 on the Bubbling Under Hot 100 Singles chart.)	—	—	—	—	—	—	—	—	—			Non-album singles
"No Promises" (Cheat Codes featuring Demi Lovato)	2017	38	17	53	163	44	15	45	20	41	18	US: 64,410 (Note: United States sales figures for "No Promises" as of June 2017.)	RIAA: Platinum; ARIA: 3× Platinum; BPI: Platinum; BVMI: Gold; FIMI: Platinum; IRMA: Platinum; MC: 2× Platinum; RMNZ: 2× Platinum; SNEP: Gold	Non-album singles
"Instruction" (Note: "Instruction" was also included on the deluxe edition of Tell Me You Love Me.) (Jax Jones featuring Demi Lovato and Stefflon Don)	2017	—	72	—	145	31	29	—	— (Note: "Instruction" did not enter the NZ Top 40 Singles Chart, but peaked at number six on the NZ Heatseekers Singles Chart.)	—	13		ARIA: Gold; BPI: Platinum; BVMI: Gold; FIMI: Gold; MC: Gold; RMNZ: Gold	Snacks and Snacks (Supersize)
"I Believe" (DJ Khaled featuring Demi Lovato)	2018	—	—	—	—	—	—	—	—	—	—			A Wrinkle in Time
"Fall in Line" (Christina Aguilera featuring Demi Lovato)	2018	— (Note: "Fall in Line" did not enter the Billboard Hot 100, but peaked at number one on the Bubbling Under Hot 100 Singles chart.)	—	97	130	—	—	—	—	86	99			Liberation
"Solo" (Clean Bandit featuring Demi Lovato)	2018	58	7	14	4	1	1	16	21	2	1	FRA: 21,100 (Note: France sales figures for "Solo" as of December 2018.)	RIAA: Platinum; ARIA: 3× Platinum; BPI: 3× Platinum; BVMI: 3× Gold; FIMI: 2× Platinum; MC: 4× Platinum; RMNZ: 2× Platinum; SNEP: Diamond	What Is Love?
"Monsters" (remix) (All Time Low featuring Demi Lovato and Blackbear)	2020	55	—	—	—	—	—	—	—	—	—			Non-album single
"Breakdown" (G-Eazy featuring Demi Lovato)	2021	—	—	—	—	—	—	—	— (Note: "Breakdown" did not enter the NZ Top 40 Singles Chart, but peaked at number 14 on the NZ Hot Singles Chart.)	—	—			These Things Happen Too
"FIIMY (Fuck It, I Miss You)" (Winnetka Bowling League featuring Demi Lovato)	2022	—	—	—	—	—	—	—	—	—	—			Pulp
"Eve, Psyche & the Bluebeard's Wife" (Le Sserafim featuring Demi Lovato)	2023	—	—	—	—	—	—	—	—	—	—			Non-album single
"—" denotes releases that did not chart in that territory.

=== Promotional singles ===
List of promotional singles, with selected chart positions, showing year released and album name
Title	Year	Peak chart positions					Sales	Certifications	Album
Title	Year	US	CAN Digital	NZ Heat.	SWE Heat.	UK	Sales	Certifications	Album
"Moves Me"	2008	—	—	—	—	—			Non-album promotional singles
"Bounce" (with Jonas Brothers featuring Big Rob)	2009	—	66	—	—	—			Non-album promotional singles
"Gift of a Friend"	2009	—	—	—	—	—			Tinker Bell and the Lost Treasure and Here We Go Again
"Can't Back Down" (among the cast of Camp Rock 2: The Final Jam)	2010	—	—	—	—	178			Camp Rock 2: The Final Jam
"Me, Myself and Time"	2010	— (Note: "Me, Myself and Time" did not enter the Billboard Hot 100 but peaked at number 7 on the Bubbling Under Hot 100 Singles chart.)	74	—	—	—			Sonny with a Chance
"I Hate You, Don't Leave Me"	2014	—	—	—	—	—			Demi (Note: "I Hate You, Don't Leave Me" was only included on the deluxe edition of Demi.)
"You Don't Do It for Me Anymore"	2017	— (Note: "You Don't Do It For Me Anymore" did not enter the Billboard Hot 100 but peaked at number 40 on the Digital Song Sales chart.)	—	4	9	—	US: 12,757 (Note: United States first week sales figures for "You Don't Do It for Me Anymore".)	RIAA: Gold	Tell Me You Love Me
"Sexy Dirty Love"	2017	—	—	7	—	—	US: 8,486 (Note: United States first week sales figures for "Sexy Dirty Love".)		Tell Me You Love Me
"Don't Go Breaking My Heart" (Q-Tip featuring Demi Lovato)	2018	—	—	—	—	—			Revamp: Reimagining the Songs of Elton John & Bernie Taupin
"Unforgettable (Tommy's Song)"	2021	—	—	—	—	—			Non-album promotional single
"Sorry Not Sorry (Rock Version)" (featuring Slash)	2023	—	—	—	—	—			Revamped
"Let Me Down Easy" (with Daisy Jones & the Six)	2023	—	—	—	—	—			Aurora (Super Deluxe)
"Confident (Rock Version)"	2023	—	—	—	—	—			Revamped
"You'll Be OK, Kid"	2024	—	—	—	—	—			Non-album promotional single
"Frequency"	2026	—	—	—	—	— (Note: "Frequency" did not enter the UK Singles Chart, but peaked at number 64 on the UK Singles Sales Chart.)			It's Not That Deep
"—" denotes releases that did not chart in that territory.

=== Charity singles ===
List of charity singles, with selected chart positions, showing year released
Title	Year	Peak chart positions	Sales
Title	Year	US	Sales
"Send It On" (with Miley Cyrus, Jonas Brothers and Selena Gomez)	2009	20	US: 472,000 (Note: United States sales figures for "Send It On" as of April 2010.)
"Make a Wave" (with Joe Jonas)	2010	84	
"Swine"	2023	— (Note: "Swine" did not enter the Billboard Hot 100, but peaked at number 12 on the Alternative Dugital Song Sales chart.)	
"—" denotes releases that did not chart in that territory.

== Other charted or certified songs ==
List of songs, with selected chart positions, showing year released and album name
Title	Year	Peak chart positions							Sales	Certifications	Album
Title	Year	US	CAN	ITA	NZ Hot	NGR	UK	US Dance/ Pop	Sales	Certifications	Album
"Who Will I Be"	2008	— (Note: "Who Will I Be?" did not enter the Billboard Hot 100, but peaked at number one on the Bubbling Under Hot 100 Singles chart.)	80	—	—	*	169	—			Camp Rock
"On the Line" (featuring Jonas Brothers)	2008	100	—	—	—	*	—	—			Don't Forget
"One and the Same" (with Selena Gomez)	2009	82	—	—	—	*	—	—	US: 336,000 (Note: United States sales figures for "One and the Same" as of October 2017.)		Disney Channel Playlist
"Catch Me"	2009	89	—	—	—	*	—	—	US: 294,000 (Note: United States sales figures for "Catch Me" as of October 2017.)		Here We Go Again
"Fix a Heart"	2011	69	78	—	—	*	—	—	US: 37,000 (Note: First week sales for "Fix a Heart" in the United States.)	RIAA: Gold	Unbroken
"Unbroken"	2011	98	—	—	—	*	—	—			Unbroken
"All Night Long" (featuring Missy Elliott and Timbaland)	2011	— (Note: "All Night Long" did not enter the Billboard Hot 100, but peaked at number 24 on the Bubbling Under Hot 100 Singles chart.)	—	—	—	*	—	—			Unbroken
"Lightweight"	2011	— (Note: "Lightweight" did not enter the Billboard Hot 100, but peaked at number 23 on the Bubbling Under Hot 100 Singles chart.)	—	—	—	*	—	—			Unbroken
"Warrior"	2013	— (Note: "Warrior" did not enter the Billboard Hot 100, but peaked at number 25 on the Bubbling Under Hot 100 Singles chart.)	—	—	—	*	—	—		RIAA: Gold	Demi
"Heart by Heart"	2013	—	86	83	—	*	115	—			The Mortal Instruments: City of Bones
"In the Mirror"	2020	—	—	—	—	—	— (Note: "In the Mirror" did not enter the UK Singles Chart, but peaked at number 77 on the UK Singles Sales Chart.)	—			Eurovision Song Contest: The Story of Fire Saga
"The Art of Starting Over"	2021	—	—	—	22	—	—	—			Dancing with the Devil... the Art of Starting Over
"Easy" (with Noah Cyrus)	2021	—	—	—	18	—	—	—			Dancing with the Devil... the Art of Starting Over
"Let You Go"	2025	— (Note: "Let You Go" did not enter the Billboard Hot 100, but peaked at number 10 on the Hot Dance/Pop Songs chart.)	—	—	26	—	—	10			It's Not That Deep
"Ghost"	2025	— (Note: "Ghost" did not enter the Billboard Hot 100, but peaked at number 14 on the Dance Digital Song Sales chart.)	—	—	—	—	—	—			It's Not That Deep
"Confetti"	2025	— (Note: "Confetti" did not enter the Billboard Hot 100, but peaked at number 5 on the Dance Digital Song Sales chart.)	—	—	—	—	—	—			It's Not That Deep
"Fantasy" (featuring Cobrah)	2026	—	—	—	—	98	—	—			It's Not That Deep (Unless You Want It to Be)
"—" denotes releases that did not chart in that territory. "*" denotes that the chart did not exist at that time.

== See also ==
- Demi Lovato videography
- List of songs recorded by Demi Lovato
