= It's Not That Deep Tour =

2026 concert tour by Demi Lovato

- Tour by Demi Lovato
- Promotional graphic
- Location: Canada; U.S.
- Associated album: It's Not That Deep
- Start date: April 13, 2026
- End date: May 25, 2026
- No. of shows: 19
- Supporting act: Adéla

Demi Lovato concert chronology
- Holy Fvck Tour (2022); It's Not That Deep Tour (2026)

The It's Not That Deep Tour was the eighth concert tour by the American singer Demi Lovato. Produced by Live Nation Entertainment, it is in support of her ninth studio album, It's Not That Deep (2025). Consisting of 19 dates, it commenced in Orlando, Florida, on April 13, 2026, and concluded in Houston, Texas, on May 25 of the same year.

== Background ==
Lovato performed a concert on October 25, 2025 at the Hollywood Palladium, Los Angeles, billed as "One Night Only at the Palladium" to celebrate the release of her ninth studio album, It's Not That Deep. Rolling Out reported that more than 200,000 people joined the online ticketing queue for the concert and the tickets were sold out within twenty minutes. After the concert, several arenas posted a picture on their social media showing the lyrics of "Here All Night"—"I'll be here all night"—projected onto the LED billboards and other displays, hinting at a tour announcement.

On October 27, 2025, Lovato announced the tour, with 23 shows across North America spanning from April through May 2026. Tickets went on sale four days later, with an artist pre-sale which runs one day prior to the general dale dates. Slovak singer and songwriter Adéla was announced to be the opening act.

Lovato announced on February 10, 2026, the cancelation of five tour dates to "rest and rehearse," including the originally scheduled opening show on April 8, 2026, in Charlotte, North Carolina. The tour later commenced on April 13, 2026, in Orlando, Florida. In May of the same year, four additional concerts were announced.

== Critical reception ==
Writing for The Hollywood Reporter, Tomás Mier reviewed the opening date in Orlando, describing it as "extra special" and noting that Lovato "found the freedom of finally being comfortable in her own skin". Grayson Keglovic of Orlando Weekly also reviewed the show, commending Lovato's "powerhouse" vocal performance. She further praised the background dancers, noting that they "stole the show". Reviewing the show in Washington D.C., Melissa Ruggieri of USA Today said that Lovato was "taking a well-earned victory lap". Autumn Sloboda, writing for Boston.com, highlighted the performances of her older tracks, noting that "the songs that landed hardest were the ones that came with years of memories attached". Aisling Murphy of The Globe and Mail gave the show in Toronto a more mixed review and commented it felt "a bit forced". She also called it a "pastiche" of Charli XCX's Brat Tour. Kyle Denis of Billboard praised Lovato's "jaw-dropping" vocal performances during the show in New York City and described it as a "triumphant show".

== Set list ==
This set list is from the concert in Orlando on April 13, 2026.

1. "Fast"
2. "Kiss"
3. "Frequency"
4. "Heart Attack"
5. "Tell Me You Love Me"
6. "Confident"
7. "Low Rise Jeans"
8. "Fantasy" / "Solo"
9. "Skyscraper"
10. "Give Your Heart a Break"
11. "Say It"
12. "Little Bit"
13. "Ghost"
14. "Here All Night"
15. "Joshua Tree"
16. Surprise song
17. "Let You Go"
18. "Stone Cold"
19. "Sorry Not Sorry"
20. "Really Don't Care"
21. "Sorry to Myself"
22. "Cool for the Summer"

=== Surprise songs ===
- April 13, 2026 – Orlando: "This Is Me" and "On the Line" (with Joe Jonas)
- April 16, 2026 – Washington, D.C.: "Don't Forget"
- April 18, 2026 – Philadelphia: "Body Say"
- April 20, 2026 – Toronto: "Catch Me"
- April 22, 2026 – Boston: "Fix a Heart"
- April 24, 2026 – New York City: "Iris" (with Jutes) and "Too Little Too Late" (with JoJo)
- April 27, 2026 – Columbus: "Here We Go Again"
- April 28, 2026 – Detroit: "Anyone"
- May 1, 2026 – Chicago: "Get Back"
- May 2, 2026 – Minneapolis: "Don't Forget"
- May 9, 2026 – Anaheim: "For You"
- May 11, 2026 – San Francisco: "Happy Ending"
- May 13, 2026 – Seattle: "La La Land"
- May 22, 2026 – Dallas: "Échame la Culpa" (with Luis Fonsi)
- May 24, 2026 – Austin: "Love Controller"
- May 25, 2026 – Houston: "4 Ever 4 Me" Entre Dos Tierras (with Planeta Del Sur)

== Tour dates ==
List of 2026 concerts
Date (2026)	City	Country	Venue	Supporting acts	Attendance	Revenue
April 13 (Note: The April 13, 2026, concert was originally scheduled for April 10, but was rescheduled following the cancelation of five other concerts, and to allow for additional rehearsal time.)	Orlando	United States	Kia Center	Adéla	—	—
April 16	Washington, D.C.	United States	Capital One Arena	Adéla	6,326 / 6,657	$688,127
April 18	Philadelphia	United States	Xfinity Mobile Arena	Adéla	—	—
April 20	Toronto	Canada	Scotiabank Arena	Adéla	—	—
April 22	Boston	United States	TD Garden	Adéla	11,086 / 11,086	$849,034
April 24	New York City	United States	Madison Square Garden	Adéla	12,733 / 12,733	$1,249,023
April 27	Columbus	United States	Nationwide Arena	Adéla	—	—
April 28 (Note: The April 28, 2026, concert was originally scheduled for April 29, but was rescheduled due to the 2026 NBA playoffs.)	Detroit	United States	Little Caesars Arena	Adéla	—	—
May 1	Chicago	United States	United Center	Adéla	—	—
May 2	Minneapolis	United States	Target Center	Adéla	—	—
May 9	Anaheim	United States	Honda Center	Adéla	—	—
May 11	San Francisco	United States	Chase Center	Adéla	8,239 / 8,959	$768,248
May 13	Seattle	United States	Climate Pledge Arena	Adéla	7,153 / 7,990	$606,900
May 16	Inglewood (Note: Promoted as Los Angeles in promotional material.)	United States	Kia Forum	Adéla	—	—
May 17	Highland	United States	Yaamava' Theater	Adéla	—	—
May 19	Glendale	United States	Desert Diamond Arena	Adéla	—	—
May 22	Dallas	United States	American Airlines Center	Adéla	—	—
May 24	Austin	United States	Moody Center	Adéla	—	—
May 25	Houston	United States	Toyota Center	Adéla	—	—
Total					45,537 / 47,425 (96%)	$4,161,332

=== Canceled shows ===
List of canceled concerts
Date (2026)	City	Country	Venue	Reason	Ref.
April 8	Charlotte	United States	Spectrum Center	Personal health concerns	
April 12	Atlanta	United States	State Farm Arena	Personal health concerns	
April 14	Nashville	United States	Bridgestone Arena	Personal health concerns	
May 5	Denver	United States	Ball Arena	Personal health concerns	
May 8	Paradise (Note: Promoted as Las Vegas in promotional material.)	United States	MGM Grand Garden Arena	Personal health concerns	
