= Demi Lovato videography =

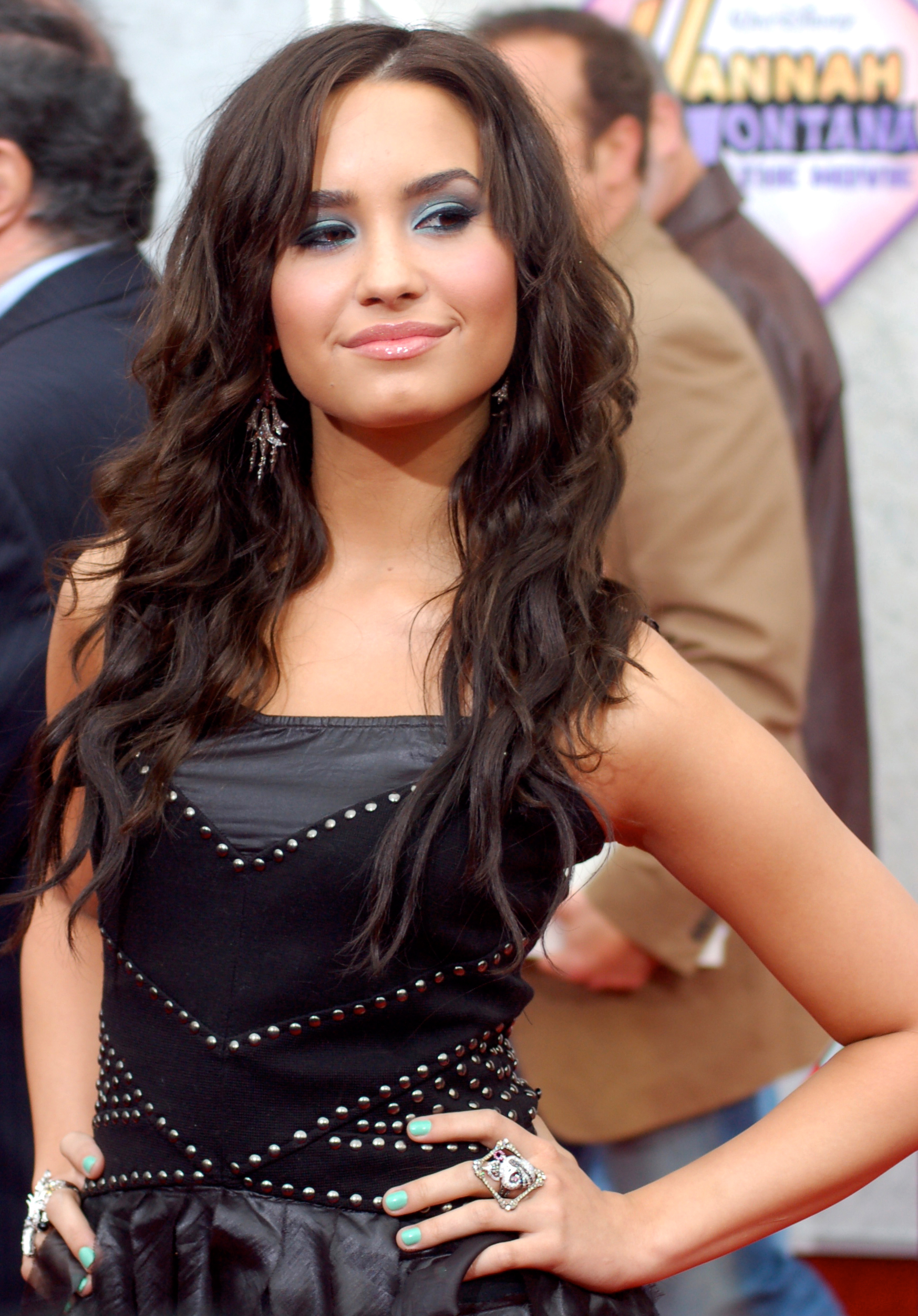
Lovato in 2009 attending the premiere for Hannah Montana: The Movie

American singer and actress Demi Lovato has released two video albums and appeared in various music videos, films, and television shows. From her debut album Don't Forget (2008), she released music videos for its eponymous single as well as "Get Back" and "La La Land". Lovato released her second album Here We Go Again in 2009, producing music videos for the eponymous single and "Remember December". Her third studio album Unbroken (2011) spawned music videos for "Skyscraper", which won Best Video with a Message at the 2012 MTV Video Music Awards, and "Give Your Heart a Break". She then released her fourth studio album Demi (2013), which was accompanied by music videos for "Heart Attack", which was nominated for Best Female Video at the 2013 MTV Video Music Awards, "Made in the USA", "Neon Lights", and "Really Don't Care".

After signing a record deal with Island Records, Lovato released her fifth studio album Confident (2015), along with three music videos for the songs "Cool for the Summer", "Confident", and "Stone Cold". A sixth studio album, Tell Me You Love Me followed in 2017. It produced music videos for "Sorry Not Sorry", which was nominated for Best Pop Video at the 2018 MTV Video Music Awards, and "Tell Me You Love Me".

Lovato's first acting role was on Barney & Friends from 2002 to 2004 as the character Angela. She then joined the Disney Channel, starring as Charlotte Adams during the first season of As the Bell Rings and had her breakthrough by playing Mitchie Torres in the films Camp Rock (2008), Camp Rock 2: The Final Jam (2010) and Camp Rock 3 (2026), as well as the title character in Sonny with a Chance (2009–2011). Her subsequent television work included serving as a judge for two seasons on The X Factor (2012–2013) as well as recurring roles on Glee (2013–2014) and Will & Grace (2020). In film, she has had roles in Princess Protection Program (2009), Smurfs: The Lost Village (2017), Charming (2018), and Eurovision Song Contest: The Story of Fire Saga (2020). Lovato additionally has been the main focus of the documentaries Demi Lovato: Stay Strong (2012), Demi Lovato: Simply Complicated (2017) and Demi Lovato: Dancing with the Devil (2021), and served as executive producer on the two latter as well as the documentary Beyond Silence (2017).

== Music videos ==
Key
•	Denotes music videos directed or co-directed by Demi Lovato

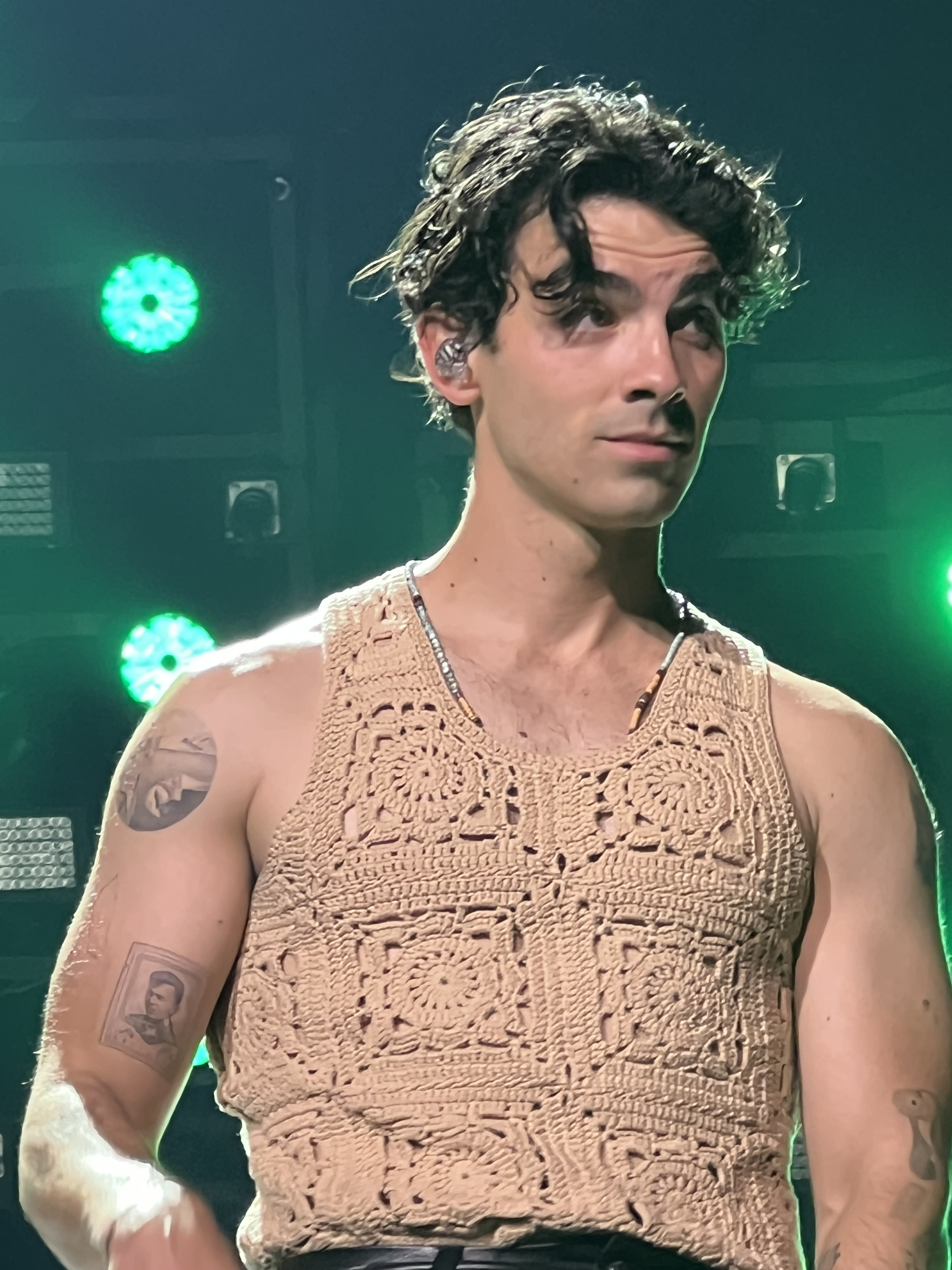
Lovato collaborated with Joe Jonas (pictured) on multiple songs early in her career.

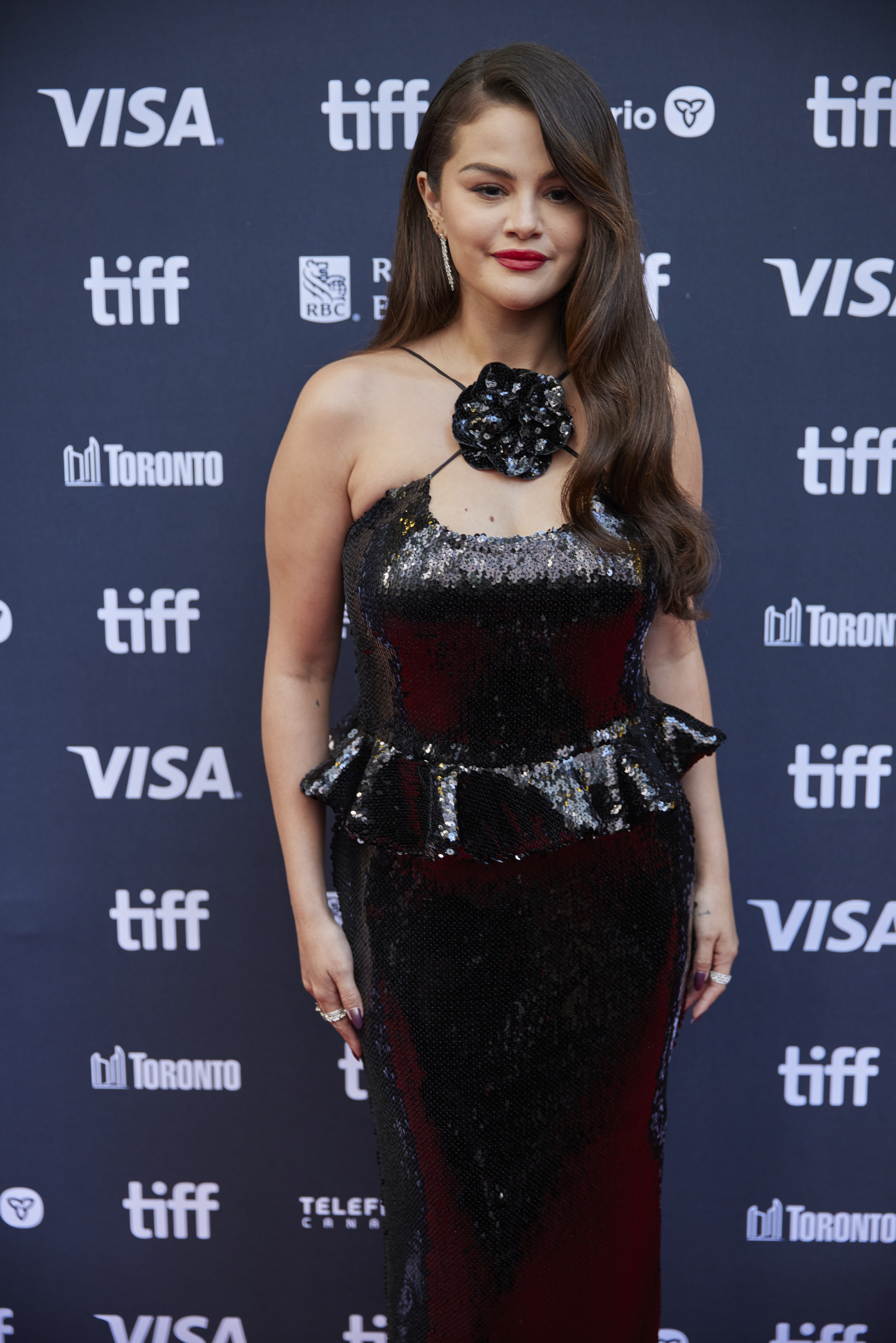
Lovato collaborated with Selena Gomez (pictured) on multiple songs early in their careers.

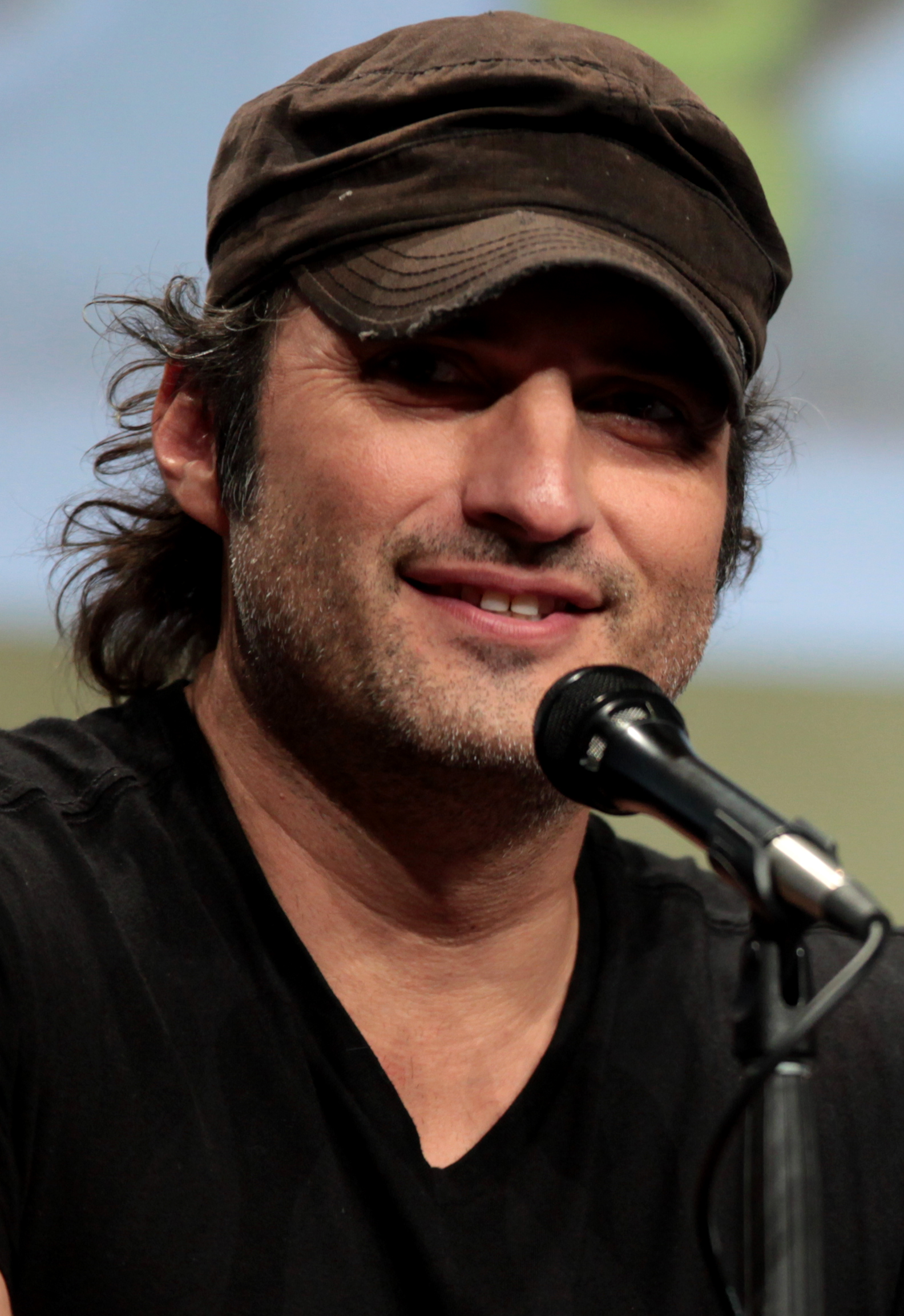
Robert Rodriguez (pictured) directed the music video for "Confident".

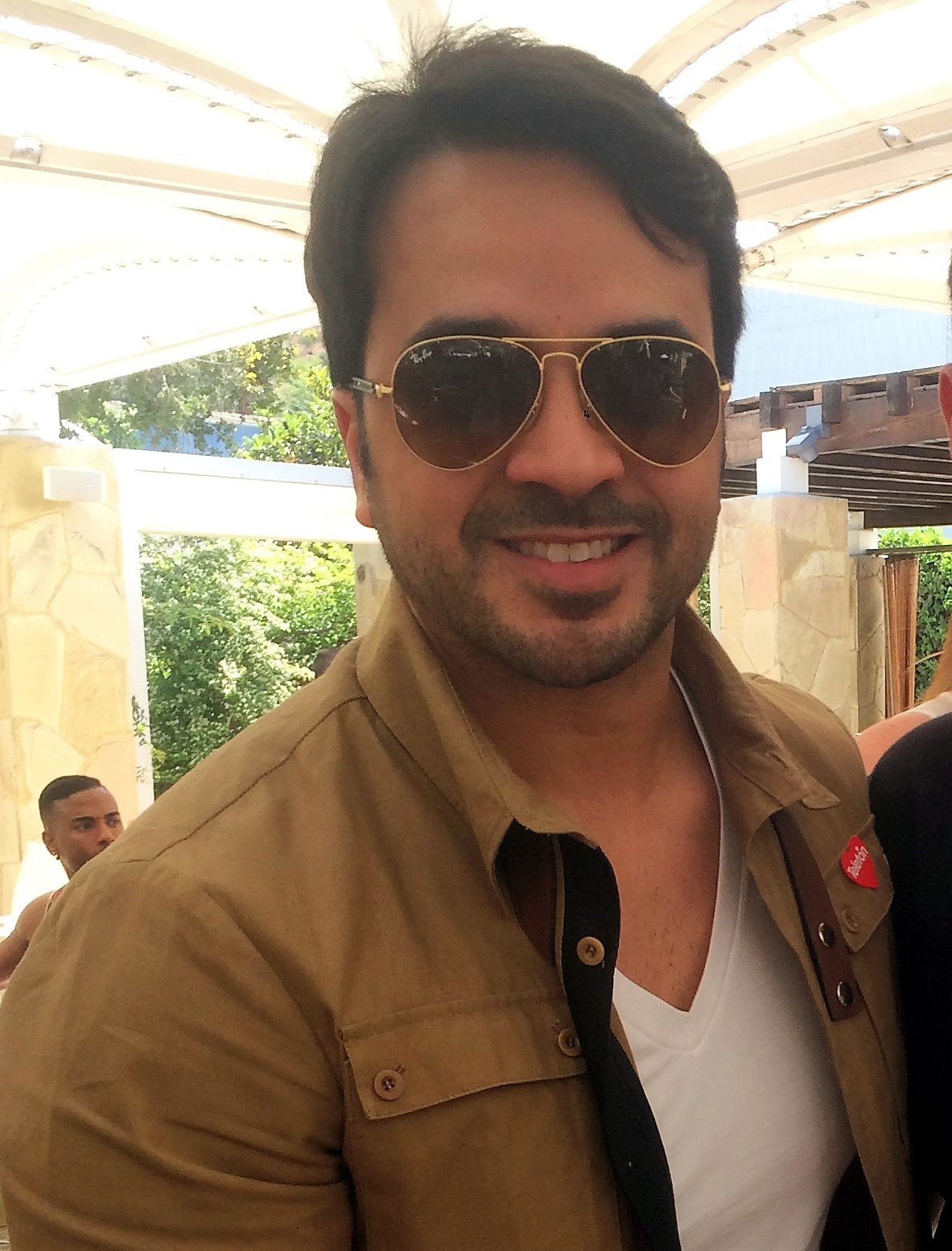
Lovato collaborated with Luis Fonsi (pictured) on "Échame la Culpa".

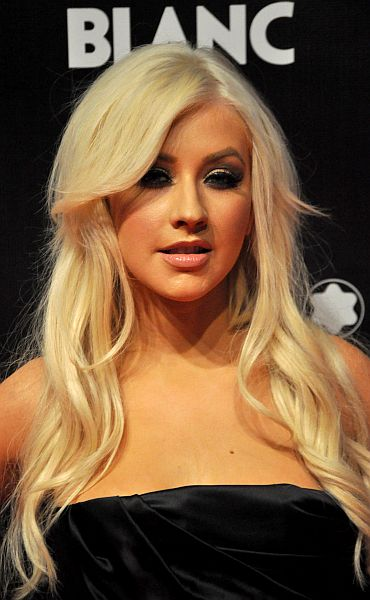
Lovato collaborated with Christina Aguilera (pictured) on "Fall in Line".

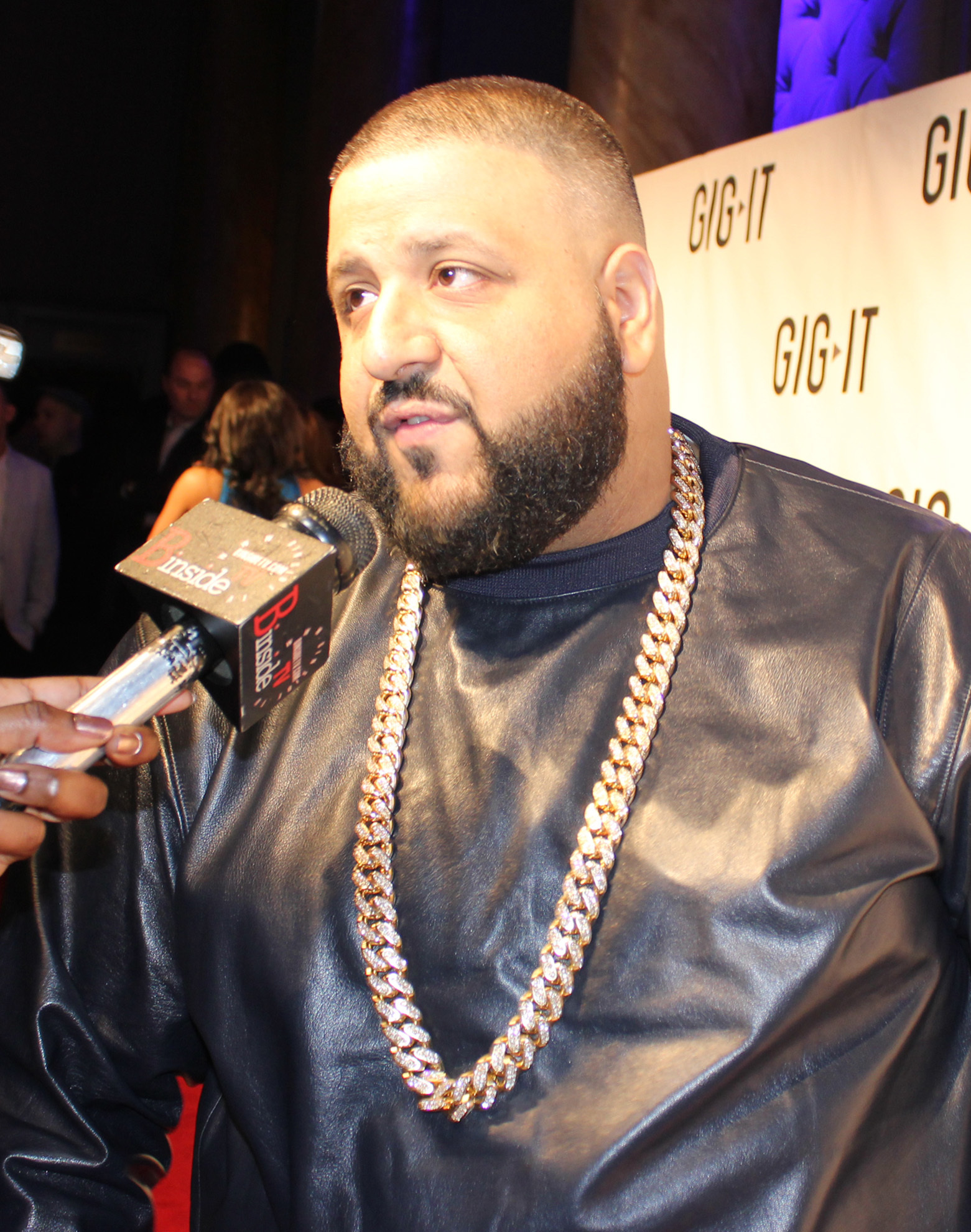
Lovato collaborated with DJ Khaled (pictured) on "I Believe" for the A Wrinkle in Time soundtrack.

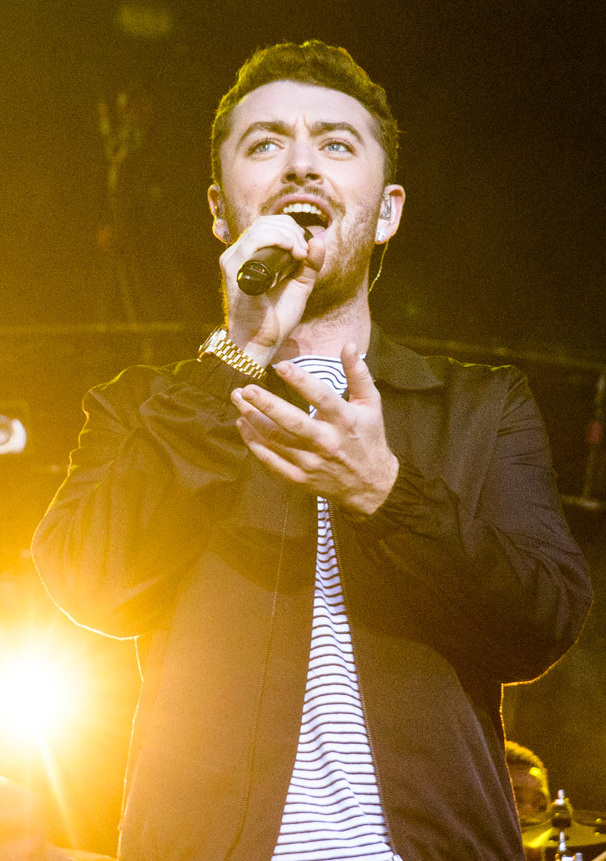
Lovato collaborated with Sam Smith (pictured) on "I'm Ready".

Title	Year	Other performer(s) credited	Director(s)	Description	Ref.
"Moves Me"	2004	None	Unknown	The video shows Lovato singing and dancing the song with her background dancer.	
"This Is Me"	2008	None	Unknown	The video features different scenes from the movie "Camp Rock" while Lovato and Joe Jonas sing the song as their characters, Mitchie and Shane respectively..	
"Get Back"	2008	None	Philip Andelman	The video shows Lovato and her band performing the song on top of a building near the Manhattan Bridge, with scenes cutting to just Lovato and her with her band.	
"La La Land"	2008	None	Tim Wheeler; Brendan Malloy	The video shows how Lovato handles the beginning stages of fame and success as her acting and singing career take off.	
"Lo que soy"	2009	None	Edgar Romero	The song is a Spanish version of "This Is Me"	
"Don't Forget"	2009	None	Robert Hales	The video shows Lovato singing alone in the back of a tour bus, eventually switching to scenes of her under an umbrella during a rainstorm in front of an empty, spinning carousal. The video cuts to Lovato singing with her band during a rainstorm.	
"One and the Same"	2009	Selena Gomez	Brandon Dickerson	The video shows Gomez and Lovato having fun on a stage. It is also composed of various clips from the film Princess Protection Program (2009).	
"Here We Go Again"	2009	None	Brendan Malloy	The video begins with Lovato in her dressing room to prepare for her concert. She speaks to her boyfriend (portrayed by Christopher Mason) over the phone before breaking up with him and heading to the stage to perform. Mason is shown visiting the concert and meeting Lovato in her dressing room with a rose, beginning their relationship again.	
"Send It On"	2009	Miley Cyrus; Selena Gomez; Jonas Brothers	F. Michael Blum	The music video has all four acts singing into microphones on top of a brightly lit stage and running across a park setting where many children are following them.	
"Gift of a Friend"	2009	None	Brandon Dickerson	The music video shows the singer walking through an enchanted forest, surrounded by magical lights and fantastic creatures, as she performs the song. The scenes are interspersed with clips from the movie Tinker Bell and the Lost Treasure, highlighting the importance of friendship.	
"Remember December"	2009	None	Tim Wheeler	The video includes three scenes in chronological order: Lovato performing with her band on stage; the second scene was Lovato with her friends portrayed by Meaghan Martin, Anna Maria Perez de Taglé and Chloe Bridges (stars of Lovato's Disney Channel television film Camp Rock 2: The Final Jam) taking her night out into the streets of Los Angeles; and the third with Lovato performing in front of bright lights.	
"Make a Wave"	2010	Joe Jonas	F. Michael Blum; Tracy Pion	The music video features Demi Lovato and Joe Jonas singing on a beach and near the ocean, highlighting the nature scenery. Intercut with their performance are scenes of marine life and people taking action to protect the environment, emphasizing the song's message about how small actions can create big changes.	
"We'll Be a Dream"	2010	We the Kings	Raul B. Fernandez	The video begins with various teenagers at a camp. Lovato walks through the teens as they throw pillows and toilet paper at each other. The video ends, as Lovato and Travis Clark, lead singer of We The Kings, look at each other.	
"It's On"	2010	Cast of Camp Rock 2: The Final Jam	Brandon Dickerson	The video cuts to various performers and the cast of Camp Rock 2: The Final Jam performing the song on circular stages and dancing to the choreography.	
"Skyscraper"	2011	None	Mark Pellington	The video begins with Lovato walking towards the camera on a desert road while wearing a long white dress, with the video progressively showing the emotions of Lovato as she sings about her past struggles and surviving difficult road bumps in her career.	
"Give Your Heart a Break"	2012	None	Justin Francis	The video begins with Lovato and her boyfriend (portrayed by Alex Bechet) having an argument over the phone. After hanging up, Lovato collects all the photos of them together from her apartment and pastes them on a wall across the street from her boyfriend's apartment. Lovato's boyfriend looks out the window as he sees a large collage of pictures, depicting a picture of them smiling.	
"Heart Attack"	2013	None	Chris Applebaum	The video shows Lovato singing in an empty building backed by her band, with multiple scenes cutting to her performing behind black and white backdrops, with black paint on her hands and arms as she sings into the camera.	
"Made in the USA" •	2013	None	Demi Lovato; Ryan Pallotta	The video shows Aimee Teegarden with her friends at a carnival where she sees Dustin Milligan for the first time, where they eventually start dating. Milligan leaves Teegarden behind to be deployed in the middle of a war. The climax of the story portrays a chaotic scene with Milligan in a battlefield. Simultaneously, Teegarden worries about Milligan, before he eventually returns home reuniting with Teegarden.	
"Let It Go"	2013	None	Declan Whitebloom	The video shows Lovato singing in an old abandoned mansion during the winter, playing the piano in some scenes, and wearing black and white ball gowns.	
"Neon Lights"	2013	None	Ryan Pallotta	The video begins with Lovato emerging from a pool of water. In the next scene, Lovato performed the introduction of the song in a room wired with neon lights and another scene where Lovato is shown dancing and singing with the backup dancers in a club.	
"Somebody to You"	2014	The Vamps	Emil Nava	The video shows a young girl (played by Laura Marano) with her friends in the summer until they are joined by The Vamps, and her group's lead singer (Bradley Simpson) falls in love with the girl.	
"Really Don't Care"	2014	Cher Lloyd	Ryan Pallotta	The video shows Lovato singing the song on a float during the 2014 Los Angeles Pride Parade, where she was named Grand Marshall.	
"Up"	2014	Olly Murs	Ben Turner; Gabe Turner	The video features Murs and Lovato standing in two rooms separated by a wall. They begin to wreck the rooms before Murs uses a guitar to break a hole into the wall and he and Lovato begin to remove most of the bricks in the wall.	
"Nightingale"	2014	None	Black Coffee	The video follows Lovato on tour, showing love for her fans – the Lovatics – who serve as her nightingales.	
"Cool for the Summer"	2015	None	Hannah Lux Davis	The video begins with Lovato driving around a city with her friends and eventually arriving at a party, cutting to a number of scenes showing people on trampolines and Lovato dancing and having fun at the party.	
"Confident"	2015	None	Robert Rodriguez	The video starts with Lovato in a maximum security prison where she is granted a pardon for selling out Michelle Rodriguez's character by a US marshal. Lovato is sent to apprehend Rodriguez, but Lovato soon realizes that Rodriguez is a step ahead of her. As the police attempt to take Lovato back to prison, she fights back and attempts to stop Rodriguez. Rodriguez overpowers her and they are taken captive by the police in a prison bus. However, they break free and jump into Rodriguez's trailing car before the pair realize they were both played (and branded) by the marshal. The two women team up and apprehend the marshal, and Lovato and Rodriguez bid farewell.	
"Waitin for You"	2015	Sirah	Black Coffee	The video shows Lovato revisiting her former middle school, Cross Timbers Middle School, in Grapevine, Texas, where she used to suffer from intense bullying experiences in the past. She struts around the schoolyard confidently while ready to fight. Sirah joins in later during her guest rap verse.	
"Irresistible"	2016	Fall Out Boy	Wayne Isham	The video stars Doug the Pug and references to Fall Out Boy's previous videos for her songs "Centuries", "Sugar, We're Goin Down", "Dance, Dance", "Uma Thurman" and the original video of "Irresistible".	
"Stone Cold"	2016	None	Patrick Ecclesine	The music video shows Lovato at various locations, such as snowy mountains and crying in a bathtub, singing in a depressive manner, ending with a shot of Lovato in the snow.	
"Without a Fight"	2016	Brad Paisley	Jeff Venable	The video features Paisley and Lovato singing with a full band, while simultaneously showing behind the scenes footage of her recording the song in the studio.	
"No Promises"	2017	Cheat Codes	Hannah Lux Davis	The futuristic video features Lovato and Cheat Codes performing the song while teleporting through time machines.	
"Sorry Not Sorry"	2017	None	Hannah Lux Davis	The video sees Lovato throwing a house party, frolicking by a pool, in an inflatable tub, on an outdoor dance floor, and in a beach chair, as her friends, including Paris Hilton, Jamie Foxx, Wiz Khalifa & Sirah thrash, laugh, and kiss around her.	
"Instruction"	2017	Jax Jones; Stefflon Don	Ozzie Pullin	The video shows Lovato, Stefflon Don and Jax Jones performing and dancing to the song with other backgrounds artists/dancers dancing and playing various instruments.	
"Échame la Culpa"	2017	Luis Fonsi	Carlos Pérez	The music video first takes place in Lovato's bedroom, before the duo meet up in an abandoned warehouse and hold a dance party.	
"Tell Me You Love Me"	2017	None	Mark Pellington	The music video shows Lovato and Jesse Williams celebrating their engagement, but portraying the jealousies that strain their relationship before they make it to the altar. After a few suspenseful moments, Williams' groom tells Lovato's bride that he is not ready and leaves her at the altar to the shock of their family and friends.	
"I Believe"	2018	DJ Khaled	Hannah Lux Davis	The video features Khaled and Lovato singing in various green-screen landscapes, including a golden wheat field, a dark forest and a natural backdrop surrounded by lush grass and blue skies, intercut with movie scenes.	
"Don't Go Breaking My Heart"	2018	Q-Tip	Unknown	The video does not include Lovato or Q-Tip, but shows a crowded room of dancers dressed in disco themed clothes dancing to the song in slow motion.	
"Fall in Line"	2018	Christina Aguilera	Luke Gilford	The video depicts Aguilera and Lovato being kidnapped and forced to sing in a futuristic prison filled with surveillance cameras; the two eventually fight their way to freedom.	
"Solo"	2018	Clean Bandit	Jack Patterson; Grace Chatto	The video follows Clean Bandit's Grace Chatto and a "lover", actor George Todd McLachlan, as they argue. Chatto ends up at a laundromat and pays an attendant (Ko Hyojoo) for an unknown concoction. The video then follows Hyojoo to retrieve this medicine which is being made for her by Jack and Luke Patterson. In the end, Chatto turns her abusive partner into a rainbow golden Labrador Retriever puppy. The video is briefly intercut with images of Chatto lying on a bed and a sun lounger with her face seemingly evaporating. Lovato makes brief appearances throughout the video.	
"Solo" (Japan Edition)	2018	Clean Bandit	Yutaka Ohara	This video was filmed in Kyoto and focuses on the dichotomy of trying to breakaway one's feelings and moving-on from the past with the inner-turmoil that comes along with it.	
"I Love Me"	2020	None	Hannah Lux Davis	The video is a return for Lovato after an almost two-year hiatus, as she confronts the demons of her past and victoriously overcomes obstacles that have come her way.	
"I'm Ready"	2020	Sam Smith	Jora Frantzis	The music video is set in an Olympic Games setting with Smith competing against a man on the wrestling mat. Smith lines up for a 100-meter sprint with drag queens and Lovato is seen on a tall diving board as an all-male synchronized swim team near her dive into the pool below her. Lovato and Smith eventually come together for a gymnast-filled medal ceremony.	
"Ok Not to Be Ok"	2020	Marshmello	Hannah Lux Davis	The video takes place in a suburban neighborhood where Lovato and Marshmello both wake up in bedrooms that belong to the younger versions of themselves. Lovato and her younger version both trash the bedroom, cutting between scenes of older Lovato singing in the center. Everyone eventually strolls around their neighborhood while singing and dancing to the song. The video ends with information about "Hope for the Day" and resources for suicide prevention.	
"Ok Not to Be Ok" (Duke & Jones Remix)	2020	Marshmello	Unknown	The video shows Marshmello and Lovato dancing around a studio designed with colorful art pieces.	
"Commander in Chief"	2020	None	Director X	The video features diverse Americans of different genders, races, sexual orientations, and ability groups lip-syncing the song before Lovato appears and performs the final moments of the song.	
"What Other People Say"	2021	Sam Fischer	Dano Cerny	The video features Lovato and Fischer singing inside of and on top of a train.	
"Dancing with the Devil" •	2021	None	Demi Lovato; Michael D. Ratner	The video recreates the details of the events involved in Lovato's 2018 drug overdoses, sexual assault, and near-death experience, as well as the aftermath in the hospital the days after.	
"Melon Cake"	2021	None	Hannah Lux Davis	The video sees Lovato presenting her younger self with a birthday cake, a luxury she did not have under her previous management. Alternating between three settings, Lovato is shown performing with a band on a green platform, standing on a grass field surrounded by dancers and wading through a neon-lit pool.	
"Breakdown"	2021	G-Eazy	Daniel CZ	In the video, Lovato and G-Eazy both reflect on their own fame and substance abuse. Lovato and G-Eazy are depicted having breakdowns while expressing their feelings and need for one another.	
"Skin of My Teeth"	2022	None	Nick Harwood	The music video shows Lovato struggling with inner demons, portrayed through dramatic and dark imagery like rain, a bathtub scene, and a mysterious figure in a trench coat. The visuals reflect the song's themes of addiction, recovery, and resilience, with a raw and edgy rock aesthetic.	
"Substance"	2022	None	Cody Critcheloe	The music video features Demi Lovato in a chaotic, rebellious setting, crashing through walls, attending a wild dinner, and causing mayhem in a corporate office. With its punk-rock vibe, the video reflects the song's critique of superficiality and the search for something beyond surface level. Paris Hilton makes a cameo.	
"Still Alive"	2023	None	Jensen Noen	The music video blends horror and action, featuring Demi Lovato and friends attending a private screening that turns deadly, with scenes inspired by the Scream VI movie. As Demi fights back against a masked killer, the video captures themes of survival, strength, and empowerment.	
"Swine"	2023	None	Meriel O'Connell	The music video presents an intense visual protest against the Supreme Court's decision to overturn *Roe v. Wade*. Set in a dark, industrial environment, Demi and a group of individuals confront male figures representing the Supreme Court, symbolizing a fight for reproductive rights and bodily autonomy. The video is charged with raw energy, featuring scenes of confrontation, resistance, and empowerment, all set to a punk-rock aesthetic that reinforces the message of standing up for rights.	
"Penhasco2"	2023	Luísa Sonza	Diego Fraga	The music video features Luísa Sonza in a forest, wounded and crying in front of a burning bed. The video conveys a sense of pain and emotional turmoil. At the end, Luísa stands up and walks towards a lake, where she submerges herself, symbolizing a moment of transformation or release. Although Demi Lovato collaborates on the track, she does not appear in the video.	
"Papa Was a Rolling Stone"	2024	Slash	Unknown	The music video showcases Slash and Demi Lovato performing in a gritty, emotional setting. Interspersed with studio shots and images of Detroit, the video reflects themes of abandonment and resilience, with Demi's powerful vocals complementing Slash's iconic guitar riffs.	
"Chula"	2024	Grupo Firme	Unknown	The music video showcases a dynamic live performance during the band's La Última Peda Tour 2024. Set against vibrant stage visuals, the video captures the fusion of electropop and regional Mexican rhythms, highlighting Demi's bilingual vocals and Grupo Firme's energetic presence.	
"Fast"	2025	None	Daniel Sachon		
"Here All Night"	2025	None	Hannah Lux Davis		
"Kiss"	2025	None	91 Rules (Erik Saltzman and Cameron Tidball-Sciullo)		

=== Guest appearances ===
Title	Year	Other performer(s) credited	Description	Ref.
"Something New" (featuring Ty Dolla Sign)	2017	Wiz Khalifa	Lovato is only featured in the beginning as she is welcomed by Wiz Khalifa before entering his house to join a pool party in the backyard.	
"Deadbeat" (featuring Skrillex)	2017	Sirah	The video features Lovato in her bedroom holding a shirtless guy on a dog leash, while the video proceeds to show family video footage from Sirah's life.	
"Never Alone" (Paul Oakenfold & Varun Remix)	2020	Emmanuel Kelly	The video shows Lovato and other celebrities sharing encouraging and inspirational 30-second cameos of raw, unfiltered and heartfelt words telling the camera what they do to gain strength when they feel alone.	
"Stuck with U"	2020	Ariana Grande; Justin Bieber	The video consists of clips sent in by young fans who would have attended prom in 2020 but are unable to do so due to the COVID-19 pandemic, as well as people and celebrities who are stuck inside spending time with loved ones.	
"Malibu" (At Home Edition)	2020	Kim Petras	The video features short clips of celebrities singing along to the song.	
"Do It Like Me"	2020	Bhad Bhabie	Clips of celebrities are shown singing the song's lyrics.	

== Video albums ==
Title	Album details
Be Like a Pop Star	Released: August 26, 2008; Label: Well Go USA; Formats: DVD, digital download
Live Walmart Soundcheck	Released: November 10, 2009; Label: Hollywood; Formats: DVD, digital download

== Filmography ==
=== Film ===
Year	Title	Role	Notes	Ref.
2003	Barney: Read with Me, Dance with Me	Angela	Direct-to-video	
2008	Camp Rock	Mitchie Torres	Television film	
2009	Jonas Brothers: The 3D Concert Experience	Herself	Concert film	
2009	Princess Protection Program	Rosie Gonzalez / Rosalinda María Montoya Fiore	Television film	
2010	Camp Rock 2: The Final Jam	Mitchie Torres	Television film	
2012	Demi Lovato: Stay Strong	Herself	Documentary	
2017	Smurfs: The Lost Village	Smurfette	Voice role	
2017	Louder Together	Herself	Documentary	
2017	Demi Lovato: Simply Complicated	Herself	Documentary	
2018	Charming	Lenore Quinonez/Lenny	Voice role	
2020	Eurovision Song Contest: The Story of Fire Saga	Katiana Lindsdóttir	Netflix film	
2024	Child Star	Herself	Documentary	
2025	Tow	Nova		
2026	Camp Rock 3	Mitchie Torres	Television film; cameo appearance	

Key
†	Denotes films that have not yet been released

=== Television ===
Year	Title	Role	Notes	Ref.
2002–2004	Barney & Friends	Angela	Recurring role (season 7–8)	
2006	Prison Break	Danielle Curtin	Episode: "First Down"	
2007–2008	As the Bell Rings	Charlotte Adams	Lead role (season 1)	
2007	Just Jordan	Nicole	Episode: "Slippery When Wet"	
2008	Studio DC: Almost Live	Herself	Episode: "The Second Show"	
2009–2011	Sonny with a Chance	Sonny Munroe	Lead role	
2009	My Camp Rock	Herself / Musical Guest	Episode: "The Results Show"	
2010	Grey's Anatomy	Hayley May	Episode: "Shiny Happy People"	
2010	America's Next Top Model	Herself	Episode: "Diane von Furstenberg"	
2010–2011	Extreme Makeover: Home Edition	Herself	Episodes: "The Williams Family" and "The McPhail Family"	
2012	This Is How I Made It	Herself	Episode: "Demi Lovato and B.o.B"	
2012	The Eric Andre New Year's Eve Spooktacular	Herself	Television special	
2012–2013	The X Factor	Judge / Mentor	Season 2–3	
2013–2014	Glee	Dani	Recurring role (season 5); 4 episodes	
2015	Saturday Night Live	Herself / Musical Guest	Episode: "Tracy Morgan/Demi Lovato"	
2015	We Day	Host	Television special (10th edition)	
2015	RuPaul's Drag Race	Herself / Guest judge	Episode: "Divine Inspiration"	
2015	From Dusk till Dawn: The Series	Maia	Guest role; 2 episodes	
2017	The Voice	Herself / Musical Guest	Episode: "Live Finale Results"	
2017	Project Runway	Herself	Season 16 Episode "We're sleeping wear?"	
2018	Dr. Phil	Herself	Episode: "Demi Lovato: Up Close and Personal"	
2020	Will & Grace	Jenny	Recurring role (season 11)	
2020	The Ellen DeGeneres Show	Herself / Guest Host	March 6, 2020; standing in for Ellen DeGeneres	
2020	iHeart Living Room Concert for America	Herself	Concert special	
2020	The Disney Family Singalong	Herself	Television special	
2020	Game On!	Herself	Episode: "Celebrity Guests: Demi Lovato & Ronda Rousey"	
2020	46th People's Choice Awards	Herself / Host	Award show	
2021	Celebrating America	Herself / Performer	Television special for the Inauguration of President Joe Biden	
2021	Legendary	Herself / Guest judge	Episode: "Ice Haus"	
2021	The Demi Lovato Show	Herself	Host	
2021	Cooking with Paris	Herself	Episode: "Italian Night"	
2021	Unidentified with Demi Lovato	Herself	Host	
2022	Moving the Needle with Dr. Woo	Herself	Episode: "Demi Lovato"	
2023	Dave	Herself	Cameo	
2023	The Masked Singer	Anonymouse	Season 10, Episode 1	
2023	A Very Demi Holiday Special	Herself	Television special	
2023	Dynamo is Dead	Herself / Guest	Television special	

=== Web ===
Year	Title	Role	Notes	Ref.
2009	KSM: Read Between the Lines	Herself	3 episodes	
2020	Dear Class of 2020	Herself	Special	
2020	Pepsi: Unmute Your Voice	Herself	Triller Special	
2020	Hello 2021	Herself	YouTube Originals Special	
2021	Demi Lovato: Dancing with the Devil	Herself	YouTube docuseries	

=== Director ===
Year	Title	Role	Ref.
2024	Child Star	Co-director	

=== Producer ===
Year	Title	Role	Ref.
2017	Demi Lovato: Simply Complicated	Executive producer	
2017	Beyond Silence	Executive producer	
2018	Charming	Executive music producer	
2021	Demi Lovato: Dancing with the Devil	Executive producer	
2023	A Very Demi Holiday Special	Executive producer	
2024	Child Star	Producer	
2025	Tow	Executive producer	
2026	Camp Rock 3	Executive producer	
