= List of Billboard number-one dance albums of 2025 =

These are the albums that reached number one on the Billboard Top Dance Albums chart in 2025.

== Chart history ==
Key
†	Indicates best-performing album of 2025

List of number-one albums
Issue date	Album	Artist	Reference
January 4	Brat †	Charli XCX	
January 11	Brat †	Charli XCX	
January 18	Brat †	Charli XCX	
January 25	Brat †	Charli XCX	
February 1	Brat †	Charli XCX	
February 8	Eusexua	FKA Twigs	
February 15	Brat †	Charli XCX	
February 22	Brat †	Charli XCX	
March 1	Brat †	Charli XCX	
March 8	Brat †	Charli XCX	
March 15	Brat †	Charli XCX	
March 22	Mayhem	Lady Gaga	
March 29	Mayhem	Lady Gaga	
April 5	Mayhem	Lady Gaga	
April 12	Mayhem	Lady Gaga	
April 19	Mayhem	Lady Gaga	
April 26	Mayhem	Lady Gaga	
May 3	Mayhem	Lady Gaga	
May 10	Mayhem	Lady Gaga	
May 17	Mayhem	Lady Gaga	
May 24	Mayhem	Lady Gaga	
May 31	Mayhem	Lady Gaga	
June 7	Mayhem	Lady Gaga	
June 14	Mayhem	Lady Gaga	
June 21	Mayhem	Lady Gaga	
June 28	Mayhem	Lady Gaga	
July 5	Mayhem	Lady Gaga	
July 12	Mayhem	Lady Gaga	
July 19	Period	Kesha	
July 26	Mayhem	Lady Gaga	
August 2	Mayhem	Lady Gaga	
August 9	Mayhem	Lady Gaga	
August 16	Mayhem	Lady Gaga	
August 23	Mayhem	Lady Gaga	
August 30	Mayhem	Lady Gaga	
September 6	Mayhem	Lady Gaga	
September 13	Mayhem	Lady Gaga	
September 20	Mayhem	Lady Gaga	
September 27	Mayhem	Lady Gaga	
October 4	Tron: Ares (soundtrack)	Nine Inch Nails	
October 11	Mayhem	Lady Gaga	
October 18	Brat †	Charli XCX	
October 25	Mayhem	Lady Gaga	
November 1	Deadbeat	Tame Impala	
November 8	It's Not That Deep	Demi Lovato	
November 15	Deadbeat	Tame Impala	
November 22	Mayhem	Lady Gaga	
November 29	Deadbeat	Tame Impala	
December 6	Mayhem	Lady Gaga	
December 13	Mayhem	Lady Gaga	
December 20	Mayhem	Lady Gaga	
December 27	Mayhem	Lady Gaga	
