= Frequency (Demi Lovato song) =

Promotional single by Demi Lovato

from the album It's Not That Deep
- B-side: "Frequency" (VTSS remix)
- Released: October 24, 2025
- Studio: Westlake, Los Angeles
- Genre: EDM
- Length: 2:43
- Label: Island
- Songwriters: Demi Lovato; Sarah Hudson; Jake Torrey; Kevin Hickey
- Producer: Zhone

Lyric video
- "Frequency" on YouTube

"Frequency" is a song recorded by the American singer Demi Lovato, released as the third track on her (Note: Lovato uses both she/her and they/them pronouns. This article uses she/her for consistency.) ninth studio album, It's Not That Deep, on October 24, 2025. The EDM song was written by Lovato, Sarah Hudson, Jake Torrey, and Zhone, the latter of whom also produced the song. The song was created after Lovato experimented with rock and R&B music following the release of the rock-oriented albums Holy Fvck (2022) and Revamped (2023), ultimately settling on dance music after finding that neither genre resonated with her.

The song was released as a promotional single by Island Records in conjunction with Record Store Day on 7-inch vinyl, with a remix by VTSS appearing on the B-side. Following its release, the song charted on the United Kingdom's physical singles, singles sales, and vinyl singles charts. "Frequency" was also performed by Lovato during promotional appearances for It's Not That Deep and was included on the set list of her It's Not That Deep Tour.

== Background ==
Four months after the release of her eighth studio album, Holy Fvck (2022), Demi Lovato was reportedly working on new music. A remix album, Revamped, was released on September 15, 2023, featuring reimagined versions of songs from her previous albums and continuing the rock-oriented sound of its predecessor. On July 21, 2025, Rolling Stone reported that Lovato was finishing a "celebratory dance-pop album", with Zhone serving as executive producer.

Following the release of the singles "Fast" and "Here All Night", she unveiled the title and cover of her ninth studio album, It's Not That Deep on September 15. "Frequency" was unveiled as the third song in the track listing for It's Not That Deep on October 10 via an Instagram photo carousel, which featured the German singer Kim Petras holding up a phone displaying the text "play Frequency."

== Release and promotion ==
Demi Lovato's ninth studio album, It's Not That Deep, was released on October 24, 2025, via Island Records, Republic Records and DLG Recordings, LLC, with "Frequency" as its third track. On April 18, 2026, the song was released by Island Records as a limited edition 7-inch single in conjunction with Record Store Day. The release was limited to 4,000 copies, and featured a remix by VTSS on its B-side. Following its vinyl release, the track went on to chart on the United Kingdom single sales, physical singles and vinyl singles charts.

=== Live performances ===
Lovato debuted the song at a New York Fashion Week after-party hosted by Paper on September 15, 2025, prior to its release. Following the release of It's Not That Deep, the track was part of the set list for Lovato's One Night Only at the Palladium concert, which took place on October 25 at the Hollywood Palladium. Lovato performed the song alongside "Confident" on the finale of the twenty-first season of Germany's Next Topmodel, which aired on May 28, 2026. The track was also included on the set list for Lovato's eighth concert tour, the It's Not That Deep Tour.

== Composition and development ==
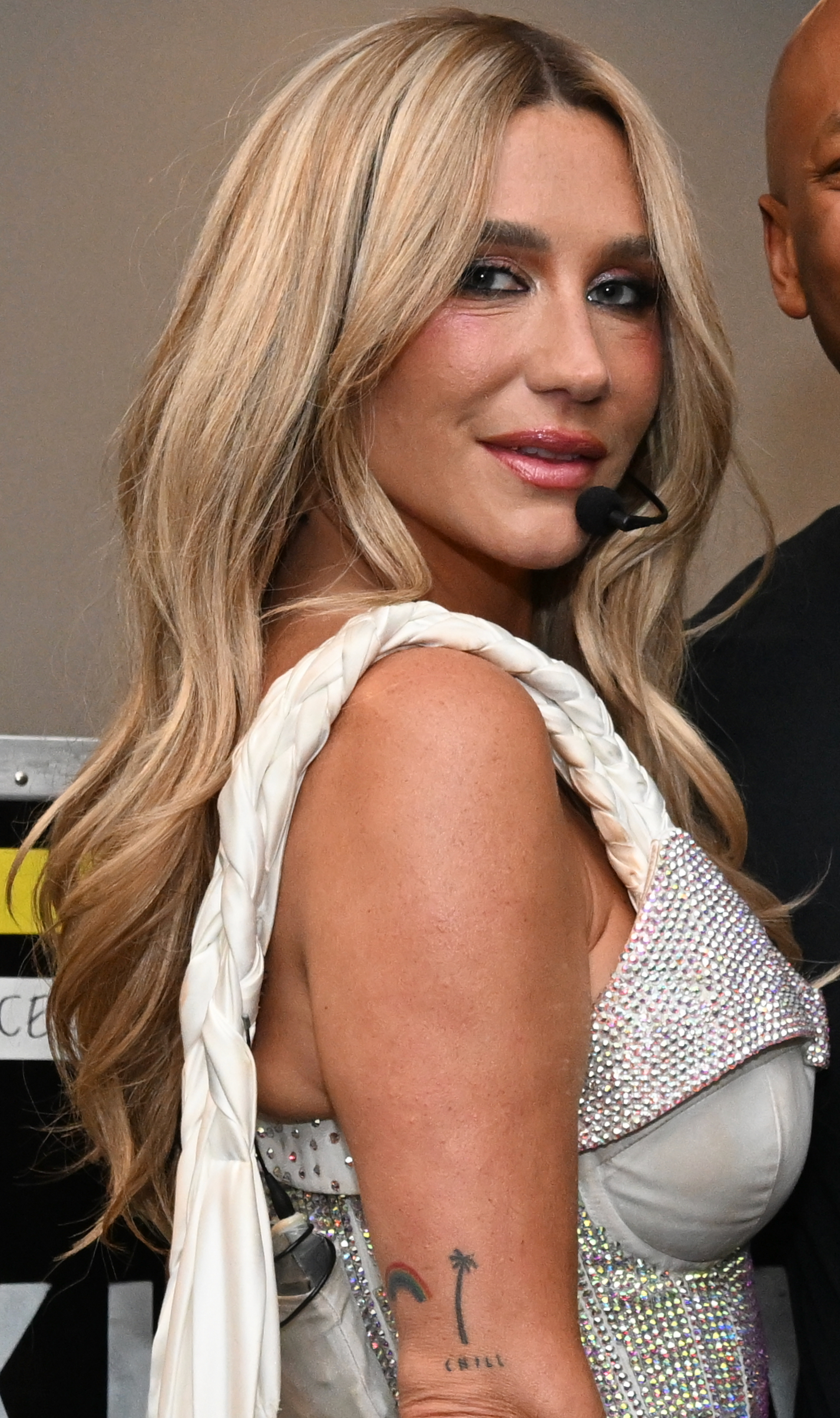
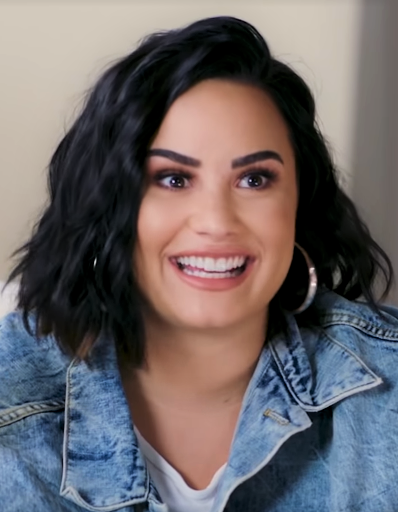
Singer Kesha (left) introduced Zhone to Lovato (right), who produced "Frequency" and her 2025 album It's Not That Deep.

"Frequency" was written by Demi Lovato, Sarah Hudson, Jake Torrey and producer Zhone, who recorded the song with Lovato in Westlake Studios, Los Angeles. The EDM song is two minutes and fifty-three seconds long, and features bass and synth sounds while Lovato rap-sings.

In an interview with Vogue, Lovato explained that she initially intended to make another rock album following Holy Fvck (2022), but eventually abandoned the idea, saying that she was in a "good place" and that there were "so many happy rock songs that you can write". She then experimented with R&B and pop, but Lovato expressed that she did not resonate with the sound. Singer Kesha introduced Lovato to Zhone, who subsequently presented her with the beat for "Frequency", which Lovato described as "so new" and "so different" for her, as well as "really fucking fun".

== Critical reception ==
Writing for The Line of Best Fit, David Cobbald named "Frequency" a standout track from It's Not That Deep, praising its "heavy" beat and sung-rapped vocals. The song received several comparisons to 2010s songs: India Block of The Standard compared it to Britney Spears' "Work Bitch" (2013), while Slant's Sal Cinquemani compared it to early 2010s pop radio songs, including Rihanna's "Where Have You Been" (2012) and Kesha's "Blow" (2011). Matthew Dwyer of PopMatters commented that the track resembled Lovato's early hits, described as "radio pop that showcased her vocal range", calling the song's post-chorus an "autotuned EDM haze". Clash's Kate Jeffrie called the song "gorgeously indebted" to Madonna's "Erotica" (1992), describing it as "primal, raw, no-holds-barred".

== Credits and personnel ==
The credits are adapted from Apple Music.

=== Musicians ===
- Demi Lovato – songwriter, vocals
- Sarah Hudson – songwriter
- Jake Torrey – songwriter
- Zhone – songwriter, producer, programmer, percussion, keyboards

=== Technical ===
- Zhone – recording engineer
- Jeremie Inhaber – mixing engineer
- Nathan Dantzler – mastering engineer
- Harrison Tate – assistant mastering engineer
- Joe Grasso – immersive mixing engineer
- Augusto Sanchez – immersive mixing engineer

== Charts ==
Chart performance
Chart (2026)	Peak position
UK Singles Sales (Official Charts)	64
UK Physical Singles (Official Charts)	37
UK Vinyl Singles (Official Charts)	29

== Release history ==
Release dates and formats
Region	Date	Format	Version	Label	Ref.
Various	April 18, 2026	7-inch vinyl	Original; VTSS remix	Island	
