= Live: Walmart Soundcheck =

Live: Walmart Soundcheck may refer to:

- Live: Walmart Soundcheck (Demi Lovato album)
- Live: Walmart Soundcheck (Jonas Brothers album)
