= Poot =

Poot may refer to:

== People ==
- Eduardo Avelino Magaña Poot (born 1984), Mexican archer
- Marcel Poot (1901–88), Belgian classical music composer
- Pootie Poot, George W. Bush's nickname for Vladimir Putin
- Poot family, Belgian family
- Poot Lovato, fictional sister of singer Demi Lovato

== Arts, entertainment, and media ==
- Poot, a pet in My Teacher is an Alien
- Poot, a fictional pygmy hippo from the animated film Night of the Zoopocalypse
- Poot Carr, a fictional character on the HBO drama The Wire
- Poot! (comics), a British adult comic

== Other uses ==
- Poot, slang for flatulence
- Poot, to aspirate, from the entomological term pooter (aspirator)

== See also ==
- Poots
