= The Bigg Chill =

Frozen yogurt restaurant in Los Angeles

- Interactive map of The Bigg Chill

Restaurant information
- Established: 1986
- Owners: Cary Russell and Diane Dinow
- Location: 10850 West Olympic Blvd, Los Angeles, Los Angeles, California, 90064, United States
- Coordinates: 34°02′37.4″N 118°25′53.0″W
- Website: thebiggchill.com

The Bigg Chill is a frozen yogurt shop in Westwood, Los Angeles. It was established in 1986, and bought in 1990 by current owners Diane Dinow and her daughter, Cary Russell. The store has been noted for its interior design, variety of conventional flavors, and longevity.

== Store ==
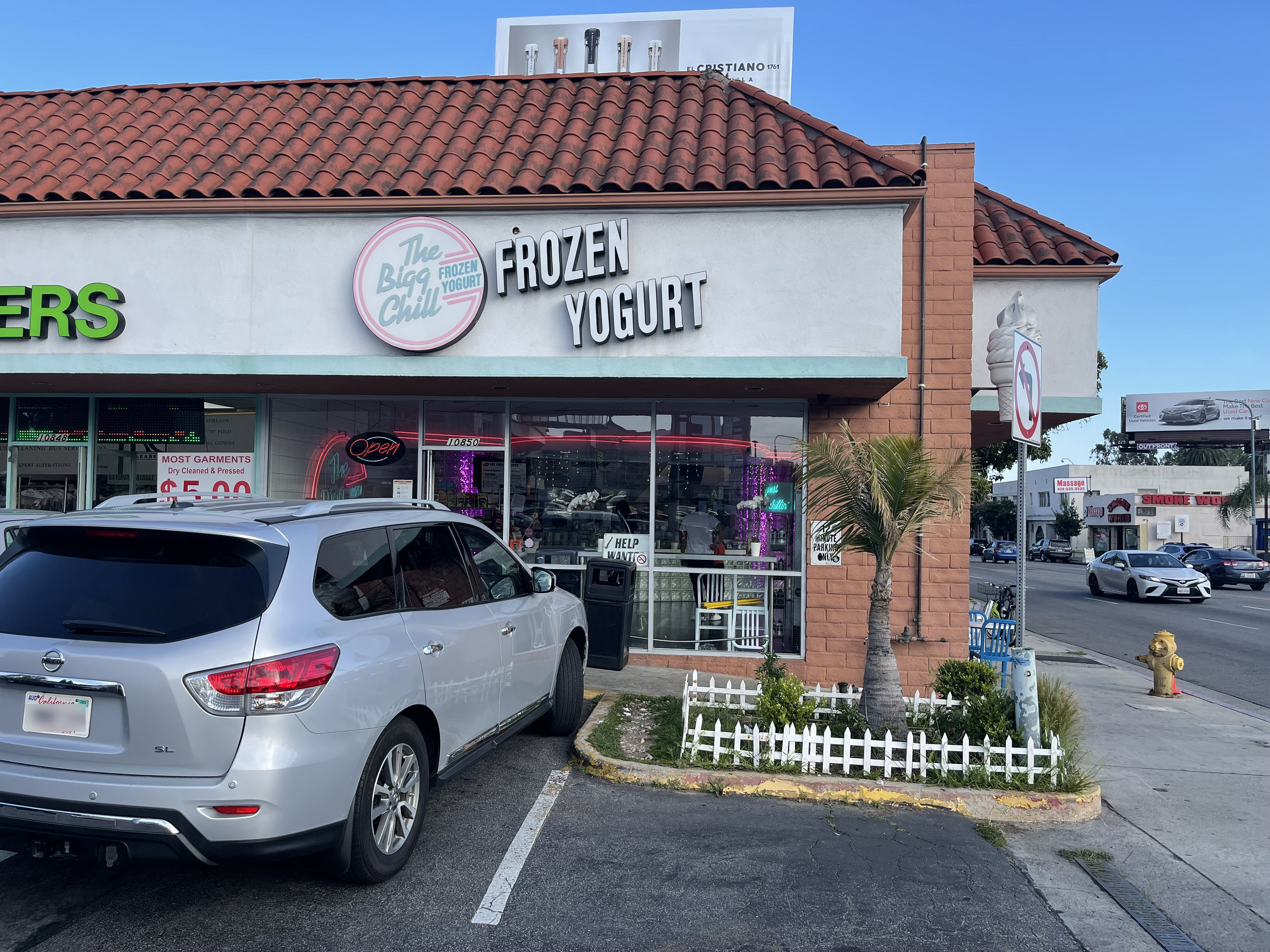
Exterior of the store as of April 2022

The Bigg Chill's interior has a neon-pink and aqua theme. The store rotates daily from a selection of over 400 flavors and only accepts cash. Many of the store's early flavors were created by Michael Mendelsohn; in 1994, he told the Los Angeles Times that chocolate, vanilla, and peanut butter were the best-selling flavors, and the toasted almond and Mounds candy bar flavors also performed well.

The store's owners reported in 2011 that they could see as many as 1,000 customers a day, and up to 1,300 on the weekends.

== History ==
=== Early history ===
The Bigg Chill was established in 1986 in a small strip mall in Westwood, Los Angeles. In 1990, the store was bought by Cary Russell and her mother, Diane Dinow. The Los Angeles Times characterized the name as a homage to the 1983 film The Big Chill. On January 26, 1990, a fire broke out at a neighboring cleaners store in the strip mall, causing "extensive" damage. In 1994, the Los Angeles Times wrote that The Bigg Chill saw hundreds of regular customers daily. Up to 150 people could call in a day to hear which flavors the store was offering, causing the owners to begin listing the daily rotation of flavors on their answering machine. Dinow had already received several offers to franchise the store, but she refused; she had plans to open another store in Studio City, securing a US$100,000 loan (US$217,220 in today's money) to open it.

In 2006, frozen yogurt chain Pinkberry rose to popularity, causing The Bigg Chill's revenues to drop 30 percent. Russell created and heavily marketed a tart ice cream flavor known as "Chill Berry" to recuperate profits.

=== Demi Lovato incident ===
In April 2021, The Bigg Chill received widespread attention on social media after singer-songwriter and actor Demi Lovato criticized the store on her Instagram story. Lovato argued that it had too many diet foods prominently displayed, which she characterized as "perpetuating a society that not only enables but praises disordered eating", including the hashtag "#dietculturevultures". The Bigg Chill responded that it carries those products for people with celiac disease, diabetes, and vegans. They also directly messaged Lovato on Instagram, "We are not diet vultures. We cater to all of our customers needs for the past 36 years. We are sorry you found this offensive". The back-and-forth continued, with Lovato receiving significant backlash on social media and in the news. Some users accused Lovato of using her large platform—Lovato had 102 million Instagram followers—to unfairly criticize a small business. The Bigg Chill told The Huffington Post that they were "really hurt by Demi's comments" and reiterated their support for their variety of options.

Lovato apologized a few days later, describing her experience in the store and how it triggered her, and said, "I just get really passionate. Y'all know me. I'm pretty feisty, and sometimes my emotions get the best of me". Afterwards, The Bigg Chill denied rumors that Lovato had donated $100,000 to the store and said they did not want Lovato to do so. The store's following on Instagram increased from 6,000 to 42,000 followers during the controversy. Russell commented that people were "shocked by how she came at us. And so were we. It was like, wait, why is she attacking us? What did we do?" In July 2025, Lovato revisited the frozen yogurt shop ahead of the release for her single "Fast", as a conciliatory gesture.

== Reception and impact ==
In a 2011 profile from The New York Times, Nicole LaPorte praised the store's endurance, despite emerging trends of designer frozen yogurt flavors and self-serve yogurt. While LaPorte characterized the ice cream as ordinary, she also argued that the store's resistance to change provides it authenticity and a loyal customer base, a strategy she characterized as more effective than the "unique and pleasing sensory environment" of Pinkberry. Customers compared The Bigg Chill to an "old-time ice-cream parlor".

In a 2016 "Discourse On Frozen Yogurt" from Los Angeles magazine, Marielle Wakim categorized The Bigg Chill as an "OG Veteran" for its long time quality and reputation among Los Angeles's frozen yogurt stores. Wakim noted the store's neon turquoise and pink motif, service, and simple non-designer flavors such as "Vanilla Custard" and "Fresh Strawberry" rather than "Taro" or "Green Tea". KCET also noted the store's resistance to exotic flavors, commenting that they did not "sell out to yogurt trends" when a rival store was opened nearby. They also complimented the store's yogurt pies and called the store a "UCLA institution" despite its location in West Los Angeles. While reviewing Los Angeles frozen yogurt stores, CBS Los Angeles complimented the store's "cool retro look" and large selection of flavors.

Amy Salko Robertson told the Jewish Journal in 2013 that when she started a frozen yogurt shop in Santa Monica, she drew inspiration from The Bigg Chill to experiment with flavors.

Los Angeles magazine reported that between March and June 2020—the beginning of the COVID-19 pandemic lockdowns—The Bigg Chill was the fifth most popular Los Angeles restaurant on food-delivery service Postmates.
