= Poots =

Poots is a surname. Notable people with this name include:

- Alex Poots (born 1967), British artistic director in New York City
- Charles Poots (1929-2020), politician from Northern Ireland
- Edwin Poots (born 1965), politician from Northern Ireland
- Imogen Poots (born 1989), British actress
- Tysson Poots (born 1988), American football player

== See also ==
- Poot (disambiguation)
