= Low Rise Jeans =

2026 single by Demi Lovato

Single by Demi Lovato

from the album It's Not That Deep (Unless You Want It to Be)
- Released: April 17, 2026
- Genre: Dance-pop; pop
- Length: 3:26
- Label: DLG; Island
- Songwriters: Brett McLaughlin; Demi Lovato; Jake Torrey; Sarah Hudson; Uzoechi Emenike; Zhone
- Producer: Zhone

Demi Lovato singles chronology
"Kiss" (2025)	"Low Rise Jeans" (2026)

Lyric video
- "Low Rise Jeans" on YouTube

"Low Rise Jeans" is a song by the American singer Demi Lovato. It was released through Island Records and her own imprint label, DLG Recordings, on April 17, 2026, as the first single from the deluxe edition and fourth overall single of Lovato's ninth studio album, It's Not That Deep (2025).

== Background and release ==
Following the 2025 release of her ninth studio album, It's Not That Deep, Lovato embarked on its accompanying tour, It's Not That Deep Tour. In 2026, she announced a deluxe edition of It's Not That Deep, titled It's Not That Deep (Unless You Want It to Be). It features eight additional songs, including its first single "Low Rise Jeans".

== Composition ==
Co-written and produced by Zhone, "Low Rise Jeans" is a dance-pop and pop song. It features elements of hip-hop and adopts a retro style, running for three minutes and twenty-six seconds. According to Rolling Stone, Lovato "celebrat[es] how much her low-rise jeans are turning someone on".

== Charts ==
Chart performance for "Low Rise Jeans"
Chart (2026)	Peak position
Lithuania Airplay (TopHit)	90
New Zealand Hot Singles (RMNZ)	19
Nicaragua Anglo Airplay (Monitor Latino)	3

== Release history ==
List of release dates and formats
Region	Date	Format(s)	Label	Ref.
Various	April 17, 2026	Digital download; streaming	Island	
