= Unforgettable (Tommy's Song) =

Promotional single by Demi Lovato
- Written: October 2019 (Note: Lovato stated that she wrote the song the day after learning of Thomas Trussell III's death. Trussell died on October 8, 2019, while Lovato publicly acknowledged Trussell's death on October 9, 2019.)
- Released: October 9, 2021
- Length: 3:53
- Label: Island
- Songwriters: Demi Lovato; Warren Okay Felder; Andrew Wansel; Sarah Aarons
- Producer: Pop & Oak

Lyric video
- "Unforgettable (Tommy's Song)" on YouTube

"Unforgettable (Tommy's Song)" is a song recorded by the American singer Demi Lovato, which was released on October 9, 2021 by Island Records. The song was written by Lovato, alongside Sarah Aarons, Warren "Oak" Felder and Andrew "Pop" Wansel, with Felder and Wansel also serving as producers. The song is dedicated to model Thomas Trussell III, who was Lovato's friend and died on October 2019 following a battle with drug addiction.

Lovato wrote "Unforgettable (Tommy's Song)" a day after learning of Trussell's death, and the song was released on the second anniversary of his death. Its release was used to promote the Substance Abuse and Mental Health Services Administration's helpline, with all net proceeds going to the Voices Project, a nonprofit advocacy organization focused on addiction awareness in the United States.

== Background ==
On June 21, 2018, Demi Lovato released the song "Sober", in which she (Note: Lovato uses both she/her and they/them pronouns. This article uses she/her for consistency.) revealed she had relapsed after six years of sobriety. Nearly a month later, Lovato was hospitalized at Cedars-Sinai Medical Center in Los Angeles following an overdose. Model Thomas Trussell III, who was Lovato's friend, died on October 8, 2019 following a battle with drug addiction. Following Trussell's death, Lovato wrote on Instagram Stories:

Devastated. Please hold your loved ones tight. Tell them they are special and that you love them. Make sure they know it. Addiction is NO joke [...] Heaven gained this beautiful angel last night because of that terrible disease. I’m crushed and will always miss you [...] If you or someone you know is struggling please know it’s okay to ask for help.

— Demi Lovato

Lovato wrote "Unforgettable (Tommy's Song)" the day after finding out about Trussell's death. As a tribute to Trussell, Lovato had a tattoo made of a cursive T on her forearm from tattoo artist Rafael Valdez, which she shared via Instagram Stories. Two months after the release of the song and a day after honoring Trussell's birthday, Lovato announced that she was no longer following a "California sober" lifestyle, (Note: The term "California sober", which has no fixed definition, refers to the practice of consuming marijuana, and in some cases moderate amounts of alcohol, while abstaining from other substances.) stating that "sober sober is the only way to be."

== Release and promotion ==
"Unforgettable (Tommy's Song)" was released on October 9, 2021 on digital music stores and music streaming platforms by Island Records, two years after the death of Thomas Trussell III. Shortly after the song's release, Demi Lovato shared a post on social media, in which she wrote:

Two years ago I lost someone who meant so much to me. His name was Tommy and he was such a beautiful, special man [...] I wrote this song the day after I found out that he had lost his battle with addiction. This disease is extremely cunning and powerful..

— Demi Lovato

She added that the song's net proceeds will benefit the Voices Project, a nonprofit advocacy organization focused on addiction awareness in the United States. Lovato also used the track's release to promote and encourage people with addiction to contact the Substance Abuse and Mental Health Services Administration's national helpline.

== Composition and lyrics ==
"Unforgettable (Tommy's Song)" was written by Demi Lovato, Warren "Oak" Felder, Andrew "Pop" Wansel and Sarah Aarons. Felder and Wansel are credited with keyboards and, collectively as Pop & Oak, with the song's production; Felder also served as vocal producer. The song was engineered by Chris Gehringer (mastering), Felder (recording) and Neal H Pogue (mixing). It is three minutes and fifty-three seconds long.

The lyrics of the track's first verse recount Lovato's friendship with Thomas Trussell III, while expressing admiration for his eyes and acknowledging his absence after his death. Its pre-chorus highlights Demi's own struggles with addiction alongside Trusell's, while sharing optimistic wishes following his death. The song's second verse recounts Lovato's last encounter with Trussell, and the toll Trussell's death took on her. Before closing the song, the bridge shows Lovato expressing regret over the time they did not have together.

== Reception ==
Writing for Billboard, Stephen Daw described "Unforgettable (Tommy's Song)" as a "stunning" and "grooving tribute" to Thomas Trussell III. Daw highlighted Lovato's memories of Trussell and the emotional aftermath of his death, particularly the song's chorus, in which Lovato sings, "You begged me not to forget you / But how could I? / You're unforgettable." NME's Debbie Carr referred to the song as an "emotional" and "heartfelt" track. In a review for Stereogum, Chris DeVille praised the song's "loose, loping 40-esque soul groove" and Lovato's vocals, writing that the combination "equals a good song", adding interest for an album similar to the song's style. Glenn Garner of People reported the song received an "outpouring of support" from fans and mutual friends of Thomas Trussell III. The phrase "Tommy is unforgettable" became a worldwide trending topic on Twitter, which Lovato acknowledged by thanking fans and writing, "This would mean the world to him".

== Credits and personnel ==
The credits were adapted from Tidal and Apple Music.

=== Musicians ===
- Demi Lovato – performer, composer, lyricist
- Oak Felder – producer, composer, lyricist, associated performer, keyboard, vocal producer
- Sarah Aarons – composer, lyricist
- Andrew Wansel – producer, composer, lyricist, keyboard, associated performer

=== Technical ===
- Chris Gehringer – mastering engineer, studio personnel
- Oak Felder – programmer, recording engineer, studio personnel
- Neal H Pogue – mixing engineer, studio personnel
- Andrew Wansel – programmer
