= Poot Lovato =

Fictional sister of Demi Lovato

- Edited photograph that became the Poot Lovato meme. Lovato's head was edited to appear wider.
- First appearance: Tumblr
- Created by: Cstcrpt

In-universe information
- Gender: Female
- Family: Demi Lovato (sister)

Poot Lovato, or simply Poot, is a fictional twin sister of American singer Demi Lovato. Originating on Tumblr in 2015, the character has become a popular internet meme and been referenced by Lovato herself on several occasions.

== Origin ==
The photograph that became the inspiration for the Poot character was taken in 2014, during Demi Lovato's Royal Variety Performance at the Palladium Theatre. This photo was later edited to make their (Note: Demi goes by both they/them and she/her pronouns.) head appear wider. Poot Lovato's first mention was from a deleted Tumblr post by user Cstcrpt, which featured the edited image. The post wrote:

Demi’s twin sister. She was locked in a basement her whole life. This picture was taken the first time she went outside. Her name is Poot.

Previously, a week before that post, a Tumblr user named Versaceslut posted a crude doodle of Demi Lovato. The sketch was based on the edited image used for Poot Lovato. The meme went viral in October 2015.

== Reception ==
On October 12, a fanfiction called The Secret Life of Poot Lovato was posted on Wattpad. Since then, the story has garnered over 750,000 reads. In August 2023, Demi Lovato posted a TikTok video in which she celebrated her 31st birthday with multiple birthday cakes. At the end of the video, she panned over to a box of cupcakes, each decorated with an image of Poot. Originally, Demi Lovato thought that the meme going viral "sucked" since she presumed the photo of Poot was a real picture of her, but she was later reassured once she found out the photo was edited. Time Magazine published a list of "the 16 most influential fictional characters of 2015." Poot Lovato was placed in 15th place. Time noted that the meme was an example of "how Internet fandom can redefine celebrities’ carefully groomed images." Poot Lovato's Wikipedia page was previously deleted for being a hoax.

On October 30, 2025, Lovato recreated a Poot Lovato costume for Halloween on her TikTok page.
