= It's Not That Deep =

2025 studio album by Demi Lovato

- Standard edition cover

Studio album by Demi Lovato
- Released: October 24, 2025
- Studios: Westlake Recording Studios (Los Angeles, California); Laurelvale Studios (Studio City, California); Facet Studios (West Hollywood, California)
- Genre: Dance-pop
- Length: 32:27
- Labels: DLG; Island; Republic
- Producers: Leland; Oscar Linnader; Keith Sorrells; Zhone

Demi Lovato chronology
Revamped (2023)	It's Not That Deep (2025)

Singles from It's Not That Deep
- 1. "Fast" Released: August 1, 2025; 2. "Here All Night" Released: September 12, 2025; 3. "Kiss" Released: October 10, 2025

Singles from It's Not That Deep (Unless You Want It to Be)
- 1. "Low Rise Jeans" Released: April 17, 2026

It's Not That Deep is the ninth studio album by the American singer Demi Lovato, released on October 24, 2025, through Island Records and her (Note: Lovato uses both she/her and they/them pronouns. This article uses she/her for consistency.) own imprint, DLG Recordings. (Note: Media publications mention the album's release under her own imprint, DLG Recordings, and streaming services note It's Not That Deep is served through her label under Island Records, a division of UMG Recordings.) It features a dance-pop production, marking a contrast to her previous rock-leaning projects, Holy Fvck (2022) and Revamped (2023). Zhone served as the album's executive producer and produced all of its tracks, with Leland, Oscar Linnander, and Keith Sorrells also contributing production. It's Not That Deep has spawned three singles: "Fast", "Here All Night", and "Kiss". The album received praise from music critics, and has charted within the top 40 in Australia, Belgium, New Zealand, Portugal, Spain, and the United States. Rolling Stone named it the ninety-eighth best album of 2025.

To accompany the album's release, Lovato performed a one night only show at the Hollywood Palladium. She also embarked on the It's Not That Deep Tour in North America, which ran from April to May 2026. A deluxe edition titled It's Not That Deep (Unless You Want It to Be) was released on April 24, 2026.

== Background and promotion ==
In 2024, Demi Lovato made her directorial debut with the documentary film Child Star, which centers on various child actors and their experiences with fame and public. During its development, she considered retiring from music after wondering if it still "fulfilled" her. Lovato later fell "back in love with music" thanks to the film and shared the song "You'll Be OK, Kid" as part of its soundtrack, while working on her next album. During September 2024, the singer stated that she was "figuring out" the sound of the album and writing "nothing but love songs and sexy songs". Lovato continued to experiment with different genres and also collaborated with the Mexican band Grupo Firme on the dance-pop single "Chula", released one month earlier.

She started teasing her return to music in 2025 with several videos to social media. That July, Lovato wiped her Instagram account and shared promotional pictures captioned with new lyrics. A snippet of an unreleased track was published to social media with the title "Fast". Later that month, the magazine Rolling Stone reported that the album was scheduled to be released the same year, and would have a dance-pop sound contrasting her previous rock-leaning projects (2022's Holy Fvck and 2023's Revamped). Zhone served as the album's executive producer.

On September 15, 2025, Lovato jokingly posted on Twitter that she was releasing her fifth documentary film, following the previous Demi Lovato: Dancing with the Devil (2021) and Child Star. The link attached in the post actually led to a pre-save link to her ninth album, titled It's Not That Deep. She later revealed its cover artwork and release date, October 24. The album features a dance-pop sound across 11 tracks. During an after-party with Paper, Lovato debuted a new song titled "Frequency". The album was released on the scheduled date alongside a live video for the song "Let You Go".

=== Live performances and tour ===
Lovato announced a one night only show at the Hollywood Palladium to promote It's Not That Deep on October 13, 2025, which later took place on October 25, 2025, a day after the album's release. Following the show, a North American concert tour produced by Live Nation Entertainment was announced, with Slovak singer Adéla as special guest. It began in Orlando, Florida at the Kia Center on April 13, 2026, and finished in Houston, Texas at the Toyota Center on May 25, 2026.

== Singles ==
"Fast" was distributed on August 1, 2025, as the album's lead single. The diva house and electropop song debuted at number 8 on Billboard's Hot Dance/Pop Songs chart, and has reached number 15 on the Bubbling Under Hot 100 chart. A remix package of the song was released, featuring an extended version of the song and remixes by British DJ Zac Samuel.

On September 12, 2025, "Here All Night" followed as its second single. A music video directed by Hannah Lux Davis was released along with the song. The dance-pop track charted at number 13 on Billboard's Hot Dance/Pop Songs chart. "Here All Night" was part of Lovato's setlist for Live from Roku City, an "interactive building" present on the screensaver for Roku streaming devices.

She released "Kiss" as the third single off the record on October 10, 2025. The electropop track was played before its release on several parties, and its music video was released along with the song.

"Low Rise Jeans" was released on April 17, 2026, as a single for the deluxe version of the album, It's Not That Deep (Unless You Want It to Be). The dance-pop song was performed before its release on the opening date of the It's Not That Deep Tour.

== Critical reception ==
Professional ratings
Aggregate scores
Source	Rating
AnyDecentMusic?	7.2/10
Metacritic	82/100
Review scores
Source	Rating
AllMusic	4/5 stars
Clash	7/10
The Independent	4/5 stars
The Line of Best Fit	8/10
The London Standard	4/5 stars
PopMatters	8/10
Rolling Stone	4/5 stars
Slant Magazine	3.5/5 stars

It's Not That Deep received widespread acclaim from critics. According to the review aggregator Metacritic, It's Not That Deep received "universal acclaim" based on a weighted average score of 82 out of 100 from seven critic scores. According to AnyDecentMusic?, which assigns a weighted average based on publication ratings, the album received a 7.2 out of 10 rating from eight reviews.

Rolling Stone critic Tomás Mier and The Independent writer Helen Brown rated the album four out of five stars. Mier praised the production, and wrote that "Lovato is back to the sound where she shines brightest". Brown concluded with "There's a lot of human heart pumping beneath the bangers here. Be prepared for your mascara/fire-pit kohl to get smudgy. Because It's Not That Deep actually sounds like the work of a woman who's done some serious digging in order to party this hard." David Cobbald from The Line of Best Fit scored the album eight out of ten. He felt that it "might just be Lovato's best effort yet" and "delivers successfully on its objective to keep things light and easy while dancing the night away". Rolling Stone named it the ninety-eighth best album of 2025.

== Commercial performance ==
In the United States, It's Not That Deep entered at number nine on the Billboard 200, becoming Lovato's 10th entry to reach its top 10. The album obtained 31,000 album-equivalent units in its first week, which consisted of 24,000 pure sales and 7,000 streaming equivalent units.

== Track listing ==
It's Not That Deep track listing
No.	Title	Writer(s)	Length
1.	"Fast"	Demi Lovato; Chloe Angelides; Jake Torrey; Zhone	3:01
2.	"Here All Night"	Lovato; Alna Hofmeyr; Sarah Hudson; Brett McLaughlin; Zhone	2:56
3.	"Frequency"	Lovato; Hudson; Torrey; Zhone	2:43
4.	"Let You Go"	Lovato; Castle; Torrey; Zhone	3:03
5.	"Sorry to Myself"	Lovato; Kiddo; Justin Tranter; Zhone	3:25
6.	"Little Bit"	Lovato; Feli Ferraro; Torrey; Zhone	2:26
7.	"Say It"	Lovato; Ferraro; Torrey; Zhone	2:29
8.	"In My Head"	Oscar Linnander; Jordan Lutes; Charlotte Sands; Keith Sorrells; Zhone	2:54
9.	"Kiss"	Lovato; McLaughlin; Steph Jones; Torrey; Zhone	2:19
10.	"Before I Knew You"	Lovato; Castle; Travis Clark; Samuel Hollander; Dave Katz; Torrey; Zhone	2:56
11.	"Ghost"	Lovato; Jones; McLaughlin; Torrey; Zhone	4:15
Total length:			32:27

Digital D2C edition bonus tracks
No.	Title	Writer(s)	Length
12.	"Joshua Tree"	Lovato; Hickey; Tranter; Blush	3:23
13.	"Fantasy"	Lovato; Hickey; Torrey; Kiddo	2:22
Total length:			38:12

Little Bit Extra edition digital release bonus tracks
No.	Title	Writer(s)	Length
12.	"Joshua Tree"	Lovato; Hickey; Tranter; Blush	3:23
13.	"Let You Go" (live)	Lovato; Castle; Torrey; Zhone	3:16
14.	"Ghost" (piano demo)	Lovato; Jones; McLaughlin; Torrey; Zhone	2:28
Total length:			41:34

It's Not That Deep (Unless You Want It to Be) disc 1 track listing
No.	Title	Writer(s)	Producer(s)	Length
1.	"Low Rise Jeans"	Lovato; Uzoechi Emenike; Hudson; McLaughlin; Torrey; Zhone	Zhone	3:26
2.	"Love Controller"	Lovato; James Abrahart; Jason Evigan; Hudson; Jessie Ware; Zhone	Evigan; Mitch Allan^{[a]}	2:59
3.	"Fantasy" (featuring Cobrah)	Lovato; Cobrah; Kiddo; Torrey; Zhone	Zhone	2:21
4.	"Confetti"	Lovato; Ferraro; Hickey; Torrey	Zhone	2:38
5.	"Joshua Tree" (featuring Rose Gray)	Lovato; Hickey; Tranter; Blush	Zhone	3:23
6.	"After Hours"	Lovato; Abrahart; Hofmeyr; Hudson; Zhone	Zhone	2:25
7.	"Nothing On but the Lights"	Lovato; Emenike; Margo XS; Zhone	MNEK; Margo XS; Zhone	2:56
8.	"Pretty Catatonic"	Lovato; Julia Michaels; Hickey; Jones	Zhone	2:48
Total length:				55:25

Notes

- ^{^[a]} denotes vocal producer
- "Joshua Tree" was also included as a bonus track on a special LP edition of the album.
- "Confetti" was also included as a bonus track on an iTunes Store extended edition of the album.
- Disc 2 of It's Not That Deep (Unless You Want It to Be) reflects the standard track listing of the album.

== Personnel ==
Credits were adapted from Tidal.

- Demi Lovato – vocals
- Zhone – production, engineering, recording, keyboards, programming (all tracks); background vocals (tracks 2, 4), percussion (1, 3–10)
- Manny Marroquin – mixing (1, 4, 6, 8, 10, 11)
- Jeremie Inhaber – mixing (2, 3, 5, 7, 9)
- Francesco Di Giovanni – mixing assistance (1, 4, 6, 8, 10, 11)
- Ramiro Fernandez-Seoane – mixing assistance (1, 4, 6, 8, 10, 11)
- Nathan Dantzler – mastering
- Harrison Tate – mastering assistance
- Jake Torrey – keyboards (1, 10, 11)
- Leland – production, background vocals (2)
- Alna Hofmeyr – background vocals (2)
- Sarah Hudson – background vocals (2)
- Keith Sorrells – production (8)
- Oscar Linnander – production (8)
- Charlotte Sands – background vocals (8)
- Oliver Hill – strings (11)

== Charts ==
Chart performance
Chart (2025)	Peak position
Australian Albums (ARIA)	35
Belgian Albums (Ultratop Flanders)	20
Belgian Albums (Ultratop Wallonia)	87
Dutch Albums (Album Top 100)	76
French Albums (SNEP)	184
New Zealand Albums (RMNZ)	35
Polish Albums (ZPAV)	51
Portuguese Albums (AFP)	34
Scottish Albums (Official Charts)	51
Spanish Albums (PROMUSICAE)	31
UK Albums (OCC)	118
US Billboard 200	9
US Top Dance Albums (Billboard)	1

== Release history ==
Release dates and formats
Region	Date	Edition	Format(s)	Label	Ref.
Various	October 24, 2025	Standard	CD; vinyl LP; cassette; digital download; streaming	Island	
United States	October 24, 2025	Bonus track	Vinyl LP	Island	
United Kingdom	October 24, 2025	Bonus track	Vinyl LP	Island	
United States	October 28, 2025	D2C bonus tracks	Digital download	Island	
Various	October 31, 2025	Extended	Digital download	Island	
Various	November 21, 2025	Little Bit Extra	Digital download; streaming	Island	
Various	April 24, 2026	Deluxe	Digital download; streaming	Island	
