= Kiss (Demi Lovato song) =

2025 single by Demi Lovato

Single by Demi Lovato

from the album It's Not That Deep
- Released: October 10, 2025
- Studio: Laurelvale Studios (Studio City, California)
- Genre: Electropop
- Length: 2:19
- Label: DLG; Island
- Songwriters: Demi Lovato; Brett McLaughlin; Jake Torrey; Steph Jones; Zhone
- Producer: Zhone

Demi Lovato singles chronology
"Here All Night" (2025)	"Kiss" (2025)	"Low Rise Jeans" (2026)

Music video
- "Kiss" on YouTube

"Kiss" is a song by the American singer Demi Lovato. She wrote it alongside Leland, Jake Torrey, Steph Jones, and its producer, Zhone. The song was released through DLG Recordings and Island Records on October 10, 2025, as the third single from Lovato's ninth studio album, It's Not That Deep (2025).

== Release ==
In mid-2025, Demi Lovato started promoting her ninth studio album, It's Not That Deep, released on October 24 through DLG Recordings and Island Records. It was billed as a dance-pop record that remarked Lovato's desire to "enjoy life and have fun": "I'm happy, I'm in love [...] I realized it's not that deep anymore, and that became the ethos for this album." Lovato played the then-unreleased song "Kiss" at several parties, including at the Loose club in Los Angeles, an album-themed Paper launch party, and at the Silencio club in Paris, France.

Lovato announced the release of "Kiss" on October 8, 2025, with a cryptic post captioned "let's kiss... friday". "Kiss" was released on October 10, 2025, as the third single from It's Not That Deep, following "Fast" and "Here All Night". The song was accompanied by a music video starring Lovato walking around several couples kissing. Alongside the song's release, Lovato unveiled the album's tracklist, containing "Kiss" as the ninth song. The singer played it at MISTR's National PrEP Day party in Los Angeles.

== Reception ==
Billboard's Stephen Daw included "Kiss" on their Queer Jams of the Week list, and described it as an electropop track that aligns with the theme of the album: "Demi is here to have a good time, period." The critic found resemblance with the "carefree vibes" of Lovato's songs "Really Don't Care" (2014) and "Cool for the Summer" (2015), "but this time with her tongue firmly planted in her cheek and her lips curled into a smirk".

== Track listing ==
- Streaming/digital download
1. "Kiss" – 2:19
2. "Here All Night" – 2:56
3. "Fast" – 3:01
- Streaming/digital download – remixes
1. "Kiss" – 2:19
2. "Kiss" (Tropkillaz remix) – 2:32
3. "Kiss" (GAG remix; featuring Zoe Gitter and Alex Chapman) – 2:06

== Charts ==
Chart performance
Chart (2025–2026)	Peak position
Costa Rica Anglo Airplay (Monitor Latino)	12
Guatemala Anglo Airplay (Monitor Latino)	9
Israel International TV Airplay (Media Forest)	3
New Zealand Hot Singles (RMNZ)	39
Nicaragua Anglo Airplay (Monitor Latino)	4
US Dance Digital Song Sales (Billboard)	6
Venezuela Anglo Airplay (Monitor Latino)	8

== Release history ==
Release dates and formats
Region	Date	Format	Version	Label	Ref.
Various	October 10, 2025	Digital download; streaming	Original	Island	
Italy	October 16, 2025	Radio airplay	Original	Island	
Various	December 29, 2025	Digital download; streaming	Remixes	Island	
