= Fast (Demi Lovato song) =

2025 single by Demi Lovato

Single by Demi Lovato

from the album It's Not That Deep
- Released: August 1, 2025
- Studio: Westlake Recording Studios (Los Angeles, California)
- Genre: Diva house; electropop
- Length: 3:01
- Label: DLG; Island; Republic
- Songwriters: Demi Lovato; Jake Torrey; Chloe Angelides; Kevin Hickey
- Producer: Zhone

Demi Lovato singles chronology
"Chula" (2024)	"Fast" (2025)	"Here All Night" (2025)

Music video
- "Fast" on YouTube

"Fast" is a song by the American singer Demi Lovato. It was released through her own imprint label, DLG Recordings, under exclusive license to Island Records on August 1, 2025, as the lead single from her ninth studio album, It's Not That Deep (2025). She wrote the track with Jake Torrey, Chloe Angelides, and its producer, Kevin "Zhone" Hickey. The diva house and electropop song was marketed as Lovato's return to pop music, with reviews noting it contains elements of EDM and dance-pop.

Daniel Sachon directed the accompanying music video for "Fast", which premiered alongside the single. The video follows Lovato walking through city streets while chaotic situations occur around her, and includes references to internet memes featuring the singer. As part of the song's promotion, she hosted a fan event at the Bigg Chill, a frozen yogurt shop Lovato had criticized years prior as part of a public controversy. "Fast" received a nomination for Song of Summer at the 2025 MTV Video Music Awards. It also reached the top ten on the airplay charts in Belarus, Kazakhstan, and Latvia.

== Background ==
I tend to write from the place I'm in at the moment. Lately, it's been amazing — I've been writing nothing but love songs and sexy songs because I'm in a really good place. It feels good to be able to create from that space.

— Demi Lovato, People

"Fast" marks a return to pop after Lovato's 2022 punk-rock album Holy Fvck. The song was first teased through video snippets on social media, highlighting its EDM-influenced sound. Its release suggests a musical shift back toward the style of her earlier pop songs such as "Cool for the Summer" and "Sorry Not Sorry". Prior to the release of Holy Fvck, Lovato symbolically declared the end of her pop era by posting a photo on Instagram dressed in black with their team, captioned "A funeral for my pop music". The promotion of "Fast" signaled a reemergence of that earlier sound.

== Promotion and release ==
Lovato started teasing new music in 2025 with several videos to social media. That July, she wiped her Instagram account and shared promotional pictures captioned with new lyrics. An snippet of an unreleased track was published to social media with the title "Fast". On July 30, 2025, Lovato hosted a fan event in the Bigg Chill, a frozen yogurt shop she had criticized as part of a public controversy in 2021. She also shared videos filmed at the store using a previous viral audio from her apology years prior.

"Fast" was released on August 1, 2025, through Island Records, as the first single from Lovato's ninth studio album, It's Not That Deep (2025). The single was sent to Italian radio airplay by Universal Music Group on the same date, and is set to be issued in a 7-inch single format on October 31, 2025, with a "Gravagerz remix" as its B-side. Its initial release was accompanied by a music video that Daniel Sachon directed, which features Lovato walking through city streets while she sings the lyrics and different chaotic situations occur around her, including car explosions and people running around in their underwear. The singer later passes by a display of television screens projecting several internet memes that had featured her, including a clip from the show Unidentified with Demi Lovato (2021) and the fictional character Poot Lovato. At the end of the video, she arrives on a nightclub dance floor.

== Composition ==
"Fast" is three minutes and one second long. Sonically, it is a diva house, electronic, and electropop song with EDM and dance-pop elements On "Fast", Lovato sings, "Cuz baby honestly / I just wanna feel your hands all over me (over and over) / Right where they wanna be / Even if it's only for tonight". Writing for USA Today, Anna Kaufman likened "Fast" with the synth-pop sound of Lovato's 2015 single "Cool for the Summer".

== Reception ==
Rolling Stone writer Tomás Mier described it as a stellar album rollout. Joseph Ine from the Melodic Magazine praised the track as an "exciting return" for Lovato, and thought that the accompanying music video "perfectly captures this new chapter in Demi's career". At the 2025 MTV Video Music Awards, "Fast" received a nomination for the social category Song of Summer, losing to "Just Keep Watching" by Tate McRae.

== Track listing ==
- 7-inch vinyl single
1. "Fast" – 3:01
2. "Fast" (Gravagerz remix)
- Streaming/digital download
1. "Fast" – 3:01
- Streaming/digital download – extended version + remixes EP
1. "Fast" – 3:01
2. "Fast" (extended) – 4:44
3. "Fast" (Zac Samuel remix) – 3:19
4. "Fast" (Zac Samuel extended remix) – 5:19

== Personnel ==
Credits were adapted from Apple Music.

- Demi Lovato – vocals, songwriting
- Kevin "Zhone" Hickey – songwriting, programming, keyboards, percussion, recording engineer, production
- Jake Torrey – keyboards, songwriting
- Chloe Angelides – songwriting
- Manny Marroquin – mixing engineer
- Ramiro Fernandez-Seoane – assistant mixing engineer
- Francesco Di Giovanni – assistant mixing engineer
- Nathan Dantzler – mastering engineer
- Joe Grasso – immersive mixing
- Augusto Sanchez – immersive mixing

== Charts ==
=== Weekly charts ===
Weekly chart performance for "Fast"
Chart (2025–2026)	Peak position
Argentina Anglo Airplay (Monitor Latino)	15
Belarus Airplay (TopHit)	2
Bolivia Anglo Airplay (Monitor Latino)	14
Canada CHR/Top 40 (Billboard)	37
Central America Anglo Airplay (Monitor Latino)	15
Chile Anglo Airplay (Monitor Latino)	11
CIS Airplay (TopHit)	20
Croatia International Airplay (Top lista)	96
Dominican Republic Anglo Airplay (Monitor Latino)	8
Ecuador Anglo Airplay (Monitor Latino)	5
Guatemala Anglo Airplay (Monitor Latino)	6
Kazakhstan Airplay (TopHit)	4
Latvia Airplay (TopHit)	2
Moldova Airplay (TopHit)	34
New Zealand Hot Singles (RMNZ)	12
Nicaragua Anglo Airplay (Monitor Latino)	6
Panama Anglo Airplay (Monitor Latino)	9
Russia Airplay (TopHit)	21
Slovakia Airplay (ČNS IFPI)	49
UK Dance (Official Charts)	30
UK Singles Sales (OCC)	49
Uruguay Anglo Airplay (Monitor Latino)	12
US Bubbling Under Hot 100 (Billboard)	15
US Dance Digital Song Sales (Billboard)	4
US Dance Streaming Songs (Billboard)	11
US Hot Dance/Pop Songs (Billboard)	8

=== Monthly charts ===
Monthly chart performance for "Fast"
Chart (2025)	Peak position
Belarus Airplay (TopHit)	4
CIS Airplay (TopHit)	22
Kazakhstan Airplay (TopHit)	6
Latvia Airplay (TopHit)	3
Moldova Airplay (TopHit)	38
Russia Airplay (TopHit)	21

=== Year-end charts ===
Year-end chart performance for "Fast"
Chart (2025)	Position
Belarus Airplay (TopHit)	62
CIS Airplay (TopHit)	112
Kazakhstan Airplay (TopHit)	48
Latvia Airplay (TopHit)	10
Russia Airplay (TopHit)	84

== Certifications ==
Certifications for "Fast"
Region	Certification	Certified units/sales
Brazil (Pro-Música Brasil)	Platinum	40,000^{‡}
^{‡} Sales+streaming figures based on certification alone.

== Release history ==
"Fast" release history
Region	Date	Format	Version	Label	Ref.
Various	August 1, 2025	Digital download; streaming	Original	Island	
Italy	August 1, 2025	Radio airplay	Original	Universal	
Various	August 22, 2025	Digital download; streaming	Extended version + remixes EP	Island	
Various	October 31, 2025	7-inch vinyl	Original	Island	
