= Here All Night =

2025 single by Demi Lovato

Single by Demi Lovato

from the album It's Not That Deep
- Released: September 12, 2025
- Studio: Laurelvale Studios (Studio City, California)
- Genre: Dance-pop
- Length: 2:56
- Label: DLG; Island
- Composers: Brett McLaughlin; Kevin Hickey
- Lyricists: Demi Lovato; Alna Hofmeyr; Sarah Hudson
- Producers: Zhone; Leland

Demi Lovato singles chronology
"Fast" (2025)	"Here All Night" (2025)	"Kiss" (2025)

Music video
- "Here All Night" on YouTube

"Here All Night" is a song by the American singer Demi Lovato. It was released on September 12, 2025, through Island Records and her own imprint label, DLG Recordings, as the second single from her ninth studio album, It's Not That Deep (2025). Produced by Zhone, the track continues Lovato's shift back to pop following several years of rock-focused music.

The song was written as a breakup narrative from the perspective of a character and was released alongside a music video directed by Hannah Lux Davis. It has been described as an uptempo, dance-oriented pop track built around an electronic beat, with critics highlighting its energetic sound and placement within Lovato's new musical era.

== Promotion and release ==
On September 4, 2025, Lovato shared a teaser video for a new song believed to be titled "Here All Night". The clip followed the release of her August single "Fast", which marked Lovato's return to pop after several years exploring a rock sound. In the video, Lovato is seen performing in fishnet tights and a sparkly black thong while singing along to the track, previewing lyrics such as "Sweating on the dance floor under the lights to get over you" and "I'll be here all night". After several days of teasing, Lovato officially announced on September 9, 2025, that "Here All Night" would be released on September 12.

The song was released with an accompanying music video directed by Hannah Lux Davis. Lovato mentioned that the song was conceived with a dance-focused video in mind, intended to reflect its themes of moving through heartbreak.

== Composition ==
Lyrically, Lovato called the track "a breakup song I wrote by channeling a character, and it was so freeing to step into someone else's story". Carl Smith of the Official Charts Company dubbed it an "unapologetic dance-pop banger". Rolling Stone writer Emily Zemler described "Here All Night" as an uptempo, dance-ready track produced by Zhone. Built around a pulsating electronic beat, the song features lyrics such as "Begging for the bass 'til it's hitting me right / Sweatin' on the dance floor under the lights / To get over you / I'll be here all night". The track runs for 2 minutes and 56 seconds.

== Critical reception ==
Vulture contributor Alejandra Gularte described "Here All Night" as a high-energy, danceable track, noting that along with Lovato's previous single "Fast", it signals no plans of slowing down in her new era.

== Live performances ==
Lovato first performed "Here All Night" as part of Live from Roku City, an interactive virtual building featured on the Roku screensaver. The performance, directed by Hannah Lux Davis, also included a cover of Whitney Houston's "I Wanna Dance with Somebody (Who Loves Me)" (1987). On October 22, 2025, Lovato performed the track along with a medley of Lady Gaga's "Disease" and "Perfect Celebrity" on BBC Radio 1's Live Lounge. The song was also featured on the setlist for Lovato's One Night Only at the Palladium concert.

== Track listing ==
- Streaming/digital download
1. "Here All Night" – 2:56
- Streaming/digital download – remixes
1. "Here All Night" – 2:56
2. "Here All Night" (Inji remix) – 2:55
3. "Here All Night" (Banoffee remix) – 3:48

== Charts ==
=== Weekly charts ===
Chart performance
Chart (2025–2026)	Peak position
Costa Rica Anglo Airplay (Monitor Latino)	11
Ecuador Anglo Airplay (Monitor Latino)	8
Lithuania Airplay (TopHit)	36
Malta Airplay (Radiomonitor)	15
New Zealand Hot Singles (RMNZ)	19
Serbia Airplay (Radiomonitor)	19
Slovakia Airplay (ČNS IFPI)	100
UK Singles Sales (OCC)	56
US Dance Digital Song Sales (Billboard)	4
US Hot Dance/Pop Songs (Billboard)	13

=== Monthly charts ===
Monthly chart performance
Chart (2025)	Peak position
Lithuania Airplay (TopHit)	48

== Certifications ==
Certifications and sales
Region	Certification	Certified units/sales
Brazil (Pro-Música Brasil)	Gold	20,000^{‡}
^{‡} Sales+streaming figures based on certification alone.

== Release history ==
Release dates and formats
Region	Date	Format	Version	Label	Ref.
Various	September 12, 2025	Digital download; streaming	Original	Island	
Italy	September 18, 2025	Radio airplay	Original	Island	
Various	October 1, 2025	Digital download; streaming	Remixes	Island	
