= Aly & AJ discography =

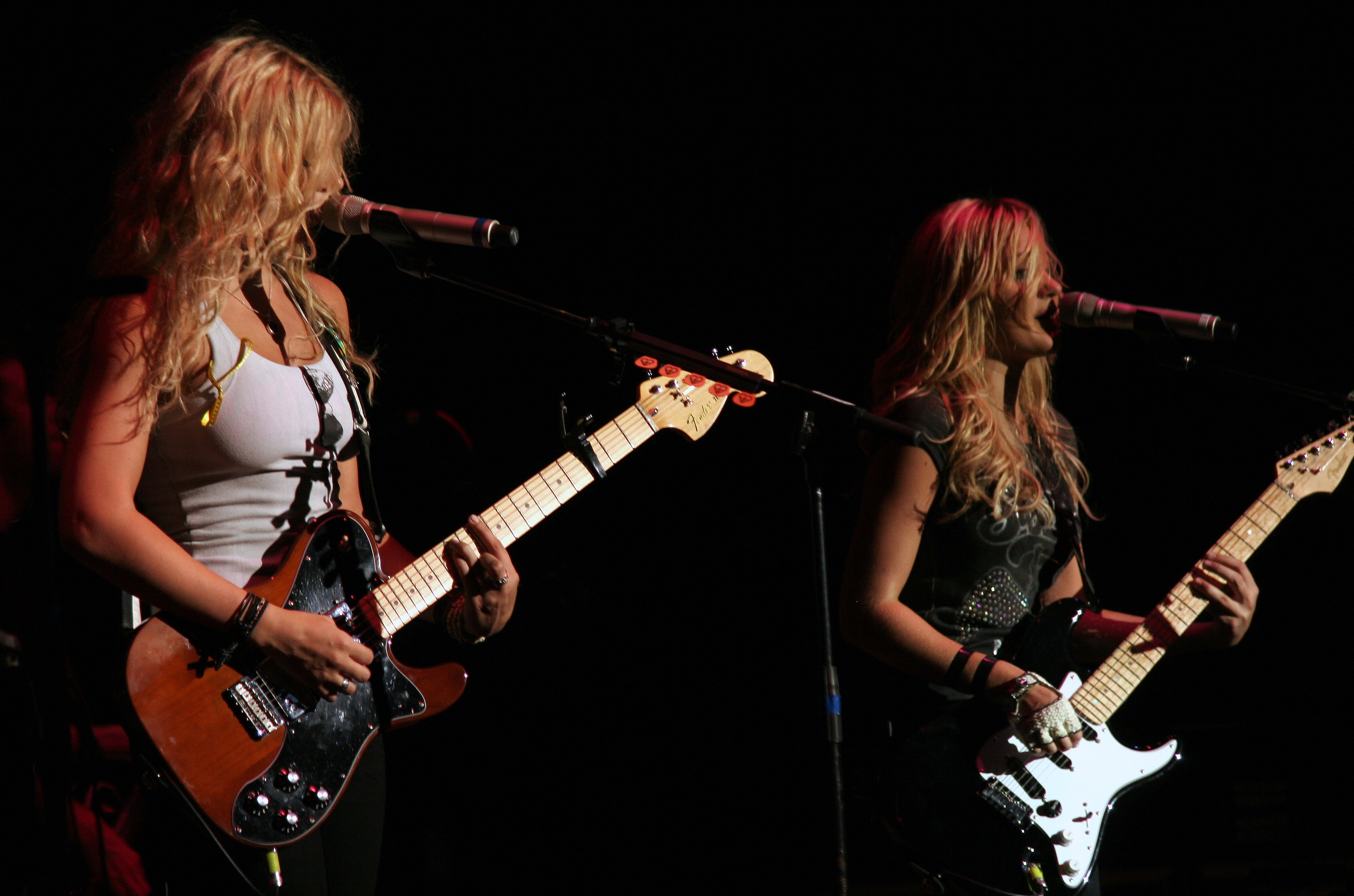
- Aly & AJ on Brock Storm concert, in Valdosta, Georgia, in 2008.
- Studio albums: 5
- Extended plays: 2
- Compilation albums: 2
- Singles: 32
- Video albums: 1
- Music videos: 21

The discography of Aly & AJ (briefly known as 78violet), an American pop rock duo, consists of five studio albums, one video album, two extended plays and compilation albums, 32 singles, 10 music videos and various album appearances. They released their debut studio album Into the Rush on August 17, 2005. The album debuted at number 36 in the United States, selling over 24,000 copies in its first week and was later certified Gold by the RIAA. Into the Rush earned them the "Contemporary Inspirational Artists of the Year" nomination at the 2006 American Music Awards. Into the Rush has sold 839,000 copies in the United States and 1,000,000 worldwide.

In 2006, the duo released their second studio and first Holiday album, Acoustic Hearts of Winter, which peaked at 78 on the Billboard 200 and sold 110,000 copies. Their third studio album, Insomniatic, debuted at number 15 on the Billboard 200, selling over 39,000 copies in its first week, making it their highest debut to date. The album's lead single, "Potential Breakup Song", is their most successful single to date, it was certified Platinum and managed to peak at number 17 on Billboard Hot 100, becoming their first top 20 and international hit.

In 2013, the duo released a single under the name '78violet' titled "Hothouse", which was their only single release under this name. In 2017, the duo returned with a new single titled "Take Me," which was released under their original name. They have since released various songs that have been compiled onto an album, We Don't Stop (2020), and released their fourth studio album in May 2021, their first album in 14 years. On March 15, 2023, they released With Love From. Silver Deliverer was released on May 2, 2025.

== Albums ==
=== Studio albums ===
List of albums, with selected chart positions and certifications
Title	Album details	Peak chart positions			Sales	Certifications
Title	Album details	US	JPN	UK	Sales	Certifications
Into the Rush	Released: August 16, 2005; Label: Hollywood; Format: CD, LP, digital download	36	94	—	US: 839,000	RIAA: Platinum
Acoustic Hearts of Winter	Released: September 26, 2006; Label: Hollywood; Format: CD, digital download	78	—	—	US: 110,000	
Insomniatic	Released: July 10, 2007; Label: Hollywood; Format: CD, LP, digital download	15	90	72	US: 700,000	
A Touch of the Beat ...	Released: May 7, 2021; Label: Aly & AJ Music; Format: LP, CD, streaming, digital download	— (Note: A Touch of the Beat Gets You Up on Your Feet Gets You Out and Then Into the Sun did not enter the US Billboard 200, but did peak at number 96 on the Current Album Sales chart.)	—	— (Note: A Touch of the Beat Gets You Up on Your Feet Gets You Out and Then Into the Sun did not enter the UK Top 100 Albums Chart, but peaked at number 40 on the UK Download Albums chart.)		
With Love From	Released: March 15, 2023; Label: Aly & AJ Music; Format: LP, CD, cassette, streaming, digital download	–	–	–		
Silver Deliverer	Released: May 2, 2025; Label: Aly & AJ Music; Format: LP, CD, cassette, streaming, digital download	–	–	–		
"—" denotes releases that did not chart or were not released in that territory.

=== Compilation albums ===
Title	Album details
Sanctuary, Vol. 1: 78violet (The Unreleased Album)	Released: November 6, 2020; Label: Aly & AJ Music LLC; Format: LP
We Don't Stop	Released: November 30, 2020; Label: Aly & AJ Music LLC; Format: Streaming, digital download, LP
Sanctuary, Vol. 2: A Touch of the Beat Instrumentals	Released: December 2022; Label: Aly & AJ Music LLC; Format: LP
Sanctuary, Vol. 3: a touch of the beat gets you up on your feet gets you out and then into the sun Live in Concert at the Theatre at Ace Hotel	Released: August 2023; Label: Aly & AJ Music LLC; Format: LP
Sanctuary, Vol. 4: Like Whoa (A&A Version)/Chemicals React (A&A Version)	Released: August 2023; Label: Aly & AJ Music LLC; Format: LP
Sanctuary, Vol. 5: The Lost Album	Released: 2025; Label: Aly & AJ Music LLC; Format: LP

=== Video albums ===
Title	Album details	Peak chart position
Title	Album details	US Video
On the Ride	Released: April 4, 2006; Label: Hollywood; Format: DVD	10
Fav Five - Let Me Repeat That	Released: November 20, 2007; Label: Hollywood; Format: Digital download	—

== Extended plays ==
Title	Album details	Charts
Title	Album details	US Indie
Ten Years	Released: November 17, 2017; Label: Aly & AJ Music LLC; Format: LP, CD, digital download, streaming	25
Sanctuary	Released: May 10, 2019; Label: Aly & AJ Music LLC; Format: LP, CD, streaming, digital download	29
Lonesome Dove	Released: November 14, 2023; Label: Aly & AJ Music LLC; Format: LP, streaming, digital download	–
More Silver	Released: September 19, 2025; Label: Aly & AJ Music LLC; Format: LP, CD, streaming, digital download	–

== Singles ==
List of singles, with selected chart positions and certifications
Title	Year	Peak chart positions									Certifications	Album
Title	Year	US	US Christ	AUS	CAN	IRE	NLD	NOR	SCO	UK	Certifications	Album
"Do You Believe in Magic"	2005	— (Note: "Do You Believe in Magic" did not enter the Billboard Hot 100 but peaked at number two on the Hot Singles Sales component chart.)	—	—	—	—	—	—	—	—		Into the Rush
"No One"	2005	—	—	—	—	—	—	—	—	—		Into the Rush
"Walking on Sunshine"	2005	—	—	—	—	—	—	—	—	—		Into the Rush
"Never Far Behind"	2005	—	28	—	—	—	—	—	—	—		Into the Rush
"Rush"	2006	59	—	—	—	—	—	—	—	—	RIAA: Gold	Into the Rush
"On the Ride"	2006	—	—	—	—	—	—	—	—	—		Into the Rush
"Chemicals React"	2006	50	—	—	—	—	—	—	—	—		Into the Rush
"Greatest Time of Year"	2006	96	—	—	—	—	—	—	—	—		Acoustic Hearts of Winter
"Potential Breakup Song"	2007	17	—	—	72	16	83	18	31	22	RIAA: 2× Platinum; BPI: Silver	Insomniatic
"Like Whoa"	2008	63	—	92	66	—	—	—	—	165	RIAA: Gold	Insomniatic
"Hothouse" (as 78violet)	2013	—	—	—	—	—	—	—	—	—		Non-album Single
"Take Me"	2017	—	—	—	—	—	—	—	—	—		Ten Years
"I Know"	2017	—	—	—	—	—	—	—	—	—		Ten Years
"Good Love"	2018	—	—	—	—	—	—	—	—	—		Ten Years
"Church"	2019	—	—	—	—	—	—	—	—	—		Sanctuary
"Don't Go Changing"	2019	—	—	—	—	—	—	—	—	—		Sanctuary
"Star Maps"	2019	—	—	—	—	—	—	—	—	—		Sanctuary
"Attack of Panic"	2020	—	—	—	—	—	—	—	—	—		We Don't Stop
"Joan of Arc on the Dance Floor"	2020	—	—	—	—	—	—	—	—	—		We Don't Stop
"Slow Dancing"	2020	—	—	—	—	—	—	—	—	—		A Touch of the Beat...
"Potential Breakup Song (Explicit)"	2020	— (Note: "Potential Breakup Song (2020)" did not enter the US Billboard Hot 100, but did peak at number eight on the Digital Song Sales chart.)	—	—	—	—	—	—	—	—		Non-album single
"Listen!!!"	2021	—	—	—	—	—	—	—	—	—		A Touch of the Beat...
"Pretty Places"	2021	—	—	—	—	—	—	—	—	—		A Touch of the Beat...
"Symptom of Your Touch"	2021	—	—	—	—	—	—	—	—	—		A Touch of the Beat...
"Don't Need Nothing"	2021	—	—	—	—	—	—	—	—	—		A Touch of the Beat...
"I Need My Girl"	2021	—	—	—	—	—	—	—	—	—		Non-album single
"Get Over Here" (Note: Included on the deluxe edition of A Touch of the Beat....)	2021	—	—	—	—	—	—	—	—	—		A Touch of the Beat...
"Am I Alright"	2021	—	—	—	—	—	—	—	—	—		A Touch of the Beat...
"Dead on the Beach"	2022	—	—	—	—	—	—	—	—	—		A Touch of the Beat...
"Like Whoa" (A&A version)	2022	—	—	—	—	—	—	—	—	—		Non-album single
"Chemicals React" (A&A version)	2022	—	—	—	—	—	—	—	—	—		Non-album single
"With Love From"	2022	—	—	—	—	—	—	—	—	—		With Love From
"Baby Lay Your Head Down"	2023	—	—	—	—	—	—	—	—	—		With Love From
"After Hours"	2023	—	—	—	—	—	—	—	—	—		With Love From
"Blue Dress"	2023	—	—	—	—	—	—	—	—	—		With Love From
"Sirens"	2024	—	—	—	—	—	—	—	—	—		Silver Deliverer
"What It Feels Like"	2025	—	—	—	—	—	—	—	—	—		Silver Deliverer
"Next to Nothing"	2025	—	—	—	—	—	—	—	—	—		Silver Deliverer
"If You Get Lonely"	2025	—	—	—	—	—	—	—	—	—		Silver Deliverer
"Dandelions"	2025	—	—	—	—	—	—	—	—	—		Silver Deliverer
"Year of the Horse"	2026	—	—	—	—	—	—	—	—	—		
"—" denotes releases that did not chart or were not released in that territory.

== Other appearances ==
Title	Year	Other artist(s)	Album
"Jingle Bell Rock"	2004	—N/a	Radio Disney Jingle Jams
"Zip-a-Dee-Doo-Dah"	2005	—N/a	Disneymania 3
"We're an American Band"	2008	Randy Jackson	Randy Jackson's Music Club, Vol. 1
"Belong Here" (as 78violet)	2010	—N/a	Hellcats

== Music videos ==
=== As lead artist ===
List of music videos as lead artist, showing year released and director(s)
Title	Year	Director
"Do You Believe in Magic"	2005	
"No One"	2005	
"Walking on Sunshine"	2005	
"Rush"	2006	Marc Webb
"On the Ride"	2006	
"Chemicals React"	2006	Chris Applebaum
"Greatest Time of Year"	2006	Declan Whitebloom
"Potential Breakup Song"	2007	Chris Applebaum
"Like Whoa"	2007	Scott Speer
"Hothouse"	2013	Stephen Ringer
"Take Me"	2017	Alex Ross Perry
"Church"	2019	Alex Ross Perry
"Don't Go Changing"	2019	Alex Ross Perry
"Star Maps"	2019	Amanda Crew
"Attack of Panic"	2020	Stephen Ringer
"Joan of Arc on the Dance Floor"	2020	Aly Michalka & Stephen Ringer
"Slow Dancing"	2020	Stephen Ringer
"Listen!!!"	2021	Susanna Howe
"Pretty Places"	2021	Michelle Laine & Stephen Ringer
"Symptom of Your Touch"	2021	Stephen Ringer
"Don't Need Nothing"	2021	Stephen Ringer
"Dead on the Beach"	2022	Stephen Ringer
"With Love From"	2022	Stephen Ringer

=== Guest appearances ===
List of music videos as guest, showing year released and director(s)
Title	Year	Director(s)
"Malibu" (At Home Edition) (Kim Petras)	2020	Kim Petras
