= Boogie Superstar =

2008 video game

- PAL version cover art
- Developer: EA Montreal
- Publisher: Electronic Arts
- Platform: Wii
- Release: NA: October 14, 2008; AU: October 16, 2008; EU: October 17, 2008
- Genre: Rhythm game
- Modes: Single-player, multiplayer

Boogie Superstar is a rhythm video game by Electronic Arts and a sequel to the game Boogie.

NGamer magazine initially reported that the title would support the Wii Balance Board, writing that it was to be a "board-based dance-a-thon", but Electronic Arts confirmed that while the title includes a microphone to sing along to, it does not support the Wii Balance Board.

== Gameplay ==
Like the original game, Boogie Superstar features both singing and dancing. The game is based around the premise of a talent contest.

The karaoke gameplay is similar to other singing games such as SingStar and Karaoke Revolution. To score, the player must sing in time and in tune with the lyrics as they scroll at the bottom of the screen, with a musical staff to indicate the correct pitch and where the player's current pitch is. Rather than using phonetic detection, the game bases the score on how well the player matches the rhythm and pitch.

In contrast to the freestyle dancing in the last game, the game mechanic in Boogie Superstar involves players waggling the Wii Remote to simple two-beat prompts, such as swinging the Remote side-to side or up and down in time to on screen directions.

== Track listing ==
Boogie Superstar features over 40 songs, all cover versions. Some songs are only playable in either the singing or dancing part of the game. The song list includes the following:

- "Angel", "Love Like This", "Pocketful of Sunshine" - Natasha Bedingfield
- "Dance Like There's No Tomorrow" - Paula Abdul
- "Bullseye", "Like Whoa", "Potential Breakup Song" - Aly & AJ
- "The Great Escape" - Boys Like Girls
- "Everytime We Touch", "What Hurts the Most" - Cascada
- "Fancy Footwork" - Chromeo
- "Thnks fr th Mmrs", "Dance, Dance" (Best Buy exclusive) - Fall Out Boy
- "Glamorous" - Fergie
- "Elevator" (Note: Dancing only) - Flo Rida feat. Timbaland
- "Dance Floor Anthem (I Don't Want to Be in Love)" - Good Charlotte
- "Wake Up" - Hilary Duff
- "Hold On", "SOS", "That's Just the Way We Roll", "When You Look Me in the Eyes" - The Jonas Brothers
- "No One" - Alicia Keys
- "Take You There" - Sean Kingston
- "Girlfriend" - Avril Lavigne
- "Bleeding Love" - Leona Lewis
- "Shake It" - Metro Station
- "What You Got" - Colby O'Donis
- "I Don't Think About It" - Emily Osment
- "Nine in the Afternoon" - Panic! at the Disco
- "Hot n Cold" - Katy Perry
- "Jump to the Rhythm" - Jordan Pruitt
- "Don't Stop the Music", "Shut Up and Drive" - Rihanna
- "Yahhh!" - Soulja Boy Tellem
- "Radar", "Toxic", "Piece of Me" (GameStop exclusive) - Britney Spears
- "He Said She Said" - Ashley Tisdale
- "Makes Me Wonder", "Won't Go Home Without You" (Target exclusive) - Maroon 5
- "Stronger" - Kanye West
- "Ching-a-Ling" - Missy Elliott

== Reception ==
Boogie Superstar received mixed reviews, with a Metacritic average of 67%.

The Official Nintendo Magazine in the UK was impressed with the game, and in a review in the Christmas 2008 edition, said that it "does what it does very well indeed". IGN was less enamoured, saying that Boogie Superstar was a "decent" dancing game, paired with an "awful" karaoke game.
