= Ainjel Emme =

American singer-songwriter

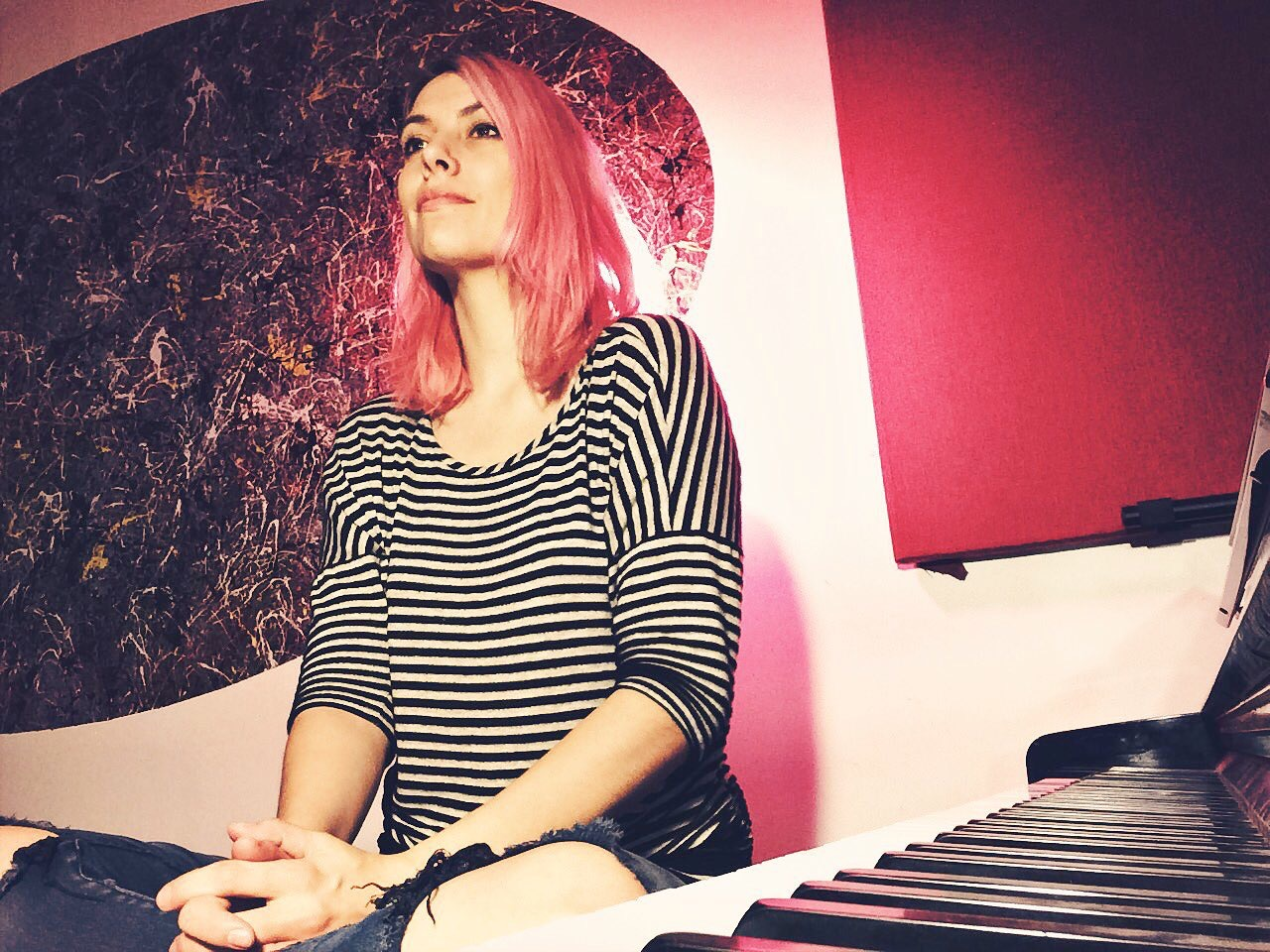
Emme in 2016

Ainjel Emme (born September 28, 1978) is an American singer-songwriter, record producer, and recording engineer. She has worked with artists such as David Bowie, Aly & AJ, Kristeen Young, Cherry Glazerr, Hazel English, and Nasty Cherry.

== Career ==
Emme started as an independent singer-songwriter before pivoting into working as a producer/engineer. She took an internship at a local recording studio in Los Angeles while living in her mother's walk-in closet. Emme then worked for Interscope Records.

As a record producer, Emme specializes in vocal production. Emme was the vocal producer for Aly & AJ's album A Touch of the Beat Gets You Up on Your Feet Gets You Out and Then Into the Sun (2021). Billboard included the album on their list of Best Albums in the first half of 2021, and the music video for "Pretty Places" has over 800k views.

Emme was vocal producer on the 2021 Metallica tribute, the Metallica Blacklist, on the track My Friend of Misery with artist Cherry Glazerr.

Emme was vocal producer and engineer for American Landfill, a track by Kristeen Young featuring David Bowie on the compilation album The Turning: Kate's Diary (an additional soundtrack for the film The Turning).

Emme has been vocal producer to Nasty Cherry. She was an engineer on Wake Up! by Australian-American indie pop musician Hazel English (2020).

== Singer-Songwriter ==
As a singer-songwriter, she has released two albums: Heartache Is Boring in 2003 and Everyone Is Beautiful in 2011. Emme performed on the Hello Kitty branded album Hello World under Hello Kitty's Lakeshore Records record label.

== Miscellaneous ==
Emme is a voting member of the Recording Academy (Production and Engineering Wing). Emme was a judge of the 2021 Hit Like a Girl drumming contest.

== Solo Discography ==
=== Albums ===
- Heartache Is Boring (2003) – Producer, songwriter, recording engineer, vocals, acoustic and electric guitars, drums, bass, piano, keys.
- Everyone Is Beautiful (2011) – Producer, songwriter, recording engineer, vocals, acoustic and electric guitars, drums, bass, piano, keys, programming.

=== EPs ===
- They Promised You America: Quiet Hour Demos Vol. 1 (2005) – Producer, songwriter, recording engineer, mixer, vocals, guitar, keys, percussion.
