= A Touch of the Beat Gets You Up on Your Feet Gets You Out and Then Into the Sun =

- Deluxe cover has a navy blue stripe where the title is

Studio album by Aly & AJ
- Released: May 7, 2021
- Recorded: 2019–2020
- Studio: Sunset Sound Recorders and Saturn Sound (Hollywood, California): Hansa Mixroom (Berlin, Germany)
- Genre: Pop; pop rock
- Length: 46:56
- Label: Aly & AJ Music; AWAL
- Producer: Yves Rothman

Aly & AJ chronology
Sanctuary (2019)	A Touch of the Beat Gets You Up on Your Feet Gets You Out and Then Into the Sun (2021)	With Love From (2023)

Singles from A Touch of the Beat Gets You Up on Your Feet Gets You Out and Then Into the Sun
- 1. "Slow Dancing" Released: December 2, 2020; 2. "Listen!!!" Released: January 15, 2021; 3. "Pretty Places" Released: March 5, 2021; 4. "Symptom of Your Touch" Released: April 9, 2021; 5. "Don't Need Nothing" Released: April 23, 2021

Singles from A Touch of the Beat Gets You Up on Your Feet Gets You Out and Then Into the Sun (Deluxe)
- 1. "Get Over Here" Released: September 10, 2021; 2. "Am I Alright" Released: October 22, 2021; 3. "Dead on the Beach" Released: January 14, 2022

A Touch of the Beat Gets You Up on Your Feet Gets You Out and Then Into the Sun is the fourth studio album by American duo Aly & AJ, released on May 7, 2021. The release marks their first studio album in 14 years, following Insomniatic in 2007. The album was produced by Yves Rothman, and each track holds writing credits from both Michalka sisters. Aly & AJ stated that despite the COVID-19 pandemic, it did not hinder their writing process, as they felt that they were "born to make" this album. They stated that while making the album, they were influenced by 1960s and 1970s music, and that it would differ from their two previous projects, Ten Years (2017) and Sanctuary (2019), which were influenced by 1980s music. The duo also wanted to capture the music of their home state California, and create a body of work that felt "timeless" to listeners. The result was a pop and pop rock record that draws musical influence from disco, soft rock, and country.

The album was recorded at Sunset Sound in California. The instrumentals for the album were also recorded at Sunset Sound using a live band, the members of which were tested for COVID-19 and wore masks whilst performing. After their 2007 song "Potential Breakup Song" gained traction on TikTok, the sisters wanted to use their online popularity to promote their new music, and brought the release of the album forward. They released the lead single, "Slow Dancing", in December 2020, a month prior to its scheduled release. The album was preceded by the release of four further singles; "Listen!!!", "Pretty Places", "Symptom of Your Touch", and "Don’t Need Nothing". The duo promoted the release of A Touch of the Beat Gets You Up on Your Feet Gets You Out and Then Into the Sun with a virtual concert on the day of its release. The album was released through Aly and AJ's own record label, and was distributed through Sony-owned distribution company AWAL. A deluxe edition of the album was released on February 11, 2022.

== Background and composition ==
Aly & AJ began conversations about making a studio album in early 2019, but "the record started to take shape" towards the end of that year. They recalled having numerous conversations about what the sound of the album would be like, and accredited album producer Yves Rothman with helping them to reach the sound they wanted. The response to the COVID-19 pandemic had an effect on the production process of making the album. However, Aly & AJ stated that despite the "world falling into the abyss", it did not affect their musical process, since they felt "it was the record we were always born to make".

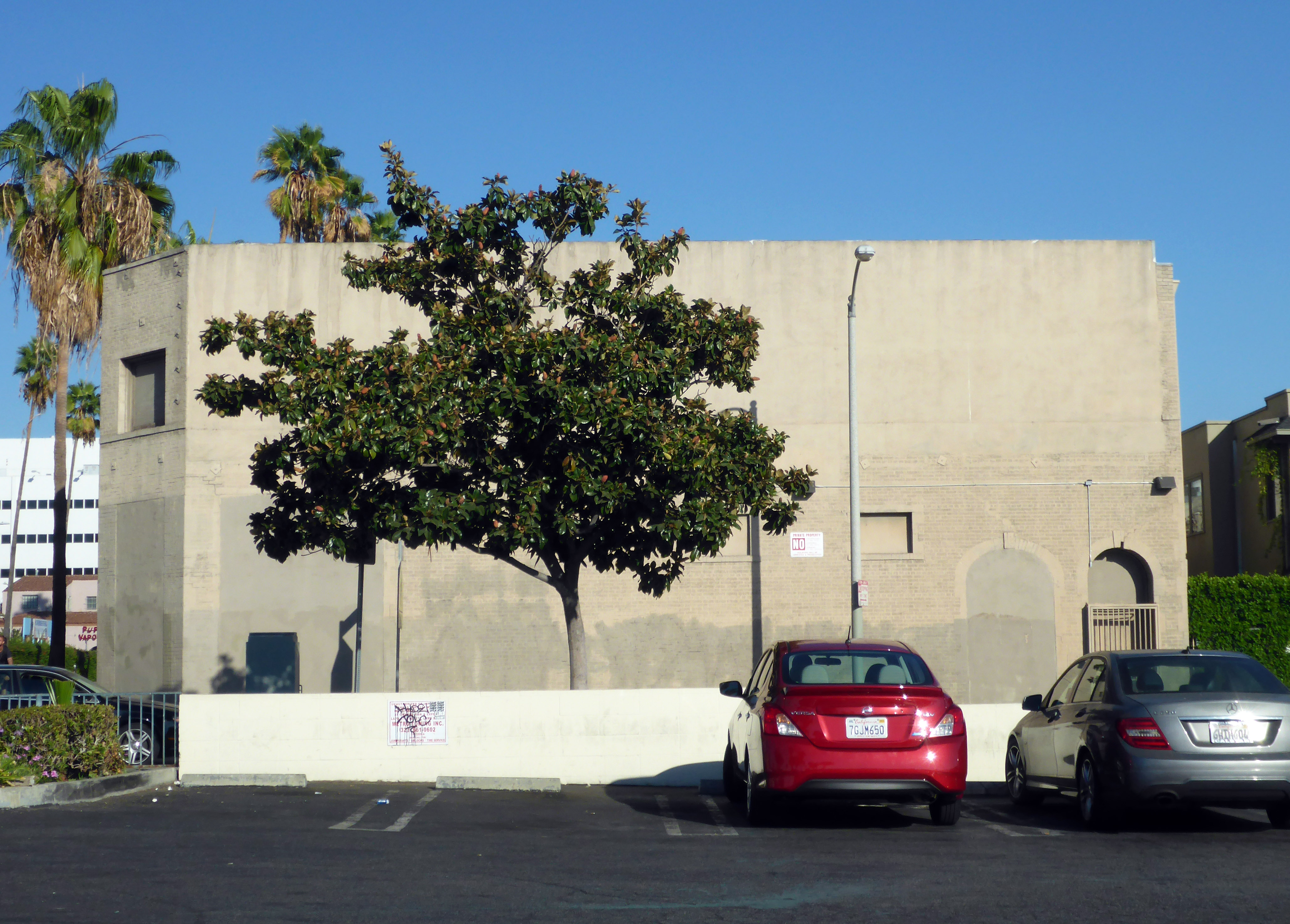
The duo recorded the entire album at Sunset Sound, as they liked how the studio made their vocals sound.

Aly stated that the lengthy title is a lyric from track "Don't Need Nothing", which they picked for the title in June 2020. Both sisters commented on the control that they felt whilst making the album. Aly stated that with previous albums, it was easier for them to be "derailed in terms of our taste or our opinion". However, she felt that with this album, the pair had become "more set in [their] ways", which they felt helped them with stylistic decisions. AJ echoed the comments, feeling that the music on the album showcased "a confidence to [their] music and [their] direction". The album was recorded with a full live band at the Sunset Sound studios in California, which the duo felt had brought a "human aspect" into the songs. The majority of the instrumentals were recorded within a week, with herself and sister AJ directing the musicians from behind glass. The live band were also tested for coronavirus, and wore masks during the recording process. Aly stated that they chose to record the album at Sunset Sound since she felt that the studios "make your voice sound angelic".

Aly stated that whilst writing for the album, they were not writing for radio or for anyone in particular. Instead, they felt that they were making music for themselves and for their fans. Aly & AJ told Bustle that A Touch of the Beat Gets You Up on Your Feet Gets You Out and Then Into the Sun would not be like their two extended plays (EPs), Ten Years (2017) and Sanctuary (2019). They explained that those two EPs were heavily influenced by 1980s electro-synth pop music, while this album was inspired by 1960s and 1970s rock, as well as the music of their state, California. AJ felt that whilst their previous EPs were great since they "really represented where [they] were at that time as musicians", they were going for a "timeless vibe" with this body of work. Aly & AJ wanted to write something similar to a classic record that makes listeners feel "suspended in time", and hoped that listeners would not be able to decipher the time period in which the album was made. They wanted to capture what they "associate with being California kids", and expressed their excitement to play the songs live. The sisters also hoped that the "really positive and hopeful outlook" of the songs would "make people get up on their feet and out and into life".

== Music and lyrics ==
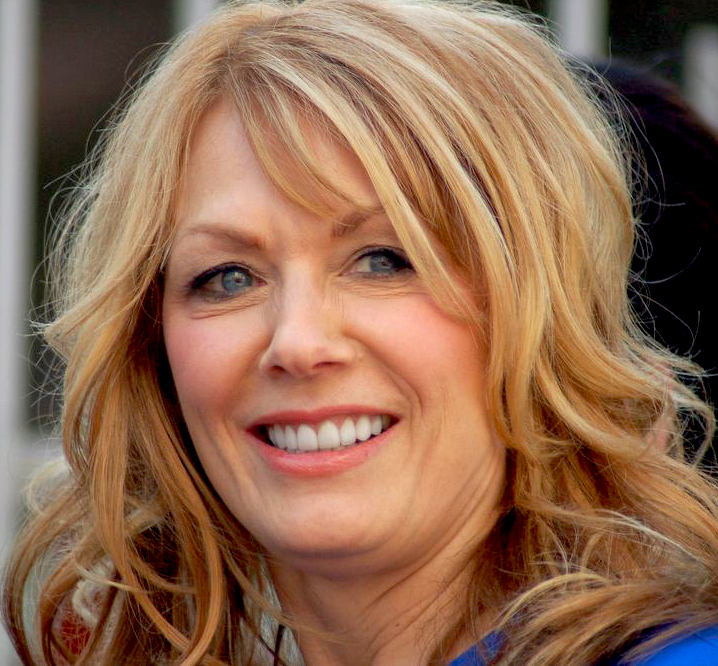
Heart member Nancy Wilson provided backing vocals and played guitar for "Listen!!!".

Musically, A Touch of the Beat Gets You Up on Your Feet Gets You Out and Then Into the Sun was described by music critics as a pop and pop rock record that contains influences of disco, soft rock, and country. The album begins with "Pretty Places", a "vintage" sounding song with a "unique, modern twist". The lyrical content of the song "embodies the feeling of driving down the Pacific Coast Highway on a dreamy evening, watching the sunset and sticking your head out the window to feel the warm air". The lyrical content of "Pretty Places" is based around wanting to travel following the lack of experiences during the pandemic, and appreciating the beauty of the world despite the "chaos". Soundigest wrote that the song "fully commits to the road trip theme" and "embodies a distinct feeling and aura", and that if the rest of the album is like "Pretty Places", it will be a "treat".

"Slow Dancing", the lead single from the project, is an "aching and stripped-down" song. The song is about longing for simplicity with their partner and wanting to dance with them. A lyric in the song, "I've never had this much time on my hands", is a reference to the period of isolation caused by the pandemic. With a "pristine, throwback synth production and an earworm hook", "Symptom of Your Touch" follows. Nylon wrote that the song is a reflection of the album as a whole. "Listen!!!", the second single from A Touch of the Beat Gets You Up on Your Feet Gets You Out and Then Into the Sun, has a "bombastic statement, rock backbone and timeless production". Aly & AJ stated that the song discusses the feeling of being trapped in a relationship or system. Aly added that the song is a reminder that "you might be lost but you always know your way out". The sisters worked with songwriter Jorge Elbrecht for "Listen!!!", which they described as a "breakthrough" for their songwriting experience, since they admired his work. Aly and AJ's long-term mentor Nancy Wilson provided background vocals and played guitar on the song since it caught her attention. "Don't Need Nothing" is a "twinkling and thumping" song that lends a lyric to the title of the album. Aly stated that once they had written the song, it acted as a "greenlight" for them to make an album with "Don't Need Nothing" on the track listing.

== Release ==
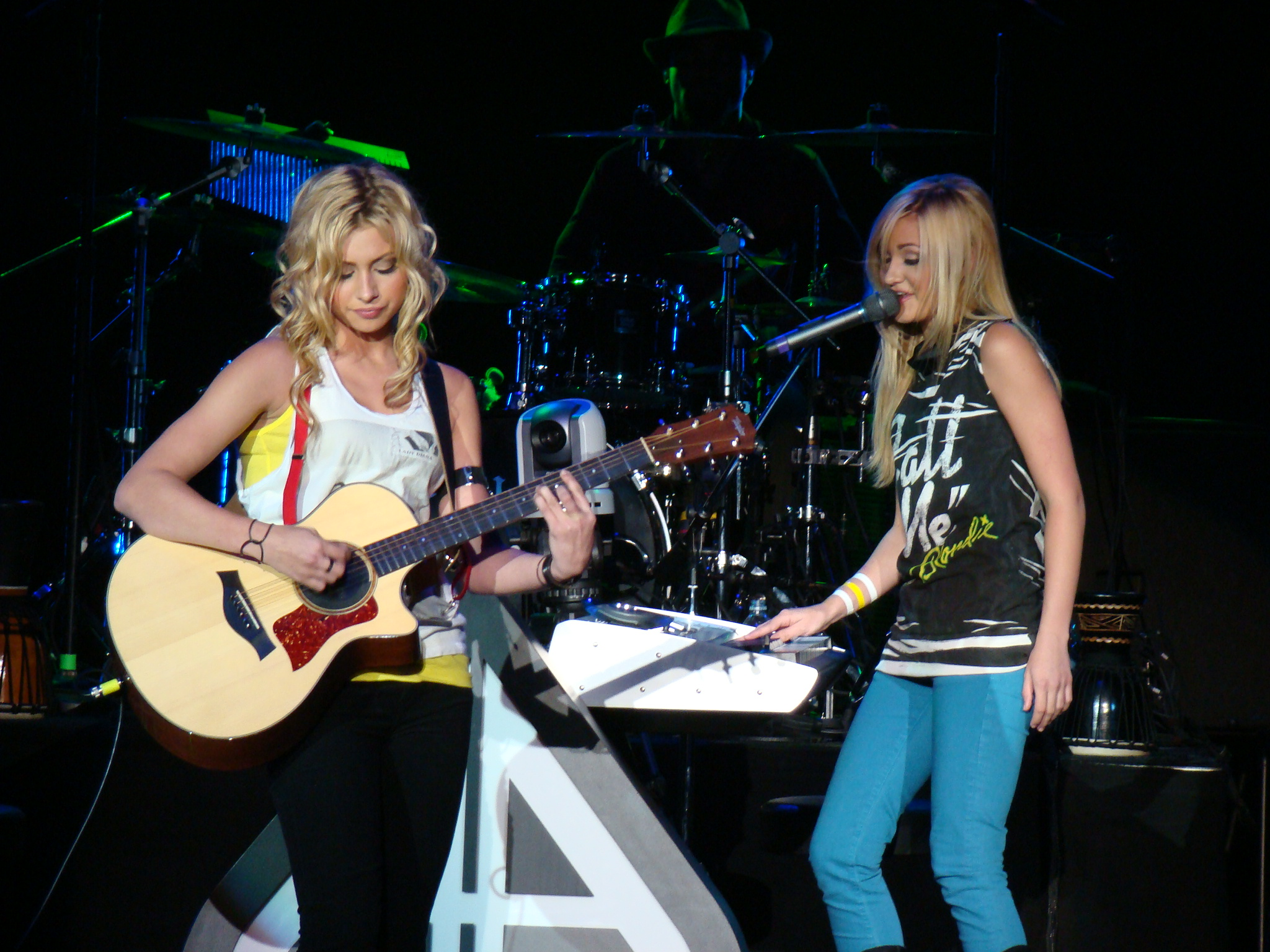
The album marks Aly & AJ's first studio album in over 14 years.

Following their 2007 song "Potential Breakup Song" gaining traction on the video-sharing social networking service TikTok in late 2020, Aly & AJ called their manager, Jared Rosenberg, to "strategize". Rosenberg expressed his gratitude that the album had been finished so that they could "proactively react" to the trend. As a result, the album's lead single, "Slow Dancing", was released on December 2, 2020, a month prior to its scheduled release, with its music video premiering on December 16. The duo confirmed that in the lead-up to the album release, they would be releasing a single each month. The song was quickly followed by the release of the album's second single, "Listen!!!", on January 15, 2021, with its music video being released two weeks later. With the release of "Listen!!!", it was announced that the duo would be releasing an album in spring 2021. It was also confirmed that details of the album would be announced soon after the third single.

On March 5, 2021, "Pretty Places" was released as the third single from A Touch of the Beat Gets You Up on Your Feet Gets You Out and Then Into the Sun, along with its accompanying music video. The duo described the song as their "favorite song [they had] ever written". Then on March 9, 2021, the album title and release date of May 7, 2021 was announced. Aly told People that since it had been 14 years since their last release, Insomniatic (2007), it felt like their first album release again. On April 9, 2021, "Symptom of Your Touch" was released as the album's fourth single. It was released as a digital download and a vinyl record. The single's music video was released on April 20, 2021. This was followed by the release of "Don't Need Nothing" as the album's fifth single on April 23, 2021 with its music video being released a week later on April 30. The album was released through Aly and AJ's own record label, and was distributed through Sony-owned distribution company AWAL. The album was promoted with a virtual concert the day of its release.

On September 8, 2021, the duo announced that a deluxe edition of A Touch of the Beat... would be released in early 2022. On the same day they released the lead single from the deluxe edition, "Get Over Here", a Garbage-inspired tune that was one of the first songs written for the album. They released the second single from the deluxe album, "Am I Alright", on October 24, 2021. "Dead on the Beach" was released as the third single from the deluxe edition on January 14, 2022.

== Critical reception ==
Professional ratings
Review scores
Source	Rating
AllMusic	4.5/5 stars
The Line of Best Fit	9/10
Tom Hull – on the Web	B+

A Touch of the Beat Gets You Up on Your Feet Gets You Out and Then Into the Sun was generally well-received by music critics upon its release. Reviewing the album for AllMusic, Tim Sendra concluded that, "Aly & AJ are totally in charge here and doing their own thing quite well. Not many artists make as much out of their second chance as the sisters do, and hopefully their excellent album will find the audience it deserves."

Billboard included the album on their list of the best albums of the first half of 2021, calling it "a well-balanced album that tells a beautiful story of hopeful reemergence". The album was placed at number 35 in The Guardian's list of the 50 best albums of 2021, with Laura Snapes describing it as a "dreamy collection of west coast pop-rock, a vision of Robyn-gone-Laurel Canyon".

== Track listing ==
All tracks are written by AJ Michalka and Aly Michalka, with additional co-writers as noted; except "Dead on the Beach," written by AJ Michalka and Josh Pence.

No.	Title	Writer(s)	Length
1.	"Pretty Places"	Jamie Sierota; Yves Rothman	5:19
2.	"Lost Cause"	Sierota; Rothman	3:15
3.	"Break Yourself"		3:17
4.	"Slow Dancing"	Jeremiah Raisen; Rothman; Ryan Spraker	4:27
5.	"Paradise"		4:44
6.	"Symptom of Your Touch"	Jorge Elbrecht; Raisen; Rothman	3:15
7.	"Lucky to Get Him"	Elbrecht; Raisen; Rothman	4:21
8.	"Listen!!!"	Elbrecht	3:50
9.	"Don't Need Nothing"	Elbrecht	3:23
10.	"Stomach"	Olen Kittelson; Raisen; Stephen Ringer; Rothman	3:15
11.	"Personal Cathedrals"	Johnny Newman; Ringer; Rothman	3:46
12.	"Hold Out"	Newman; Rothman	4:05
Total length:			46:56

Deluxe edition bonus tracks
No.	Title	Writer(s)	Length
13.	"Dead on the Beach"		3:02
14.	"Get Over Here"	Rothman	3:55
15.	"Am I Alright"	Allie Crystal; Larzz Principato	3:34
16.	"Way Way Back"	Ringer; Rothman; Spraker	3:57
Total length:			61:24

== Personnel ==
Adapted from the credits on Aly & AJ's official YouTube channel.

=== Musicians ===
- Aly Michalka – vocals
- AJ Michalka – vocals, percussion (2)
- Yves Rothman – Roland Juno-60 (1, 2, 5–7, 9–11), Minimoog (1, 2, 4, 8), Mellotron (1–4, 12), electric guitars (1, 2), Roland TR-505 (1–4), drum programming (1–3, 5–11), drums (2), synth bass (5–7, 10, 11), Ensoniq ASR-10 (8), percussion (10), programming (12)
- Benjamin Zelico – Wurlitzer electric piano (1, 3–7, 9), electric guitars (1), percussion (1–3, 10, 11), Yamaha DX7 (2), drums (2, 10, 11), acoustic piano (3, 5–7, 9, 11), guitars (4–7, 10), programming (7, 12), Roland Juno-106 (8)
- Joe Kennedy – acoustic piano (2), analog synthesizers (2, 5, 6, 9–12), guitars (2, 5, 6, 8–12)
- Jorge Elbrecht – synthesizers (3, 5, 6, 9), programming (8)
- Stewart Bronaugh – organ (4), slide guitar (4), cello (4)
- Jack Tatum – synthesizers (8), guitars (8), backing vocals (8)
- Sam Stewart – acoustic guitars (1, 2), baritone guitar (1, 2), 12-string guitar (1, 2), guitars (7, 11)
- Amir Yaghmai – electric guitars (3, 5, 8, 9, 12)
- Nancy Wilson – guitar (8), backing vocals (8)
- Melissa Etheridge – guitar (12)
- Thomas Drayton – bass (1, 2, 8, 10, 11)
- Jake Bercovici – bass (3–5, 9, 12)
- James McAlister – drums (1, 3–6, 8, 9, 12), percussion (4), drum programming (4–6, 9)
- Sylvain Carton – saxophone (3, 4)
- Derek Stein – cello (5, 6, 12)
- Linnea Powell – viola (5, 6)
- Adrianne Pope – violin (5, 6)
- Mona Tian – violin (5, 6)

=== Production ===
- Yves Rothman – producer, engineer, mixing (1, 2, 4, 7–12), editing (3, 5–7, 9–12)
- Benjamin Zelico – additional production (1, 2, 7, 10, 11)
- Ainjel Emme – vocal production
- Jesse Lee Newport – engineer, mixing (4, 8)
- Adam Hawkins – mixing (3)
- Michael Ilbert – mixing (5, 6)
- Nate Haessly – assistant engineer (1, 3–6, 8, 9, 12)
- Chris Allgood – mastering
- Emily Lazar – mastering
- The Lodge (New York, NY) – mastering location
- Susanna Howe – creative director
- Jimmy Turrell – artwork
- The Collective Works – design
- Stephen Ringer – photography
- Amanda Charchian – back cover photography
- Jared Rosenberg – management

== Charts ==
Chart performance for A Touch of the Beat Gets You Up on Your Feet Gets You Out and Then Into the Sun
Chart (2021)	Peak position
UK Album Downloads (OCC)	40
US Top Current Album Sales (Billboard)	96

== Release history ==
Release history for A Touch of the Beat Gets You Up on Your Feet Gets You Out and Then Into the Sun
Region	Date	Format	Version	Ref.
Various	May 7, 2021	digital download; streaming	Standard	
Various	July 9, 2021	CD	Standard	
Various	November 1, 2021	LP	Standard	
Various	February 11, 2022	LP; digital download; streaming	Deluxe	
