= Take Me (Aly & AJ song) =

Single by Aly & AJ

from the album Ten Years
- Released: August 18, 2017
- Genre: Synth-pop; alternative pop
- Length: 3:32
- Label: Aly & AJ Music
- Songwriter(s): Aly Michalka; AJ Michalka; Jamie Sierota; Ryan Spraker
- Producer(s): Ryan Spraker - Jamie Sierota

Aly & AJ singles chronology
"Hothouse" (2013)	"Take Me" (2017)	"I Know" (2017)

"Take Me" is a song recorded by American music duo Aly & AJ. It was released on August 18, 2017 as the lead single from the duo's debut EP Ten Years (2017). It serves as their first release since their name change from 78Violet to Aly & AJ, as well as their first release as Aly & AJ in ten years. The single was silently released on June 2, 2017, but was taken down quickly after. "Take Me" was penned by the duo, along with Jamie Sierota and Ryan Spraker.

== Background ==
Aly & AJ released three studio albums under Hollywood Records, the most recent being Insomniatic (2007), which peaked at number 15 on the Billboard 200, and contained single "Potential Breakup Song", which reached number 17 on the Billboard Hot 100. The duo left the label in 2010, and began releasing music under 78violet. They released the single "Hothouse" in 2013, before returning to the name Aly & AJ. Despite this, the two were tired by the music business and subsequently stuck to acting. Aly currently plays Peyton Charles on iZombie, while AJ plays Lainey Lewis on The Goldbergs. In April 2016, the duo began recording music again, writing with Mike Elizondo and Ryan Spraker. In April 2017, the duo confirmed new music was on the way.

== Composition ==
"Take Me" is a 1980s-inspired synth-pop and alternative pop song with a length of three minutes and thirty two seconds. The single's instrumentation consists of synthesizers, vintage vocal processing and electronic drum kits. The song lyrically is about wanting a crush to make a move, and the nerves that come with it.

Aly spoke about the song to Elite Daily

"It's cheeky ... no pun intended. It encompasses, I think the song and what it stands for and strong, female empowerment. And it's very west coast, like this is us. We are west coast girls, we've grown up in California and that's very much our music."

— Aly Michalka, interview with Elite Daily

== Critical reception ==
John Tucker of The Indie Sound gave the single a positive review, writing that the duo "have successfully found a way to rebrand their sound without losing their signature name." Tucker additionally wrote that the single could "guarantee them a spot in today’s ever-so changing market." Kristin Rohwedder writing for Bustle magazine also praised the song, writing that it holds up to the duo's older singles such as "Potential Breakup Song" and "Chemicals React". Bradley Stern of MuuMuse wrote that the single "sounds fresh and nostalgic all at once, fitting into today’s indie-pop soundscape pretty seamlessly."

== Music video ==
The music video for "Take Me" was released on September 14, 2017, and was directed by Alex Ross Perry, with Sean Price Williams handling the video's cinematography. It additionally contains cameo appearances from Amanda Crew, Madeline Zima, and Josh Pence. The vampire-themed video takes place in the streets of Los Angeles, with each of the guest actors falling prey to the duo's blood lust. The video was shot on 16mm film.

== Track listing ==
Digital download
No.	Title	Length
1.	"Take Me"	3:32

Matthew Dear Remix
No.	Title	Length
1.	"Take Me" (Matthew Dear Remix)	3:14

== Personnel ==
- Aly Michalka – vocals, songwriting
- AJ Michalka – vocals, songwriting
- Jamie Sierota – songwriting
- Ryan Spraker – songwriting, production

== Charts ==
Chart (2017)	Peak pos.
US Digital Songs (Billboard)	107

== Release history ==
Region	Release date	Format	Ref.
Various	August 18, 2017	Digital download	
