= Slow Dancing (Aly & AJ song) =

Single by Aly & AJ

from the album A Touch of the Beat Gets You Up on Your Feet Gets You Out and Then Into the Sun
- Released: December 2, 2020
- Studio: Sunset Sound Recorders (Los Angeles)
- Genre: Pop; rock; indie folk
- Length: 4:27
- Label: AWAL
- Songwriters: Amanda Joy Michalka; Alyson Michalka; Jeremiah Raisen; Ryan Spraker; Yves Rothman
- Producer: Rothman

Aly & AJ singles chronology
"Joan of Arc on the Dance Floor" (2020)	"Slow Dancing" (2020)	"Potential Breakup Song (Explicit)" (2020)

"Slow Dancing" is a song by American pop duo Aly & AJ from their fourth studio album, A Touch of the Beat Gets You Up on Your Feet Gets You Out and Then Into the Sun (2021). Band members AJ and Aly Michalka co-wrote the song with Jeremiah Raisen, Ryan Spraker, and Yves Rothman, with Rothman also handling the production. It was originally envisioned as an up-tempo synth-pop song similar to Aly & AJ's 2017–2019 material, several years before the album was conceived. The duo re-wrote it as a romantic ballad upon revisiting the song while quarantining during COVID-19, updating the lyrics to reflect the impact of the pandemic at the behest of Rothman. Aly initially disliked the song but eventually grew to appreciate it. One of the last songs completed for the album, the song was originally scheduled for a January 2021 release, but Aly & AJ decided to release it a month earlier because they found the soft, calming nature suitable for winter.

Inspired by 1960s music, "Slow Dancing" is a country-influenced pop, rock, and indie folk ballad that prominently features guitar and drum instrumentation throughout its production. The song's lyrics are about learning to appreciate life's mundane aspects while longing for the presence of a loved one. Released by Aly & AJ Music/AWAL as the album's lead single on December 2, 2020, the song received positive reviews from critics, who complimented Aly & AJ's artistic maturity and songwriting. Several commentators cited its themes about loneliness, isolation, and longing as particularly relevant to the state of the world at the time.

A music video for the song directed by Aly's husband Stephen Ringer was released on December 16, 2020, which Aly & AJ filmed on their mother's ranch in Santa Ynez, California during lockdown. The video emphasizes the song's theme about loneliness, alternating between scenes of AJ dancing with and without her love interest, played by boyfriend Josh Pence. Aly & AJ have performed the song live on several occasions, including on Good Morning America, and throughout their A Touch of the Beat Tour, beginning in 2022.

== Writing and recording ==
"Slow Dancing" was co-written by Aly & AJ band members AJ and Aly Michalka with Jeremiah Raisen, Ryan Spraker, and Yves Rothman, while Rothman also produced the track. Crediting AJ as its main songwriter, Aly was not particularly fond of the song initially, but eventually grew to enjoy and understand it over time. "Slow Dancing" was originally envisioned as an up-tempo synth and dance-pop song inspired by 1980s music (similar to the band's 2017–2019 releases), before evolving into a subtler romantic ballad. They began writing its melody roughly four to five years before the rest of the album, but they did not complete the lyrics until quarantining during the COVID-19 pandemic, with the Los Angeles lockdown inspiring them to update the subject matter and themes for current events. AJ admitted that some lyrical and storytelling aspects might not have developed without the pandemic's impact, describing "Slow Dancing" as their special "quarantine love song". Aly agreed that the overall longing theme of "Slow Dancing" resonates more deeply after spending over a year in isolation, during which the duo revised the song daily until they felt its lyrics had been perfected.

Upon hearing the song for the first time, Rothman agreed that Aly & AJ should emphasize its quarantining and social distancing theme without being too "on the nose" about the topic, to the point where listeners would not envision anything apart from the pandemic. Recorded at Sunset Sound Recorders in Los Angeles during lockdown, "Slow Dancing" was one of the last songs completed for A Touch of the Beat Gets You Up on Your Feet Gets You Out and Then Into the Sun. Aly & AJ identified recording "Slow Dancing" with live musicians as one of their favorite moments from creating the album. Musicians who performed on the track include Sylvain Carton on saxophone; Ben Zelico on Wurlitzer electronic piano and guitar; Jake Bercovici on bass; Amir Yaghami on guitar; Stewart Bronaugh on slide guitar, cello, and organ; and James McAlister on drums. The song's outro, which Aly & AJ had not composed for its original demo, was improvised by the band during the recording session. Both Rothman and the singers described "Slow Dancing" as the kind of music they had always been meant to create, reminding the sisters of summer nights spent with their father in Laguna Beach as children.

== Release ==
"Slow Dancing" was released as the first single from Aly & AJ's seventh studio album A Touch of the Beat Gets You Up on Your Feet Gets You Out and Then Into the Sun (2021) on December 2, 2020. It was the first in a series of singles Aly & AJ had planned on releasing monthly preceding the album, which was their first full-length album in 14 years. "Slow Dancing" was also their third single of 2020, following "Attack of Panic" and "Joan of Arc on the Dance Floor". Originally slated for a January 2021 release, the date was brought forward one month by the duo's manager Jared Rosenberg due to positive social media response towards an explicit re-recording of their signature song "Potential Breakup Song", which was originally released in 2007. Premiering on the social media platform TikTok, the "Potential Breakup Song" video included an a capella intro of "Slow Dancing". However, AJ argued that TikTok exposure had little to do with expediting its release, instead asserting the duo decided to release the single in December because "it feels like one of those songs that you could listen to by the fire with a cup of tea on a nice cozy couch with a blanket wrapped around you, like the song feels like a hug". They found "Slow Dancing" suitable for a fall-winter season release without pigeonholing it as a Christmas song.

According to Aly, "Slow Dancing" was selected as the album's lead single to allow listeners an opportunity to "ease" into the duo's new sound, and she hoped the song would encourage fans to slow-dance in their living rooms. Despite differing sonically from most of their musical output at the time, AJ insisted they were not deliberately trying to release a single that sounds "left of center", but simply felt "Slow Dancing" had the most potential to resonate among their fans. The duo credited fans' response to "Slow Dancing" with "giv[ing] us this wonderful confidence to continue to make the kind of music we want to make, our way". To commemorate the single's one-year anniversary, Aly & AJ released an extended play (EP) featuring four different remixes of the song by four different artists: the Overcoats, Hazel English, James McAlister, and the She-J on December 24, 2021.

== Music and lyrics ==
Inspired by 1960s and 1970s music, "Slow Dancing" is an acoustic, mid-tempo pop, rock and indie folk ballad, with country music influences and minimal, "stripped-down" production. Billboard's Lindsey Havens labeled it "contemplative, California-rooted rock". Lasting four minutes and twenty-seven seconds, AJ described its production as "warm and inviting". AJ performs lead vocals, with her and Aly trading "hushed", "dreamy" harmonies that emphasize the romance of slow dancing with a significant other. Justin Moran of Paper noticed that "Slow Dancing" is remarkably "softer" than the duo's two previous electropop singles, "Attack of Panic" and "Joan of Arc on the Dance Floor", both released in 2020, although the ballad retains some synth-pop traits. As one of the album's slower tracks, Gabriel Aikins of MTV Australia observed that Aly & AJ's pop origins are replaced with intimate guitars. Featuring relaxed guitars, gentle drumming, soft percussion, a steady bassline, and calming lyrics, "Slow Dancing" begins simply with a guitar riff layered underneath their "dreamy" vocals. The second half of the song features "more robust" production, with additional instrumentation including organ, cello, and saxophone. Music critic Thomas Bleach cited influences of doo-wop as the song steadily builds towards a guitar solo. Certain critics have likened "Slow Dancing" to the work of country singer Patsy Cline, rock band Fleetwood Mac, and pop singer Taylor Swift.

Nostalgia is a common theme among A Touch of the Beat Gets You Up on Your Feet Gets You Out and Then Into the Sun's songs, which is particularly prevalent on "Slow Dancing". Lyrically, "Slow Dancing" is about the duo's desire to return to simpler, quieter times, yearning for a loved one after an extended period of solitude. Described by Idolator's Mike Wass as a "mellow anthem", its lyrics begin "It’s been days and weeks and months, feels like forever since I saw you ... I’m forgetting how you felt now". Reflecting on a period of isolation, they sing "I've never had this much time on my hands" quietly, before opening the chorus admitting "I don't need anything fancy/ I just need me and you slow dancing." The chorus concludes, "Hell's bending, keeping me captive/ Heaven's here, it's right where you're standing". The song's pre-chorus is repeated "Move the kitchen table out to the lawn / Roll up the rug the stereo's on / All I can imagine is being in your arms”, reminding listeners to cherish romance whenever possible, particularly when forced to separate. Bustle contributor Jack Irvin observed that "Slow Dancing" starkly contrasts with the aggressive breakup message of "Potential Breakup Song", writing that the former "takes you out of breakup territory and into the pure bliss of new love through lyrics that imagine a perfectly simple evening complete with a romantic at-home dance with a lover". According to Moran, "Slow Dancing" is an "earnest ballad about being in someone's arms".

Several music commentators found the song's themes about loneliness and isolation to be particularly topical amidst COVID-19 social distancing, with the staff of Forty5 Presents dubbing it a "stay-at-home waltz". Bleach summarized the ballad as "a love letter to someone while being separated from them in the middle of the COVID-19 pandemic", which the duo uses to "confess their undying love". Giselle Libby of Soundigest described "Slow Dancing" as "a soothing love song that incorporates the beauty, fear and yearning that has affected everyone during the pandemic". In addition to referencing the pandemic, Melodic magazine's Marisa Graham noticed lyrical allusions to several worldly conflicts, writing that the song ultimately "serves as a glimmer amidst that feeling and reminds you that there were times worth remembering before, and there will be again", while Elly Belle of Bitch offered that the ballad "explores a bittersweet discovery of what truly matters—the simple things". Alternative Press's Augusta Battoclette observed that, compared to other songs on the album, the single offers a more positive outlook on love via lyrics that explain "they don't need any over-the-top displays of affection to stay in love". Ineye Komonibo of Refinery29 remarked that, if anything, the song teaches "how to find peace in the stillness" and "relish in the mundane, everyday moments".

== Reception ==
"Slow Dancing" was highly acclaimed by music critics and fans upon release. Most reviewers praised the song's quality, with Atwood Magazine's Nicole Almeida calling it "divine", and Mike Wass of Idolator describing its chorus as "lovely". Haven called it a "gem". In a track-by-track review of A Touch of the Beat Gets You Up on Your Feet Gets You Out and Then Into the Sun, Rebecca Breitfeller of Young Hollywood said the duo "did not miss the mark with this being the first sound of the album", appreciating the juxtaposition of the lyrical weight against soothing, laid-back production. K.B. Denis of The Bulletin called "Slow Dancing" the album's finest track, highlighting its "outstanding" lyrics. WKNC-FM highlighted the song as one of the three best tracks on A Touch of the Beat Gets You Up on Your Feet Gets You Out and Then Into the Sun.

Several critics complimented the song's mature sound in comparison to Aly & AJ's previous material. Reviewing "Slow Dancing" as a lead single, Bleach felt it demonstrates the band's artistic growth and experimentation perfectly, suggesting that listeners "check if your heart is actually still inside your body" if they find themselves unmoved by the song. Maia Kedem of Audacy was grateful to "Slow Dancing" for "hold[ing] us over" while awaiting new music from Aly & AJ. Similar to Beach, other critics noted the song's potential to make listeners feel strong emotions. Writing for Alternative Press, Battoclette likened "Slow Dancing" to "a comforting hug on a warm summer night", whereas Sweety High's Taylor Augustin said the ballad "will make you want to draw the blinds, light some candles and maybe even cry".

Komonibo of Refinery29 included the song on their year-end "New Music To Know" listicle for 2020. "Slow Dancing" has established itself as a favorite among Aly & AJ's fans since its release, accumulating 14 million streams by April 2022.

== Music video ==
Aly & AJ released a music video to promote the single on December 16, 2020. The duo wanted to convey "the story of two lovers separated from each other during an unprecedented time". Directed, edited, and produced by Aly's husband Stephen Ringer, the video was filmed during quarantine on their mother's ranch in Santa Ynez, California. The sisters credited COVID-19 restrictions and social distancing with forcing them to be more creative and "think outside the box" in order to film the video, styling their own hair and makeup for the project, and borrowing their mother's truck and horse. Opting to film using a Steadicam operator, which in turn distinguished the project from previous videos, they shot the majority of the video in one continuous take, with their producer contributing via Zoom. Actors Josh Pence, who is AJ's boyfriend, and James Sharkey also appear in the video. According to Moran, the music video reinforces the song's themes about loneliness and companionship, alternating between the two.

The video begins with AJ taking a final sip from her glass of red wine, after which the scene alternates between memories of her slow dancing with and without her partner. Meanwhile, Aly walks with her horse, and the two eventually travel to a saloon on the back of a pickup truck as the song's tempo increases. Inspired by the sisters' West Coast upbringing, the video shares a desert motif and aesthetic with other songs from the album.

== Live performances ==
During live performances and band rehearsals, Aly typically plays the tambourine and AJ plays the acoustic guitar, although some performances feature both singers on the latter. Towards the end of 2020, Aly & AJ performed the song during TikTok's virtual New Year's Eve celebration. In March 2021, Aly & AJ sang the song during a virtual live performance and Q&A for Hamilton College. That same month, they virtually performed "Slow Dancing" for Winona State University, with the song being specifically requested by audience members. The duo performed "Slow Dancing" at the Lollapalooza music festival in July 2021. In January 2022, they performed "Slow Dancing" on Good Morning America, which the morning talk show described as "a special performance". In March 2022, Aly & AJ performed "Slow Dancing" live at Ohio University's Throwback Thursday Concert, during which most of the crowd turned on their phone's flashlight feature while waving them back and forth.

Starting in 2022, the duo performed the song during their A Touch of the Beat Tour in support of the album. Aly & AJ identified "Slow Dancing" as the catalyst that encouraged them to embark on a proper tour.

== Credits and personnel ==
Credits adapted from Jaxsta:

- AJ Michalka – vocals, songwriter
- Aly Michalka – vocals, songwriter
- Jeremiah Raisen – songwriter
- Ryan Spraker – songwriter
- Yves Rothman – songwriter, producer
