= More Silver =

2025 EP by Aly & AJ

EP by Aly & AJ
- Released: September 19, 2025
- Length: 16:33
- Label: Aly & AJ Music
- Producer: Jonathan Wilson; James McAlister

Aly & AJ chronology
| Silver Deliverer (2025) | More Silver (2025) |

More Silver is the fourth extended play (EP) by American duo Aly & AJ, which was released on September 19, 2025. The EP consists of songs recorded for the album Silver Deliverer that were not included on the album.

== Track listing ==
All tracks are written by Aly Michalka, AJ Michalka, Connor Sullivan and Ben Zelico, except where noted.

| No. | Title | Writer(s) | Length |
|---|---|---|---|
| 1. | "The Last Town" | | 4:13 |
| 2. | "Out of My Feelings" | | 3:53 |
| 3. | "The Deep End" | Aly Michalka; AJ Michalka; James McAlister | 3:58 |
| 4. | "Strawberry Wine" (Deana Carter cover) | Matraca Berg; Gary Harrison | 4:29 |
| Total length: | | | 16:33 |
