= I Know (Aly & AJ song) =

Single by Aly & AJ

from the album Ten Years
- Released: November 3, 2017
- Genre: Dance-pop; dream pop; indie pop
- Length: 3:30
- Label: Aly & AJ LLC
- Songwriters: Aly Michalka; AJ Michalka; Jamie Sierota; Ryan Spraker; Tom Peyton
- Producers: Jamie Sierota; Ryan Spraker

Aly & AJ singles chronology
"Take Me" (2017)	"I Know" (2017)	"Good Love" (2018)

"I Know" is a single recorded by American pop duo Aly & AJ. The follow-up to their previous single "Take Me", it was released on November 3, 2017 as the second single from their debut extended play, Ten Years (2017).

== Composition ==
"I Know" continues the electronic music experimentation found in their previous single "Take Me". It is a dance-pop, dream pop song that has a length of three minutes and thirty seconds. The song is in the key of F minor and moves at a tempo of 115 beats per minute in a 4/4 time signature. The song was musically compared to the works of M83.

The duo stated the song was inspired by the death of an acquaintance from cancer:

"This song was written a few days after we found out an acquaintance from our past had lost his battle with cancer. After seeing such an outcry of love and support from his close friends and family we decided to write something dedicated to friendship and the commitment we are all capable of giving when someone needs us most."

— Aly & AJ, MTV

== Critical reception ==
Allison Stubblebine, writing for Billboard, praised the duo for "[learning] to hit the metaphorical nail on the head of pop, grasping the perfect balance of dreamy retro-vibes with powerful vocals."

== Track listing ==
Taken from Tidal.

No.	Title	Length
1.	"I Know"	3:30

== Release history ==
Region	Release date	Format	Ref.
Various	November 3, 2017	Digital download	
