= Ten Years (EP) =

2017 EP by Aly & AJ

EP by Aly & AJ
- Released: 17 November 2017
- Recorded: September 2017
- Genre: Synth-pop
- Length: 15:11
- Label: Aly & AJ LLC
- Producer: Jamie Sierota; Ryan Spraker

Aly & AJ chronology
Insomniatic (2007)	Ten Years (2017)	Sanctuary (2019)

Singles from Ten Years
- 1. "Take Me" Released: August 18, 2017; 2. "I Know" Released: November 3, 2017

Ten Years (Deluxe reissue)

Singles from Ten Years (Deluxe reissue)
- 1. "Good Love" Released: June 15, 2018

Ten Years is the first extended play (EP) by American pop duo Aly & AJ. It was released on November 17, 2017, and Ten Years marks their first release in ten years, following their third studio album, Insomniatic (2007), which peaked at number 15 on the Billboard 200. It is also their first release since leaving Hollywood Records in 2010; the record was released on their own label, Aly & AJ Music, LLC.

Departing from their previous commercial pop rock sound, Ten Years features a 1980s-inspired musical composition incorporating echoed vocals, an 808-inspired drum machine, and synth pads. The EP was preceded by the release of two singles: "Take Me" and "I Know". Ten Years received positive reviews from music critics, who praised the blend of 1980s-inspired music and modern production, as well as the duo's songwriting. The album peaked at #25 on the US Independent Albums chart. The EP was further promoted by the Promises Tour, which the duo undertook through July 2018.

A deluxe version of Ten Years was released on November 30, 2018, and included the release of the single "Good Love".

== Background ==
Aly & AJ released three studio albums under Hollywood Records: Into the Rush (2005), Acoustic Hearts of Winter (2006), and Insomniatic (2007). The latter peaked at number 15 on the Billboard 200, and contained the single "Potential Breakup Song", which reached number 17 on the Billboard Hot 100. After leaving the label in 2010, they began releasing music under 78violet, releasing the single "Hothouse" in 2013, before returning to the name Aly & AJ. Subsequently becoming tired of the music business, the two focused on acting. Aly currently plays Peyton Charles on iZombie, while AJ plays Lainey Lewis on The Goldbergs. In April 2016, the duo resumed recording music, writing with Mike Elizondo and Ryan Spraker. In April 2017, they confirmed that new music was forthcoming.

== Composition ==
Ten Years is a synth-pop EP with a nostalgic-tinged, synth-driven sound. The EP opens with lead single "Take Me", a "shimmery" synth-pop song featuring a bombastic, flirtatious chorus. The single's instrumentation consists of synthesizers, vintage vocal processing, and electronic drum kits, while its lyrics address the anxiety of making a move on a crush. The second track, "I Know", is a dreamy dance-pop song inspired by the death of an acquaintance from cancer. It features a fluttering backbeat, distorted echoes, and simplistic verses, and has been musically compared to the works of M83.

"Promises" explores the realization of a cheating partner in a confessional and nocturnal manner. The duo described it as the only song on the EP "more on the fictional side." Originally not intended for inclusion on the EP, "Promises" was added at the last minute. Musically, it incorporates a propulsive beat. The EP's closer, "The Distance", is a bittersweet reflection offering a wistful remembrance.

== Promotion ==
=== Singles ===
"Take Me" was announced as the lead single on June 2, 2017. The single was quietly released the same day, but was quickly taken down. The single was noted for a change in the group's musical style, trading their commercial pop rock for 1980s-inspired synth-pop. The single received positive reviews from critics, and a vampire-themed music video was released on September 14, 2017. "I Know" was released as the second single from the EP on November 3, 2017. The single was inspired by the death of an acquaintance from cancer.

"Good Love" was released as the third single from the EP on June 15, 2018, and was included on the deluxe version of the EP.

=== Tour ===
The duo embarked on the Promises Tour to promote Ten Years from June 3 to July 6, 2018.

== Critical reception ==
Liz Cantrell of Spin described the album as "a sinuous, slinky comeback, weaving an 80s synth sensibility with contemporary beats," and "a promising turn for the Michalka sisters." Justin Moran of Out called the EP "triumphant," while Sam Damshenas of Gay Times called it "synthpop perfection."

== Track listing ==
All tracks are written by Aly Michalka, AJ Michalka, Jamie Sierota and Ryan Spraker; with "I Know" co-written by Tom Peyton. All tracks are produced by Jamie Sierota, with additional production by Ryan Spraker on tracks 1–3 and 5–8.

No.	Title	Length
1.	"Take Me"	3:31
2.	"I Know"	3:30
3.	"Promises"	4:12
4.	"The Distance"	3:58
Total length:		15:11

Deluxe version
No.	Title	Length
5.	"Good Love"	4:13
6.	"With You"	4:59
7.	"Promises" (Live at Thalia Hall)	5:07
8.	"Take Me" (Live at Thalia Hall)	4:23
Total length:		33:53

== Charts ==
Chart (2017)	Peak position
US Independent Albums (Billboard)	25

== Release history ==
List of regions, release dates, showing formats, labels and references
Region	Date	Label	Format	Version	Ref.
Worldwide	November 17, 2017	Aly & AJ LLC	Digital download	Standard	
Worldwide	June 15, 2018	Aly & AJ LLC	Vinyl	Standard	
Worldwide	August 30, 2018	Aly & AJ LLC	CD	Standard	
Worldwide	November 30, 2018	Aly & AJ LLC	Digital download	Deluxe	
Worldwide	November 25, 2020	Aly & AJ LLC	Vinyl	Deluxe	
