= Silver Deliverer =

Studio album by Aly & AJ
- Released: May 2, 2025
- Genre: Rock; folk; country
- Length: 49:15
- Label: Aly & AJ Music
- Producer: Jonathan Wilson; James McAlister

Aly & AJ chronology
Lonesome Dove (2023)	Silver Deliverer (2025)	More Silver (2025)

Singles from Silver Deliverer
- 1. "Sirens" Released: September 12, 2024; 2. "What It Feels Like" Released: January 10, 2025; 3. "Next to Nothing" Released: April 4, 2025; 4. "If You Get Lonely" Released: April 18, 2025; 5. "Dandelions" Released: April 22, 2025

Silver Deliverer is the sixth studio album by American duo Aly & AJ, which was released on May 2, 2025.

== Composition ==
After the success of their album, A Touch of the Beat Gets You Up on Your Feet Gets You Out and Then Into the Sun, in 2021, the sisters began work on their subsequent album. In interviews, the sisters described the album as a Laurel Canyon-inspired sound that reconnected with their younger creative instincts. AJ Michalka stated that the album “feels like we’re almost leaning back into the child-like wonder we had when we started,” while Aly Michalka explained that the record represents a shift away from their childhood identity and toward a more mature perspective as songwriters. It was also written while Aly was pregnant with her son.

The sisters announced their lead single, "What It Feels Like," would be dropping on January 10, 2025. They announced the album in April 2025. Opry described the album as a blend of "sun-drenched California rock" and "country-tinged folk".

== Track listing ==
All tracks are written by Aly Michalka, AJ Michalka, Drew Erickson, and Jonathan Wilson, except where noted. All tracks are produced by Jonathan Wilson, with co-production by James McAlister on tracks 3, 6, and 9.

No.	Title	Writer(s)	Length
1.	"Silver Deliverer"	Aly Michalka; AJ Michalka; Jon Foreman; Tim Foreman; Ryan Spraker; Wilson	4:13
2.	"What It Feels Like"		5:35
3.	"Next to Nothing"	Aly Michalka; AJ Michalka; James McAlister	3:20
4.	"If You Get Lonely"		4:31
5.	"Dandelions"	Aly Michalka; AJ Michalka; Shooter Jennings; Ben Zelico	4:09
6.	"I Don't Know What It Is"	Aly Michalka; AJ Michalka; McAlister	4:16
7.	"Take Your Time"		4:04
8.	"Michael"	Aly Michalka; AJ Michalka; Connor Sullivan; Zelico	3:02
9.	"Sirens"	Aly Michalka; AJ Michalka; McAlister	5:01
10.	"Lasso"		5:40
11.	"Places to Run"	Aly Michalka; AJ Michalka; Jorge Elbrecht; Erickson; Wilson	5:24
Total length:			49:15

== Personnel ==
Credits adapted from Apple Music.
Aly & AJ

- Aly Michalka – lead vocals
- AJ Michalka – lead vocals

Additional contributors

- Jonathan Wilson – production (all tracks)
- James McAlister – production (3)
