= Nalleli Cobo =

American activist

- Born: South Los Angeles, U.S.
- Occupation: Activist
- Known for: Co-founding the South Central Youth Leadership Coalition

Nalleli Cobo is an American activist.

== Biography ==
Nalleli Cobo was raised in South Los Angeles in a Latino family. Like many of her neighbors and family members, she grew up suffering a range of severe ill-health symptoms medically attributed to toxic emissions from the nearby petroleum operations.

In 2015, she co-founded South Central Youth Leadership Coalition which joined other organisations to successfully sue the city of Los Angeles for rubber-stamping oil projects in communities of colour. The oil industry countersued, and lost. Cobo is best known for leading that coalition that helped shut down permanently the local toxic oil-drilling site and changed Los Angeles environmental law.

At age 19, in 2020, Cobo was diagnosed with stage two reproductive cancer, necessitating multiple surgeries and procedures such as radiation, chemo, and battles with infections, in treatment alone because of the COVID-19 pandemic.

Cobo and Greta Thunberg have worked together on environmental campaigns.

In 2022, Cobo was awarded the Goldman Environmental Prize list. for North America . She was also included on the Time100 Next list.

In 2025, Cobo was a keynote speaker at Verdical Group's annual Net Zero Conference.

In 2023, Cobo was the keynote speaker at The Climate Center's annual Climate Policy Summit in Sacramento, California

== Awards and recognition ==
- 2022: Goldman Environmental Prize
- 2022: California Energy Commission Clean Energy Hall of Fame
- 2022: TIME 100 Next
- 2022: Apolitical Top 100 Most Influential People in Climate
- 2022: Sachamama Top 100 Latinos Committed to Climate Action
- 2022: Business Insider Top 100 People Transforming Business
- 2020: Rose Braz Award for Bold Activism
- 2019: Aris and Carolyn Anagnos Culture of Liberation Award
- 2019: Center for Diverse Leadership (CDLS) Fellow
- 2018: Women in Green Youth Trailblazer Award
- 2018: Liberty Hill Foundation Leader to Watch
- 2017: South Coast Air Quality Management District; Youth Leadership in Air Quality
- 2017: KCET Local Hero
- 2017: Univisión Agente de Cambio
