= Project HEAL =

Nonprofit org focused on eating disorders

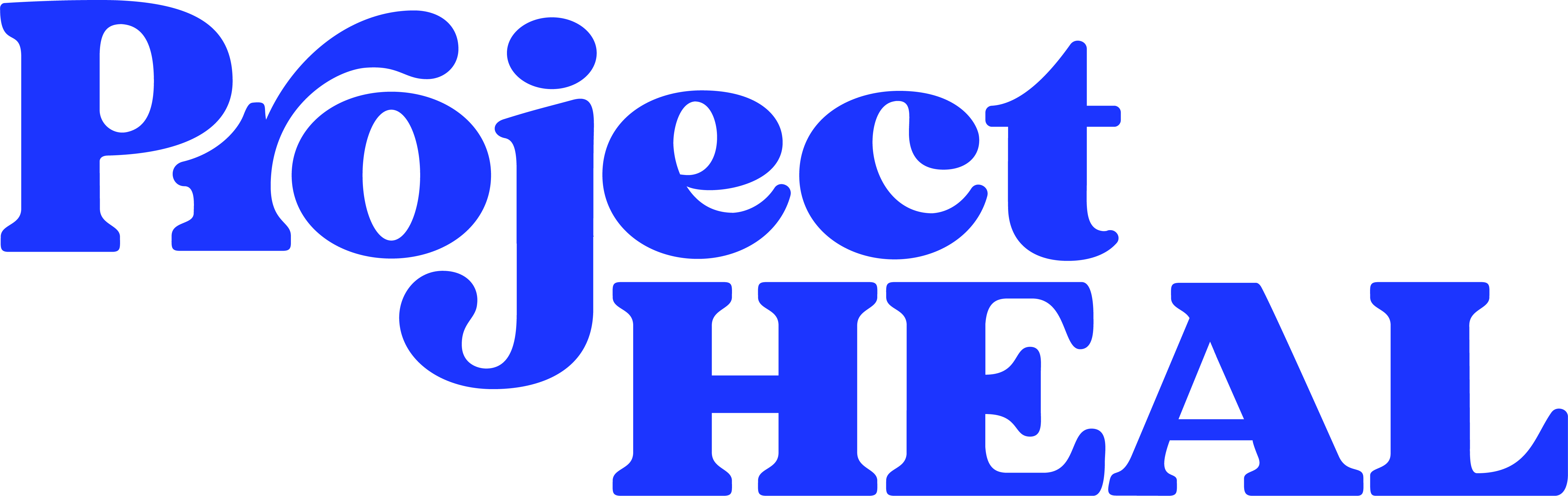
Project HEAL logo

Project HEAL (Help to Eat, Accept and Live) is a nonprofit organization in the U.S. focused on equitable treatment access for eating disorders. Project HEAL is the only major direct service nonprofit in the U.S. focused on equitable healthcare access for people with eating disorders. The organization's mission is to break down systemic, healthcare, and financial barriers to eating disorder treatment. The mission is delivered through four core Treatment Support programs: Insurance Navigation, Treatment Placement, Cash Assistance, and Clinical Assessment. Project HEAL is also active in research, education, and advocacy at the national level. The organization's vision is that everyone with an eating disorder has the resources and opportunities they need to recover.

According to Project HEAL, a typical treatment episode costs an average of $80,000, and full recovery can take years totaling around $250,000 total. Due to exorbitant costs, inadequate insurance coverage, and systemic bias within the eating disorder treatment system, only 20 percent of the 30 million Americans suffering from eating disorders receive treatment. Beneficiaries can apply for treatment support through the organization's website.

Project HEAL was founded in 2008 by Liana Rosenman and Kristina Saffran, who had met while undergoing treatment for anorexia nervosa. In honor of their work, Rosenman and Saffran were named to the 2017 Forbes 30 Under 30 Social Entrepreneurs list. Also in 2017, the organization partnered with the producers of To The Bone, a film about anorexia that was released worldwide on Netflix in July 2017.

Since inception, Project HEAL has helped hundreds of people access treatment and are spearheading a movement to reform and transform the American mental health care system to work for everyone, not just the privileged few.

In February 2025, Project HEAL and Greenspace Health announced an educational partnership aimed at advancing data-driven treatment approaches for eating disorders.
