= With Love From =

Studio album by Aly & AJ
- Released: March 15, 2023
- Genres: Americana; folk; indie pop
- Length: 40:16
- Labels: Aly & AJ Music; AWAL
- Producers: Aly Michalka; AJ Michalka; James McAlister; Yves Rothman

Aly & AJ chronology
A Touch of the Beat Gets You Up on Your Feet Gets You Out and Then Into the Sun (2021)	With Love From (2023)	Lonesome Dove (2023)

Singles from With Love From
- 1. "With Love From" Released: November 2, 2022; 2. "Baby Lay Your Head Down" Released: January 25, 2023; 3. "After Hours" Released: February 15, 2023; 4. "Blue Dress" Released: August 31, 2023

With Love From is the fifth studio album by American duo Aly & AJ, released on March 15, 2023, through AWAL. The duo promoted the album with an 18-date tour across North America in 2023.

== Composition ==
With Love From explores Americana, folk music, and indie pop with influences from country music. Regarding this stylistic choice, AJ Michalka said "I think being that Aly and I come from pop songwriting, that will always be an underbelly to our writing. But I do think opening up into an Americana kind of folk fits Aly and I really well. It's something that we wanted to pursue when we were younger. We also grew up listening to a lot of music that fell into that category. But in a way, when you're a strong songwriter and you're really confident in your work and you're open to working with other people and you're open to diverse ideas, when it comes to kind of floating between genres, I think that's when you can shine because you're not boxing yourself into a genre."

The album was recorded shortly after the release of A Touch of the Beat Gets You Up on Your Feet Gets You Out and Then Into the Sun and enlisted many of the same collaborators. The duo recorded the song live-to-tape when possible, which gives the record "a less glossy, more lived-in feel with lots of raggedly distorted guitars and spacey echo high in the mix". In a review for Paste, Anna Govert wrote "More than anything, Aly & AJ have proven once again that they are so much more than the music they made when they were teenagers. Aly & AJ are releasing career-defining music (and have been for the past six years), and With Love From might top A Touch of the Beat as their best album to date."

== Critical reception ==
Professional ratings
Review scores
Source	Rating
AllMusic	4/5 stars
Paste	8.1/10
PopMatters	7/10

AllMusic writer Heather Phares praised the group's new sound, but considered the more straightforward pop songs to be "forced". Rachel R. Carroll of PopMatters wrote that "While With Love From is not the most visionary pop record released in recent years, it doesn’t need to be. Aly & AJ have an unflinching and often wry songwriting style that is recognizably theirs. They may not have taken many risks with their sound since a touch of the beat, but the care with which they craft their soundscapes makes the argument that consistency doesn’t have to be boring".

== Track listing ==
All tracks are written by Aly Michalka and AJ Michalka, and Ryan Spraker, except where noted. Produced by Yves Rothman (all tracks), Aly Michalka and AJ Michalka (1, 3–11), and James McAlister (2, 8).

No.	Title	Writer(s)	Length
1.	"Open to Something and that Something Is You"		3:24
2.	"With Love From"	Aly Michalka; AJ Michalka; McAlister	3:59
3.	"After Hours"		2:56
4.	"Blue Dress"		4:08
5.	"Love You This Way"	Aly Michalka; AJ Michalka; Jorge Elbrecht	3:12
6.	"Way of Nature Way of Grace" (featuring Joy Oladokun)	Aly Michalka; AJ Michalka; Thad Cockrell; Eddie Spear	4:01
7.	"Tear the Night Up"	Aly Michalka; AJ Michalka; Elbrecht; Yves Rothman	3:28
8.	"Sunchoke"	Aly Michalka; AJ Michalka; McAlister; Rothman	3:23
9.	"Talking in My Sleep"	Aly Michalka; AJ Michalka; Leah Haywood; Dan Pringle	2:51
10.	"Baby Lay Your Head Down"		3:44
11.	"6 Months of Staring Into the Sun"		5:10
Total length:			40:16

== Personnel ==
Aly & AJ

- Aly Michalka – vocals (all tracks), production (1, 3–11)
- AJ Michalka – vocals (all tracks), production (1, 3–11)

Additional musicians

- Joe Kennedy – acoustic piano, organ, synthesizers, guitars
- Yves Rothman – synthesizers (3, 6, 7), drum programming (3, 6, 7), production (all tracks)
- Sam Stewart – guitars
- Amir Yaghmai – guitars (1, 4)
- Connor Sullivan – pedal steel guitar (1, 4), guitars (2)
- Keith Karman – bass
- James McAlister – drums (all tracks), percussion (all tracks), production (2, 8)
- Sylvain Carton – saxophone (3, 7)
- Joy Oladokun – vocals (6)

== Release history ==
Release history for With Love From
Region	Date	Format	Ref.
Various	March 15, 2023	digital download; streaming	
Various	August 31, 2023	LP; CD; cassette	
