= Sanctuary (Aly & AJ EP) =

EP by Aly & AJ
- Released: May 10, 2019
- Genre: Synth-pop; electropop
- Length: 16:50
- Label: Aly & AJ
- Producer: Yves Rothman; Ben Zelico; Ryan Spraker

Aly & AJ chronology
Ten Years (2017)	Sanctuary (2019)	A Touch of the Beat Gets You Up on Your Feet Gets You Out and Then Into the Sun (2021)

Singles from Sanctuary
- 1. "Church" Released: March 29, 2019; 2. "Don't Go Changing" Released: April 26, 2019; 3. "Star Maps" Released: June 12, 2019

Sanctuary is the second extended play (EP) by American pop music duo Aly & AJ. It was released on May 10, 2019, through the duo's independent label Aly & AJ Music LLC. The EP follows Aly & AJ's first EP, Ten Years (2017). A continuation of the 1980s-inspired sound found on Ten Years, Sanctuary is a synth-pop and electropop EP that discusses themes of love, mental health, and life. Sanctuary was positively received by music critics, who praised the EP's further exploration of 1980s synth-pop, while also praising the duo's musical growth.

Commercially, Sanctuary peaked at #29 on the US Independent Albums chart, while entering the lower region of the Album Downloads chart in France. Sanctuary was preceded by the release of two singles: "Church" was released as the lead single on March 29, 2019, followed by "Don't Go Changing", released on April 26, 2019. The duo additionally embarked on the Sanctuary Tour in North America and Europe to promote the EP.

== Background ==
Sanctuary follows the release of their first EP Ten Years, as well as its deluxe edition released a year later. The duo has described Sanctuary as the next chapter following Ten Years. The duo recorded many of the songs separately, but found a running theme as the album was finalized and considered the title track an apt way to summarize the EP.

== Composition ==
Musically, Sanctuary is a synth-pop and electropop EP that discusses themes of love, mental health, and life. Lead single "Church" serves as the opening track. It is an "introspective" pop song that contains vocoder effects and the duo harmonizing over textured synthesizers. Lyrically, it discusses themes of seeking rebirth and redemption. Second single "Don't Go Changing" is a synth-pop anthem that touches on themes of self-love and positivity. "Star Maps" was written in 2017, described by the duo as an "ode to the #MeToo movement". Musically, it contains an "explosive" chorus. "Not Ready To Wake Up" musically incorporates lush production, while lyrically discussing bliss in a relationship, described by the duo as a "classic love song". The titular track serves as the closer to the EP, co-written by the duo alongside Totem, the latter of whom began working on the song. Mike Nied, writing for Idolator, interpreted "Sanctuary" as "both a traditional love song and a message to fans they met on the road".

== Promotion ==
=== Singles ===
"Church" was released as the EP's lead single on March 29, 2019. A music video was later released to promote the single. "Don't Go Changing" was released as the second single on April 26, 2019. "Star Maps" was released as the third and final single on June 12, alongside a music video featuring numerous celebrity cameos.

=== Tour ===
Aly & AJ embarked on the Sanctuary Tour to promote the EP. The North American leg began on May 1, 2019, and ran until June 27. A European leg of the tour will follow. The duo announced the tour would be in support of The Trevor Project as a way to give back to LGBTQ fans.

== Critical reception ==
Sanctuary received positive reviews from music critics. Gabe Bergado, writing for Teen Vogue, referred to the EP as "a project elevating the fresh, bright aesthetic they have found in recent years". Michael Love Michael, writing for Paper, wrote that the EP "builds on [the] momentum [of Ten Years], with immaculately conceived electro-pop driven by essential messages about life, love, mental health, and all the unexpected in-betweens". Mike Nied, writing for Idolator, called the EP "essential listening for any pop fan". Brittany Spanos of Rolling Stone wrote that the EP "offers another elevated take on their synth-pop sound, this time with more Eighties inflections and even tighter harmonies".

== Track listing ==
Credits for Sanctuary - EP adapted from liner notes.

Sanctuary
No.	Title	Writer(s)	Producer(s)	Length
1.	"Church"	Aly Michalka; AJ Michalka; Yves Rothman; Mick Coogan; Josh Wei	Rothman; Ben Zelico^{[a]}	3:15
2.	"Don't Go Changing"	Michalka; Michalka; Ryan Spraker; Nick Dungo; Rainey Qualley	Spraker	3:08
3.	"Star Maps"	Michalka; Michalka; Rothman; Jeremiah Raisen	Rothman; Zelico^{[b]}	3:02
4.	"Not Ready to Wake Up"	Michalka; Michalka; Rothman; Raisen; Coogan	Spraker; Rothman^{[a]}	3:17
5.	"Sanctuary"	Michalka; Michalka; Spraker; Tom Peyton; Totem	Spraker	4:12
Total length:				16:50

Notes

- ^{^[a]} signifies a co-producer
- ^{^[b]} signifies an additional producer

== Charts ==
Chart (2019)	Peak position
France Downloads Albums (SNEP)	132
US Independent Albums (Billboard)	29

== Release history ==
List of regions, release dates, showing formats, labels and references
Region	Date	Label	Format	Ref.
Various	May 10, 2019	Aly & AJ LLC	Digital download; CD	
Various	June 10, 2019	Aly & AJ LLC	Vinyl	
