= Hothouse (song) =

Single by 78violet
- Released: July 8, 2013
- Recorded: 2012
- Genre: Pop; folk pop; indie pop; dream pop; indie rock
- Length: 4:04
- Label: 78Violet Music LLC
- Songwriters: Aly Michalka; AJ Michalka; Mike Einziger
- Producer: David Kahne

78violet singles chronology
"Like Whoa" (2008)	"Hothouse" (2013)	"Take Me" (2017)

Music video
- Hothouse on YouTube

"Hothouse" is a song by American band 78violet. It is their first single release since their renaming from Aly & AJ in 2009 and only single released under the name before they returned to Aly & AJ in 2015. It was released on July 8, 2013. The song was written by sisters Aly and AJ Michalka, and Mike Einziger (of the band Incubus), while production was handled by David Kahne. The single was noted for showcasing a change in musical direction for the duo.

== Composition ==
"Hothouse" incorporates a wide variety of musical influences, including pop, folk pop, indie pop, dream pop, and indie rock. The song introduces the public to a new psychedelic sound from the duo that strays from their commercial pop rock roots. "When you hear it, it kind of takes you a little bit back to the '60s, '70s and has that throwback sound as well as the female strength," older sister Aly, 24, told MTV News. The single was musically compared to Lana Del Rey and She & Him.

== Promotion ==
Immediately after the single's release the duo began promotion. On June 26 the girls performed their first concert in five years at the Roxy Theater in West Hollywood. The duo appeared in several interviews, beginning with ClevverNews where they discussed the single and album. The day of the release they interviewed on HuffPost live with Ahmed. On July 9 they hosted a concert in New York City at the Gramercy Theater. The duo also performed "Boy" and "Hothouse" live on Billboard's Tastemakers. Along with a performance on Vevo. During this time the duo would be nominated for "Best Siblings in Pop" on Popdust and would single-handedly beat out the Jonas Brothers, the McClain Sisters, and Chord and Nash Overstreet.

== Music video ==
A self-directed music video was released the same day as the single. The video acts as a short film similar in style to those of Lana Del Rey. It features scenes of Aly and AJ in different looks and verdant locations from a mountainside and forest to an actual greenhouse.

== Cancelled album ==
In 2013, Hothouse was released as the first single off of 78violet's upcoming album, which was also supposed to feature their second single, "Boy," which was later cancelled. The album was leaked in 2013, leading to 78violet to cancel all plans to release an album. "Boy" was featured in their 2015 movie, Weepah Way for Now.

== Track listing ==
- Digital single release
  1. "Hothouse" - 4:04

== Release history ==
Country	Date	Format	Label	Ref.
Worldwide	July 8, 2013	Digital download	78violet Music LLC	
