= Like Whoa =

Single by Aly & AJ

from the album Insomniatic
- Released: March 18, 2008
- Recorded: 2007
- Genre: Pop rock; dance-rock; electropop
- Length: 2:31 (album); 2:25 (remix)
- Label: Hollywood
- Songwriters: Aly Michalka; AJ Michalka; Tim James; Antonina Armato

Aly & AJ singles chronology
"Potential Breakup Song" (2007)	"Like Whoa" (2008)	"Hothouse" (2013)

Music video
- Like Whoa on YouTube (by Hollywood Records)

"Like Whoa" is a song by American pop rock duo Aly & AJ, written and recorded by the duo for their second studio album, Insomniatic. It is the second and final single from the album, released in 2008. The single release in the UK was cancelled for unknown reasons. It was their final single to be released before departing from Hollywood Records. A re-recorded version of the song was released on May 2, 2022.

== Song information and appearances ==
"Like Whoa" is a song about the thrill feeling of being in a new relationship. The album version of the song was used in the Disney Channel Original Movie Minutemen, and can also be heard playing during High School Musical 3: Senior Year. The remix of the song was made digitally available on March 18, 2008, on iTunes, alongside an acoustic version and interview. The song is a playable track on Band Hero and The Smurfs Dance Party.

The song is written in the key of A♭ major with a moderate tempo of 121 beats per minute.

== Critical reception ==
The song received mainly positive comments on album reviews. UMusic describes the song: "Like Whoa" starts with soft cooing and transitions into a high energy danceable chorus."

Todd Sterling, from Wal-Mart, praises the song: ""Like Whoa," a penetrating, bass driven cut compares the sensation of falling in love with a rollercoaster ride. The song, lathered in slippery keyboard effects and programmed drums, is a melodically layered chunk of pop candy."

Logan Leasure, from Jesus Freak Hideout, named the song a "sure-to-be-hit" and describes it as "an upbeat, catchy song that gives a positive outlook on life."

== Track listings and formats ==
- iTunes EP

No.	Title	Length
1.	"Like Whoa" (Remix Version)	2:29
2.	"Like Whoa" (Acoustic Version)	2:42
3.	"Radio Disney Exclusive Interview"	2:07

- 2-track US promo

No.	Title	Length
1.	"Like Whoa" (Album Version)	2:31
2.	"Like Whoa" (Remix Version)	2:29

== Music video ==
On December 3, 2007, Aly & AJ announced, via a blog on their Myspace, that the video for "Like Whoa" would be shot during the same week. The girls also stated that they shot the video with director Scott Speer and that "it's very different from what we've already done". Pictures from the shoot of the music video had leaked onto the internet on December 15, 2007, showing them in four different sets, Aly jumping on the trampoline, both of them on a sofa and similar scenes with 1950s style microphones as in the music video of "Potential Breakup Song" amongst others.

The video premiered on YouTube on January 18, 2008. Disney Channel first aired the music video with footage of the original movie, Minutemen, during Wizards of Waverly Place on January 19, 2008 to promote the film. The video, without the footage from Minutemen and with new scenes, was released on January 31, 2008 on the Hollywood Records YouTube channel. When Aly & AJ were backstage at the Littlest Pet Shop event in 2008, a new version of the "Like Whoa" video, which combines scenes from both the previous two videos, as well as new scenes, premiered.

The video has been released to Canada's MuchMusic, Yahoo! and it also has been shown on MTV Asia, reaching number two on the Chart Attack. To date, the video has garnered, on combined Hollywood Record's account and Aly & AJ's account, over 28 million views.

== Chart performance ==
As of February 27, 2008, the album version has logged over 558,084 digital downloads in the United States, reaching a peak position of number 63 on the Billboard Hot 100, enough to earn a Gold certification. The song also debuted at number 66 on the Canadian Hot 100, already peaking higher than preceding single "Potential Breakup Song" at number 72. Upon release of the remix version, the track re-entered the Hot 100 at number 92 after falling off the week before its release. The song has been certified gold by the Recording Industry Association of America for equivalent sales of 500,000 units in the United States.

=== Charts ===
Chart (2007–08)	Peak position
Australia (ARIA)	92
Canada Hot 100 (Billboard)	66
US Billboard Hot 100	63
US Pop Airplay (Billboard)	47
UK Singles (OCC)	165

== Certifications ==
Region	Certification	Certified units/sales
United States (RIAA)	Gold	500,000^{‡}
^{‡} Sales+streaming figures based on certification alone.
