= Aly & AJ =

American indie pop duo

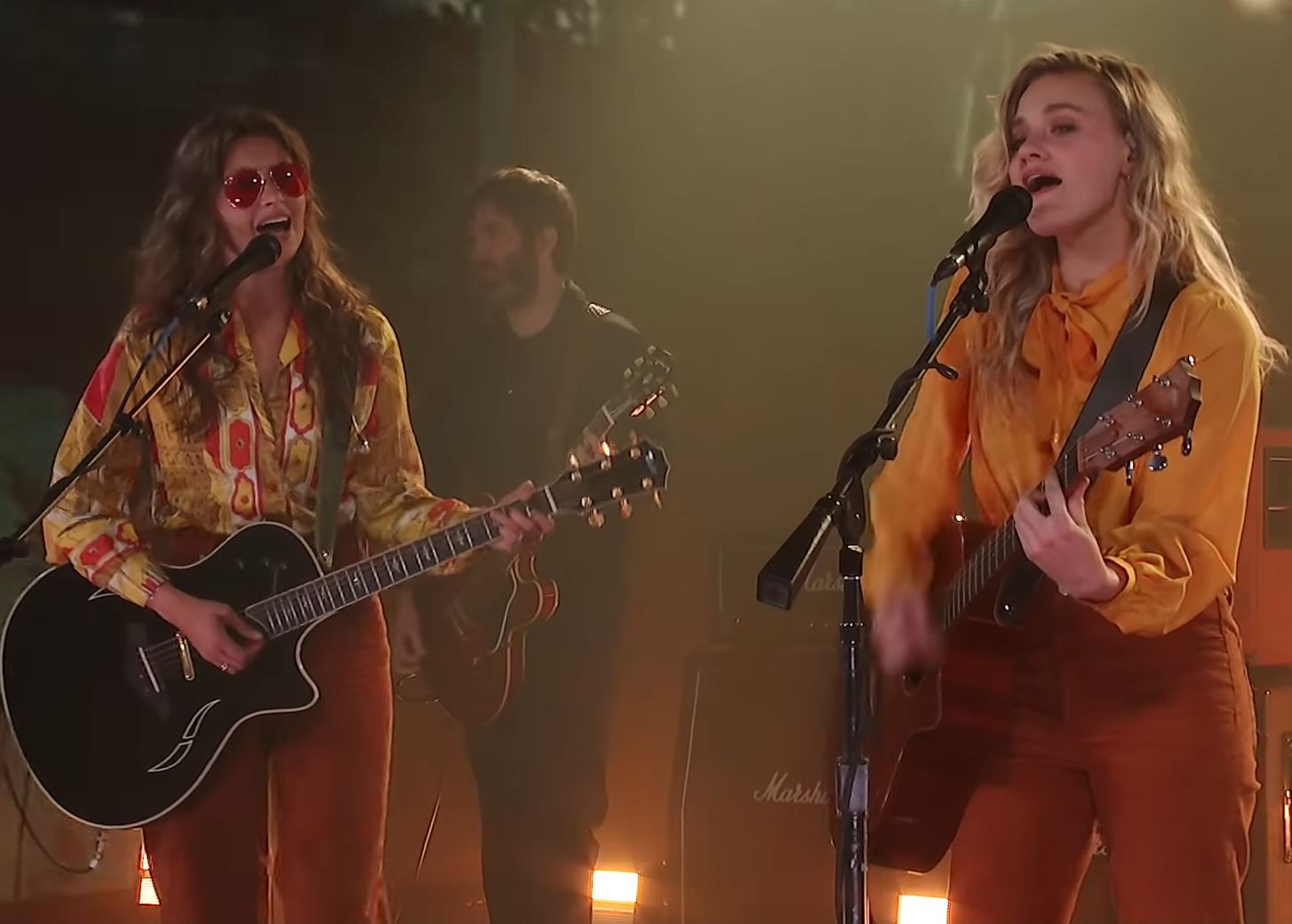
- Aly & AJ performing in April 2021

Background information
- Also known as: 78violet (2009–2015)
- Origin: Torrance, California, U.S.
- Genres: Pop rock; indie pop; synth-pop
- Years active: 2004–present
- Labels: AWAL; Hollywood; 78violet Music LLC
- Members: Aly Michalka; AJ Michalka
- Website: alyandaj.com

Aly & AJ is an American pop rock duo consisting of sisters Alyson "Aly" Michalka (born 1989) and Amanda Joy "AJ" Michalka (born 1991) from Torrance, California. They signed with Hollywood Records and in 2005, they released their debut album Into the Rush. The album was certified Gold by the RIAA and contained the singles "Rush" and "Chemicals React". They followed this release with the albums Acoustic Hearts of Winter (2006) and Insomniatic (2007). The latter contained the Platinum single "Potential Breakup Song", which was a top 20 hit on the Billboard Hot 100. They departed from their record label in 2010 and briefly changed their name to 78violet, releasing the single "Hothouse" in 2013.

Following a period of inactivity in music, the duo reverted to their original name and released the extended plays Ten Years (2017) and Sanctuary (2019), followed by the studio albums A Touch of the Beat Gets You Up on Your Feet Gets You Out and Then Into the Sun (2021), With Love From (2023) and Silver Deliverer (2025).

== History ==
=== 2004–2006: Into the Rush and Acoustic Hearts of Winter ===
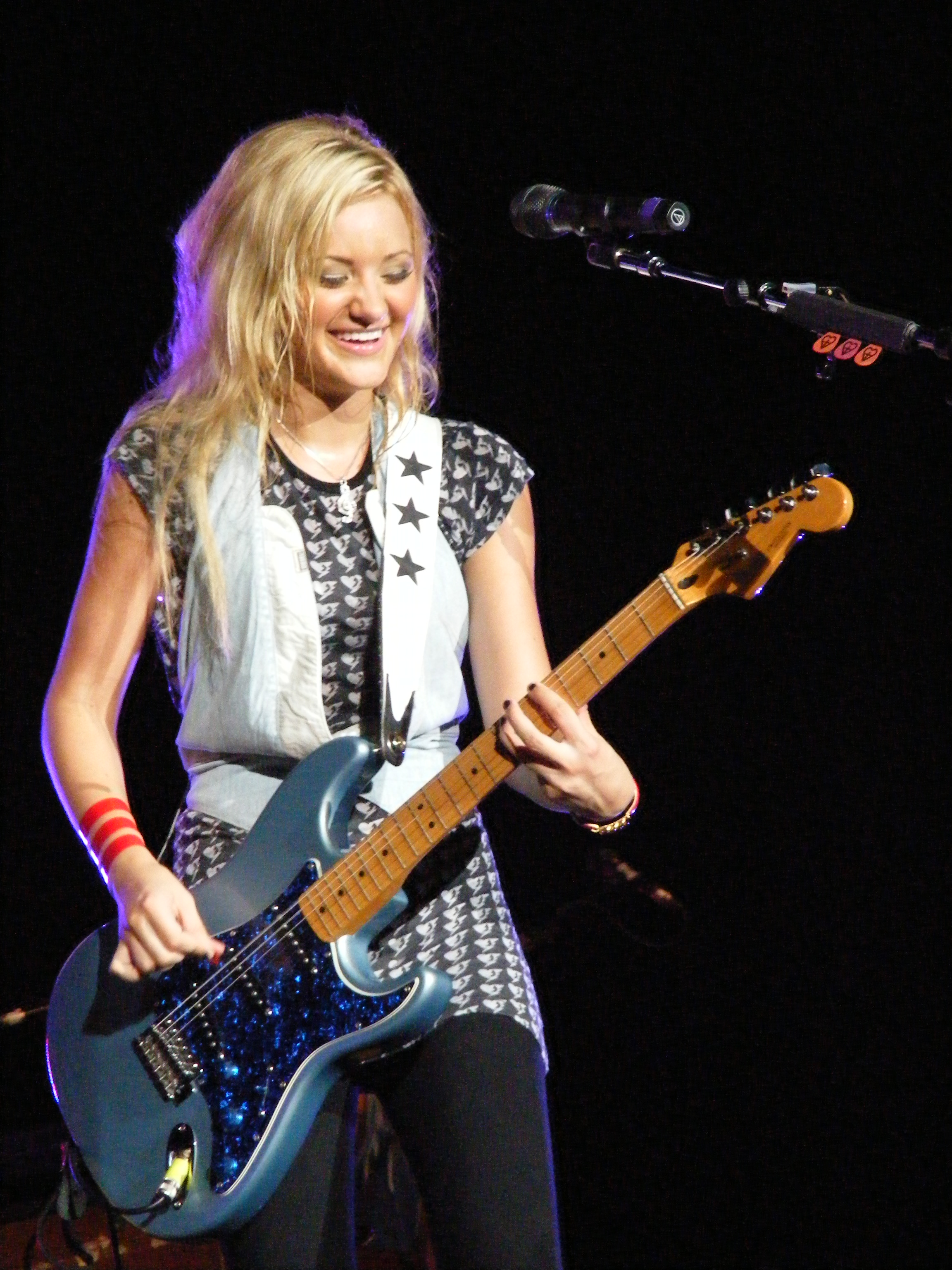
AJ Michalka in concert in August 2007

In 2004, when Aly was 15 years old and AJ was 13 years old, the duo signed a recording contract with Hollywood Records after an audition in which they performed six original acoustic guitar songs they had written. Aly & AJ's debut studio album, Into the Rush, was released on August 16, 2005. It debuted at number 36 on the US Billboard 200 and was certified gold by the Recording Industry Association of America (RIAA) in March 2006. The first single released from the album was the cover song "Do You Believe in Magic", originally recorded by The Lovin' Spoonful, which was used in the soundtrack of the made-for-TV Disney Channel original movie, Now You See It..., in which Aly had a starring role as Allyson Henlen. "Do You Believe in Magic" peaked at No. 2 on the U.S. Billboard Hot Singles Sales chart. The album's second single, "No One", was featured in the Walt Disney Pictures feature film Ice Princess and its soundtrack. "Walking on Sunshine", a cover of the Katrina and the Waves song, and "Never Far Behind" were released as further singles. The latter appeared on the Billboard Hot Christian Songs chart, peaking at number 28. On February 28, 2006, the fifth single from the album, "Rush", written with Daniel James and Leah Haywood, was released. The song was their first to chart on the Billboard Hot 100, peaking at number 59. "On the Ride" was released as the album's sixth single on March 7, 2006. It was featured in the Disney Channel Original Movie Cow Belles which starred Aly & AJ.

The sisters were involved in various Walt Disney Records projects. The "Aly & AJ Concert" took place on July 24, 2005, at the Henry Fonda theater in Hollywood, California. The aired concert was cut to five songs. The sisters opened for the Cheetah Girls in December 2005 on the Cheetah-licious Christmas Tour. Into the Rush was re-released in August 2006 with three new songs, including the single "Chemicals React" and new versions of "Collapsed" and "Something More". This version served as their first album release in the United Kingdom. "Chemicals React" peaked at number 50 on the Billboard Hot 100. On September 26, 2006, the sisters released their second studio album, Acoustic Hearts of Winter, which is composed of contemporary recordings of traditional Christmas music. The album debuted at number 78 on the Billboard 200, selling over 19,000 copies in its first week. The album also charted the US Billboard Top Holiday Albums, debuting at number 14. In late 2007, the album was reissued with three more Christmas songs.

=== 2007–2008: Insomniatic ===
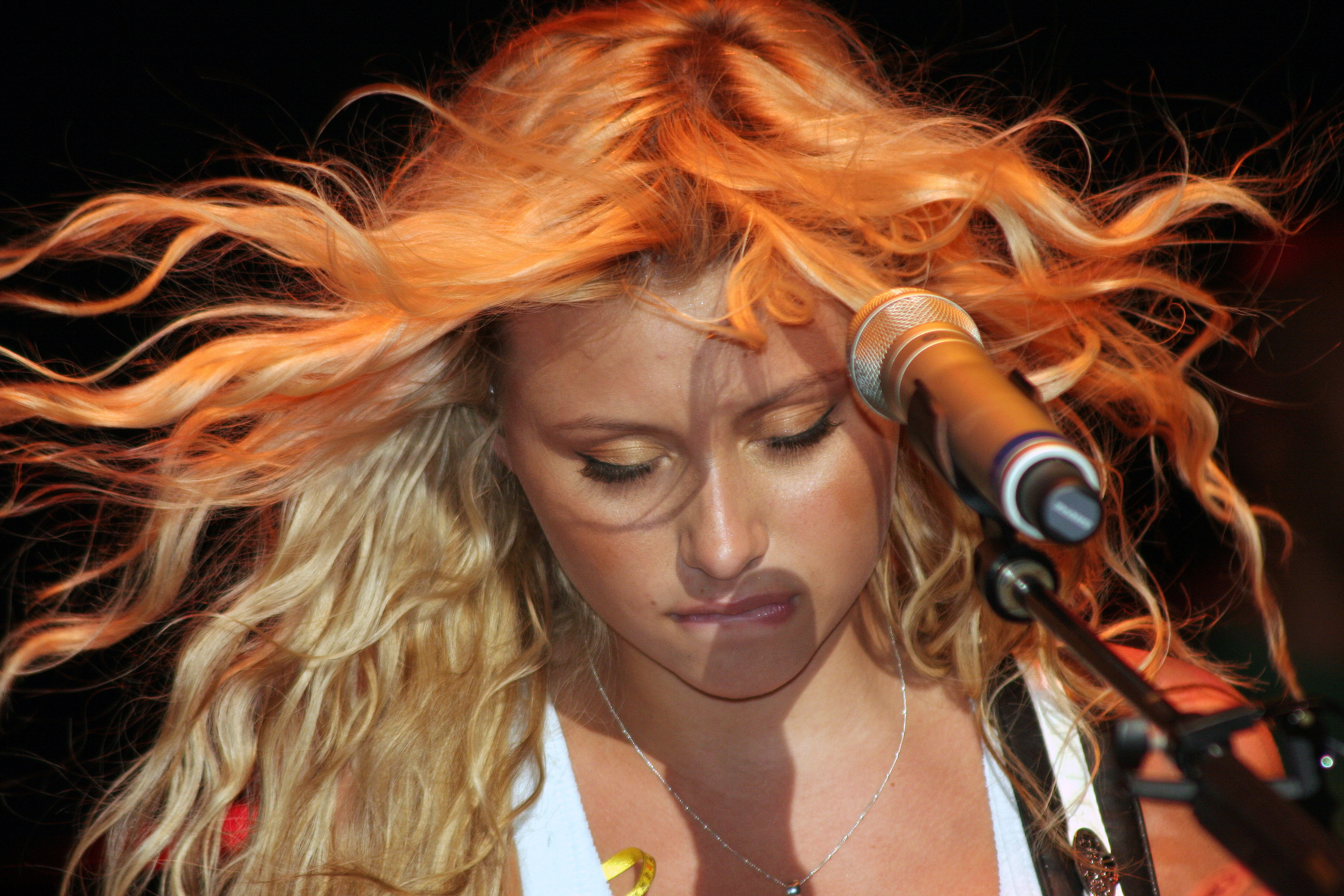
Aly Michalka in concert on June 21, 2008, in Valdosta, Georgia

The duo's third studio album, Insomniatic, was released on July 10, 2007. The album peaked at number 15 on the Billboard 200, selling over 39,000 copies in its first week and becoming Aly & AJ's highest debut to date. The album features a more electropop, electronic rock and dance-pop influenced sound different from their debut, with the use of synthesizers, synth-rock guitars, vocoder and electronic instruments. The album was preceded by the lead single "Potential Breakup Song". "Potential Breakup Song" peaked at number 17 on the Billboard Hot 100, becoming their first top 20 single in the United States. The single was certified two-times Platinum by the RIAA for sales and streams equivalent to two million units sold.

In October 2007, both the single and the album were released in the United Kingdom; "Potential Breakup Song" reached a peak position of No. 22 in the United Kingdom and No. 16 in Ireland. Aly & AJ toured for a short while in the UK, opening for McFly twice and performing at several television shows and nightclubs. In the UK, "Potential Breakup Song" was certified Silver by the British Phonographic Industry. Time magazine named "Potential Breakup Song" one of the 10 Best Songs of 2007, ranking it at No. 9. Writer Josh Tyrangiel praised the authenticity of its having been written by the teenage sisters who sing it. The single also charted in several other European countries, performing moderately in the Netherlands, Norway, and Scotland.

In December 2007, for two weeks, the band was the opening act for Miley Cyrus's Best of Both Worlds Tour. In early January 2008, Aly & AJ performed a cover of KT Tunstall's "Black Horse and the Cherry Tree" on Yahoo's Pepsi Smash video site. The cover, recorded at Abbey Road Studios, was featured on the Japanese re-release of Insomniatic. In March 2008, "Like Whoa" was released as the second single from Insomniatic and peaked at number 63 on the Billboard Hot 100. The song was also used to promote the Disney Channel Original Movie Minutemen. That year, Aly & AJ covered the Grand Funk Railroad song "We're an American Band" for Randy Jackson's Music Club, Vol. 1.

=== 2009–2016: Departure from Hollywood Records, 78violet ===
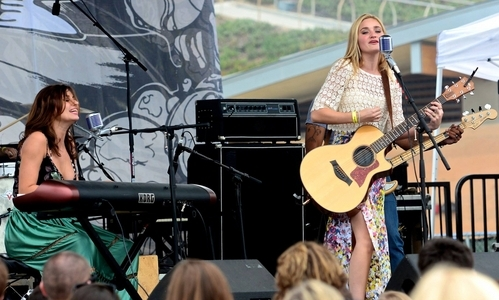
Aly & AJ live at the Bro Am concert in July 2013

In early 2008, Aly & AJ were working on a fourth studio album under Hollywood Records which was due to be released in late 2009. They mentioned in an interview with Radio Disney on April 23, 2008, that they were going for a "rockier" sound, and that this time they wanted to sing separately, not harmonizing their voices as they had on their previous albums, to let fans identify which Michalka sister was singing. In December 2008, the duo wrote a song (later confirmed to be titled "The Next Worst Thing") with Weezer frontman Rivers Cuomo.

On July 8, 2009, the duo changed their name to 78violet. They continued to work on their fourth Hollywood Records album, which was later completed, but its release was delayed numerous times. In May 2010, the duo announced that they had departed from the label, and the album was shelved. On November 30, 2010, the first song under the 78violet name was released on the Hellcats soundtrack EP. 78violet recorded the theme song to Hellcats, titled "Belong Here". Some of the titles being considered for 78violet's fourth album were 8 Hours and 53rd floor. On May 2, 2013, Aly & AJ signed to Red Light Management. The single "Hothouse" was released on July 8, 2013. The duo performed live for the first time in five years with a concert at the Roxy Theater in Los Angeles on June 26. The group announced that they would be releasing an EP in early 2014, however, this never materialized. The full Hothouse EP was leaked in its entirety in 2014; the duo released it on vinyl as Sanctuary: Vol. 1 in 2020 for first-year subscribers of their Sanctuary fan-club.

In December 2015, the sisters changed their band name back to Aly & AJ.

=== 2017–2022: Return to music ===
"Take Me", a new single, served as the lead single from their EP Ten Years, and was released on August 17, 2017. The accompanying music video was released on September 14, 2017. The Ten Years EP was released on November 17, 2017. Two tracks from the EP, "I Know" and "The Distance", were featured in season 4 of Aly's TV series iZombie. On June 15, 2018, the duo released the single "Good Love". A deluxe version of Ten Years was released on November 30, 2018.

On March 29, 2019, the pair released the single "Church" as the lead single from their second EP Sanctuary, released on May 10. The EP was supported by a North American tour of the same name which began on May 1, 2019. The duo released the singles "Attack of Panic" in February 2020, and "Joan of Arc on the Dance Floor" in May. In December 2020, songs from both Ten Years and Sanctuary, as well as the non-album singles, were later released onto a compilation album titled We Don't Stop.

Their fourth studio album, A Touch of the Beat Gets You Up on Your Feet Gets You Out and Then Into the Sun, was released on May 7, 2021. The album was preceded by the singles "Slow Dancing" on December 2, 2020, and "Listen!!!" in January 2021. Following the growing popularity of "Potential Breakup Song" on the social media app TikTok, Aly & AJ released two re-recorded versions of the song in December 2020: one with clean lyrics and an explicit version. In July 2021, the duo performed at Lollapalooza for the first time. Following the re-recording of "Potential Breakup Song", the duo released re-recordings of their songs "Like Whoa" and "Chemicals React" in 2022, subtitled "(A&A Version)". In October 2022, they performed at Austin City Limits.

=== 2023–present: With Love From and Silver Deliverer ===
Aly & AJ's fifth studio album, With Love From, was released on March 15, 2023. It was preceded by the title track as the lead single on November 2, 2022; the second single "Baby Lay Your Head Down" on January 25, 2023; and the third single "After Hours" on February 15. Later that year, they released a Christmas music EP titled Lonesome Dove.

The duo released "What It Feels Like" on January 10, 2025, as the lead single from their sixth studio album, Silver Deliverer. It was followed by "Next To Nothing" on April 4. The album was released on May 2, 2025, and the duo is scheduled to tour starting in September 2025.

== Activism ==
The duo has used their platform for political advocacy, including support of LGBTQ+ rights, voter registration, Black Lives Matter, Planned Parenthood, and support for certain candidates in the Democratic Party.

In a post on Twitter in January 2017, the duo expressed support for Planned Parenthood. In 2019, the duo partnered with HeadCount, enabling voter registration at the duo's concerts. The duo also partnered with The Trevor Project, an organization dedicated to youth suicide prevention in the LGBTQ+ community. They also partnered with Project HEAL, a charity dedicated to increasing access to treatment for eating disorders. The duo donated signed merchandise and other memorabilia to raise funds for these causes.

In April 2019, in an op-ed published in Paper magazine, the sisters revealed their struggles with depression and anxiety to raise awareness and remove stigma around mental health medication. The piece also highlighted the struggles of LGBTQ+ youth. In February 2020, the duo released single "Attack of Panic", which dealt with themes of anxiety and panic attacks.

In May 2020, they released a music video for their single "Joan of Arc on the Dance Floor", directed by Aly and her husband, Stephen Ringer, that featured clips of Republican members of the United States Senate Committee on the Judiciary who were responsible for the 2018 Supreme Court confirmation of Brett Kavanaugh after sexual assault allegations against him. The video's credits thank his accuser, Christine Blasey Ford, and Anita Hill, who accused Clarence Thomas of sexual harassment in 1991 prior to his appointment to the Supreme Court of the United States. Also in May 2020, the duo expressed support for Black Lives Matter in a post on Twitter.

In June 2020, the duo hosted an all-night fundraising live stream, "Up All Night with Aly & AJ", which included a full live concert, acoustic performances, reactions to their earlier work and conversations with friends and collaborators, promoting donations to charities via Propeller.la. The stream raised US$30,000 for 13 charities, featuring one every hour: Color of Change, Frontline Foods, National Independent Venue Association's Save our Stages, Project HEAL, Women's History Museum, The Art of Elysium, The Trevor Project, Nalleli Cobo, GLAAD, Sierra Club, MusiCares, The Beauty Bus Foundation, and the Red Cross.

In October 2020, the pair participated in canvassing events for Senate candidate Amy McGrath and in January 2021, they supported Senate candidates Jon Ossoff and Raphael Warnock in the 2020–21 United States Senate special election in Georgia. They also supported Joe Biden in the general election of the 2020 United States presidential election and Kamala Harris in the 2024 election.

In summer 2021, via Propeller.la, the duo offered a chance for a fan who supported their causes to meet them.

== Other work ==
=== Acting ===
The duo have both pursued separate acting careers outside of their music, as well as having starred in some joint projects. Most notably, the pair starred as sisters in the 2006 Disney Channel Original movie Cow Belles, with "On the Ride" from their debut album Into The Rush serving as the movie's theme song. The sisters also starred in a Disney Channel television pilot Haversham Hall, although the show was not picked up for series. In 2015, the pair starred together in Weepah Way for Now, an independent comedy-drama film which premiered at the Los Angeles Film Festival. The film was produced by the duo and written & directed by Aly's husband Stephen Ringer. The pair played sisters again in the movie, with the characters loosely based on their own personalities and relationship. They were featured in the March 7, 2022, episode "Yippee Ki-Yay" of The Good Doctor as a fractured sister act.

=== Branded merchandise ===
In 2007, Huckleberry Toys released Limited Edition Hello Kitty Aly & AJ dolls to selected Target and Toys "R" Us stores. Also in 2007, Frame Studios released The Aly & AJ Adventure game for the Nintendo DS. In the game, the player plays as their assistant, who helps them record songs and direct a music video.

In June 2008, the duo released paperback adventure books called Aly & AJ's Rock 'n' Roll Mysteries, each part describing Aly & AJ on tour, every book describing a mystery in a different city. The drawings in the books were done by Aly. The first two, First Stop, New York and Mayhem in Miami, were released on June 12, the third, Singing in Seattle, was released on September 2, and the last, Nashville Nights, went to stores on October 4, 2008. Performance Designed Products released Aly & AJ-designed guitars on November 10, 2008. Aly's guitar features a heart-and-crossbones print in pink (PlayStation 2) and AJ's guitar is in the shape of the Aly & AJ heart logo featuring bright pink and purple zebra print (Wii, PS2). The duo launched the guitars on October 11, 2008, during event at Universal Studios CityWalk in California. The duo also had clothing, accessories, jewelry, and cosmetics lines.

== Personal lives ==
=== Stalking incidents ===
In June 2008, Rex Mettler, from Lancaster, Ohio, was arrested for stalking the duo. He "obtained contact information for the acting and singing duo and made threats online, by phone and handwritten notes" as stated by the police. The duo was scheduled to perform in Cincinnati on June 27, 2008, where the man was present, after which the police could not confirm that any of the threats involved the Ohio show. The police later stated that "the charge against Mettler stems from incidents that began December 15, 2007" and that "Rex displayed a pattern of activity over that time that reflected multiple attempts, if not numerous attempts, at stalking these females."

In June 2010, Caesar Brantley was arrested on suspicion of stalking the duo near their home in a gated community in Calabasas, California, in violation of a restraining order that the duo had against the man. He pleaded not guilty.

=== Religion ===
Along with making music for the mainstream audience, Aly & AJ, who are both very open about their faith, were significant in the Christian music rock scene. "Never Far Behind" was only released on Christian rock radio. It reached No. 1 on Radio & Records (R&R) Christian CHR. The duo does not wish to be labeled as Christian music artists.

In 2006, the duo said that they did not believe in evolution. However, in a post on Twitter in March 2019, the duo affirmed that they do believe in evolution. In 2013, Aly said that she supported school prayer, as long as it is voluntary.

In May 2019, the duo said that their faith had gotten stronger but that they are never trying to push a certain agenda with their music.

== Discography ==
Studio albums

- Into the Rush (2005)
- Acoustic Hearts of Winter (2006)
- Insomniatic (2007)
- A Touch of the Beat Gets You Up on Your Feet Gets You Out and Then Into the Sun (2021)
- With Love From (2023)
- Silver Deliverer (2025)

== Tours ==
Main

- Mini Mall Tour (2005)
- Living Room Tour (2006)
- Holiday Season Tour (2006)
- Nextfest Summer Tour (2007) (Co-headlining with Corbin Bleu, Drake Bell, and Bianca Ryan)
- Insomniatic Tour (2008)
- Mini Summer Tour (2008)
- Promises Tour (2018)
- Sanctuary Tour (2019)
- A Touch of the Beat Tour (2022)
- With Love From Tour (2023)

Date (2023)	City	Country	Venue
March 30	Oakland	United States	Fox Theater
April 1	Portland	United States	Crystal Ballroom
April 2	Seattle	United States	The Paramount Theater
April 4	Denver	United States	The Fillmore
April 6	Minneapolis	United States	The Fillmore
April 7	Madison	United States	The Orpheum Theater
April 8	Chicago	United States	The Riviera Theater
April 10	Nashville	United States	Ryman Auditorium
April 11	Atlanta	United States	Tabernacle
April 12	Orlando	United States	House of Blues
April 14	Raleigh	United States	The Ritz
April 15	Silver Springs	United States	The Fillmore
April 16	Philadelphia	United States	The Fillmore
April 19	Toronto	Canada	History
April 21	Boston	United States	MGM Music Hall at Fenway
June 28	Des Plaines	United States	Des Plaines Theater
September 5	Santa Ana	United States	The Observatory
September 7	San Diego	United States	Humphrey's by The Bay
September 8	Los Angeles	United States	Greek Theater
September 14	Houston	United States	House of Blues
September 16	Austin	United States	ACL Live
September 17	San Antonio	United States	Aztec Theater
September 18	Dallas	United States	House of Blues
September 19	Tulsa	United States	Cain's Ballroom

- Vibrant Tour (2024)
- Silver Deliverer Tour (2025)

Date (2025)	City	Country	Venue
September 19	Los Angeles	United States	The Ford
September 20	Los Angeles	United States	The Ford
September 25	Portland	United States	Arlene Schnitzer Music Hall
September 26	Seattle	United States	The Paramount Theater
September 27	Vancouver	Canada	Vogue Theatre
September 30	Boise	United States	Knitting Factory
October 1	Salt Lake City	United States	The Union
October 2	Denver	United States	Ogden Theater
October 4	Minneapolis	United States	Skyway Theater
October 5	Kansas City	United States	The Midland Theater
October 7	St. Louis	United States	The Factory
October 8	Fort Wayne	United States	Clyde Theater
October 10	Chicago	United States	The Salt Shed
October 11	Columbus	United States	KEMBA Live!
October 12	Royal Oak	United States	Royal Oak Music Theater
October 14	Pittsburgh	United States	Stage AE
October 15	Toronto	Canada	Massey Hall
October 17	New York City	United States	Terminal 5
October 19	Boston	United States	Roadrunner
October 21	Philadelphia	United States	Franklin Music Hall
October 22	Washington, D.C.	United States	The Anthem
October 24	Charlotte	United States	Ovens Auditorium
October 25	Jacksonville	United States	FIVE
October 26	Orlando	United States	Hard Rock Live
October 28	Pompano Beach	United States	Pompano Beach Amphitheater
October 29	Atlanta	United States	The Eastern
October 31	Houston	United States	White Oak Music Hall
November 1	Austin	United States	The Paramount Theater
November 2	Dallas	United States	The Bomb Factory
November 4	Phoenix	United States	Celebrity Theater
November 5	San Diego	United States	Humphrey's by The Bay
November 8	San Francisco	United States	The Warfield
November 9	Santa Barbara	United States	Arlington Theater

- Places to Run Tour (2026)

Supporting

- The Cheetah Girls Cheetah-licious Christmas Tour (2005)
- Best of Both Worlds Tour (2008)
- Reverie Tour (2022)
- Girls Just Wanna Have Fun Farewell Tour (2024)

== Awards and nominations ==
Year	Award	Category	Nominated work	Result
2005	Radio Disney Music Awards	Best Song You Can't Believe Your Parents Know the Words To	"Do You Believe in Magic"	Won
2005	Radio Disney Music Awards	Best TV Movie Song	"Rush"	Won
2005	Radio Disney Music Awards	Best Song to Listen to on the Way to School	"Walking on Sunshine"	Won
2006	American Music Awards	Contemporary Inspirational Artists of the Year	Into the Rush	Won
2006	Radio Disney Music Awards	Best Group Made of Brothers/Sisters	Aly & AJ	Won
2006	Radio Disney Music Awards	Best Group	Aly & AJ	Nominated
2006	Radio Disney Music Awards	Best Video That Rocks	"Chemicals React"	Nominated
2006	Radio Disney Music Awards	Best Song to Listen to While Getting Ready for School	"Rush"	Nominated
2008	Time magazine awards	10 Best Songs of 2007	"Potential Breakup Song"	9th place
2013	Popdust Awards	Best Siblings in Pop	78violet	Won
2015	Napa Film Festival	Special Jury Award (Acting in a Lounge Feature Film)	Aly & AJ in Weepah Way for Now	Won
2021	Trending: VMAs	Best Comeback Song	"Potential Breakup Song"	Won
