= Insomniatic =

Studio album by Aly & AJ
- Released: July 10, 2007
- Recorded: 2006–2007
- Genre: Electronic rock
- Length: 42:55
- Label: Hollywood
- Producers: Antonina Armato; Tim James

Aly & AJ chronology
Acoustic Hearts of Winter (2006)	Insomniatic (2007)	Ten Years (2017)

Singles from Insomniatic
- 1. "Potential Breakup Song" Released: June 26, 2007; 2. "Like Whoa" Released: March 18, 2008

Insomniatic is the third studio album by American pop rock duo Aly & AJ, released on July 10, 2007, by Hollywood Records. The album features an electronic based sound, differing from their previous pop-rock and acoustic releases, that was accented with the use of synthesizers, sampling, drum programming and vocal processing effects. The lyrical content of the album is centered heavily around heartbreak, which some critics noted for its contrast to the electronic elements presented.

Insomniatic was well received by many music critics, many of which lauded the duo for the lyrical depth and evolution. Others, however, found the composition of the album to be bland and unoriginal. The album debuted at number 15 on the Billboard 200 with sales of 39,000. Two singles were spawned from the album. The first single, "Potential Breakup Song", was released on June 26, 2007, and charted within the top 30 in several countries, including the United States where it peaked at number 17. The song was also featured on an episode of MTV's The Hills. "Like Whoa" was released as the album's second single in early 2008 and charted in the lower regions of the charts.

The album was the duo's final release with Hollywood Records. They left Hollywood in 2010 before forming their own label 78violet Music LLC.

== Background ==
MTV's The Leak section posted all 12 songs on the standard edition of the album in their entirety on July 3, 2007. The song "Blush" was excluded from the MTV.com full album stream, as well as the iTunes edition. The song "Like Whoa" was featured in an episode of MTV's The Hills, the television movie Super Sweet 16: The Movie, which starred Aly & AJ, and High School Musical 3: Senior Year. The song eventually became the album's second single.

Instrumental versions of all 12 songs are available commercially on the iTunes Store, alongside the standard 12-track album with vocals. The album's title is not actually a word ("insomniac" serves as both a noun and an adjective); the definition of Insomniatic as stated by them is "A state of mind where one becomes addicted to the deprivation of sleep caused by an epic revelation of joy." The Australian release of the album features the same cover art as the deluxe edition, aside from the "Deluxe Edition" tag. It also includes the original version of "Chemicals React" as the first track, with the rest of the standard album following.

== Composition ==
Insomniatic is primarily an electro rock album that focuses instrumentally on the usage of synthesizers, drum programming, synthesized drums, sampling, loops and vocoders, creating a synthesized sound throughout. The set encompasses numerous genres including rock, pop, electronica, new wave, and Europop. The lyrical themes of the album are centered on heartbreak and loss. The first song, "Potential Breakup Song", is composed as an electropop song that incorporates elements of electronica, electro-rock and dance in its composition. The song's lyrics describe a situation in which certain instances have led to the dissolution of a union. The title track is an electro rock number that consists of instrumentation from "striking" drums and "quick" guitar riffs. The duo, who harmonizes throughout the song, speak of the feeling derived from insomnia. "Silence" features an opening consisting of a soft percussion and the accompaniment of synthesized instruments and piano with the vocals. "Like Whoa" differs from the rest of the album in sound as it runs through an upbeat dance rhythm and electronic beats, similar to those in "Bullseye", while incorporating sounds of an amusement park ride and new wave music. "Blush" is a lite ballad that features hints of sexual tension and suggestiveness in the lyrics. "Bullseye", along with "If I Could Have You Back" and "Like or Leave It", blend 70s and 80s guitar tones with electronic beats. "Closure" is an electropop ballad that is composed of synthesizer keyboards and distorted guitars.

A deluxe edition of the album was originally scheduled to be released in North America on November 6, 2007, then on March 4, 2008, and finally on March 18 only to eventually be canceled. The six-song extended CD includes acoustic performances at the Abbey Road Studios in the UK and a remix, along with a bonus DVD that contains music videos for Aly & AJ's main singles. Early reports stated that the DVD would include Aly & AJ's "My Super Sweet 16/18 Birthday Party" episode, a review featurette of the episode, the Aly & AJ: Sister Act MTV special, and the Aly & AJ episode of MTV Cribs, but these were not included. The deluxe edition was only released on March 5, 2008, in Japan.

== Chart performance ==
The album debuted at number 15 on the Billboard 200 albums chart, selling over 39,000 copies in its first week, becoming Aly & AJ's highest debut to date. Insomniatic remained on the charts for 18 weeks in total, dropping out after the fourteenth week, only to re-enter again six weeks later. Insomniatic has sold 700,000 copies domestically and has sold more than 2 million copies worldwide.

== Critical reception ==
Professional ratings
Review scores
Source	Rating
AllMusic	2.5/5 stars
Billboard	(positive)
TheCelebrityCafe.com	(positive)
Famoso Magazine	3/5 stars
The Guardian	4/5 stars
Jesus Freak Hideout	3.5/5 stars
Robert Christgau	(choice cut)
stv.tv	4/5 stars
Tommy2.net	3/4 stars

Kathi Kamen Goldmark of Common Sense Media gave the album four out of five stars, praising the duo's vocals and the "gentle undertone of self-esteem and standing up for yourself in relationships" as "refreshing". She further commented that the album was "better written than their first album" and that "the highs of flirtation, the confusion that comes with being caught in the undertow of sexual attraction while taking care of yourself and setting limits, and the sadness and disappointment of breaking up" were "all described in well-constructed songs containing G-rated imagery." Sari N. Kent of TheCelebrityCafe wrote positively about the album, writing in her review that the album "will make listeners jump up and take notice of this harmonic twosome. Their active beats will infect listeners' ears and make them want to dance whether they want to or not." Logan Leasure of Jesus Freak Hideout wrote that the album "offers some positive content through brokenness, but this is not an album worth presenting to someone looking for Christ." Caroline Sullivan of The Guardian rated the album an A, praising "the effect of which is to leave the listener suspended between hyped-up delight and despair at the micro-produced perfection of it all" and the songwriting/production team for crafting "lush, assertive little symphonies with massive hooklines that make the most of the sisters' Britneyish breathiness." T2 of Tommy2.Net gave Insomniatic a three out of four star rating, praising the evolution of lyrics and sound present by the Michalka sisters. Chuck Eddy of Billboard in a positive review of the album described Insomniatic as "an endlessly ambitious yet endlessly effervescent confessional pop-rock breakup album that deserves to carry them far beyond their teen pop base."

USA Today stated: "for Insomniatic, the sisters had a hand in writing every song. The single 'Potential Breakup Song' sounds somewhat like Del Shannon's 'Runaway' run through a processor, but there's a lot more going musically than on your average teen-pop album." Fraser McAlpine of BBC Radio stated: "Aly and AJ's previous album was rock-pop; some of it light and bubbly, some of it bordering on heaviness. Staccato, often angry pop but still definitely pop. Their second offering, 'Insomniatic,' with this as the lead single seems to have kept the staccato and the venom but added more layers of pop, to create something that sounds like My Chemical Romance going through a blender with some soft-hearted Angry Girl Music." McAlpine described "Potential Breakup Song" as having "the most danceable mental breakdown I've heard in quite some time."

== Release and promotion ==
The album was released on July 10, 2007, in the United States, on October 22, 2007, in the United Kingdom and Italy — with a new cover art — and ultimately in Singapore in April 2008. An enhanced Deluxe Edition was released in Japan on March 5, 2008. The cover of the Deluxe Edition (aside from the "deluxe edition" tag) was used for an Australian release on March 15, 2008. All other regions use the standard edition cover, featuring sisters and full moon behind them.

=== Promotion ===
United States

- The sisters sang an edit of the lead single from Insomniatic, "Potential Breakup Song", on Live with Regis & Kelly on July 4, 2007, and again on The View on September 3, 2007.
- On July 9, 2007, both sisters were on The Early Show where they did a short interview.
- On August 1, 2007, both sisters were on MTV's Total Request Live to take viewers backstage at one of their concert stops. In the week of August 26, the girls hosted and co-hosted the show again.
- The video for "Potential Breakup Song" premiered on Disney Channel in August 2007.
- They performed songs from Insomniatic with Miley Cyrus as the supporting act replacing the Jonas Brothers. Soon after they were replaced by Everlife because of AJ's busy schedule, filming her first solo role in The Lovely Bones.

United Kingdom

- The girls performed "Potential Breakup Song" near the London Eye to promote the UK release in October.
- On October 3, 2007, Aly & AJ performed "Potential Breakup Song" on This Morning, a British morning show.
- On October 10, 2007, the sisters performed "Potential Breakup Song" and a version of "Like Whoa" with an extended "Relax" dance break at G-A-Y, a London-based nightclub.
- They performed with UK band McFly in London as a supporting act on the tour.
- They were also featured on a Saturday morning television show called TMi on BBC Television.

=== Tours ===
After they were supporting act for Miley Cyrus on her Best of Both Worlds Tour, sisters also promoted the album with two tours in 2008: Insomniatic Tour and Mini Summer Tour.

== Singles ==
- "Potential Breakup Song" was released as the lead single from the album on May 24, 2007, in Canada, on June 26 in United States and on October 8 in United Kingdom. It peaked at number seventeen on US Billboard Hot 100, also peaking at number seventy-two in Canada and number twenty-two in the UK.
- "Like Whoa" was released as the second and final single from the album on March 18, 2008, in United States. Its UK release was cancelled. It peaked at number sixty-three on US Billboard Hot 100, number sixty-six in Canada and number ninety-two in Australia.

== Track listing ==
Insomniatic – Standard edition
No.	Title	Writer(s)	Length
1.	"Potential Breakup Song"	Aly Michalka; AJ Michalka; Antonina Armato; Tim James	3:39
2.	"Bullseye"	Michalka; Michalka; Armato; James	3:02
3.	"Closure"	Michalka; Michalka; Armato; James	2:50
4.	"Division"	Michalka; Michalka; Armato; James	3:44
5.	"Like It or Leave It"	Michalka; Michalka; Armato; James	3:17
6.	"Like Whoa"	Michalka; Michalka; Armato; James	2:31
7.	"Insomniatic"	Michalka; Michalka	2:47
8.	"Silence"	Michalka; Michalka; Carrie Michalka	3:33
9.	"If I Could Have You Back"	Michalka; Michalka; Dan Wilson	2:53
10.	"Blush^{[b]}"	Michalka; Michalka	3:33
11.	"Flattery"	Michalka; Michalka; Armato; James	4:08
12.	"I'm Here"	Michalka; Michalka	4:06
13.	"Chemicals React" (Remix)	Michalka; Michalka; Armato; James	2:55

Insomniatic – Walmart edition (bonus track)
No.	Title	Writer(s)	Length
14.	"Careful with Words"	Michalka; Michalka	2:20

Insomniatic – Target and Japanese edition (bonus track)
No.	Title	Writer(s)	Length
14.	"Tears"	Michalka; Michalka; Michalka	2:05

Insomniatic – Deluxe edition
No.	Title	Writer(s)	Length
10.	"Flattery"		4:08
11.	"I'm Here"		4:06
12.	"Chemicals React" (Remix)		2:55
13.	"Careful with Words"		2:20
14.	"Tears"		2:05
15.	"Blush"		3:33
16.	"Potential Breakup Song" (Hi-Grand Up Remix Radio Edit)		3:47
17.	"Potential Breakup Song" (Abbey Road Sessions)		3:13
18.	"Bullseye" (Abbey Road Sessions)		3:15
19.	"Closure" (Abbey Road Sessions)		2:57
20.	"÷^{[a]}" (Abbey Road Sessions)		3:50
21.	"Black Horse and the Cherry Tree" (Abbey Road Sessions) (KT Tunstall cover)	KT Tunstall	2:51

Insomniatic – Deluxe edition DVD
No.	Title	Director	Length
1.	"Rush" (music video)	Marc Webb
2.	"No One" (music video)
3.	"Chemicals React" (music video)	Chris Applebaum
4.	"Potential Breakup Song" (music video)	Chris Applebaum
5.	"Like Whoa" (music video)	Scott Speer

- ^{^[a]} Pronounced Division.
- ^{^b} "Blush" was only included on first CD pressings of the album.
- The Target edition also comes with two digital ringtone downloads of "Potential Breakup Song" and "Bullseye".

== Charts ==
Chart (2007)	Peak position
Japanese Albums (Oricon)	90
Scottish Albums (Official Charts)	66
UK Albums (Official Charts)	72
US Billboard 200	15

== Release history ==
Region	Date	Edition	Format
North America	July 10, 2007	Standard	CD; digital download
North America	July 10, 2007	Instrumental	Digital download
Europe	October 22, 2007	Standard	CD; digital download
Japan	November 7, 2007	Standard	CD; digital download
Japan	March 5, 2008	Deluxe	CD; digital download
Australia	March 18, 2008	Standard	CD; digital download
