= Potential Breakup Song =

2007 single by Aly & AJ

Single by Aly & AJ

from the album Insomniatic
- B-side: "Careful with Words"
- Released: June 26, 2007
- Recorded: 2006
- Genre: Pop rock; synth-pop; electronic rock
- Length: 3:39
- Label: Hollywood
- Songwriters: Aly Michalka; AJ Michalka; Antonina Armato; Tim James
- Producers: Antonina Armato; Tim James

Aly & AJ singles chronology
"Greatest Time of Year" (2006)	"Potential Breakup Song" (2007)	"Like Whoa" (2008)

Music video
- Potential Breakup Song on YouTube

"Potential Breakup Song" is a song co-written and performed by pop rock duo Aly & AJ and is the first single from their third studio album, Insomniatic. It was released on June 26, 2007, going on to top many video countdowns, and becoming Aly & AJ's most successful single to date. In November 2020, the song saw a resurgence in popularity due to its widespread use on the app TikTok, receiving over 26 million viewers for the month.

The song was certified platinum by the RIAA for sales over 1,000,000 copies. Time magazine ranked "Potential Breakup Song" the ninth-best song of 2007. The song received generally positive reviews from other music critics as well, many praising its lyrical content and its maturity, as well as the "adventurous" synth-based production.

In December 2020, the duo released a re-recording of the song with explicit lyrics.

== Background and composition ==
There are two versions of this song played on the radio. One is the official album version, which is played on mainstream radio, while a version with all the violence and sexual innuendo removed is played on Radio Disney. In the Radio Disney chorus, when Aly and AJ sing, "gettin' me", the edited version adds a to between gettin' and me. Also, in the spoken word middle-eight, when Aly sings, "without me, you're gonna die," die is replaced with cry.

A departure from the duo's earlier guitar-based sound, "Potential Breakup Song" is primarily a pop song. It makes heavy use of vocal processing effects during the verses; and its lyrical content is, as the title states, about a break-up, mentioning that "our album needs just one". According to Musicnotes.com, the song is composed in the key of F♯ minor, has a tempo "moderately fast," a vocal range of F♯3–D5, and the time signature is 4/4 common time.

== Release ==
The single was released on Radio Disney on May 12, 2007, containing the edited lyrics rather than the official version of the single. The song was made available for sale on the US iTunes Store on June 26, 2007, along with a pre-order offer for their second studio album, Insomniatic.

The single was released digitally in the UK on October 1, 2007, followed by a physical CD single release on October 8. The album followed two weeks later on October 22. The song served as the group's second UK single when it was released in October, after their debut UK single, "Chemicals React" failed to chart in the UK in May 2007. Also, the bonus track for the United States Wal-Mart collector's edition "Careful With Words" serves as the B-side of the CD single in the United Kingdom.

After a resurgence in popularity of the song due to widespread use on TikTok, and requests from fans, the duo released a re-recording of the song as a promotional single on December 29, 2020. The new recording has reworked vocals and production, with some changes in the lyrics, such as replacing "stupid birthday" with "fucking birthday" that had previously been performed live. The duo dedicated the song to "breaking up" with 2020.

== Critical reception ==
Upon its release, "Potential Breakup Song" has received generally positive reviews from critics. Digital Spy said that, "by Disney Channel standards at least, 'Potential Breakup Song' is fairly adventurous, riding its bassline and tango-inflected rhythm track to a chipper, synth-fueled chorus." The Celebrity Café said that the song "has an electronica-like melody to it that is perfect to be played in listeners' dance clubs." Tommy2.Net said that "several tracks [on the Insomniatic album] point toward synth rock by the use of samples, loops and vocal processing including the lead single, 'Potential Breakup Song,' which proves to be a good barometer for the direction they're heading." BBC Music said that they "already introduced 'Potential Breakup Song' on Back of the Sofa Tunes pt.2, after I bullied Steve P into listening to it until the poor lad was quite overcome by its brilliance and subsequently forced to bully Fraser into covering it." Time voted it the ninth-best song of the year, describing it as "winking pop that doesn't skimp on the hook ... or the emotion."

== Music video ==
The music video, directed by Chris Applebaum, was shot on May 17, 2007, and was premiered on TRL on June 18, 2007. It debuted at number ten on TRL on August 21, 2007, and peaked at number six on August 28, 2007. On July 18, 2007, the video reached number one on AOL Music's Top 10 Video Countdown.

The video shows Aly and AJ singing the song on a gray set dressed in black, and oftentimes acting like DJ's assembling sets of drum machines. At the end of the video, the black ink floating in the air stains a blank paper, forming the group's new logo, as well as the sequence of letters XOXO. It also includes the web address to PotentialBreakup.com.

In the Disney Channel version of the video, the Radio Disney lyrics are used. The music video was sometimes shown on Nickelodeon Asia.

== Chart performance ==
"Potential Breakup Song" debuted at number 77 on the US Billboard Hot 100 on July 14, 2007. The song peaked at number 17, becoming the group's best performing single on the Hot 100. As the song began to fall down the chart, dropping to number 50 about a month after its peak, it recovered and bounced back up to number 41 after Aly and AJ co-hosted MTV's TRL for one week. As of March 2009, the song has sold over 1,000,000 digital downloads in the United States, enabling it to be certified Platinum by the RIAA.

In the United Kingdom, the single was released to download on October 1, 2007, and debuted at number 33 on the UK Singles Chart. Following the release of the physical CD, the song later peaked at number 22 in Britain.

== Uses in pop culture ==
- "Potential Breakup Song" is played in the video games Thrillville: Off the Rails and Boogie Superstar.
- "Potential Breakup Song" is played in episode two of The Miley and Mandy Show.
- "Potential Breakup Song" is played in the ending credits for the Japanese horror film X-Cross.
- "Potential Breakup Song" is played in episode six of the third season of The Hills.

== Track listing ==
CD single and digital download
No.	Title	Writer(s)	Length
1.	"Potential Breakup Song (Radio Disney edit)"	Alyson Michalka; Amanda Michalka; Antonina Armato; Tim James	3:39
2.	"Careful with Words"	Al. Michalka; Am. Michalka	2:20
Total length:			5:59

== Charts ==
=== Weekly charts ===
Weekly chart performance for "Potential Breakup Song"
Chart (2007–2008)	Peak position
Canada Hot 100 (Billboard)	72
European Hot 100 Singles (Billboard)	65
Ireland (IRMA)	16
Netherlands (Single Top 100)	83
Norway (VG-lista)	18
Russia Airplay (TopHit)	17
Scottish Singles Sales (Official Charts)	31
UK Singles (Official Charts)	22
US Billboard Hot 100	17
Venezuela Pop Rock (Record Report)	3

Weekly chart performance for "Potential Breakup Song (2020)"
Chart (2021)	Peak position
US Digital Song Sales (Billboard)	8

=== Year-end charts ===
Year-end chart performance for "Potential Breakup Song"
Chart (2008)	Peak position
Russia Airplay (TopHit)	60

=== Decade-end charts ===
Decade-end chart performance for "Potential Breakup Song"
Chart (2000–2009)	Position
Russia Airplay (TopHit)	131

== Certifications ==
Region	Certification	Certified units/sales
United Kingdom (BPI)	Silver	200,000^{‡}
United States (RIAA)	2× Platinum	2,000,000^{‡}
^{‡} Sales+streaming figures based on certification alone.

== Release history ==
Date	Region	Format	Version	Label
May 12, 2007	United States	Radio Disney	Original	Hollywood
June 26, 2007	United States	Mainstream radio	Original	Hollywood
June 26, 2007	United States	Digital download	Original	Hollywood
October 1, 2007	United Kingdom	Digital download	Original	EMI
October 8, 2007	United Kingdom	CD single	Original	EMI
December 29, 2020	Various	Digital download; streaming; 7” Vinyl	Explicit	Self-released

== Ami Suzuki version ==
"Potential Breakup Song"

Single by Ami Suzuki

from the album Dolce
- Language: Japanese
- B-side: "Feel the Beat"
- Released: November 28, 2007
- Genre: J-pop; house
- Length: 3:57
- Label: Avex Trax
- Songwriters: Alyson Michalka; Amanda Michalka; Antonina Armato; Tim James; Fumihito Morita; Ami Suzuki
- Producer: Sugiurumn

Ami Suzuki singles chronology
"Free Free/Super Music Maker" (2007)	"Potential Breakup Song" (2007)	"One" (2008)

Music video
- Potential Breakup Song on YouTube

"Potential Breakup Song" was covered by Japanese singer Ami Suzuki under the label Avex Trax. It was released on November 28, 2007.

The song was used in the Japanese horror film X-Cross, in which Suzuki had a lead role, alongside the original Aly & AJ version. The single was produced by Japanese DJ Sugiurumn and has a stronger club feel than Aly & AJ's version.

In June 2008, it was announced that the single would be Suzuki's final "joins" single.

=== Track listing ===
All music is arranged by Sugiurumn.

CD single
No.	Title	Lyrics	Music	Length
1.	"Potential Breakup Song"	Fumihito Morita; Ami Suzuki; Alyson Michalka; Amanda Michalka; Antonina Armato; Tim James	Al. Michalka; Am. Michalka; Armato; James	3:57
2.	"Feel the Beat"	Sugiurumn	Sugiurumn	8:18
3.	"Potential Breakup Song" (Sugiurumn Remix)	Morita; Suzuki; Al. Michalka; Am. Michalka; Armato; James	Al. Michalka; Am. Michalka; Armato; James	8:15
4.	"Potential Breakup Song" (Instrumental)			3:56
Total length:				24:27

DVD
No.	Title	Length
1.	"Potential Breakup Song" (Music clip)

=== Charts ===
Oricon Sales Chart (Japan)

Release	Chart	Peak position	First week sales	Total sales
November 28, 2007	Oricon Daily Singles Chart	16	4,151	5,315
November 28, 2007	Oricon Weekly Singles Chart	34	4,151	5,315
