= Princess Protection Program =

2009 television film by Allison Liddi-Brown

- Promotional poster
- Screenplay by: Annie DeYoung
- Story by: Annie DeYoung; David Morgasen
- Directed by: Allison Liddi-Brown
- Starring: Selena Gomez; Demi Lovato; Nicholas Braun; Molly Hagan; Johnny Ray Rodriguez; Jamie Chung; Samantha Droke; Robert Adamson; Kevin G. Schmidt; Dale Dickey; Sully Diaz; Tom Verica
- Music by: John Van Tongeren
- Country of origin: United States
- Original language: English

Production
- Producer: Danielle Weinstock
- Cinematography: David A. Makin
- Editor: Mark Conte
- Running time: 89 minutes
- Production company: Rainforest Productions

Original release
- Network: Disney Channel
- Release: June 26, 2009

Princess Protection Program is a 2009 American comedy film released as a Disney Channel Original Movie. It is directed by Allison Liddi-Brown and stars Demi Lovato and Selena Gomez. The script was written by Annie DeYoung from a story by Annie DeYoung and David Morgasen. The film premiered on June 26, 2009, in the United States on Disney Channel and was released on DVD on June 30, 2009. The film won the 2009 Teen Choice Awards for Choice Summer Movie.

== Plot ==
Princess Rosalinda María Montoya Fioré is about to be crowned queen of the small nation of Costa Luna. However, her coronation rehearsal is interrupted by General Magnus Kane, the dictator of neighboring country Costa Estrella, who invades her palace with his agents and attempts to capture the royal family and take over the country. Major Joe Mason, an agent of the Princess Protection Program (P.P.P.), a secret organization funded by royal families that looks after endangered princesses, whisks her away to safety via helicopter. Kane's agents, however, succeed in capturing her widowed mother, Queen Sofía.

While the P.P.P. is given the mission to find a way to legally remove Kane and liberate Rosalinda's kingdom, they hide her in Joe's home in Lake Monroe, Louisiana, where she meets his insecure, tomboyish teenage daughter, Carter. Carter works at the family bait shop and dreams of going to the homecoming dance with her crush, Donny, though her classmate Ed secretly has a crush on her. Rosalinda poses as "Rosie Gonzalez", Carter's cousin from Iowa. Though Carter initially treats her with hostility, she warms up to her after Rosie explains her situation, and the two become close friends. Carter teaches Rosie how to act like an average American teenager, while Rosie shows Carter how to disarm those that scorn them, especially resident mean girls Chelsea Barnes and Brooke Angels. Rosie soon becomes popular at their high school.

In an attempt to trick Rosie into exposing her location, General Kane announces plans to forcibly marry Sofía. Having learned Rosie's identity from a magazine, Brooke threatens to expose her unless she drops out of the vote for homecoming queen. Rosie reads of the pending nuptials in the magazine and tells Carter that she has decided to return home. Knowing Costa Luna is still too dangerous, Carter devises a plan to disguise herself as Rosie and use herself as bait to lure Kane into capture. Carter calls Mr. Elegante, Rosie's royal dressmaker and friend, for help with her plan. He tells Kane that Rosie will be attending the homecoming dance and plans to wear a blue dress, which he actually sends to Carter, giving Rosie a pink one. In the meantime, Rosie agrees to stay for the dance.

A group of friends, including Rosie and Carter, wear masks to the dance, helping Carter disguise herself as Rosie. According to plan, Kane and his agents mistake Carter for Rosie and lead her to Kane's helicopter. However, after winning the homecoming queen title despite Chelsea and Brooke's efforts, Rosie discovers and ruins the plan by exposing herself to Kane, insisting to Carter that it is not her fight. Luckily, P.P.P. agents, including Joe, have been waiting inside the helicopter and rescue both girls. The agents quickly apprehend Kane and his henchmen and turn them over to the international authorities. Rosie is crowned queen with Carter, Joe, Ed, Sofía, and Mr. Elegante in attendance.

== Cast ==
- Demi Lovato as Princess Rosalinda Maria Montoya Fiore / Rosie Gonzalez
- Selena Gomez as Carter Mason
- Tom Verica as Major Joe Mason
- Sully Diaz as Queen Sofía Fiore
- Johnny Ray Rodriguez as General Magnus Kane
- Jamie Chung as Chelsea Barnes
- Nicholas Braun as Ed
- Robert Adamson as Donny
- Samantha Droke as Brooke Angels
- Kevin G. Schmidt as Bull
- Talia Rothenberg as Margaret
- Molly Hagan as The Director
- Dale Dickey as Helen Digenerstet
- Ricardo Álvarez as Mr. Elegante
- Brian Tester as Principal Burkle

== Production ==
Filming took place in Puerto Rico from March 14, 2008, to April 18, 2008, and it is the first Disney Channel Original Movie filmed in Puerto Rico. School scenes as well as homecoming scenes were filmed at Colegio San Ignacio de Loyola and Colegio San José in San Juan and lake scenes were filmed at the Carraizo Lake in Trujillo Alto. Castillo Serrallés in Ponce was used for interior and exterior castle scenes while the interior courtyard of Casa de España in the Old San Juan was used for both coronation scenes.

== Promotion ==
Disney Channel promoted the film's premiere weekend by offering never-before-seen episodes of their original series' Wizards of Waverly Place and Sonny with a Chance as an online reward if viewers could correctly count the number of times the words "princess," "princesses" and "princesa" are spoken during the film and enter the correct number into a section on their website.

== Home media ==
The film was released on DVD on June 30, 2009, in the United States and was later available worldwide.

== Music ==
The film introduced two songs: a duet recorded by Lovato and Gomez called "One and the Same" and a song recorded by Mitchel Musso called "The Girl Can't Help It". Both songs were included on the compilation album Disney Channel Playlist, which was released on June 9, 2009. The film also includes the songs "Two Worlds Collide" by Lovato (featured on Lovato's debut album Don't Forget), "Saturdays and Sundays" by KSM (featured on their album Read Between the Lines) and "Ride" by Diana Page. The film's Opening scene features the song "Do What You Wanna Do" by Charline Ibrahim, Written by Eric Silver, but it was uncredited. The song "Is It Just Me" by Kari Kimmel is also featured in the film.

=== One and the Same ===
"One and the Same"

Song by Demi Lovato and Selena Gomez

from the album Disney Channel Playlist
- Released: June 9, 2009
- Recorded: 2009
- Genre: Pop rock
- Length: 3:00
- Label: Walt Disney
- Songwriters: Colleen Fitzpatrick, Michael Kotch, Dave Derby
- Producer: Mitch Allan

Music video
- "One and the Same" on YouTube

"One and the Same" is a song performed by the main actors Lovato and Gomez. The song was written by Vitamin C, Michael Kotch and Dave Derby and was produced by Mitch Allan. The song's music video was included on the DVD of the film. The song was also featured on the compilation album, Disney Channel Playlist, which was released on June 9, 2009. The music video premiered on Disney Channel on June 17.

Chart performance

The song peaked at number 82 on the US Billboard Hot 100. It has sold 336,000 digital copies, according to Nielsen SoundScan.

Charts

Chart (2009)	Peak position
US Billboard Hot 100	82

== Reception ==
On Rotten Tomatoes, the film has an approval rating of 60% based on 5 reviews. Laura Fries of Variety magazine describes the film as being "light as a summer breeze on the Louisiana bayou". Although the film does not stray far from the Disney formula, Fries also praised the film writer Annie DeYoung for providing young girls a nice message about self-esteem. Fries said the film should be a hit with the channel's target audience.

== Ratings ==
The film garnered 8.5 million viewers on its premiere, making Disney Channel the most-watched network in the time slot, with nearly double the viewers of CBS at that time.

== Awards ==
Year	Ceremony	Award	Result
2009	Teen Choice Awards	Choice Summer TV Movie	Won
2009	Teen Choice Awards	Choice Summer TV Star – Female: Selena Gomez	Won
2009	Teen Choice Awards	Choice Summer TV Star – Female: Demi Lovato	Nominated
2010	Directors Guild of America	Outstanding Directorial Achievement in a Children's Program – Allison Liddi-Brown	Won
2010	Young Artist Award	Best Performance in a TV Movie, Miniseries, or Special – Leading Young Actress: Selena Gomez	Nominated
2010	Young Artist Award	Best Performance in a TV Movie, Miniseries, or Special – Leading Young Actress: Demi Lovato	Nominated
