= Summer Nights =

Summer Nights may refer to:

- Les nuits d'été ("Summer Nights"), a song cycle by Hector Berlioz
- Summernights, a 1977 album by Silver Convention
- Summer Nights (album), by Joe Pass, 1989
- Summer Nights (EP), by Twice, 2018
- "Summer Nights" (Grease song), from the 1971 stage musical and 1978 film Grease
- "Summer Nights" (Rascal Flatts song), 2009
- "Summer Nights" (Survivor song), 1981
- "Summer Nights" (Tiësto song), 2016
- Summer Nights, a 1998 album by Stevie B, or the title song
- "Summer Nights", a song by Cassie Steele from Destructo Doll
- "Summer Nights", a song by Lauv from All 4 Nothing
- "Summer Nights", a song by Lil Rob from the album Twelve Eighteen (Pt. I)
- "Summer Nights", a song by Marianne Faithfull
- "Summer Nights", a song by Van Halen from 5150
- "Summer Nights", a song by Vanessa Amorosi from Hazardous
- Summer Nights (concert residency), by Olivia Newton-John (2014–2015)
- Summer Nights (1944 film), a German comedy film
- Summer Nights (2014 film), a French drama film

== See also ==
- Summer Knights, a 2013 mixtape by Joey Badass
- "Summer Knights", a song by Joey Badass from 1999
