= Here We Go Again (Demi Lovato album) =

2009 studio album by Demi Lovato

Studio album by Demi Lovato
- Released: July 21, 2009
- Recorded: February–April 2009
- Studios: SuperSpy (Los Angeles, California); Resonate (Burbank, California); Safe House (California); The Jungle Room (Glendale, California); Studio Wishbone (Los Angeles); The Treehouse (Studio City, California); Ocean Way (Los Angeles)
- Genres: Pop rock; pop-punk
- Length: 46:50
- Label: Hollywood
- Producers: John Fields; Gary Clark; SuperSpy; Aris Archonitis; Jeannie Lurie; Chen Neeman; Adam Watts; Adam Dodd

Demi Lovato chronology
Don't Forget (2008)	Here We Go Again (2009)	Unbroken (2011)

Singles from Here We Go Again
- 1. "Here We Go Again" Released: June 23, 2009; 2. "Remember December" Released: January 18, 2010

Here We Go Again is the second studio album by American singer Demi Lovato. It was released on July 21, 2009, through Hollywood Records. Unlike her previous album, Don't Forget (2008), Lovato did not collaborate with the Jonas Brothers, as she wanted to work with different people and give the album a personal approach. Lovato collaborated for the album with established songwriters and producers, such as E. Kidd Bogart, Gary Clark, Toby Gad, John Mayer, Jon McLaughlin, Lindy Robbins and John Fields.

Here We Go Again derives mainly from the pop rock and pop-punk genre, mixed with influences of rock, power pop, soul and pop. Lovato described the album as more "relaxed" than her previous album, while exploring more mature sounds and lyrics. Critical reception of the album was positive; critics praised Lovato for not relying on vocal manipulations and instead showing off her natural ability. Although some critics called the album catchy, others felt that it was predictable and at times too much alike Kelly Clarkson.

In the United States, Here We Go Again debuted at number one on the Billboard 200 selling 108,000 copies during its first week of release, Lovato becoming the eighth solo artist to top the chart under the age of 18. Since its release, the album has sold over 500,000 copies in the country, and has been certified Gold by the Recording Industry Association of America (RIAA). Internationally, the album peaked inside the top 40 in Australia, Brazil, Canada, Greece, Mexico, New Zealand and Spain, and was certified platinum in Brazil.

The lead single from the album, its title track, was released on June 23, 2009; it was Lovato's first solo single to reach the top 20 on the Billboard Hot 100, peaking at number 15, and has been certified platinum by the RIAA. "Remember December" was released as the second and final single in Europe on January 18, 2010. To promote the album and her debut effort, Lovato embarked on her first concert tour, entitled Demi Lovato: Live in Concert.

== Background ==
Lovato was discovered by the Disney Channel during an open call audition in her hometown of Dallas, Texas and made her debut on the short series As the Bell Rings in 2007. She subsequently auditioned for a role on the television series Jonas, but did not get the part. Instead, she received the main role in the television film Camp Rock after singing for the network executives. Later, she auditioned for a role on the series Sonny with a Chance, which she also received. Lovato enlisted the Jonas Brothers, her Camp Rock co-stars, to work with them on her debut studio album, Don't Forget (2008). The writing began during filming of Camp Rock in 2007 and continued on the band's Look Me in the Eyes Tour in 2008. Lovato wanted to establish herself as a musician with the album, and not being known as just "the person from Camp Rock". She said that her goal was to have fun on the album and that she would tackle deeper themes in her sophomore effort.

The album was released in September 2008 and debuted at number two on the Billboard 200 chart. Lovato recalled the experience, "It was like, O.K., you've done it. You're no longer just succeeding because you're in a movie with the Jonas Brothers. These people bought your music for you." Later in February 2009, Lovato's first headlining sitcom, Sonny with a Chance, premiered on Disney Channel. Don't Forget was certified Gold by the Recording Industry Association of America (RIAA) and spawned three singles, "Get Back", "La La Land" and its title track "Don't Forget". In January 2009, Lovato announced to MTV News that she had already begun writing songs for her second studio album, as well as revealing its approach: "It's going to take a different sound, so hopefully it goes over well. I sing a lot of rock, but this time I want to do more John Mayer-ish type of songs. Hopefully I can write with people like him. I love his music — it would be amazing."

== Development ==
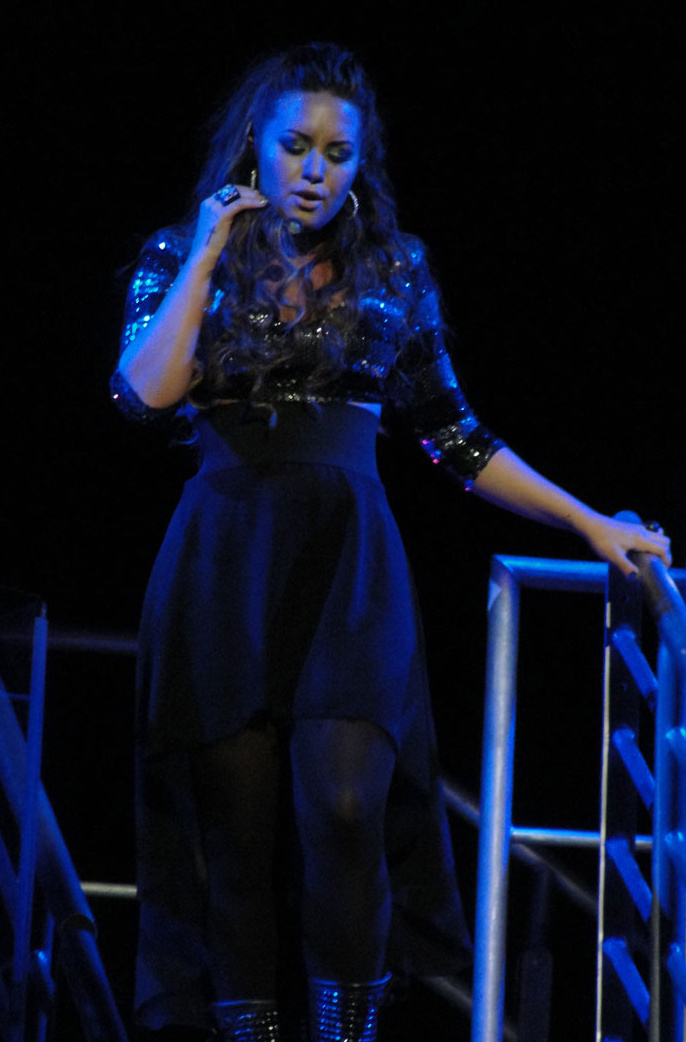
Lovato performing "Got Dynamite" during A Special Night with Demi Lovato

In February 2009, Lovato started to work on and record her second album, right after filming the first season of Sonny with a Chance. In April 2009, Lovato explained about the album's process and collaborating with songwriters from the album including Jon McLaughlin and The Academy Is... lead singer William Beckett. According to Lovato, the album's writing process was nearly finished in just two weeks, noting that she "basically went from full time acting mode to full time album mode". As she wanted to accomplish more "John Mayer-ish type of songs", she contacted Mayer's management in order to collaborate with him, citing him as one of her biggest musical influences. Mayer accepted the offer, of which Lovato said, "I was completely shocked [that he said yes]. It was more of a pipe dream. I didn't ever think it would be a reality, but it came true. He was taking a chance on working with a younger artist in the pop realm." The two wrote three songs together, "World of Chances", "Love is the Answer" and "Shut Up and Love Me". Lovato said that it was intimidating to work with him as she was worried that he would not like her lyrics, and she would get "super excited" whenever he complimented her. "World of Chances", the first song Lovato and Mayer wrote, was the only of these songs to make the album's final cut. The song was inspired by Lovato's first experience of love and heartbreak.

Lovato collaborated with Beckett on a song titled "For the Love of a Daughter". Although not planning to write a personal song, a "really long talk" with Beckett resulted in the song being written. The song chronicles Lovato's relationship with her estranged birth father, who left the family when she was two years old. In the song, she pleads with her father to "put the bottle down" and questions him: "How could you put your hands on the ones that you swore you loved?" The song was set to appear on the album, but Lovato and her management felt of the song's subject would be too much for her young audience and later was removed from the album. In an interview with Women's Wear Daily, she explained: "When I took a step back, I realized I wouldn't like those subjects being talked about in somebody else's home, with a seven-year-old and her mom." Several other "emotional" songs were also put on hold. The song later appeared on her third studio album Unbroken released in September 2011, when Lovato had left Disney Channel.

Unlike her first studio album, Don't Forget, Lovato did not collaborate with the Jonas Brothers on Here We Go Again as she wanted to see what her sound would be like without their input. "They were the only people I'd ever written with. Once I wrote with different people, I wanted to go with that", she told the New York Daily News. She said that her first album was "very Jonas" and that Here We Go Again is "a little bit more like what's coming from my heart. It's more me." However, Lovato did work with Nick Jonas on the song "Stop the World". The majority of the album was produced by John Fields, who also handled production on Don't Forget. Other tracks were produced by SuperSpy, Gary Clark, Andy Dodd and Adam Watts. "Catch Me" is the only song on the album for which Lovato received sole writing credit. In an interview with The New York Times, she revealed that she wrote it in her room and that it means more to her than the rest of the album.

== Composition ==
"Got Dynamite"
A sample of "Got Dynamite", featuring pop punk riffs and "violent" lyrics in which Lovato invites a boy to break down her defenses. The track was named the album's best by several critics.

"Remember December"
A sample of "Remember December", which diverges from Lovato's usual pop rock sound into more prominent power pop and synthpop.

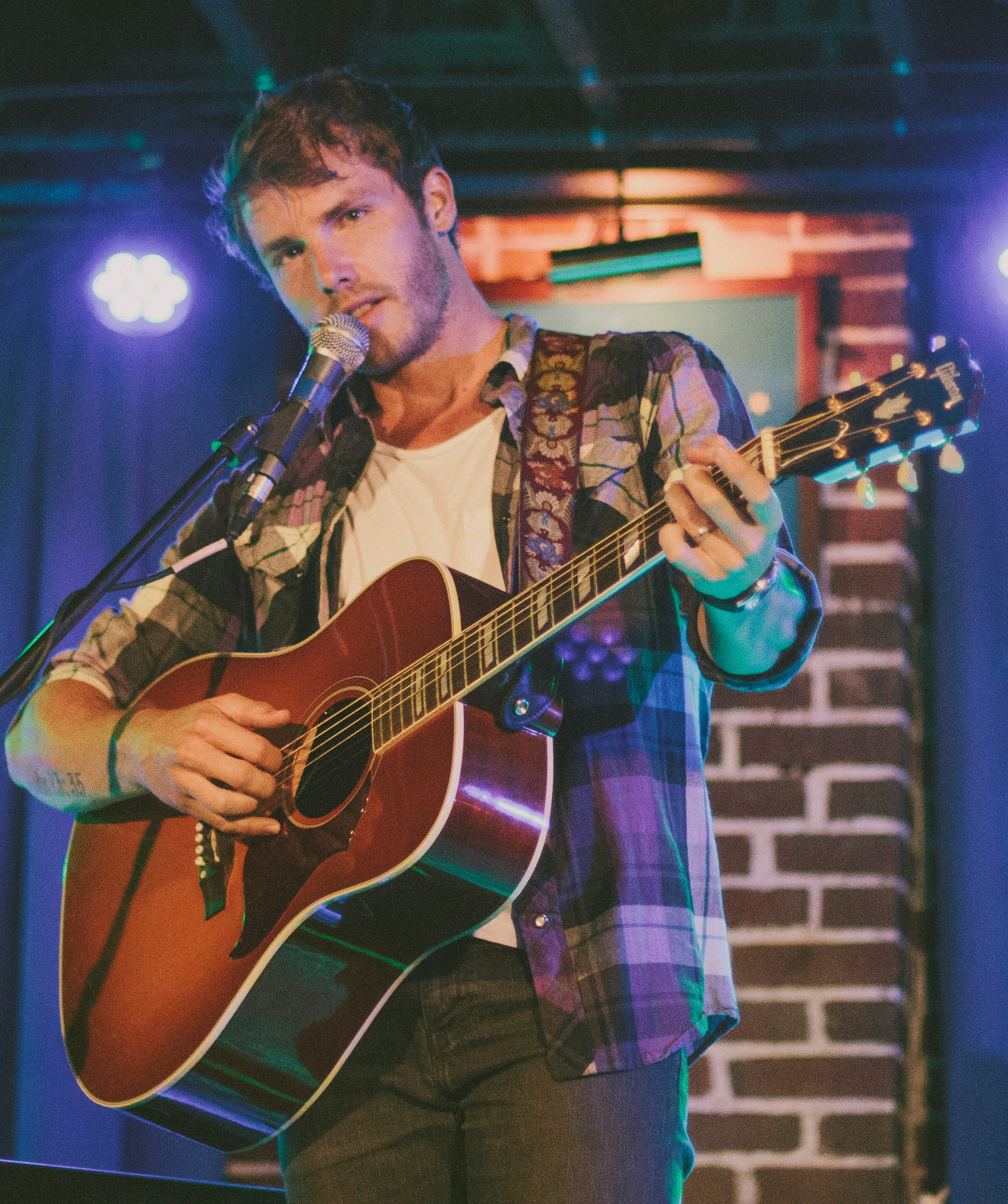
American pop rock singer Jon McLaughlin (pictured) was one of the many collaborators worked on the album.

Here We Go Again explores more mature sounds than Don't Forget, with Lovato describing the project as "more relaxed and more mature" with a "soulful edge". The lyrics are more personal than on her debut album as most of it was inspired by her experiences of love and heartbreak. She stated that the album does not hold a particular theme as she wanted the songs to be "just more mature, more of me". The album derives mainly from the genre of pop rock and pop-punk, while containing rock, power pop, soul and pop influences. Speaking to New York Daily News, Lovato said that the album's musical style includes "less rock and more mellow stuff", with a twist of R&B. "Here We Go Again" is the first track of the album was written and produced by SuperSpy. The lyrics of the song chronicle Lovato's on-off relationship with an indecisive boy, singing that "Something about you is so addictive". "Solo", the second track, was co-written by Lovato and produced by John Fields. The track is a breakup song with lyrics about self-respect. "U Got Nothin' on Me", another SuperSpy production, includes influences of 1980s glam metal, in this song, Lovato reminisces a summer romance that took a tumble which takes a toll on their relationship, but in the end, she realize she's fine on her own.

"Falling Over Me" was co-written by Lovato and Jon McLaughlin and produced by Fields. The song features a "hypnotic" bassline and lyrics about Lovato praying that her crush will notice her affection: "I'm hoping, I'm waiting, I'm praying you are the one". According to Margaret Wappler of Los Angeles Times, Lovato's vocals in the song balance "delicacy and force". On the fifth track, "Quiet", Lovato longs for a "communication breakthrough" in an awkward relationship, complaining that "It's too quiet in here". "Catch Me" is an acoustic ballad with a stripped-down production, written by Lovato herself. The song speaks of an unhealthy love connection, with Lovato going on even though she knows "how badly this will hurt me". The seventh track, "Every Time You Lie", is a song with jazz influences and a "jaunty '70s vibe". Kerri Mason of Billboard commented that the song "swings like Maroon 5's brand of radio soul". The song tells about self-respect and not putting up with lies in a relationship. "Got Dynamite" was written by Gary Clark, E. Kidd Bogart and Victoria Horn and produced by Clark. The song features "ricocheting" synthesizers and a scattering pop punk riff. The lyrics use "violent metaphors" as invitations for a boy to "blow up" Lovato's defenses, with lines such as "Log in and try to hack me" and "Kick senseless, my defenses".

The ninth track, "Stop the World", was co-written by Lovato and Nick Jonas about falling in love with someone, but "people don't want you to". The song includes a reference to the infamous criminal couple Bonnie and Clyde: "Like Bonnie and Clyde, let's find a ride." Lovato wrote the album's tenth track, "World of Chances", with John Mayer. According to Allison Stewart of The Washington Post, the ballad showcases the "rough grain" of Lovato's voice. The song tells about a girl giving a boy she loves chances to fix their relationship but keeps messing up. "Remember December" diverges from Lovato's usual pop rock sound into more prominent power pop and synthpop with "a bit of techno". In the song, she reminisces about a winter romance: "I remember us together / With a promise of forever." The twelfth and final track "Everything You're Not" was co-written by Toby Gad, Lindy Robbins and Lovato. The lyrics chronicle self-respect as Lovato sings "I want a gentleman who treats me like a queen/I need respect, I need love/Nothing in between." The first bonus track of the album, "Gift of a Friend", was co-written and produced by Adam Watts and Andy Dodd. The song is about not being able to "pursue our aspirations or deal with disappointments" without friends. The second bonus track, "So Far, So Great", was written and produced by Aris Archontis, Jeannie Lurie and Chen Neeman and served as the theme song of Sonny with a Chance. The "stomping" power pop song is about chasing your dreams.

== Promotion ==
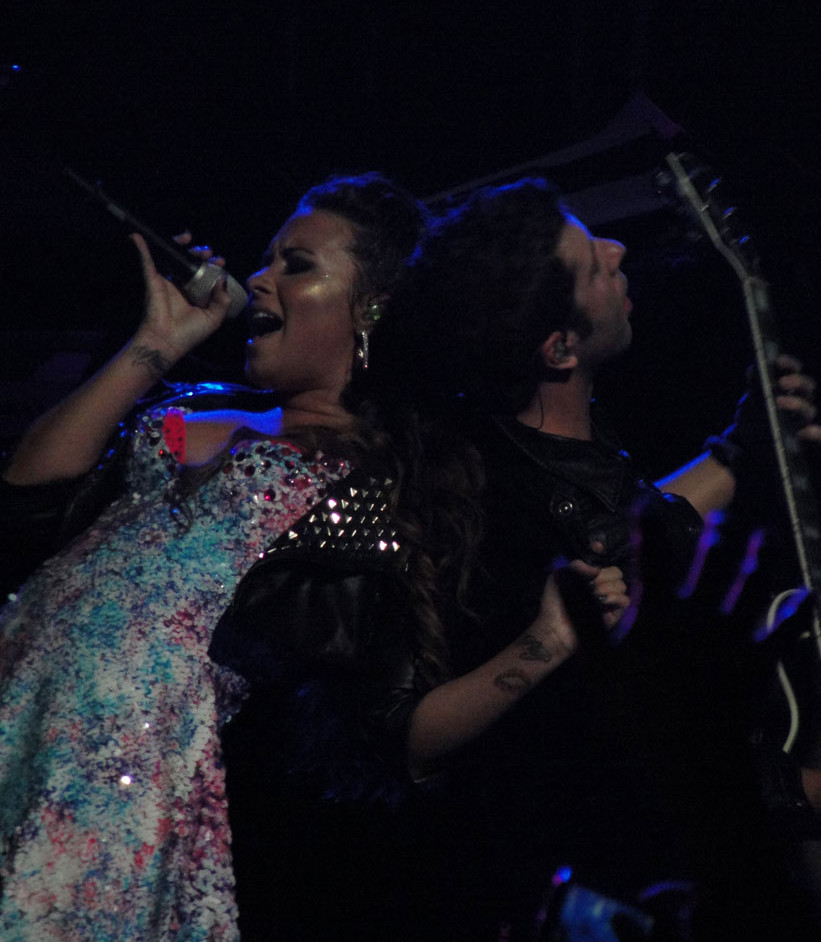
Lovato performing the title track during A Special Night with Demi Lovato

Radio Disney presented the world premiere of Here We Go Again on July 18, 2009, during the programming Planet Premiere, where Lovato was interviewed by host Ernest "Ernie D" Martinez. The album was replayed on the station the next day, and available for streaming on Radio Disney's website from July 18 through July 24, 2009. On July 17, 2009, Lovato appeared on The Tonight Show with Conan O'Brien to perform the album's title track. On July 23, she performed the single alongside the album cut "Catch Me" on Good Morning America, while performing the single only on Late Night with Jimmy Fallon and The View later the same day. To promote the album's UK release, Lovato appeared on radio BBC Switch and logged into Habbo Hotel to chat with her British fans in January 2010. She later performed "Remember December" on The Alan Titchmarsh Show on January 29, 2010. She was also interviewed on British television programs such as Blue Peter, Daily Fix Chart Show, Live from Studio Five, Freshly Squeezed and T4.

To promote the album, Lovato embarked on her concert tour, Demi Lovato: Live in Concert. The tour began on June 21, 2009, in Hartford, Connecticut and previewed new songs from Here We Go Again, including "Remember December", "Stop the World" and "U Got Nothin' on Me". It was confirmed on April 15, 2009, that David Archuleta would serve as the tour's opening act, with singer Jordan Pruitt and girl group KSM joining on select dates. Lovato announced the collaboration with Archuleta on her Myspace blog, where she also wrote, "I'm so excited about headlining my own tour. I love life on the road. I'm in a different city every night, and it never gets old." Tickets for the tour went on sale on April 25, 2009, but a special pre-sale offer was made available through Lovato's newly launched official fan club on April 15. The tour was produced by AEG Live and sponsored by AT&T and Choice Hotels.

=== Singles ===
"Here We Go Again" was released as the album's lead single on June 23, 2009, via digital download. The song made its debut at number 59 on the Billboard Hot 100 and managed to peak at number 15, becoming Lovato's highest peaking solo single at the time. Elsewhere, the song peaked at number 68 on the Canadian Hot 100 and 38 in New Zealand. Critical reception of the song was generally positive, with critics comparing it to Kelly Clarkson. The music video was directed by Brendan Malloy and Tim Wheeler. The song has sold over 820,000 copies and was certified Platinum in the United States.

"Remember December" was released on January 18, 2010, only in Europe, as the second and final single from the album. It wasn't released in North America. The song peaked at number 80 on the UK Singles Chart and received generally positive reviews from critics, who praised its hook and chorus. "Remember December" was directed by Tim Wheeler and features guest appearances from Lovato's female co-stars in their upcoming television film Camp Rock 2: The Final Jam. Instead of having a love interest in the video, Lovato chose to give it a girl empowerment theme, saying that it is about "being fierce" and "taking control as a girl".

== Critical reception ==
Professional ratings
Aggregate scores
Source	Rating
Metacritic	65/100
Review scores
Source	Rating
Allmusic	3.5/5 stars
The Arizona Republic	3.5/5 stars
Billboard	favorable
The Buffalo News	2.5/4 stars
Entertainment Weekly	B−
Houston Chronicle	3/5 stars
Los Angeles Times	3/5 stars
PopMatters	5/10
Rolling Stone	3/5 stars

At Metacritic, which assigns a normalized rating out of 100 to reviews from mainstream publications, the album received an average score of 65, based on six reviews, indicating "generally favorable reviews". Margaret Wappler of Los Angeles Times rated the album three stars out of five and noted the Kelly Clarkson influences, writing that "For the bulk of the album, Lovato channels a witty, pouty ingenue in high heels who's not afraid to call the shots, especially after a good cry." Rating the album three and a half stars, Stephen Thomas Erlewine of Allmusic noted the album's "mature veneer" and the "subtle shift buried underneath the relentlessly cheerful Radio Disney production and Lovato's irrepressible spunk", writing that "Both sonic characteristics tend to camouflage Demi's biggest moves away from teen pop." Erlewine called the album "Not quite as much fun [as Don't Forget], but still fun". The Arizona Republic critic Ed Masley gave the album three and a half stars and recommended it for power pop fans.

Entertainment Weekly's Simon Vozick-Levinson graded the album B− and praised the "hard-edged" tracks such as "Got Dynamite", calling them suggestions of "a direction that might set her apart in years to come". Houston Chronicle critic Joey Guerra rated the album three stars and wrote: "Despite the Disney machine's presence, Here We Go Again doesn't rely too heavily on 'tween trends, instead relying on Lovato's penchant for rock-drama and teaming her with a slew of older, established acts." Kerri Mason of Billboard praised the album for not relying heavily on production and Auto-Tune, calling Lovato "a natural talent who could really take flight after outgrowing Disney". Mason wrote that the album includes "quiet surprises" and potential hits, particularly praising the title track and "Catch Me". Jeff Miers from The Buffalo News rated Here We Go Again two and a half stars out of four, writing: "Unlike so many of her Disney-fied peers, Lovato can really sing, and part of what makes her sophomore effort appealing is the lack of in-studio vocal manipulation." Miers wrote that it is "refreshing" that Lovato does not need Auto-Tune "to mask any lack of natural ability". He concluded by calling the album "safe and pretty predictable, but also incredibly catchy".

Allison Stewart of The Washington Post referred the album to as a "smart, bristly, busy sophomore disc", writing that "Too much of it apes Avril Lavigne, with the standard shouted choruses and hiccupped verses that are beginning to sound very '03." Stewart named "Every Time You Lie" and "World of Chances" as "direction signs pointing to a much more interesting career". Awarding the album five out of ten points, Cody Miller of PopMatters was mixed in his review and said that Lovato "desperately wants to be Kelly Clarkson", writing "Lovato can't work miracles with mediocre pop songs like Clarkson, but the young singer-actress has a bigger range than any of her contemporaries, and a better sense of on-record charisma." Miller was mixed regarding album's content, saying that "there's nothing that really separates the tracks from each other. Most of the album's up-tempo numbers just blend together." He concluded his review: "Here We Go Again isn't perfect by any means, and when compared to someone like Clarkson or Pink, it's obvious the young singer has lots of work ahead of her if she wants to truly cement herself as a serious, viable pop/rock artist outside of the Disney mold. But given the context, Here We Go Again is certainly enjoyable to some scale." Rolling Stone gave the album 3 stars out of five, saying "Lovato has chops and spunk akin to a fellow Texas pop singer, though her voice doesn't churn with Kelly Clarkson's gutsy heart yet."

== Commercial performance ==
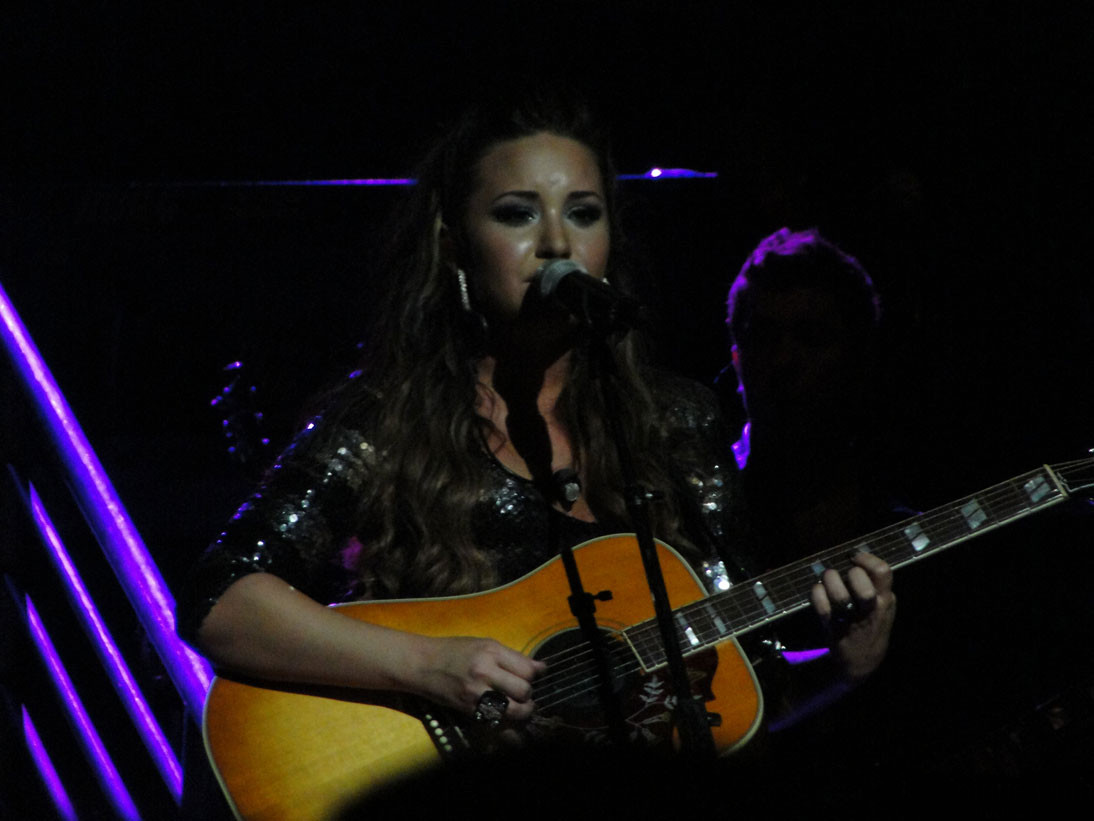
Lovato performing "Catch Me" during A Special Night with Demi Lovato

In the United States, Here We Go Again debuted at number one on the Billboard 200 chart with 108,000 copies sold in its first week, becoming her first No. 1 album in there. Lovato also became the eighth solo artist to top the chart under the age of 18. The figure was an improvement over the first-week sales of Don't Forget, which moved 89,000 copies. The feat made Here We Go Again the fourth album of 2009 under the Disney Music Group to peak at number one. In its second week, the album fell to number eight with 39,000 copies sold. At the end of 2009, the album ranked at number 109 on Billboard's year-end chart. As of October 2017, the album has sold 514,000 copies in the US according to Billboard.

In Canada, the album entered the Canadian Albums Chart at number five, and stayed on the chart for five weeks. In Australia, the album spent one week at number 40 on the ARIA Albums Chart. In New Zealand, it debuted at number ten and spent a total of nine weeks on the chart. In Mexico, Here We Go Again debuted at number 45 on the Top 100 Mexico chart and reached its peak position of 25 in its second week. Across Europe, the album debuted at number 36 in Greece and later reached number five. In Spain, the album spent thirteen weeks on the chart and peaked at number 35. In 2010, Here We Go Again made its debut at number 141 on the Oricon albums chart in Japan. In October 2011, the album debuted and peaked at number 88 on the Ultratop chart in the Flanders region of Belgium.

== Track listing ==
Here We Go Again track listing
No.	Title	Writer(s)	Producer(s)	Length
1.	"Here We Go Again"	Isaac Hasson; Lindy Robbins; Mher Filian	SuperSpy	3:46
2.	"Solo"	Demi Lovato; Scott Cutler; Anne Preven	John Fields	3:15
3.	"U Got Nothin' on Me"	Lovato; Hasson; Filian	SuperSpy	3:38
4.	"Falling Over Me"	Lovato; Jon McLaughlin; Fields	Fields	4:06
5.	"Quiet"	Lovato; Preven; Cutler	Fields	2:45
6.	"Catch Me"	Lovato	Fields	3:10
7.	"Every Time You Lie"	Lovato; Fields; McLaughlin	Fields	3:49
8.	"Got Dynamite"	Gary Clark; E. Kidd Bogart; Victoria Horn	Clark	3:25
9.	"Stop the World"	Lovato; Nick Jonas; PJ Bianco	Fields	3:34
10.	"World of Chances"	Lovato; John Mayer	Fields	2:51
11.	"Remember December"	Lovato; Fields; Preven	Fields	3:12
12.	"Everything You're Not"	Lovato; Toby Gad; Robbins	Fields	3:43
13.	"Gift of a Friend"	Lovato; Adam Watts; Andy Dodd	Dodd; Watts	3:25
14.	"So Far So Great" (Sonny with a Chance theme song)	Aris Archontis; Jeannie Lurie; Chen Neeman	Archontis; Neeman; Lurie	2:15
Total length:				46:50

=== Notes ===
- "Gift of a Friend" and "So Far So Great" are listed as bonus tracks, although they are included on every existing edition of the album.
- International edition includes the bonus tracks "Don't Forget" and "La La Land", taken from Lovato's debut album Don't Forget. International iTunes edition also includes the music video of said bonus tracks and "Here We Go Again".
- Japanese edition includes Sunset in Ibiza Remix of "Here We Go Again" as a bonus track. It also includes enhanced content, which features the music videos of "Here We Go Again" and "Remember December", the Wembley Arena live recording of "Here We Go Again" and behind the scene footage of "Remember December".
- Brazilian and Colombian special edition includes a bonus DVD, which features the live recording of Lovato's performance at Wembley Arena.

=== Sampling credits ===
- "Got Dynamite" contains acoustic drum samples from Geoff Dugmore's "Brutal Beats" from Zero-G.

== Credits and personnel ==
Credits are adapted from the liner notes.

=== Recording locations ===
- SuperSpy Studios; Los Angeles, California
- Resonate Studios; Burbank, California
- Safe House Studios; California
- The Jungle Room; Glendale, California
- Studio Wishbone; Los Angeles
- The Treehouse; Studio City, California
- Ocean Way Recording; Los Angeles

=== Personnel ===
- Demi Lovato – vocals
- Aris Archontis – mixing (14)
- Chris Anderson-Bazzoli – copyist (6, 7, 10)
- Jesse Astin – guitars (5)
- Tommy Barbarella – synthesizers (2, 11)
- Michael Bland – drums (4, 7), programming (11)
- Ken Chastain – percussion and programming (2, 4, 5, 7, 10–12), additional recording (2, 4–7, 9–12)
- Daphne Chen – violin (6, 7, 10)
- Lauren Chipman – viola (6, 7, 10)
- Gary Clark – instruments, programming, and engineering (8)
- Bob Clearmountain – mixing (13)
- Mathew Cooker – cello (6, 7, 10)
- Jason Coons – engineer (1, 3)
- Dorian Crozier – drums (1–3, 6, 11, 12), engineer (1, 3)
- Andy Dodd – engineer (13)
- Richard Dodd – cello (6, 7, 10)
- Geoff Dugmore – acoustic drum samples (8)
- John Fields – bass guitar (2–7, 9–12), guitars (2, 4–7, 9, 11, 12), keyboards (2, 4–7, 9–12), programming (2, 4, 5, 9, 11, 12), drums (5, 10), percussion (6), background vocals (9), engineer (2, 4–7, 9–12), mixing (4–7, 9–12)
- Mher Filian – keyboards and programming (1, 3)
- Nikki Flores – additional background vocals (8)
- Eric Gorfain – violin (6, 7, 10)
- Paul David Hager – additional recording (2, 4–7, 9–12), mixing (4–7, 8–12)
- Isaac Hasson – guitars, synthesizers and programming (1, 3)
- Kenny Johnson – bass guitar (1)
- Nick Jonas – drums, guitars, and vocals (9)
- Chris Lord-Alge – mixing (1–3)
- Stephen Lu – string arranger and conductor (6, 7, 10)
- John Mayer – guitars (10)
- Jon McLaughlin – piano and synthesizers (4, 6), background vocals (4)
- Dave McNair – mastering
- Steven Miller – strings engineer (6 7, 10)
- Sheryl Nields – photography
- Will Owsley – guitars (2, 4, 9, 11, 12), phasor guitar (6), synthesizers (11), background vocals (11, 12), additional recording (2, 4–7, 9–12)
- Radu Pieptea – violin (6, 7, 10)
- Wes Precourt – violin (6, 7, 10)
- Lindy Robbins – background vocals (1)
- David Sage – viola (6, 7, 10)
- Simon Sampath-Kumar – engineer (1, 3)
- Wesley Seidman – assistant strings engineer (6, 7, 10)
- David Snow – creative direction
- SuperSpy – engineers (1, 3)
- Gavin Taylor – art direction, design
- Adam Watts – engineer (13)

== Charts ==
=== Weekly charts ===
Chart (2009–12)	Peak position
Australian Albums Chart	40
Argentinian Albums Chart	10
Belgian Albums Chart (Flanders)	88
Belgian Heatseeker Albums Chart (Flanders)	3
Brazilian Albums Chart	20
Canadian Albums Chart	5
Greek Albums Chart	5
Italian Albums Chart	96
Japanese Albums Chart	141
Mexican Albums Chart	25
New Zealand Albums Chart	10
Spanish Albums Chart	35
US Billboard 200	1

=== Year-end charts ===
Chart (2009)	Position
US Billboard 200	109

== Certifications ==
Region	Certification	Certified units/sales
Brazil (Pro-Música Brasil)	Platinum	60,000^{*}
United States (RIAA)	Gold	514,000
^{*} Sales figures based on certification alone.

== Release history ==
Region	Date	Format	Label
United States	July 21, 2009	CD, digital download	Hollywood
Australia	August 11, 2009	Digital download	Hollywood
New Zealand	August 11, 2009	Digital download	Hollywood
Germany	October 2, 2009	Digital download	Hollywood
Germany	October 16, 2009	CD	Universal
United Kingdom	February 22, 2010	CD, digital download	Fascination
Japan	March 3, 2010	CD, digital download	Avex Trax
Various	June 26, 2020	Vinyl	Hollywood

== See also ==
- List of Billboard 200 number-one albums of 2009
