= A Year Without Rain =

2010 studio album by Selena Gomez & the Scene

- Standard edition cover

Studio album by Selena Gomez & the Scene
- Released: September 17, 2010
- Recorded: April 1, 2010 – August 21, 2010
- Studios: BAMF Studios (Los Angeles, CA); Soundtrack Studios (New York, NY); Soundmaster Studios, Ltd. (Budapest, Hungary); Strawberrybee Studios (Los Angeles, CA); The Jungle Room (Glendale, CA); SOMD Studios (Los Angeles, CA); The Lair Studios (Los Angeles, CA); Superspy Studios
- Genres: Dance-pop; synth-pop
- Length: 34:39
- Label: Hollywood
- Producers: Kevin Rudolf; Andrew Bolooki; Jeff Halatrax; Jon Lind; Brian Reeves; Toby Gad; Rock Mafia; Adam Anders; Peer Astrom; Jonas Jeberg; Matt Squire; Superspy

Selena Gomez & the Scene chronology
Kiss & Tell (2009)	A Year Without Rain (2010)	The Club Remixes (2010)

Singles from A Year Without Rain
- 1. "Round & Round" Released: June 22, 2010; 2. "A Year Without Rain" Released: September 7, 2010

A Year Without Rain is the second studio album by American band Selena Gomez & the Scene. The album was released on September 17, 2010, via Hollywood Records. Gomez worked with Rock Mafia duo Tim James and Antonina Armato, as well as Fefe Dobson, Toby Gad, and Superspy. New contributions came from Kevin Rudolf, Katy Perry, Jonas Jeberg and RedOne among others.

Due to the success of their breakout hit, "Naturally", the record roots mainly from dance-pop and synth-pop, rather than the pop rock and electronic rock sound of Kiss & Tell. While making use of the Auto-Tune effect, the album also infuses influences of several other genres, including dancehall and Eurodance, among others. According to Gomez, most of the songs on the album are dedicated to the fans, while she wanted content with more melodies and empowering lyric themes.

The album has been given mixed to positive reviews, with critics noting it as an improvement from the band's debut album. A Year Without Rain debuted in the United States at number four, selling 66,000 copies in its first week. The album spawned two top 40 hit singles in the United States, lead single, "Round & Round", and the title track "A Year Without Rain". In January 2011, the album was certified Gold by RIAA making it the band's second gold selling album.

== Background and development ==
=== Recording and production ===
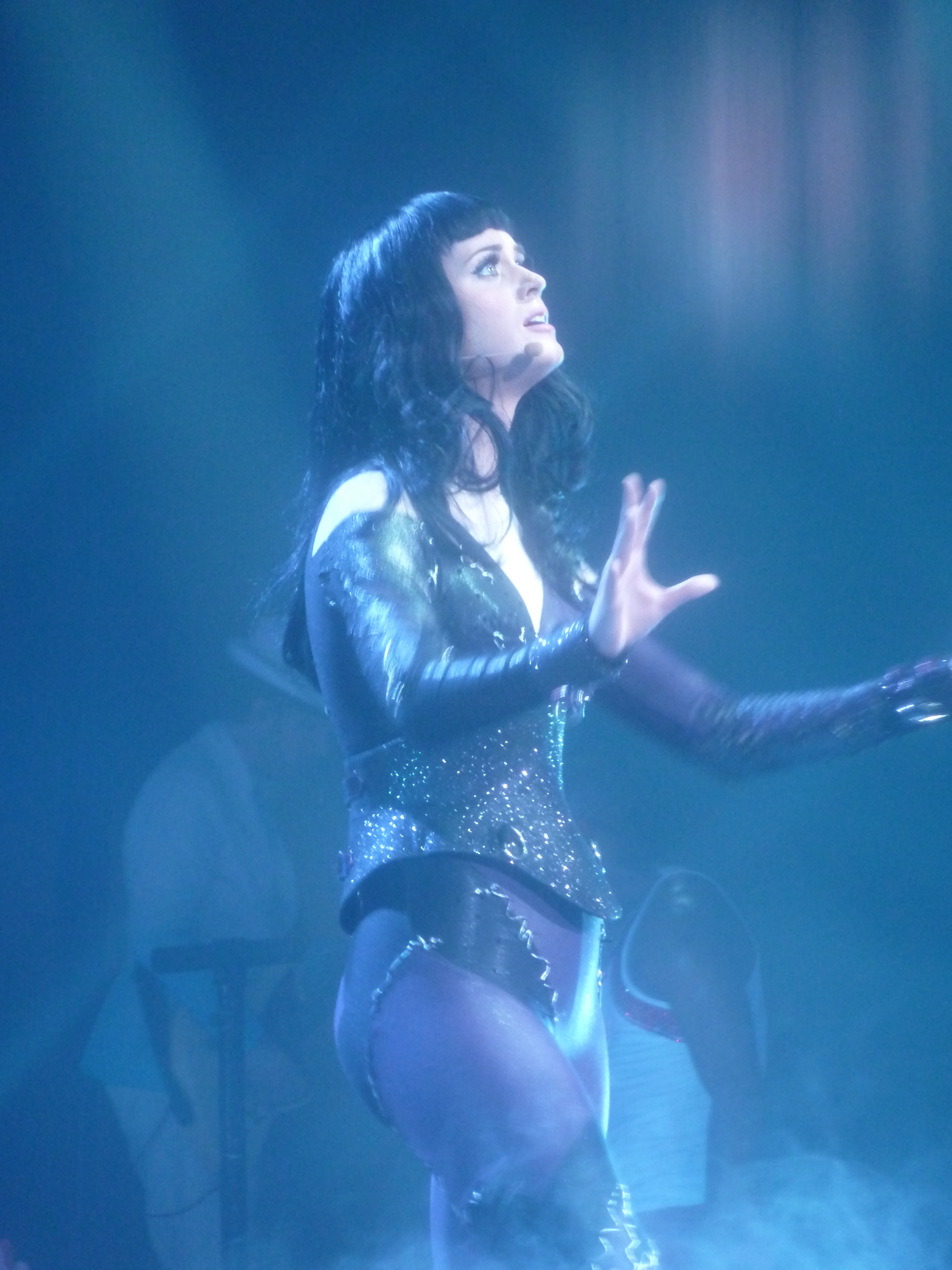
American pop singer Katy Perry (pictured) was one of the many collaborators the band worked with on the album.

In an interview with MTV News in February 2010, when referring to the then-upcoming record, Selena Gomez said, "It's kind of different — older — and it's kind of got, like, a reggae sound." Gomez also stated she was unsure of taking on the responsibility of the album's main songwriter, unwanting the added pressure. She also talked about producers for the album, expressing interest in working with "Naturally" producers, Rock Mafia. She pointed out main goals for the record, which were making sure that she could relate to it, and that the fans could also, stating, "all of those songs are things that I went through, and that's why I put that all together." Later in an interview with Digital Spy, Gomez gave hints about the album, stating that instead of pulling another single from 2009's Kiss & Tell, she looked forward to moving into the next album, which would be completely different.

Gomez stated that the album was named after the titular single because it was the first song recorded for the album, and she wanted to base the rest of the work on the song. Gomez went into further explanation, stating, "I mean, even down from putting the track listing and numbering it, I wanted to make sure I envisioned [fans] putting it in their car or putting it on their iPod and how I wanted them to listen to the record." According to Gomez, most songs on the album were inspired by the band's dedicated fans, as she stated, "I wish I could give to them, because they mean so much to me." Calling the album "a feel-good record", Gomez said it has a more dance/techno vibe. The frontwoman also said that she wanted something with more "meaning and melody, and more empowering lyrics." About the new techno-leaning, Gomez said that it was inspired by the success of their breakout hit, "Naturally". She explained, "There's a feeling when I perform that song that I love, so when I was going back in the studio, I had a better understanding of where I wanted to be musically."

In July 2010, Gomez confirmed that an unreleased track co-penned by Katy Perry was given to her, and that Perry also contributed background vocals. She also confirmed the titles of songs "A Year Without Rain" and "Intuition". On August 17, 2010, Gomez revealed the album's track listing.

== Composition and singles ==
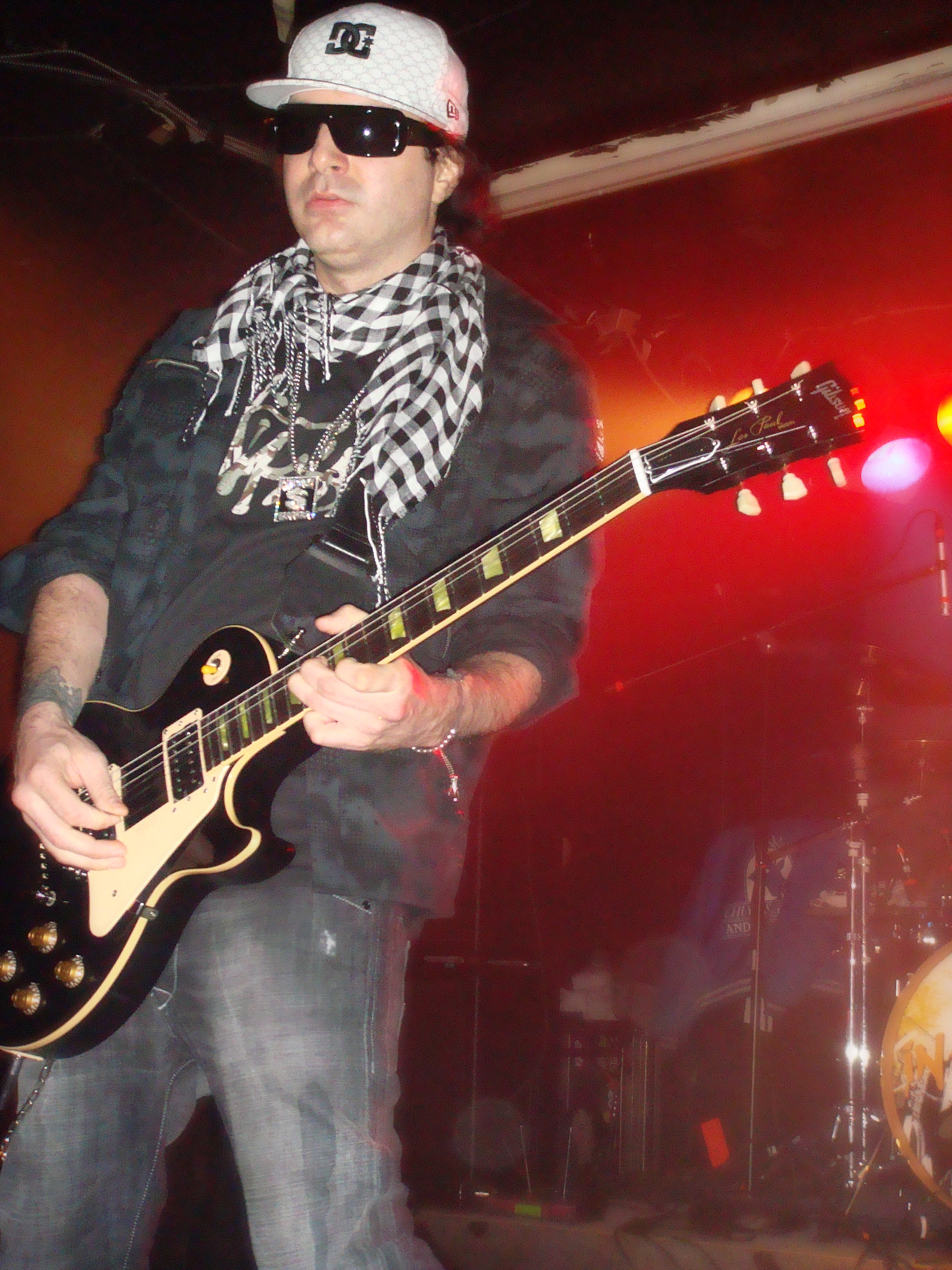
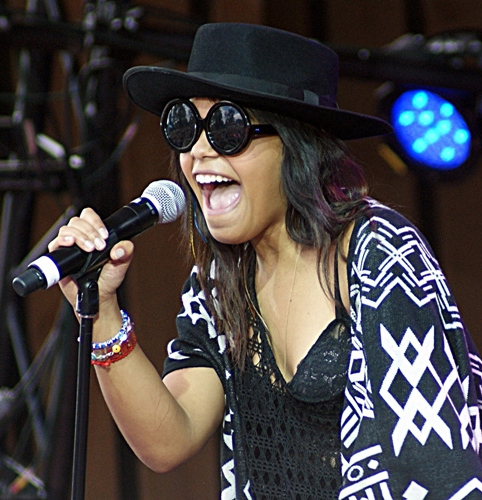
A Year Without Rain features a variety of renowned artists including Kevin Rudolf (left), and Fefe Dobson (right).

The album features predominant dance-pop, and synthpop characteristics, while incorporating Eurodance, dancehall and disco influences. On most tracks, Gomez's vocals contain the Auto-Tune effect. Lyrical content deals with themes of love, freedom, and the joy of living in the moment. Tim Sendra of Allmusic noted while Kiss & Tell was more lighthearted and fun, that this album is "more serious lyrically and musically." Sendra also said where the previous album had a "retro feel" and "plenty of guitars", this work was "totally of the moment", accompanied by Auto-Tune and guest raps. Album opener "Round & Round", an upbeat synth-driven song, features a "riding electro groove", while "Summer's Not Hot" has a Eurodance chorus, courtesy of RedOne. "Spotlight" seems to derive from dancehall, and according to Mikael Wood of Billboard, the song does not feature a hook. The title track, "A Year Without Rain" is a dance ballad that also shows disco music elements, described as "emo". Eric Bellinger makes an appearance in rap interludes in "Intuition", while Katy Perry sing backing vocals on "Rock God". "Ghost of You" is another ballad about breakup. The ending track "Live Like There's No Tomorrow" has been called a power ballad.

The album's lead single, "Round & Round", co-written and produced by Kevin Rudolf of Cash Money and Andrew Bolooki, Jeff Halavacs, was released on June 22, 2010. Fefe Dobson and Andrew Bolooki also receives writing credits. The song received positive reviews from critics who noted its catchiness and expanding of Gomez's demographic. The single was met with chart success as well, debuting at number 24 on the Billboard Hot 100 in the US. The single also became the band's second dance hit, when it peaked at number 2 on the Hot Dance Club Play chart. The song also had radio success, peaking at number 34 on the Pop Songs chart. Outside of the US, the song was less successful. In Canada, the song only climbed to a peak of 51, despite the success of their previous singles in the country. In the United Kingdom, where 'Naturally' performed inside the Top 10, 'Round & Round' failed to match its success, only reaching a peak of 47. In Australia, the single is one of their lowest performing songs there to date, only reaching a peak of 80 on the singles chart. The song's accompanying music video, shot in Budapest, Hungary, features Gomez and the band in a secret spy storyline. The second single, "A Year Without Rain", written by Lindy Robbins and produced by Toby Gad, was released on September 7, 2010. It debuted at thirty-five in the United States, where it peaked. Despite little to no success on US radio and downloads, the single was a dance hit, becoming the band's second single to top the Hot Dance Club Play chart. In Canada, the single debuted at number 37, before quickly climbing to a peak of 30. This makes it the band's second single to reach the Top 40 in Canada, as well as the band's third Top 40 hit in the United States. In Australia, the song debuted and peaked at 78, only two spots higher than their previous single. The song did enjoy success in Belgium, however, reaching a peak of 3 on their singles chart.

== Promotion ==
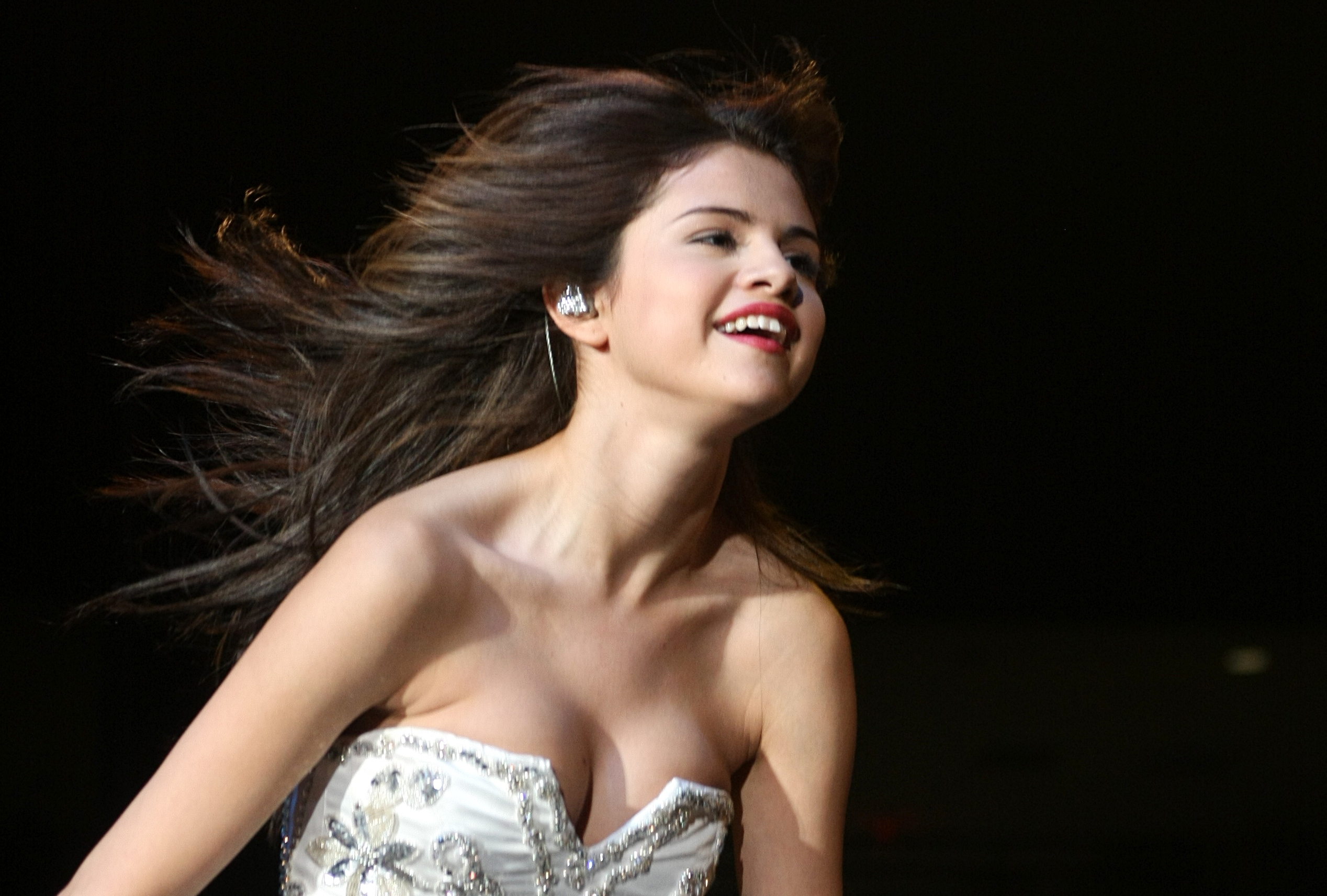
Selena Gomez performing live at KISS 108 Jingle Ball December 2010

A Year Without Rain was promoted mainly through a series of live televised performances, as well as a tour. Gomez first performed "Round & Round" live for the first time on America's Got Talent on July 14, 2010. The performance saw Gomez wearing a red dress that spread out at the bottom, while her band performed behind her. Gomez and her band also made an appearance on The Ellen DeGeneres Show, on September 22, where they performed "A Year Without Rain". On September 23, only six days after the album's release, Gomez and The Scene appeared on Good Morning America, where they performed "Round & Round", as well as "A Year Without Rain". While promoting in the United Kingdom, Gomez appeared on Daybreak on September 27, 2010, and on Blue Peter on the following day, September 28, 2010. Gomez performed the song on MTV's The Seven on October 1, 2010. On November 16, Gomez performed the title track on Lopez Tonight. The performance saw Gomez wearing a silver, strapless dress with sparkles on it, performing the song as the show closed. On December 1, the song was yet again performed on Live with Regis and Kelly, in which Gomez, wearing a sleeveless sparkly dress, performed the song towards the end of the show. They also performed the song at the 2011 People's Choice Awards on January 5, 2011, and afterwards were awarded the Choice award for Favorite Breakout Artist. Gomez appeared on stage accompanied by low lights and fog. Kara Warner of MTV News commented, "Although it wasn't a stadium-rocking performance à la Lady Gaga or Katy Perry, Gomez powered through her pop song with a sense of earnestness and commitment. She didn't even miss a beat when her earpiece appeared to fall out mid-song."

The band also promoted the album through their second tour, A Year Without Rain Tour. Previously, the band had toured the United States and Europe playing at state fairs and music festivals with a few headlining concerts thrown in. The tour became a major success with critics and spectators alike, selling out many dates within the United States. After the release of their second studio album, the band tour alongside Katy Perry, Bruno Mars and Enrique Iglesias for the KIIS-FM Jingle Ball concert series. Gomez remarked her excitement for the tour and stated that it provided motivation to plan a "big" tour for 2011. During a backstage interview, Gomez remarked that she was conceptualizing the tour as far as stage and production and promised an amazing show with an "epic" stage for 2011. The tour was officially announced on the band's official website in September 2010 to begin in London. Allstar Weekend opened up for Gomez on select dates, while Christina Grimmie, who also had done background vocals on the album, was present for most of the US shows on the tour.

== Critical reception ==
Professional ratings
Review scores
Source	Rating
About.com	4/5 stars
Allmusic	3.5/5 stars
Billboard	77/100
musicOMH	3/5 stars
Portrait Magazine	positive
Wairarapa Times-Age	3.5/5 stars
The Washington Post	mixed

A Year Without Rain generally received positive reviews by the music critics, Mikael Wood of Billboard stated while the lyrics contain "standard issue tween-pop topics", the effort was an improvement over 2009's Kiss & Tell, commenting that the production outweighed the lyrical content. Although noting most songs on the album as "over-produced" dance-pop songs ballads and that Gomez spends most of the record trying to "dig herself out" of vocal effects, Allison Stewart of The Washington Post said at its worst, the album was a marked improvement over the "attitude-heavy", Kiss & Tell. Calling Gomez a young version of Katy Perry, Stewart commented, "Disney princesses seem to come along every 15 minutes, but few of them charm like Selena Gomez." Bill Lamb of About.com reviewed the album saying, "Clearly Selena Gomez and the Scene have evolved musically in the short year that has elapsed since their first album Kiss and Tell... This time around they are immersed in a more polished dance-pop style that moves easily from the glossy midtempo title cut to perky uptempo club tunes. If you have dismissed Selena Gomez as merely a cookie cutter Disney pop princess, it is high time to listen to more of her music and [the music] is likely to change your mind. While not deep, A Year Without Rain is a solid, pleasing pop album.

The Wairarapa Times-Age said in their review of the album, "A Year Without Rain, Selena Gomez & The Scene's second album, is full of dance floor-friendly synth pop, probably more suited to a slightly older set than her teen-targeted TV show, and with less of a rock edge than fellow Disney Stars Miley Cyrus and Demi Lovato." At the end of the review, they listed "Live Like There's No Tomorrow", and the title track "A Year Without Rain" as the two highlights from the album. MusicOMH gave the album 3 out of 5 stars, stating "It would be the easiest thing in the world to dismiss A Year Without Rain as a cynical implementation of fan base exploitation; Gomez is, with regards to a certain demographic, a licence to print money. She also, however, boasts an embarrassment of talents, and those talents are more often than not afforded the space to breathe on a solid pop offering." PortraitMagazine also praised the album, commenting "Though Selena does seem intent on holding fast to the dance-pop style, with a bit of techno thrown in here and there for good measure, just like she did on her first album, the tracks she's got here are a definite improvement over her previous effort. She's trying out new things and experimenting a little with her sound. I was actually able to listen to this album all the way through without getting a migraine, which, I'm sorry to say, I couldn't do on her first. Because I think that she is such a talented person, I can't be happier with this album. Yes, there are a few tracks that, now that I've heard them, I don't really care to listen to again, but overall, this is a great album." Allmusic praised the album as well, stating "A Year Without Rain is similar in many ways but also very different in some important ways. Where Kiss was lighthearted and fun, Year is less fun and more serious both lyrically and musically. It feels like someone in her camp decided that it was time to position Gomez as more grown up, time to leave behind the sunny, good-time appeal and get a little more 'real'."

== Commercial performance ==
A Year Without Rain was released on September 17, 2010. It debuted on the US Billboard 200 at number 4, with sales of 66,154, barely beating out Kiss & Tell, which sold barely over 66,000 and debuted at number 9 on the Billboard 200. After three months of release, the album charted at number 144 on the Billboard 200 Year-End Chart for 2010. It fared much better the following year, when it peaked at number 67 on the same chart. On January 19, 2011, the album was certified Gold in the US, for shipments of 500,000. As of January 2020, the album has sold 817,000 copies in the United States. The album debuted on the Canadian Albums Chart at number 6, 16 spots higher than the band's previous effort, which debuted and peaked at number 22 on the chart. The album also peaked at number 6 in Spain, 4 spots lower than that of Kiss & Tell. In Portugal and the Czech Republic, the album climbed to a peak of number 9, making it the band's first album to chart in both countries. In Greece, the album debuted at number 10, an 8 spot drop from that of the band's previous album. The album quickly fell off the Greek Albums Chart, however, attributed mainly by the low performance of the two singles in the country. In both Belgium and Poland, the album narrowly missed the Top 10, debuting at number 11.

In the United Kingdom, the album debuted at number 14, two spots lower than Kiss & Tell did the previous year. The album had the opposite chart performance in Mexico, where it debuted at 16, 4 spots higher than its predecessor. In Germany, the album debuted at number 22, 3 spots lower than the previous album. The poor chart performance in the country is due mainly to the poor performance of both singles. In New Zealand, the album debuted at number 24, three spots lower than Kiss & Tell did the previous year. The album saw a similar sales decline in France, when it debuted at number 26 on the official albums chart, two spots lower than the previous album. In Switzerland, the album debuted at number 37, one spot lower than Kiss & Tell. In Ireland, A Year Without Rain performed very poorly compared to Kiss & Tell, debuting at number 40 on the official albums chart. The previous year, Kiss & Tell had debuted and peaked at number 14 on the chart, making a 26 spot difference between the two albums. A Year Without Rain did have success in Australia however, where Kiss & Tell failed to chart. The album debuted and peaked at number 46 on the official albums chart. The album also helped Gomez & The Scene develop a fan base in the Netherlands, when it debuted at number 51 on the official albums chart, becoming their first album to chart in the country. The album was certified Gold on January 19, 2011, by the RIAA. As of January 2020, the album has sold 817,000 copies in the US.

== Track listing ==
A Year Without Rain track listing
No.	Title	Writer(s)	Producer(s)	Length
1.	"Round & Round"	Kevin Rudolf; Jacob Kasher; Fefe Dobson; Jeff Halavacs; Andrew Bolooki	Rudolf; Bolooki; Jeff Halatrax; Jon Lind^{[a]}; Brian Reeves^{[a]}	3:06
2.	"A Year Without Rain"	Toby Gad; Lindy Robbins	Gad	3:54
3.	"Naturally (Note: "Naturally" is excluded from the North America and Japanese releases of the album.)"	Antonina Armato; Tim James; Devrim Karaoglu	Rock Mafia; Devrim Karaoglu^{[b]}	3:22
4.	"Rock God"	Katy Perry; Printz Board; Victoria Horn	Rock Mafia; Lind^{[a]}; Reeves^{[a]}	3:08
5.	"Off the Chain"	Armato; James; Karaoglu	Rock Mafia; Lind^{[a]}; Reeves^{[a]}	4:03
6.	"Summer's Not Hot"	Armato; James; RedOne	Rock Mafia	3:05
7.	"Intuition" (featuring Eric Bellinger)	Gad; Robbins; Eric Bellinger	Gad	2:59
8.	"Spotlight"	Shelly Peiken; Nikki Hassman; Peer Astrom; Adam Anders	Astrom; Anders; Lind^{[a]}; Reeves^{[a]}	3:31
9.	"Ghost of You"	Peiken; Jonas Jeberg; Rasmus Seebach	Jeberg; Lind^{[a]}; Reeves^{[a]}	3:23
10.	"Sick of You"	Matt Squire; Lucas Banker	Squire	3:23
11.	"Live Like There's No Tomorrow"	Matt Bronleewe; Nicky Chinn; Andrew Fromm; Meghan Kabir	SuperSpy	4:07
Total length:				38:01

Deluxe edition bonus tracks
No.	Title	Writer(s)	Producer(s)	Length
12.	"Round & Round" (Dave Audé Radio Remix)	Rudolf; Kasher; Dobson; Halavacs; Bolooki	Rudolf; Bolooki; Jeff Halatrax; Dave Audé^{[d]}; Jon Lind^{[a]}; Brian Reeves^{[a]}	3:33
13.	"A Year Without Rain" (EK's Future Classic Remix – Radio Edit)	Gad; Robbins	Gad; Eric Kupper^{[d]}	4:05
14.	"Un Año Sin Lluvia" (Spanish version of "A Year Without Rain")	Gad; Robbins; Edgar Cortazar^{[c]}; Mark Portmann^{[c]}	Reeves; Gad^{[e]}	3:30
Total length:				49:09

Notes

- ^{^[a]} signifies a vocal producer
- ^{^[b]} signifies a co-producer
- ^{^[c]} signifies a language adapter
- ^{^[d]} signifies a remixer
- ^{^[e]} signifies an original producer
- Deluxe edition includes a bonus DVD featuring "Girl Meets World" (extended edition), "Girl on Film" (behind the scenes at the photo shoot), "A Year Without Rain Video Shoot" (behind the scenes), and music videos for "Round & Round" and "Naturally".
- iTunes Store deluxe edition includes the bonus music videos "Round & Round", and "A Year Without Rain".
- Asda exclusive edition includes the bonus remix track "Round & Round" (Razor & Guido Club Vocal Mix), the making of the album Kiss & Tell, and a video message from Selena Gomez.

== Personnel ==
Credits adapted from the International edition's liner notes

=== Musicians ===
- Selena Gomez – vocals (all tracks)
- Eric Bellinger – vocals (track 7)
- Nikki Hassman – background vocals and vocal arrangement (track 8)
- BG5 – background vocals (track 6)
- Kara Britz – background vocals (track 10)
- Chelsea Davis – background vocals (track 10)
- Brooke Adams – additional background vocals (track 5)
- Windy Wagner – additional background vocals (track 5)
- Isaac Hasson – guitar, bass guitar and keyboards (track 11)
- Tim Pierce – guitar (tracks 4–6)
- Daniel Heløy Davidsen – guitar (track 9)
- Toby Gad – instruments and arrangement (tracks 2, 7)
- Matt Squire – instruments (track 10)
- Adam Anders – vocal arrangement (track 8)

=== Technical ===
- Brian Reeves – recording (tracks 1, 4, 5, 8–10); mixing (track 9)
- Jon Lind – recording (tracks 1, 4, 5, 8, 9)
- Travis Huff – recording (track 10)
- SuperSpy – recording (track 11)
- Serban Ghenea – mixing (tracks 1, 10)
- Toby Gad – mixing and recording (tracks 2, 7)
- Rock Mafia – mixing and digital editing (tracks 4–6)
- Paul Palmer – mixing (tracks 4–6)
- Peer Åström – mixing and programming (track 8)
- Clif Norrell – mixing (track 11)
- Steve Hammons – engineering (tracks 4–6)
- Adam Comstock – engineering (tracks 4–6)
- John Hanes – mix engineering (tracks 1, 10)
- Tim Roberts – mix engineering assistance (tracks 1, 10)
- Nigel Lundemo – digital editing (tracks 5, 6)
- Deyder Cintron – digital editing (track 8)
- Adam Anders – digital editing (track 8)
- Isaac Hasson – programming (track 11)
- Mher Filian – drum programming and beats (track 11)
- Kay N' Dustry – additional programming (track 9)
- Robert Vosgien – mastering (all tracks)
- David Snow – creative director
- Jeri Heiden – art direction
- Nick Steinhardt – art direction and design
- Amber Gray – photography
- Miranda Penn Turin – photography

=== Production ===
- Toby Gad – production (tracks 2, 7)
- Rock Mafia – production (tracks 4–6)
- Andrew Bolooki – production (track 1)
- Jeff Halatrax – production (track 1)
- Kevin Rudolf – production (track 1)
- Antonina Armato – production (track 3)
- Tim James – production (track 3)
- Adam Anders – production (track 8)
- Peer Åström – production (track 8)
- Jonas Jeberg – production (track 9)
- SuperSpy – production (track 11)
- Devrim Karaoglu – co-production (track 3)
- Brian Reeves – vocal production (tracks 1, 4, 5, 8, 9)
- Jon Lind – vocal production (tracks 1, 4, 5, 8, 9)

== Charts ==
=== Weekly charts ===
Weekly chart performance for A Year Without Rain
Chart (2010)	Peak position
Australian Albums Chart	46
Austrian Albums Chart	19
Belgian Albums Chart (Flanders)	11
Belgian Albums Chart (Wallonia)	21
Canadian Albums Chart	6
Czech Republic Albums Chart	9
Dutch Albums Chart	51
French Albums Chart	26
German Albums Chart	22
Greek Albums Chart	10
Hungarian Albums Chart	23
Irish Albums Chart	40
Italian Albums Chart	28
Japanese Albums Chart	52
Mexican Albums Chart	16
New Zealand Albums Chart	24
Polish Albums Chart	11
Portuguese Albums Chart	9
Spanish Albums Chart	6
Swiss Albums Chart	37
UK Albums Chart	14
US Billboard 200	4

=== Year-end charts ===
2010 year-end chart performance for A Year Without Rain
Chart (2010)	Position
US Billboard 200	144

2011 year-end chart performance for A Year Without Rain
Chart (2011)	Position
US Billboard 200	67

== Certifications ==
Certifications and sales for A Year Without Rain
Region	Certification	Certified units/sales
Brazil (Pro-Música Brasil)	Gold	20,000^{*}
Canada (Music Canada)	Gold	40,000^{^}
Poland (ZPAV)	Platinum	20,000^{*}
Portugal (AFP)	Gold	10,000^{^}
United Kingdom (BPI)	Silver	60,000^{^}
United States (RIAA)	Gold	500,000^{^}
^{*} Sales figures based on certification alone.^{^} Shipments figures based on certification alone.

== Release history ==
Release dates for A Year Without Rain
Country	Date	Format	Label
Poland	September 17, 2010	CD	Universal Music
Canada	September 21, 2010	CD/CD+DVD	Universal Music
Germany	September 21, 2010	CD/CD+DVD	Universal Music
United States	September 21, 2010	CD/CD+DVD	Hollywood
Australia	September 24, 2010	CD+DVD	Universal Music
Mexico	September 24, 2010	CD+DVD	Universal Music
United Kingdom	October 4, 2010	CD/CD+DVD	Fascination
Brazil	October 15, 2010	CD/CD+DVD	Universal Music
India	October 29, 2010	CD/CD+DVD	Universal Music
France	November 2, 2010	CD/CD+DVD	Fascination
Japan	January 26, 2011	CD/CD+DVD	Avex International
Taiwan	January 28, 2011	CD+DVD	Universal Music
