= Upping the Ante =

- Friday Night Lights episode
- Episode no.: Season 1 Episode 14
- Directed by: Allison Liddi-Brown
- Written by: David Hudgins
- Cinematography by: David Boyd
- Editing by: Peter B. Ellis
- Original release date: January 31, 2007
- Running time: 43 minutes

Guest appearances
- Brett Cullen as Walt Riggins; Brad Leland as Buddy Garrity

Episode chronology
← Previous "Little Girl I Wanna Marry You"	Next → "Blinders"
- Friday Night Lights (season 1)

"Upping the Ante" is the fourteenth episode of the first season of the American sports drama television series Friday Night Lights, inspired by the 1990 nonfiction book by H. G. Bissinger. The episode was written by producer David Hudgins and directed by Allison Liddi-Brown. It originally aired on NBC on January 31, 2007.

The series is set in the fictional town of Dillon, a small, close-knit community in rural West Texas. It follows a high school football team, the Dillon Panthers. It features a set of characters, primarily connected to Coach Eric Taylor, his wife Tami, and their daughter Julie. In the episode, Julie starts to question her relationship with Matt, while Tim visits his father outside the town.

According to Nielsen Media Research, the episode was seen by an estimated 6.73 million household viewers and gained a 2.4 ratings share among adults aged 18–49. The episode received critical acclaim, with critics praising the performances, Tim's storyline and directing.

== Plot ==
During a dinner with the Garritys, Jason (Scott Porter) gets into an argument with Buddy (Brad Leland) over living off quad rugby. Their conversation also addresses the Streets' lawsuit, with Buddy expressing disdain over seeing his team getting sued. Jason then surprises Buddy and his wife by saying he and Lyla (Minka Kelly) are getting married, causing her parents to leave.

Julie (Aimee Teegarden) is disappointed when Matt (Zach Gilford) has to cancel their plans due to football-related issues, including an Old 97's concert. Needing a ride home, she is taken by Tyra (Adrianne Palicki), and they begin to develop a friendship. They take care of Lorraine (Louanne Stephens) due to Matt's absence, but Tyra also teaches Julie how to shoplift and even allows her to enter the strip club where her sister Mindy works. When Matt is "kidnapped" by rally girls to pose for a calendar at night, Julie calls him out for lying about nothing happening.

Tim (Taylor Kitsch) gets his driving license suspended after failing to pay a speeding ticket and Billy (Derek Phillips) cannot cover for him as he is not technically his legal guardian. Desperate, he pays a visit to his father Walt (Brett Cullen), and get the signature needed to get his license back. Tim is surprised by Walt's upbeat attitude, especially when he discovers that he always talks about every single game that he played. They decide to play golf, with Walt agreeing to go seeing him play if Tim wins. Walt ends up winning, but Tim calls him out for not wanting to be for them. When Walt states he cannot bring himself to go back to Dillon, Tim leaves.

Lyla tells Jason that they cannot marry, as she feels it is very abrupt. While disappointed, Jason understands. Eric (Kyle Chandler) refuses to answer questions about Smash (Gaius Charles), while he continues pushing on him for his actions. However, after talking with Tami (Connie Britton), he decides to slow down on his treatment as he feels Smash will lose his passion for football. On the day of the game, he tells Smash that he will play, delighting him. As the team takes off into the field, Tim is stopped by Billy, who shows him that Walt has come to the game.

== Production ==
=== Development ===
In January 2007, NBC announced that the fourteenth episode of the season would be titled "Upping the Ante". The episode was written by producer David Hudgins and directed by Allison Liddi-Brown. This was Hudgins' second writing credit, and Liddi-Brown's second directing credit.

== Reception ==
=== Viewers ===
In its original American broadcast, "Upping the Ante" was seen by an estimated 6.73 million household viewers with a 2.4 in the 18–49 demographics. This means that 2.4 percent of all households with televisions watched the episode. It finished 55th out of 100 programs airing from January 29-February 4, 2007. This was a 18% increase in viewership from the previous episode, which was watched by an estimated 5.66 million household viewers with a 2.0 in the 18–49 demographics.

=== Critical reviews ===
"Upping the Ante" received critical acclaim. Eric Goldman of IGN gave the episode a "great" 8.5 out of 10 and wrote, "Week in, week out, the show delivers strong storylines and great acting, that feels far more truthful than many other programs on the air. On the surface, this week's episode might look a bit less impactful than some others, but that's only by virtue of the fact that it didn't have the heart wrenching, tear worthy moments that most episodes of this wonderful series do. In fact, it was another fine hour of television, which likely served as a bit of a prologue to what will probably be bigger events in the near future."

Sonia Saraiya of The A.V. Club gave the episode an "A–" grade and wrote, "I mentioned earlier that 'Upping The Ante' was about family intimacy. The episode follows a few different dynamics and ruthlessly exposes their weaknesses and strengths, when it can."

Alan Sepinwall wrote, "I don't know if Kevin Reilly just had his back turned the week tonight's episode was produced, or if this was the point in the production cycle where Peter Berg and Jason Katims said, 'Screw it; we're going back to making our show,' or if it was just a fluke, but tonight's episode felt the most Friday Night Light-ish since very early in the season." Leah Friedman of TV Guide wrote, "Jerks of the episode: Daddy Riggins and Matt Saracen. Yes, folks, that's right, Matt Saracen. Sure, he protested a little, but then he fell into a hot tub and was reborn a jerk. We all knew it was coming, we saw the promos, and yet my love for him still died just a little."

Brett Love of TV Squad wrote, "Overall, it wasn't my favorite episode, but it was solid. The story keeps cranking along and at the end of each week I am left looking forward to the next episode." Television Without Pity gave the episode an "A–" grade.
