= SuperSpy Productions =

- Occupation(s): Producers, songwriters

SuperSpy Productions was a songwriting and production duo that consisted of Mher Filian and Isaac Hasson in Los Angeles. They contributed several hit songs to popular culture.

== Isaac Hasson ==
The Canadian-born Hasson was a member of the Boston-based Division St., which self-released three albums and provided opening acts for the Barenaked Ladies and the Black Crowes. After growing tired of the club scene, Hasson moved to Los Angeles to focus on songwriting and production.

---

== Mher Filian ==
Filian is currently running his own music production company, splitting his time between New York and LA.

== Credits ==
Demi Lovato - Here We Go Again (Hollywood): “Here We Go Again”, “U Got Nothin on Me”
Selena Gomez - Kiss & Tell (Hollywood): “I Promise You”, “More”
Push Play - Found (Wind-up): “My Everything”
Cassie Steele - Destructo Doll (Rob N Steal)
Instant Star 4 (Orange): “Pavement” Cassie Steele

== TV, Film and Multi Media ==
"Live Like There's No Tomorrow" - Selena Gomez, for the Fox film "Ramona and Beezus"
"Summer Nights" Cassie Steele appearing in The Sims 3 World Adventures
“Damage is Done” appearing in “The Hills”
“Better Off Alone” appearing in “Secret Life of the American Teenager”
“Ride My Train” “Heartbroken Fool” appearing in “All I Want”
“Rock Star Beau” Cassie Steele appearing in Degrassi The Next Generation
