= How Much for Happy =

Studio album by Cassie Steele
- Released: March 15, 2005 (CAN); April 26, 2005 (US)
- Recorded: October 2004 – February 2005
- Genres: Grunge, alternative rock
- Labels: Bullseye Canada, Rob'N'Steal Productions
- Producer: Rob'N'Steal

Cassie Steele chronology
How Much for Happy (2005)	Destructo Doll (2009)

Singles from How Much for Happy
- 1. "Blue Bird" Released: 2005; 2. "Famous" Released: 2005

How Much for Happy is the debut studio album by Canadian singer-songwriter and actress Cassie Steele. It was released in Canada on March 15, 2005, and in the US on April 26, 2005. The album was sold on iTunes in the US for a few months, but after having an argument with Rob'N'Steal Productions about the distribution of How Much for Happy, the album was removed from iTunes, yet was still available on Amazon.com. Physically, the album is now out of print in the US, but it was put back on iTunes. Steele co-wrote 12 of the album's 13 tracks, with the remaining track being a cover of the Jimi Hendrix song "Hey Joe".

== Sales ==
The album was certified gold in Canada, selling more than 25,000 copies.

== Singles ==
Two singles, "Blue Bird" and "Famous", were released off of the album. A music video for "Blue Bird" was released as well, which featured Cassie recording the single along with photos of her.

== Track listing ==
1. "Not Yours Truly"
2. "Famous"
3. "Fantasy"
4. "Blue Bird"
5. "Jaded"
6. "Rock Your Bones"
7. "Drink Me Dry"
8. "Crimson Tears"
9. "Broken (How Much for Happy)"
10. "Empty Eyes"
11. "A Sinner's Prayer"
12. "Love Cost"
13. "Hey Joe"
- Unreleased track: "Things That God Cannot Explain"
