= Disney Channel Playlist =

Compilation album by Disney Channel stars
- Released: June 9, 2009
- Recorded: 2005–2009
- Genres: Pop; pop rock; teen pop
- Label: Walt Disney

Disney Channel stars chronology
Disney Channel Holiday (2007)	Disney Channel Playlist (2009)	Disney Channel Holiday Playlist (2012)

Professional ratings
Review scores
Source	Rating
AllMusic	3/5 stars

Disney Channel Playlist is a compilation album of music featured in Disney Channel Original Series, as well as Disney Channel Original Movies. It was released by Walt Disney Records on June 9, 2009 in the United States. The compilation later went on to be released in Mexico, Brazil and Argentina.

== Track listing ==
No.	Title	Recording artist(s)	Length
1.	"One and the Same" (from Princess Protection Program)	Demi Lovato and Selena Gomez	3:00
2.	"Live to Party" (from Jonas)	Jonas Brothers	2:51
3.	"So Far So Great" (Theme Song from Sonny with a Chance)	Demi Lovato	2:14
4.	"Let It Go" (from Hatching Pete)	Mitchel Musso and Tiffany Thornton	2:36
5.	"Hero in Me" (from Dadnapped)	Emily Osment	2:20
6.	"Let's Get Crazy" (from Hannah Montana)	Hannah Montana	2:35
7.	"Gitchee Gitchee Goo" (from Phineas and Ferb)	Vincent Martella and Ashley Tisdale	1:59
8.	"The Girl Can't Help It" (from Princess Protection Program)	Mitchel Musso	3:22
9.	"Everything Is Not What It Seems" (Theme Song from Wizards of Waverly Place)	Selena Gomez	0:50
10.	"This Is Me" (from Camp Rock)	Demi Lovato and Joe Jonas	3:07
11.	"Breaking Free" (from High School Musical)	Zac Efron, Vanessa Hudgens, and Drew Seeley	3:26
12.	"Fabulous" (from High School Musical 2)	Ashley Tisdale and Lucas Grabeel	3:01
13.	"Run It Back Again" (from Minutemen)	Corbin Bleu	2:51
14.	"Start the Party" (Remix from Camp Rock)	Jordan Francis	2:46
15.	"Dance Me If You Can" (from The Cheetah Girls: One World)	The Cheetah Girls	3:30

== Charts and sales ==
Chart (2009)	Peak position	Sales
U.S. Billboard 200	72	30,000
U.S. Top Kid Albums	1	30,000
