= Disney Girlz Rock =

Compilation album by various artists
- Released: June 7, 2005
- Recorded: 1998–2005
- Genres: Pop; pop rock; teen pop
- Label: Walt Disney

Disney Girlz Rock album chronology
Disney Girlz Rock (2005)	Disney Girlz Rock 2 (2008)

Professional ratings
Review scores
Source	Rating
Allmusic	3/5 stars

Disney Girlz Rock is a compilation of teen pop songs that have been used in Disney Channel and Disney-related productions. It includes some of the most popular female Disney artists and girl groups like The Cheetah Girls, as well as former Disney-turned-mainstream acts such as Hilary Duff, Aly & AJ, Lindsay Lohan and Raven-Symoné. The album was released on June 7, 2005. A follow-up album, Disney Girlz Rock 2, was released in 2008.

== Track listing ==
No.	Title	Writer(s)	From	Length
1.	"Can't Help Falling in Love" (A*Teens)	Hugo Peretti; Luigi Creatore; George David Weiss	Lilo & Stitch	3:05
2.	"Ultimate" (Lindsay Lohan)	Jeff Coplan; Robert Orrall	Freaky Friday	3:05
3.	"Together We Can" (The Cheetah Girls)	Steve Lee; Walter Turbitt; Will Robinson	The Cheetah Girls	1:32
4.	"Our Lips Are Sealed" (Hilary Duff & Haylie Duff)	Jane Wiedlin; Terry Hall	A Cinderella Story †	2:38
5.	"Superstition" (Raven-Symoné)	Stevland Morris	The Haunted Mansion	3:11
6.	"Reach" (Caleigh Peters)	Matthew Gerrard; Kara DioGuardi	Ice Princess	3:41
7.	"Drama Queen (That Girl)" (Lindsay Lohan)	Bill Wolfe; Pam Sheyne; Lohan	Confessions of a Teenage Drama Queen	3:26
8.	"Go Figure" (Everlife)	Andy Dodd; Adam Watts	Go Figure	4:05
9.	"Rush" (Aly & AJ)	Aly Michalka; AJ Michalka; Dan James; Leah Cooney	Twitches	3:09
10.	"Anytime You Need a Friend" (The Beu Sisters)	Walter Afanasieff	Home on the Range	3:19
11.	"This Is My Time" (Raven-Symoné)	Gerrard; Robbie Nevil; Raven-Symoné	The Princess Diaries 2: Royal Engagement	4:23
12.	"I Fly" (Hayden Panettiere)	Bart Howard	Ice Princess	3:31
13.	"Let's Bounce" (Christy Carlson Romano)	Gerrard; Nevil	The Princess Diaries 2: Royal Engagement	3:16
14.	"Reflection" (Christina Aguilera)	Matthew Weiner; David Zippel	Mulan	3:33
15.	"Miracles Happen (When You Believe)" (Myra)	Sheyne; Eliot Kennedy	The Princess Diaries	5:02

† Although A Cinderella Story was released by Warner Bros., the film's soundtrack was released by Disney's Hollywood Records.
