= Don't Forget =

2008 studio album by Demi Lovato

- Standard edition cover

Studio album by Demi Lovato
- Released: September 23, 2008
- Recorded: May 2008
- Studios: Wishbone Studio (North Hollywood, California)
- Genres: Power pop; pop-punk
- Length: 37:42
- Label: Hollywood
- Producers: John Fields; Jonas Brothers

Demi Lovato chronology
Don't Forget (2008)	Here We Go Again (2009)

Deluxe edition cover

Singles from Don't Forget
- 1. "Get Back" Released: August 12, 2008; 2. "La La Land" Released: December 18, 2008; 3. "Don't Forget" Released: March 17, 2009

Don't Forget is the debut studio album by American singer Demi Lovato. It was released on September 23, 2008, by Hollywood Records. She (Note: Lovato uses both she/her and they/them pronouns. This article uses she/her pronouns for consistency.) started working on the album in September 2007, while filming the Disney Channel original movie Camp Rock. Lovato co-wrote most of the songs with the Jonas Brothers, who produced the album along with John Fields. Other songwriters include Kara DioGuardi, Jason Reeves and Rooney frontman Robert Schwartzman. Don't Forget features primarily a power pop and rock sound, with the lyrical content addressing adolescent topics including heartbreak and independence.

The album was met with generally positive reviews from critics, many of whom noted distinctive similarities with the works of the Jonas Brothers. Don't Forget debuted at number two on the US Billboard 200 and was eventually certified gold by the Recording Industry Association of America (RIAA). It has sold over 540,000 copies in the country. Elsewhere, Don't Forget reached the top 10 on the Canadian Albums Chart and reached the top 40 in Spain and New Zealand.

"Get Back" was released as the lead single from the album and reached number 43 on the US Billboard Hot 100. "La La Land" was the second single from the album, peaking at number 52 in the United States and inside the top 40 in Ireland and the United Kingdom. The third single, its title track, reached number 41 in the US. Don't Forget was further promoted by the tour Demi Lovato: Live in Concert.

== Background ==
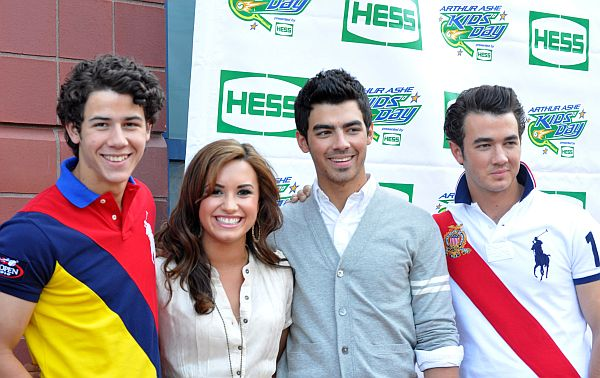
Lovato starred in Camp Rock with the Jonas Brothers, who helped the singer during the production and writing process of Don't Forget.

At 15 years old, Lovato was discovered by Disney Channel during an open call audition in her hometown of Dallas, Texas and made her debut on the short series As the Bell Rings in 2007. Lovato subsequently auditioned for a role on the television series Jonas, but did not get the part. Instead, Lovato received the lead role in the musical film Camp Rock after she impressed network executives. Later, Lovato auditioned for a role on the series Sonny with a Chance, which Lovato also received. For Camp Rock, Lovato submitted an audition tape and Gary Marsh, Disney's president of entertainment, asked her to sing. Lovato recalled that "They kind of put me on the spot. I don't mind it. When people put me on the spot, it's kind of like, 'Hey, I'm not going to get nervous. I'm just going to do what I do.' So I did what I did." Lovato performed Christina Aguilera's "Ain't No Other Man" and Hollywood Records senior vice president Bob Cavallo said that their "jaws just dropped". The stunt resulted in Lovato receiving the lead role in Camp Rock, and a record deal with the label in early 2008.

Lovato enlisted her Camp Rock co-stars the Jonas Brothers to work with her on the album. Lovato said that it was "important" to include them on the album as the singer "would love to have their input anytime". Lovato felt that she needed help with the writing process as she tended to write songs that were "a little bit more intense and less catchy". With the album, Lovato wanted to establish herself as a musician; Lovato did not just want to be known as "the girl from Camp Rock". Lovato explained that her goal was to have fun with the album and that she would include deeper themes on her sophomore effort, stating: "You won't necessarily find a lot of [dark songs] on the album, but hopefully you will on the next album. It's my first one, so I wanted it to be fun — stuff you can drive around in your car to and jam out to."

== Development ==
"Writing songs is what I turn to when I'm really upset or in a really good mood. Sometimes people listen to my music and they're like, 'Wow, that's intense. Go to therapy.' But you know, it's a result of how much I've been through. Just because you're on Disney Channel and you always have a smile on your face, they think you're perfect, and it's obvious that nobody's life really is."

— Demi Lovato on her songwriting

In September 2007, Lovato began writing the songs with the Jonas Brothers, during the filming of Camp Rock. In early 2008, they co-wrote ten songs in a week during the band's Look Me in the Eyes Tour. Lovato said, "I wrote it with them and they helped me. They obviously knew the situation, and then we got on the bus one night — songs just started pouring out." Before the tour's European leg, they went to the studio where the band co-produced the songs with John Fields. Speaking of the experience of co-producing, Nick Jonas said: "Being able to co-produce was really cool and definitely something we'll be doing a lot more of." Nick also complimented working with Lovato. The album was recorded in ten and a half days in Fields' home studio in May 2008.

The inspiration behind "Get Back", a Jonas-penned track, was Lovato not wanting to write a mean or heartbroken song as she felt that there was enough of them. Instead, Lovato wanted to write about getting back together with an old boyfriend. "It's kind of a fun, upbeat song and it's kind of just fun to sing to the person that I wrote it about", Lovato said of the song. "La La Land" was written by Lovato and the Jonas Brothers about "the pressures of fame". Lovato said, "You get to Hollywood and a lot of times people can try to shape you and mould you into what they want you to be. The song is just about keeping it real and trying to stay yourself when you're out in Hollywood". "Don't Forget", was written by Lovato and the Jonas Brothers, the song is about Lovato's experience of falling in love with someone who "just walks away and goes somewhere else". "I went through an experience like that and wanted to write about it. I got over it, and now a year later I don't have those feelings about that person anymore", Lovato said. Musical influences for the album included Paramore, Kelly Clarkson, Christina Aguilera, Billy Gillman, Aretha Franklin and Gladys Knight.

The album's final track listing consisted of six songs co-written by the Jonas Brothers, including the duet "On the Line". The remainder of the album was produced by Fields. Lovato enlisted Rooney frontman Robert Coppola Schwartzman for the track "Party", stating that Lovato put their "musical input and lyrics" into the song and Schwartzman helped Lovato, mainly on the hook. Lovato wrote the song "Trainwreck" alone and co-wrote most of the remaining tracks, except for "The Middle", written by Fields, Kara DioGuardi and Jason Reeves, and "Until You're Mine", written by Andy Dodd and Adam Watts.

== Composition ==
"La La Land"
The opening track, "La La Land", is a guitar-driven pop rock and pop-punk song with lyrics about feeling "out of place" in Hollywood.

"Don't Forget"
"Don't Forget" is a midtempo glam rock ballad that shows a more mature side of Lovato's.

The album has been described as a genre-hopping rock record incorporating styles of power pop and pop-punk. Stephen Thomas Erlewine of Allmusic wrote that it includes "bright, sugary, snappy power pop, fueled by big, fuzzy guitars and big, muscular hooks." Nick Levine stated that "this is an album of cute, catchy bubblegum rock songs about typical teen issues: staying true to yourself, making up and breaking up, lusting over someone unattainable" As most of the album was co-written and co-produced by the Jonas Brothers, critics noted a similar sound between the artists. Erlewine noted that, unlike the Jonas Brothers' album A Little Bit Longer, the album does not attempt to draw an audience broader than the tween demographic, calling it "pure, unapologetic bubblegum". The lyrics of the songs deal with teen issues, such as being independent or heartbroken. Digital Spy's Nick Levine wrote that recurring themes include; "staying true to yourself, making up and breaking up, [and] lusting over someone unattainable." The opening track, "La La Land", is about Lovato feeling "out of place" in Hollywood, demonstrated in the verses, "Who said I can't wear my Converse with my dress?", and "I'm not a supermodel, I still eat McDonald's."

The next track, "Get Back", is a guitar-driven upbeat 1980s power pop song. The track speaks of wanting to get back together with an old boyfriend. "On the Line", a duet with the Jonas Brothers, is a breakup song described as bubblegum with a "fizzy" singalong hook. "Don't Forget", shows a transition from the album's tween pop into more mature glam rock. The song is a midtempo power ballad and features Lovato singing with breathy vocals in a falsetto tone. According to Joey Guerra of Houston Chronicle, "Trainwreck" and "Gonna Get Caught" include Beatles-esque melodies. "Trainwreck" contains references to medication. "Two Worlds Collide" is about a young couple who finds strength from their shared dreams. The ninth track, "The Middle", is about Lovato being eager to go for a ride with a guy, and willing to "crash" and "fall" just for the thrill of it. In "Until You're Mine", Lovato is desperate to "fill an emotional vacancy with a boy". Michael Slezak of Entertainment Weekly wrote that the closing track, "Believe in Me", includes "platitudes that might as well have been penned by Dora the Explorer."

== Promotion ==
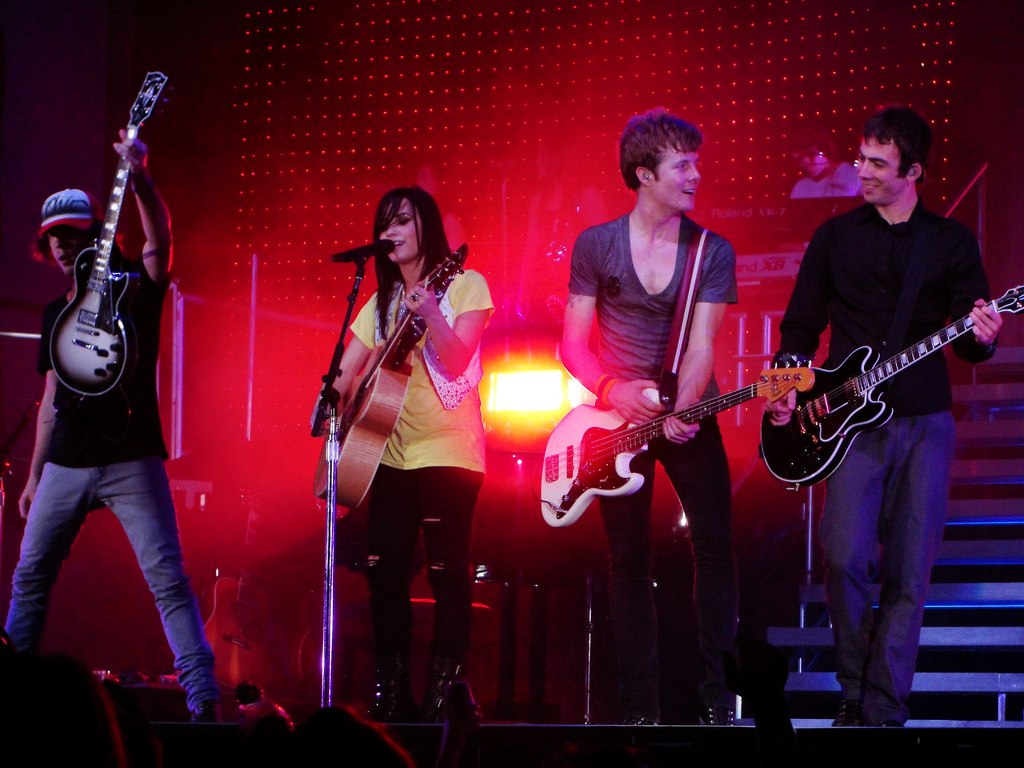
Lovato performing with her band in Columbus, Ohio as part of her 2009 tour

As a part of promotion, Lovato performed tracks from the album on several televised appearances and occasions. Lovato performed "Get Back" for the first time at the 2008 Disney Channel Games on May 3, 2008. Later, Lovato performed the same song in Good Morning America and The Ellen DeGeneres Show. Later on January 19, 2009, she performed "Get Back" and "La La Land" at the Kids' Inaugural: "We Are the Future" event on January 19, 2009, in Washington D.C. at the Verizon Center. The event was held to celebrate the inauguration of Barack Obama as President of the United States. On April 7, 2009, Lovato performed "La La Land" on the eighth season of Dancing with the Stars. The same month, Lovato also performed "Don't Forget" on The Ellen DeGeneres Show. On April 25, 2009, Lovato appeared on the final episode of singing competition My Camp Rock, where she presented the award to the winner and performed "La La Land".

Apart from the live performances, Lovato embarked on her first headlining tour Demi Live! Warm Up Tour in 2008 and continued with Demi Lovato: Live in Concert in 2009, with dates in North America. After days of speculation on blogs and fansites, it was confirmed on April 15, 2009 that David Archuleta would serve as the tour's opening act. Lovato announced it on her Myspace blog, where Lovato also wrote, "I'm so excited about headlining my own tour. I love life on the road. I'm in a different city every night, and it never gets old." Singer Jordan Pruitt and girl group KSM joined on select dates. Tickets for the tour went on sale on April 25, 2009, and a special pre-sale offer was made available through Lovato's newly-launched official fan club on April 15. Lovato said of the tour, "I've always dreamed of headlining my own tour, and it's so exciting to have that dream come true. I'm looking forward to seeing all my incredible and supportive fans, and play new music for them." The tour launched on June 21, 2009 at XL Center in Hartford, Connecticut and was originally supposed to run forty-seven dates through August. The last three dates were rescheduled for October and November 2009, and three other dates were canceled completely, making it 44 concerts in total. The tour was produced by AEG Live and sponsored by AT&T and Choice Hotels.

== Singles ==
"Get Back" was released on August 12, 2008, as the lead single from the album, through digital distribution. It received positive reviews from critics, who compared it to works by Tommy Tutone and Greg Kihn. "Get Back" enjoyed little chart success, reaching number 43 in the United States and 93 in Canada. The song's accompanying music video was directed by Philip Andelman and shows Lovato and her band performing the song on top of an abandoned building with Manhattan Bridge in the background. The song has sold over 560,000 copies in the United States.

"La La Land" was released on December 18, 2008, as the second single from the album. The song received positive reviews from critics, who noted it as one of the album's top tracks. "La La Land" reached number 52 in the United States and cracked the top 40 in Ireland and the United Kingdom. The music video was directed by Brendan Malloy and Tim Wheeler and was used to promote Lovato's sitcom Sonny with a Chance, featuring appearances by her co-stars.

"Don't Forget" was released on March 17, 2009 as the third and final single from the album. It debuted on the Billboard Hot 100 at number sixty-eight on October 11, 2008 and fell off the chart the following week. On April 4, 2009, it re-entered the chart at number eighty-four. The song steadily ascended the chart for three weeks, before eventually reaching a peak of number forty-one on its fifth week on the chart. It was Lovato's best performing solo song on the chart until "Here We Go Again" reached number fifteen on August 8, 2009. In Canada, "Don't Forget" debuted on the Canadian Hot 100 at number eighty-two on May 2, 2009. The next week, it reached seventy-six, which became its peak. The song also reached number sixty-two on the now defunct Pop 100 chart.

== Critical reception ==
Professional ratings
Review scores
Source	Rating
Absolute Punk	(7.1/10)
AllMusic	4/5 stars
Digital Spy	3/5 stars
Entertainment Weekly	C

Don't Forget was met with generally positive reviews from critics. Stephen Thomas Erlewine of AllMusic wrote a positive review of the album, calling it "pure pop for tween people". He said that the "parade of urgent, insistent guitar pop" is what makes the album memorable, stating, "the kind of pop that feels disposable but winds up sticking around longer than its more considered cousins. This kind of trashy fun was missing on A Little Bit Longer, so it's nice to find that it surfaces proudly on Don't Forget." Nick Levine of Digital Spy noted that the album sounds "like a female-fronted Jonas Brothers". Levine was positive regarding Lovato's vocals on the album, saying that "she is certainly a stronger singer than the Jonases. In fact, her full-bodied vocal performances are consistently impressive." He noted that the album's "relatively risqué moments [...] come on the tracks that the Jonases have nothing to do with." Levine rated the album three out of five stars and wrote "None of its eleven songs is terrific, but none is terrible either, and Lovato makes a good first impression, coming off like a more innocent, less try-hard Katy Perry."

Joey Guerra of Houston Chronicle stated that the album "casts Lovato as a female counterpart to the Jonas Brothers". Guerra was mixed regarding Lovato's vocal delivery on the album, calling it "at times too earnest". He also noted that "her rock tendencies sometimes dwindle into unmelodic misses". He concluded his review, writing, "at 16 years old, Lovato should be allowed some wide-eyed wiggle room. Don't Forget does its job and leaves her room to grow." Michael Slezak of Entertainment Weekly graded the album a C and wrote, "The Camp Rock star Demi Lovato's debut album might be an indication that today's crop of rocker grrrls [sic] are taking their inspiration from Ashlee Simpson rather than, say, Janis Joplin."

== Commercial performance ==
Don't Forget debuted at number two on the US Billboard 200, selling 89,000 copies in its first week of release. This marked Lovato’s first top 10 and top 5 spot on the Billboard 200. The following week, the album descended to number 16. It spent a total of 45 weeks on the Billboard 200 chart. The album was certified gold by the Recording Industry Association of America (RIAA) for sales of over 500,000 copies in the United States.

In Canada, the album debuted at number nine on the Canadian Albums Chart on October 11, 2008, and spent two weeks on the chart. On April 26, 2009, Don't Forget entered the Spanish Albums Chart at number 13. The album spent a total of 23 weeks on the chart and its last appearance was on the issue dated September 27, 2009. The album debuted at number 34 on the New Zealand Albums Chart on February 23, 2009 and remained at the same position for another week before falling off. On May 2, 2009, Don't Forget made its debut at number 192 on the UK Albums Chart.

== Track listing ==
Standard edition
No.	Title	Writer(s)	Producer(s)	Length
1.	"La La Land"	Demi Lovato; Nick Jonas; Joe Jonas; Kevin Jonas II	John Fields; Jonas Brothers	3:16
2.	"Get Back"	Lovato; N. Jonas; J. Jonas; Jonas II	Fields; Jonas Brothers	3:20
3.	"Trainwreck"	Lovato	Fields	3:17
4.	"Party"	Lovato; Fields; Robert Schwartzman	Fields	3:53
5.	"On the Line" (featuring Jonas Brothers)	Lovato; N. Jonas; J. Jonas; Jonas II	Fields; Jonas Brothers	3:26
6.	"Don't Forget"	Lovato; N. Jonas; J. Jonas; Jonas II	Fields; Jonas Brothers	3:43
7.	"Gonna Get Caught"	Lovato; N. Jonas; J. Jonas; Jonas II	Fields; Jonas Brothers	3:11
8.	"Two Worlds Collide"	Lovato; N. Jonas; J. Jonas; Jonas II	Fields; Jonas Brothers	3:18
9.	"The Middle"	Kara DioGuardi; Fields; Jason Reeves	Fields	3:05
10.	"Until You're Mine"	Adam Watts; Andy Dodd	Fields	3:31
11.	"Believe in Me"	Lovato; Fields; DioGuardi	Fields	3:42
Total length:				37:42

International digital edition
No.	Title	Length
12.	"Back Around"	3:10
Total length:		40:52

Deluxe edition
No.	Title	Writer(s)	Producer(s)	Length
12.	"Behind Enemy Lines"	Lovato; N. Jonas; J. Jonas; Jonas II	Fields; Jonas Brothers	2:50
13.	"Lo Que Soy" (Spanish version of "This Is Me")	Watts; Dodd	Dodd; Watts	3:28
Total length:				44:00

=== Notes ===
- Japanese edition includes the Caramel Pod D Remix of "La La Land" and music videos of "La La Land" and "Get Back" as enhanced content.
- Target edition includes forty minutes long "Live in Concert" DVD.
- Deluxe edition also includes DVD section which features various behind the scenes and backstage footage, music videos of "La La Land" and "Get Back" and a live performance of "Don't Forget".

== Personnel ==
Credits adapted from the liner notes of Don't Forget.

=== Performers and musicians ===
- Demi Lovato – lead vocals, guitar (track 6, 8), piano (track 3, 11)
- Nick Jonas – lead vocals (track 5), guitar (tracks 1–2, 5–8), background vocals (tracks 1–2, 7), keyboard (track 5), drums (track 5, 7), percussion (track 6)
- Joe Jonas – lead vocals (track 5), background vocals (tracks 1–2, 7)
- Kevin Jonas – guitar (tracks 1–2, 5, 7), background vocals (tracks 1–2, 7)
- John Fields – guitar, bass, keyboard
- John Taylor – guitar (tracks 1–2), background vocals (tracks 1–2, 7)
- Will Owsley – guitar (track 3, 5, 7), background vocals (track 3)
- Robert Schwartzman – background vocals (track 4)
- Kara DioGuardi – background vocals (track 9)
- Devin Bronson – guitar solo (track 1)
- Jason Reeves – guitar (track 9)
- Tim Pierce – guitar (track 10)
- Dorian Crozier – drums (tracks 1, 3, 6, 8–10)
- Jack Lawless – drums (track 2)
- Michael Bland – drums (track 4, 6, 11)
- Ken Chastain – percussion (track 3, 11)
- Tommy Barbarella – organ (track 4), keyboard (track 10)
- Stephen Lu – keyboard (track 5, 8, 10)

=== Production ===
- John Fields – production, programming
- Jonas Brothers – production (tracks 1–2, 5–8)
- Chris Lord-Alge – mixing
- Nik Karpin – assistant mixing
- Ted Jensen – mastering
- Ken Chastain – programming (track 3, 11)
- Stephen Lu – string arrangement (track 5, 8, 10)

=== Design and management ===
- Jon Lind – A&R
- Cindy Warden – A&R coordination
- Phil McIntyre – management
- Kevin Jonas, Sr. – management
- Eddie De La Garza – management
- Dave Snow – creative director
- Gavin Taylor – art direction, design
- Sheryl Nields – photography

== Charts ==
=== Weekly charts ===
Chart (2008–09)	Peak position
Australian Albums (ARIA)	161
Canadian Albums (Billboard)	9
Irish Albums (IRMA)	84
Italian Albums (FIMI)	77
Japanese Albums (Oricon)	116
Mexican Albums (AMPROFON)	62
New Zealand Albums (RIANZ)	34
Polish Albums (OLiS)	43
Spanish Albums (PROMUSICAE)	13
UK Albums (OCC)	120
US Billboard 200	2

=== Year-end charts ===
Chart (2009)	Position
US Billboard 200	133

== Certifications ==
Region	Certification	Certified units/sales
United States (RIAA)	Gold	549,000

== Release history ==
Region	Date	Edition	Format(s)	Label	Ref.
Canada	September 23, 2008	Standard	CD; digital download	Universal Music	
United States	September 23, 2008	Standard	CD; digital download	Hollywood	
Japan	February 18, 2009	Standard	CD	Avex Trax	
United States	March 31, 2009	Deluxe	CD	Hollywood	
Canada	March 31, 2009	Deluxe	CD	Hollywood	
United Kingdom	April 16, 2009	Standard	Digital download	Universal Music	
Australia	April 19, 2009	Standard	Digital download	Universal Music	
United Kingdom	April 20, 2009	Standard	CD	Polydor	
Various	May 29, 2020	Standard	Vinyl	Hollywood	
