= Disney Girlz Rock 2 =

Compilation album by Various artists
- Released: September 9, 2008
- Recorded: 2006–2008
- Genres: Pop; pop rock; teen pop
- Label: Walt Disney

Disney Girlz Rock album chronology
Disney Girlz Rock (2005)	Disney Girlz Rock 2 (2008)

Professional ratings
Review scores
Source	Rating
Allmusic	N/A

Disney Girlz Rock 2 is a follow-up to the 2005 compilation of the same name. It includes some of the most popular female Disney artists like Miley Cyrus, Demi Lovato, Vanessa Hudgens, Ashley Tisdale, and Selena Gomez, as well as former Disney-turned-mainstream teen-pop acts and girl groups such as Hilary Duff and Aly & AJ. This album also contains a song by KSM. The CD was released on September 9, 2008. The album contains mostly songs that have been used on Disney Channel films and television series, as well as songs from artists that have received airplay on Radio Disney.

== Track listing ==
No.	Title	Writer(s)	From	Length
1.	"Start All Over" (Miley Cyrus)	Scott Cutler; Anne Preven; Fefe Dobson	Meet Miley Cyrus	3:24
2.	"Fuego" (The Cheetah Girls)	Jonathan Rotem; E. Kidd Bogart; Élan Rivera; Lionel Richie	TCG	2:53
3.	"Let's Dance" (Vanessa Hudgens)	Matthew Gerrard; Bridget Benenate; Jonas Jeberg	V	3:19
4.	"Hero in You" (KSM)	Gerrard; Robbie Nevil		3:23
5.	"I Don't Think About It" (Emily Osment)	Ilene Angel; Sue Fabisch	The Haunting Hour: Don't Think About It	2:58
6.	"Rock Star" (Hannah Montana)	Aristeidis Archontis; Chen Neeman; Jeannie Lurie	Hannah Montana 2	3:19
7.	"This Is Me (Extended acoustic version)" (Demi Lovato)	Andy Dodd; Adam Watts	Camp Rock	2:59
8.	"Cruella de Vil" (Selena Gomez)	Mel Leven	Disneymania 6	3:28
9.	"Try" (Hayden Panettiere)	Gerrard; Nevil; Mike Krompass	Bridge to Terabithia	3:22
10.	"Too Cool" (Meaghan Jette Martin)	Pam Sheyne; Toby Gad	Camp Rock	3:28
11.	"Like Whoa" (Aly & AJ)	Alyson Michalka; Amanda Michalka; Antonina Armato; Tim Price	Minutemen	2:30
12.	"I Wanna Go Back" (Jordan Pruitt)	Monty Byrom; Danny Chauncey; Ira Walker	Permission to Fly	2:49
13.	"Double Dutch Bus" (Raven-Symoné)	Franklyn Smith; William A. Bloom	College Road Trip	3:02
14.	"Fabulous" (Ashley Tisdale and Lucas Grabeel)	David Lawrence; Faye Greenberg	High School Musical 2	3:01
15.	"With Love" (Hilary Duff)	Duff; Kara DioGuardi; Vada Nobles; Julius Diaz	Dignity	3:12
