= Read Between the Lines (KSM album) =

Studio album by KSM
- Released: September 22, 2009
- Genres: Pop rock; pop punk; teen pop
- Length: 42:38
- Labels: Walt Disney, Buena Vista
- Producers: Matthew Gerrard and Robbie Nevil

Singles from Read Between the Lines
- 1. "Read Between the Lines" Released: 2009; 2. "I Want You to Want Me" Released: 2009; 3. "Distracted" Released: 2010

Read Between the Lines is the only studio album by the American pop rock band KSM. It was released on September 22, 2009, by Buena Vista and Walt Disney Records. The band toured with Demi Lovato to support the album. The album was produced and mostly written by Matthew Gerrard and Robbie Nevil. The album also includes a cover version of "I Want You to Want Me" by Cheap Trick, which was used to promote the new television series 10 Things I Hate About You on the ABC Family network.

== Track listing ==
All tracks are written by Matthew Gerrard and Robbie Nevil, except where noted.

No.	Title	Writer(s)	Length
1.	"Don't Rain on My Parade"		3:16
2.	"Crazy Over You"	Greg Critchley; Gerrard; Nevil	3:18
3.	"Read Between the Lines"		2:59
4.	"Everytime You Go"		3:13
5.	"Saturdays and Sundays"		2:59
6.	"Permission to Party"		3:42
7.	"Distracted"		3:18
8.	"Unpredictable"		3:10
9.	"Don't Come Crying to Me"		3:14
10.	"Best Friends Forever"		3:39
11.	"Slow Motion"		3:24
12.	"2 Guitars Bass and a Drum"	Steve Diamond; Gerrard; Nevil	2:58
13.	"I Want You to Want Me"	Rick Nielsen	3:22

== Reception ==
Professional ratings
Review scores
Source	Rating
AllMusic	3.5/5 stars

"Read Between the Lines," the title track and first single off the album, was named iTunes Single of the Week at the time of the album's release. Billboard's album review refers to the band as a G-rated version of the Go-Go's but with the same "distinctive individual looks, spunky stage presence and monster riffs". The review calls Avril Lavigne the band's "closest cousin", but with more punk energy, and says that "the act's rock rings harder and truer than Miley Cyrus." Jason Thurston of AllMusic says "the five girls pull it off with panache, finishing the songs off with a 2000s teen pop gloss, or sometimes a '90s girl-ska-punk". Other reviews were not as favorable. While comparing the band's sound to No Doubt, lead singer Shelby Cobra's vocals are called "limited" and on the "worst squeaky side of Gwen Stefani."

== Personnel ==
- Shelby Cobra – lead vocals
- Shae Padilla – lead guitar
- Katie Cecil – rhythm guitar, backing vocals
- Sophia Melon – bass guitar, backing vocals
- Kate Cabebe – drums, percussion
