= Cassie Steele =

Canadian actress and singer (born 1989)

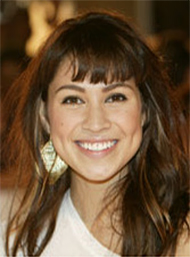
- Steele at the 2007 Toronto International Film Festival
- Born: Cassandra Rae Steele; December 2, 1989 (age 36); Toronto, Ontario, Canada
- Occupations: Actress; singer; songwriter
- Years active: 2001–present
- Spouse: Trent Garrett (m. 2018; div. 2021)
- Partner: Favi Martinez
- Children: 1
- Musical career
- Genres: Grunge; alternative rock; indie pop; indie rock
- Label: INgrooves

Cassandra Rae Steele (born December 2, 1989) is a Canadian actress and singer known for portraying Manny Santos on Degrassi: The Next Generation and Abby Vargas on The L.A. Complex. In 2014, she played Sarah in the MTV horror television movie The Dorm. She also voices Tammy Gueterman and Tricia Lange in Adult Swim's Rick and Morty.

== Early life ==
Steele was born Cassandra Rae Steele on December 2, 1989 in Toronto, Ontario, Canada and is of English descent on her father's side and Filipina descent on her mother's side. She has a younger sister, Alex Steele who acted alongside her in Degrassi: The Next Generation. She began crafting her own songs to go with her poetry when she was in the first grade, she then began taking singing lessons. She attended London School of Dance in Scarborough, Ontario, and trained in ballet and jazz dance. She was also a gymnast for an unspecified amount of time.

== Career ==
=== 2001–2010: Degrassi: The Next Generation and early work ===
In 2001, Steele first appeared in a Fib Finder commercial alongside Cristine Rotenberg. She later, that year, appeared on an episode of Relic Hunter as the ten-year-old version of Sydney Fox.

Since she was eleven years old, Steele appeared as a regular cast member on Degrassi: The Next Generation playing the character of Manny Santos. She played the role for nine years, before exiting the show in 2010. She has also appeared in three Degrassi TV films: Degrassi Spring Break Movie, Degrassi Goes Hollywood and Degrassi Takes Manhattan.

During the filming of Degrassi, Steele also starred in the Disney film Full Court Miracle as well as the MTV movie Super Sweet 16: The Movie and My Babysitter's a Vampire and had recurring roles in The Best Years and Instant Star.

Steele has also embarked on a music career. Her debut album, How Much for Happy, was released in 2005, followed by two Canadian tours. Steele's follow-up album, Destructo Doll, was released on July 21, 2009. She appeared on Channel One News to promote the album for the music segment.

=== 2011–present: The L.A. Complex and other projects ===
In 2011, Steele was cast as Abby Vargas in the series The L.A. Complex, which premiered on CTV and Much Music on January 10, 2012, and aired regularly on Much Music. On the same day as the premiere, the series was officially picked up by The CW to begin airing in the United States in the spring. It was renewed for a second season, which aired simultaneously on both Much Music and The CW that summer. The L.A. Complex was officially cancelled on December 20, 2012.

On April 17, 2012, Steele released the extended-play "Shifty" to iTunes. On April 1, 2014, her single "Mad" was released to iTunes. The official lyric video premiered on her VEVO page one day prior.

Since 2014, she has had recurring role on the adult animated series Rick and Morty as Tammy Guetermann and Tricia Lange. She starred as Valerie Vont in the Lifetime film Sorority Surrogate with fellow Degrassi star Daniel Kelly, which was released on March 22, 2014. She would appear as Sarah in the film The Dorm later that year.

On August 12, 2014, Steele released the album "Patterns" to iTunes. The official video for "Games" was released the same year on September 1, and it premiered on her VEVO page. Steele released the single "Power" shortly afterwards. It was released to iTunes on October 21, 2014.

In 2018, she appeared in Drake's I'm Upset music video, which takes place during a Degrassi reunion.

Steele started the band "psychocandy" with Glint member Jase Blankfort in August 2019. Their single "Hunger" is available to stream on SoundCloud. On January 1, 2020, the band posted a photo on a new account on Instagram with the caption "2020."

In 2019, it was reported that Steele would voice the titular character in the Disney film Raya and the Last Dragon. On August 27, 2020, however, Steele was replaced by Kelly Marie Tran.

In 2022, Steele released a sustainable thong line in collaboration with designer Rachael Finley. The clothing line was inspired by Steele's infamous outfit in Degrassi, where Manny arrives to school wearing a visible thong.

== Personal life ==
Steele married American actor Trent Garrett in 2018. In December 2020, Garrett filed for divorce from Steele.

Steele's first child, a son, was born in November 2023 with boyfriend Favi Martinez. They reside in Colorado.

Her sister is actress Alex Steele, who also starred on Degrassi: The Next Generation as Angela Jeremiah and Tori Santamaria.

== Discography ==
=== Albums ===
Album Information
How Much for Happy
- Released: March 15, 2005 (CAN)
  April 26, 2005 (US)
- Label: Bullseye Canada, Rob'N'Steal Productions
- Canadian sales: 25,000
- Canadian Certification: Gold
- Official Singles:
  - 2005: "Bluebird"
  - 2005: "Famous"
Destructo Doll
- Released: July 21, 2009
- Label: Independent, Rob'N'Steal Productions
- Canadian sales: 25,000
- Canadian Certification: Gold
- Official Singles
  - 2009: "Mr. Colson"
  - 2009: "Go Dark"

=== EPs ===
Album Information
Shifty
- Released: April 17, 2012
- Label: Independent
Patterns
- Released: August 12, 2014
- Label: Independent

=== Other songs ===
- "Things That God Cannot Explain" (2005)
- "Pavement" (2008) (featured on Songs from Instant Star 4)
- "Crash My Party" (2009) (featured on Degrassi Goes Hollywood: Music from the Original Movie)
- "Life Is a Show" (2009) (featured on Degrassi Goes Hollywood: Music from the Original Movie)
- "One Saturday Night Away" (2009) (featured on Degrassi Goes Hollywood: Music from the Original Movie; with the cast of Degrassi Goes Hollywood)
- "Something Sexy" (2010) (single release)
- "I Trust You" (2010) (featured on Degrassi Takes Manhattan: The Heat Is On (Music from the Original Movie); with fictional band The Studs)
- "Grain" (2010) (single release)
- "Mad" (2014) (single release)
- "Power" (2014) (single release)

== Filmography ==
=== Film ===
Year	Title	Role	Notes
2004	Full-Court Miracle	Julie	Television movie
2007	Super Sweet 16: The Movie	Sophie	Television movie
2008	Degrassi Spring Break Movie	Manny Santos	Television movie
2009	Degrassi Goes Hollywood	Manny Santos	Television movie
2010	Degrassi Takes Manhattan	Manny Santos	Television movie
2010	My Babysitter's a Vampire	Rochelle	Television movie
2014	Sorority Surrogate	Valerie Vont	Television movie
2014	The Dorm	Sarah	Television movie
2015	Shark Island	Amber Steele	Television movie; also known as "Zombie Shark"
2016	Twist of Fate	Kelly	Television movie
2017	Mississippi River Sharks	Tara	Television movie
2019	Paint it Red	Lana	
2021	Eternal Nightmare Machine	Tammy Gueterman, Tricia Lange	Voice; Short film
TBA	Quiet in My Town †	Sally	Post-production

=== Television ===
Year	Title	Role	Notes
2001	Relic Hunter	Sydney Fox - Age 10	Episode: "Sydney at Ten"
2001–2010	Degrassi: The Next Generation	Manny Santos	Main role (season 1–9); 128 episodes
2004	Doc	Heidi Euchi	Episode: "No Pain, No Gain"
2007	The Best Years	Lucy Ramirez-Montoya	Recurring role; 3 episodes
2007	'Da Kink in My Hair	Girl	Episode: "Fass & Facety"
2008	Instant Star	Blu	Recurring role; 5 episodes
2012	The L.A. Complex	Abby Vargas	Lead role
2014–present	Rick and Morty	Tammy Gueterman, Tricia Lange	Recurring role; 16 episodes

=== Music videos ===
Year	Title	Artist
2018	"I'm Upset"	Drake

== Audio roles ==
=== Video games ===
Year	Title	Role	Notes
2016	Accounting	Skeleton Girl / Second Little Public Defender	
2017	Accounting+	Skeltal Girl / Ging	
2019	Trover Saves the Universe	Upgrade Tina / Soap Opera Woman / Answering Machine Girlfriend	
2022	High on Life	Additional voices	

=== Audio dramas ===
Year	Title	Role	Notes
2019	Rose Drive	Rayne	Episode: "The Children of the Harvest"
