= Allison Liddi-Brown =

American television director

- Born: Allison Liddi
- Occupation: Television director
- Years active: 1984–present

Allison Liddi-Brown is an American television director and producer.

Liddi-Brown received her B.A. in Drama and her M.F.A. in Directing from the University of California, Irvine, where she studied under Professor Keith Fowler. She made her television directorial debut on the first season of the Nickelodeon series, The Secret World of Alex Mack. She then went on to direct episodes for a number of notable television series namely, The Mystery Files of Shelby Woo, Xena: Warrior Princess, Beverly Hills, 90210, Star Trek: Voyager, Even Stevens, CSI: Crime Scene Investigation, CSI: Miami, CSI: NY, Chuck, Grey's Anatomy, Friday Night Lights and Gossip Girl among other series.

In 2010, Brown won the Directors Guild of America award for Outstanding Directorial Achievement in a Children's Program for directing the Disney Channel Original Movie Princess Protection Program starring Selena Gomez and Demi Lovato.

== Filmography ==
TV series

Television
Year	Tile	Notes
1994–1997	The Secret World of Alex Mack	8 episodes
1997	Beyond Belief: Fact or Fiction	Episode "Needle Point/Toy to the Rescue/Mystery Lock/The House on Baker Street/The Train" (segment 2 and 4)
1997–1998	The Mystery Files of Shelby Woo	10 episodes
1998	The Journey of Allen Strange	Episode "Haunted
1998–1999	Cousin Skeeter	Episodes "Tyrannosaurus Wrecked" and "Sideshow Skeeter
1999	Xena: Warrior Princess	Episode "Little Problems"
1999–2000	Beverly Hills, 90210	Episodes "Family Tree" and "Spring Fever"
2000	Star Trek: Voyager	Episode "Collective"
2000	Even Stevens	Episodes "What'll Idol Do?" and "All About Yvette
2000	100 Deeds for Eddie McDowd	Episode "Fur Better or Worse"
2001	CSI: Crime Scene Investigation	Episode "Organ Grinder"
2002	Watching Ellie	Episode "Zimmerman"
2002	Roswell	Episode "Graduation"
2002	Family Affair	Episode "Skivvies"
2002	For the People	Episode "Dog Day"
2002	The Bernie Mac Show	Episode "Welcome to the Jungle"
2002	Do Over	Episode "Cold War"
2002–2004	Strong Medicine	4 episodes
2003	Miss Match	Episodes "Something Nervy" and "Forgive and Forget"
2003	The Twilight Zone	Episodes "How Much Do You Love Your Kid?" and "Developing"
2003	Boston Public	Episode "Chapter Seventy-Three"
2003–2004	Ed	4 episodes
2004–2007	Las Vegas	5 episodes
2004–2007	Unfabulous	10 episodes
2005	Boston Legal	Episode "Schmidt Happens"
2005	Monk	Episode "Mr. Monk and the Election"
2005	Summerland	Episode "House"
2005	Sex, Love & Secrets	Episode "Danger"
2006	Pepper Dennis	Episodes "Saving Dennis", "Hiroshi Watanabe in Bed with Curtis Wilson", and "Pepper Dennis Behind Bars"
2006	What About Brian	Episode "What About the Wedding"
2006	Brothers & Sisters	Episode "Date Night"
2006–2007	The 4400	Episodes "The Starzl Mutation" and "Tiny Machines"
2006–2011	Friday Night Lights	6 episodes
2007	Side Order of Life	Episode "When Pigs Fly"
2007	Journeyman	Episode "The Legend of Dylan McCleen"
2007–2008	Chuck	Episodes "Chuck Versus the Nemesis" and "Chuck Versus the Gravitron"
2007–2010	Army Wives	5 episodes
2008	Crash	Episode "Railroaded"
2008–2014	Bones	5 episodes
2009	My Name Is Earl	Episode "Friends with Benefits"
2009–2011	Gossip Girl	Episodes "Remains of the J" and "Shattered Bass"
2009–2012	CSI: Miami	6 episodes
2009–2019	Grey's Anatomy	6 episodes
2009–2012	Private Practice	5 episodes
2010–2013	CSI: NY	5 episodes
2010–2013	Royal Pains	4 episodes
2010–2015	Parenthood	6 episodes
2012	Pan Am	Episode "Secrets and Lies"
2012	666 Park Avenue	Episode "Diabolic"
2012–2018	Scandal	9 episodes
2013–2015	Hawaii Five-0	Episodes "Hau'oli La Ho'omoaika'i" and "E 'Imi pono"
2013–2015	Revenge	3 episodes
2015	The Night Shift	Episode "Aftermath"
2015	Battle Creek	Episode "Stocklholm"
2015	Wicked City	Episode "Blizzard of Ozz"
2016	Heartbeat	4 episodes; 9 episodes as co-executive producer
2016	Roadies	Episode "Friends and Family
2016	Shameless	Episode "You Sold Me the Laundromat, Remember?"
2017	The Catch	Episode "The Family Way"
2017	Transparent	Episodes "Groin Anomaly" and "Pinkwashing Machine"; 10 episodes of co-executive producer
2018–2022	The Good Doctor	4 episodes
2018	Rise	Episode "Bring Me Stanton"
2018	Shameless	Episode "Face It, You're Gorgeous"
2018	The Gifted	Episode "gaMe changer"
2018–2019	Marvel's Runaways	Episodes "Gimme Shelter" and "Lord of Lies"
2019	The Passage	Episode "Whose Blood is That?"
2019–2021	SEAL Team	5 episodes
2019–2021	Magnum P.I.	3 episodes
2019	The L Word: Generation Q	Episode "Less Is More"
2020	New Amsterdam	Episode "Double Blind"
2021	Station 19	2 episodes
2021	Rebel	Episode "Heart Burned"
2023	CSI: Vegas	Episode "Eyeballs"

TV movies

- Crazy (2005)
- Princess Protection Program (2009)
- Sea of Fire (2014)

Herself

- The WIN Awards (2005)

== Awards and nominations ==
Year	Nominated work	Event	Award	Result
2010	Princess Protection Program - with Carlos Aníbal Vázquez (unit production manager), Jose Gilberto Molinari-Rosaly (first assistant director), Colleen Comer (second assistant director)	Directors Guild of America Award	Outstanding Directing - Children's Programs	Won
2010	Friday Night Lights - episode "The Son" - with Rolin Jones (writer)	Gold Derby Awards	Best Drama Episode of the Year	Nominated
