= Destructo Doll =

Studio album by Cassie Steele
- Released: July 21, 2009
- Recorded: 2008–2009; Los Angeles, California; Malibu, California
- Genre: Grunge, Alternative rock
- Label: Independent, Rob'N'Steal Productions
- Producer: SuperSpy (Isaac Hasson & Mher Filian)

Cassie Steele chronology
| How Much for Happy (2005) | Destructo Doll (2009) |

Singles from Destructo Doll
- 1. "Mr. Colson" Released: April 23, 2009; 2. "Groupie (Digital Promo Only)" Released: August 1, 2009; 3. "Go Dark" Released: September 2009 (Cancelled)

Destructo Doll is the second studio album by Canadian actress and singer-songwriter Cassie Steele. It was released on July 21, 2009. Steele co-wrote or wrote all of the songs on Destructo Doll. It was announced on Cassie Steele's official fan website that "Go Dark" would be the second official single from the album.

== Recording ==
The album was recorded throughout 2008 and 2009 in California.

== Singles ==
"Mr. Colson"
'Mr. Colson' is the first single from the album. The music video was released on TeenNick's Website and on Cassie's YouTube channel.

"Groupie" (Promo/Digital only)
'Groupie' was released on iTunes as a digital single, removing an objectionable lyric. It was only a promo single.

"Go Dark"
'Go Dark' was announced as the official second single from the album, according to Cassie's official fan website and Twitter. Her Facebook team announced on September 18, 2009, that the filming of the music video had been completed. On September 29, 2009, a 45-second preview clip of the music video was added to YouTube on Cassie's official channel. It was announced on Cassie's official Twitter account that the music video for "Go Dark" will be released at the end of 2010 when her next album is released, however as of July 2018 the video has not been released.

== Track listing ==
1. "Groupie" – 2:58
2. "Mr. Colson" – 3:57
3. "Monster" – 3:07
4. "You and I" – 3:25
5. "Hollywood" – 5:05
6. "Check It" – 3:18
7. "Summer Nights" – 3:36
8. "Rock Star Beau" – 3:01
9. "Cliche" – 2:41
10. "Go Dark" – 5:06

Lyrics by Cassie Steele. Music by Cassie Steele, Isaac Hasson, Mher Filian.
