= KSM (band) =

American rock band

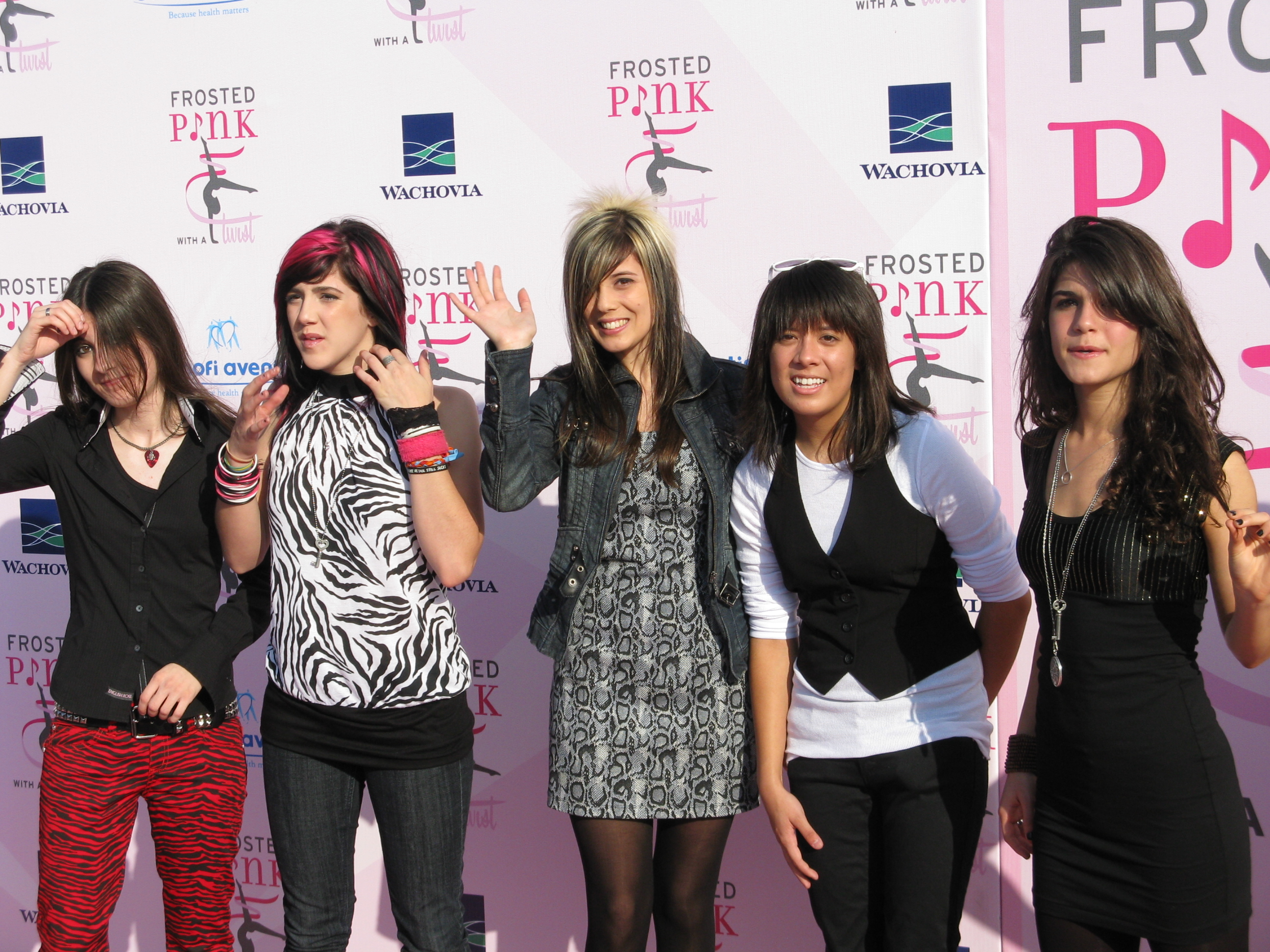
- KSM in San Diego, CA on September 15, 2008 (L-R: Shae Padilla, Katie Cecil, Shelby Cobra, Kate Cabebe, Sophia Melon)

Background information
- Origin: Los Angeles, California, United States
- Genres: Power pop, pop rock, pop punk, alternative rock
- Years active: 2006–2010
- Label: Walt Disney
- Past members: Kate Cabebe; Katie Cecil; Shae Padilla; Sophia Melon; Shelby Cobra

KSM was an American all-female pop rock band from Los Angeles, California that was active from 2006 to 2010. The band consisted of lead singer Shelby Cobra (real last name Spalione), lead guitarist Shae Padilla, rhythm guitarist Katie Cecil, bassist Sophia Melon and drummer Kate Cabebe.

They gained popularity in summer 2009 when they covered the song, "I Want You to Want Me" by Cheap Trick. The song was used to promote the television series 10 Things I Hate About You on the ABC Family network.

== History ==
=== 2006–2008: Formation ===
KSM was formed in a joint project between The Walt Disney Company and former chart-topping girl band The Go-Go's. The Go-Go's were looking for an all-girl pop band to mentor and held auditions in 2006. Four musicians (Padilla, Cecil, Cabebe, and Melon; all age 13–15 at the time) were selected and the group was originally developed as a Go-Go's cover band called the Po-Go's. Disney planned to replicate its success with Devo 2.0, a kids' version of the '80s new wave band Devo, with the possibility of the Po-Go's appearing in a movie or TV series. Eventually the band's sound was changed from pop to rock, and with the addition of lead singer Shelby Cobra (real last name Spalione) in February 2008, they changed their name to KSM. Around that time, the Go-Go's ended their involvement with the project.

=== 2009–2010: Read Between the Lines and disbandment ===
KSM were signed with Walt Disney Records (part of the Disney Music Group) and promoted through various Disney endeavors. They toured as an opening act for fellow Disney recording artists Mitchel Musso, Demi Lovato, and Jonas Brothers, as well as opening for Paramore and David Archuleta. KSM's journey as they approached and then supported the release of their debut album was documented in the bi-weekly reality web series called, KSM: Read Between the Lines which aired from August 10, 2009, to October 16, 2009, on www.teen.com. The 20-episode web series was produced by The Disney Music Group and The Jonas Group. On September 22, 2009, KSM released their debut album Read Between the Lines, which was written and produced by Matthew Gerrard and Robbie Nevil. KSM performed on Good Morning America on October 8, 2009 and on The Rachael Ray Show on October 12, 2009.

The band confirmed in April 2010 that bassist Sophia Melon departed to attend Barnard College. In August 2010 KSM confirmed that they had broken up to pursue separate careers. In October 2010, lead guitarist Shae Padilla formed a new hard rock band called Rixy Fisk, which briefly included Shelby Spalione (no longer using the "Cobra" stage name) on vocals. Padilla's band was later called FireSky, which released the EP Erase the Enemy in August 2011. Drummer Kate Cabebe attended California Lutheran University for an undergraduate degree in communication and Liberty University for a master's degree in developmental psychology. She has worked for Cambio.com as a correspondent and was a founder of nerd culture ministry nonprofit Love Thy Nerd. Spalione released the dance-pop single "Overrated Friday" under the name Lio in late 2011 and again under the name Shelby in early 2012; she has also performed with will.i.am. Rhythm guitarist Katie Cecil had been a child actress before KSM, and earned small roles in the TV series Medium, Criminal Minds, and Help Me Help You. Starting in 2015, Cecil became the lead singer for the indie-pop band Wayfarers.

== Band members ==
Former band members

- Shelby Cobra — lead vocals
- Shae Padilla — lead guitar
- Katie Cecil — rhythm guitar, backing vocals
- Sophia Melon — bass, backing vocals
- Kate Cabebe — drums

== Discography ==
=== Studio releases ===
- Read Between the Lines (DisneySound, 2009)
- I Want You To Want Me (Walt Disney Records/DisneySound, 2009) - one-track promo CD
- KSM Live at the Filmore New York at Irving Plaza [Live Nation Studios] (DisneySound)

=== Soundtrack and compilation appearances ===
- "Hero In You" from Disney Girlz Rock, Vol. 2 (Walt Disney Records, 2008)
- "Don't Rain On My Parade" from Jim's Picks 2009 2XCD (Universal/Fontana, 2008)
- "Distracted" and "Meet The Band" from Radio Disney Jams, Vol. 11 (Walt Disney Records, 2009)
- "Magic Carpet Ride" from Wizards of Waverly Place (Walt Disney Records, 2009)
- "Magic Carpet Ride" from Music from Cats & Dogs: The Revenge of Kitty Galore (Original Motion Picture Soundtrack) (Water Tower Music, 2010)
- "Good Enough" from DisneyMania 7 (Walt Disney Records, 2010)
- "Read Between The Lines" from It's Teen-Disney (Som Livre Disney, 2010)

== Music videos ==
List of music videos, showing year released and director(s)
Title	Year	Director(s)	Ref.
"Hero In You"	2008	None	
"I Want You to Want Me"	2009	Declan Whitebloom	
"I Want You to Want Me" (10 Things I Hate About You version)	2009	Declan Whitebloom	
"Read Between the Lines"	2009	Steven Murashige	
"Read Between the Lines" (I Heart Vampires version)	2009	None	

== Filmography ==
Year	Name	Role	Notes
2009	KSM: Read Between the Lines	Themselves	Web series; 20 episodes
2009	I Heart Vampires	Vagablond	Episode: "Hunted, Part 3"

== Concert tours ==
Co-headlining

- The Tour of Gymnastics Superstars – (with Jordan Pruitt and Carly Patterson) (2008)

Opening act

- The Cheetah Girls – One World Tour (2008)
- Demi Lovato – Demi Lovato: Live in Concert (2009)
- Honor Society – Full Moon Crazy Tour (2009)
