= List of songs recorded by Aly & AJ =

The discography of Aly & AJ (briefly known as 78violet), an American pop rock duo, consists of four studio albums, one video album, two extended plays and compilation albums, 24 singles, 10 music videos and various album appearances. They released their debut studio album Into the Rush on August 17, 2005. The album debuted at number thirty six in the United States, selling over 24,000 copies in its first week and was later certified Gold by the RIAA. Into the Rush earned them the "Contemporary Inspirational Artists of the Year" nomination at the 2006 American Music Awards. Into the Rush has sold 839,000 copies in the United States and 1,000,000 worldwide.

In 2006, the duo released their second studio and first Holiday album, Acoustic Hearts of Winter, which peaked at seventy-eight on the Billboard 200 and sold 110,000 copies. Their third studio album, Insomniatic, debuted at number fifteen on the Billboard 200, selling over 39,000 copies in its first week, making it their highest debut to date. The album's lead single, "Potential Breakup Song", is their most successful single to date, it was certified Platinum and managed to peak at number seventeen on Billboard Hot 100, becoming their first top twenty and international hit.

In 2013, the duo released a single under the name '78violet' titled "Hothouse", which was their only single release under this name. In 2017, the duo returned with a new single titled "Take Me," which was released under their original name. They have since released various songs that have been compiled onto an album, We Don't Stop (2020), and released their fourth studio album in May 2021, their first album in 14 years.

== Released songs ==
Name of song, artist, writers, originating album, and year released.
Title	Artist(s)	Writer(s)	Album	Year	Ref.
"5 Damn Days"	78violet	Aly Michalka; AJ Michalka; Mike Einziger; David Kahne	Sanctuary, Vol. 1: 78violet (The Unreleased Album)	2020	
"8 Hours"	78violet	Aly Michalka; AJ Michalka; David Kahne; Guy Sigsworth	Sanctuary, Vol. 1: 78violet (The Unreleased Album)	2020	
"53rd Floor"	78violet	Aly Michalka; AJ Michalka; David Kahne; Guy Sigsworth	Sanctuary, Vol. 1: 78violet (The Unreleased Album)	2020	
"Attack of Panic"	Aly & AJ	Aly Michalka; AJ Michalka; CJ Baran; Ben Romans	Non-album single	2020	
"Belong Here"	78violet	Aly Michalka; AJ Michalka; Butch Walker	Hellcats (Music from the CW Television Series)	2010	
"Black Horse and the Cherry Tree" (Abbey Road Sessions)	Aly & AJ	KT Tunstall	Insomniatic (Japan Deluxe Edition)	2008	
"Blue My House Down"	78violet	Aly Michalka; AJ Michalka	Sanctuary, Vol. 1: 78violet (The Unreleased Album)	2020	
"Blush"	Aly & AJ	Aly Michalka; AJ Michalka	Insomniatic	2007	
"Boy"	78violet	Aly Michalka; AJ Michalka; Mike Einziger	Sanctuary, Vol. 1: 78violet (The Unreleased Album)	2020	
"Break Yourself"	Aly & AJ	Aly Michalka; AJ Michalka; Jamie Sierota; Yves Rothman	A Touch of the Beat Gets You Up on Your Feet Gets You Out and Then Into the Sun	2021	
"Bullseye"	Aly & AJ	Aly Michalka; AJ Michalka; Antonina Armato; Tim James	Insomniatic	2007	
"Careful with Words"	Aly & AJ	Aly Michalka; AJ Michalka	Insomniatic (Walmart Edition)	2007	
"Chemicals React"	Aly & AJ	Aly Michalka; AJ Michalka; Antonina Armato; Tim James	Into the Rush (Deluxe Edition)	2006	
"Church"	Aly & AJ	Aly Michalka; AJ Michalka; Yves Rothman; Mick Coogan; Josh Wei	Sanctuary	2019	
"Closure"	Aly & AJ	Aly Michalka; AJ Michalka; Antonina Armato; Tim James	Insomniatic	2007	
"Collapsed"	Aly & AJ	Aly Michalka	Into the Rush	2005	
"Collapsed"	Aly & AJ	Aly Michalka	Into the Rush (Deluxe Edition)	2006	
"Crawl"	78violet	Aly Michalka; AJ Michalka; Mike Einziger; David Kahne	Sanctuary, Vol. 1: 78violet (The Unreleased Album)	2020	
"Deck the Halls"	Aly & AJ	Traditional	Acoustic Hearts of Winter	2006	
"The Distance"	Aly & AJ	Aly Michalka; AJ Michalka; Jamie Sierota; Ryan Spraker	Ten Years	2017	
"÷ (Division)"	Aly & AJ	Aly Michalka; AJ Michalka; Antonina Armato; Tim James	Insomniatic	2007	
"Do You Believe in Magic"	Aly & AJ	John B. Sebastian	Into the Rush	2005	
"Don't Go Changing"	Aly & AJ	Aly Michalka; AJ Michalka; Ryan Spraker; Nick Dungo; Rainsford	Sanctuary	2019	
"Don't Need Nothing"	Aly & AJ	Aly Michalka; AJ Michalka; Jorge Elbrecht	A Touch of the Beat Gets You Up on Your Feet Gets You Out and Then Into the Sun	2021	
"Fifteen and a Half"	78violet	Aly Michalka; AJ Michalka; David Kahne	Sanctuary, Vol. 1: 78violet (The Unreleased Album)	2020	
"The First Noel"	Aly & AJ	Traditional	Acoustic Hearts of Winter	2006	
"Flattery"	Aly & AJ	Aly Michalka; AJ Michalka; Antonina Armato; Tim James	Insomniatic	2007	
"Freak"	78violet	Aly Michalka; AJ Michalka	Sanctuary, Vol. 1: 78violet (The Unreleased Album)	2020	
"God Rest Ye Merry Gentlemen"	Aly & AJ	Traditional	Acoustic Hearts of Winter	2006	
"Good Love"	Aly & AJ	Aly Michalka; AJ Michalka; Jamie Sierota; Ryan Spraker	Ten Years (Deluxe Edition)	2018	
"Greatest Time of Year"	Aly & AJ	Aly Michalka; AJ Michalka; Antonina Armato; Tim James	Acoustic Hearts of Winter	2006	
"Heart"	78violet	Aly Michalka; AJ Michalka	Sanctuary, Vol. 1: 78violet (The Unreleased Album)	2020	
"Hold Out"	Aly & AJ	Aly Michalka; AJ Michalka; Johnny Newman; Yves Rothman	A Touch of the Beat Gets You Up on Your Feet Gets You Out and Then Into the Sun	2021	
"Hole in the Earth"	78violet	Aly Michalka; AJ Michalka; Devin Bronson	Sanctuary, Vol. 1: 78violet (The Unreleased Album)	2020	
"Hothouse"	78violet	Aly Michalka; AJ Michalka; Mike Einziger	Sanctuary, Vol. 1: 78violet (The Unreleased Album)	2020	
"I Am One of Them"	Aly & AJ	Aly Michalka; AJ Michalka; Carrie Michalka	Into the Rush	2005	
"I Know"	Aly & AJ	Aly Michalka; AJ Michalka; Jamie Sierota; Ryan Spraker	Ten Years	2017	
"I'll Be Home for Christmas"	Aly & AJ	Kim Gannon; Walter Kent; Buck Ram	Acoustic Hearts of Winter	2006	
"I'm Here"	Aly & AJ	Aly Michalka; AJ Michalka	Insomniatic	2007	
"If I Could Have You Back"	Aly & AJ	Dan Wilson; Aly Michalka; AJ Michalka	Insomniatic	2007	
"In a Second"	Aly & AJ	Aly Michalka; AJ Michalka; Dan James; Leah Haywood	Into the Rush	2005	
"Insomniatic"	Aly & AJ	Aly Michalka; AJ Michalka	Insomniatic	2007	
"Jingle Bell Rock"	Aly & AJ	Joe Beal; Jim Boothe	Radio Disney Jingle Jams	2004	
"Joan of Arc on the Dance Floor"	Aly & AJ	Aly Michalka; AJ Michalka; Yves Rothman	Non-album single	2020	
"Joy to the World"	Aly & AJ	Isaac Watts; George Frideric Handel; Lowell Mason	Acoustic Hearts of Winter	2006	
"Let It Snow"	Aly & AJ	Jule Styne; Sammy Cahn	Acoustic Hearts of Winter	2006	
"Like It or Leave It"	Aly & AJ	Aly Michalka; AJ Michalka; Antonina Armato; Tim James	Insomniatic	2007	
"Like Whoa"	Aly & AJ	Aly Michalka; AJ Michalka; Antonina Armato; Tim James	Insomniatic	2007	
"Listen!!!"	Aly & AJ	Aly Michalka; AJ Michalka; Jorge Elbrecht	A Touch of the Beat Gets You Up on Your Feet Gets You Out and Then Into the Sun	2021	
"Little Drummer Boy"	Aly & AJ	Katherine Davis; Henry Onorati; Harry Simeone	Acoustic Hearts of Winter	2006	
"Little Notes"	78violet	Aly Michalka; AJ Michalka; Mike Einziger; David Kahne	Sanctuary, Vol. 1: 78violet (The Unreleased Album)	2020	
"Lost Cause"	Aly & AJ	Aly Michalka; AJ Michalka; Jamie Sierota; Yves Rothman	A Touch of the Beat Gets You Up on Your Feet Gets You Out and Then Into the Sun	2021	
"Lucky to Get Him"	Aly & AJ	Aly Michalka; AJ Michalka; Jorge Elbrech; Jeremiah Raisen; Yves Rothman	A Touch of the Beat Gets You Up on Your Feet Gets You Out and Then Into the Sun	2021	
"Never Far Behind"	Aly & AJ	Jeremy Bose; Paul Robert Evens; Matt Bronlewee	Into the Rush (Christian Edition)	2005	
"No One"	Aly & AJ	Aly Michalka; AJ Michalka; Carlos Tornes	Into the Rush	2005	
"Not Ready to Wake Up"	Aly & AJ	Aly Michalka; AJ Michalka; Yves Rotham; Jeremiah Raisen; Mick Coogan	Sanctuary	2019	
"Not This Year"	Aly & AJ	Aly Michalka; AJ Michalka; Antonina Armato; Tim James	Acoustic Hearts of Winter	2006	
"On the Ride"	Aly & AJ	Aly Michalka; AJ Michalka; Carrie Michalka; Adam Watts; Andy Dodd	Into the Rush	2005	
"Out of the Blue"	Aly & AJ	AJ Michalka; Carrie Michalka	Into the Rush	2005	
"Paradise"	Aly & AJ	Aly Michalka; AJ Michalka	A Touch of the Beat Gets You Up on Your Feet Gets You Out and Then Into the Sun	2021	
"Personal Cathedrals"	Aly & AJ	Aly Michalka; AJ Michalka; Johnny Newman; Stephen Ringer; Yves Rothman	A Touch of the Beat Gets You Up on Your Feet Gets You Out and Then Into the Sun	2021	
"Potential Breakup Song"	Aly & AJ	Aly Michalka; AJ Michalka; Antonina Armato; Tim James	Insomniatic	2007	
"Potential Breakup Song"	Aly & AJ	Aly Michalka; AJ Michalka; Antonina Armato; Tim James	Non-album single	2020	
"Pretty Places"	Aly & AJ	Aly Michalka; AJ Michalka; Jamie Sierota; Yves Rothman	A Touch of the Beat Gets You Up on Your Feet Gets You Out and Then Into the Sun	2021	
"Promises"	Aly & AJ	Aly Michalka; AJ Michalka; Jamie Sierota; Ryan Spraker	Ten Years	2017	
"Protecting Me"	Aly & AJ	AJ Michalka	Into the Rush	2005	
"Rockin' Around the Christmas Tree"	Aly & AJ	Johnny Marks	Acoustic Hearts of Winter (Target Edition)	2007	
"Rush"	Aly & AJ	Aly Michalka; AJ Michalka; Dan James; Leah Haywood	Into the Rush	2005	
"Sanctuary"	Aly & AJ	Aly Michalka; AJ Michalka; Ryan Spraker; Tom Peyton; Totem	Sanctuary	2019	
"Shine"	Aly & AJ	Aly Michalka; AJ Michalka; Antonina Armato; Tim James; Nick Scapa	Into the Rush (Deluxe Edition)	2006	
"Silence"	Aly & AJ	Aly Michalka; AJ Michalka; Carrie Michalka	Insomniatic	2007	
"Silent Night"	Aly & AJ	Joseph Mohr; Franz Gruber	Acoustic Hearts of Winter	2006	
"Slow Burn" (Live from Sun Studio)	Aly & AJ	Kacey Musgraves; Daniel Tashian; Ian Fitchuk	Non-album single	2019	
"Slow Dancing"	Aly & AJ	Aly Michalka; AJ Michalka; Jeremiah Raisen; Ryan Spraker; Yves Rothman	A Touch of the Beat Gets You Up on Your Feet Gets You Out and Then Into the Sun	2021	
"Slow Down"	Aly & AJ	Aly Michalka; AJ Michalka; Adam Watts; Andy Dodd	Into the Rush	2005	
"Something More"	Aly & AJ	Aly Michalka; AJ Michalka; Carrie Michalka	Into the Rush	2005	
"Something More"	Aly & AJ	Aly Michalka; AJ Michalka; Carrie Michalka	Into the Rush (Deluxe Edition)	2006	
"Speak for Myself"	Aly & AJ	Aly Michalka; AJ Michalka; Adam Watts; Andy Dodd	Into the Rush	2005	
"Star Maps"	Aly & AJ	Aly Michalka; AJ Michalka; Yves Rotham; Jeremiah Raisen	Sanctuary	2019	
"Sticks and Stones"	Aly & AJ	Aly Michalka; AJ Michalka; Carrie Michalka; Tim James; Antonina Armato	Into the Rush	2005	
"Stomach"	Aly & AJ	Aly Michalka; AJ Michalka; Olen Kittelson; Stephen Ringer; Yves Rothman; Jeremiah Raisen	A Touch of the Beat Gets You Up on Your Feet Gets You Out and Then Into the Sun	2021	
"Symptom of Your Touch"	Aly & AJ	Aly Michalka; AJ Michalka; Jorge Elbrech; Jeremiah Raisen; Yves Rothman	A Touch of the Beat Gets You Up on Your Feet Gets You Out and Then Into the Sun	2021	
"Take Me"	Aly & AJ	Aly Michalka; AJ Michalka; Jamie Sierota; Ryan Spraker	Ten Years	2017	
"Tears"	Aly & AJ	Aly Michalka; AJ Michalka; Carrie Michalka	Insomniatic (Target Edition)	2007	
"Today"	78violet	Aly Michalka; AJ Michalka; David Kahne	Sanctuary, Vol. 1: 78violet (The Unreleased Album)	2020	
"Walking on Sunshine"	Aly & AJ	Kimberley Rew	Into the Rush	2005	
"We Three Kings"	Aly & AJ	John Henry Hopkins Jr.	Acoustic Hearts of Winter	2006	
"We Wish You a Merry Christmas"	Aly & AJ	Traditional	Acoustic Hearts of Winter (Target Edition)	2007	
"We're an American Band"	Aly & AJ	Don Brewer	Randy Jackson's Music Club, Volume One (Walmart Edition)	2008	
"Winter Wonderland"	Aly & AJ	Richard B. Smith	Acoustic Hearts of Winter (Target Edition)	2007	
"With You"	Aly & AJ	Aly Michalka; AJ Michalka; Jamie Sierota; Ryan Spraker	Ten Years (Deluxe Edition)	2018	
"Zip-a-Dee-Doo-Dah"	Aly & AJ	Allie Wrubel; Ray Gilbert	Disneymania 3	2005	

== Unreleased songs ==
Title	Artist(s)	Writer(s)	Leaked	Intended album	Year	Ref.
"Attracted"	Aly & AJ	Aly Michalka; AJ Michalka	No	—	—	
"Blood Flow"	78violet	Aly Michalka; AJ Michalka	Yes	Hothouse	2013	
"Bullet"	78violet	Aly Michalka; AJ Michalka; Dan James; Leah Haywood	Yes	78violet	2010	
"Cold Hearted Girl"	Aly & AJ	Aly Michalka; AJ Michalka; Alex Pettyfer	No	—	—	
"Crumble"	78violet	Aly Michalka; AJ Michalka	Yes	Hothouse	2013	
"Cure to the Lonely"	78violet	Aly Michalka; AJ Michalka; Rivers Cuomo; Mike Elizondo	No	78violet	2010	
"Damaged"	78violet	Aly Michalka; AJ Michalka; Mary Miglino; Nancy Wilson	No	78violet	2010	
"The Edge"	78violet	Aly Michalka; AJ Michalka; Leah Haywood; Dan James	Yes	78violet	2010	
"Fading"	Aly & AJ	Aly Michalka; AJ Michalka; Raine Maida; Chantal Kreviazuk	Yes	—	c. 2010	
"Freak"	78violet	Aly Michalka; AJ Michalka	Yes	78violet	2010	
"The Good, the Bad, and the Boring"	78violet	Aly Michalka; AJ Michalka; Leah Haywood; Dan James	Yes	78violet	2010	
"Hazard"	78violet	Aly Michalka; AJ Michalka; Raine Maida; Chantal Kreviazuk	No	—	c. 2010	
"Hellcats"	78violet	Aly Michalka; AJ Michalka; Butch Walker	No	Hellcats	2010	
"Insane"	78violet	Aly Michalka; AJ Michalka; Mary Miglino; Nancy Wilson	Yes	78violet	2010	
"Lover of Kinds"	78violet	Aly Michalka; AJ Michalka; Devin Bronson	No	Hothouse	2013	
"Lovesick"	78violet	Unknown	Yes	78violet	2010	
"Magellan"	78violet	Aly Michalka; AJ Michalka; Carrie Michalka	Yes	78violet	2010	
"MIA"	78violet	Aly Michalka; AJ Michalka; Mike Elizondo	No	78violet	2010	
"Mr. Original"	78violet	Aly Michalka; AJ Michalka; Mike Elizondo	No	78violet	2010	
"The Next Worst Thing"	78violet	Aly Michalka; AJ Michalka; Rivers Cuomo; Mike Elizondo	Yes	78violet	2010	
"Now What"	78violet	Aly Michalka; AJ Michalka; Mary Miglino; Nancy Wilson	No	78violet	2010	
"Places"	78violet	Aly Michalka; AJ Michalka; Leah Haywood; Dan James	No	78violet	2010	
"Plutonium"	78violet	Aly Michalka; AJ Michalka; Toby Gad	Yes	—	2015	
"Practical"	Aly & AJ	Aly Michalka; AJ Michalka; Raine Maida; Chantal Kreviazuk	Yes	—	c. 2010	
"Say Hello"	78violet	Aly Michalka; AJ Michalka; Mike Elizondo	Yes	78violet	2010	
"Secret Door"	78violet	Aly Michalka; AJ Michalka; Nancy Wilson	Yes	Hothouse	2013	
"Shift"	Aly & AJ	Aly Michalka; AJ Michalka	No	—	—	
"Shut Up, I Love You"	78violet	Aly Michalka; AJ Michalka; Leah Haywood; Dan James	No	78violet	2010	
"Silly Boy"	78violet	Aly Michalka; AJ Michalka; Dan James; Leah Haywood	Yes	78violet	2010	
"Sucker for a Lover"	78violet	Aly Michalka; AJ Michalka; Dan James; Leah Haywood; John Nation	No	78violet	2010	
"Ten Years"	Aly & AJ	Aly Michalka; AJ Michalka; Jamie Sierota; Ryan Spraker	No	Ten Years	2017	
"There Will Be Blood"	78violet	Aly Michalka; AJ Michalka; Mike Elizondo	No	78violet	2010	
"Tracks"	78violet	Aly Michalka; AJ Michalka; Mike Elizondo	No	78violet	2010	
"Walk Alone Tonight"	78violet	Aly Michalka; AJ Michalka; Matt Squire	Yes	78violet	2010	
