= Chemicals React =

Single by Aly & AJ

from the album Into the Rush (Deluxe Edition)
- Released: June 27, 2006
- Recorded: 2006
- Genre: Pop punk; power pop; alternative rock
- Length: 2:55
- Label: Hollywood
- Songwriters: Aly Michalka; AJ Michalka; Antonina Armato; Tim James
- Producer: Rock Mafia

Aly & AJ singles chronology
"On the Ride" (2006)	"Chemicals React" (2006)	"Greatest Time of Year" (2006)

"Chemicals React" is a song written and recorded by American pop rock duo Aly & AJ, for the deluxe edition reissue of their debut album Into the Rush (2005). The Michalka sisters co-wrote the song with Antonina Armato and Tim James of production duo Rock Mafia, who also produced the track. It was the second mainstream single from Into the Rush and seventh overall single, released to radio by Hollywood Records on June 27, 2006. "Chemicals React" served as the group's debut international release. A re-recorded version of the song was released on July 22, 2022.

== Release and promotion ==
The song was recorded in 2006 for the reissue of the duo's debut album, Into the Rush, which was released in August 2006. "Chemicals React" was released June 15, 2006 as the fourth overall single from the album and first from the Deluxe Edition. Hollywood Records serviced the song to contemporary hit radio in the United States on June 27, 2006. It follows "Rush" as the album's second mainstream single. An extended play containing five tracks and three music videos was released in the United States on in September 2006. The song was released digitally in Europe in May 2007, their first international release.

Aly & AJ recorded a version in Simlish for The Sims 2: Pets, an expansion pack to the popular The Sims game franchise. The Simlish version was released for digital download in the iTunes store on October 31, 2006. A remix of the song was later included on their third studio album Insomniatic (2007).

Following the re-recording of "Like Whoa (A&A Version)" in May 2022, the duo released a re-recording of "Chemicals React" on July 22, 2022, also subtitled "A&A Version".

== Commercial performance ==
"Chemicals React" failed to chart on its first release in June 2006, but after its re-release in September 2006, the song entered the Billboard Hot 100 at number 70. It reached a peak position of 50 on the chart dated October 10, 2006. "Chemicals React" also charted at number 36 on the magazine's Pop 100 chart, which combines mainstream radio airplay and sales, but failed to enter the Mainstream Top 40 component chart. As of June 2007, the song had sold 175,000 downloads in the United States.

== Music video ==
The music video was directed by Chris Applebaum and features Aly & AJ lip synching the song live. It premiered June 29, 2006 on MTV. As of May 2017, the video on Hollywood Records's YouTube account has accumulated over 12,000,000 views. The video for "Chemicals React" is included on the duo's video album, Fav Five - Let Me Repeat That (2007).

A video was also produced for the Simlish version of the song, set in the Sims world and featuring the sisters as Sims characters alongside virtual replicas of their dogs, Saint and Bandit. This video is included on the Chemicals React EP and on the Deluxe Edition of Into the Rush.

== Track listings and formats ==
Digital download/Promo CD
No.	Title	Writer(s)	Length
1.	"Chemicals React"	Aly Michalka; AJ Michalka; Antonina Armato; Tim James	2:55

Chemicals React (Simlish Version)
No.	Title	Writer(s)	Length
1.	"Chemicals React (Simlish Version)"	Aly Michalka; AJ Michalka; Armato; James	2:54

Digital EP
No.	Title	Writer(s)	Length
1.	"Chemicals React"	Aly Michalka; AJ Michalka; Armato; James	2:58
2.	"Shine"	Aly Michalka; AJ Michalka; Armato; James; Nick Scapa	3:24
3.	"Never Far Behind"	Jeremy Bose; Paul Robert Evens; Matt Bronleewe	3:20
4.	"Something More" (new version)	Aly Michalka; AJ Michalka; Carrie Michalka	3:36
5.	"Collapsed" (new version)	Aly Michalka	2:54
Total length:			18:12

== Charts ==
Chart (2006)	Peak position
US Billboard Hot 100	50
US Billboard Pop 100	36

== Release history ==
Country	Date	Format	Version	Label	Ref.
United States	June 15, 2006	Digital download	Original	Hollywood	
United States	June 27, 2006	Contemporary hit radio	Original	Hollywood	
United States	September 19, 2006	Digital extended play	Original	Hollywood	
United States	October 31, 2006	Digital download	Simlish	Hollywood	
France	May 13, 2007	Digital download	Original	EMI	
Germany	May 13, 2007	Digital download	Original	EMI	
United Kingdom	May 13, 2007	Digital download	Original	EMI	
Russia	July 11, 2007	Contemporary hit radio	Original	Gala	
Various	July 22, 2022	Digital download; Streaming	A&A Version	Aly & AJ	
