= Into the Rush =

Studio album by Aly & AJ
- Released: August 16, 2005
- Recorded: 2004–2005
- Genres: Pop rock; alternative rock
- Length: 45:56
- Label: Hollywood
- Producers: Antonina Armato; Andy Dodd; Matthew Gerrard; Leah Haywood; Daniel James; Tim James; Adam Watts

Aly & AJ chronology
Into the Rush (2005)	Acoustic Hearts of Winter (2006)

Singles from Into the Rush
- 1. "Do You Believe in Magic" Released: February 15, 2005; 2. "No One" Released: March 18, 2005; 3. "Walking on Sunshine" Released: June 22, 2005; 4. "Never Far Behind" Released: October 10, 2005; 5. "Rush" Released: February 28, 2006; 6. "On the Ride" Released: March 7, 2006

Into the Rush is the debut studio album by American pop rock duo Aly & AJ, released by Disney-owned label Hollywood Records on August 16, 2005. The album features 14 tracks, including the singles "Rush" and "Do You Believe in Magic". A deluxe edition of the album was released in 2006 three all new songs, two new mixes of previous songs, and a bonus DVD. A vinyl reissue of the album was released in 2021.

The album generally received positive reviews from critics and became a commercial success. Into the Rush had sold over 839,000 copies and as of March 2025, it has been certified Platinum. The album sold 1,000,000 copies worldwide. The album, combined with the sales of the Deluxe Edition, became one of the top best-selling albums in the United States in 2006; Into the Rush ranked at number 112 on the Billboard 200 Albums end-of-year charts of 2006.

== Chart performance ==
Into the Rush debuted at number 36, selling 25,000 copies in its first week. The album spent 40 weeks on the Billboard 200. The album's last position was 123 before falling off the next week. The album was selling more than 25,000 copies a week for nearly 30 weeks. The album sold 839,000 copies in the United States and 1,000,000 worldwide.

== Singles ==
"Do You Believe in Magic" is a cover of The Lovin' Spoonful's 1965 debut single. It was featured in the 2007 film The Game Plan, the 2009 Wizards of Waverly Place soundtrack, and received airplay on Radio Disney. The single peaked at number two on the Billboard Hot Singles Sales chart. A music video for the song was released in February 2005 and received heavy rotation on Disney Channel.

"No One" was released as a single on March 18, 2005, and received airplay on Radio Disney. The song was featured in the 2005 Walt Disney Pictures film Ice Princess as well as on its accompanying soundtrack. A music video was released in March 2005 featuring scenes from Ice Princess, along with shots of the duo performing the song.

"Walking on Sunshine", a cover of the Katrina and the Waves song, was released as a single on June 22, 2005, and received airplay on Radio Disney. The song was featured in the 2005 Walt Disney Pictures film Herbie: Fully Loaded, as well as on its accompanying soundtrack. A music video for the song was released in June 2005 showing the duo arriving at a set and performing the song in front of the shooting crew.

Following the album's release on August 16, 2005, "Never Far Behind" was released as a single on October 10. It was released to Christian Adult Contemporary and Christian Contemporary Hit Radio formats, making it the duo's first single to be released outside of Radio Disney. It peaked at number 28 on the Billboard Hot Christian Songs chart. The song was originally written and recorded for a companion album to the film The Chronicles of Narnia: The Lion, The Witch and The Wardrobe, but the album was scrapped. The song was added to the edition of the album sent to Christian music retailers and was later included on the Deluxe Edition of the album in 2006.

On February 28, 2006, the single "Rush" was released. The song's accompanying music video was directed by Marc Webb and was released on February 15, 2006. The song was their first to chart on the Billboard Hot 100, peaking at number 59.

"On the Ride" was released as a single on March 7, 2006. It was featured in the Disney Channel Original Movie Cow Belles, starring Aly & AJ. Its music video incorporates scenes from the film.

"Chemicals React" was released as a single on June 27, 2006, to promote the deluxe edition of the album. Its music video was directed by Chris Applebaum and features Aly & AJ performing the song on a set-up stage. The song peaked at number 50 on the Billboard Hot 100.

== Deluxe Edition ==
Into the Rush: Deluxe Edition was released on August 8, 2006. It contains a re-ordered track listing, new versions of the songs "Something More" and "Collapsed," three extra songs, "Chemicals React," "Shine," and "Never Far Behind," and a bonus DVD with three music videos. "Chemicals React" would later be included on Aly & AJ's third studio album, Insomniatic, as "Chemicals React (Remix)" in 2007.

== Critical reception ==
Professional ratings
Review scores
Source	Rating
About.com	4/5 stars
Allmusic	2.5/5 stars
Christianity Today	2.5/5 stars
Common Sense Media	4/5 stars
Cross Rhythms	8/10 stars
Jesus Freak Hideout	3/5 stars
Kidz World	3/5 stars

The album received mixed to positive reviews from critics. Fran Grauman from about.com gave the album a 4 star rating, praising Aly and AJ's "ton of talent" and "experience." AllMusic gave the album a mixed review, saying it "doesn't venture further than offering a few empowering ballads", to hand them 2.5 stars after. AMG does praise them for having a real singing ability, citing "Aly & AJ can actually sing — their vocals have more way personality than prefab Disney hopefuls like Hayden Panettiere or Caleigh Peters — and the arrangements are slick without resorting to flashily empty pap". The review finishes with "Into the Rush is listenable, likeable, and more about being memorable than being Disney product."

== Track listing ==
Into the Rush – Standard edition (2061-62505-2)
No.	Title	Writer(s)	Producer(s)	Length
1.	"Rush"	Aly Michalka; AJ Michalka; Dan James; Leah Haywood	D. James; Haywood	3:11
2.	"No One"	Aly Michalka; AJ Michalka; Carlos Tornes	D. James; Haywood; Jon Lind^{[a]}	2:58
3.	"Collapsed"	Aly Michalka	D. James; Haywood	2:53
4.	"Something More"	Aly Michalka; AJ Michalka; Carrie Michalka	D. James; Haywood; Antonina Armato^{[a]}; Tim James^{[a]}	3:36
5.	"On the Ride"	Aly Michalka; AJ Michalka; C. Michalka; Adam Watts; Andy Dodd	Watts; Dodd	3:31
6.	"Speak for Myself"	Aly Michalka; AJ Michalka; Watts; Dodd	Watts; Dodd; Lind^{[a]}	3:10
7.	"Out of the Blue"	AJ Michalka; C. Michalka	D. James; Haywood	2:58
8.	"In a Second"	Aly Michalka; AJ Michalka; D. James; Haywood	D. James; Haywood	3:35
9.	"I Am One of Them"	Aly Michalka; AJ Michalka; C. Michalka	D. James; Haywood	3:25
10.	"Sticks and Stones"	Aly Michalka; AJ Michalka; C. Michalka; T. James; Armato	Armato; T. James	3:37
11.	"Protecting Me"	AJ Michalka, Aly Michalka	D. James; Haywood	2:59
12.	"Slow Down"	Aly Michalka; AJ Michalka; Watts; Dodd	Armato; T. James	3:55
13.	"Do You Believe in Magic"	John Sebastian	Matthew Gerrard	2:14
14.	"Walking on Sunshine"	Kimberley Rew	Gerrard	3:54
Total length:				45:56

Into the Rush – Christian edition bonus track (2061-62560-2)
No.	Title	Writer(s)	Producer(s)	Length
15.	"Never Far Behind"	Jeremy Bose; Paul Robert Evens; Matt Bronleewe	Armato; T. James	3:19
Total length:				49:15

Into the Rush – Japanese edition bonus tracks (AVCW-130560)
No.	Title	Writer(s)	Producer(s)	Length
15.	"Never Far Behind"	Jeremy Bose; Paul Robert Evens; Matt Bronleewe	Armato; T. James	3:19
16.	"Rush" (live show mix)			4:19
17.	"No One" (live show mix)			3:50
Total length:				57:24

Into the Rush – Deluxe Edition (2061-62640-2)
No.	Title	Writer(s)	Producer(s)	Length
1.	"Chemicals React"	Aly Michalka; AJ Michalka; Antonina Armato; Tim James	Armato; T. James	2:55
2.	"Shine"	Aly Michalka; AJ Michalka; Armato; T. James; Nick Scapa	Armato; T. James	3:24
3.	"Never Far Behind"	Jeremy Bose; Paul Robert Evens; Matt Bronleewe	Armato; T. James	3:20
4.	"Something More" (new version)	Aly Michalka; AJ Michalka; Carrie Michalka	Armato; T. James	3:36
5.	"Collapsed" (new version)	Aly Michalka	Armato; T. James; Dan James^{[a]}; Leah Haywood^{[a]}	2:53
6.	"Rush"	Aly Michalka; AJ Michalka; D. James; Haywood	D. James; Haywood	3:11
7.	"No One"	Aly Michalka; AJ Michalka; Carlos Tornes	D. James; Haywood; Jon Lind^{[a]}	2:57
8.	"On the Ride"	Aly Michalka; AJ Michalka; C. Michalka; Adam Watts; Andy Dodd	Watts; Dodd	3:31
9.	"In a Second"	Aly Michalka; AJ Michalka; D. James; Haywood	D. James; Haywood	3:35
10.	"Speak for Myself"	Aly Michalka; AJ Michalka; Watts; Dodd	Watts; Dodd; Lind^{[a]}	3:10
11.	"Out of the Blue"	AJ Michalka; C. Michalka	D. James; Haywood	2:58
12.	"I Am One of Them"	Aly Michalka; AJ Michalka; C. Michalka	D. James; Haywood	3:25
13.	"Sticks and Stones"	Aly Michalka; AJ Michalka; C. Michalka; T. James; Armato	Armato; T. James	3:47
14.	"Protecting Me"	AJ Michalka	D. James; Haywood	2:58
15.	"Slow Down"	Aly Michalka; AJ Michalka; Watts; Dodd	Armato; T. James	3:54
16.	"Do You Believe in Magic"	John Sebastian	Matthew Gerrard	2:13
17.	"Walking on Sunshine"	Kimberley Rew	Gerrard	3:53
Total length:				55:50

Into the Rush – Deluxe Edition DVD (2061-62640-20)
No.	Title	Director	Length
1.	"Chemicals React" (music video)	Chris Applebaum	2:55
2.	"Chemicals React" (music video; Simlish version)		3:25
3.	"Rush" (music video)	Marc Webb	3:19
Total length:			9:39

Into the Rush – Target Exclusive Deluxe Edition DVD (2061-62657-2)
No.	Title	Length
4.	"On the Ride"	1:31
Total length:		11:10

=== Notes ===
- ^{^[a]} signifies an additional producer

== Personnel ==
Credits adapted from the deluxe edition's liner notes

- Aly Michalka – vocals
- AJ Michalka – vocals
- Jamie Muhoberac – keyboards (2, 4, 5)
- Adam Watts – keyboards (8, 10), acoustic guitars (10), drums (10)
- Tim Pierce – guitars (1–7, 9–15)
- Andy Dodd – electric guitars (8, 10), keyboards (10)
- Sean Hurley – bass (1–7, 9, 11, 12, 14, 15)
- David J. Carpenter – bass (8)
- Chevy Martinez – bass (13)
- Dorian Crozier – drums (1–5, 13, 15)
- Nigel Lundemo – drum programming (2, 4)
- John Robinson – drums (6, 7, 9, 11, 12, 14)
- Scott Warren – string arrangements (2)

=== Production ===
- Jon Lind – executive producer, A&R, additional production (7, 10)
- Tim James – producer (1–5, 13, 15)
- Antonina Armato – producer (1–5, 13, 15)
- Dan James – producer (6, 7, 9, 11, 12, 14), additional production (5)
- Leah Haywood – producer (6, 7, 9, 11, 12, 14), additional production (5)
- Adam Watts – producer (8, 10)
- Andy Dodd – producer (8, 10)
- Matthew Gerrard – producer (16, 17)
- Dave Snow – creative director
- Linda Cobb – design
- Keith Munyon – cover photography
- Melanie Nissen – photography

Deluxe Edition

- Mike Lohr – design
- Omar Ganai – cover photography
- Amy V. Cooper – photography

Technical

- Robert Vosgien – mastering at Capitol Mastering (Hollywood, California) (1)
- Stephen Marcussen – mastering at Marcussen Mastering (Hollywood, California) (2–17)
- Ross Hogarth – engineer (1, 2, 5)
- Nigel Lundemo – engineer (1–5)
- Tim James – mixing (1–5, 13, 15)
- Paul Palmer – mixing (1–5)
- Freddie Sipowicz – engineer (6, 7, 9–12, 14)
- Jon Lind – mixing (6, 7, 9–12, 14)
- Brian Reeves – mixing (6, 7, 9–12, 14)
- Andy Dodd – mixing (8)
- Adam Watts – mixing (8)
- Antonina Armato – mixing (13, 15)
- Krish Sharma – mixing (16, 17)
- Dave Mortensen – second engineer (6, 7, 9–12, 14)
- Arthur Suslo – second engineer (6, 7, 9–12, 14)

== Charts ==
=== Weekly charts ===
Chart (2005)	Peak position
Japanese Albums (Oricon)	94
US Billboard 200	36

=== Year-end charts ===
Chart (2006)	Peak position
US Billboard 200	112

== Sales and certifications ==
Region	Certification	Certified units/sales
United States (RIAA)	Gold	839,000

== Release history ==
Country	Date	Label	Edition
Canada	August 16, 2005	Hollywood	Standard
United States	August 16, 2005	Hollywood	Standard
Japan	February 8, 2006	Avex Trax	Standard
Canada	August 8, 2006	Hollywood	Deluxe
United States	August 8, 2006	Hollywood	Deluxe
United States	May 21, 2021	Hollywood	LP standard
