= Sister Act (disambiguation) =

Sister Act may refer to:

- Sister Act, a 1992 film directed by Emile Ardolino and starring Whoopi Goldberg
  - Sister Act 2: Back in the Habit, a 1993 sequel film of Sister Act, directed by Bill Duke and starring Whoopi Goldberg
  - Sister Act (musical), a musical adaptation of the film
- "Sister Act", an episode of That's So Raven
- "The Sister Act", an episode of The O.C.
- "Sister Act", a season 4 episode of The Loud House

== See also ==
- Aly & AJ: Sister Act, a reality show
- "Doug's Sister Act", an episode of Doug
