= On the Ride =

Single by Aly & AJ

from the album Into the Rush
- Released: March 7, 2006
- Recorded: 2005
- Genre: Pop rock
- Length: 3:31
- Label: Hollywood
- Songwriter(s): Alyson Michalka, Amanda Michalka, C. Michalka, Adam Watts, Andy Dodd
- Producer(s): Adam Watts, Andy Dodd

Aly & AJ minor singles chronology
"Rush" (2005)	"On the Ride" (2006)	"Chemicals React" (2006)

"On the Ride" is a song recorded by American pop rock duo Aly & AJ, released as the sixth single from their debut album Into the Rush. It was also released with their 2006 Disney Channel Original Movie Cow Belles, in which the girls play the starring roles. Its music video features scenes from the movie merged in it and this song is featured in the movie. Their first live concert DVD On the Ride is named after this song.

== Track listing ==
Digital download/Promo CD (U.S., March 7, 2006)
No.	Title	Length
1.	"On the Ride"	3:31
