= Rush (Aly & AJ song) =

Single by Aly & AJ

from the album Into the Rush
- B-side: "Never Far Behind"
- Released: February 28, 2006
- Recorded: 2005
- Genre: Pop rock; alternative rock; post-grunge
- Length: 3:11
- Label: Hollywood
- Songwriters: Aly Michalka; AJ Michalka; Dan James; Leah Haywood
- Producers: Dan James; Leah Haywood

Aly & AJ singles chronology
"Never Far Behind" (2005)	"Rush" (2006)	"On the Ride" (2006)

"Rush" is a pop rock song recorded by American pop rock duo Aly & AJ for their debut album Into the Rush. The track was released as their first official single nationwide by their label Hollywood Records, and as the album's fifth single overall. It was first released to Radio Disney on October 14, 2005 to promote the Disney Channel Original Movie Twitches, but later grew to become extremely popular, which led to a mainstream release on February 28, 2006. It was later released for digital download on July 11, 2006 and on November 25, 2006 in Australia.

== Song information ==
"Rush" is a moderate pop rock song in a key of D minor. The song is also featured on the soundtrack to the Bratz: Rock Angelz video game (as "Into the Rush") and in the Disney Channel Original Movie Twitches.

== Track listings ==
Digital download and promo CD
No.	Title	Writer(s)	Length
1.	"Rush"	Aly Michalka; AJ Michalka; Dan James; Leah Haywood	3:11

Digital download two
No.	Title	Writer(s)	Length
1.	"Rush"	Aly Michalka; AJ Michalka; Dan James; Leah Haywood	3:17
2.	"Radio Disney Exclusive Interview"		2:03
Total length:			5:20

Digital EP
No.	Title	Length
1.	"Rush"	3:11
2.	"Never Far Behind"	3:21
3.	"On the Ride"	3:31
Total length:		10:04

== Music video ==
There are two versions of the video. The first version, released by Disney only, featured Aly & AJ performing the song live in concert and scenes from Twitches.
The second version was directed by Marc Webb and shot in Hawaii, premiering on February 15, 2006. It portrays the sisters traveling to five locations: a beach, a campsite, a jungle, a bazaar and a music store. One of the locations that was filmed is known as Jackass Gingers which is a popular local swimming spot on the island of Oahu.

== Chart and certifications ==
"Rush" is Aly & AJ's first single that was a commercial success in the United States. When it was initially released, it was able to chart on Billboard's Pop 100 and Hot Digital Songs. The following February, when it was re-released, it managed to make it on the Billboard Hot 100, peaking at number 59 and staying on the chart for a total of 11 weeks. To date the single has reached over 900,000 digital downloads. The music video for the song debuted at number two on MTV's Total Request Live, remaining on it for eight non-consecutive weeks.

=== Charts ===
Chart (2006)	Peak position
U.S. Billboard Hot 100	59
U.S. Billboard Pop 100	44

== Certifications ==
Region	Certification	Certified units/sales
United States (RIAA)	Gold	500,000^{‡}
^{‡} Sales+streaming figures based on certification alone.

== Release history ==
Date	Country	Format	Label
October 14, 2005	United States	Digital download + Radio Disney	Hollywood
February 28, 2006	United States	Mainstream radio	Hollywood
July 11, 2006	United States	Digital download^{1}	Hollywood
November 25, 2006	Australia	Digital single + EP	Hollywood

- ^{1}: Digital release with "Radio Disney Exclusive Interview" as second track.
