= Weepah Way for Now =

2015 film by Stephen Ringer

- Theatrical release poster
- Directed by: Stephen Ringer
- Written by: Stephen Ringer
- Produced by: Kerry Barden; Aly Michalka; AJ Michalka; Stephen Ringer
- Starring: Aly Michalka; AJ Michalka
- Cinematography: Stephen Ringer
- Edited by: Stephen Ringer
- Music by: Mike Einziger; Ann Marie Calhoun
- Production companies: Violet House; Thick Water Entertainment
- Distributed by: Gravitas Ventures
- Release date: June 16, 2015 (Los Angeles Film Festival)
- Running time: 89 minutes
- Country: United States
- Language: English

Weepah Way for Now is a 2015 American comedy-drama film written and directed by Stephen Ringer and starring Aly and AJ Michalka.

== Plot ==
Elle and Joy are two sisters apart by two years. The two are singers and are living together away from the city and making do with the new life they have chosen.

== Cast ==
- Aly Michalka as Elle, the elder sister
- AJ Michalka as Joy, the younger sister
- Mimi Rogers as Lynn, Elle and Joy’s mother
- Amanda Crew as Alice, Elle and Joy’s friend
- Saoirse Ronan as Emily (voice), Elle and Joy’s deceased sister
- Liam Aiken as Reed, Elle’s love interest
- Gil Bellows as John, Elle and Joy’s father
- Dan Byrd as Dan, Elle and Joy’s closest friend
- Madeline Zima as Lauren, a friend of Elle and Joy
- Erin Cummings as Susan, John’s girlfriend
- Ryan Donowho as Syd, Joy’s love interest
- Gale Harold as Theatrical Agent
- Jon Heder as Ernie
- Tyler Labine as Record Executive

== Release ==
The film made its worldwide premiere on June 16, 2015 at the Los Angeles Film Festival.

== Reception ==
On the review aggregator website Rotten Tomatoes, 80% of 5 critics' reviews are positive.
