= Sequoia (2014 film) =

2014 American comedy film

- Theatrical release poster
- Directed by: Andy Landen
- Written by: Andrew Rothschild
- Produced by: Giles Andrew; Ashleigh Phillips; Jessica Latham
- Starring: Aly Michalka; Dustin Milligan; Joey Lauren Adams; Lou Diamond Phillips; Corbin Frost; Sophi Bairley
- Cinematography: Stephen Ringer
- Edited by: Franklin Peterson
- Music by: Mark Noseworthy
- Production companies: Honora; The Film Board
- Distributed by: The Orchard
- Release dates: March 9, 2014 (SXSW); August 25, 2015 (United States)
- Running time: 86 minutes
- Country: United States
- Language: English

Sequoia is a 2014 American comedy film directed by Andy Landen, written by Andrew Rothschild, and starring Aly Michalka, Dustin Milligan, Joey Lauren Adams, Lou Diamond Phillips, Corbin Frost and Sophi Bairley. It was released on August 25, 2015, by The Orchard.

== Plot ==
Riley (Aly Michalka) films her visit with her doctor (Sean Hood) so her absent mother will know Riley has stage 3 oral cancer with a 10% chance of survival.

Riley meets Ogden (Dustin Milligan) on a bus and they both get off near Sequoia National Park. Since her connecting bus won’t arrive for a few hours, he offers to drop her off. Before she exits his car, she kisses him. Ogden wants to see her in the morning but Riley declines since she plans to meet her sister the next day. She goes to her hotel room alone, where she takes a lethal dose of drugs which she also films.

Earlier the same day, Riley’s sister, Van (Sophi Bairley), attempts to sneak out to meet Riley, but she totals the car. Van reluctantly tells their father, Oscar (Todd Lowe), that Riley is in Sequoia with lethal drugs.

Furious, Oscar phones his ex-wife and Riley’s mother, Bev (Joey Lauren Adams), who shows no sympathy towards Riley’s latest “staged drama”. Bev’s new partner, Steve (Demetri Martin), is equally unsympathetic. Steve and Bev, motivated to finalize Oscar and Bev’s divorce papers, agree to drive Oscar and Van to Riley’s location – just after Steve drives them all to his interview first.

Back at the hotel, Riley listens to Van’s voicemail and is upset to learn that Van won't be joining her on her last day.

In the morning, Ogden finds Riley at the hotel’s pool where she shows him the effects of her oral cancer. He stays with her and also obliges to take her to the peak, the ironically named Hanging Rock.

It is not until Riley and Ogden reach a blocked road that she reveals to him that she’s taken lethal drugs and is running out of time. This frustrates them both. She steals his car and drives away leaving him behind, but Ogden, having memorized her phone number from earlier, calls and promises that he’ll stay with her until the end wherever she wants to go. Reunited, Riley teaches Ogden how to film her last moments but in doing so, they also film each other exploring and enjoying the park. During a brief rainstorm, they retreat to the car and Ogden plays the mandolin and sings an original song to her.

Afterwards, Ogden films Riley from afar as she approaches the Sherman Tree (General Sherman Tree), a tree believed to have healing powers. There, she meets Colin (Lou Diamond Phillips), a man with AIDS who prays to the tree, by telling it his disease, why he wants to live, for how many years, and what he promises to do if he gets his wish. Riley doesn't ask for a specific number of years but she does ask to live to help Ogden’s songwriting. Riley then collapses, but Ogden manages to drive her to the peak for her final moments. When Riley’s family arrives, they see Riley peacefully lying on Ogden’s lap.

Riley’s parents watch her videos in a hospital waiting room. Riley wakes up and Van asks her to stick around until Van is at least 18. The film ends with all of Riley’s family bickering, but reunited. While her family bickers, Riley receives a call from Ogden who sings her new lyrics to his song from earlier.

== Cast ==
- Aly Michalka as Riley
- Dustin Milligan as Ogden
- Joey Lauren Adams as Bev
- Lou Diamond Phillips as Colin
- Corbin Frost as Historian
- Sophi Bairley as Van
- Sean Hood as Dr. Morton
- Todd Lowe as Oscar MacGrady
- Demetri Martin as Steve

== Release ==
The film premiered at South by Southwest on March 9, 2014. The film was released on August 25, 2015, by The Orchard.
