= Grace Unplugged =

- Theatrical release poster
- Directed by: Brad J. Silverman
- Screenplay by: Brad J. Silverman; Brandon Rice
- Produced by: Russ Rice; Larry Frenzel
- Starring: AJ Michalka; James Denton; Kevin Pollak; Michael Welch; Shawnee Smith
- Cinematography: Stash Slionski
- Edited by: Robert Hoffman
- Music by: Jeff Lippencott
- Production company: Orion Pictures
- Distributed by: Lionsgate; Roadside Attractions
- Release date: October 4, 2013 (United States)
- Running time: 102 minutes
- Country: United States
- Language: English
- Budget: $1.7 million
- Box office: $2.5 million

Grace Unplugged is a 2013 Christian drama film. The film is based on the parable of The Prodigal Son and a story by Brandon Rice, written and directed by Brad J. Silverman, and stars AJ Michalka, Jamie Grace, Shawnee Smith, James Denton, and Kevin Pollak. The film follows an 18-year-old woman who rejects her father's desire for her to be a church singer and goes to Hollywood seeking stardom.

The film was released to theaters in the United States on October 4, 2013, by Lionsgate and Roadside Attractions.

It was co-produced by Orion Pictures in their first film during its relaunch by MGM under the banner since One Man's Hero in 1999.

== Plot ==
Grace Trey is an 18-year-old Christian teenager with religious parents who take her to youth group and church every Sunday. Grace's father, Johnny, does not let her play and sing her own way when she is anywhere. Johnny is strict about his religion and only wants Grace to sing religious songs, but Grace thinks otherwise. During church one day, Grace decides to add her own touch to a song. This begins a disagreement between Grace, who wants to focus on being a singer and songwriter, and her parents, who want Grace to go to college and get an education. Grace decides to leave home to follow her dream. This upsets Johnny, who is afraid that Grace will get hurt. Grace's mother, Michelle, convinces Johnny to let Grace find out on her own, which Johnny reluctantly agrees to.

Grace meets up with Johnny's ex-producer, and her star soon begins to rise, with her first concert being a success. After meeting her favorite female singer, Renae Taylor, Grace gets asked out by a movie star and overhears his conversation on the phone. Grace struggles to comprehend what he says on it, holding in the information from her favorite singer and the movie star. People want to hear Grace's next song, which she struggles with writing, and after overhearing her stylist's conversation in the bathroom, she breaks down in her apartment. Quentin, an intern, comes to Grace's door and offers her dinner at his house with his family.

After a conversation with Quentin on the beach, Grace leaves a note for her producer, saying that she is going to leave. She goes home to her family and her church, who starts crying and welcome her with open arms. Two years later, Grace is 20 years old and is invited to sing at a concert hosted by Chris Tomlin. She is now engaged to be married to Quentin, and the film ends with her singing with Johnny at a Chris Tomlin concert.

== Cast ==
- AJ Michalka as Grace "Gracie" Rose Trey
  - Madison Wolfe as Young Grace
- James Denton as Johnny Trey
- Kevin Pollak as Frank "Mossy" Mostin
- Shawnee Smith as Michelle Trey
- Michael Welch as Quentin
- Jamie Grace as Rachel
- Emma Catherwood as Kendra Burroughs
- Chris Ellis as Pastor Tim Bryant
- Kelly Thiebaud as Renae Taylor
- Pia Toscano as Alyssa
- Zane Holtz as Jay Grayson
- Chris Tomlin as himself

== Production ==
The film was mainly shot in Birmingham, Alabama. Scenes were shot at the Alabama Theatre. Filming also took place in Los Angeles, California and wrapped on September 15, 2012. The production budget was of less than $3 million.

The movie is based on the parable of The Prodigal Son and in part on the real-life experience of producer Russ Rice, whose daughter ran away from home after rejecting the Christian faith in which she was raised."

In an interview before the film's release, Michalka described the title character's journey as learning that family and God are more important than stardom. "The main theme of the film is to surround yourself with people who truly have your best interest at heart," she said. "I think you can get caught up in whatever you do, it doesn’t have to be the entertainment industry, it can be the workforce or whatever. You can surround yourself with people who are not necessarily looking out for you from a godly perspective, but want you to make money, or are using you for a certain thing, or have a certain motive that isn’t pure. It's really about surrounding yourself with fellow Christians and putting God first–I think that is the biggest part of this story."

Michalka also told Billboard magazine, "I love the film. I love how it turned out. It's really heartwarming and sweet."

== Music ==
Michalka's single from the film, "All I've Ever Needed," was released June 25, 2013. Michalka described the song as one that "explores the moments we have in life when we realize the things we've been chasing mean nothing if you walk away from your faith. I hope people connect with the song the way I have," Michalka added, "and realize that despite what we think we need and want - what we really need is God's love. And we've had that all along." "All I've Ever Needed" was written by Sarah Hart and Ben Glover.

Capitol Christian Music released the soundtrack to the film August 27. It features songs by Michalka, as well as Christian artists TobyMac, Chris Tomlin and Luminate, as well as former American Idol contestant Colton Dixon.

Track listing

1. "All I've Ever Needed" - AJ Michalka
2. "Desert Song" - AJ Michalka
3. "You Never Let Go" featuring James Denton - AJ Michalka
4. "Misunderstood" - AJ Michalka
5. "Holding On" - Jamie Grace
6. "Our God" - Chris Tomlin
7. "Steal My Show" - TobyMac
8. "In and Out of Time" - Colton Dixon
9. "The Void" - Nine Lashes
10. "The Space Between Us" - Shawn McDonald
11. "Welcome to Daylight" - Luminate
12. "Amazing Grace" - Josh Wilson

== Release ==
Lionsgate and Roadside showed the film to Christian groups over seven months as part of a wide outreach effort leading up to the release.

== Reception ==
Grace Unplugged holds a 57% approval rating on aggregate review site Rotten Tomatoes with an average score of 5.4/10, based on seven reviews. At Metacritic, which assigns a weighted mean rating out of 100 to reviews from mainstream critics, the film received an average score of 39, based on five reviews, indicating "generally unfavorable" reviews.

Writing for the Los Angeles Times, Gary Goldstein said the film "proves a far more involving, accessible and enjoyable movie than its peek-a-boo marketing strategy suggested", praising its "smartly measured script". He called the story "gentle and largely convincing" and expected the film to "satisfy its intended audience and maybe even bring a few new viewers into the flock."

Variety's Joe Leydon wrote: "The makers of Grace Unplugged deserve at least some credit for resisting temptations toward melodramatic excess but even though they may be successful at preaching to the converted, their tepid and predictable pic isn't likely to attract crossover audiences."

Christa Banister of Crosswalk.com also wrote a mixed review: "Grace Unplugged is a movie with a message and strong production values. With compelling performances from the lead actors, a decent (read: mostly non-cringeworthy) script and cinematography that isn't embarrassingly dated." Nonetheless, Banister also echoed Leyondon's feeling that the film "won't resonate with many outside of the Church. Grace Unplugged, as accomplished as it is, can't help feeling like a missed opportunity. Instead of providing an intriguing window into how Christ-followers make crucial life decisions, it opts for the whole 'safe for the family' routine.

Frank Scheck of The Hollywood Reporter wrote that Grace Unplugged would "please its target audience while leaving everyone else indifferent", explaining the film is "ultimately bland to make much of an impact." He continued, "While the subject matter certainly seems rife with dramatic potential, the film handles it in sputtering, uncompelling fashion." The reviewer noted that Denton and Pollack's contributions "elevated the material". The New York Times's Andy Webster wrote that it "feels like a religious tract more than a movie."

Kenneth R. Morefield of Christianity Today gave the film two stars out of four: "It's not that Grace Unplugged has a bad message: it just doesn't happen to be a great movie. Because of that, it tries to sell its message, rather than integrate it into a dramatic or entertaining story." He felt the heroine was treated as a girl instead of an adult. Morefield continued: "A prodigal story is about humbling oneself, but without any genuine debasement in the second act, the third act return plays more like ritual shaming than genuine reconciliation." He, however, highlighted the actors' performances and noted the audience seemed to love the film.

== Awards ==
The film was awarded the Epiphany Prize® and the Grace Award (Presented to James Denton and AJ Michalka) at its 2014 MovieGuide Awards.
