= The Lears =

2017 film by Carl Bessai

- Directed by: Carl Bessai
- Screenplay by: Carl Bessai
- Based on: King Lear by William Shakespeare
- Produced by: Irwin Olian
- Starring: Bruce Dern; Anthony Michael Hall; Sean Astin
- Edited by: Jay Fox
- Music by: Mark Orton
- Production companies: NeoClassics Films; Raven West Films Ltd.
- Release date: April 22, 2017 (Nashville)
- Country: United States
- Language: English

The Lears is a 2017 American comedy-drama film based on William Shakespeare's King Lear. Directed by Carl Bessai, it stars Bruce Dern, Anthony Michael Hall and Sean Astin.

== Plot ==
On a family weekend, the father explodes a bombshell for his children that he will marry his assistant and everything gets complicated.

== Cast ==
- Bruce Dern as Davenport Lear
- Anthony Michael Hall as Glenn Lear
- Sean Astin as Tom Cornwall
- Aly Michalka as Regan Lear
- Victoria Smurfit as Diana
- Nicholas Bishop as Kent Lear
- James Hoare as Rory Lear

== Production ==
The film was shot in Malibu and Los Angeles.
