= Andy Landen =

Canadian film director (born 1981)

Andy Landen (born September 19, 1981) is a Canadian film director currently living in Los Angeles, California. Landen graduated from the USC School of Cinematic Arts in 2011.

Landen directed the feature film Sequoia, which premiered at the South by Southwest film festival in March, 2014. In June 2014, Landen directed the series 300 Sunnyside for Comedy Central.

In 2010, Landen's short film Message in a Bottle won the Coca-Cola Refreshing Filmmaker's Award. He also directed the 2011 series Do Whatever, for which he was awarded the Subway Fresh Artists Filmmakers Award.
