= Aly & AJ: Sister Act =

US television special

- Starring: Aly Michalka; AJ Michalka
- Country of origin: United States
- Original language: English
- No. of episodes: 1

Production
- Running time: 19 minutes

Original release
- Network: MTV
- Release: August 18, 2007

Aly & AJ: Sister Act is an MTV television special featuring behind the scenes look of the lives of musicians/actresses Aly Michalka and her younger sister by two years, AJ Michalka, better known as Aly & AJ. The special premiered on August 18, 2007, as part of a My Super Sweet 16 marathon named "Aly & AJ's Super Sweet Playlist" hosted by the sisters, in which the sisters commented on their favorite episodes of the series. It premiered with little advance publicity, but did have a segment of the Michalkas introducing the special, as well showcasing the MTV original television film Super Sweet 16: The Movie, which the Michalkas starred in.

The special showcased what goes on in the lives of the two sisters, such as getting their drivers license, first car, and writing the songs from their third album, Insomniatic.

The special was produced as a pilot for an intended series, but did not continue due to the Michalka's busy schedule at the time.
