= Hellcats =

American comedy-drama television series

- Genre: Comedy drama
- Created by: Kevin Murphy
- Based on: Cheer: Inside the Secret World of College Cheerleaders by journalist Kate Torgovnick
- Starring: Aly Michalka; Ashley Tisdale; Heather Hemmens; Robbie Jones; Matt Barr; Sharon Leal; Gail O'Grady
- Opening theme: "Belong Here" by 78violet
- Country of origin: United States
- Original language: English
- No. of seasons: 1
- No. of episodes: 22

Production
- Executive producers: Tom Welling; Kevin Murphy; Allan Arkush
- Production locations: Vancouver, British Columbia, Canada
- Running time: 41 minutes
- Production companies: Five & Dime Productions; CBS Television Studios; Bonanza Productions; Warner Bros. Television

Original release
- Network: The CW
- Release: September 8, 2010 – May 17, 2011

Hellcats is an American cheerleading comedy-drama television series that originally aired on The CW in the United States from September 8, 2010, to May 17, 2011. Based on the book Cheer: Inside the Secret World of College Cheerleaders by journalist Kate Torgovnick, the series focuses on the lives of college cheerleaders, mainly Marti Perkins (Aly Michalka), a pre-law college student who has to join the cheerleading team, the Hellcats, in order to get the athletic scholarship she needs. The main cast also includes Ashley Tisdale, Robbie Jones, Heather Hemmens, Matt Barr, Gail O'Grady, and Sharon Leal.

In May 2010, Hellcats had been picked by The CW for the fall 2010–11 season. Initially with a 13-episode order, The CW aired the series after America's Next Top Model on Wednesday nights. The pilot episode aired on September 8, 2010, and became the first-ever premiere to match or build on an America's Next Top Model lead-in since The CW began in 2006. The CW later gave a full season order for the series, with executives saying they were "thrilled that it paid off for us". On May 17, 2011, The CW announced that Hellcats would not be renewed for the 2011 fall schedule.

Hellcats has been described as "Election meets Bring It On" by critics, and received a mixed, but mostly positive, reception during its first season. The series also earned a nomination in the 2011 People's Choice Awards.

== Series overview ==
Hellcats follows Marti Perkins, a pre-law college student at Lancer University, who lost her scholarship and has no other choice but to join the college's cheer squad, the Hellcats, in order to obtain a new one. There she meets her new roommate and team captain Savannah Monroe, the injured flyer Alice Verdura, her new partner Lewis Flynn and the Hellcats coach Vanessa Lodge who hopes to win nationals, otherwise the cheer leading program will be cut. All the while, Marti also has to deal with her financially unstable and sometimes irresponsible mother, Wanda Perkins, whom she often has to bail out of difficult situations, and her best friend Dan Patch.

== Cast and characters ==
The main cast of Hellcats; from left to right: Heather Hemmens, Matt Barr, Aly Michalka, Robbie Jones, and Ashley Tisdale

=== Main cast ===
- Marti Perkins (Aly Michalka) is the protagonist of the series and a townie from Memphis, Tennessee. Described as "wicked smart", she is a pre-law student at Lancer University. Her mother, Wanda Perkins (Gail O'Grady), works at the university pub and is a party girl who never grew up. Her mother's behavior is, for the most part, an embarrassment to Marti. When Lancer's administrative department cuts scholarships for Lancer employees and families, Marti learns she can get a new one by choosing one of Lancer's programs. She then auditions for a position on Lancer's cheerleading team, the Hellcats.
- Savannah Monroe (Ashley Tisdale), the captain of the Hellcats, is described as "peppy and petite" with a "fierce intensity". She initially clashes with Marti, but realizes she is the godsend that the Hellcats need to win the championship. She votes for Marti when the team has auditions for a new flyer. Savannah is from a very religious, upper-middle class southern family. After a fight with her family, she left the university she was attending, Memphis Christian, and transferred to secular Lancer. Her sister Charlotte, a recurring role played by Emma Lahana, is the captain of the Cyclones, the cheerleading team at Savannah's old school and a Hellcats' rival.
- Alice (Heather Hemmens) is dangerously narcissistic and after she injures her wrist, she dislikes the idea of Marti replacing her on the squad, or the attention Marti receives from Alice's ex-boyfriend, Lewis Flynn.
- Lewis (Robbie Jones) is one of the Hellcats' bases and is an easy-going guy who has a love for action. He was once a star on the Lancer football team but quit when he discovered a scandal of players being paid by the college. He tried out for the Hellcats team when his then-girlfriend Alice encouraged him to do so in order to gain scholarship money after the football scandal, and instantly became hooked. He has an instant attraction to Marti. They later start dating.
- Dan Patch (Matt Barr) is a townie who is Marti's friend. He had an unspoken crush on her but now is dating Savannah, Marti's new friend on the team. He's of Irish descent with at least six siblings.
- Wanda Perkins (Gail O'Grady), Marti's mother.
- Vanessa Lodge (Sharon Leal) is a former Hellcat cheerleader who is now the team's coach. Her job is threatened if the Hellcats do not place at the national competition.

=== Supporting cast ===
- Red Raymond (Jeff Hephner), the Lancer's football coach who shares a romantic past with Vanessa
- Deirdre Perkins (Amanda Joy Michalka), Marti's half-sister
- Derrick Altman (D. B. Woodside), a doctor who works at Lancer University and is now Vanessa's boyfriend
- Bill Marsh (Aaron Douglas) is the college's athletic director who is still involved in a "pay for play" scandal with players that could get the school's programs (including the Hellcats) suspended
- Morgan Pepper (Craig Anderson) is a pre-law student and Marti's classmate. He later befriends Marti and joins her to solve a legal case introduced by their teacher
- Charlotte Munroe (Emma Lahana), Savannah's sister and a member of the Cyclones
- Julian (Gale Harold)
- Darwin (Jeremy Wong)
- Frankie (Alana Randall)
- Kathy (Magda Apanowicz) is a member of the Cyclones, usually called "Nasty Kathy".

== Production ==
=== Development ===
"Through that book we were able to understand that there was a whole world here that hadn't been tapped into and Kevin Murphy was able to go in and bring it to life and create this universe for these characters. I just think it's a great story. I think there's a lot of heart. I think there's a lot of struggle for all of our characters, especially our lead and her journey and her finding her identity and what she's going to do with her life. I just found that interesting."

— Tom Welling

Hellcats is based on the book Cheer: Inside the Secret World of College Cheerleaders by journalist Kate Torgovnick and the series has been described as "Election meets Bring It On". Actor Tom Welling teamed with Kevin Murphy to executive produce the series, which was initially given the name Cheer. The pilot episode was written by Murphy and directed by Allan Arkush. On May 18, 2010, The Hollywood Reporter, Variety and Entertainment Weekly reported that The CW had picked up the series for the 2010–2011 television season and confirmed that Paul Becker would be the head choreographer for the series. Tisdale's character was originally named Sierra Sloan but was renamed Savannah Monroe in the press release.

While presenting its 2010–11 season schedule on May 21, 2010, The CW officially confirmed the pick up of the series and announced its intention to air Hellcats after America's Next Top Model on Wednesday nights. TV Guide reported that Ashley Tisdale is the best paid of the cast, earning $30,000 per episode during the first season of the series.

During the 2010 Television Critics Association press tour in Los Angeles on July 29, 2010, producer Murphy said the series "was inspired by aspirational sports movies of the 1980s like Breaking Away, Vision Quest, and Pittsburgh-set Flashdance", and also added that "Hellcats is a show either for optimists or for people who are interested in learning the trade". Producer Welling said he was attracted to the series mainly because of the script, and he also felt the cheerleaders' world had not yet been tapped into on television. When asked why it picked up Hellcats, The CW replied saying the series is "one of the underdogs" and it liked the big production numbers.

The filming of the pilot episode took place in Vancouver, British Columbia, Canada between April 13–21, 2010. The filming of the next episodes of the first season began on July 14 in Vancouver. The cast had two weeks of rehearsal for the pilot episode but after the series' fall season pick up, they will only have a week to rehearse the dance numbers for each episode. Former Fame actress and choreographer Debbie Allen directed the episode "Pledging My Love".

The CW Network attempted to break the Guinness World Records mark for the "Largest Cheerleading Dance" at a single venue by inviting cheerleading squads to participate in a five-minute choreographed Hellcats dance in September 2010. The mark was not broken as there were not enough cheerleaders present.

=== Casting ===
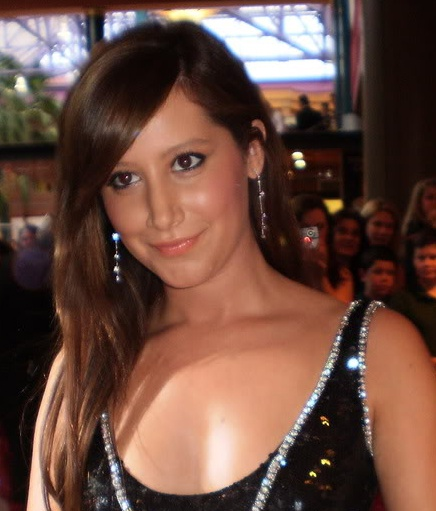
On why he cast Tisdale, Murphy said she can "hold multiple colors in the same palette."

On March 8, 2010, The Hollywood Reporter announced that Aly Michalka and Gail O'Grady were the first actresses to be cast in the series. Michalka would play the lead role of Marti Perkins, a college girl who decided to join the Hellcats, and O'Grady was to portray Wanda Perkins, Marti's mother. The site later announced that actress Ashley Tisdale was cast as Savannah Monroe (then known as Sierra Sloane), the fiercely intense captain of the Hellcats.

Matt Barr was cast as Dan Patch, a womanizer who quietly pines for Marti. On April 5, 2010, it was reported that actors Robbie Jones and Heather Hemmens were cast. Jones would portray the male lead, a cheerleading "base" who falls for Marti, and Hemmens to play a cheerleader sidelined with a wrist injury. On April 8, 2010, it was reported that actress Sharon Leal was cast as Vanessa Lodge, a former Hellcat star who now serves as the squad's coach. Elena Esovolva was cast as Patty "The Wedge" Wedgerman, a lesbian cheerleader and a base for the squad.

On April 14, 2010, it was announced that Ben Browder was cast as Red Raymond, Lancer University's football coach. On May 21, 2010, it was announced that the role was being recast and possibly retooled as well, although Browder had already shot scenes for the pilot episode. Raymond's role was later given to Jeff Hephner. On July 13, one day before the beginning of filming, D. B. Woodside was cast as Derrick Altman, a "handsome young physician who takes care of the Hellcats cheerleaders".

Producer Kevin Murphy confirmed that Gale Harold would guest star in the series as one of Marti's law professors. Michalka added that Harold would appear in the third episode of the first season and had a multiple-episode arc. In late November 2010, AJ Michalka was cast in a recurring role as a girl who works at a record store near Lancer University and befriends Marti. Camille Sullivan was added to the supporting cast in February 2011 to portray Red Reymond's ex-wife.

On January 18, 2011, it was announced that Esovolova would not be returning to the show. Michalka has said that it was difficult for the writers to incorporate her storylines with the others.

=== Music ===
During the 2010 Television Critics Association press tour held in Los Angeles on July 29, 2010, lead actresses Michalka and Tisdale were asked about the idea of singing on the show. They stated that they plan to keep their music careers separate from the series, although Michalka advised that she would sing in the fourth episode. In addition to that, Michalka's band 78violet recorded "Belong Here", which served as the theme song for Hellcats. It was later released into digital stores.

Executive producer Kevin Murphy confirmed in an interview that a soundtrack would be released for the series, which would include the theme song and other songs recorded for the series. He later added "So we are building a library of material. Once we have enough, we're gonna put it on iTunes and definitely do a soundtrack album." Songs covered for the series include "The Letter" originally by The Box Tops, Sting's "Brand New Day", Squeeze's "Tempted" and The Go-Go's hit "We Got the Beat". Canadian singer Fefe Dobson recorded "Rockstar", an exclusive song for the series that was played during the "A World Full of Strangers" episode. "Rockstar" was ultimately released on the iTunes Deluxe Edition of Dobson's album Joy. As previously promised by Murphy, a digital EP featuring five of the songs recorded for the series was released on November 30, 2010, via WaterTower Music.

The first season of Hellcats also included live performances by guest musicians, including Hey Monday, Faber Drive, Fefe Dobson, 3OH!3 featuring Ashley Tisdale, Elise Estrada and Ciara.

== Episodes ==
The first and only season of Hellcats consisted of 22 episodes. The pilot episode was broadcast on September 8, 2010. The initial order for the series was thirteen episodes. On September 23, 2010, due to successful ratings, The CW ordered six more scripts for the first season, although its production order was still at thirteen. On October 22, 2010, Variety announced that The CW had given a full season order for the series. The network said they took risks this year but they were "thrilled that they've paid off for us".

Hellcats aired on Wednesdays at 9–10 pm until December 1, 2010, when the eleventh episode aired. Starting January 25, 2011, The CW moved Hellcats to Tuesday nights at 9–10 pm, following One Tree Hill.

No.	Title	Directed by	Written by	Original release date	Prod. code	U.S. viewers (millions)
1	"A World Full of Strangers"	Allan Arkush	Kevin Murphy	September 8, 2010	2J5591	3.02
In order to gain a scholarship and stay in school, pre-law student Marti Perkins tries out for the cheerleading squad. She eventually makes it by becoming friends with Savannah Monroe, the head cheerleader. Marti does not get along with Alice Verdura, the cheerleader she replaced in the squad after a bad injury, but finds a fast friend in one of the Hellcats bases, Lewis Flynn.
2	"I Say a Little Prayer"	Allan Arkush	Story by : Kevin Murphy; Teleplay by : Kevin Murphy & Jennifer Schuur	September 15, 2010	2J5552	2.64
Marti realizes that Wanda is in the audience during qualifiers and banishes her from the stadium. Savannah must choose to stay and compete with the Hellcats or join her sister Charlotte who fell and injured herself when she was competing for the Hellcats' rival Memphis Christian College squad. The Hellcats arrange to switch places with another team, so they can postpone the competition and Savannah may be with her sister. Savannah leaves to take care of her sister though her sister does not welcome her pleasantly and her mother ignores her presence. Marti decides no to tell Wanda about her competition being postponed so she wouldn't assist. Savannah's mom invites her to a praying circle for Charlotte's health but it's the same time of the competition. Savannah confides in Marti about her uptight Christian parents disowning her because of her choice in transferring from Memphis Christian to the secular Lancer University; Marti confides in Savannah that in the past her mother's presence has also tensed her up, and made her lose her concentration (the reason she failed in a past gymnastics competition). Savannah competes (after saying a prayer to God for her family and her sister). Wanda shows up, though Marti initially begins to kick her out, she realizes her mom only attends because she is proud of her, and decides to let Wanda stay. In the end, Marti is able to perform, even with her mother's presence, and The Hellcats win the competition.
3	"Beale St. After Dark"	Bethany Rooney	Story by : Kevin Murphy; Teleplay by : Kevin Murphy & Peter Calloway	September 22, 2010	2J5553	2.32
Savannah goes on a date with Dan, and asks Marti and the rest of the squad to accompany her. Things get messy when Lewis spots Alice taking steroids from Lancer's star quarterback. When Lewis confronts Alice about it, a fight breaks out between the quarterback, Lewis and Dan (Dan was defending Savannah after she was pushed down while trying to break up the fight). The three are sent to jail, however, the football-fan sheriff lets the quarterback go. Lewis is worried he might lose his scholarship, so Savannah and Marti turn to Marti's law teacher to get the boys out in time. Meanwhile, Vanessa finally reveals to Derrick that she once had a relationship with Red.
4	"Nobody Loves Me But My Mother"	David Paymer	Anne Kenney	September 29, 2010	2J5554	2.22
Lewis asks Marti out, but she rejects him. Marti's mother employs the help of her daughter for a promotion at the bar. Meanwhile, Savannah brings Dan home to meet her family, but ends up fighting with her mother, who wants her to stop seeing Dan. Things start to get serious between them. Alice seeks Lewis' help for the bid video, but ends up getting more than Lewis bargained for. Marti then changes her mind and decides to go out with Lewis, and things get even more complicated when he has second thoughts.
5	"The Prisoner's Song"	John Behring	Curtis Kheel	October 6, 2010	2J5555	2.13
Savannah attempts to get Dan to direct the squad's bid video, but her idea clashes with Alice's. Meanwhile, Marti hopes to investigate Julian's case even further, concerning an inmate serving a life sentence for a crime he may not have committed. Also, Derrick punches Red, after Red says that he has returned to Lancer to get back Vanessa.
6	"Ragged Old Flag"	Kevin Fair	James Eagan	October 13, 2010	2J5556	2.01
Lewis coaches the Hellcats cheerleaders in a flag football game against the girls volleyball team. In an attempt to win the game, Alice secretly copies plays from the playbook of her boyfriend, who is coaching the opposition. Savannah convinces Alice that cheating is not the way to win. Meanwhile, Marti goes to a conference with Julian. Also, Lewis is upset at his father for accepting money from the school booster club. Marti and Lewis share an intimate moment.
7	"The Match Game"	John Dahl	Jennifer Schuur	October 27, 2010	2J5557	2.03
The Hellcats plan a date auction so they can raise funds to get them to Nationals, but things go awry after Savannah's old boyfriend, Noah, shows up. Meanwhile, Lewis and Marti start dating, and Marti wants to keep it a secret from everyone until they find out what's really going on between them.
8	"Back of a Car"	Allan Arkush	Kevin Murphy & Amanda Alpert Muscat	November 3, 2010	2J5558	1.94
The Hellcats plan an 80s party to celebrate their anniversary. Savannah decides to have a romantic evening with Dan, but the night doesn't end as well as she planned and Marti has conflicting feelings about Savannah and Dan's relationship moving forward. A local magazine shows more interest in doing a story on the Hellcats than the football team, which angers Bill Marsh.
9	"Finish What We Started"	Ron Underwood	Vince Gonzales	November 10, 2010	2J5559	1.92
Savannah fights with Marti after she finds out about her and Dan's past. Lewis overhears their argument and gets angry at Marti for keeping her past a secret. Savannah then decides to go home and spend some time re-connecting with her family. After a deep and honest talk with her sister, Charlotte (Emma Lahana), Savannah learns she is pregnant. Desperate to stop Charlotte from "flying" in their cheer leading routine, Savannah commits herself to being the flier in Charlotte's place. Conflicted over her feelings for Dan and Lewis, Marti decides to focus on Travis' case, but when Dan comes along for the stakeout things get worse; especially since Lewis apologizes for getting mad.
10	"Pledging My Love"	Debbie Allen	Peter Calloway	November 17, 2010	2J5560	2.04
When naked pictures of Alice lead to her public humiliation, Lewis & Jake (whom the pictures were meant for, but his phone was stolen during practice) decide to help her find the culprit. Marti clashes with Julian over representing Travis. Vanessa is frustrated about Derrick's work schedule and has a talk with Red, which stirs old feelings but in the end Derrick proposes in a very special way and she accepts. Both Dan and Marti are conflicted with their feelings for each other which makes Dan break up with Savannah.
11	"Think Twice Before You Go"	Dennie Gordon	Matthew B. Roberts	December 1, 2010	2J5561	1.89
Dan threatens to no longer be Marti's friend if she does not tell him how she feels and he tells her he wants to be with her but she says she's not in the same place. Savannah is upset and gets too drunk which puts her in a sticky situation with the host of the BBQ night, who attempts to rape her. Marti reveals her relationship with Dan to Savannah, Lewis and the rest of the squad. Dan leaves town, while sectionals are on the way. It is revealed that there is a bigger picture to Travis' case in which Bill Marsh is also involved.
12	"Papa, Oh Papa"	Andy Wolk	Kevin Murphy & Jennifer Schuur	January 25, 2011	2J5562	2.15
Alice gets a surprise visit from her father (Mario Van Peebles) and his new fiancée (Christine Lakin) who showed up to watch her fly causing Alice to blackmail Savannah into giving up her spot as a flyer by threatening to tell the squad that Savannah helped Memphis Christian get a free ride to the sectionals. Marti gets the cold shoulder on the bus on the way to the sectionals from the squad after admitting to hooking up with Dan. Lewis is shocked when he finds out Alice hasn't told her dad about the two of them breaking up and her not being a flyer anymore.
13	"Worried Baby Blues"	Ron Underwood	Kevin Murphy & Curtis Kheel	February 1, 2011	2J5563	1.80
The Hellcats shoot a sexy calendar for a fundraiser and throw a party with 3OH!3 performing. Marti and Alice break into Bill Marsh's office while Vanessa tries to sort out her feelings for Red. Savannah tells her mother that Charlotte is pregnant after Wanda's convincing.
14	"Remember When"	Omar Madha	Kevin Murphy & James Eagan	February 8, 2011	2J5564	1.72
Jake asks Alice to help him get the disk that holds his darkest secret but Alice refuses because she can't betray a fellow Hellcat but explains to Marti about the dire consequences if the secret comes out. Meanwhile, a desperate Marti calls Dan who once again says he can't help her. The Hellcats kidnap Marti for her "Initiation Ceremony" into the group. Savannah, Alice, Lewis and Vanessa flashback on how they became a part of the Hellcats which ultimately makes Marti realize that she can't make a decision on her own. Travis is beaten by two men in prison on Bill Marsh's appeal so he fires his lawyers "Marti, Morgan and Julian". When Marti receives news of what happened to Travis she and Savannah come clean to the squad and ask for support, which they ultimately get including Alice.
15	"God Must Have My Fortune Laid Away"	John Behring	Vince Gonzales & Matthew B. Roberts	February 15, 2011	2J5565	1.58
The Hellcats decide to throw a toga party as a last farewell. Meanwhile, Marti, Vanessa, Julian, and Red hatch a plan to take down Bill Marsh once and for all. Step 1 of the plan was for Red to have Bill say something threatening and betraying about Jake, which they recorded. Step 2 they ask that Jake confess to robbing the pharmacy so Travis can be set free but Jake refused and shut them down. They showed Jake the recording of Bill Marsh, but he stormed out angry. Hopeless, Marti goes to see Travis one more time where she tells him that Jake refused to confess so they are going to take this to the media. She tells him about their situation and Travis tries to stop Marti from letting down the Hellcats but Marti is still determined to set Travis free. On the other hand, Alice and Savannah invite firemen to their party. In the party Savannah seems to be getting along with the fireman Keith. After Marti comes to the party Alice questions her about Jake and finds him on the football field. Jake resists but Alice finally convinces him to confess and prays with him; regardless of her disbelief in God. Finally, Jake calls a press conference and confesses but to his surprise, everyone is proud of him and considers him a hero. Red, Julian and Marti blackmail Bill Marsh with his recording so he will retire without pension and he accepts. As Travis is leaving jail he makes eye contact with Jake while Jake is entering the jail. After Jake gets to his cell, Jake starts to cry. In the last scene we see the Hellcats singing "Redemption Song" in Cheertown with Travis, Marti's mom, Vanessa, Julian, Lewis, Savannah's sister and Morgan.
16	"Fancy Dan"	John Dahl	Anne Kenney	February 22, 2011	2J5566	1.64
Dan comes back for his brother's wedding, where Marti and Savannah both compete for the affections of Dan. While at the wedding, Marti performs, and she and Savannah both dress up in hope of winning Dan, however they later find out that Dan has a girlfriend whom he kisses in front of Savannah and Marti. Alice feels guilty about convincing Jake to confess and refuses to visit him in jail. However, a talk with Travis convinces her to go to him. Dan's father reminds him that Marti is not a good match for him as they are both "trainwrecks" but Savannah encourages Dan to be a better person and more mature. Marti and Dan agreeing to just stay friends and Dan reunites with Savannah after he asks for her forgiveness. Derrick is getting shipped out for a year with the army and asks Vanessa to marry him before he leaves. She initially agrees but at the last second cannot sign the marriage certificate. Derrick guesses that it's because of Red and breaks up with Vanessa, wishing her well for her future with Red. The episode ends with a kiss between Dan and Savannah.
17	"Don't Make Promises (You Can't Keep)"	Robert Berlinger	Amanda Alpert Muscat	March 1, 2011	2J5567	1.46
The Hellcats and Cyclones have a crisis when Alice discovers they have the same song for nationals, which causes problems. They compete by doing a routine in front of the band, which gave both teams permission to use the song, where the best routine claims the song for nationals. The band turns out to be lazy and rude drunks who pick the Hellcats due to their skimpier uniform. The Hellcats reject the song and the band, followed suit by the Cyclones. Savannah finds out the father of Charlotte's baby is her ex-boyfriend, Noah. Charlotte announces wedding plans with the baby's father, but an interrogation from Savannah forces Noah to admit that he has no feelings for Charlotte. Savannah tries to tell Charlotte that marrying Noah is a mistake because he doesn't love her, but she refuses to see sense. Eventually Charlotte realises that things won't work, and calls off the engagement. Travis slips about Marti's father with a song that Marti's father wrote, causing Marti to regain interest and confronting Wanda to find out more about him. Wanda continues to deny Marti information about her father, stating that he was simply a bad man. Marti doesn't accept this, and goes through her father's things in the hopes of getting to know him better.
18	"Woke Up Dead"	Andy Fickman	Jennifer Schuur	April 19, 2011	2J5568	1.19
The Hellcats help Dan with his short movie trailer, involving zombies. Marti continues to investigate into her father's past with help from Deirdre (AJ Michalka), a music store employee. Kelsey, a magazine reporter (who previously wrote a story on the Hellcats) convinces Alice to work with her in exposing athletes cheating on their assignments, with Lewis being one those athletes.
19	"Before I Was Caught"	Andy Wolk	Peter Calloway	April 26, 2011	2J5569	0.98
Marti is about to represent Lewis in the case concerning the cheating scandal, when it's discovered that he's actually covering up for Savannah. As Marti is working on the case, it becomes too personal for her and Julian. She feels a hint of jealousy after seeing all the couples together after she wins the cheating case and then goes to visit Julian in his 3-Strikes office, the episode ending in them both kissing.
20	"Warped Sister"	Tricia Brock	James Eagan	May 3, 2011	2J5570	1.01
Marti discovers more about her father, Rex, with Julian's help; she discovers that Deirdre is her half-sister, and their bond grows after a rocky start. Savannah loses her scholarship after her passing grade from a class is revoked because of her cheating, forcing her to ask her father for help with tuition money. Later, police arrest Savannah's dad on account of firewire and fraud, using the excuse of him writing a big check to Savannah. At Charlotte's baby shower, Lewis discovers the reason behind Savannah and Kathy's bitterness towards each other. Vanessa and Red continue to feel tension from Emily (Camille Sullivan), Red's ex-wife who is investigating the Lancer athletic department. The episode ends with Marti and Julian kissing again.
21	"Land of 1,000 Dances"	Debbie Allen	Curtis Kheel	May 10, 2011	2J5571	1.18
Marti is shocked to find out that Julian has a daughter and is finalizing a divorce with his soon-to-be ex-wife, and she asks him to help out Savannah's father in prison. Lewis and Kathy enter a dance competition to win a Toyota Rav-4 for Lewis's father, but Alice and Morgan enter too. Kathy's knee injury forces Alice and Lewis to partner up despite Alice's injured feet. Mr. Monroe is bailed out of prison but later goes on the run, apologizing to Savannah over the phone for disappointing her.
22	"I'm Sick Y'all"	Omar Madha	Kevin Murphy	May 17, 2011	2J5572	1.16
Strep throat hits Lancer, and the Hellcats find themselves a few members short as they prepare for Nationals, leaving the squad disqualified from competing. Charlotte goes into labor a month early and Savannah ditches Nationals to be at her sister's side. Marti and Deidre hit some major road bumps in their relationship, due to Deidre refusing to acclimate to Marti's cheerleading life. The sisters later patch things up until Marti learns that Deidre has been in contact with their father meaning that Deidre was lying to Marti from the moment they met.

== Reception ==
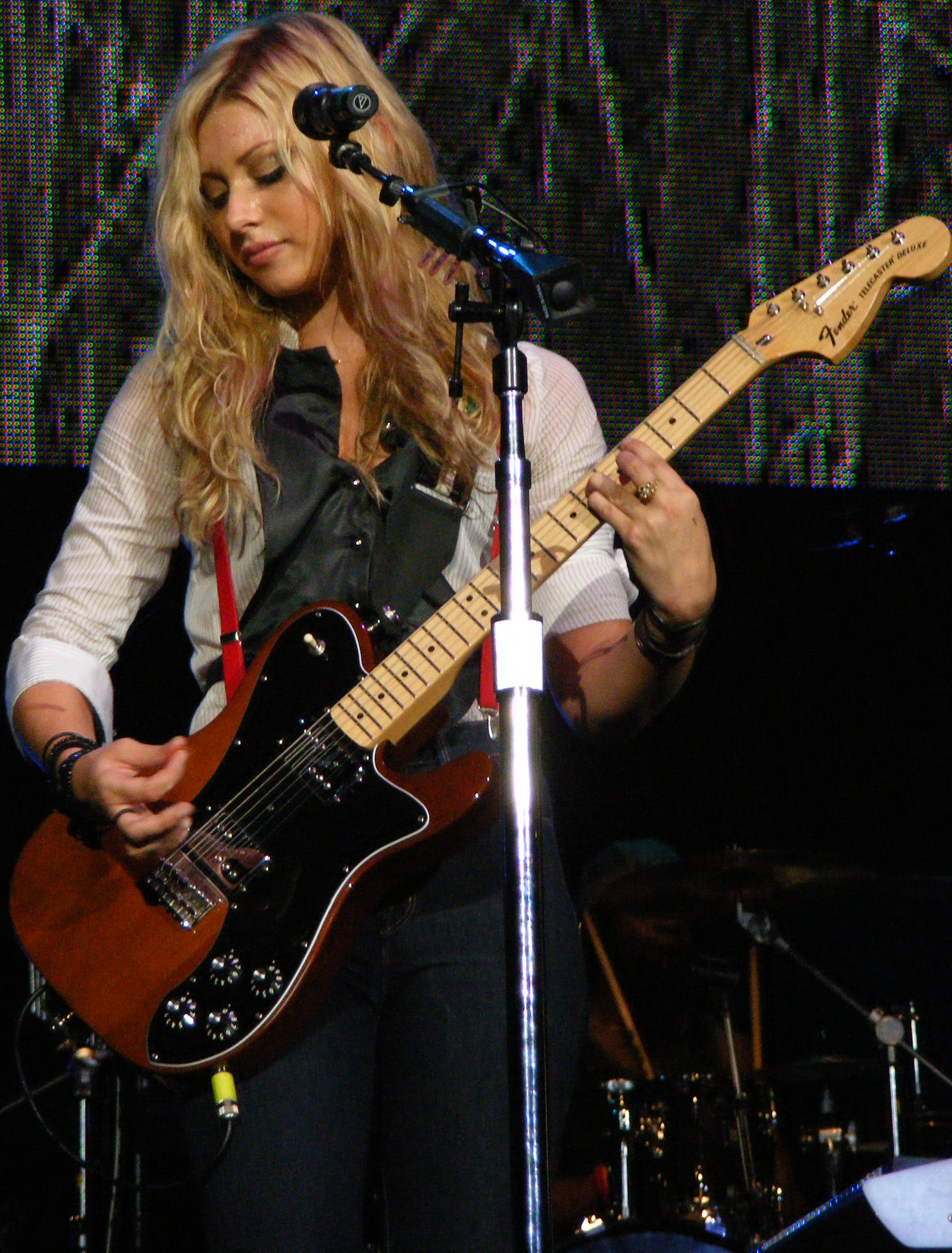
Los Angeles Times and Newsday praised Michalka by saying she has a big talent. The New York Times and Variety criticized her performance.

=== Critical reception ===
Hellcats has received mixed to positive reviews from television critics, with Rotten Tomatoes giving the show a 65% rating based on 23 reviews, with an average rating of 5.5/10, and Metacritic giving it a score of 51 out of 100, based on reviews from 22 critics. It was praised and criticized by critics in several round-up reviews of 2010 in television. Los Angeles Times had a good first impression of the pilot episode, saying Hellcats has a predictable story but, on the other hand, Michalka and Tisdale seem perfect for their roles. The newspaper also wrote the cheerleading world portrayed in the series is a "fun and deep world to explore". The journal later gave a complete review of the series, comparing it to 1983's film Flashdance aimed squarely at audiences too young for Gossip Girl but too old for Hannah Montana.

Verne Gay of Newsday praised Michalka's performance in the series, while The Hollywood Reporter praised the series itself and said it has "multilayered characters that defy expectations". Mara Reinstein of Us Weekly gave an early review of the first episode of the series, saying Hellcats has "plenty of winning elements" but added that the series lacks spirit. She also praised the performance and Marti's relationship with her mother. ABC News listed Hellcats as one of the ten best new shows of 2010's fall season and described the series as "almost laughably formulaic" and added it "works like a charm". Brian Lowry of Variety praised the series' promise, and said that the series has a Glee-like element in the script, while also criticizing Michalka and acclaiming O'Grady's performance. Lowry also added Hellcats's premiere "isn't quite unabashedly trashy enough to completely qualify as a guilty pleasure".

Curt Wagner of ChicagoNow said the series is predictable and has unrealistic situations, and criticized the lack of fun in the jokes. The journal also praised Tisdale's performance, claiming she was the one who made him laugh the most. Alessandra Stanley of The New York Times criticized Michalka's performance and called the series a "soft-porn music video for teenagers". Washington Post's Hank Stuever was critical about the pilot episode, describing it as "mean-spirited, painfully dumb and badly acted". He also wrote Hellcats is the opposite to Fox's Glee.

=== Ratings ===
The pilot episode "A World Full of Strangers" averaged a total of 3.0 million viewers and scored a 2.0 rating in the network's target audience of women 18–34, which marks the first premiere to ever match or build on an America's Next Top Model lead-in since The CW began. Hellcats also delivered the largest non-Top Model performance in The CW's Wednesday 9–10 pm time period in 3 years since the Gossip Girl series premiere. On September 10, the network aired an encore of the pilot episode which averaged a total of 2.42 million viewers and won the hour with adults 18–49.

Hellcats delivered The CW's most watched Tuesday of the season with 2.2 million viewers watching "Papa, Oh Papa", its 12th episode and the first in its new Tuesday 9–10 pm timeslot. Ratings fell rapidly as the series progressed, with the nineteenth episode, "Before I Was Caught", hitting a series low, with less than a million viewers watching it on April 27, 2011. The finale was watched by 1.16 million viewers.

The series averaged 2.11 million viewers with live +7 day DVR viewing.

=== Awards and nominations ===
Year	Award	Category	Result	Notes
2011	People's Choice Awards	Favorite New TV Drama	Nominated	
2011	Golden Reel Awards	Best Sound Editing: Short Form Musical in Television	Nominated	"Back of a Car"

== Broadcast ==
While presenting its 2010–11 season schedule on May 21, 2010, The CW announced its intention to air Hellcats in the United States after America's Next Top Model on Wednesday nights starting September 8, 2010, at 9 pm. The series moved to Tuesday nights in the 9–10 pm timeslot, starting with the twelfth episode. Hellcats has been syndicated for broadcast in several countries worldwide, including Australia, Canada, Greece, Ireland, Israel, United Kingdom, Brazil, Spain, the Arab World, Latin-America, New Zealand, and Denmark.

== Cancellation and possible reboot ==
According to the producer, Tom Welling, he states that the reason of cancellation was due to the change of CW president of entertainment from Dawn Ostroff to Mark Pedowitz. He also said that there was a possibility of a reboot of the series with a new cast and cameos from the previous cast if enough fans continue to watch the original series on CW Seed.

== Streaming ==
The series is available to stream on Tubi in the US and ITVX in the UK. It previously was on The CW's free digital-only network, CW Seed.
