= Cow Belles =

2006 American film

- Promotional advertisement
- Written by: Matt Dearborn; Stu Krieger
- Directed by: Francine McDougall
- Starring: Alyson Michalka; Amanda Michalka
- Theme music composer: Aly & AJ; Kenneth Burgomaster
- Country of origin: United States
- Original language: English

Production
- Executive producer: Sheri Singer White
- Producer: Kevin Lafferty
- Cinematography: Tony Westman
- Editor: Terry Blythe
- Running time: 88 minutes
- Production companies: Spotted Cow Productions; Just Singer Entertainment
- Budget: $5 million

Original release
- Network: Disney Channel
- Release: March 24, 2006

Cow Belles is a 2006 romantic teen comedy Disney Channel Original film that stars American pop recording artists Alyson Michalka and Amanda Michalka, better known as sister duo Aly & AJ. It premiered on March 24, 2006, on the Disney Channel and was watched by over 5.8 million viewers.

On May 10, 2019, Aly & AJ revealed that they're working on a sequel for Cow Belles.

== Plot ==
Taylor (Alyson Michalka) and Courtney Callum (Amanda Michalka) are two thoroughly spoiled yet well-intentioned sisters whose widower father, Reed Callum (Jack Coleman), owns Callum Dairy. The girls' mother died prior to the events of the movie: therefore, their house keeper Corrine helps take care of the girls now. Taylor has just gotten her driver's license, after almost failing the test at the beginning of the movie. After she gets her license, the girls leave to depart for a shopping trip, but leave a towel on the stove, causing a house fire, and previously, Taylor accidentally sinks her friends pickup truck while learning to drive stick. Shocked by their carelessness and over spending, Reed decides that the girls should start making their own cash and puts them to work at the dairy to teach them responsibility. After this decision is made, he goes out of town; looking for a rare butterfly to add to his collection. However, the situation leaves the girls to look after the dairy.

When the girls start working at the dairy, it quickly becomes their worst nightmare. They mess up almost every step of the way, such as dropping Courtney's cell phone into one of the full yogurt cups, and then tripping and splashing blueberries on themselves. All the employees think they are stuck-up and don't believe that they can do their job. Soon after they start working there and doing their jobs better, someone steals all the money out of the businesses' bank account. It is then up to the girls to come up with a plan to save the dairy, and the jobs of those who are working, but no one believes in them. Taylor has changed her nature and asks Courtney if she can use her party money to pay for the employees' paychecks, or else they will leave Callum Dairy. Taylor and Courtney are at a meeting with the other employees when Taylor tricks Courtney into leaving to get her cell phone, she says that she will get the money, but still no one believes her. Without consulting Courtney, Taylor uses her party money for the employees, thus causing a very big fight between the two of them.

Taylor and Courtney finally enjoy their work in the factory and earn the employees' belief and respect. However, Courtney ignores Taylor in every possible way. They have a fight at work when Courtney is putting in the numbers for the expiration dates. Even though they have the money to pay the employees' paychecks, Courtney's mistake threatens their business because the milk, believed to be expired, is sent back. Their employers realize this will take them all night and that they will miss the deadline, but Reed comes along with volunteers, mostly town folks (including the wealthy ones who attended Courtney and her friends' debutante) who are impressed with the sisters' efforts to save the beloved dairy company. They manage to pull through the evening and the employees and town folks celebrate. It is revealed that his business partner and best friend Bob Fenwick is the thief, but he gets away with the money. After checking his finances, Reed determines that the dairy will survive, but that money will be tight for some time. The girls happily volunteer to work with him even when he gives them the day off to help out.

In an alternate ending, Courtney finds a way to track Reed's friend who stole the money. The girls show their father a footage of the embezzler playing in a casino in Puerto Rico, and Reed alerts the FBI to catch him. Despite getting their money back, the sisters continue working in the dairy in the hopes of one day succeeding their father.

== Cast ==
- Alyson Michalka as Taylor Callum
- Amanda Michalka as Courtney Callum
- Jack Coleman as Reed Callum
- Sheila McCarthy as Fran Walker
- Michael Trevino as Jackson Meade
- Christian Serratos as Heather Perez
- Ron Gabriel as Melvin Melville
- Chris Gallinger as Phillipe
- Von Flores as Nick Perez
- Alex Hood as Richie Miller
- Sharon McFarlane as Doris Miller
- Sandy Robson as Thomas
- Craig Eldridge as Wilbur Meade
- Paula Brancati as Sarah Van Dyke
- Amanda Tilson as Jenny Bryant
- Diana Peressini as Marissa Wentworth
- Michael Rhoades as Bob Fenwick
- Duane Murray as Pete "Big Pete"
- Dylan Roberts as Ralph
- Ordena Stephens-Thompson as Joyce
- Stuart Clow as Keith Walker
- Beatriz Pizano as Gina Perez
- Jean Yoon as Corrine
- Scotty Watson as Larry

== Production ==
The movie was inspired by Fox TV series The Simple Life, which formerly starred Paris Hilton and Nicole Richie. The movie was filmed in Toronto, Canada in 2005.

== Soundtrack ==
The soundtrack is composed of one single On the Ride, performed by Aly & AJ. Its music video features scenes from the movie merged in it and this song is featured in the movie.

== Release ==
- The DVD was released on June 27, 2006, with special features such as behind-the-scenes featurette and music videos.
- Family in Canada first aired Cow Belles on June 30, 2006.
- Cow Belles premiered on Disney Channel Asia on August 6, 2006 (original ending version) and November 19, 2006 (alternate ending version).
- Its premiere was watched by over 5.8 million viewers, making it the fifth most viewed Disney Channel Original Movie as of 2007.
- Cow Belles debuted on U.L television on March 29, 2006, to 2.04 million viewers.
- Cow Belles debuted on Disney Channel Latin America on June 12, 2009.

== Reception ==
Jeff Swindoll of the Monsters and Critics website said, "Not too bad and a perfect time killer for the kids. I'd suggest a rental for family movie night. Maybe the lessons the girls learn in the [film] will cross over to the audience." Kevin Carr of 7M Pictures said, "Cow Belles follows the Disney formula perfectly. It stars two hot, young singing sensations, who have a contract with the Disney recording branch. If you frequent the Disney Channel often on the dial, you'll recognize Alyson Michalka as Keely from Phil of the Future. These girls are next in line to take over where Hilary Duff and Lindsay Lohan left the stage. Overall, Aly and AJ are decent actors and carry the film as best they can. Aly has a stronger, more mature part, and it shows that she at least has a little more camera time on her sister. However, the casting of the sisters works well as they have good chemistry. Ultimately, these two make a better pair than Haylie and Hilary Duff ever did." Commonsense Media said, "Parents need to know that this film might at first seem to tell kids that the sisters' frivolous lifestyle is desirable and that their carefree, irresponsible behavior is something to aspire to. But things turn around when the girls finally realize the value of hard-earned money, learn about responsibility, and gain respect for people who must work for a living. While adults may not find this quick turnaround believable, the movie's overall intention is good." Ultimate Disney reviewed the DVD saying "Cow Belles has its fair share of flaws but redeems itself with a solid story and a surprise or two by the end. Like the milk in the movie, the bonus features are skim, and the audio/video presentation could use some improvement. The price tag for this one is a little higher than your average DCOM too, so a purchase may not be quite warranted. Still, those who have taken a liking to Disney Channel features in the past should give this one a try, so a rental is recommended.".

== Sequel ==
On May 10, 2019, Aly & AJ revealed that they're working on a sequel for Cow Belles.
