= Ice Princess =

2005 film by Tim Fywell

- Theatrical release poster
- Directed by: Tim Fywell
- Screenplay by: Hadley Davis
- Story by: Meg Cabot; Hadley Davis
- Produced by: Bridget Johnson
- Starring: Joan Cusack; Kim Cattrall; Michelle Trachtenberg; Hayden Panettiere
- Cinematography: David Hennings
- Edited by: Janice Hampton
- Music by: Christophe Beck
- Production companies: Walt Disney Pictures; Bridget Johnson Films; On The Ice Productions
- Distributed by: Buena Vista Pictures Distribution
- Release date: March 18, 2005 (United States)
- Running time: 98 minutes
- Country: United States
- Language: English
- Budget: $25 million
- Box office: $25.7 million

Ice Princess is a 2005 American teen sports comedy-drama film directed by Tim Fywell, written by Hadley Davis from a story by The Princess Diaries creator Meg Cabot and Davis. It stars Joan Cusack, Kim Cattrall, Michelle Trachtenberg and Hayden Panettiere. The film focuses on Casey Carlyle, a normal teenager who gives up a promising future academic life in order to pursue her new-found dream of being a professional figure skater.

The film was released by Walt Disney Pictures on March 18, 2005, to mixed reviews and underperformed at the box office, grossing $25.7 million during its theatrical run against a production budget of $25 million. It has since gained a cult following, especially in the aftermath of the early passings of Trachtenberg and Panettiere.

== Plot ==
In the city of Millbrook, Connecticut, Casey Carlyle, a very smart and talented science student, pursues a scholarship to Harvard University. For the scholarship, she must present a personal summer project about physics. While watching a figure skating competition with her mathematically inclined best friend, Ann, Casey realizes that her favorite childhood hobby, ice skating, would make a perfect project. She decides to try to improve her own skating by applying physics and what she has discovered from watching other skaters.

Following a recital, Casey becomes proficient and skips two levels to become a junior skater. She helps fellow junior skaters Gennifer "Gen" Harwood, Tiffany Lai, and Nikki Fletcher improve their skating by using algorithms generated by her computer. Torn between her Harvard dream and her growing love of skating, Casey has difficulty juggling schoolwork, skating, and a part-time job as a concessions worker; during this time, she develops a relationship with Gen's brother, Teddy. Her mother, Joan, attempts to prevent her from skating due to her declining academic performance. Meanwhile, tension arises between Joan and Gen's mother, Tina, a disgraced former skater who has since become a coach.

Tina, who manages the rink where Casey trains, has Gen on a strict training program. During a competition where both Casey and Gen compete, Tina sees Casey may outrank Gen and sabotages Casey's performance by buying her new skates. Unaware of the danger of unbroken-in skates, Casey's resulting long program is riddled with poor jumps and several falls. Upon being informed of Tina's intent behind her seemingly kind gesture by fellow skate competitor Zoey Bloch, Casey lashes out at her and mistakenly assumes her children were equally involved in the plot. She ranks fifth in the competition but only the top 4 qualify for the sectionals. As a result, Casey loses interest in skating and returns to her studies and goal of attending Harvard.

Upset at her mother's sabotage and frustrated by all the restrictions of training, Gen quits, inadvertently allowing Casey to take her spot. While Casey and Gen reconcile, Casey can now qualify for the sectionals as Gen quit. She declines the Harvard scholarship competition to devote herself to skating, to Joan's dismay. Casey also reconciles with Tina and asks her to be her personal coach and train for the sectionals. Joan, frustrated at this change of direction in her life, refuses to watch her skate.

At the sectionals, Casey initially struggles, and falls while attempting a triple salchow jump. She is reinvigorated by the arrival of Joan in the audience. Inspired by this, she gives a highly rated artistic performance and eventually reconciles with Joan. The sectionals ends with Casey placing silver, qualifying to go to Nationals and potentially the 2006 Winter Olympics. Teddy gives Casey flowers to congratulate her, and they kiss. Later, Joan and Tina, despite burying the hatchet as well, bicker about how many college courses Casey should take, the budding love between her and Teddy, her sponsors, and her future in figure skating.

== Cast ==
- Joan Cusack as Joan Carlyle
- Kim Cattrall as Tina Harwood
- Michelle Trachtenberg as Casey Carlyle
- Hayden Panettiere as Gennifer "Gen" Harwood
- Trevor Blumas as Teddy Harwood
- Erik King as Dr. Chip Healey
- Diego Klattenhoff as Kyle Dayton
- Kirsten Olson as Nikki Fletcher
- Signe Ronka as Emma Flanders
- Juliana Cannarozzo as Zoey Bloch
- Paul Sun-Hyung Lee as Mr. Lai
- Martha MacIsaac as Mean Party Girl
- Connie Ray as Mrs. Fletcher
- Michelle Kwan as ESPN reporter
- Brian Boitano as ESPN reporter
- Jocelyn Lai as Tiffany Lai
- Shanique Ollivierre-Lake as Chantal DeGroat
- Amy Stewart as Ann
- Kristina Whitcomb as Ms. Fisher Lee

== Production ==
Blumas said that he was put on hold for two months during the audition process and that there had been "a lot of switch-overs with the directors". Blumas ended up playing Teddy as a sort of father figure to Gen. He began training to drive a Zamboni soon after arriving in Toronto; according to him, he later ended up smoothing the ice on some mornings at the rink where they were shooting. Panettiere did much of her own skating, including a fast spin seen at the end of the regionals short program. Trachtenberg trained for eight months, including the time they were filming (during which time she says she worked twenty-hour days). She had to be on the ice longer than most of the other actors as she was one of the few adults on the film. She had stunt doubles to handle the falls and some of the complex moves, although Trachtenberg did learn a specific move that could not be done by a stunt double as the differences in their build would be apparent. She sustained some injuries while working on the film. According to Trachtenberg, a mistake was made in one of the physics formulas her character recites, which was later fixed; a shot of the back of her head was used and the correct term was looped in. Trachtenberg described the film as "not a Disney kitschy movie" and was somewhat apprehensive of the idea of a sequel for fear of belittling the original. Cusack noted that the relationship between Casey and her mother had already been well-developed in the script, but said that it generated a good deal of discussion during the production, and Cusack ultimately described her role as "meaningful" in terms of the acting and also how it related to her personally.

The film was shot from May 3 to July 23, 2004 at several locations in Toronto, including George Bell Arena, Western Technical-Commercial School, Christie Mansion and De La Salle College.

== Reception ==
=== Box office ===
In its opening weekend, the film grossed $6,807,471 in 2,501 theaters in the United States and Canada, ranking #4 at the box office, behind The Ring Two, Robots and The Pacifier. By the end of its run, Ice Princess grossed $24,381,334 domestically and $1,351,000 internationally, totaling $25,732,334 worldwide.

=== Critical reception ===
Ice Princess received mixed critical reviews, with praise towards the casting and performances of the four leading actresses, but with criticism towards its predictable, formulaic plot. On Rotten Tomatoes, the film has a score of 52% based on 108 reviews, with an average rating of 5.6/10. The consensus reads: "This likable Disney film gets points for effort, but can't stick the landing when it comes to originality". Metacritic, which uses a weighted average, assigned the film a score of 55 out of 100, based on 27 critics, indicating "mixed or average" reviews. Film critic Roger Ebert gave Ice Princess three out of four stars and commended the film for its entertaining nature and ability to overcome cliche and "formula". Todd Gilchrist of IGN questioned the speed at which Casey becomes adept at skating and pointed out some other improbabilities and clichés, but strongly praised Cusack's and Cattrall's performances as emotionally powerful and fully human. United States Conference of Catholic Bishops' Office for Film and Broadcasting rated the film A-I (suitable for general patronage) and provided the film a modest praise as a good family film. Oppenheim Toy Portfolio awarded the film their platinum award. It is rated G by the Motion Picture Association of America.

== Legacy ==
Zahra Lari, a figure skater from the United Arab Emirates, cited Ice Princess as an inspiration for her career. Following Trachtenberg's death in 2025, many skaters on social media also stated that the film, and Trachtenberg's character especially, were inspirations for taking up the sport. The impact of the film was further noted following Panettiere's death in 2026.

== Soundtrack ==
Ice Princess: Original Soundtrack

Soundtrack album by various artists
- Released: March 15, 2005
- Genre: Pop
- Length: 45:37
- Label: Walt Disney
- Producers: Desmond Child; Matthew Gerrard; Greg Kurstin; Jamie Houston; Leah Haywood; Daniel James

Singles from Ice Princess: Original Soundtrack
- 1. "No One" Released: March 18, 2005

Professional ratings
Review scores
Source	Rating
Allmusic	3/5 stars

Chart positions for Ice Princess Original Soundtrack
Chart (2005)	Peak position
Billboard 200	53
Billboard Top Soundtracks	2

Ice Princess: Original Soundtrack was released on March 15, 2005, in the United States by Walt Disney Records, features tracks by Natasha Bedingfield, Emma Roberts, Hayden Panettiere, Katrina Elam, Aly & AJ, Jesse McCartney, and Raven-Symoné, and various others. It peaked at number 53 on the Billboard 200 and at number 2 on Top Soundtracks.

Track listing

1. "Reach" – Caleigh Peters
2. "If I Had It My Way" – Emma Roberts
3. "Get Your Shine On" – Jesse McCartney
4. "You Set Me Free" – Michelle Branch
5. "Reachin' for Heaven" – Diana DeGarmo
6. "No One" – Aly & AJ
7. "It's Oh So Quiet" – Lucy Woodward
8. "Get Up" – Superchick
9. "I Fly" – Hayden Panettiere
10. "Just a Dream" – Jump5
11. "Bump" – Raven-Symoné
12. "There Is No Alternative" – Tina Sugandh
13. "Unwritten" – Natasha Bedingfield

Not included on the soundtrack.

- "Freak Out" by Avril Lavigne appears in the official trailer but is not included on the soundtrack.
- “Doin’ Fine” by Jewel appears during the scene where Casey first goes to the Harwood Skate Club.
- "Ray of Light" by Madonna is used as Casey Carlyle's short program music but is not included on the soundtrack.
- Instrumental versions of "Trouble" by Pink and "Toxic" by Britney Spears were used for Zoey Bloch's short program and free skate, respectively, but not included on the soundtrack.
- "Galop infernal (Can-can)" by Jacques Offenbach and the theme from The Pink Panther were used for Nikki Fletcher's short program and free skate, respectively, but not included on the soundtrack.
- "Summer" from Antonio Vivaldi's The Four Seasons was used for Gen's short program, but not included on the soundtrack.

== Home media ==
The film was released on DVD and VHS on July 19, 2005. It has also been available on Disney+ since its launch on November 12, 2019.
