= No One (Aly & AJ song) =

Single by Aly & AJ

from the album Into the Rush and Ice Princess Original Soundtrack
- Released: March 18, 2005
- Recorded: 2004
- Length: 2:58
- Label: Hollywood
- Songwriters: Alyson Michalka, Amanda Michalka, Carlos Tornes
- Producer: Jon Lind

Aly & AJ singles chronology
"Do You Believe in Magic" (2005)	"No One" (2005)	"Never Far Behind" (2005)

"No One" is a song recorded by American pop rock duo Aly & AJ for their debut album Into the Rush. The song was released digitally as the second single from the aforementioned album on March 18, 2005. It was later included on Radio Disney's playlist, to promote Into the Rush. The song was also used during the main titles of the Walt Disney Pictures film Ice Princess.

== Music video ==
Even though of being a Radio Disney-only single, a video was still made to promote the album and film. The clips includes some of the major parts from the Walt Disney Pictures film Ice Princess, intertwined with parts containing Aly & AJ. The sisters are shown in a house playing their guitars and singing.

== Track listings ==
Digital download
No.	Title	Length
1.	"No One"	2:58

== Release history ==
Date	Country	Format	Label
March 18, 2005	United States	Digital download	Hollywood Records
