= Super Sweet 16: The Movie =

2007 television film directed by Neema Barnette

- DVD cover
- Written by: Andrew Cochran; Charlie Jordan Brookins
- Directed by: Neema Barnette
- Starring: Aly Michalka; AJ Michalka; Regine Nehy; Brendan Miller; Roddy Piper; Paula DeAnda
- Music by: Ray Chew
- Country of origin: United States
- Original language: English

Production
- Producer: Lesile Belzberg
- Cinematography: Edward J. Pei
- Editor: Skip Macdonald
- Running time: 86 minutes
- Production company: MTV Studios

Original release
- Network: MTV
- Release: July 8, 2007

Super Sweet 16: The Movie is a television film based on the series My Super Sweet 16. It stars teen popstars Aly & AJ, R&B & Soul star Paula DeAnda and features performances by Hellogoodbye and Pretty Ricky. The film stars Amanda Michalka and Regine Nehy. The film premiered on MTV on July 8, 2007, and the DVD was released on July 10, 2007, the same date that Aly & AJ's third studio album Insomniatic was released as well as DeAnda's Easy (Paula DeAnda song).

== Plot ==
The film centers on best friends Sara (Amanda Michalka) and Jacquie (Regine Nehy). They share everything, including the same birthday, which they always celebrate together. Sara and Jacquie start making plans for a huge "Sweet 16" party for the both of them, all with proceeds going to a charity called "Hollywood Heart". However, when Jacquie transfers to the school Sara goes to, a rich girl called Taylor makes friends with Jacquie (because Taylor never had a sweet sixteen) and then proceeds to change Jacquie to be more like herself in order to destroy Sara and Jacquie's relationship. Jacquie unwittingly falls into her plan. Sara tries to deal with Jacquie's personality change until Jacquie starts insisting to make Taylor a party planner, something that Sara hates. This leads to many more arguments until finally, the two split the party and compete with each other to have the biggest party, all while insulting each other. At the same time, Alicia (Paula DeAnda) is making her way through the movie as an unexpected romance occurs between Shannon, Taylor's brother, and Sara.

== Cast ==
- Amanda "AJ" Michalka: Sara Connors
- Regine Nehy: Jacquie Anderson
- Brendan Miller: Shannon Plimpton
- Alyson "Aly" Michalka: Taylor Tiara/Plimpton
- Ethan Phillips: Craig
- Roddy Piper: Mitch Connors
- Sicily Sewell: Chloe Spears
- Nikki Flores: Zoey Cortez
- Shanica Knowles: Sierra
- Paula DeAnda: Alicia
- Cassie Steele: Sophie Barnetz
- Brandon T. Jackson: Brian
- Rocco Vienhage: Coleman Palm
- Renee Olstead: Sky Storm
- Debra Wilson: Edan Day
- Tina Knowles: herself
- Katherine J: Hannah
- J Xavier: Randy
- Sarya Jackson: young Jacquie Anderson

== Full release dates ==
- United States: July 8, 2007, on MTV and July 29, 2007, on The N
- United States: July 10, 2007, on DVD
- New Zealand: October 13, 2007, on MTV
- Australia: October 13, 2007, on MTV
- Mexico: October 12, 2007, on MTV
- Paraguay: November 24, 2007, on MTV
- The Netherlands: December 26, 2007, on MTV

== See also ==
- My Super Sweet 16
- My Super Psycho Sweet 16
