= Never Far Behind =

Single by Aly & AJ

from the album Into the Rush (Christian Edition)
- Released: October 10, 2005
- Genre: Christian rock
- Length: 3:19
- Label: Hollywood
- Songwriters: Jeremy Bose, Paul Robert Evens, Matt Bronlewee

Aly & AJ singles chronology
| "No One" (2005) | "Never Far Behind" (2005) | "Rush" (2006) |

"Never Far Behind" is a contemporary Christian song recorded by American pop rock duo Aly & AJ for the Christian edition of their debut album Into the Rush. The single was only released on Christian radio stations in October 2005. It went to number one on Radio & Records (R&R) Christian CHR. This is the second Aly & AJ song to have an official release to a radio format other than Radio Disney. So far, there have only been four ("Rush", "Never Far Behind", "Chemicals React", and "Potential Breakup Song"). The song was later also included on the deluxe edition of Into the Rush, which was released on August 8, 2006.

== Production ==
The song was originally written and recorded for the soundtrack of The Chronicles of Narnia: The Lion, The Witch and The Wardrobe but was not included in it.

== Track listing ==
Digital download/Promo CD (U.S., March 1, 2006)
| No. | Title | Length |
|---|---|---|
| 1. | "Never Far Behind" | 3:19 |

== Charts ==
| Chart | Peak position |
|---|---|
| U.S. Billboard Hot Christian Songs | 28 |
