= AJ Michalka =

American actress and singer

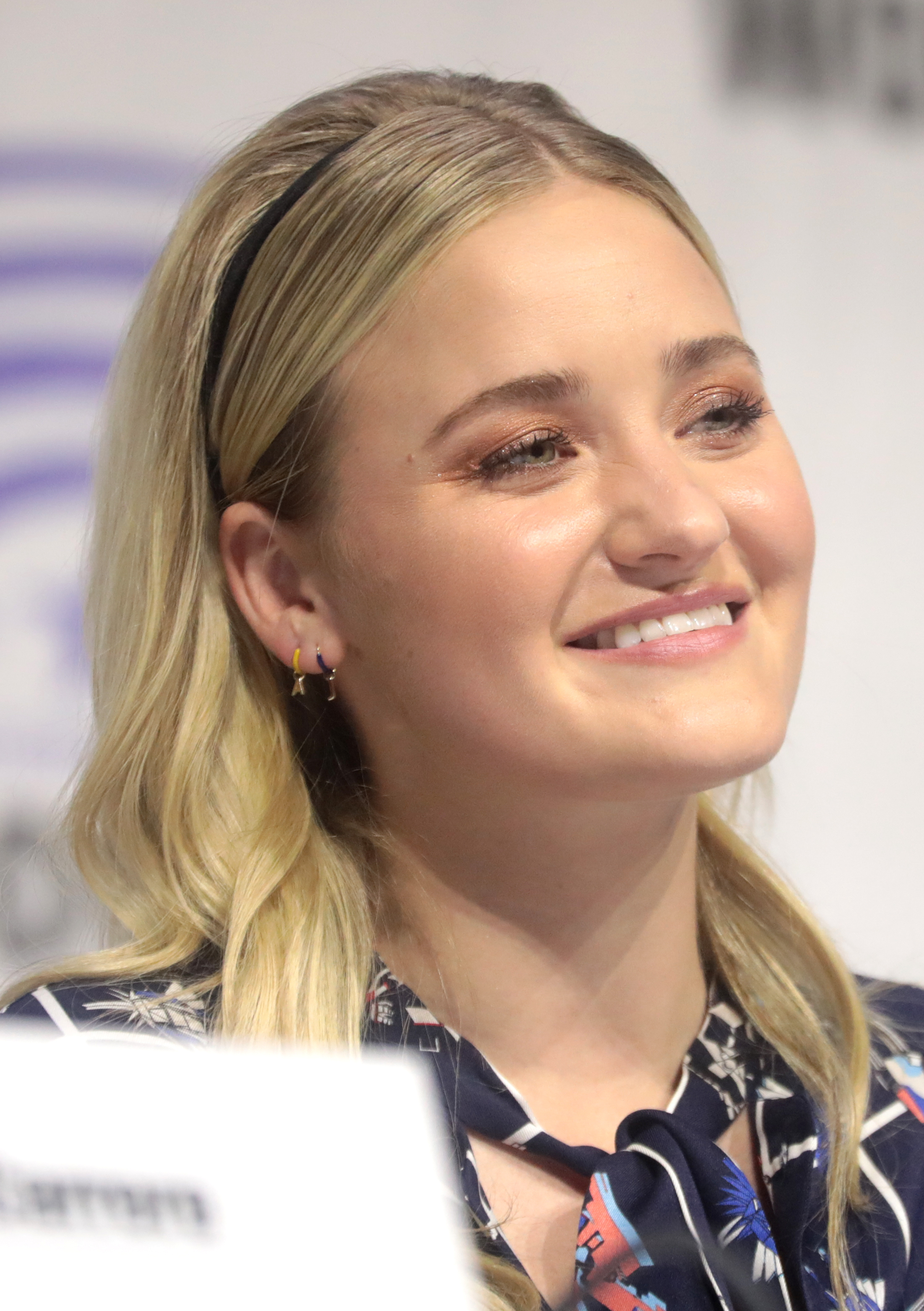
- Michalka at WonderCon in 2019
- Born: Torrance, California, U.S.
- Occupations: Actress; musician; singer; songwriter
- Years active: 2002–present
- Works: Discography; songs
- Relatives: Aly Michalka (sister)
- Musical career
- Genres: Pop; pop rock; indie pop; synth-pop
- Labels: Hollywood; AWAL
- Member of: Aly & AJ

AJ Michalka (/miːˈʃɑːkə/ mee-SHAH-kə; is an American actress, musician and singer-songwriter who is one half of the musical duo Aly & AJ (briefly 78violet), alongside her older sister Aly Michalka.

In addition to her music career, Michalka has appeared in films such as The Lovely Bones (2009), Secretariat (2010), Super 8 (2011), Grace Unplugged (2013), Weepah Way for Now (2015), and Support the Girls (2018). Michalka also starred in the ABC sitcom The Goldbergs (2013–2023) and its spin-off series Schooled (2019–2020), and she voiced a lead role as Catra in the Netflix animated adventure series She-Ra and the Princesses of Power (2018–2020).

== Early life ==
Michalka was born in Torrance, California, and is the younger sister of actress and musician Aly Michalka. Her father, Mark, owns a contracting company, and her mother, Carrie, is a musician and performed with the Christian rock band "JC Band". Her parents are divorced. As a little girl, she briefly lived in Seattle and Milwaukee. Both she and her sister attended Mack Elementary. She has played the piano since she was six and started playing the guitar in her early life. She started acting when she was five, mostly in church play productions. She was raised as a Christian and homeschooled for part of her childhood. Michalka was in a number of musical productions at her school in Milwaukee as a young woman. She plays a variety of instruments such as acoustic guitar, electric guitar, and piano.

== Career ==
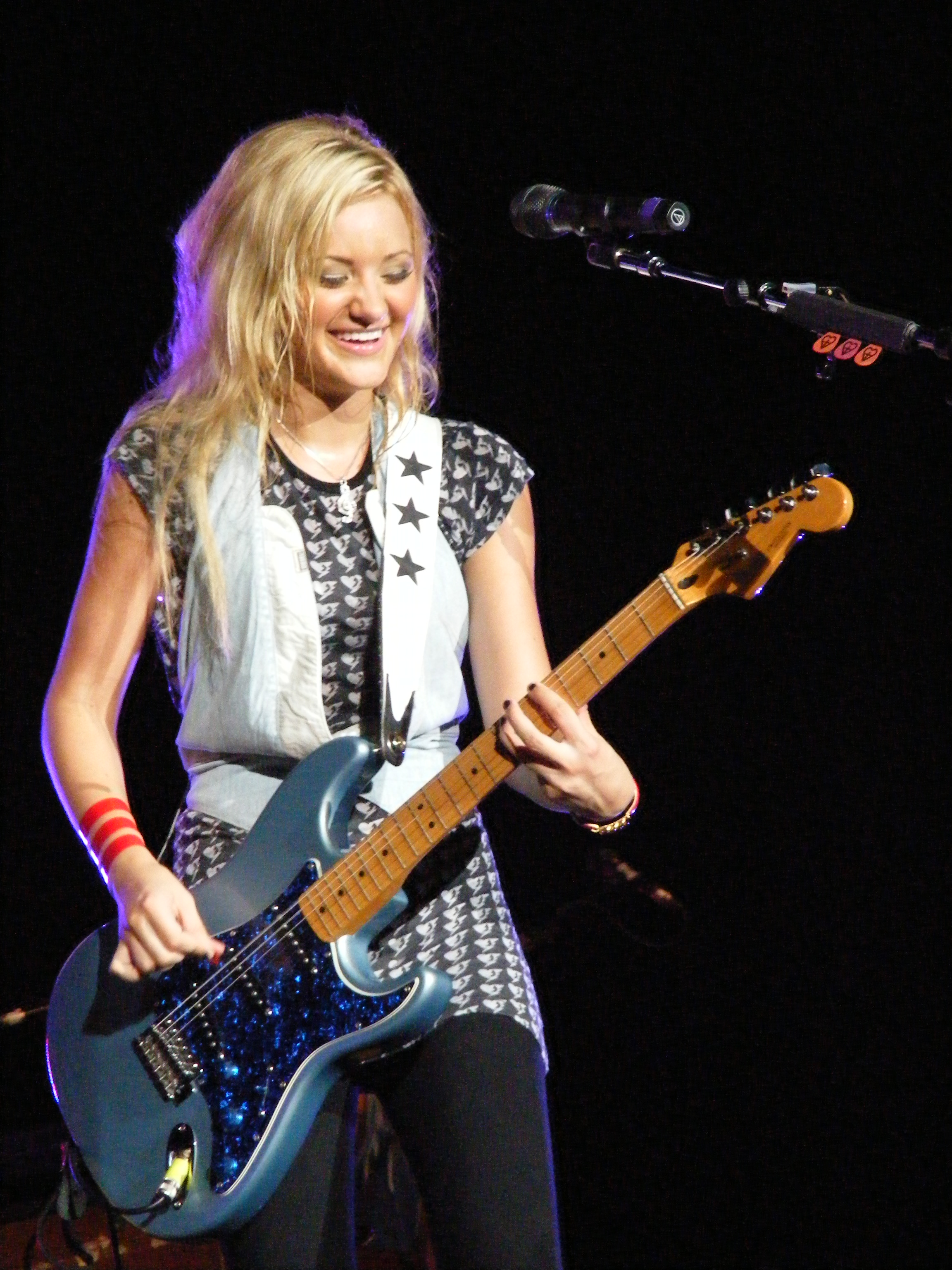
Michalka performing in 2007

Michalka started work in entertainment in the 2000s, when she was a model for catalogs. In 2006, she made her Disney Channel debut in the Disney Channel Original Movie Cow Belles, as "Courtney Callum", along with sister Aly, as "Taylor Callum". She has also appeared on shows such as Oliver Beene, Six Feet Under, The Guardian, and General Hospital. She and her sister appeared in the MTV film Super Sweet 16: The Movie.

In 2009, she was featured in the Peter Jackson film The Lovely Bones, released widely on January 15, 2010.

From 2009 to 2013, Michalka and her sister performed as the musical duo 78violet. They decided to change their band name back to "Aly and AJ" in 2015. She was cast as a recurring character on The CW series Hellcats starring Ashley Tisdale and her sister Aly Michalka. The series ran for one season and was cancelled in May 2011.

Michalka appeared in the 2011 film Super 8, directed by J. J. Abrams. Her first big-screen starring role was as the title character in 2013's Grace Unplugged.

Since 2013, Michalka has had a recurring role on the ABC sitcom The Goldbergs as Lainey Lewis, the best friend of main character Erica Goldberg and one-time girlfriend of Erica's brother, Barry. In May 2015, it was announced that she was promoted to series regular for the show's upcoming third season. She also played the Lainey character in a lead role on the spinoff series Schooled, which ran for two seasons.

In July 2014, she and her sister filmed an untitled drama in Laurel Canyon, California. The film was directed and written by Aly's husband, Stephen Ringer. Michalka was one of the producers of the film, with her sister and Ringer, and participated in the casting process. In May 2015, it was announced that the film, Weepah Way for Now, would premiere at the Los Angeles Film Festival on June 16, 2015. The film was released on DVD, iTunes, and other streaming platforms in June 2016.

Starting in 2015, Michalka voiced the character Stevonnie in Steven Universe, a fusion of the protagonist Steven and his best friend Connie.

In 2024, Michalka competed in season twelve of The Masked Singer as "Strawberry Shortcake", with Hayley Orrantia (who competed in season seven as "Ringmaster") serving as her Mask Ambassador. She was eliminated in the semi-finals and finished in third place. Michalka also made references to her nephew and Aly & AJ's upcoming album.

In December 2025, it was announced that Michalka was cast in season 4 of The White Lotus.

== Personal life ==
In 2006, Michalka dated actor and musician Joe Jonas. She has confirmed that her duo's song "Flattery" was written about him.

Since August 2017, Michalka has been in a relationship with actor Josh Pence.

== Filmography ==
=== Film ===
Year	Title	Role	Notes
2009	The Lovely Bones	Clarissa	
2010	Slow Moe	Emily	
2010	Secretariat	Kate Tweedy	
2011	Super 8	Jen Kaznyk	
2013	Grace Unplugged	Grace Trey	
2013	Angels in Stardust	Vallie Sue	
2015	Weepah Way for Now	Joy	Also producer
2016	Dirty Lies	Tiffany	
2017	Apple of My Eye	Kai	
2018	Support the Girls	Krista	

=== Television ===
Year	Title	Role	Notes
2002	Passions	Sheridan's Daughter	1 episode
2002	Birds of Prey	Young Dinah Lance	Episode: "Pilot"
2004	General Hospital	Ashley B.	2 episodes
2004	Six Feet Under	Ashley	2 episodes
2002–2004	The Guardian	Shannon Gressler	Recurring role (season 2–3)
2003–2004	Oliver Beene	Bonnie	Recurring role
2006	Cow Belles	Courtney Callum	Television film
2006	Haversham Hall	Hope Mason	Episode: "Pilot"
2007	Punk'd	Herself	1 episode
2007	Super Sweet 16: The Movie	Sara Connors	Television film
2007	Aly & AJ: Sister Act	Herself	Television special
2011	Hellcats	Deirdre Perkins	3 episodes
2011	Salem Falls	Gillian Duncan	Television film
2013–2023	The Goldbergs	Lainey Lewis	Recurring role (season 1–2, 5); main role (season 3–4, 6); guest (season 7–10)
2014	Silicon Valley	Charlotte	Episode: "Proof of Concept"
2014	Motive	Emily Williams	Episode: "Dead End"
2014	Expecting Amish	Hannah Yoder	Television film
2015–2019	Steven Universe	Stevonnie (voice)	Recurring role
2016	Cupcake Wars	Herself	Television special
2016	All My Friends Are Getting Married	Chloe	6 episodes
2018	Celebrity Family Feud	Herself	Episode: "Aly Michalka & AJ Michalka vs. Adrienne Houghton"
2018–2020	She-Ra and the Princesses of Power	Catra (voice)	Main role
2019–2020	Schooled	Lainey Lewis	Main role
2020	The Disney Family Singalong	Herself	Television special
2022	Ray Donovan: The Movie	Young Abby	Television film
2022	The Good Doctor	Nelly Dunn	Episode: "Yippee Ki-Yay"
2024	The Masked Singer	Herself	Main role (season 12)
TBA	The White Lotus	TBA	Main role (season 4)

=== Music videos ===
Year	Title	Artist(s)	Role	Ref.
2012	"Gotten"	Slash featuring Adam Levine	Joanna Martin	
2020	"Malibu" (At Home Edition)	Kim Petras	Herself	

== Discography ==
Soundtrack appearances
Year	Track	Album
2010	"It's Who You Are"	Secretariat
2013	"All I've Ever Needed"	Grace Unplugged
2013	"Desert Song"	Grace Unplugged
2013	"You Never Let Go"	Grace Unplugged
2013	"Misunderstood"	Grace Unplugged
2017	"Here Comes a Thought" (with Estelle)	Steven Universe, Vol. 1 (Original Soundtrack)
2017	"Tom Sawyer" (with Hayley Orrantia)	The Goldbergs Mixtape
2017	"Eternal Flame" (with Hayley Orrantia)	The Goldbergs Mixtape
2017	"Walking on Sunshine" (with Hayley Orrantia)	The Goldbergs Mixtape
2018	"We Deserve to Shine" (with Zach Callison, Grace Rolek, Estelle, Deedee Magno Hall, Michaela Dietz, Charlyne Yi and Erica Luttrell)	None
2019	"Escapism" (with Zach Callison and Grace Rolek)	Steven Universe, Vol. 2 (Original Soundtrack)
2020	"Warriors"	The Music of She-ra

== Awards and nominations ==
Year	Award	Category	Nominated work	Result
2006	American Music Awards	Contemporary Inspirational Artists of the Year	Into the Rush	Nominated
2014	Movieguide Awards	Most Inspiring Performance in Movies	Grace Unplugged	Won
2015	Napa Film Festival	Special Jury Award-Acting in a Lounge Feature Film (shared with Aly Michalka)	Weepah Way for Now	Won
2017	Behind the Voice Actor Awards	Best Female Vocal Performance in a Television Series in a Guest Role	Steven Universe	Won
