= Aly Michalka =

American actress and singer (born 1989)

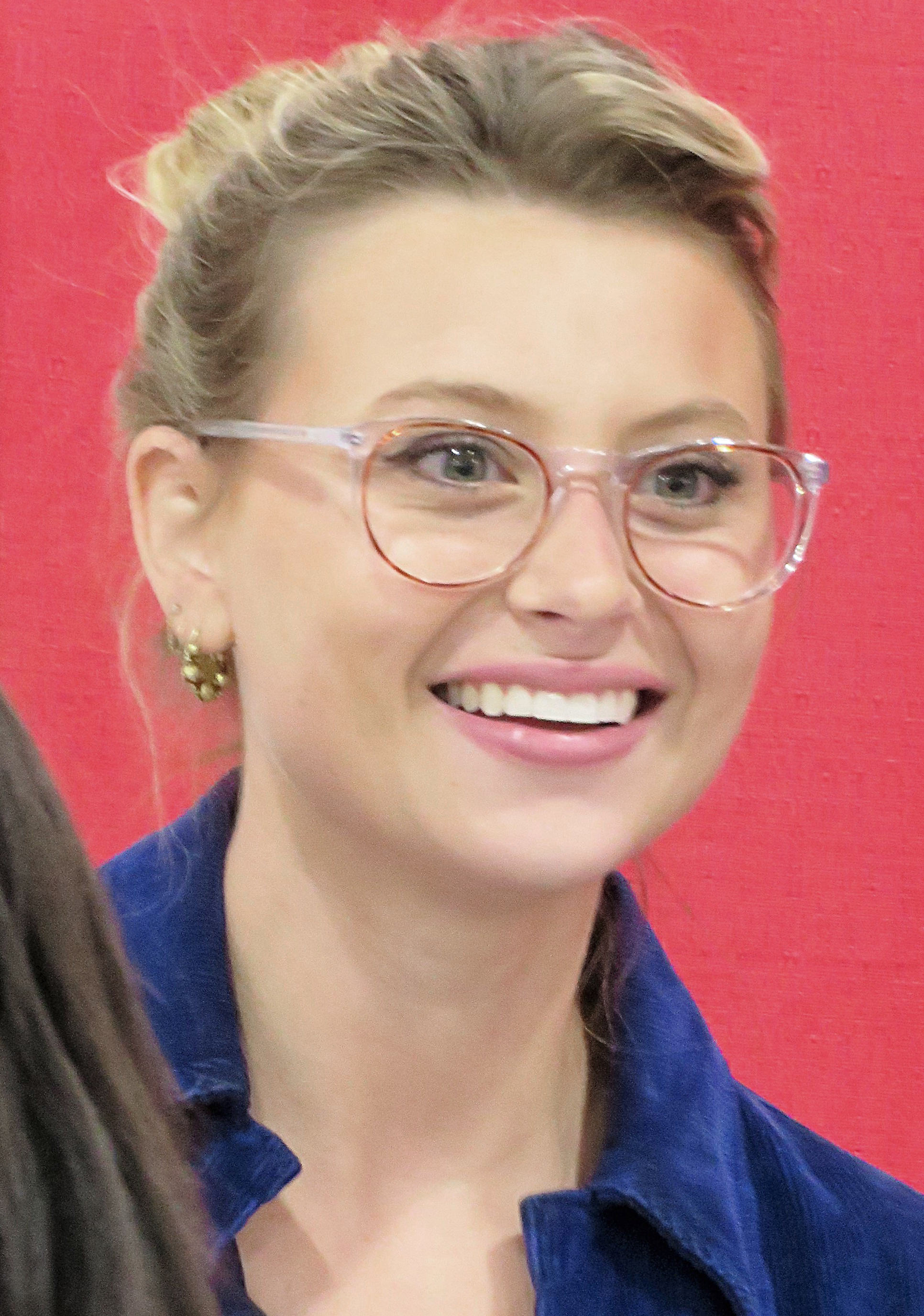
- Michalka in 2017
- Born: Alyson Renae Michalka; March 25, 1989 (age 37); Torrance, California, U.S.
- Occupations: Actress; singer; songwriter
- Years active: 2002–present
- Works: Discography; songs
- Spouse: Stephen Ringer (m. 2015)
- Children: 1
- Relatives: AJ Michalka (sister)
- Musical career
- Genre: Pop
- Labels: Hollywood; AWAL
- Member of: Aly & AJ

Alyson Renae Michalka (/miːˈʃɑːkə/ mee-SHAH-kə; born March 25, 1989) is an American actress, singer-songwriter, and musician. Michalka rose to prominence with her starring role as Keely Teslow in the Disney Channel sitcom Phil of the Future (2004–2006). She went on to appear in various films, such as Bandslam (2009), Easy A (2010), The Roommate (2011), Grown Ups 2 (2013), Sequoia (2014), Weepah Way for Now (2015), and The Lears (2017). She had starring roles in The CW comedy drama series Hellcats (2010–2011) and the CW crime drama series iZombie (2015–2019), along with the Hallmark Channel Original Movie, Sand Dollar Cove (2021).

Michalka is half of the musical duo Aly & AJ (briefly 78violet) alongside her sister, AJ.

== Early life ==
Michalka was born in Torrance, California, USA. She grew up in Seattle, Washington, and Southern California with her younger sister, Amanda Joy "AJ", who is also an actress and musician. Her father, Mark, owns a contracting company, and her mother, Carrie, is a musician who performed with the Christian rock band "JC Band". Her parents are divorced.

Michalka has played the piano since she was five and started playing the guitar at the age of 13. She started acting when she was five years old in church play productions her family attended outside Seattle, Washington and Thousand Oaks, California. She was raised as a Christian.

== Career ==
=== Acting ===
In 2004, Michalka was cast in the role of Keely Teslow on the Disney Channel's Phil of the Future. The series premiered on June 18, 2004. In August 2006, Disney Channel ended the series after two seasons. She has also starred in the Disney Channel original movie Now You See It..., and appeared in the TV movie Cow Belles opposite her sister. Michalka and her sister starred in several projects produced by the Disney Channel and MTV. In 2007, they appeared in the MTV film Super Sweet 16: The Movie based on the MTV series My Super Sweet 16. In August 2009, she co-starred in the Walden Media film Bandslam. In April 2010, The CW announced Michalka was cast in the main role of Marti Perkins on the cheerleading drama series Hellcats. Despite a successful premiere, ratings dropped, and in May 2011, The CW announced the show was not renewed for a second season. In 2011, Michalka made a guest appearance on CSI: NY. In 2010 and 2011 respectively, Michalka had major supporting roles in films Easy A and The Roommate. In 2013, Michalka appeared in the independent drama film, Crazy Kind of Love, alongside Eva Longoria, Virginia Madsen and Amanda Crew.

In 2013, Michalka participated in a multi-episode role on the sitcom Two and a Half Men. In July 2014, she and her sister filmed the independent drama Weepah Way for Now in Laurel Canyon, California; Michalka also participated in the casting process and production for the film. The movie was written and directed by her husband, Stephen Ringer, and premiered at the Los Angeles Film Festival on June 16, 2015. Michalka had a recurring role on the CW series iZombie for the first and second season, and became a regular cast member for season three. On April 19, 2016, she was announced as a cast member for the comedy film The Lears, an adaptation based on the Shakespearean play King Lear.

In November 2026, Michalka is set to make her Broadway debut as Anne Hathaway in & Juliet.

=== Music ===
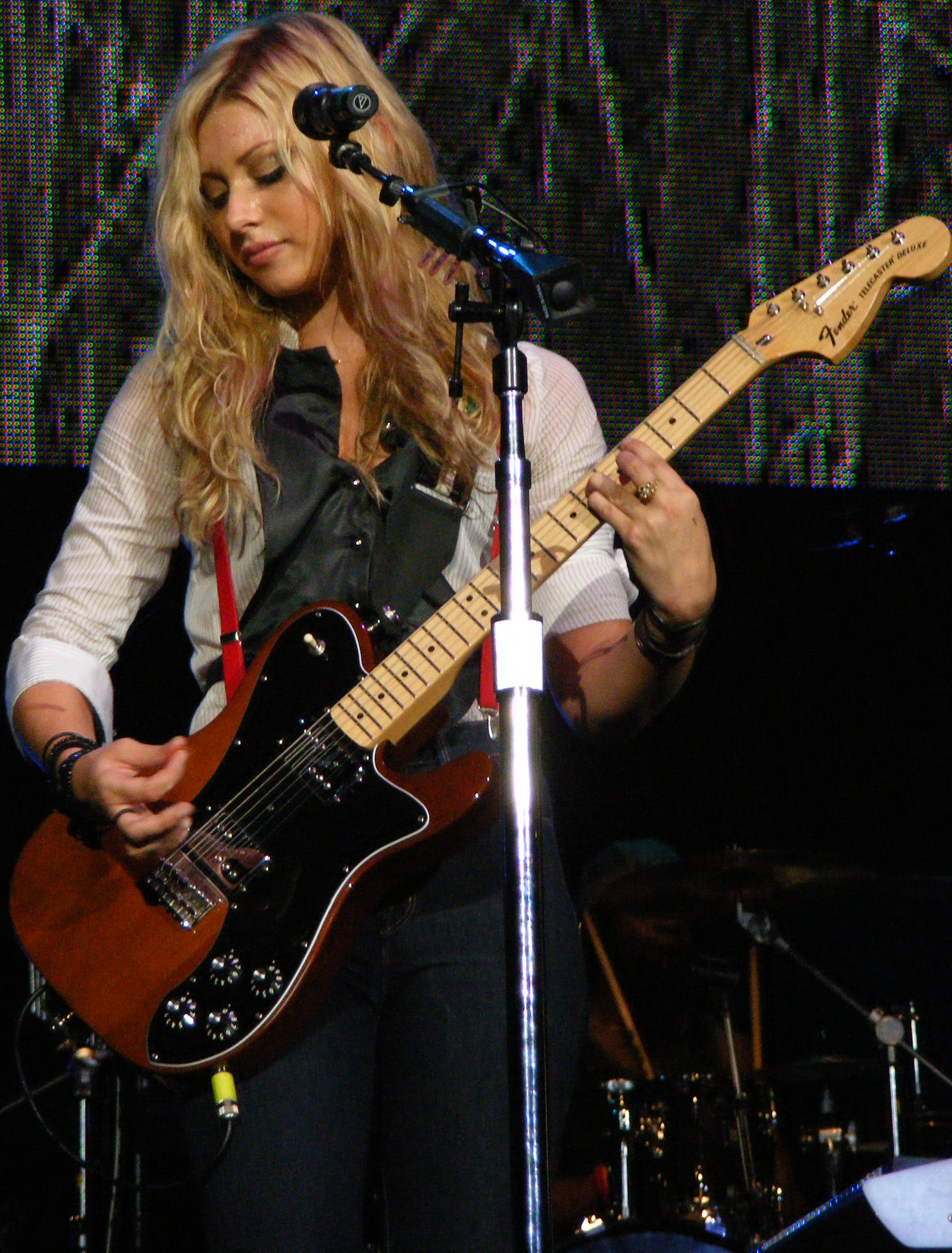
Michalka performing in 2007

Michalka and her sister AJ formed the musical duo Aly & AJ in 2004. They released their debut album, Into the Rush, on August 16, 2005, followed by the holiday album Acoustic Hearts of Winter in September 2006, which featured cover songs and two original songs. In July 2007, their third album, Insomniatic, was released, featuring the Billboard top 20 hit single, "Potential Breakup Song". The duo changed their name to 78violet and were set to release a fourth album in early 2010, but the project never materialized following their departure from Hollywood Records. Several years later, in the summer of 2013, they returned with new music, releasing their first single, "Hothouse", on July 8, 2013. In December 2015, they confirmed that they had returned to their original name, "Aly & AJ". In April 2016, they confirmed plans to release new music for an upcoming studio album. On June 2, 2017, they announced a new single, titled "Take Me". It served as the lead single from their EP, planned to be released on July 14, 2017. On May 7, 2021, they released A Touch of the Beat Gets You Up on Your Feet Gets You Out and Then Into the Sun.

== Personal life ==
In 2012, Michalka began dating independent film producer Stephen Ringer, whom she met on the set of Sequoia. The couple became engaged in Big Sur, California, in July 2014. They married in Portofino, Italy, on June 6, 2015. Michalka gave birth to their son on April 21, 2024.

== Filmography ==
=== Film ===
Year	Title	Role	Notes
2009	Bandslam	Charlotte Barnes	
2010	Easy A	Rhiannon Abernathy	
2011	The Roommate	Tracy Long	
2013	Crazy Kind of Love	Janine Bosh	
2013	Grown Ups 2	Bikini Girl Savannah	
2014	Sequoia	Reilly MacGrady	
2015	Weepah Way for Now	Elle	Also co-producer, production designer and costume designer
2017	The Lears	Regan Lear	
2021	Sand Dollar Cove	Elli	
TBA	Killing Winston Jones	Cookie Jones	

=== Television ===
Year	Title	Role	Notes
2004–2006	Phil of the Future	Keely Teslow	Main role; 43 episodes
2005	Now You See It...	Allyson Miller	Television film
2006	Cow Belles	Taylor Callum	Television film
2006	Haversham Hall	Hope Mason	Unaired television pilot
2007	Punk'd	Herself	Episode dated May 29, 2007
2007	Super Sweet 16: The Movie	Taylor Tiara	Television film
2007	Aly & AJ: Sister Act	Herself	Television special
2010–2011	Hellcats	Marti Perkins	Lead role; 22 episodes
2011	CSI: NY	Miranda Beck	Episode: "Keep It Real"
2012	Breaking In	Heather Young	Episode: "Heathers"
2013–2014	Two and a Half Men	Brooke	Recurring role; 5 episodes
2014	Anger Management	Lauren	Episode: "Charlie and Sean's Twisted Sister"
2015	Chevy	Molly	Unsold television pilot
2015–2019	iZombie	Peyton Charles	Main role; 56 episodes
2016	Cupcake Wars Celebrity	Herself / Contestant	Episode: "Cupcakes in Space"
2016	Motive	Chloe Wilson	Episode: "In Plain Sight"
2017, 2021	MacGyver	Frankie	2 episodes
2018	Hell's Kitchen	Herself	Episode: "Hell's Riders"
2018	Celebrity Family Feud	Herself	Episode: "Aly & AJ vs. Adrienne Houghton"
2022	The Good Doctor	Lexi Dunn	Episode: "Yippee Ki-Yay"

=== Theater ===
Year	Title	Role	Venue	Notes
2026	& Juliet	Anne Hathaway	Stephen Sondheim Theatre	Broadway debut

=== Web ===
Year	Title	Role	Notes
2017–2019	Ryan Hansen Solves Crimes on Television	Amy	Main role; 14 episodes

== Discography ==
Soundtrack appearances
Year	Track	Album
2009	"Amphetamine"	Bandslam
2009	"I Want You to Want Me"	Bandslam
2009	"Someone to Fall Back On"	Bandslam
2010	"Brand New Day"	Hellcats (Music from the Television Series)
2010	"Belong Here"	Hellcats (Music from the Television Series)

== Awards and nominations ==
Year	Award	Category	Work	Result	Refs
2005	Young Artist Awards	Best Performance in a TV Series (Comedy or Drama) – Leading Young Actress	Phil of the Future	Nominated	
2006	American Music Awards	Contemporary Inspirational Artists of the Year	Into the Rush	Nominated	
2011	Teen Choice Awards	Choice Female Scene Stealer	Easy A & The Roommate	Nominated	
2015	Napa Film Festival	Special Jury Award: Acting in a Lounge Feature Film	Weepah Way for Now	Won	
