= Jordan Pruitt discography =

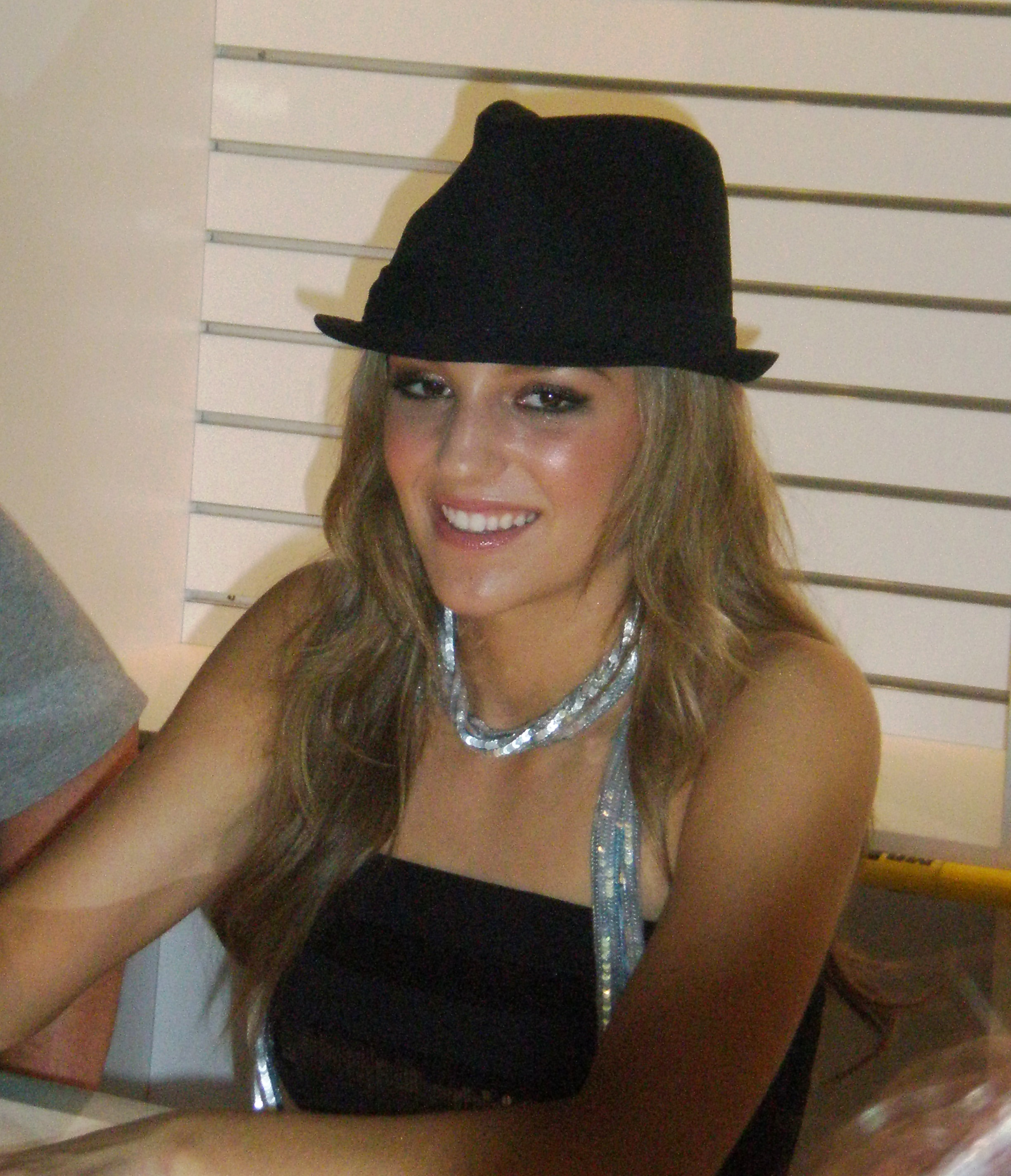
- Pruitt in 2008
- Studio albums: 2
- Singles: 5
- Video albums: 1
- Tours: 7

The following is a discography for American singer Jordan Pruitt.

== Studio albums ==
Album Information
No Ordinary Girl
- Released: February 6, 2007 (U.S.)
- Label: Hollywood Records
- U.S. Billboard 200: 64
- Official Singles:
  - 2006: "Outside Looking In"
  - 2006: "We Are Family"
  - 2007: "Jump to the Rhythm"
  - 2007: "Teenager"
Permission to Fly
- Released: July 22, 2008 (U.S)
- Label: Hollywood Records
- U.S. Billboard 200:-
- Official Singles
  - 2008: "One Love"
  - 2008: "My Shoes"

== Singles ==
Year	Single	Chart positions		Album
Year	Single	U.S. Hot	U.S. Pop	Album
2006	"Outside Looking In"	77	62	No Ordinary Girl
2006	"We Are Family"	—	—	No Ordinary Girl
2006	"Jump to the Rhythm"	54	45	No Ordinary Girl
2006	"Teenager"	—	—	No Ordinary Girl
2008	"One Love"	—	—	Permission to Fly
2008	"My Shoes"	—	—	Permission to Fly
2011	"Hey Shy Boy"	—	—	Non-album singles
2011	"Something's Gotta Give"	—	—	Non-album singles
2013	"The One That Got Away"	—	—	Non-album singles
2013	"Troublemaker" (Max featuring Jordan Pruitt)	—	—	Non-album singles
2016	"Merry Christmas Baby"	—	—	Non-album singles

=== Soundtracks ===
- 2006: "Santa Don't Stop" – (from Totally Awesome Christmas Vol. 1)
- 2007: "When She Loved Me" – (from Disneymania 5)
- 2007: "Celebrate Love " – (from A Disney Channel Holiday, All Wrapped Up)
- 2008: "Ever Ever After" – (from Disneymania 6, originally sung by Carrie Underwood for the movie Enchanted)
- 2009: "Take To The Sky" – (from Tinker Bell and the Lost Treasure)
- 2009: "This Christmas" – (from All Wrapped Up Vol. 2)

=== Concert tours ===
- 2006: The Party's Just Begun Tour (opened for The Cheetah Girls in the first 40 cities)
- 2006–2007: High School Musical: The Concert (opened for the concert High School Musical)
- 2007: Six Flags-State Fair Tour (opened for The Jonas Brothers)
- 2007: State Fair Tour (opened for Drake Bell and Corbin Bleu)
- 2007: Simon D Mall Tour
- 2007: Family Channel Spring Break Kickin' It
- 2007: The Plain White Tees
- 2007: Corbin Bleu and Vanessa Hudgens
- 2008: The Tour of Gymnastics Superstars (co-headlined with KSM and Carly Patterson)
- 2008: Canada's Wonderland
- 2008–2009: Raven-Symoné Live Tour! (opening act)
- 2009: Demi Lovato Summer Tour 2009 (opening act)
- 2013: Max Schneider and Jordan Pruitt Summer Tour (co-headlined with Max Schneider)

== DVDs ==
- 2007: No Ordinary Girl (Jordan Pruitt Music Videos)
- 2007: Air Buddies
- 2007: High School Musical: The Concert- Extreme Access Pass
- 2009: Radio Disney Jams 11
