= Gold Over America Tour =

Gold Over America Tour may refer to:

- 2021 Gold Over America Tour, gymnastics-themed touring show headlined by Simone Biles
- 2024 Gold Over America Tour, the second gymnastics-themed touring show headlined by Simone Biles
