= Take Two =

Take Two or Take 2 may refer to:

== Media ==
- Take-Two Interactive, a video game publisher
- Take Two (The Price Is Right), a segment game on the American TV game show The Price is Right
- The Princess Diaries: Take Two, a book by Meg Cabot
- "Take Two", a 2008 upgrade to the Apple TV digital media receiver
- Take Two (novel), a novel by Julia DeVillers and Jennifer Roy

=== Film and television ===
- Take Two, a 1988 film starring Frank Stallone
- Take 2 (film), a 2017 film directed by Ivan Ho
- Take Two (TV series), a 2018 American television series
- Take 2, a defunct sister channel to HBO

=== Music ===
- Take Two (Marvin Gaye and Kim Weston album), 1966
- Take Two (Robson & Jerome album), 1996
- Take Two, an EP by Brad Corrigan (Braddigan)
- Take Two, 2001 compilation album by New Riders of the Purple Sage and Poco
- Take Two, a 2010 album by Sezairi Sezali
- Terri Clark: Take Two, a 2024 album by Terri Clark
- "Take Two" (song), a 2023 song by BTS

== Other ==
- Take Two, a variant of the board game Scrabble
- Take 2: The Student's Point of View, an educational organization founded by Karin Muller

== See also ==
- It Takes Two (disambiguation)
- Take (disambiguation)
- Take One (disambiguation)
