= Chad Broskey =

American actor

- Born: July 3, 1987 (age 39); Louisville, Kentucky, U.S.
- Occupation: Actor
- Years active: 2005–2009; 2016

Chad Broskey (born July 3, 1987) is an American actor. He has played in two movies, Legally Blondes (2009), and Read It and Weep (2006).

== Early life ==
Chad went to the Youth Performing Arts School in Louisville, Kentucky.

== Career ==
He appeared as Gavin in an episode for The Suite Life of Zack & Cody. He also co-starred in the Disney Channel Original Movie Read It and Weep opposite Kay Panabaker as Marco Vega and appeared in the Scrubs episode Their Story as The Todd's fantasy son Rod. Chad appeared in an episode of Wizards of Waverly Place as one of the football players that helps Justin take down The Answer Man. His last movie was Legally Blondes.

== Personal life ==
Broskey is openly gay.

== Filmography ==
| Year | Film | Role | Other notes |
|---|---|---|---|
| 2006 | Read It and Weep | Marco Vega | Disney Channel Original Movie |
| 2009 | Legally Blondes | Justin Whitley | direct-to-video |
| Year | Television appearance | Role | Other notes |
| 2005 | The Suite Life of Zack & Cody | Gavin | "Big Hair & Baseball" |
| 2007 | Scrubs | Rod | "Their Story" |
| 2007 | Wizards of Waverly Place | Brian | "New Employee" |
| 2016 | Nashville | Bryan | "Didn't Expect It to Go Down This Way" |
