= Princess of Gossip =

Book by Sabrina Bryan and Julia DeVillers

- Author: Sabrina Bryan, Julia DeVillers
- Cover artist: Laywan Kwan
- Language: English
- Genre: Young Adult
- Publisher: MTV, Simon and Schuster
- Publication date: October 8, 2008
- Publication place: United States
- Media type: Print (Paperback)
- Pages: 384
- ISBN: 1-4165-7065-9
- OCLC: 209701117
- LC Class: PZ7.B8295 Pr 2008

Princess of Gossip is a young adult novel by Sabrina Bryan (The Cheetah Girls, Dancing with the Stars) and Julia DeVillers (How My Private, Personal Journal Became A Bestseller). The book, published by MTV/Simon & Schuster was released on October 7 and sold out on Amazon.com on the first day.

== Plot ==
Princess of Gossip tells the story of Avery Johnson, a fourteen-year-old high school freshman who just moved from Ohio to Southern California. While on MySpace, she is mistaken as a rising pop star's assistant. She scores an invite to a Hollywood Party and snaps a photo of a young starlet and her secret new beau. Finding this information too juicy to keep to herself, she starts a blog, the Princess of Gossip, and posts the story.

Overnight, she becomes the newest go-to girl for gossip. Designers are sending her priceless dresses, and she's getting the inside scoop on all things celebrity. When Avery shows up at school in her exclusive fashion swag, even Cecilia, the most popular girl in their class, takes notice. She begins to get jealous.

Then celebutante playboy Beckett Howard sees Avery wearing one of his father's designs and asks her out. The Princess of Gossip's true identity is still a secret, but when the paparazzi catch Avery and Beckett on a date, Cecilia gets even more jealous. There's only room for only one it girl at school. Can the Princess of Gossip hold onto her crown?

== Official Site ==
The official website, PrincessOfGossip.Ning.com, launched on September 8, 2008. Built on the Ning platform, the site is also a social network which allows users to create their own page and interact with other users. Perhaps the most innovative feature of the website is the character profiles. Visitors can interact with 8 characters from the book and the two co-authors through their own personal pages, the site chat room and through each character's blog entry. Each character has their own online "life" complete with Facebook, MySpace, and Twitter accounts.
