= Acoustic Hearts of Winter =

Studio album by Aly & AJ
- Released: September 26, 2006
- Recorded: Summer 2006
- Studio: Conway Studios (Hollywood, California): Rock Mafia Studios (Santa Monica, California)
- Genre: Christmas; folk-pop; pop rock
- Length: 29:40
- Label: Hollywood
- Producer: Antonina Armato; Gerry Cagle (exec.); Tim James; Carrie Michalka (exec.)

Aly & AJ chronology
Into the Rush (2005)	Acoustic Hearts of Winter (2006)	Insomniatic (2007)

Singles from Acoustic Hearts of Winter
- 1. "Greatest Time of Year" Released: November 21, 2006

Acoustic Hearts of Winter is a Christmas album and the second studio album by American pop duo Aly & AJ. The album was released on September 26, 2006, in the United States, via Hollywood Records. The album was conceived as a project after completing the deluxe edition of their debut album, Into the Rush (2005). All production of the album was done by Antonina Armato and Tim James. The majority of songs are cover versions of religious Christmas carols or contemporary classics. Two originals appear on the set, which were written by Aly & AJ with Armato and James. Musically, the album has an instrument-driven acoustic feel, primarily by guitar. It utilizes pop music influences on Christmas music. The album sold 110,000 copies in the United States.

The album received generally positive reviews, with critics complimenting the lyrical content of the original songs and the overall sound. Acoustic Hearts of Winter debuted on the US Billboard 200 at 78, and peaked on the Top Holiday Albums chart at 14. It was the second best-selling holiday album of 2006. The sole single from the album, "Greatest Time of Year", used to promote The Santa Clause 3: The Escape Clause, peaked at 96 on the Billboard Hot 100. Aly & AJ promoted the album mainly on CD USA and at the 2006 Walt Disney World Christmas Day Parade. In 2007, the album was re-released with three new traditional cover songs.

== Background ==
During the summer of 2006, after wrapping up the production and recording of their debut album, Into the Rush, Aly & AJ began recording their first Christmas album. Antonina Armato and Tim James who worked on the duo's debut album and several other Disney-related acts, were recruited to executive produce the effort. They anticipated finishing the album by the end of the summer, in order for it to be released for the holiday season. Aly & AJ thought it ironic that they were prepping a Christmas album during the hottest days of the year. Alyson Michalka told the Saginaw News that producers Armato and James filled the studio with Christmas decorations, Christmas cookies, and a tree with gifts to open after they were done, in order for them to get in the Christmas spirit.

== Composition ==
"Joy to the World"
A sample of "Joy to the World", a part of the album's traditional Christmas carols, utilizing several instruments and having an acoustic feel.

Acoustic Hearts of Winter is musically based on Christmas music with pop, pop rock and teen pop inclinations. All songs were produced by Antonina Armato and Tim James. Aly & AJ, along with executive producers Armato and James, adapted and arranged most of the cover songs on the album. Many of the songs incorporate heavy instrumentation, such as guitar, cello, percussion, bass, and piano. The album is mainly composed of cover versions of Christmas carols and contemporary holiday classics, while two original numbers are included. "Joy to the World", "We Three Kings", "The First Noel", "God Rest Ye Merry Gentlemen", and "Silent Night" are religious traditional carols. Also included are the traditional "Deck the Halls", as well as "I'll Be Home for Christmas", "The Little Drummer Boy", originally performed by Harry Simeone and "Let It Snow", notably performed by Vaughan Monroe.

The album's opening number "Greatest Time of Year", the first of the album's two originals, was written by Aly & AJ, Armato, and James. The second original and closing track, "Not This Year" is a reflection about past Christmases, and how the current is different. According to the duo, the song is dedicated to their grandmother Carmen, who died on Christmas Eve a few years previous. On the 2007 edition of the album exclusively available at retailer Target, the traditionals "We Wish You a Merry Christmas" and "Winter Wonderland" were bonus tracks, as well as "Rockin' Around the Christmas Tree", originally performed by Brenda Lee.

== Reception ==
=== Critical reception ===
Professional ratings
Review scores
Source	Rating
Allmusic	3/5 stars
Jesus Freak Hideout	3.5/5 stars
Tampa Bay Times	C+

Matt Collar of Allmusic complimented the classic Christmas songs composed in a "light, contemporary pop fashion," noting Aly & AJ's original songs as standouts on the album. Logan Leasure of Jesus Freak Hideout commended Aly & AJ's "powerhouse" vocals on the tracks, but said carols such as "The First Noel" and "Deck the Halls" were a bit boring, due to the acoustic feel of the set. Overall, Leasure said "This album has its good share of standout tracks that are sure to satisfy any fan of modern Christmas music." He specifically pointed out "Little Drummer Boy" and the impressive lyrical content of "Not This Year. Tampa Bay Times critic Sean Daly praised the duo's original songs, on which they "ditch the wispy routine". On the other hand, he viewed the rest of the album as "flat and forgettable".

=== Chart performance ===
On the chart dated November 25, 2006, nearly two months after initial release, Acoustic Hearts of Winter debuted at number 114 on the Billboard 200. The album rose to its peak position of 78 the following week. It remained inside the top half of the chart for three weeks, and maintained a position inside the top 200 albums for seven weeks. On the Billboard Top Holiday Albums chart, on the chart issued November 25, 2006, the album debuted at number 20. A week later, it moved up to number 14, where it peaked, and spent 14 weeks on the chart. Acoustic Hearts of Winter was the second best-selling Holiday album of the 2006 holiday season. During the 2007 and 2008 holiday seasons, the album re-entered the Holiday Albums chart at 45 and 28, respectively. The album had sold 110,000 copies in the United States to date.

== Promotion ==
"Greatest Time of Year"
"Greatest Time of Year", a contemporary Christmas song utilizing pop rock and teen pop elements, was used to promote The Santa Clause 3 and peaked at ninety-six on the Hot 100.

"Greatest Time of Year" was used to promote the Disney-affiliated film, The Santa Clause 3: The Escape Clause. On November 21, 2006, it was released as a single on the iTunes Store in conjunction with Radio Disney, as the song was packaged with an interview with the duo on the station. The song first appeared on the Billboard Bubbling Under Hot 100 chart on the December 2, 2006 issue. Propelled by its debut at number 67 on the Hot Digital Songs chart, "Greatest Time of Year" debuted at number 96 on the Billboard Hot 100. Additionally, it peaked at number 72 on the Pop 100. Two music videos were developed for the song, one that is intercut with scenes from the film, and a second, which solely features the sisters.

The duo performed the "Greatest Time of Year" live on CD USA. Additionally they performed it at the 2006 Walt Disney World Christmas Day Parade, and in 2007 on tour as an opening act for Miley Cyrus on The Best of Both Worlds Tour. Also in 2007, the album was re-released as a deluxe edition by Target, and included covers of the traditional Christmas song "We Wish You a Merry Christmas" as well as "Winter Wonderland" and "Rockin' Around the Christmas Tree." Variations of "Greatest Time of Year" are also included on the Walt Disney Records compilation albums Disney Channel Holiday (2007), and All Wrapped Up (2008).

== Track listing ==
No.	Title	Writer(s)	Length
1.	"Greatest Time of Year"	Aly Michalka; AJ Michalka; Antonina Armato; Tim James	3:41
2.	"Joy to the World"	George Frideric Handel; Lowell Mason; Isaac Watts^{[a]}	2:52
3.	"We Three Kings"	John Henry Hopkins Jr.^{[a]}	2:54
4.	"The First Noel"	Traditional	1:44
5.	"God Rest Ye Merry Gentlemen"	Traditional	2:33
6.	"Silent Night"	Joseph Mohr; Franz X. Gruber^{[a]}	3:05
7.	"I'll Be Home for Christmas"	Kim Gannon; Walter Kent; Buck Ram	2:44
8.	"Let It Snow"	Jule Styne; Sammy Cahn	2:08
9.	"Deck the Halls"	Traditional	1:54
10.	"Little Drummer Boy"	Katherine Davis; Henry Onorati; Harry Simeone	2:37
11.	"Not This Year"	Michalka; Michalka; Armato; James	3:24
Total length:			29:46

Target bonus tracks
No.	Title	Writer(s)	Length
12.	"We Wish You a Merry Christmas"	Traditional	1:22
13.	"Winter Wonderland"	Richard B. Smith	2:43
14.	"Rockin' Around the Christmas Tree"	Johnny Marks	2:05
Total length:			35:56

- ^{^[a]} writer credited as Traditional

== Personnel ==
Credits adapted from the album's liner notes.

- Aly Michalka – vocals
- AJ Michalka – vocals
- Jamie Muhoberac – keyboards (1, 11), acoustic piano (2–9), Wurlitzer electric piano (2–9)
- Tim Pierce – guitars
- Dean Parks – guitars (2–9)
- Sean Hurley – bass
- Dorian Crozier – drums (1, 10, 11)
- Luis Conte – percussion (2–9)
- Bob Zimmitti – vibraphone (8)
- Cameron Stone – cello (3–6)

=== Production ===
- Carrie Michalka – executive production
- Gerry Cagle – executive production
- Jon Lind – A&R
- Antonina Armato – producer
- Tim James – producer, mixing
- Paul Palmer – mixing
- Ross Hogarth – engineer
- Nigel Lundemo – engineer
- Stephen Marcussen – mastering at Marcussen Mastering (Hollywood, California)
- Christi Parker – A&R coordinator
- David Snow – creative director
- Aly Michalka – butterfly logo trademark design
- Keith Munyon – photography

== Charts ==
Chart	Peak position
US Billboard 200	78
US Top Holiday Albums (Billboard)	14
