= Kay Panabaker =

American actress (born 1990)

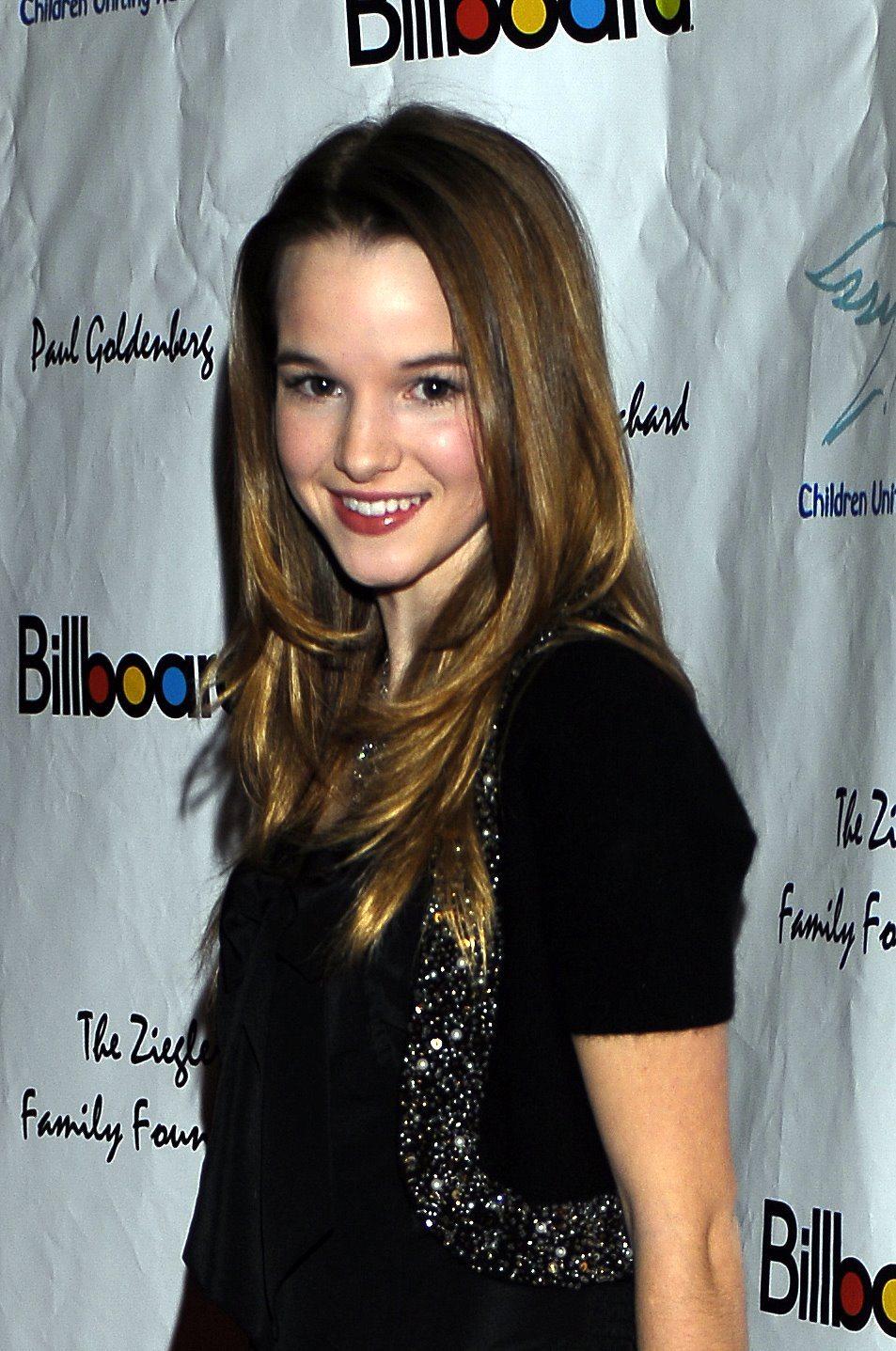
- Panabaker in 2007
- Born: Stephanie Kay Panabaker; May 2, 1990 (age 36); Orange, Texas, U.S.
- Education: Glendale Community College (AA); University of California, Los Angeles (BA)
- Occupation: Actress
- Years active: 2000–2012
- Relatives: Danielle Panabaker (sister)

Stephanie Kay Panabaker (born May 2, 1990) is an American former actress. She is best known for her work with the Disney Channel, starring in popular productions like Phil of the Future (2004–2006) and Read It and Weep (2006), and her role on the teen drama Summerland (2004–2005).

== Early life ==
Stephanie Kay Panabaker was born on May 2, 1990, in Orange County, Texas, to Donna (née Mayock) and Harold Panabaker, III. As children, she and her older sister, Danielle Panabaker, started acting at various community theatres in Chicago, Philadelphia, and Atlanta. Their family relocated to Los Angeles so the sisters could further their acting careers.

Panabaker graduated from high school, in 2003, at 13 years old and was valedictorian. She graduated from Glendale Community College with an associate degree when she was 15 and from University of California, Los Angeles (UCLA) with a Bachelor of Arts in history when she was 17.

== Career ==
Panabaker began her film and TV career in the early 2000s, with guest roles in popular shows like 7th Heaven, ER, and Angel, and small parts in theatrical releases like Monsters, Inc. and Dead Heat.

As a teenager, Panabaker and her sister found regular work as actors on the Disney Channel. In 2004, she appeared as Debbie Berwick, a friendly cyborg, on Phil of the Future. Her character was written out of the show after the first season. After that, she went onto star in two Disney Channel original films, Life is Ruff (2005) and Read It and Weep (2006), the latter in which she acted opposite Danielle. In 2006, Panabaker appeared in the Disney Channel Games, on the same team as Zac Efron, Anneliese van der Pol, Moises Arias, Dylan Sprouse, and Shin Koyamada. Her final appearance on the Disney Channel came in 2007, with a guest appearance as Amber on The Suite Life of Zack & Cody.

From 2004 to 2005, Panabaker starred as Nikki Westerly, a teen girl who moves to the fictional Californian town of Playa Linda to live with her aunt, portrayed by Lori Loughlin, after the death of her parents, on the WB drama Summerland. Panabaker acted alongside fellow teen idols Zac Efron, who played her love interest, and Jesse McCartney, who played her brother. The series ran for two seasons. In a 2016 interview with Naperville Magazine, Panabaker said working on the show wasn't a good experience, and that producers asked her to lose weight, despite her not even weighing 100 lbs at the time.

Panabaker remained in Los Angeles and continued to act for several years after the conclusion of Summerland, but said her passion for acting never returned. After Summerland, she continued to make one-time appearances in popular TV shows like Grey's Anatomy, Law & Order: Special Victims Unit, and Ghost Whisperer, and returned to theatrical films, starring in Fame, the 1980 teen musical drama of the same name, in 2009, and in Little Birds, which was nominated for the Grand Jury Prize at the Sundance Film Festival, in 2011.

In 2010, Panabaker joined the main cast of the sci-fi drama series No Ordinary Family, playing Daphne, a 16-year-old who becomes telepathic after surviving a plane crash. While the show's early episodes were positively received by audiences and critics, later episodes, which saw Daphne and her family take on more traditional action hero roles and focused less on their family dynamic, weren't as well-received and ABC decided not to renew the show for a second season.

Her final acting role was as Rosa in Beverly Hills Chihuahua 3: Viva la Fiesta! (2012).

== Personal life ==
Since 2016, Panabaker has been a zookeeper for Disney's Animal Kingdom at Walt Disney World in Bay Lake, Florida.

== Filmography ==
=== Film ===
Year	Title	Role	Notes
2001	Monsters, Inc.	Garbage Monster	Voice role
2002	Temptation	Jamie Savini	Short film
2002	Dead Heat	Samantha LaRoche	
2007	Moondance Alexander	Moondance Alexander	
2007	Nancy Drew	George Fayne	
2007	A Modern Twain Story: The Prince and the Pauper	Elizabeth	
2009	Fame	Jenny Garrison	
2010	The Lake Effect	Celia	
2011	Little Birds	Allison	
2012	Beverly Hills Chihuahua 3: Viva la Fiesta!	Rosa	Voice role and final film role

=== Television ===
Year	Title	Role	Notes
2002	The Jamie Kennedy Experiment	Kelly	2 episodes
2002	Port Charles	Sara	1 episode
2002	ER	Melissa Rue	Episode: "The Letter"
2002	7th Heaven	Alice Brand	Episode: "Regarding Eric"
2002–2003	Angel	Mesektet (The Girl)	2 episodes
2003	The Division	Susie Jenkins	Episode: "Cold Comfort"
2003	The Brothers García	Carrie Bauer	Episode: "Moving On Up"
2004–2005	Summerland	Nikki Westerly	Main role
2004–2005	Phil of the Future	Debbie Berwick	13 episodes
2005	Mom at Sixteen	Young Macy (uncredited)	Television film
2005	Medium	Elisha	Episode: "Penny for Your Thoughts"
2005	Life Is Ruff	Emily Watson	Disney Channel original television film
2006	American Dragon: Jake Long	Cheerleader Lacey	Voice, episode: "Bring It On"
2006	Disney Channel Games	Herself / Contestant	Part of Red Team
2006	Read It and Weep	Jamie Bartlett	Television film
2006–2011	CSI: Crime Scene Investigation	Lindsey Willows	6 episodes
2007	The Winner	Vivica	Episode: "Single Dates"
2007	Two and a Half Men	Sophie	Episode: "Tucked, Taped and Gorgeous"
2007	The Suite Life of Zack & Cody	Amber	Episode: "First Day of High School"
2007	Custody	Amanda Gordon	Television film
2007	Weeds	Amelia	Episode: "He Taught Me How to Drive By"
2007	Boston Legal	Abby Holt	Episode: "The Chicken and the Leg"
2007	Ghost Whisperer	Marlo Sinclair	Episode: "Bad Blood"
2008	Grey's Anatomy	Emma Anderson	Episode: "All by Myself"
2009	Happy Campers	Dylan	Television film
2009	A Marriage	Maddy Gabriel	Television film
2009	Lie to Me	Emily Lightman (scenes deleted)	Episode: "Pilot"
2009	Mental	Aysnley Skoff	Episode: "Manic at the Disco"
2010	Brothers & Sisters	Young Kitty Walker	Episode: "Time After Time"
2010	Secrets in the Walls	Lizzie	Television film
2010–2011	No Ordinary Family	Daphne Nicole Powell	Main role
2011	Cyberbully	Samantha Caldone	Television film
2011	Law & Order: Special Victims Unit	Vicki Harris	Episode: "Spiraling Down"; final TV role

=== Music video ===
Year	Artist	Song	Notes
2006	Jordan Pruitt	"Outside Looking In"	From No Ordinary Girl and Read It and Weep (single to promote the movie)

== Awards and honors ==
Panabaker previously held a Seat on the National Board of the Coalition for Quality Children's Media. As of 2020 this was no longer the case.

Year	Association	Category	Nominated work	Result	Ref.
2003	Young Artist Awards	Best Performance in a TV Drama Series – Guest Starring Young Actress	ER (episode: "The Letter")	Nominated	
2004	Young Artist Awards	Best Performance in a Commercial	Youth Anti-Smoking PSA	Nominated	
2005	Young Artist Awards	Best Performance in a Television Series – Recurring Young Actress	Phil of the Future	Nominated	
2005	Young Artist Awards	Best Performance in a TV Series (Comedy or Drama) – Leading Young Actress	Summerland	Won	
2007	Temecula Valley International Film Festival	Rising Star Award		Won	
2008	Young Artist Awards	Best Performance in a Feature Film – Leading Young Actress	Moondance Alexander	Nominated	
2008	Young Artist Awards	Best Performance in a Feature Film – Young Ensemble Cast	Nancy Drew (shared with rest of cast)	Nominated	
