= Outside Looking In (song) =

Single by Jordan Pruitt

from the album No Ordinary Girl
- Released: June 2006
- Recorded: 2006
- Length: 2:54
- Label: Hollywood
- Songwriter(s): Jordan Pruitt, Keith Thomas, Robin Scoffield

Jordan Pruitt singles chronology
"Outside Looking In" (2006)	"We Are Family" (2006)

"Outside Looking In" is the debut single by American singer Jordan Pruitt. It was recorded for the Disney Channel Original Movie Read It and Weep in 2006. While there was no soundtrack album for the film, the song released as a single to promote it. The song is also included on Pruitt's debut album No Ordinary Girl.

The song debuted (and ultimately peaked) at number 77 on the Billboard Hot 100 in mid-February 2007, the highest debut of that week. Although it was Pruitt's first single to be released, it was her second single to chart on the Billboard Hot 100, the first being "Jump to the Rhythm".

== Music video ==
The video begins with kids and teachers getting ready to take the class picture together. They also take pictures individually. It shows clips in between of people being left out of the crowd and Pruitt singing. It also shows Kay Panabaker, the star of Read It and Weep, not smiling at pictures and a groups of kids staring at her sitting at a desk. At the end, all the kids get invited to be in the group. The last scene is them taking the class photo.

== Versions & Covers ==
In early 2007, Pruitt released a Spanish version called "Siempre desde afuera". This song was also covered by Amanda Todd on YouTube before her death. The video came to Pruitt's attention, whereupon she uploaded a tribute video to Todd on her YouTube account.

== Chart performance ==
The song debuted on the Billboard Hot 100 chart of February 24, 2007, at number 77.

== Charts ==
Chart (2007)	Peak position
U.S. Billboard Hot 100	77
U.S. Billboard Pop 100	62
