= Greatest Time of Year =

Single by Aly & AJ

from the album Acoustic Hearts of Winter
- Released: November 21, 2006
- Recorded: 2006
- Genre: Christmas rock
- Length: 3:13 (single); 3:39 (album); 2:19 (All Wrapped Up)
- Label: Hollywood
- Songwriters: Alyson Michalka; Amanda Michalka; Antonina Armato; Tim James
- Producers: Armato; James

Aly & AJ singles chronology
| "Chemicals React" (2006) | "Greatest Time of Year" (2006) | "Potential Breakup Song" (2007) |

"Greatest Time of Year" is a song from Aly & AJ's Christmas album Acoustic Hearts of Winter. The single was used for The Santa Clause 3: The Escape Clause, similar to the way Hilary Duff's song "Santa Claus Lane" was used for The Santa Clause 2, and the music video also had scenes from the film. The video first aired on October 16, 2006 on the Disney Channel. The single debuted at number 96 on the US Billboard Hot 100 chart.

== Song information ==
The song was released to iTunes as the single version. The song is also featured in Disney's holiday albums, Disney Channel Holiday and All Wrapped Up. The version in Disney Channel Holiday is the album version, while the version in All Wrapped Up is a new edit, which has no bridge, and ended with a live-audience sound. The song was used as the finale for the 2009 Disney on Ice show, "Let's Celebrate". In 2011, this song was included in the soundtrack of the Barbie Christmas-themed movie, Barbie: A Perfect Christmas, as the bonus track.

== Music video ==
The music video was directed by Declan Whitebloom. The video does not include the intro but instead skips to the first verse of the song, and it also leaves out a small 8 second snippet just before the bridge. There are no other differences. The music video first aired on Disney Channel after Twitches in October 2006. Disney has begun airing it more frequently once The Santa Clause 3 came out in theaters and its Billboard debut. A version without any Santa Clause 3 scenes is featured on MTV.com.

== Release history ==
| Region | Date | Format | Label |
|---|---|---|---|
| United States | September, 2006 | Radio Disney | Hollywood |
| United States | November 21, 2006 | Digital download | Hollywood |

== Charts ==
| Chart (2006) | Peak position |
|---|---|
| US Billboard Hot 100 | 96 |
| US Billboard Pop 100 | 72 |
