= Mélanie de Jesus dos Santos =

Martinician artistic gymnast (born 2000)

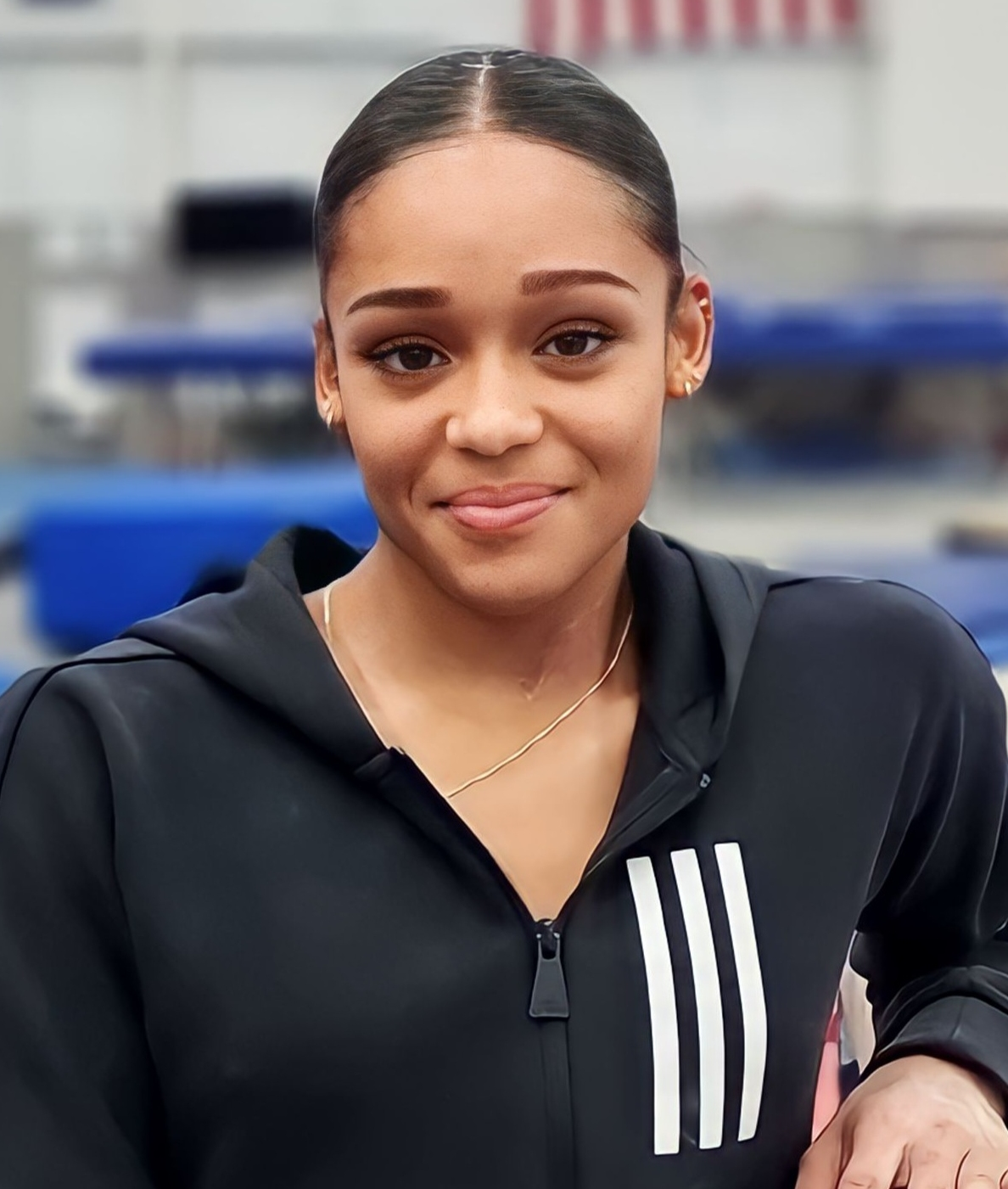
- de Jesus dos Santos at World Champions Centre in Texas

Personal information
- Full name: Mélanie Johanna de Jesus dos Santos
- Born: 5 March 2000 (age 26) Schœlcher, Martinique, France
- Height: 1.52 m (5 ft 0 in)

Gymnastics career
- Discipline: Women's artistic gymnastics
- Country represented: France; (2013–present)
- Club: Kréyol Gym Fort-de-France
- Gym: Kreyol Gym / INSEP / Pole France Saint Etienne
- Assistant coach: Marie Angéline Colson
- Former coaches: Eric Hagard, Monique Hagard, Laurent Landi, Cécile Canqueteau-Landi
- Choreographer: Grégory Milan
Medal record
Women's artistic gymnastics
Representing France
Event	1st	2nd	3rd
World Championships	0	0	1
European Championships	4	2	1
Total	4	2	2
World Championships
Bronze medal – third place	2023 Antwerp	Team
European Championships
Gold medal – first place	2018 Glasgow	Floor exercise
Gold medal – first place	2019 Szczecin	All-around
Gold medal – first place	2019 Szczecin	Floor exercise
Gold medal – first place	2021 Basel	Balance beam
Silver medal – second place	2018 Glasgow	Team
Silver medal – second place	2019 Szczecin	Balance beam
Bronze medal – third place	2017 Cluj-Napoca	All-around
FIG World Cup
Event	1st	2nd	3rd
All-Around World Cup	0	0	2
World Cup	3	0	1
World Challenge Cup	5	1	1
Total	8	1	4
- Awards: Longines Prize for Elegance (2019)

Mélanie Johanna de Jesus dos Santos (born 5 March 2000) is a French artistic gymnast. She was a member of the bronze medal-winning team at the 2023 World Championships. She is the 2019 European all-around champion, a two time European champion on the floor exercise (2018, 2019), and the 2021 European champion on the balance beam. She is also the 2018 European silver medalist with the French team, the 2019 European silver medalist on the balance beam, and the 2017 European bronze medalist in the all-around. She represented France at the 2020 Summer Olympics where she placed sixth with the team and on the uneven bars and eleventh in the all-around. She is the 2017, 2018, 2019 and 2024 French all-around champion, and she won the Longines Prize for Elegance in 2019.

== Personal life ==
De Jesus dos Santos was born in Schœlcher, Martinique, a French island. Her father is Portuguese and her mother is Martinican. She has two half-sisters, who live in Portugal with their father. She began gymnastics at age five at a club in La Trinité. She moved to Saint-Étienne in mainland France in 2013 to join the French national team and to train with Eric and Monique Hagard. She speaks French, English, and Martinican Creole. In 2022, she moved to World Champions Centre in Texas to train with Laurent and Cécile Landi.

== Junior career ==
At the 2015 French Championships, de Jesus dos Santos placed second in the all-around behind Lorette Charpy. She also finished fifth on the uneven bars and floor exercise. She helped the French team finish fourth at the 2015 FIT Challenge, and she also placed fourth in the all-around. During the qualification round of the 2015 European Youth Olympic Festival, she tore her ACL while performing a double twisting Yurchenko vault. Due to the injury, she was unable to compete for several months.

== Senior career ==
=== 2016 ===
De Jesus dos Santos returned to competition in June at the French National Championships in Mulhouse, placing fourth in the all-around, balance beam, and floor exercise. She was not selected for France's 2016 Olympic team. In July, she helped France win a dual meet against Romania, and she won the all-around gold medal. At the Joaquim Blume Memorial in November, she won the silver medal in the all-around behind Belgium's Nina Derwael. She ended her season at the Élite Gym Massilia where she won the balance beam gold medal, the team silver medal, and the all-around bronze medal, and placed fourth on the uneven bars.

=== 2017 ===
In March, de Jesus dos Santos competed in the American Cup, where she won the bronze medal behind Ragan Smith and Asuka Teramoto. She became the second French gymnast to medal at the American Cup after Elvire Teza won the gold medal in 1997. She then competed at the City of Jesolo Trophy where she placed fourth with the team and on the balance beam, eighth on the uneven bars, and ninth in the all-around.

At the 2017 European Championships in Cluj-Napoca, Romania, de Jesus dos Santos qualified for two finals: the all-around and uneven bars. She finished third in the all-around behind Ellie Downie of Great Britain and Zsófia Kovács of Hungary. She was the first French gymnast to win an all-around medal at the European Championships since Marine Debauve in 2005.

De Jesus dos Santos became the French all-around champion, beating reigning champion Marine Boyer by 1.400 points with a total score of 55.450. She also won a silver medal on the balance beam. She then won the silver medal on the uneven bars at the Paris World Challenge Cup. At the 2017 World Championships in Montreal, she finished fifth in the all-around. After the World Championships, she competed at the Élite Gym Massilia where she won gold medals with the team and on the uneven bars. She also won the silver medal in the all-around behind Angelina Simakova and placed fourth on the floor exercise. Her final competition of the season was the Toyota International, where she won the uneven bars gold medal and the balance beam silver medal behind Sanne Wevers.

=== 2018 ===
At the Doha World Cup, de Jesus dos Santos won the bronze medal on the uneven bars and the gold medal on the balance beam. She then won the bronze medal in the all-around at the Tokyo World Cup behind Mai Murakami and Trinity Thomas. In May, she received three gold medals at the French Championships in the all-around, uneven bars, and floor exercise. She defended her all-around title at the French Championships and also won gold medals on the uneven bars and the floor exercise. She also won the all-around gold medal at the Sainté Gym Cup and helped France win over Germany and Switzerland.

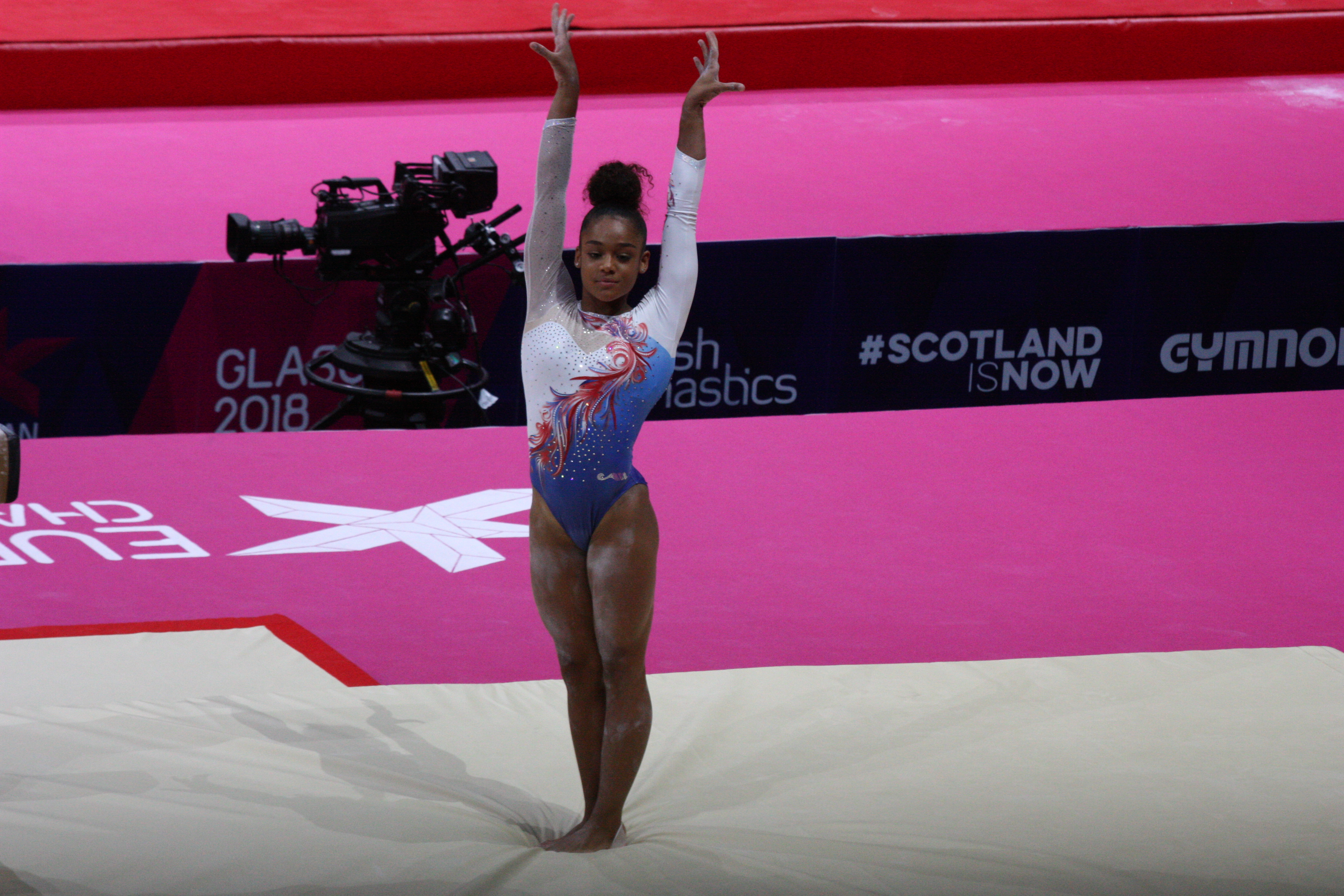
de Jesus dos Santos at the 2018 European Championships

In August, de Jesus dos Santos competed at the European Championships in Glasgow alongside Juliette Bossu, Lorette Charpy, Marine Boyer, Coline Devillard, and they finished first in the qualification round. The French team won the silver medal in the team final, behind Russia. De Jesus dos Santos qualified for two event finals, finishing in sixth place on balance beam and winning gold on floor exercise. She became the third French gymnast to win the floor exercise title at the European Championships after Ludivine Furnon in 2000 and Isabelle Séverino in 2005.

At the Paris World Challenge Cup, de Jesus dos Santos won the gold medal on floor exercise. She was selected to compete at the World Championships alongside Juliette Bossu, Lorette Charpy, Marine Boyer, and Louise Vanhille. The team qualified into the team final for the first time at a major international competition since the 2008 Olympic Games. The team ultimately finished fifth in the team final, their best finish at the World Artistic Gymnastics Championships since 1997. Individually, de Jesus dos Santos qualified for the all-around and floor exercise finals and finished sixth in both. After the World Championships, she competed at the Swiss Cup on a mixed team with Julien Gobaux, and they finished ninth.

=== 2019 ===
De Jesus dos Santos competed at the EnBW DTB-Pokal Team Challenge in Stuttgart where France placed fourth in the team final. She was selected to compete at the European Championships alongside Marine Boyer, Lorette Charpy, and Coline Devillard. She won the all-around gold medal ahead of the 2017 European Champion Ellie Downie. In the event finals, she successfully defended her floor exercise title, won silver on balance beam behind Alice Kinsella of Great Britain, and finished seventh on uneven bars. This made her the most decorated female gymnast of the championships, tied with Angelina Melnikova of Russia. She was the first French gymnast to ever win three medals at a single European Championships.

In June, de Jesus dos Santos won her third consecutive French all-around title, and she won the uneven bars and floor exercise titles. On 3 September, she was named to the team to compete at the World Championships in Stuttgart, Germany alongside Lorette Charpy, Marine Boyer, Coline Devillard, and Aline Friess. Later that month she competed at the Paris Challenge Cup where she won gold on uneven bars and placed seventh on balance beam. Then during the qualification round at the World Championships, she led the French team to qualify to the team final in fourth place behind the United States, China, and Russia. Individually, she qualified to the all-around final in third place behind Simone Biles and Sunisa Lee of the United States, the balance beam final in sixth place, and the floor exercise final in fifth place. In the team final, de Jesus dos Santos contributed an all-around score of 55.498 to help France finish in fifth place. This result qualified France for a team spot at the 2020 Olympic Games. In the all-around final, she fell off the uneven bars twice and finished all the way down in twentieth place. In event finals, she still finished off the podium, placing fifth on beam and fifth again on floor. She was awarded the Longines Prize for Elegance alongside American Sam Mikulak.

=== 2020–2021 ===
In February, it was announced that de Jesus dos Santos would represent France at the 2020 Tokyo World Cup. However, the event was canceled due to the COVID-19 pandemic in Japan. She did not compete in any international competitions in 2020.

De Jesus dos Santos competed at the 2021 European Championships in Basel. During the qualification round, she only competed on the uneven bars, where she fell, and the balance beam, where she qualified to the event final. During the event finals, she won gold on the balance beam, becoming the first French European Champion on the apparatus. Then at the FIT Challenge, she helped France win the team gold medal, and she won the all-around gold medal and the uneven bars silver medal behind Nina Derwael.

On 14 June, de Jesus dos Santos was selected to represent France at the 2020 Summer Olympics alongside Marine Boyer, Aline Friess, and Carolann Héduit. At the Olympics, de Jesus dos Santos helped France qualify to the team final where they finished sixth. She also placed eleventh in the all-around final with a total score of 53.698. De Jesus dos Santos was initially the first reserve for the uneven bars final but was called up to compete in the final after Simone Biles withdrew. She finished sixth in the final with a score of 14.033.

Following the Olympics, de Jesus dos Santos joined the cast of Biles' Gold Over America Tour.

=== 2022 ===
In April, de Jesus dos Santos moved to Houston to train at the World Champions Centre, the same gym as Simone Biles, under coaches Cecile and Laurent Landi. In October de Jesus dos Santos was named to the team to compete at the World Championships in Liverpool alongside Marine Boyer, Coline Devillard, Aline Friess, and Carolann Héduit.

=== 2023 ===
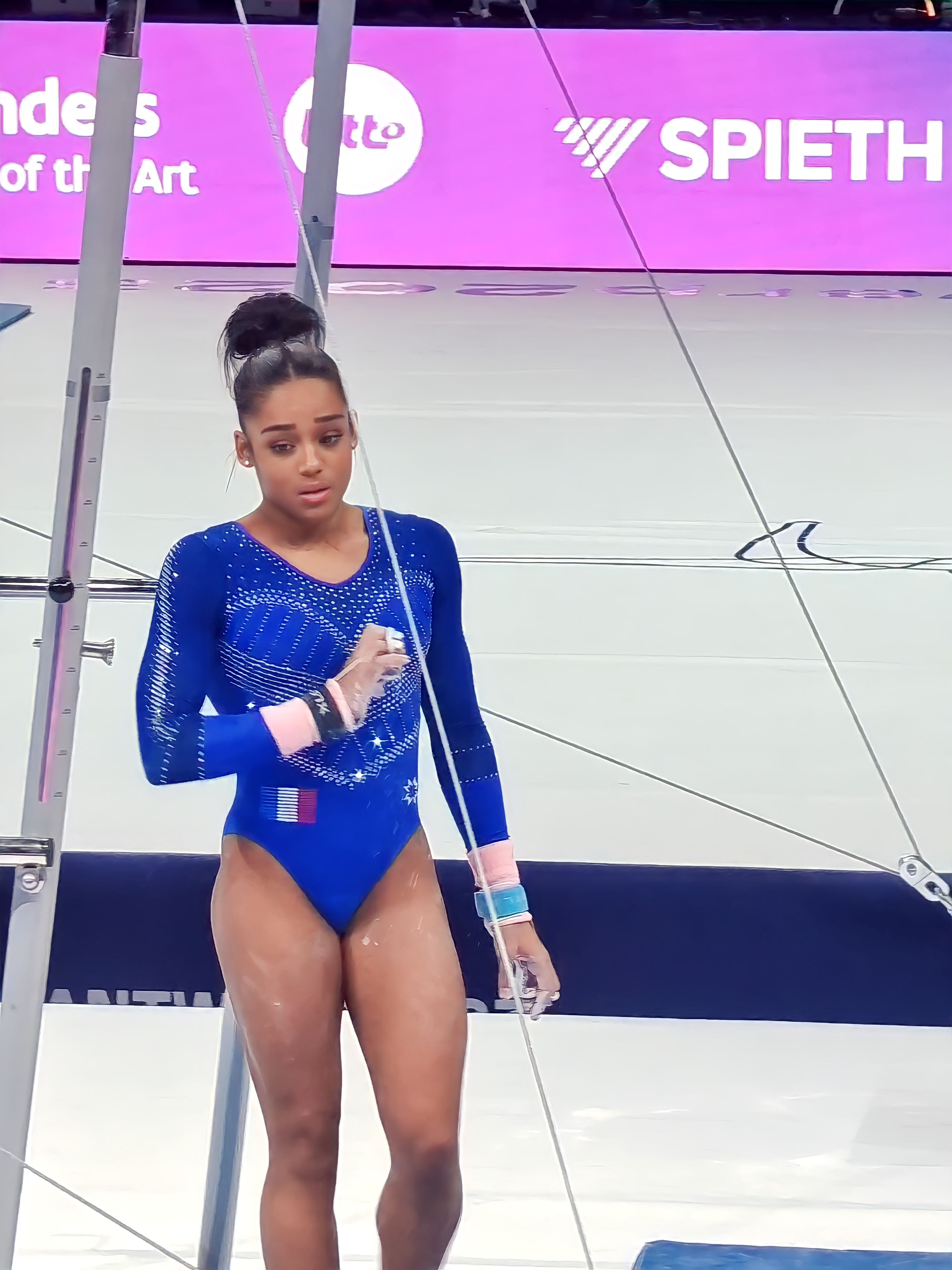
de Jesus dos Santos at the 2023 World Championships

In September de Jesus dos Santos competed at the Paris World Challenge Cup where she won gold on the uneven bars and on floor exercise.

She next competed at the 2023 World Championships alongside Marine Boyer, Lorette Charpy, Coline Devillard, Morgane Osyssek-Reimer, and alternate Djenna Laroui. Together they won the bronze medal in the team event, which was the first World Championships team medal for France since 1950. De Jesus dos Santos competed next in the all-around final where she ended up placing tenth.

She ended the year competing at the Arthur Gander Memorial, where she placed second behind Julia Soares of Brazil, and the Swiss Cup where she was partnered with Jim Zona; they finished fifth.

=== 2024 ===
In March 2024, de Jesus dos Santos announced that she was working on a new uneven bars routine after struggling to compete successfully her older routine counting multiple falls on her Nabieva release. She chose to bring back inbar stalders in her routine allowing her to increase the difficulty while shortening her routine. She also announced that was working on a new floor routine using Ezio Bosso's music choreographed by French dancer and choreographer Grégory Milan.

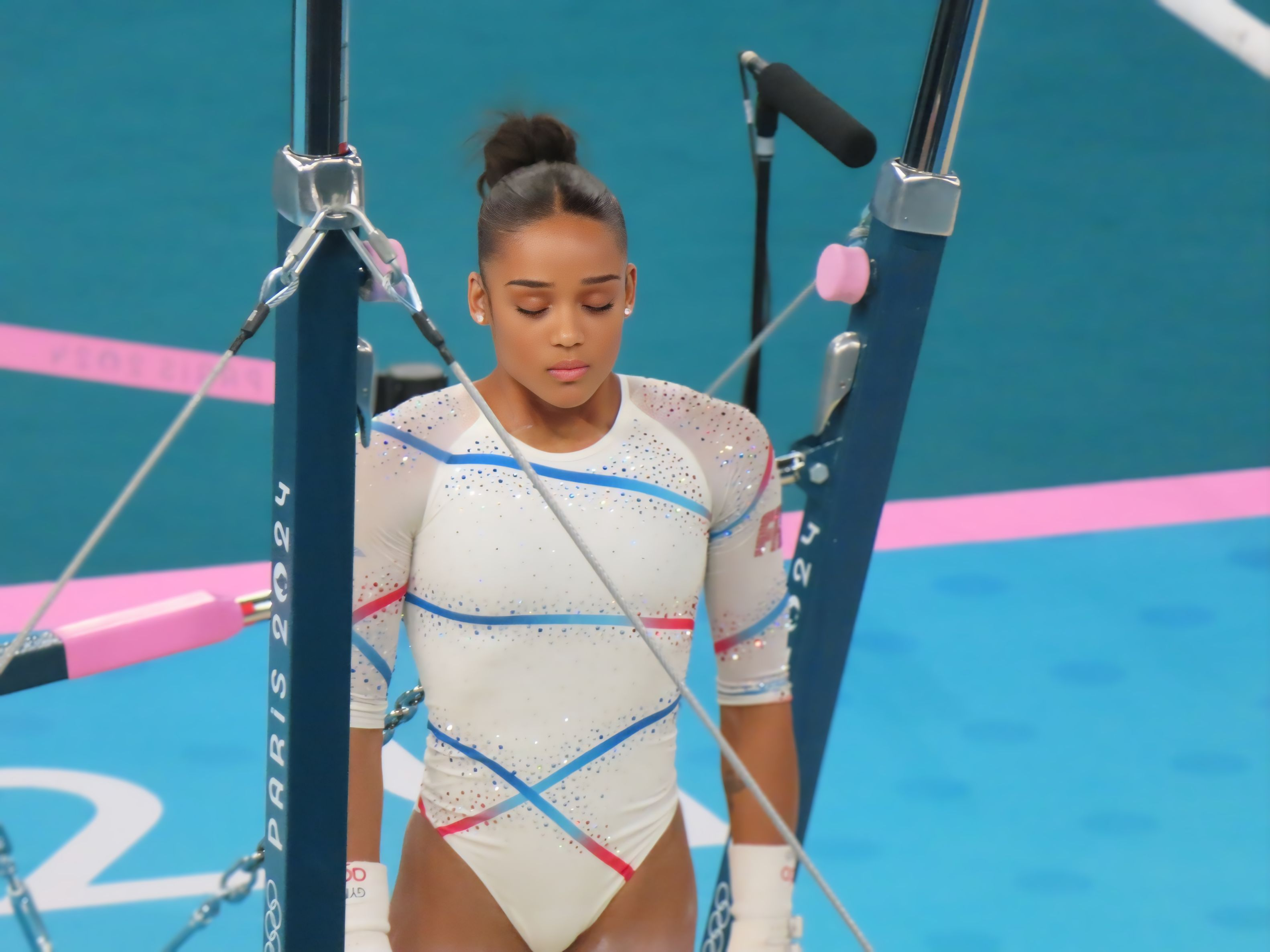
de Jesus dos Santos at the 2024 Olympics

In March, she competed at the World Challenge Cup in Antalya where she won gold on the uneven bars and won bronze on floor exercise. In April she competed at the World Challenge Cup in Osijek, Croatia. She won two gold medals – one on the uneven bars and one on floor exercise; additionally she won bronze on balance beam. De Jesus does Santos announced that she would skip the 2024 European Championships in order to focus on perfecting her routines in preparation for the 2024 Olympic Games.

In July de Jesus dos Santos was officially selected to represent France at the 2024 Summer Olympics alongside Marine Boyer, Coline Devillard, Morgane Osyssek, and Ming van Eijken. During the qualification round the French team suffered multiple mishaps. De Jesus dos Santos fell off the uneven bars while performing her routine, grabbed the balance beam while performing on that apparatus, and fell on floor exercise while performing her double layout. As a result the French team finished eleventh and did not advance to the team final. Additionally de Jesus dos Santos did not qualify for any individual finals but was the third reserve for the individual all-around final.

De Jesus dos Santos ended the year performing on Simone Biles' Gold Over America Tour, for the second time.

=== 2025–2026 ===
De Jesus dos Santos did not compete in 2025. She returned to competition at the 2026 French National Championships where she only competed on floor exercise. She scored a 13.350.

== Selected competitive skills ==
Apparatus	Name	Description	Difficulty (Note: Valid for the 2022–2024 Code of Points)	Performed
Vault	Baitova	Yurchenko entry, laid out salto backwards with two twists	5.0	2017-23
Uneven Bars	Bhardwaj	Laid out salto from high bar to low bar with full twist	E	2019-22
Uneven Bars	Double Layout 1/1	Dismount: Full-twisting (1/1) double laid out salto backwards	E	2017-24
Uneven Bars	Inbar 1/1	Inbar Stalder to full (1/1) pirouette	E	2024
Uneven Bars	Komova II	Inbar stalder Shaposhnikova transition to high bar	E	2017-19
Uneven Bars	Galante	Inbar stalder Tkatchev straddled	E	2017-19
Uneven Bars	Van Leeuwen	Toe-on Shaposhnikova transition with ½ twist to high bar	E	2017-24
Uneven Bars	Downie	Stalder Tkatchev piked	F	2024
Uneven Bars	Nabieva	Toe-on Tkatchev laid out	F	2021-23
Balance Beam	Double Pike	Dismount: Double piked salto backwards	E	2022-24
Balance Beam	Front Pike	Piked salto forwards to cross stand	E	2017-22
Balance Beam	Front Pike Mount	Mount: Piked salto forwards to cross stand from end of beam	E	2017-24
Balance Beam	Switch Ring	Switch Leap to Ring Position (180° split with raised back leg)	E	2016-17, 2021–22
Balance Beam	Layout	Laid out salto backwards with legs together (to two feet)	E	2017-22, 2024
Balance Beam	Full-in	Dismount: Full-twisting (1/1) double tucked salto backwards	G	2021
Floor Exercise	Mitchell	1080° (3/1) turn in tuck stand on one leg	E	2019-24
Floor Exercise	Mukhina	Full-twisting (1/1) double tucked salto backwards	E	2016-22
Floor Exercise	Double Layout	Double laid out salto backwards	F	2024
Floor Exercise	Chusovitina	Full-twisting (1/1) double laid out salto backwards	H	2017-21, 2023-24
Floor Exercise	Silivas	Double-twisting (2/1) double tucked salto backwards	H	2019

== Competitive history ==
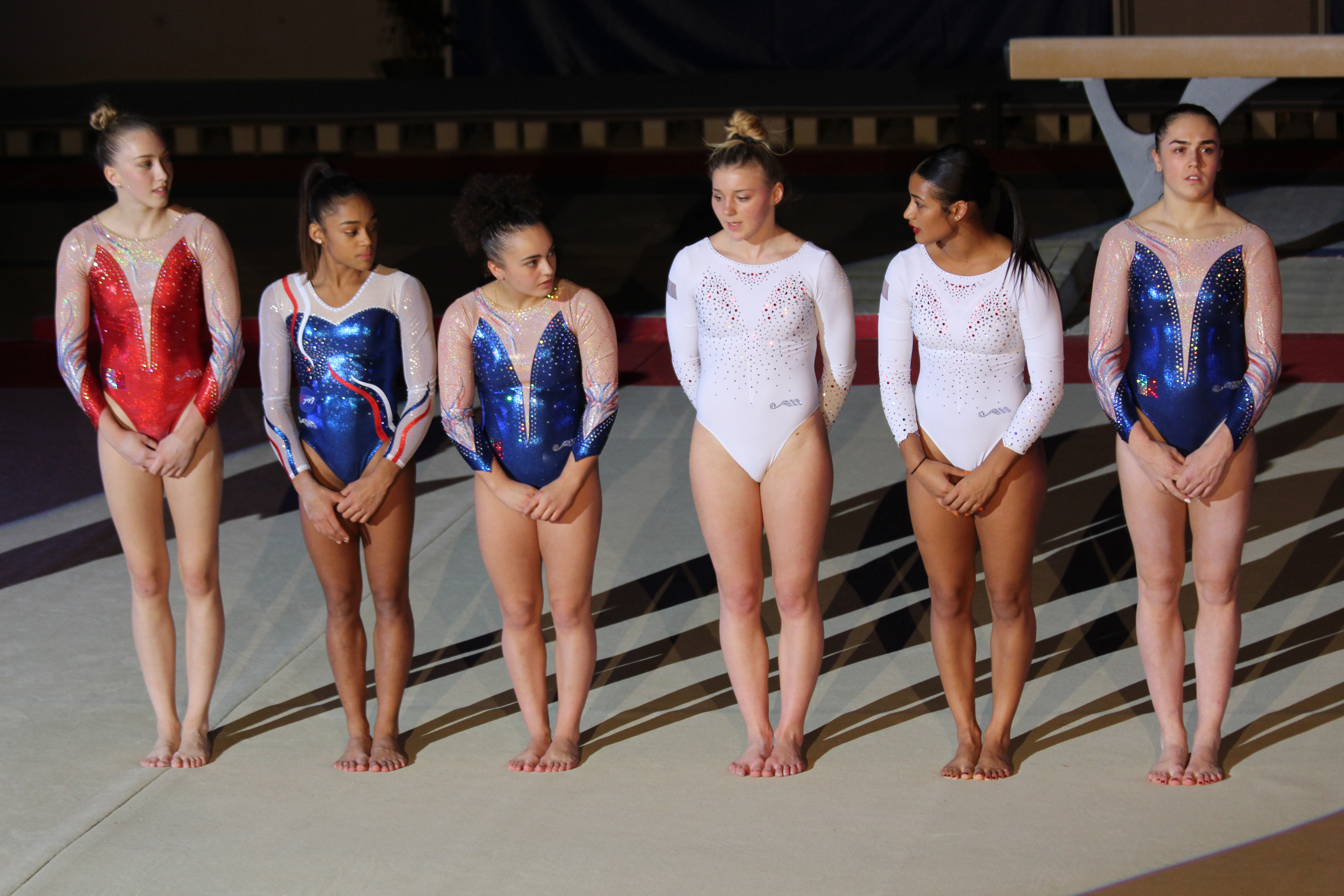
de Jesus dos Santos (second from the left) at the 2018 Sainté Gym Show alongside French teammates

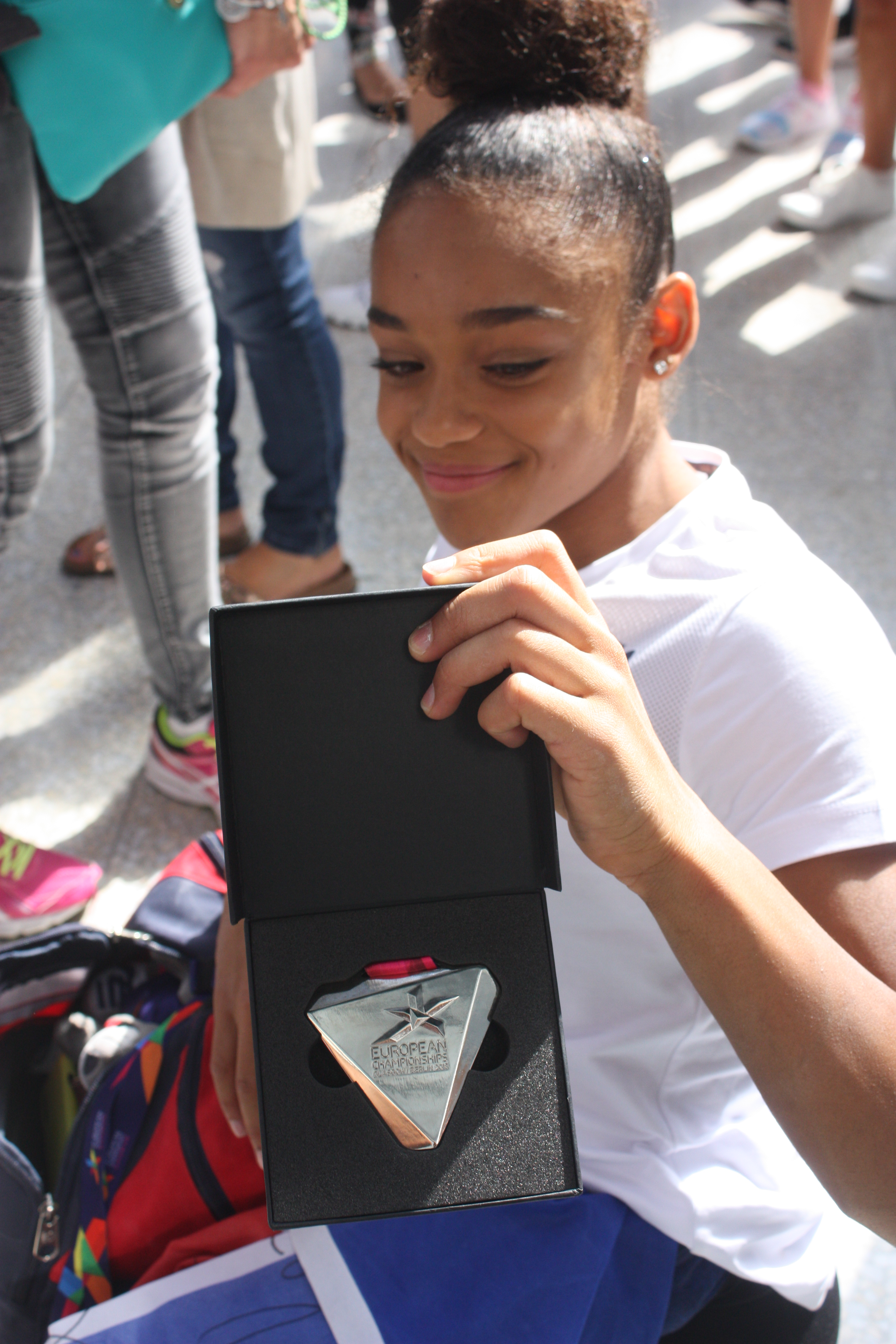
de Jesus dos Santos with her team silver medal from the 2018 European Championships

Competitive history of Mélanie de Jesus dos Santos
Year	Event	Team	AA	VT	UB	BB	FX
2015	Junior French Championships		2nd place, silver medalist(s)		5		5
2015	FIT Challenge	4	4				
2015	European Youth Olympic Festival	6					
2016	French Championships		4			4	4
2016	FRA-ROU Friendly	1st place, gold medalist(s)	1st place, gold medalist(s)				
2016	Joaquim Blume Memorial		2nd place, silver medalist(s)				
2016	Élite Gym Massilia	2nd place, silver medalist(s)	3rd place, bronze medalist(s)		4	1st place, gold medalist(s)	
2017	American Cup		3rd place, bronze medalist(s)				
2017	City of Jesolo Trophy	4	9		8	4	
2017	European Championships		3rd place, bronze medalist(s)		8		
2017	French Championships		1st place, gold medalist(s)		5	2nd place, silver medalist(s)	
2017	Paris World Challenge Cup				2nd place, silver medalist(s)	4	7
2017	World Championships		5		R2	R1	
2017	Élite Gym Massilia	1st place, gold medalist(s)	2nd place, silver medalist(s)		1st place, gold medalist(s)		4
2017	Toyota International				1st place, gold medalist(s)	2nd place, silver medalist(s)	
2018	Doha World Cup				3rd place, bronze medalist(s)	1st place, gold medalist(s)	
2018	Tokyo World Cup		3rd place, bronze medalist(s)				
2018	French Championships		1st place, gold medalist(s)		1st place, gold medalist(s)	6	1st place, gold medalist(s)
2018	Sainté Gym Cup	1st place, gold medalist(s)	1st place, gold medalist(s)				
2018	European Championships	2nd place, silver medalist(s)				4	1st place, gold medalist(s)
2018	Paris World Challenge Cup				8		1st place, gold medalist(s)
2018	World Championships	5	6				6
2018	Swiss Cup	9					
2019	EnBW DTB-Pokal Team Cup	4					
2019	European Championships		1st place, gold medalist(s)		7	2nd place, silver medalist(s)	1st place, gold medalist(s)
2019	French Championships		1st place, gold medalist(s)		6	1st place, gold medalist(s)	1st place, gold medalist(s)
2019	Paris World Challenge Cup				1st place, gold medalist(s)	7	
2019	World Championships	5	20			5	5
2021
2021	European Championships					1st place, gold medalist(s)	
2021	FIT Challenge	1st place, gold medalist(s)	1st place, gold medalist(s)		2nd place, silver medalist(s)		
2021	Olympic Games	6	11		6		
2022	Paris World Challenge Cup					6	
2022	World Championships	8	WD		R1		
2023	French Championships				1st place, gold medalist(s)	3rd place, bronze medalist(s)	
2023	Paris World Challenge Cup				1st place, gold medalist(s)		1st place, gold medalist(s)
2023	World Championships	3rd place, bronze medalist(s)	10				
2023	Arthur Gander Memorial		2nd place, silver medalist(s)				
2023	Swiss Cup	5					
2024	Antalya World Challenge Cup				1st place, gold medalist(s)		3rd place, bronze medalist(s)
2024	Osijek World Challenge Cup				1st place, gold medalist(s)	2nd place, silver medalist(s)	1st place, gold medalist(s)
2024	Olympic Games	11	R3				
