= Disney Channel Holiday =

Compilation album by Disney Channel stars
- Released: October 16, 2007
- Genres: Holiday; pop; pop rock; teen pop
- Length: 45:00
- Label: Walt Disney
- Producers: Matthew Gerrard, The Heavyweights, Marco Marinangeli, Mark Hammond, Richard Page, Bryan Todd, Antonina Armato, John Fields, Tim James, SMIDI, Fred Mollin

Disney Channel stars chronology
Disney Channel Holiday (2007)	Disney Channel Playlist (2009)

Disney Channel Holiday (titled Family® Holiday in Canada, and Disney Channel Christmas Hits in Europe) is a 2007 holiday album released on October 16, 2007. The album features musical artists associated with or popularized by Disney Channel singing their own versions of holiday songs. Some songs were recorded prior to the production of this album, while others were recorded specifically for it. The album peaked at No. 32 on the Billboard 200, and as of January 2008, the album has sold about 200,000+ copies.

== Production ==
Although the majority of the songs were recorded specifically for the album, some songs were recorded prior to the album's production. Ashley Tisdale released "Last Christmas" as a single in 2006, the same year that Miley Cyrus performed "Rockin' Around the Christmas Tree" at the Magic Kingdom Christmas Day Parade. Also in 2006, Aly & AJ released "Greatest Time of Year" as a single from their album Acoustic Hearts of Winter as well as to promote the then-recent film The Santa Clause 3: The Escape Clause. Monique Coleman performed a cover of Christmas Vacation the titular theme song of the 1989 Chevy Chase film National Lampoon's Christmas Vacation. On November 24, 2007, at 7:00pm, the CD was released on Radio Disney. The event was hosted by Drew Seeley, who sings a song on the CD as well. Ashley Tisdale and Corbin Bleu performed their songs from the album at the Macy's Thanksgiving Day Parade 2007. A music video for Corbin Bleu's "This Christmastime" premiered on Disney Channel in December 2007.

== Track listing ==
No.	Title	Writer(s)	Artist(s)	Length
1.	"Rockin' Around the Christmas Tree"	Johnny Marks	Hannah Montana	2:22
2.	"Girl of My Dreams"	Nick Jonas; Joe Jonas; Kevin Jonas	Jonas Brothers	3:12
3.	"Have Yourself a Merry Little Christmas"	Hugh Martin; Ralph Blane	The Cheetah Girls	2:34
4.	"Last Christmas"	George Michael	Ashley Tisdale	3:39
5.	"This Christmastime"	Elliot Lurie; Bleu	Corbin Bleu	3:28
6.	"Home for the Holidays"	Matthew Gerrard; Robbie Nevil	Keke Palmer	2:31
7.	"Best Time of the Year"	Colleen Fitzpatrick; Dave Derby; Michael Kotch	Christy Carlson Romano	2:43
8.	"Run Rudolph Run"	Marks; Marvin Brody	Billy Ray Cyrus	3:09
9.	"Celebrate Love"	Richard Page	Jordan Pruitt	4:03
10.	"Let It Snow"	Jule Styne; Sammy Cahn	Lucas Grabeel	3:11
11.	"Jingle Bells (A Hip Hop Carol)"	Jamie Jones; Jack Kugell; Jason Pennock; Massey	Kyle Massey	2:56
12.	"Greatest Time of Year"	Alyson Michalka; Amanda Michalka; Antonina Armato; Tim James	Aly & AJ	3:38
13.	"Christmas Vacation"	Barry Mann; Cynthia Weil	Monique Coleman	3:27
14.	"I'll Be Home for Christmas"	Walter Kent; Kim Gannon	Drew Seeley	3:35

== Release history ==
Country	Date	Label
United States	October 16, 2017	Walt Disney Records
Europe	October 28, 2007	EMI Records
Canada	November 13, 2007	Universal Music Canada
Brazil	November 5, 2008	Walt Disney Records
