= Jennifer Roy =

American children's author

- Born: May 26, 1967 (age 59)
- Education: State University of New York at Oswego
- Occupation: Children's author

Jennifer Rozines Roy (born May 26) is an American children's writer.

== Career ==
She is best known for fiction including Yellow Star, which won a Boston Globe-Horn Book Honor Award (2006), Sydney Taylor Honor Award, The William Allen White Children's Book Award (2009), a New York Public L Book, an ALA Notable Book, National Jewish Book Honor Award, and received starred reviews in Publishers Weekly, School Library Journal, VOYA and Booklist. She has written 35 educational books for children ages 5–16, including the "You Can Write" series.

Her first illustrated book is Jars of Hope, published August 2015. She also co-authored the Trading Faces series with her twin sister, Julia DeVillers. The second book in the series is Take Two, the third is Times Squared, and the fourth is Double Feature. The fifth book in the series is Triple Trouble. Her book MindBlind, about a boy who is profoundly gifted and has Asperger syndrome, was published in October 2010 and received a YALSA award.

Her 2018 book, Playing Atari with Saddam Hussein, was inspired by the true story of a young boy growing up in Iraq under the first Gulf war. It was co-written with Ali Fadhil, a translator in the trial of Saddam Hussein whose childhood inspired the book.

== Personal life ==
Roy lives in upstate New York with her son. She is also noted in World Almanac 2008. She is the twin sister of author Julia DeVillers and the sister-in-law of former US attorney David M. DeVillers.

== Books ==
- Yellow Star
- Mindblind
- Cordially Uninvited, series
- Trading Faces, series co-written with Julia DeVillers
- Playing Atari with Saddam Hussein
