= It Takes Two =

It Takes Two may refer to:

== Film ==
- It Takes Two (1982 film), a Hong Kong film directed by Karl Maka
- It Takes Two (1988 film), an American comedy film directed by David Beaird
- It Takes Two (1995 film), an American comedy film starring Mary-Kate and Ashley Olsen

== Music ==
=== Albums ===
- It Takes Two (album) or the title song (see below), by Rob Base and DJ E-Z Rock, 1988
- It Takes Two, by Soulsister, 1988

=== Songs ===
- "It Takes Two" (Marvin Gaye and Kim Weston song), 1966
- "It Takes Two" (Rob Base and DJ E-Z Rock song), 1988
- "It Takes Two", by Katy Perry from Prism
- "It Takes Two", from the musical Hairspray
- "It Takes Two", from the musical Into the Woods
- "It Takes Two", by Camila Cabello and Anna Kendrick from Trolls Band Together, 2023

== Television ==
=== Series ===
- It Takes Two (American TV series), a 1982 sitcom starring Richard Crenna and Patty Duke
- It Takes Two (Australian TV series), a 2006 version of the UK celebrity singing series Just the Two of Us
- It Takes Two (Singaporean TV series), a 2012 Chinese-language drama
- It Takes Two (game show), a 1969 American game show
- Strictly Come Dancing: It Takes Two, a UK programme 2004–present

=== Episodes ===
- "It Takes Two" (Desperate Housewives)
- "It Takes Two" (Make It or Break It)
- "It Takes Two" (RuPaul's Drag Race All Stars)
- "It Takes Two" (Smart Guy)

== Other uses ==
- "It Takes Two" (story), a 2009 science fiction story by Nicola Griffith
- It Takes Two (video game), a 2021 action-adventure game developed by Hazelight Studios

== See also ==
- Take Two (disambiguation)
