= Yellow Star (novel) =

Novel by Jennifer Roy

- Author: Jennifer Roy
- Language: English
- Genre: Historical fiction
- Published: 2006 (Marshall Cavendish)
- Publication place: United States
- Media type: Print (hardback & paperback)
- Pages: 227 pp.
- ISBN: 978-0-7614-5277-5
- OCLC: 61162378
- LC Class: PZ7.R812185 Yel 2006

Yellow Star is a 2006 biographical children's novel by Jennifer Roy. Written in free verse, it depicts life through the eyes of a young Jewish girl whose family was forced into the Łódź Ghetto in 1939 during World War II. Roy tells the story of her aunt Syvia, who shared her childhood memories with Roy more than 50 years after the ghetto's liberation. Roy added fictionalized dialogue, but did not otherwise alter the story. The book covers Syvia's life as she grows from four and a half to ten years old in the ghetto. Syvia, her older sister Dora, and her younger cousin Isaac were three of only twelve children who survived. After the war, Syvia moved to the United States, married, and only much later told her story to Roy. Since its publication in 2006, the book has received multiple awards, starred reviews, and other accolades, and has been made into a likewise well-received audiobook.

== Background ==
Yellow Star is the outgrowth of Sylvia Perlmutter Rozines' recollections of life in the Łódź ghetto. Perlmutter Rozines, then Syvia Perlmutter, was a four-and-a-half-year-old child when she and her relatives were confined to the ghetto in late 1939. The ghetto was liberated the day before she turned 10: more than half her life had been lived in the ghetto. The book relates the events of those five and a half years, as an adult Sylvia recalled them years later. The title derives from the yellow badge that Syvia was forced to wear.

More than 50 years after the events described in the book, Perlmutter Rozines began telling her story to family members, starting with her son, Roy's cousin Greg, who told Roy's sister Julia, who told Roy. Roy tape recorded the conversations between herself and Perlmutter Rozines, and used those conversations as the basis for the book.

Yellow Star is written in free verse, after Roy struggled with how to authentically express Perlmutter Rozines' experiences to children in a way that did not seem stiff or detached. Roy cites Karen Hesse's Newbery Medal -winning Out of the Dust as an inspiration for the book's voice. Roy edited Perlmutter Rozines' various recollections together into chronological order, and penned narrative introductions to each chapter describing the war's events outside the ghetto. While the book is substantially based on Perlmutter Rozines' recollections, it is classified as historical fiction since Roy included fictionalized dialogue.

== Plot ==
In 1939, the Nazis invaded Poland and forced that nation's second-largest community of Jews, 270,000 strong, into one section of the city of Łódź, which they later walled off to form a ghetto. Before the invasion, Syvia and her family lived in Łódź. When her father heard rumors of the impending German invasion, the family traveled by buggy to Warsaw. The family was unable to find work or housing in Warsaw, so they returned to Lodz. When the Germans did invade, they forced Syvia's family to relocate, along with other Łódź-area Jews, into a segregated section of the city: a ghetto. The book relates Syvia's explanations of what life in the ghetto is like: her friends, people around the ghetto, jobs, and her schedule. It relates how Syvia's family is forced to sell her doll, leaving her with rags and buttons as her playthings.

When the other Jewish children were sent to Chelmno, Syvia's family smuggled the children from cellar to cellar. The book also relates tragic events: one of Syvia's friends disappears, and another is killed and burned in an extermination camp. The ghetto is liberated one day shy of Syvia's tenth birthday, on January 19, 1945. Syvia, her older sister Dora, and a younger cousin, Isaac, were three of only twelve children who survived.

== Aftermath ==
An extensive "Author's Note" details the fate of the people Syvia interacted with in the Ghetto, including how the survivors in her immediate family settled initially in Paris. Afterwards, she emigrated to the United States, Americanized her name to Sylvia, married David Rozines (another Holocaust survivor), and settled in upstate New York as Sylvia Perlmutter Rozines. As of 2006, Sylvia, now widowed, had moved to Maryland, and volunteered at the United States Holocaust Memorial Museum in Washington, D.C. She gave a videotaped interview to the Shoah Foundation, which records the personal recollections of Holocaust survivors. Sylvia died on February 4, 2023, after a long battle with cancer.

== Reception ==
Yellow Star received starred reviews in Publishers Weekly and Booklist. The Publishers Weekly review commended the book for "the lyricism of the narrative, and Syvia's credible childlike voice, maturing with each chapter, as she gains further understanding of the events around her". Another reviewer praised the format, saying the "free-verse format suits the young narrator and subject matter well" and concluding that "Readers searching for an accessible Holocaust novel will be absorbed by this haunting story based on true events". Library Media Connection's review praises Roy for her age-appropriate language: "When Syvia witnesses the shooting of people in the street, author Jennifer Roy captures the fear of the moment without graphic descriptions". Yellow Star was selected as a "fiction and poetry honor book" in the 2006 Boston Globe-Horn Book Awards, an American Library Association Notable Children's Book for Older Readers in April 2007, and won the 2009 William Allen White Children's Book Award, selected by vote of sixth- through eighth-graders in Kansas. The book was given a Sydney Taylor Book Award Honor for Older Readers in 2007.

Yellow Star was made into an audiobook read by Christina Moore in 2007. A Booklist review noted that "Moore's 'vroom sput-sput pop' to mirror Nazi motorcycles, booming bomb sounds, and transition to a scratchy voice to reflect the youngster's oncoming sickness more than make up for a few technical glitches, including evidence of page turning and distracting breathing sounds."

Roy, whose other works include children's educational materials, hosts a variety of Yellow Star "Guides for Teachers and Book Groups" on her website.
