= Julia DeVillers =

American children's writer

- Born: May 26, 1967 (age 59); Colonie, New York, U.S.
- Education: State University of New York at Oswego (BA); Ohio State University (MA)
- Occupation: Writer
- Writing career
- Notable works: How My Private, Personal Journal Became a Bestseller; Trading Faces series

Julia Rozines DeVillers (born May 26, 1967) is an American writer of books including How My Private, Personal Journal Became A Bestseller.

== Early life and education ==
DeVillers attended Colonie High School in Albany, New York. She studied Communications at the State University of New York, Oswego and obtained an MA in Journalism from Ohio State University. Her twin sister, Jennifer Roy, six minutes older, is also a writer.

== Personal life ==
DeVillers lives in New Albany, Ohio, with her husband, former US attorney David M. DeVillers, and two children. She lived overseas for a year in Tbilisi, Georgia, while her husband worked in the US Embassy.

== In popular media ==
DeVillers had a cameo in the 2006 Disney Channel Original Movie, Read It and Weep, which was based on the book How My Private, Personal Journal Became A Bestseller.

== Bibliography ==
=== Fiction ===
- UltraSquad graphic novel series illustrated by Rafael Rosado (Justice Studios)
- The Maddie Ziegler series with Maddie Ziegler (Simon and Schuster)
- Co-written with Jennifer Roy: Trading Faces, Take Two, Times Squared and Double Feature (Simon & Schuster)
- Liberty Porter, First Daughter series about a 9-year-old girl whose father is elected president and moves into the White House. (Simon and Schuster).
- How My Private Personal Journal Became a Bestseller (E. P. Dutton).
- Emma Emmets, Playground Matchmaker (Razorbill).
- Lynnvisible (E. P. Dutton).
- Princess of Gossip, co-written Sabrina Bryan. (Simon and Schuster MTV books).
- Tuned In.

=== Nonfiction ===
- GirlWise: How To Be Confident, Capable, Cool and in Control (Random House).
- The College Dorm Survival Guide (Random House).
