= Take One =

Take One may refer to:

== Music ==
- Take One (Adam Lambert album), 2009
- Take One! (Shakin' Stevens album), 1980
- Take One (Susanne Sundfør album), 2008
- Take One (T. S. Monk album), 1992
- Primera Toma or Take One, an album by La 5ª Estación
- "Take One" (song), by Seo Taiji, 1998
- "Take One", a song by Kodak Black from Dying to Live

== Other media ==
- Take One (Canadian magazine), a defunct film magazine
- Take One, a 2014 Indian film directed by Mainak Bhaumik
- Take 1 (TV series), a 2022 Netflix docuseries music reality show

== See also ==
- Take Two (disambiguation)
