= All Wrapped Up =

EP by Various artists
- Released: November 4, 2008
- Recorded: 2006–2008
- Genre: Christmas; pop; pop rock
- Length: 21:30
- Label: Hollywood

All Wrapped Up EP chronology
All Wrapped Up (2008)	All Wrapped Up Vol. 2 (2009)

All Wrapped Up is a 7-track Christmas-themed extended play featuring musical artists signed to Hollywood Records singing their own versions of holiday songs. It was released on November 4, 2008, available exclusively at Target stores nationwide.

== Track listing ==
No.	Title	Recording artist(s)	Length
1.	"Joyful Kings"	Jonas Brothers	3:11
2.	"Santa Claus Is Comin' to Town"	Miley Cyrus	2:27
3.	"Christmas Won't Be the Same Without You"	Plain White T's	2:34
4.	"Celebrate Love"	Jordan Pruitt	4:01
5.	"Greatest Time of Year"	Aly & AJ	3:13
6.	"Bring Me Love"	Marié Digby	3:29
7.	"Wonderful Christmastime"	Demi Lovato	2:35
Total length:			21:30

== Chart performance ==
All Wrapped Up debuted at number 53 on the Billboard 200. and peaked at No. 10 in its eighth week on the chart.

=== Charts ===
Chart	Peak position
U.S Billboard 200	10

== See also ==
- List of Billboard Top Holiday Albums number ones of the 2000s
