= 2024 Gold Over America Tour =

2024 gymnastics touring show

- National tour by Simone Biles
- Location: United States
- Venue: Various — see venues
- Start date: September 16, 2024
- End date: November 3, 2024
- No. of shows: 32

Simone Biles concert chronology
- Gold Over America Tour (2021); Gold Over America Tour (2024)

The 2024 Gold Over America Tour, also called Athleta Presents the 2024 Gold Over America Tour, was the second gymnastics-themed touring show headlined by American artistic gymnast Simone Biles. It consisted of 32 arena shows across the United States and ran from September 16, 2024, in Oceanside, California, to November 3, 2024, in Detroit, Michigan.

The tour included several gymnasts from the U.S. women's national team—Jade Carey, Jordan Chiles, Hezly Rivera, and Joscelyn Roberson—and fan-favorites Trinity Thomas and Katelyn Ohashi. Unlike the first edition, which only included female gymnasts, the second iteration featured gymnasts from the U.S. men's national team, including Brody Malone, Paul Juda, Fred Richard, Shane Wiskus, Donnell Whittenburg, and Yul Moldauer. International gymnasts who joined the tour included Ellie Black and Peng-Peng Lee of Canada, Mélanie de Jesus dos Santos of France, and Casimir Schmidt of the Netherlands.

== Background ==
Biles launched the first Gold Over America Tour after the 2020 Summer Olympics as an all-woman tour blending sports and entertainment with the intention of inspiring a new generation of female athletes. Sponsored by the athletic apparel company Athleta, it sold 182,000 tickets and grossed $19.3 million across 32 cities. PopSugar described it as a "gymnastics-meet-pop concert spectacular".

Biles announced the second edition of the Gold Over America Tour in May 2024 as a follow-up to the 2024 Summer Olympics. Jordan Chiles, Jade Carey, Mélanie de Jesus dos Santos, Fred Richard, and Kayla DiCello were among the first cast members announced. Biles included male gymnasts to broaden the show's reach—particularly Richard, whom she credited with helping to make men's artistic gymnastics "relevant" in the United States, where women have dominated the sport. Other cast members determined after the run-up to the Olympics.

The tour incorporated elements of rhythmic gymnastics. There were discussions held about having SlamBall players join the "celebration of gymnastics" with the idea of bringing as many athletes on the show as possible. Dates were added in Oceanside and Boston to meet ticket demand.

== Cast ==
Name	Accomplishments
Simone Biles	2016, 2020, and 2024 Olympic gymnast (7 gold, 2 silver, 2 bronze), 30x World medalist
Ellie Black (Canada)	2012, 2016, 2020, and 2024 Olympic gymnast, 3x World medalist
Jade Carey	2020 and 2024 Olympic gymnast (2 gold, 1 bronze), 7x World medalist
Jordan Chiles	2020 and 2024 Olympic gymnast (1 gold, 1 silver), 3x World medalist
Mélanie de Jesus dos Santos (France)	2020 and 2024 Olympic gymnast, 1x World medalist
Ian Gunther	4x NCAA Champion (team), Stanford gymnast
Paul Juda	2024 Olympic gymnast (1 bronze), 1x World medalist
Peng-Peng Lee (Canada)	2x NCAA Champion, UCLA gymnast
Brody Malone	2020 and 2024 Olympic gymnast (1 bronze), 2x World medalist
Yul Moldauer	2020 Olympic gymnast, 2x World medalist
Katelyn Ohashi	2x NCAA Champion, UCLA gymnast
Fred Richard	2024 Olympic gymnast (1 bronze), 2x World medalist
Hezly Rivera	2024 Olympic gymnast (1 gold), 2x Junior World medalist
Joscelyn Roberson	2024 Olympic alternate, 1x World medalist
Casimir Schmidt (Netherlands)	2024 Olympic gymnast, 1x European Games medalist
Trinity Thomas	3x NCAA Champion, Florida gymnast
Donnell Whittenburg	2016 Olympic alternate, 2x World medalist
Shane Wiskus	2020 Olympic gymnast, 2024 Olympic alternate

Cast changes

- Kayla DiCello, one of the first cast members announced, was removed from the tour after she suffered an Achilles injury during the 2024 U.S. Olympic Trials.
- Shilese Jones, one of the first cast member announced, was removed from the tour after she suffered a torn ACL and meniscus during the 2024 U.S. Olympic Trials.
- Stephen Nedoroscik was previously confirmed as a cast member, but withdrew in order to compete in the thirty-third season of Dancing with the Stars.
- Asher Hong was previously confirmed as a cast member but was removed from the cast page.
- Donnell Whittenburg was hurt on tour and did not appear at further events. He remained on the cast page, but was replaced in the show with Riley Loos.

== Tour dates ==
List of 2024 shows, including date, city, state, and venue
Date (2024)	City	U.S. state	Venue
September 16	Oceanside	California	Frontwave Arena
September 17	Oceanside	California	Frontwave Arena
September 18	Phoenix	Arizona	Footprint Center
September 20	Los Angeles	California	Crypto.com Arena
September 21	San Jose	California	SAP Center
September 23	Salt Lake City	Utah	Maverik Center
September 25	Denver	Colorado	Ball Arena
September 27	Minneapolis	Minnesota	Target Center
September 28	Milwaukee	Wisconsin	Fiserv Forum
September 29	Chicago	Illinois	United Center
October 1	Newark	New Jersey	Prudential Center
October 2	Pittsburgh	Pennsylvania	PPG Paints Arena
October 4	Philadelphia	Pennsylvania	Wells Fargo Center
October 5	Brooklyn	New York	Barclays Center
October 6	Boston	Massachusetts	TD Garden
October 7	Boston	Massachusetts	TD Garden
October 8	Baltimore	Maryland	CFG Bank Arena
October 9	Charlotte	North Carolina	Spectrum Center
October 11	Sunrise	Florida	Amerant Bank Arena
October 12	Orlando	Florida	Kia Center
October 13	Duluth	Georgia	Gas South Arena
October 15	St. Charles	Missouri	Family Arena
October 16	Kansas City	Missouri	T-Mobile Center
October 18	Austin	Texas	Moody Center
October 19	Houston	Texas	Toyota Center
October 20	Fort Worth	Texas	Dickies Arena
October 27	Cleveland	Ohio	Rocket Mortgage Fieldhouse
October 29	Indianapolis	Indiana	Gainbridge Fieldhouse
October 30	Louisville	Kentucky	KFC Yum! Center
November 1	Greensboro	North Carolina	Greensboro Coliseum
November 2	Cincinnati	Ohio	Heritage Bank Center
November 3	Detroit	Michigan	Little Caesars Arena

== See also ==
- The Tour of Gymnastics Superstars
