= 2021 Gold Over America Tour =

Gymnastics-themed touring show

Gold Over America Tour
- National tour by Simone Biles
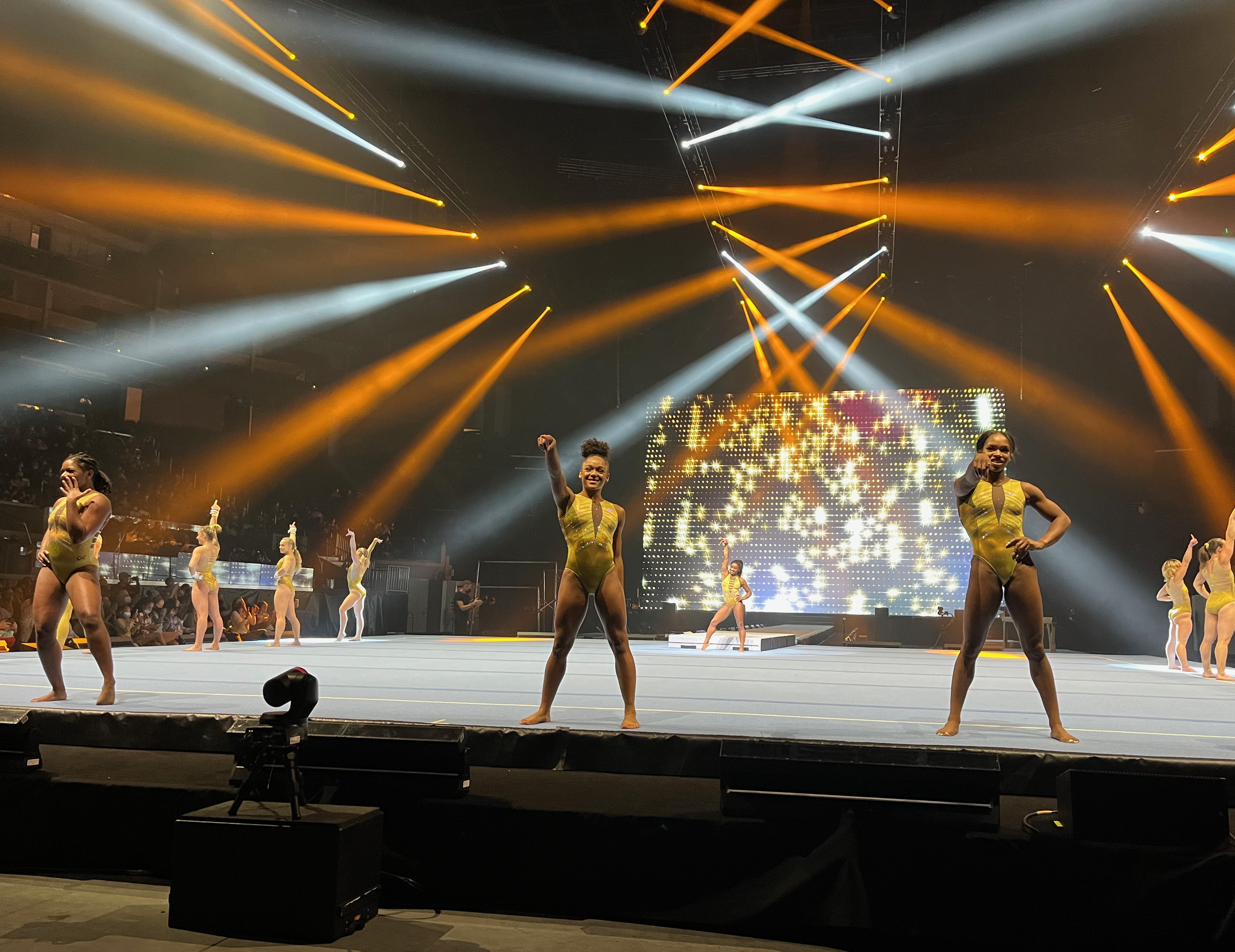
- The Gold Over America Tour performance in San Francisco
- Location: United States
- Venue: various — see venues
- Start date: September 21, 2021
- End date: November 7, 2021
- No. of shows: 35

Simone Biles concert chronology
- Gold Over America Tour (2021); Gold Over America Tour (2024)

The Gold Over America Tour, also called Athleta Presents Gold Over America Tour, was a 2021 gymnastics-themed touring show headlined by Simone Biles.

In late 2019, Biles announced her plans to launch an all-woman tour that would be a mixture of sports and entertainment intended to inspire the next generation of female athletes. Slated to take place after the 2020 Summer Olympic Games, the tour was to mount shows in 35 cities.

Former UCLA gymnast Katelyn Ohashi was the first cast member announced, followed by other high-profile gymnasts, including 2020 Olympians Jade Carey, Jordan Chiles, Grace McCallum, and MyKayla Skinner; and fan-favorites Morgan Hurd, Laurie Hernandez (who also provided the pre-recorded narration for the opening act), and Chellsie Memmel.

The tour ran from September to November 2021, played 34 shows in 32 cities (three dates were cancelled), sold 182,000 tickets, and grossed $19.3 million. One news outlet called it a "gymnastics-meets-pop-concert spectacular".

A second 30-city tour began in fall 2024.

== Cast ==
Name	Accomplishments
Simone Biles	2016 and 2020 Olympic gymnast (4 gold, 1 silver, 2 bronze), 5x World AA Champion
Ellie Black	2012, 2016, and 2020 Olympic gymnast (Canada) , 1x World medalist
Jade Carey	2020 Olympic Champion (floor), 4x World medalist
Jordan Chiles	2020 Olympic silver medalist (team)
Mélanie de Jesus dos Santos	2020 Olympic gymnast (France) , 2019 European Champion
Nia Dennis	NCAA Champion, UCLA gymnast
Laurie Hernandez	2016 Olympic Champion (team) and silver medalist (balance beam)
Morgan Hurd	2017 World Champion (AA), 5x World medalist
Shilese Jones	2018 Pan American Champion (team)
Grace McCallum	2020 Olympic silver medalist (team), 2x World medalist
Chellsie Memmel	2005 World Champion (AA), 2008 Olympic silver medalist (team), 6x World medalist
Katelyn Ohashi	American Cup Champion, NCAA Champion, UCLA gymnast
MyKayla Skinner	2020 Olympic silver medalist (vault), 4x World medalist

== Tour dates ==
Date	City	Venue
September 21, 2021	Tucson, AZ	Tucson Arena
September 22, 2021	Glendale, AZ	Gila River Arena
September 24, 2021	Anaheim, CA	Honda Center
September 25, 2021	Los Angeles, CA	Staples Center
September 26, 2021	San Jose, CA	SAP Center
September 28, 2021	San Francisco, CA	Chase Center
September 29, 2021	Sacramento, CA	Golden 1 Center
October 1, 2021	Boise, ID	ExtraMile Arena
October 2, 2021	West Valley City, UT	Maverik Center
October 3, 2021	Denver, CO	Ball Arena
~~October 5, 2021~~	~~Oklahoma City, OK~~	~~Paycom Center~~
~~October 6, 2021~~	~~San Antonio, TX~~	~~AT&T Center~~
October 8, 2021	Houston, TX	Toyota Center
October 9, 2021	Fort Worth, TX	Dickies Arena
October 10, 2021	North Little Rock, AR	Simmons Bank Arena (Note: Originally scheduled for and later canceled at Frank Erwin Center in Austin, Texas.)
October 12, 2021	Kansas City, MO	T-Mobile Center
October 13, 2021	Minneapolis, MN	Target Center
October 15, 2021	St. Louis, MO	Enterprise Center
October 16, 2021	Milwaukee, WI	Fiserv Forum
October 17, 2021	Rosemont, IL	Allstate Arena
October 19, 2021	Columbus, OH	Nationwide Arena
October 20, 2021	Cleveland, OH	Rocket Mortgage FieldHouse
October 22, 2021	Indianapolis, IN	Bankers Life Fieldhouse
October 23, 2021	Louisville, KY	KFC Yum! Center
October 24, 2021	Detroit, MI	Little Caesars Arena
October 26, 2021	Duluth, GA	Gas South Arena
October 27, 2021	Charlotte, NC	Spectrum Center
October 29, 2021	Pittsburgh, PA	PPG Paints Arena
October 30, 2021	Newark, NJ	Prudential Center
October 31, 2021	Washington, D.C.	Capital One Arena
~~November 2, 2021~~	~~Hartford, CT~~	~~XL Center~~
November 3, 2021	Bridgeport, CT	Webster Bank Arena
November 5, 2021	Philadelphia, PA	Wells Fargo Center
November 6, 2021	Brooklyn, NY	Barclays Center
November 7, 2021	Boston, MA	TD Garden

== See also ==
- The Tour of Gymnastics Superstars
