= Take Two (novel) =

2010 novel by Julia DeVillers and Jennifer Roy

- Author: Julia DeVillers; Jennifer Roy
- Language: English
- Published: 2010
- Publisher: Aladdin
- Pages: 304
- ISBN: 978-1416967316

Take Two is a 2010 juvenile fiction novel by Julia DeVillers and Jennifer Roy. This book is part of their twins series.

== Plot ==
The story line taking place right after the first book (Trading Faces) ends, identical twin sisters Payton and Emma Mills are entering detentions, when they learn they are to report to the school guidance counselor's, Counselor Case, office. Instead of serving detention, the twins must do community service, Emma tutoring Counselor Case's troublesome eight-year-old twin boys. The twins must deal with the social stigma of middle school, they both have their own friends, while remaining close. Payton is very close to Tess and seems to be developing a crush on Nick, the tech guy for the school play, although she doesn't know it yet. She also has to deal with Sydney and Cashmere constantly putting her down and works on standing up to Sydney. Emma is friends with Quinn, and is not officially in a relationship with Ox, although it is very obvious they like each other. Emma is nemesis's with Jazmine James, another very intellectual girl. Both are very competitive with each other.

As Emma's relationship with Ox continues and becomes better friends with Quinn, she gets very confused. Between tutoring the twin boys, who bring a gecko to Emma's lessons every time, creating even more stress for her, friendships and relationships, Emma feels she must decide between social life or winning competitions and beating her nemesis, Jazmine James, she decides to go back to being AcadEmma, all academics and no social life. Quinn and Ox get upset by this, Emma even breaking up with Ox and starts ignoring all Quinn's invitations to hang out with her. At the end, Ox is not allowed to date but wants to date Emma.

Meanwhile, Payton works in the stage basement, and is very upset that Tess and Sydney and everyone else get to be in the play, while Sydney constantly torments her. Payton also feels left out, and even resorts to pretending to be Emma and eating lunch in the library. When she sees Tess, Nick, Reilly and all her other friends from the play practicing without her, she is heartbroken. Payton also becomes better friends with Tess and Payton begins to have a crush on Nick, who returns her feelings, although neither of them are aware of that yet.

Things eventually get better for the Mills Twins. Emma wins mathletes, and when Sydney breaks her ankle the night of the school play, Payton takes over her role as Glinda from "The a Wizard of Oz". However, one of the twins that Emma tutors, Mason Case-Babbit, loses his gecko, so Payton must look for it, due to Emma having a phobia of small reptiles. Emma then takes over Payton's role, but everyone, except for Tess, who tells the twins that she knew after the play, thinks it's Payton. Emma gets over her fear of geckos and searches the basement herself after realizing how important the play is to Payton, and Payton goes on stage.

After the play, Payton and Emma meet Nick's family, when Emma realizes that she can succeed in competitions and do well in school and balance a social life at the same time. She becomes "unofficial" boyfriend and girlfriend with Ox, due to the fact that their parents think they are too young to date. Payton becomes aware of her crush on Nick (although not revealed until the next book). The Mills twins realize that everything will be all right for them.
