= The Tour of Gymnastics Superstars =

The Tour of Gymnastics Superstars was a 2008 nationwide concert tour featuring 17 American gymnasts plus recording artists Jordan Pruitt, Carly Patterson, and KSM. The tour visited 34 cities in more than 20 U.S. states.

The first show, in Reno, Nevada, was taped for a national broadcast on MyNetworkTV and included a musical performance by Hannah Montana actor Mitchel Musso.

Video from the second show, in San Diego, California, was included in Frosted Pink with a Twist, a television special about women's cancers (gymnast Shawn Johnson has a grandmother who is a cancer survivor). The special, which was broadcast on ABC on October 12, 2008, also featured singers Jesse McCartney, Kenny Loggins, and Grammy Award singers Cyndi Lauper and Carole King.

== Tour dates ==
Date	City	Arena
September 7	Reno, Nevada	Lawlor Events Center (broadcast nationwide on the MyNetworkTV network on September 26, 2008)
September 14	San Diego, California (in conjunction with Frosted Pink with a Twist)	San Diego Sports Arena (broadcast nationwide on the ABC network on October 12, 2008)
September 19	Phoenix, Arizona	US Airways Center
September 20	Anaheim, California	Honda Center
September 21	San Jose, California	HP Pavilion
September 24	Sacramento, California	ARCO Arena
September 26	Portland, Oregon	Rose Garden Arena
September 27	Tacoma, Washington	Tacoma Dome
September 28	Spokane, Washington	Spokane Arena
October 4	Broomfield, Colorado	Broomfield Event Center
October 5	Colorado Springs, Colorado	World Arena
October 9	Tulsa, Oklahoma	BOK Center
October 10	Houston, Texas	Toyota Center
October 11	Dallas, Texas	American Airlines Center
October 12	North Little Rock, Arkansas	Alltel Arena
October 15	Rosemont, Illinois	Allstate Arena
October 16	Nashville, Tennessee	Sommet Center
October 19	Raleigh, North Carolina	RBC Center
October 23	Philadelphia, Pennsylvania	Wachovia Center
October 24	University Park, Pennsylvania	Bryce Jordan Center
October 25	East Rutherford, New Jersey	Izod Center
October 26	Boston, Massachusetts	TD Banknorth Garden
October 29	Bridgeport, Connecticut	Arena at Harbor Yard
October 30	Washington, D.C.	Verizon Center
November 1	Columbus, Ohio	Schottenstein Center
November 2	Detroit, Michigan	Joe Louis Arena
November 6	Cleveland, Ohio	Quicken Loans Arena
November 7	East Lansing, Michigan	Breslin Center
November 8	Rockford, Illinois	Rockford MetroCentre
November 9	Saint Paul, Minnesota	Xcel Energy Center
November 13	Milwaukee, Wisconsin	Bradley Center
November 14	Des Moines, Iowa	Wells Fargo Arena
November 15	St. Louis, Missouri	Scottrade Center
November 16	Kansas City, Missouri	Sprint Center

== Cast ==
=== Female athletes ===
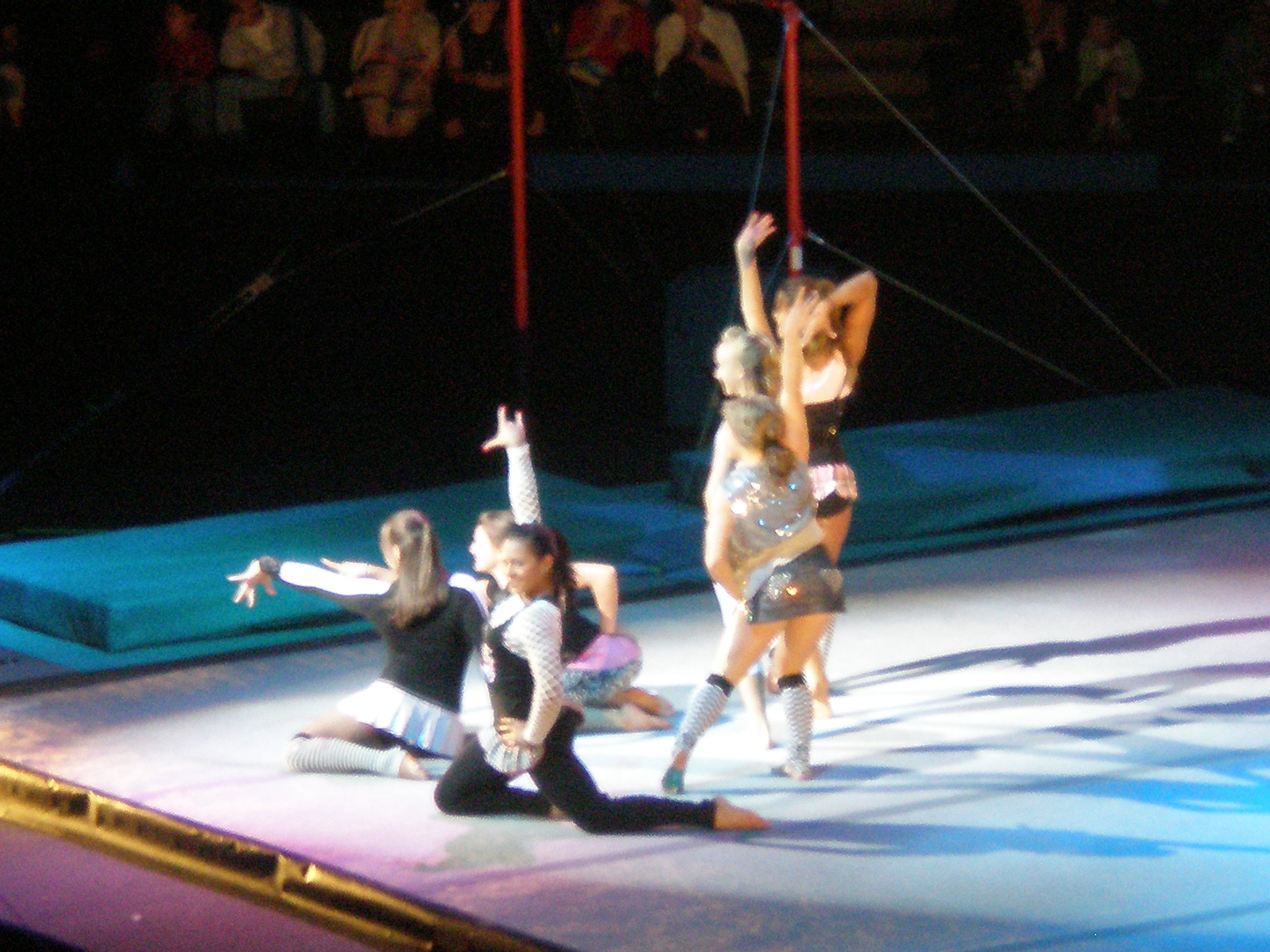
Female cast

(in alphabetical order by last name)

- Shawn Johnson
- Nastia Liukin
- Chellsie Memmel
- Shannon Miller
- Ashley Postell
- Samantha Peszek
- Bridget Sloan
- Shayla Worley
- Alicia Sacramone (replaced Shayla Worley)

=== Male athletes ===
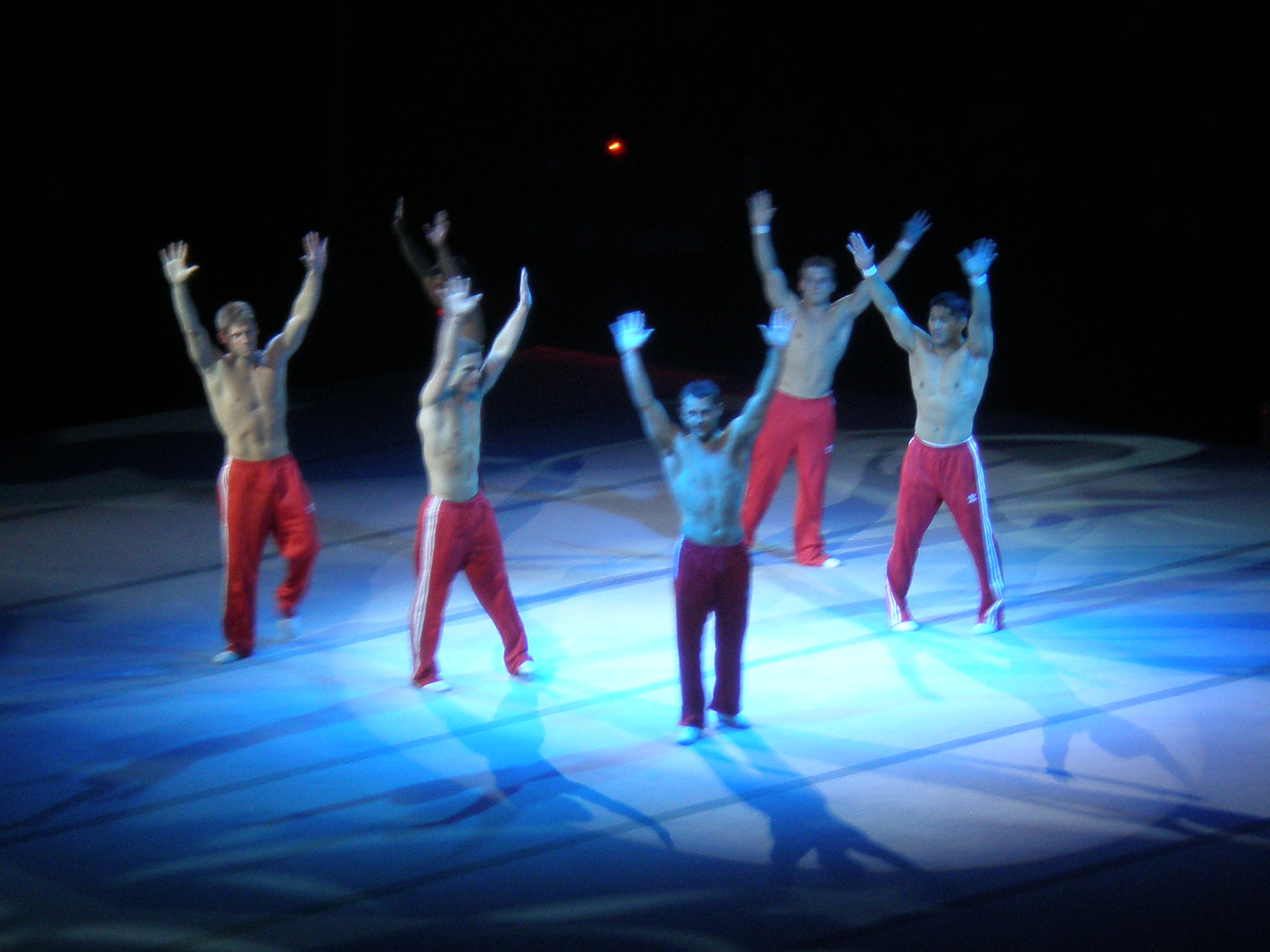
Male cast

(in alphabetical order by last name)

- Alexander Artemev
- Raj Bhavsar
- Joseph Hagerty
- Morgan Hamm
- Paul Hamm
- Jonathan Horton
- Justin Spring
- Kevin Tan
- Blaine Wilson

=== Support Cast ===
(in alphabetical order by last name)

- Aliane Baquerot
- Olga Karmansky
- Vladmir Sizov
- Mam Smith
- Luke Vexler

== See also ==
- 2021 Gold Over America Tour
- 2024 Gold Over America Tour
