= Permission to Fly =

Studio album by Jordan Pruitt
- Released: July 22, 2008
- Recorded: 2007–2008
- Genres: Pop; dance-pop; teen pop
- Length: 39:26
- Label: Hollywood

Jordan Pruitt chronology
No Ordinary Girl (2007)	Permission to Fly (2008)

Singles from Permission to Fly
- 1. "One Love" Released: June 10, 2008; 2. "My Shoes" Released: October 7, 2008

Permission to Fly is the second and final studio album by American singer Jordan Pruitt. On July 22, 2008, the album was released exclusively to Limited Too stores, and was given a wider physical release on August 26, 2008. In early September 2008, the album was uploaded on all digital platforms, but at a later date it was removed for all regions solely from the iTunes Store catalog, which to this date still remains the only digital platform not containing this release. Before its release, the worldwide premiere of the album was broadcast over Radio Disney on July 19, 2008.

== Background ==
Before the release of Permission to Fly, Pruitt had signed on as the spokesperson for several multi-media national marketing campaigns with brand such as Kraft Foods, Kimberly-Clark, Colgate-Palmolive, Samsung and Limited Too. When picking songs for the album, Pruitt used her "5-second rule." If the track didn't grab her in five seconds, she didn't record it. Pruitt worked with a team of top songwriter/producers, including Shelly Peiken, Arnthor Birgisson, Tim James and Antonina Armato (better known as Rock Mafia), and Adam Watts & Andy Dodd. Pruitt also co-wrote many of the songs, and wanted the album to be more mature than her 2007 debut album No Ordinary Girl. Speaking on the differences between Permission to Fly and No Ordinary Girl, Pruitt said "I kind of grew up after the first record was done. I became more of myself. I really found out who I was and what I wanted to be."

== Composition ==
Permission to Fly is mainly a pop album with influences of jazz and R&B. Several of the songs are about teen romance, with lyrics detailing love at first sight and the ups and downs of relationships. First single "One Love" is a reggae-tinged ode to a loyal partner, and second single "My Shoes" is about school crushes. "Boyfriend" is a confident assertion that her boyfriend won't be stolen by a flirtatious rival, and "Simple Things" is a song about how much pain can be caused by the smallest reminder of a former love. Other songs on the album are focused on self-empowerment and positivity. Title track "Permission to Fly" is about finding your own identity, and in "Unconditional" Pruitt sings about how her faith gets her through the toughest of times. The album consists of 11 original compositions with one cover, "The Way You Do the Things You Do" originally performed by the Temptations.

== Singles ==
"One Love" is the lead single from Permission to Fly. A snippet of the song was added on Pruitt's MySpace on June 10, 2008. She performed the song at the opening of the Disney Channel Games in 2008. It premiered on Radio Disney on June 14, 2008 and was produced by Shelly Peiken. It was made available digitally on July 8, 2008. "One Love" was very successful on Radio Disney, appearing in the top three of Radio Disney's website multiple times. The song failed to attract Top 40 mainstream radio airplay, and therefore did not chart.

"My Shoes" is the second single from the Permission to Fly. Pruitt performed the song at the opening of the Disney Channel Games in 2008. It premiered on Radio Disney on October 3, 2008. The music video for "My Shoes" was shot in a high school in Los Angeles, California on August 27, 2008. On December 21, 2008 "My Shoes" was released as a single digitally. "My Shoes" also failed to attract mainstream radio airplay and the song did not chart.

== Track listing ==
No.	Title	Writer(s)	Length
1.	"One Love"	Leah Haywood, Daniel James, Shelly Peiken	2:59
2.	"My Shoes"	Arnthor Birgisson, Savan Kotecha	3:26
3.	"In Love for a Day"	Antonina Armato, Tim James, Jordan Pruitt	2:48
4.	"Boyfriend"	Armato, James, Pruitt	3:32
5.	"Unconditional"	David Kopatz, Ben Dunk, Angie Irons	3:43
6.	"I'm Gone"	Adam Watts, Andy Dodd, Pruitt	2:38
7.	"Simple Things"	Haywood, James	2:45
8.	"Permission to Fly"	Aris Archontis, Jeannie Lurie, Chen Neeman	3:13
9.	"The Way You Do the Things You Do"	Smokey Robinson, Robert Rogers	2:54
10.	"Secrets"	Armato, James, Pruitt	3:11
11.	"I Wanna Go Back"	Watts, Dodd, Pruitt	3:18
12.	"Always"	Armato, James, Pruitt, Sean Hurley	4:23
Total length:			38:26

== Critical reception ==
Professional ratings
Review scores
Source	Rating
Common Sense Media	3/5 stars
AllMusic	Mixed

Permission to Fly received generally positive reviews from critics. Common Sense Media opined "While some of the songs have a bubblegum sound and predictable lyrics, there are some very likeable bright spots on the album, including a sassy remake of the Temptations classic, The Way You Do The Things You Do, and the surprisingly jazzy, syncopated Secrets. And, not all of the songs on this album are about boy stuff. Permission to Fly is about finding your own identity; in Unconditional, Jordan reminds us that she's a girl of faith, and how that gets her through the toughest of times. If nothing else, this teen is versatile." The site gave the album three out of five stars.

AllMusic gave the album a mixed review, saying "On her 2008 sophomore outing, Permission To Fly, young Southern singer Jordan Pruitt presents another assured set of Disney-approved pop. While there are no drastic stylistic departures, Pruitt expands on her straightforward teen-pop sound with the reggae-tinged One Love (not to be confused with the Bob Marley song of the same name) and the R&B-leaning Unconditional." "One Love", "Unconditional", and "Simple Things" were listed as the stand-out tracks on the album.

== Credits ==
Credits for Permission to Fly adapted from Allmusic

- Aris Archontis -Audio Production, Mixing
- Antonina Armato – Audio Production
- Mats Berntoft – Guitars, Member of Attributed Artist
- Arnthor Birgisson – Audio Production
- David Choi – Programming
- Andy Dodd – Audio Production, Drums, Guitar (Acoustic), Keyboards, Mixing, Programming
- Dream Lab – Audio Production
- Mark Hammond – Audio Production
- Steve Hammons – Audio Engineer
- Leah Haywood – Vocals
- Tal Herzberg – Audio Engineer
- Sean Hurley – Bass (Acoustic), Bass Instrument
- Angie Irons – Arranger, Vocals
- Daniel James – Audio Engineer, Vocals
- Tim James – Audio Production
- Adam Kagan – Mixing
- Devrim "DK" Karaoglu – Audio Production
- David Kopatz – Arranger, Audio Production, Guitars, Mixing, Programming
- Savan Kotecha – Vocals (Background)
- Nigel Lundemo – Audio Engineer
- Jeannie Lurie – Audio Production
- Chen Neeman – Audio Production
- Paul Palmer – Mixing
- Tim Pierce – Guitars
- Jordan Pruitt – Primary Artist, Vocals, Vocals (Background)
- Brian Reeves – Audio Engineer, Mixing
- Reid Shippen – Mixing
- Mounia Tajiou – Vocals (Background)
- Phil Tan – Mixing
- Windy Wagner – Vocals, Vocals (Background)
- Adam Watts – Audio Production, Keyboards, Mixing, Programming

== Release history ==
Country	Date
United States	July 22, 2008 (Limited Too release)
United States	August 26, 2008 (Amazon.com release)
