= Jump to the Rhythm =

Single by Jordan Pruitt

from the album No Ordinary Girl and the Jump In! soundtrack
- Released: December 17, 2006
- Recorded: 2006
- Genre: Teen pop, dance-pop
- Length: 3:46
- Label: Hollywood
- Songwriters: Frank Fitzpatrick, Robyn Johnson
- Producers: Frank Fitzpatrick, Keith Thomas

Jordan Pruitt singles chronology
"We Are Family" (2006)	"Jump to the Rhythm" (2006)	"Teenager" (2007)

"Jump to the Rhythm" is a pop song performed by American singer Jordan Pruitt. It was written by Frank Fitzpatrick and Robyn Johnson and produced by Fitzpatrick and Keith Thomas for the soundtrack of the 2007 Disney Channel Original Movie Jump In!. The song also appears on Pruitt's debut album, No Ordinary Girl (2007).

== Music video ==
The accompanying music video, directed by Declan Whitebloom, features Pruitt singing while walking along a city sidewalk. Subsequent scenes show Pruitt and a group of dancers performing choreography on the steps of a house and on a fire escape, building to a sequence of group dancing in the street. The video intercuts these performance scenes with clips from Jump In!.

== Chart performance ==
"Jump to the Rhythm" debuted at number 69 on the Billboard Hot 100 for the chart dated January 27, 2007, marking Pruitt's first appearance on the chart. It peaked at number 54 the following week, becoming her highest-charting single.

=== Charts ===
Chart (2007)	Peak position
U.S. Billboard Hot 100	54
U.S. Billboard Pop 100	45
