= No Ordinary Girl =

Studio album by Jordan Pruitt
- Released: February 6, 2007
- Length: 40:58
- Label: Hollywood
- Producers: Keith Thomas; Frank Fitzpatrick; Dan Shea

Jordan Pruitt chronology
No Ordinary Girl (2007)	Permission to Fly (2008)

Alternative cover
- Japanese cover

Singles from No Ordinary Girl
- 1. "Outside Looking In" Released: June 2006; 2. "We Are Family" Released: October 24, 2006; 3. "Jump to the Rhythm" Released: December 17, 2006; 4. "Teenager" Released: July 3, 2007

No Ordinary Girl is the debut studio album by Jordan Pruitt, released on February 6, 2007, by Hollywood Records.

The album debuted and peaked at number 64 on the US Billboard 200 with 14,000 copies sold in its first week.

== Track listing ==
No.	Title	Writer(s)	Length
1.	"No Ordinary Girl"	Jordan Pruitt; Robin Scoffield; Keith Thomas	3:08
2.	"Miss Popularity"	Pruitt; Scoffield; Thomas	3:46
3.	"Over It"	Pruitt; Thomas; Pete Kipley	3:28
4.	"Teenager"	Pruitt; Scoffield; Thomas	2:58
5.	"Outside Looking In"	Pruitt; Scoffield; Thomas	2:40
6.	"We Are Family"	Nile Rodgers; Bernard Edwards	3:23
7.	"Waiting for You"	Pruitt; Scoffield; Thomas	3:50
8.	"Jump to the Rhythm"	Frank Fitzpatrick; Robyn Johnson; Thomas	3:47
9.	"My Reality"	Pruitt; Scoffield; Thomas	3:26
10.	"Who Likes Who"	Ryanna Brown; Scoffield; Thomas	3:19
11.	"Later"	Pruitt; Scoffield; Dan Shea	3:32
12.	"When I Pretend"	Pruitt; Scoffield; Thomas	3:47
Total length:			40:58

Best Buy bonus track
No.	Title	Writer(s)	Length
13.	"Whatever"	Pruitt; Scoffield; Thomas	3:18

Target bonus track
No.	Title	Writer(s)	Length
13.	"Waiting for the Weekend"	Pruitt; Scoffield; Thomas; Jeremy Thomas	3:26

Japanese bonus track
No.	Title	Writer(s)	Length
14.	"Whatever"	Pruitt; Scoffield; Thomas	3:18

Bonus DVD edition

1. "Teenager" behind the scenes
2. "Outside Looking In" music video
3. "We Are Family" music video
4. "Jump to the Rhythm" music video

== Charts ==
Chart (2007)	Peak position
U.S. Billboard 200	64

== Release history ==
Country	Date	Label
United States	February 6, 2007	Hollywood
