= Jordan Pruitt =

American singer (born 1991)

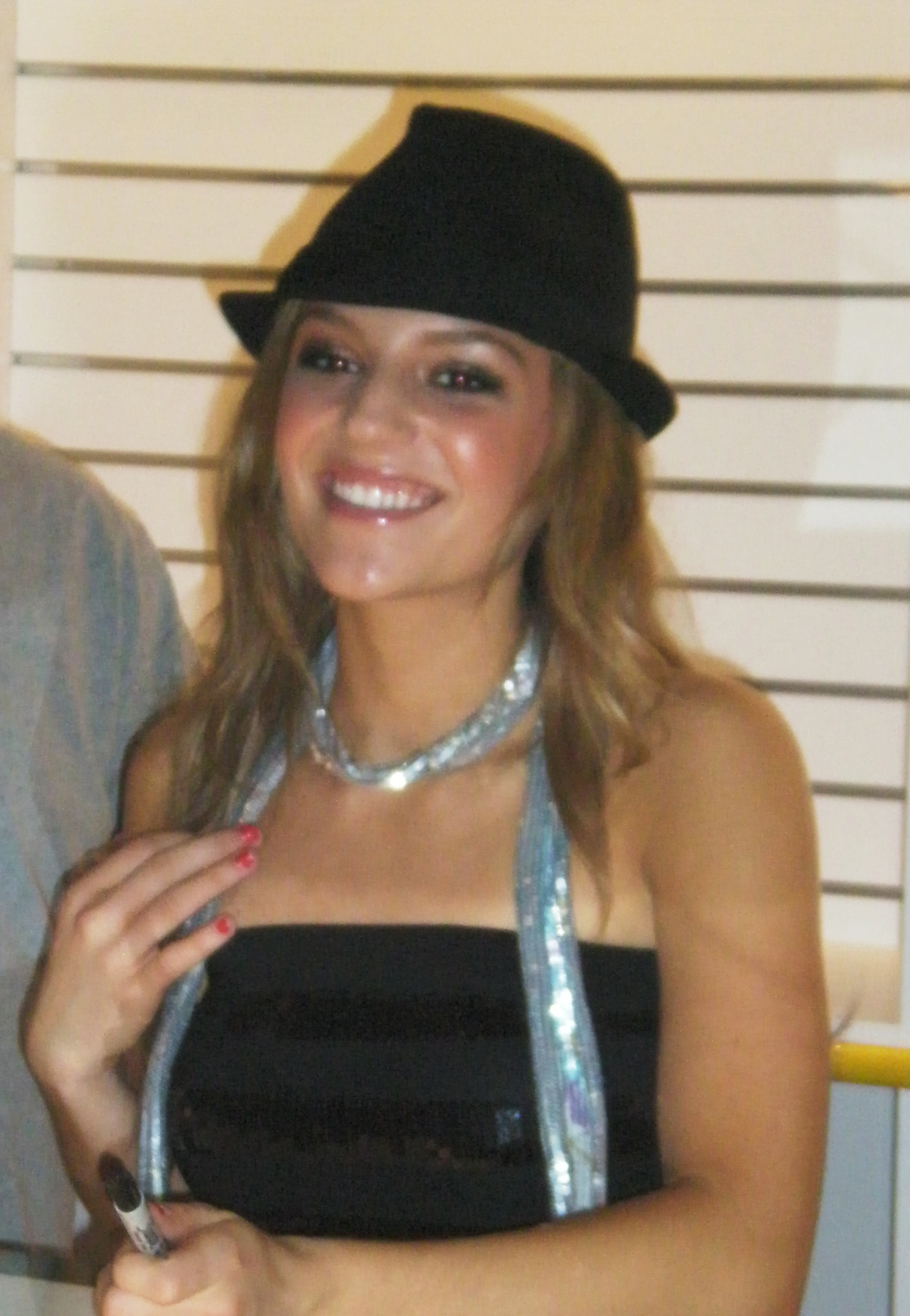
- Pruitt signing autographs in San Jose, California, September 2008

Background information
- Born: Jordan Lynne Pruitt; May 19, 1991 (age 35); Loganville, Georgia, U.S.
- Genres: Pop; R&B; dance-pop; teen pop
- Occupation: Singer
- Years active: 2005–2017; 2026-present
- Labels: Hollywood; Jonas
- Spouse: Brian Fuente (m. 2015)

Jordan Pruitt Fuente (née Jordan Lynne Pruitt; born May 19, 1991) is an American pop singer. She has released two studio albums on Hollywood Records — No Ordinary Girl (2007) and Permission to Fly (2008) — and toured as an opening act for artists including the Jonas Brothers, Demi Lovato, and the Cheetah Girls. Her debut single, "Outside Looking In", reached number 77 on the U.S. Billboard Hot 100. In 2012, she appeared on the third season of The Voice as a member of Christina Aguilera's team. She retired from music in December 2017.

== Early life ==
Pruitt was born and raised in Loganville, Georgia, where she attended Covenant Christian Academy. She began writing songs at age nine. In 2005, she recorded a demo EP and was subsequently signed to Hollywood Records.

== Career ==
=== 2006–2010: No Ordinary Girl and Permission to Fly ===
In June 2006, Pruitt's debut single, "Outside Looking In", was released to promote the Disney Channel television film Read It and Weep. Her debut studio album, No Ordinary Girl, was released on February 6, 2007, and peaked at number 64 on the US Billboard 200. During this period, Pruitt served as an opening act on several tours, including the Cheetah Girls' 2006 tour and all dates of the High School Musical: The Concert in 2006 and 2007. She was also featured on "Jump to the Rhythm", the main theme song for the 2007 Disney film Jump In!.

Pruitt's second studio album, Permission to Fly, was released on July 22, 2008. She also recorded "Take to the Sky" for the soundtrack of the film Tinker Bell and the Lost Treasure, and her cover of "This Christmas" appeared on the compilation album All Wrapped Up Vol. 2. In 2009, Pruitt toured with Demi Lovato on the Demi Lovato: Live in Concert tour.

=== 2011–2012: Label change and unreleased material ===
In February 2011, Pruitt departed Hollywood Records and signed to Jonas Records. She released a demo version of a new song, "Shy Boy", on March 1, 2011, via Facebook and YouTube for promotional purposes. On July 5, 2011, Pruitt posted a preview of another new song, "Something's Gotta Give", on her YouTube account. No third studio album was released.

On September 2, 2012, on her website, Pruitt announced that she would release seven previously unreleased songs over the course of a week, each accompanied by a music video. On October 12, 2012, following the suicide of Amanda Todd, Pruitt posted a YouTube video titled "R.I.P Amanda Todd", noting that Todd's last YouTube video had featured her singing Pruitt's song "Outside Looking In". In the video, Pruitt spoke against bullying and cyberbullying.

=== 2012–2017: The Voice and retirement ===
Pruitt auditioned for the third season of The Voice, with her blind audition airing on NBC on September 24, 2012. She performed "The One That Got Away" by Katy Perry, and Christina Aguilera was the only coach to turn her chair, placing Pruitt on Team Christina. In the battle round, which aired on October 23, 2012, Pruitt and Adriana Louise performed "Hot n Cold" by Perry; Aguilera selected Louise as the winner, eliminating Pruitt from the competition.

On December 1, 2017, Pruitt announced her retirement from music.

== Personal life ==
Pruitt is a Christian.

In May 2014, Pruitt became engaged to Brian Fuente, a fellow The Voice contestant. They married on May 24, 2015, and have two children. Pruitt and Fuente co-own The Aero Bar and AeroBuild in Nashville.

In December 2018, Pruitt wrote a lengthy Facebook post about past abuse she experienced in the music business. Pruitt eventually named Nashville record producer Keith Thomas, her former manager, as her abuser in her lawsuit filed on August 14, 2019.

== Discography ==
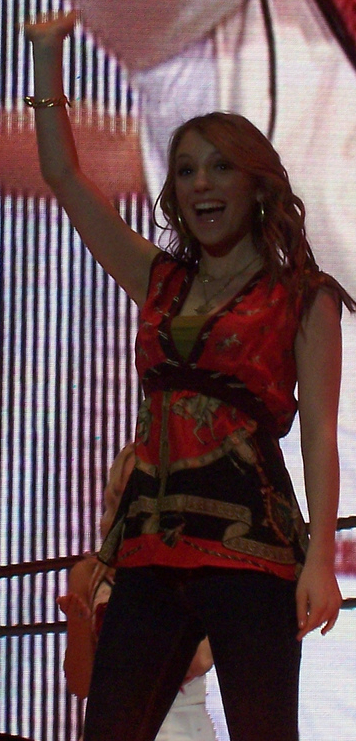
Pruitt onstage in 2007

- No Ordinary Girl (2007)
- Permission to Fly (2008)

== Tours ==
=== Opening act ===
- The Cheetah Girls – The Party's Just Begun Tour (2006)
- High School Musical cast – High School Musical: The Concert (2006–2007)
- Jonas Brothers – Six Flags-State Fair Tour (2007)
- Drake Bell and Corbin Bleu – State Fair Tour (2007)
- Simon D Mall Tour (2007)
- Family Channel Spring Break Kickin' It (2007)
- The Plain White Tees (2007)
- Corbin Bleu and Vanessa Hudgens (2007)
- Canada's Wonderland (2008)
- Raven-Symoné Live Tour! (2008–2009)
- Demi Lovato – Demi Lovato: Live In Concert (2009)

=== Co-headlining ===
- The Tour of Gymnastics Superstars (2008) (with KSM and Carly Patterson)
- Max Schneider and Jordan Pruitt Summer Tour (2013) (with Max Schneider)
