= Read It and Weep =

2006 American TV movie

- DVD cover
- Based on: How My Private, Personal Journal Became A Bestseller by Julia DeVillers
- Written by: Patrick J. Clifton; Beth Rigazio
- Directed by: Paul Hoen
- Starring: Kay Panabaker; Danielle Panabaker; Allison Scagliotti; Jason Dolley
- Theme music composer: Danny Lux
- Country of origin: United States
- Original language: English

Production
- Producers: Don Schain; Sheri Singer
- Cinematography: Gordon Lonsdale
- Editor: Louis Cioffi
- Running time: 84 minutes
- Production companies: Just Singer Entertainment; Salty Pictures

Original release
- Network: Disney Channel
- Release: July 21, 2006

Read It and Weep is a 2006 American comedy-drama film released as a Disney Channel Original Movie. It premiered on July 21, 2006. It is based on the novel How My Private, Personal Journal Became A Bestseller by Julia DeVillers. Sisters Kay and Danielle Panabaker star as Jamie Bartlett and her alter ego Isabella (Iz or Is), respectively. Both sisters have starred in previous Disney Channel films: Kay in Life Is Ruff (2005), and Danielle in Stuck in the Suburbs (2004); like Read It and Weep, those films also premiered in July in their respective years.

== Plot ==
Freshman Jameson "Jamie" Bartlett has three best friends named Connor (who has a crush on her), Lindsay, and Harmony, a brother named Lenny Bartlett, and a mean enemy named Sawyer Sullivan, whose boyfriend Marco Vega is the object of Jamie's affection. She also owns a tablet PC, on which she keeps a journal she writes in every day. In the journal, she writes about a character named "Isabella" or "Is", a popular girl with incredible powers who stands up to a mean girl named Myrna. In actuality, the journal is a more imaginative version of Jamie's life, with Is being loosely based on Jamie and Myrna being based on Sawyer.

For an English assignment, Jamie has to write an essay of her choice. Her printer dies, and Lenny refuses to let her use his. Lindsay offers to print the essay if Jamie emails it to her, but she accidentally sends her the journal. After Lindsay turns the journal in for Jamie, it wins a writing contest and is published as a book. Jamie's book attracts a lot of publicity, eventually becoming a bestseller. She appears at many book signings, on reality TV shows, is often interviewed, and meets stars whom she has always wanted to meet. Soon, success gets the better of Jamie; she becomes increasingly materialistic and critical of the world around her, quitting her job at her father's pizza place, ridiculing Lenny's guitar playing, and favoring fame over her friends. Her newfound popularity is dashed during a television interview where she inadvertently reveals that the antagonist of her novel is based on Sawyer and all of her other life dramas.

As Jamie's classmates learn that the book was based on Jamie's negative feelings toward her school, she wishes to restore her relationships. However, her friends are unwilling to trust her again and begin to reject and avoid her. To make up for her mistakes, she apologizes to Lenny, encouraging him to take up his guitar playing once more, despite what she'd said. Jamie overhears her parents' conversation about having to close down the pizza parlor, and Jamie feels guilty.

As she is getting ready for the ocean-themed school dance, Jamie confronts Is, a figment of her imagination who tries to make Jamie like she is, and tells her to stop. She then goes to the dance, where she tries to apologize to everyone. They do not accept her apology at first, but gradually do after learning the book was really Jamie's personal journal and that she never meant for it to be published. Jamie finds Connor just as he is leaving. She asks for his forgiveness and finds out that the poems Marco submits in their English class were actually written by Connor. Jamie realizes that her crush on Marco, which is largely because of the poems, is actually meant for Connor. They share a kiss and walk back into the dance, where Lenny performs a song ("I Will Be Around") dedicated to Jamie.

After the dance, Jamie invites everyone to eat at her parents' pizza parlor. When Lenny rushes into the kitchen to help cook the pizza, his jacket, which was covered in seaweed from the dance, accidentally lands on some of the pizzas, covering them in seaweed. When the pizza is delivered to the customers, they love it, and Jamie's father finally figures out the secret of how to save their business, ending the film on a happy note.

== Cast ==
- Kay Panabaker as Jameson "Jamie" Bartlett
- Danielle Panabaker as Isabella "IS"
- Jason Dolley as Connor Kennedy
- Robin Riker as Diana
- Tom Virtue as Ralph Bartlett
- Alexandra Krosney as Harmony
- Marquise C. Brown as Lindsay
- Allison Scagliotti as Sawyer "Myrna" Sullivan
- Chad Broskey as Marco Vega
- Connie Young as Peggy Bartlett
- Nick Whitaker as Lenny Bartlett
- Falisha Fehoko as Jennifer #1
- Malinda Money as Jennifer #2
- Joyce Cohen as Miss Gallagher
- Paisley Van Patten as Amber Tiffany

== Differences between the book and the movie ==
The movie was based on the book How My Private, Personal Journal Became a Bestseller. Julia DeVillers, the author of the book from which the movie was made, has a cameo in a pizza parlor scene. There are numerous differences between the book and the film. They are:

- In the book, Sawyer has long blond hair. In the movie, she has short brown hair.
- In the book, Harmony lives part-time in the city and part-time in the suburbs. In the movie, she lives in one place.
- In the book, Lindsay has light skin, red hair, and blue eyes. In the movie, she has dark skin, black hair, and brown eyes..
- In the book, Lindsay is constantly upset with her weight, but in the movie, this is never mentioned.
- In the book, Harmony has dark skin, black hair, and brown eyes. In the movie, she has light skin, green eyes, and red hair.
- In the book, Connor has brown hair. In the movie, he has blond hair.
- In the book, Connor is the new kid. In the movie, he is already friends with Jamie in the beginning.
- In the book, Jamie gets a laptop after she writes the book. In the movie, she uses her laptop to write her book.
- In the book, Jamie didn't kiss Connor but in the movie, she did.
- In the book, Jamie has an older sister named Allie, but in the movie, she has an older brother named Lenny. In the scène when Jamie was deleting friends off her list of online friends, one of their names was Allie.
- In the book, Jamie calls her story IS, but in the movie, she calls it IS Saves the World.
- In the movie, there was a school dance. In the book, there wasn't any dance.
- In the movie Jamie talks to IS. In the book, she doesn't.
- In the book, Jamie's parents are Steve and Robin. In the movie, their names are Ralph and Peggy.

== Location ==
Read It and Weep was filmed at Murray High School and Downtown Salt Lake City. Murray High School was also the set of: Take Down (1978), the auditorium scene of High School Musical (2006), Minutemen (2008) and High School Musical: Get in the Picture (2008).
