= Sonny with a Chance season 1 =

Sonny with a Chance
- Season 1
- The Sonny with a Chance season one cast
- No. of episodes: 21

Release
- Original network: Disney Channel
- Original release: February 8 – November 22, 2009

Season chronology
- Next → Season 2

The first season of the television series Sonny with a Chance aired on Disney Channel from February 8, 2009 to November 22, 2009, and included 21 episodes. It introduces the six main characters of the series which are Sonny Munroe (Demi Lovato), Tawni Hart (Tiffany Thornton), Chad Dylan Cooper (Sterling Knight), Nico Harris (Brandon Mychal Smith), Grady Mitchell (Doug Brochu), and Zora Lancaster (Allisyn Ashley Arm).

Recurring cast members and guest stars this season include Michael Kostroff, Nancy McKeon, Vicki Lewis, Kelly Blatz, Selena Gomez, Eden Sher, G. Hannelius, Daniel Roebuck, Steve Hytner, Robert Adamson, Christina Moore and Jeff Dunham.

== Production ==
Episode taping began on September 15, 2008 and ended on March 23, 2009. Episodes were taped on Stage 11 at NBC Studios in Burbank, California.

== Opening sequence ==
The opening sequence (which slides in from the top of the screen at the end of the teaser scene) begins with a shot of a ringing telephone, which Sonny picks up. After getting the call from Hollywood to appear on So Random! while running late, she screams into the phone, drops it and quickly packs a suitcase. The background suddenly changes from Sonny's bedroom to an airplane headed to California (though this portion contradicts a statement in the pilot episode by Sonny's mother Connie that they drove from Wisconsin to California). It continues by showing Sonny in L.A., then showing shots of the other characters (Tawni, who does a quick shine of a star with her picture on it; Chad looking out the window in the back of a limousine; Grady and Nico messing around; and Zora, atop of a mechanical monster machine she is controlling). The sequence ends with the entire cast walking together then stopping and posing, which then switches to Sonny walking next to the show's title logo where she knocks it into place, timed exactly while Sonny says "Yow!" just before the theme ends, in a manner similar to the end of the That's So Raven opening titles.

== Episodes ==
| No. overall | No. in season | Title | Directed by | Written by | Original release date | Prod. code | US viewers (millions) |
|---|---|---|---|---|---|---|---|
| 1 | 1 | "Sketchy Beginnings" | David Trainer | Michael Feldman & Steve Marmel | February 8, 2009 | 101 | 4.1 |
After a funny video she posted online goes viral, Wisconsin teenager Allison "Sonny" Munroe is offered a role as the newest cast member for her favorite TV show, a sketch comedy called So Random! Her first day on set, Sonny meets her fellow castmates - eccentric middle schooler Zora Lancaster; dim-witted, fun-loving best friend duo Nico Harris and Grady Mitchell; and high-strung, conceited diva Tawni Hart. Tawni finds Sonny's charisma and talent to be an imminent threat to her own spotlight, and the two struggle to get along. This inspires Sonny to create her very first sketch, in which she writes a rap venting her frustrations towards Tawni. So Random! sketches: "Dolphin Boy": Grady plays the main character, "Dolphin Boy", a high school student who is half-dolphin. Nico plays Dolphin Boy's friend and Tawni plays a cheerleader whom Dolphin Boy has a crush on. "One Bad Bee": Sonny writes this sketch. Sonny plays a rapping bee, Zora is the DJ, and Grady and Nico are backup dancers. Absent: Sterling Knight as Chad Dylan Cooper, as he wasn't introduced until the second episode which aired immediately after this episode.
| 2 | 2 | "West Coast Story" | David Trainer | Michael Feldman & Steve Marmel | February 8, 2009 | 104 | 4.0 |
Sonny meets Chad Dylan Cooper (Sterling Knight), "teen heartthrob" and star of popular drama series Mackenzie Falls, and is starstruck until she learns that Mackenzie Falls and So Random! have been rivals ever since Chad mocked So Random! in his acceptance speech at an awards show. Sonny decides to hold a peace picnic to dissolve the rivalry, but after this backfires, she challenges Mackenzie Falls to a Musical chairs competition, in which the losing show will have to say something nice about the winner. Chad ends up losing after Sonny fakes an injury, leading to him then complimenting her acting skills and inviting her to join Mackenzie Falls (which she declines). So Random! sketches: "Fasty's Really Fast Food": A restaurant-based sketch where the food items ordered and mentioned are thrown abruptly at the customers. Sonny and Tawni play customers, Grady plays a worker, and Nico plays the manager. "Madge the Waitress": This sketch is never seen, but Sonny is seen in costume as an overweight waitress named Madge with a Brooklyn accent. Guest star: Jillian Murray as Portlyn; Title reference: West Side Story
| 3 | 3 | "Sonny at the Falls" | Eric Dean Seaton | Phil Baker & Drew Vaupen | February 15, 2009 | 112 | 3.5 |
After hearing that Sonny has increased So Random!'s popularity, Chad devises a plan to steal Sonny from them. After Sonny's sketch idea is rejected by her castmates, she turns to Mackenzie Falls for comfort and support. In order to get Sonny back, the So Random! cast dress up as the characters from Sonny's rejected sketch. Sonny is so touched (and angry at Chad's admission that he was using her for ratings) that she joins the So Random! cast again. So Random! sketch: "Loser Force Five": A sketch Sonny wrote about four "pathetic" superheroes, originally titled "Loser Force Four" but updated after Sonny gave herself a role in the sketch. Guest stars: Jillian Murray as Portlyn and Wendy Worthington as Brenda
| 4 | 4 | "You've Got Fan Mail" | Philip Charles MacKenzie | Phil Baker & Drew Vaupen | February 22, 2009 | 107 | 3.7 |
Self conscious that she is the only So Random! cast member yet to receive a fan letter, Sonny writes herself her one pretending to be a boy named Eric. When the show's executive producer Marshall Pike invites "Eric" to meet Sonny, she has to pretend to be him to hide her lie. Sonny later discovers that Tawni has been secretly confiscating Sonny's fan mail, and Tawni, in turn, realizes that Eric is actually Sonny in disguise. In an attempt to expose Sonny, Tawni suggests to Marshall that Eric be brought out onstage after the live So Random! taping. Chad also finds out the truth about Eric, and dons the Eric disguise himself to meet Sonny onstage in order to protect her from being humiliated. Meanwhile, Nico and Grady try and intercept a package meant for Zora. So Random! sketches: "So You Think You Can PP Dance?": A parody of the reality show So You Think You Can Dance?, featuring contestants dancing while holding in a full bladder, which is made even harder by the fact that the host repeatedly makes double entendres related to urinating. Sonny plays the host while the other castmates play the contestants. "Baby Waa Waa": This sketch is not seen, but parts of it are mentioned. It is said that it involves Sonny, who plays the titular Baby Waa Waa, spitting up on the changing table while getting her diaper changed. Title reference: You've Got Mail Guest Stars: Brent Tarnol as Josh, the Mail Man. Other references: Sonny, dressed as Eric, paraphrases a line from the song "Blackbird" by The Beatles, by saying 'Time to take these broken wings and fly'.
| 5 | 5 | "Cheater Girls" | Eric Dean Seaton | Dava Savel | March 1, 2009 | 105 | 4.1 |
Sonny and Tawni are working on a new sketch called the "Check-It-Out Girls", which they're very excited about. But when Sonny's mother, Connie, finds out that Sonny is failing geometry, she threatens to pull her from the show unless she passes an upcoming test. Tawni encourages Sonny to cheat on the test, which she reluctantly agrees to, but later confesses to when the guilt becomes too much to bear. Marshall then bans the Check-It-Out Girls until both Tawni and Sonny retake and pass the test without cheating. Meanwhile, Nico and Grady buy a snake to impress a pretty girl on the set, but chaos abounds when the snake escapes. So Random! sketch: "Check It Out Girls": A sketch written by Sonny and Tawni, based in a grocery store where Tawni and Sonny play valley girls and use the phrase "Check out his/her..." to insult various people. Guest star: Michael Kostroff as Marshall, Vicki Lewis as Mrs. Bitterman; Absent: Sterling Knight as Chad Dylan Cooper; Title Reference: The Cheetah Girls
| 6 | 6 | "Three's Not Company" | Eric Dean Seaton | Amy Engelberg & Wendy Engelberg | March 8, 2009 | 106 | 3.8 |
Sonny is ecstatic when her best friend Lucy visits from Wisconsin, but starts to feel jealous when Tawni begins thwarting all their plans. Lucy later suggests that they attend Chad's birthday party, but Sonny, desperate for some alone time with her friend, lies and claims she was not invited. Tawni tells Lucy the truth and the two go to the party without Sonny. Sonny manages to sneak into the party (having been added to the blacklist after declining Chad's invitation) and make amends with Lucy. Meanwhile, Nico and Grady devise a plan to get revenge on the security guard, Murphy, who keeps stealing their pizza, but things go awry when Murphy lands in the hospital. So Random! sketches: "The Bully-Proof Backpack": A mock commercial marketing a school backpack equipped with "patented cartoon violence technology" to fight back against school bullies. Grady plays the pitchman, and Sonny plays the bully, with Tawni and Nico as the potential victims who use the backpacks. "The Hair Salon": This is a sketch based on a hair salon worker from Wisconsin. Guest stars: Eden Sher as Lucy, Steve Hytner as Murphy and Johari Johnson as Clipboard Girl; Absent: Allisyn Ashley Arm as Zora Lancaster; Title reference: Three's Company, the 1977–1983 American sitcom, which was based on the ITV sitcom Man About the House, starring Richard O'Sullivan
| 7 | 7 | "Poll'd Apart" | David Trainer | Amy Engelberg & Wendy Engelberg | March 15, 2009 | 110 | 4.0 |
Celebrity gossip blogger Sharona targets Tawni, causing the latter's self esteem to drop drastically. When her attempts to confront Sharona are to no avail, Sonny comes up with a Wizard of Oz themed sketch parodying Sharona, portraying her as the "Wicked Witch of the Web." Sharona is offended by this and threatens them if they show up to an upcoming the Oh, No You Di'nt awards show. The Randoms attend anyway, and get revenge on Sharona by wearing the same outfit as her. Meanwhile, Nico and Grady both try to persuade Chad to drive them to the awards ceremony in his new car by bribing him. So Random! sketch: "The Wicked Witch of the Web": A Wizard of Oz parody that makes fun of Sharona and hurts her feelings. Guest stars: Jillian Murray as Portlyn, Elisa Donovan as Sharona and Lily Holleman as Sharona's assistant, Monke
| 8 | 8 | "Fast Friends" | David Trainer | Michael Feldman & Steve Marmel | March 29, 2009 | 102 | 3.2 |
When Sonny is interviewed by Tween Weekly TV, Chad uses the interview to make himself look better. When Sonny realizes this, she angrily reprimands Chad and the cameras witness the interaction. The clip goes viral and Sonny develops a reputation as an "out of control diva." When Chad refuses to clear her name, she retaliates by catching him being a jerk via hidden camera. Chad admits that he is impressed, indicating an attraction between the two. Meanwhile, Nico and Grady sort through Tawni's trash to sell it online. So Random! sketch: "Granny Slam!": A fake wrestling match between grandmas played by Nico and Grady; Tawni plays the referee. Absent: Allisyn Ashley Arm as Zora Lancaster
| 9 | 9 | "Sonny with a Chance of Dating" | Eric Dean Seaton | Cindy Caponera | April 12, 2009 | 111 | 4.4 |
Sonny is asked out by Mackenzie Falls guest star James Conroy (Kelly Blatz), leading both Tawni (who is James' ex-girlfriend) and Chad (who is developing a crush on Sonny) to become jealous. After his date with Sonny, James' feelings for Tawni resurface and he asks her out instead, leaving Sonny heartbroken. Sonny then convinces Chad to go on a fake date with her to make James jealous, even going as far as to pretend to kiss Chad. James asks for Sonny back, but is dumped by both girls. Meanwhile, Nico and Grady are banned from the cafeteria by security guard Murphy, so Zora offers to be their lawyer, with unsuccessful results. So Random! sketch: "Sally Jenson: Kid Lawyer": Zora mentions this character she played a couple of times when trying to convince Nico and Grady to make her their lawyer. "Life of the Boston Tea Party": Chad guesses this right before James asks Sonny out. In this sketch, Sonny is a tea pot. Mackenzie Falls episode: :"Christmas Episode" – Chad mentioned this episode is the one James Conroy guest-stars in. In the end, he realizes he had a wonderful life. This is a reference to the 1946 film It's a Wonderful Life.
| 10 | 10 | "Sonny and the Studio Brat" | Eric Dean Seaton | Amy Engelberg & Wendy Engelberg | April 26, 2009 | 114 | N/A |
Sonny gives a studio tour to an underprivileged girl named Dakota (G. Hannelius) who claims to be from the Children Having A Dream Foundation. It is eventually revealed that Dakota is a stuck-up, stubborn brat who is actually the daughter of the studio's owner, Mr. Condor, and faked the Children Having A Dream foundation so she could meet Chad, as she is not allowed to watch Mackenzie Falls due to being younger than the show's target age demographic. Sonny eventually caves and brings Dakota to "The Basement," a fake nightclub created by Tawni, so she can meet Chad. Mr. Condor arrives and is furious with Sonny for having brought Dakota to a nightclub, as well as Chad for having yelled at Dakota. The club is then revealed to all its attendees to be fake, and Chad has to recompense for his actions by following all of Dakota's orders for a day. So Random! sketch: "The Basement": Nico mentions it when Tawni says they will use the set to pretend that they were invited to a hot, teen club opening. "Cheese Pants": There is a picture of Nico and Grady wearing cheese pants and Nico says it's from a sketch. Note: "Gnomy the Gnome" was broken by Dakota in this episode but reappeared in "Tales from the House" when Chad said "Start with the gnome." He continued to appear in all other episodes. Demi Lovato's sister, Dallas Lovato, appears as the actress dancing with Nico.
| 11 | 11 | "Promises, Prom-misses" | David Trainer | Dava Savel | May 3, 2009 | 109 | 4.1 |
Upset about missing her prom back home in Wisconsin, she asks Marshall if Condor Studios can hold their own prom. When he refuses, the Randoms distract him so they can throw the prom in secret. Unfortunately, Sonny is too caught up in making sure everything goes smoothly to actually enjoy the prom herself. The cast are almost caught by Marshall, but they cover it up by claiming they are practicing for a prom sketch. Impressed by their hard work, Marshall changes his mind and allows them to hold a real prom as a reward. While Sonny is alone and lamenting the fact that she missed her first prom, she is found by Chad, who offers to slow dance with her. So Random! sketches: "The Prom": Marshall guesses that Sonny is thinking of doing a prom sketch when he sees her twirling around in a pretty dress. Sonny and the rest of the cast later actually think of doing a prom sketch. "Princess Girl": This is the dress Sonny wears that angers Tawni. "Mermaid Girl": This is the dress Sonny wears to keep Tawni happy.
| 12 | 12 | "The Heartbreak Kids" | Eric Dean Seaton | Cindy Caponera | May 17, 2009 | 103 | 3.4 |
Seeing that they are both lonely, Sonny sets up Marshall with the Randoms' teacher, Ms. Bitterman (Vicki Lewis). The couple are happy together, much to the Randoms' delight, but things take a turn for the worse when Ms. Bitterman begins changing existing So Random! skits and replacing them with unfunny ones, which Marshall, blinded by his affection for her, gladly allows her to do. Sonny enlists Chad's help to break up Marshall and Ms. Bitterman. Chad instructs Nico to scare the two in a Bigfoot costume (inspired by a Mackenzie Falls episode) but the incident just brings Marshall and Ms. Bitterman closer. Sonny then realizes she was wrong to meddle in their relationship and decides to leave them be. So Random! sketches: "Scotland's Top Model": This is the sketch where Sonny, Tawni, Nico are dressed up in kilts and Grady is the announcer. Mackenzie Falls episode "Episode 319 – Bigfoot Gets the Girl" – This is the episode Chad, Nico, and Grady use to break Marshall and Ms. Bitterman up. In this episode, Bigfoot wants this girl, and he scares her boyfriend away to get her. Note: Ms. Bitterman says Davenport, the last name that is used in the Disney XD show Lab Rats. Absent: Allisyn Ashley Arm as Zora Lancaster
| 13 | 13 | "Battle of the Networks' Stars" | Eric Dean Seaton | Michael Feldman & Steve Marmel | June 7, 2009 | 116 | 4.0 |
Chad is making an autobiographical movie about his life and hires actress Selena Gomez to play the role of Sonny. However, problems arise when Gomez detects the romantic tension between Sonny and Chad and tries to get them to admit their feelings for one another. This culminates in Gomez storming off set and quitting the movie after she gets fed up with Sonny and Chad's constant arguing, though not before she manages to get the two to allude to having crushes on one another. Eventually, Chad agrees to let Sonny play the role of herself. Meanwhile, Nico and Grady meet a pair of actors who look identical to them, but somehow have much better luck with girls, and enlist their doppelgängers' help in picking up women. So Random! sketches: "Gassie the Toot'n Pooch": A sketch following the adventures of a dog who communicates by farting. Also: "Chad Dylan Cooper: The Chad Dylan Cooper Story" – A movie about Chad's life. Directed by Chad, stars Chad, Sonny, Tawni, Nico, and Grady. "Camp Hip Hop": Selena plays a character similar to Mitchie in Camp Rock, who was played by Demi Lovato. Absent: Allisyn Ashley Arm as Zora Lancaster; Special Guest Star: Selena Gomez References made: Camp Rock, Mitchie Torres (from Camp Rock), Jonas Brothers, Robert Feggans, Harry Potter, Wizards of Waverly Place, Lassie, Hannah Montana. Also referenced is Lovato's friendship with Gomez. Note: In the end, Chad tells Sonny and her friends that his movie is on, but it appears to be the same day because they are all wearing the same clothing. Which is strange, because Chad tells Sonny that they will start the next day.
| 14 | 14 | "Prank'd" | Carl Lauten | Kevin Kopelow & Heath Seifert | July 5, 2009 | 115 | 5.2 |
Chad becomes the new host of a reality TV series, Celebrity Practical Jok’d, in which he plays pranks on unsuspecting celebrities, leading the Randoms to become constantly anxious that they will be his next target. When Chad sets up an audition for Sonny for the role of her favorite superhero Fashionita, she grows suspicious that it’s a prank for his show and sabotages the audition on purpose. At the end of the episode, the show is revealed to have been an elaborate prank orchestrated by Zora, the real host of Celebrity Practical Jok’d, for which the first step was leading Chad to believe he was the host of the show. The prank concludes with Chad being glued to the floor and forced to watch in horror as his convertible is filled with elephant manure while the Randoms look along and laugh. So Random! sketches: "Gassie the Toot 'n Pooch": A sketch following the adventures of a dog who speaks by farting. In this sketch the mayor visits. Also: "Fashionita": The movie that Sonny and Tawni both want to audition for, but in the end it turned out to be a prank audition. "Celebrity Practical Jok'd": The show Zora is the host of, but pranks Chad into thinking he's the host. "Young Lincoln": The one man show the casting director mentions he is a part of. Guest star: Andrew Abelson as Director; Note: This was one of the episodes that were on unlocked on DisneyChannel.com by counting how many times they say "princess" (or variations of the word) during the presentation of Princess Protection Program; Title Reference: Punk'd
| 15 | 15 | "Tales from the Prop House" | Eric Dean Seaton | Dava Savel | August 2, 2009 | 117 | 4.0 |
The So Random! finds out that they are being evicted from the prop house, which will subsequently become Mackenzie Falls meditation room. The Randoms fight for their prop house back and eventually succeed, while Chad buys them all gifts to apologize, admitting that he didn't realize how much the prop house meant to them. So Random! sketches: "Dolphin Boy (from Episode 1)": The story of "Dolphin Boy" who is half-dolphin and half-boy. "Annoying Girl": A girl who always annoys the people around her. "Check It Out Girls: First Fight": A continuation of the "Check It Out Girls" sketch where they get into the first argument. Guest Star: Jillian Murray as Portlyn
| 16 | 16 | "Sonny in the Kitchen with Dinner" | Linda Mendoza | Danny Warren | August 16, 2009 | 118 | N/A |
Tawni has a crush on the new Condor Studios intern, Hayden, but enlists Sonny's help in talking to him as she is unused to dating men who aren't wealthy or don't have a celebrity status. Sonny gets the three of them tickets to a Lakers game, but during the game, she and Hayden are caught by the "kiss cam" and pressured into kissing by the audience. This upsets Tawni, but Sonny promises to make it up to her by setting up another date with Hayden. She later finds out that Hayden's ideal type is the exact opposite of Tawni's Hollywood upbringing, but Tawni comes up with the idea to bring Hayden to Sonny's apartment and claim that it's hers, as well as providing him with a "home cooked meal" prepared by Sonny. Meanwhile, Nico and Grady are jealous that Chad has a sandwich on the cafeteria menu named after him, and try to make a sandwich that will impress the cafeteria staff enough to name it after them. Absent: Allisyn Ashley Arm as Zora Lancaster; Guest stars: Robert Adamson as Hayden, Lanny Horn as Howie, Max Williger as Delivery Guy; Notes: This is the first episode not to feature or make reference of a So Random! sketch. On the other hand, this was Demi Lovato's first on-screen kiss. Also, Sonny's family name is Munroe, but it is misspelled on Chad's cell phone because the "U" in Munroe is an "O". References: There's someone who resembles Jack Nicholson at the Lakers game, a reference to the well-known actor, who is a fan of the Los Angeles Lakers. "Blarmie" is a spoof of a real-life blanket with sleeves called "Snuggie". Title reference: Someone's in the Kitchen with Dinah (a line from the song: "I've Been Working on the Railroad")
| 17 | 17 | "Guess Who's Coming to Guest Star" "Sonny with a Chad (alternative)" | Eric Dean Seaton | Michael Feldman & Steve Marmel | September 27, 2009 | 108 | 4.1 |
Chad is guest starring on So Random! and, much to Sonny's horror, the two will be acting in a sketch together in which they will have to share a kiss. Chad proclaims that by the end of the week, Sonny will have fallen in love with Chad, as all of his previous female co-stars have. Sonny desperately tries to avoid looking into his eyes to prevent this from happening. Meanwhile, Marshall allows Chad to use Nico and Grady's dressing room for the week, and allows the two to use his office in exchange. However, the two end up abusing their privileges as the new "heads" of So Random!. So Random! sketch: "Hot E.M.T": Sonny plays a girl who pretends to get hurt so she can see the paramedic played by Chad Dylan Cooper. They are supposed to kiss but just before they do a pig falls into Sonny's lap and she lets the pig kiss Chad instead. Also: "The Goody Gang": The show Tawni and Chad were on when they were young. Absent: Allisyn Ashley Arm as Zora Lancaster; Guest stars: David Magidoff as Dave (the assistant), Paul Butler as Young Chad, True Bella as Young Tawni. Title reference: Guess Who's Coming to Dinner; Note: This episode premiered on Disney Channel Latin America on August 8. This episode was also known as Sonny With a Chad in its promo.
| 18 | 18 | "Hart to Hart" "Who's the Dummy? (Alternative)" | Eric Dean Seaton | Lanny Horn & Josh Silverstein | November 1, 2009 | 119 | 4.1 |
Tawni's overbearing manager forces her to do a "dumb blonde" sketch, which Sonny worries is offensive to women and blondes. She convinces Tawni to fire her manager, but as it turns out, Tawni's manager is also her mother. Tawni stays at Sonny's apartment until Sonny manages to get the two to make up. Meanwhile, Nico and Grady try to get past the new security guard Jeff's ventriloquist dummy Walter (who appears to have a mind of his own) so they can use Chad's private bathroom. Absent: Allisyn Ashley Arm as Zora Lancaster; Guest stars: Christina Moore as Tammi Hart and Jeff Dunham as Jeff and Walter Note: This episode was also known as Who's the Dummy? in its promo.
| 19 | 19 | "Sonny in the Middle" | Eric Dean Seaton | Lanny Horn & Josh Silverstein | November 8, 2009 (Note: This episode can be seen on the DVD, "Sonny's Big Break" was released on August 25, 2009, as a bonus feature and was also recorded to show on online flights with Delta Air Lines. This episode premiered in Disney Channel India on November 6, 2009.) | 113 | 3.3 |
Sonny gives Nico and Grady a video game chair for their birthday, which ends in disaster when the two end up fighting over it and end up declaring that they are no longer friends, subsequently trying to hang out with Sonny instead of each other. By the end of the episode, they make up. Meanwhile, Zora manipulates her co-stars into taking her to do various activities. So Random! sketches: "Garry and Larry": Nico and Grady play two friends who have their own talk show in their basement. Also, the set of "Garry and Larry" was also the set for "The Basement" in "Sonny and the Studio Brat". Guest star: Lanny Horn as Howie; References: Four Weddings and a Funeral and The Sisterhood of the Traveling Pants, are referenced as spoofed films.
| 20 | 20 | "Cookie Monsters" | Eric Dean Seaton | Story by : Cindy Caponera; Teleplay by : Kevin Kopelow & Heath Seifert | November 15, 2009 | 120 | N/A |
Zora wants to break the record for the most Blossom Scout cookies sold, which Sonny enthusiastically helps her with, as she too had been a Blossom Scout when she was younger but failed to earn all of her badges due to failing to pass the CPR test. However, Dakota learns of Zora's plans and tries to foil them out of spite by also becoming a Blossom Scout and trying to break the record, enlisting Chad's help in selling cookies. By the end of the episode, the girls have tied, and one unsold box of cookies remains. When both Dakota and Sonny try goading Chad into giving them the cookies, he panics and eats the whole box, subsequently choking until Sonny performs the Heimlich maneuver on him. Disavowed with the manipulative and deceitful behavior displayed by Dakota, Blossom Scout leader Mrs. Montecore exiles her from the Blossom Scouts and declares Zora to be the record breaker, as well as granting Sonny her Blossom Scout title due to having successfully saved Chad. Meanwhile, Nico and Grady create their own cologne to impress girls, and Tawni becomes a more generous and kind person when she stops looking at mirrors for two days after Zora bet her she couldn't. Title reference: Cookie Monster from Sesame Street Guest stars: Patricia Bethune as Mrs. Montecore, Madison de la Garza as eight-year-old Sonny (in flashbacks). Note: Madison de la Garza is Demi Lovato's younger sister.
| 21 | 21 | "Sonny: So Far" | Eric Dean Seaton | Michael Feldman & Steve Marmel | November 22, 2009 | 121 | 3.8 |
Sonny and Tawni make an appearance on the talk show Gotcha! with Gilroy Smith, and are excited until they realize that the eponymous Gilroy is famous for exposing and humiliating his guests. The situation worsens when Chad joins them, and Gilroy alerts the audience to the growing romantic tension between Chad and Sonny. Absent: Brandon Mychal Smith as Nico Harris, Doug Brochu as Grady Mitchel and Allisyn Ashley Arm as Zora Lancaster; Guest star: Eric Toms as Gilroy Smith Note: Although not in the episode, Nico Harris, Grady Mitchel and Zora Lancaster were shown in clips from previous episodes. This is the first Sonny with a Chance episode that included bloopers at the end of the episode.
