= List of Sonny with a Chance episodes =

Sonny with a Chance is an American sitcom created by Steve Marmel for Disney Channel Original Series. It aired from February 8, 2009 to January 2, 2011.

The series revolves around Sonny Munroe (Demi Lovato), a teenage comedian who wins the chance of starring in the fictional children's sketch comedy series, So Random!. She is assisted by fellow cast members and new friends Tawni Hart (Tiffany Thornton), Nico Harris (Brandon Mychal Smith), Grady Mitchell (Doug Brochu) and Zora Lancaster (Allisyn Ashley Arm), along with Chad Dylan Cooper (Sterling Knight), the star of Mackenzie Falls, the rival tween TV show of So Random!.

== Series overview ==
| Season | Episodes | Originally released | |
| Season | Episodes | First released | Last released |
|---|---|---|---|
| 1 | 21 | February 8, 2009 | November 22, 2009 |
| 2 | 26 | March 14, 2010 | January 2, 2011 |

== Episodes ==
=== Season 1 (2009) ===
| No. overall | No. in season | Title | Directed by | Written by | Original release date | Prod. code | US viewers (millions) |
|---|---|---|---|---|---|---|---|
| 1 | 1 | "Sketchy Beginnings" | David Trainer | Michael Feldman & Steve Marmel | February 8, 2009 | 101 | 4.1 |
| 2 | 2 | "West Coast Story" | David Trainer | Michael Feldman & Steve Marmel | February 8, 2009 | 104 | 4.0 |
| 3 | 3 | "Sonny at the Falls" | Eric Dean Seaton | Phil Baker & Drew Vaupen | February 15, 2009 | 112 | 3.5 |
| 4 | 4 | "You've Got Fan Mail" | Philip Charles MacKenzie | Phil Baker & Drew Vaupen | February 22, 2009 | 107 | 3.7 |
| 5 | 5 | "Cheater Girls" | Eric Dean Seaton | Dava Savel | March 1, 2009 | 105 | 4.1 |
| 6 | 6 | "Three's Not Company" | Eric Dean Seaton | Amy Engelberg & Wendy Engelberg | March 8, 2009 | 106 | 3.8 |
| 7 | 7 | "Poll'd Apart" | David Trainer | Amy Engelberg & Wendy Engelberg | March 15, 2009 | 110 | 4.0 |
| 8 | 8 | "Fast Friends" | David Trainer | Michael Feldman & Steve Marmel | March 29, 2009 | 102 | 3.2 |
| 9 | 9 | "Sonny with a Chance of Dating" | Eric Dean Seaton | Cindy Caponera | April 12, 2009 | 111 | 4.4 |
| 10 | 10 | "Sonny and the Studio Brat" | Eric Dean Seaton | Amy Engelberg & Wendy Engelberg | April 26, 2009 | 114 | N/A |
| 11 | 11 | "Promises, Prom-misses" | David Trainer | Dava Savel | May 3, 2009 | 109 | 4.1 |
| 12 | 12 | "The Heartbreak Kids" | Eric Dean Seaton | Cindy Caponera | May 17, 2009 | 103 | 3.4 |
| 13 | 13 | "Battle of the Networks' Stars" | Eric Dean Seaton | Michael Feldman & Steve Marmel | June 7, 2009 | 116 | 4.0 |
| 14 | 14 | "Prank'd" | Carl Lauten | Kevin Kopelow & Heath Seifert | July 5, 2009 | 115 | 5.2 |
| 15 | 15 | "Tales from the Prop House" | Eric Dean Seaton | Dava Savel | August 2, 2009 | 117 | 4.0 |
| 16 | 16 | "Sonny in the Kitchen with Dinner" | Linda Mendoza | Danny Warren | August 16, 2009 | 118 | N/A |
| 17 | 17 | "Guess Who's Coming to Guest Star" "Sonny with a Chad (alternative)" | Eric Dean Seaton | Michael Feldman & Steve Marmel | September 27, 2009 | 108 | 4.1 |
| 18 | 18 | "Hart to Hart" "Who's the Dummy? (Alternative)" | Eric Dean Seaton | Lanny Horn & Josh Silverstein | November 1, 2009 | 119 | 4.1 |
| 19 | 19 | "Sonny in the Middle" | Eric Dean Seaton | Lanny Horn & Josh Silverstein | November 8, 2009 (Note: This episode can be seen on the DVD, "Sonny's Big Break" was released on August 25, 2009, as a bonus feature and was also recorded to show on online flights with Delta Air Lines. This episode premiered in Disney Channel India on November 6, 2009.) | 113 | 3.3 |
| 20 | 20 | "Cookie Monsters" | Eric Dean Seaton | Story by : Cindy Caponera; Teleplay by : Kevin Kopelow & Heath Seifert | November 15, 2009 | 120 | N/A |
| 21 | 21 | "Sonny: So Far" | Eric Dean Seaton | Michael Feldman & Steve Marmel | November 22, 2009 | 121 | 3.8 |

=== Season 2 (2010–11) ===
| No. overall | No. in season | Title | Directed by | Written by | Original release date | Prod. code | US viewers (millions) |
|---|---|---|---|---|---|---|---|
| 22 | 1 | "Walk a Mile in My Pants" | Eric Dean Seaton | Amy Engelberg & Wendy Engelberg | March 14, 2010 | 202 | 6.3 |
| 23 | 2 | "Sonny Get Your Goat" | Eric Dean Seaton | Dava Savel | March 21, 2010 | 204 | 3.2 |
| 24 | 3 | "Gassie Passes" | Eric Dean Seaton | Dava Savel | March 28, 2010 | 205 | N/A |
| 25 | 4 | "Sonny with a Song" | John Fortenberry | Michael Feldman & Steve Marmel | April 11, 2010 | 209 | 3.2 |
| 26 | 5 | "High School Miserable" | Carl Lauten | Michael Feldman & Steve Marmel | April 18, 2010 | 206 | N/A |
| 27 | 6 | "The Legend of Candy Face" | Eric Dean Seaton | Dan Cohen & F.J. Pratt | May 2, 2010 | 203 | 3.5 |
| 28 | 7 | "Gummy with a Chance" | Carl Lauten | Josh Herman & Adam Schwartz | May 9, 2010 | 207 | 3.4 |
| 29 | 8 | "Random Acts of Disrespect" | Leslie Kolins Small | Dan Cohen & F.J. Pratt | May 16, 2010 | 208 | N/A |
| 30 | 9 | "Grady with a Chance of Sonny" | Eric Dean Seaton | Lanny Horn & Josh Silverstein | May 23, 2010 | 216 | N/A |
| 31 | 10 | "Falling for the Falls" (Part 1) | Eric Dean Seaton | Michael Feldman & Steve Marmel | June 13, 2010 | 201 | 3.6 |
| 32 | 11 | "Falling for the Falls" (Part 2) | Eric Dean Seaton | Michael Feldman & Steve Marmel | June 20, 2010 | 217 | 3.8 |
| 33–34 | 12–13 | "Sonny with a Secret" | Eric Dean Seaton | Michael Feldman & Steve Marmel | July 18, 2010 | 212–213 | 6.1 |
| 35 | 14 | "The Problem with Pauly" | Shelley Jensen | Josh Herman & Adam Schwartz | August 8, 2010 | 214 | 4.5 |
| 36 | 15 | "That's So Sonny" | Eric Dean Seaton | Dava Savel | August 29, 2010 | 215 | 4.0 |
| 37 | 16 | "Chad Without a Chance" | Eric Dean Seaton | Amy Engelberg & Wendy Engelberg | September 19, 2010 | 210 | 4.0 |
| 38 | 17 | "My Two Chads" | Eric Dean Seaton | Dan Cohen & F.J. Pratt | September 26, 2010 | 211 | 4.0 |
| 39 | 18 | "A So Random! Halloween Special" | Eric Dean Seaton | Josh Herman & Adam Schwartz | October 17, 2010 | 226 | 4.0 |
| 40 | 19 | "Sonny with a 100% Chance of Meddling" | Ron Moseley | Lanny Horn & Josh Silverstein | October 24, 2010 | 219 | 2.83 |
| 41 | 20 | "Dakota's Revenge" | Eric Dean Seaton | Dava Savel | November 14, 2010 | 223 | 3.7 |
| 42 | 21 | "Sonny with a Kiss" | Eric Dean Seaton | Ellen Byron & Lissa Kapstrom | November 21, 2010 | 220 | 3.6 |
| 43 | 22 | "A So Random! Holiday Special" | Eric Dean Seaton | Michael Feldman & Steve Marmel | November 28, 2010 | 218 | 3.8 |
| 44 | 23 | "Sonny with a Grant" | Eric Dean Seaton | Michael Feldman & Steve Marmel | December 5, 2010 | 221 | 4.0 |
| 45 | 24 | "Marshall with a Chance" | Shannon Flynn | Carla Banks Waddles | December 12, 2010 | 224 | 3.2 |
| 46 | 25 | "Sonny with a Choice" | Eric Dean Seaton | Dan Cohen & F.J. Pratt | December 19, 2010 | 222 | 3.6 |
| 47 | 26 | "New Girl" | Sean McNamara | Michael Feldman & Steve Marmel | January 2, 2011 | 225 | 3.71 |

== See also ==
- So Random!
- List of So Random! episodes
