= Sonny with a Chance season 2 =

Sonny with a Chance
- Season 2
- The Sonny with a Chance season two cast
- No. of episodes: 26

Release
- Original network: Disney Channel
- Original release: March 14, 2010 – January 2, 2011

Season chronology
- ← Previous; Season 1

The second and final season of the television series Sonny with a Chance aired on Disney Channel from March 14, 2010 to January 2, 2011. The six main characters are Sonny Munroe (Demi Lovato), Tawni Hart (Tiffany Thornton), Chad Dylan Cooper (Sterling Knight), Nico Harris (Brandon Mychal Smith), Grady Mitchell (Doug Brochu), and Zora Lancaster (Allisyn Ashley Arm).

Recurring cast members and guest stars this season include Michael Kostroff, Nancy McKeon, Vicki Lewis, G. Hannelius, Estelle Harris, Carol Locatell, Larry Gelman, Lou Ferrigno, Shaquille O'Neal, Allstar Weekend, Joe Jonas and Raven-Symoné.

== Production ==
Disney Channel renewed Sonny for a second season on June 1, 2009, alongside the fourth season of Hannah Montana. Production for the series moved from NBC Studios in Burbank, California to Hollywood Center Studios in Hollywood, California. Episodes were taped from November 2, 2009 and ended on June 4, 2010.

=== Opening sequence ===
The opening sequence for season two remains virtually the same, with only the portion where Sonny knocks the title logo into place being reshot.

== Episodes ==
No. overall	No. in season	Title	Directed by	Written by	Original release date	Prod. code	US viewers (millions)
22	1	"Walk a Mile in My Pants"	Eric Dean Seaton	Amy Engelberg & Wendy Engelberg	March 14, 2010	202	6.3
Sonny is hosting a Walk-a-Thon For Books where all participants will be wearing Tawni's Extreme Skinny Jeans, although Sonny and the rest of So Random! have trouble walking in them. Chad finds out about the event and decides to host his own Walk-a-Thon Against Books where all the participants will also be wearing Tawni's Extreme Skinny Jeans. The next day, Tawni becomes incapacitated and is sent to hospital, where she is diagnosed with Skinny Pants Syndrome (SPS), a condition affecting blood circulation and hindering the ability to walk. During both "Walk-A-Thon" events, both teams also become afflicted with SPS and have to have their pants removed. After Tawni learns that her fans are suffering SPS because of her, she and the Randoms (along with Chad) make a charity song called "Stop SPS" in order to fight against SPS. So Random! sketches: "Sicky Vicky": Sonny plays Vicky, a sick girl who hosts a TV show from her bed giving tips about fun things to do when you are sick. Untitled Hula Sketch: The cast rehearses a hula sketch. "Stop SPS": The casts of So Random! and Mackenzie Falls unite to film the music video to stop Skinny Pants Syndrome. Absent: Allisyn Ashley Arm as Zora Note: On this episode's first broadcast, the 16:9 widescreen picture seen on Disney Channel HD was mistakenly compressed into the 4:3 center cut picture on Disney Channel's SD feed; the rebroadcast on March 21, 2010 corrected this. This is the first episode broadcast that was taped at Hollywood Center Studios, joining Wizards of Waverly Place, The Suite Life on Deck and Jonas at the lot; the first season was shot at NBC Studios in Burbank. The series' record breaking season premiere was led in by the season three finale for Hannah Montana, which topped the week with 7.6 million viewers.
23	2	"Sonny Get Your Goat"	Eric Dean Seaton	Dava Savel	March 21, 2010	204	3.2
After the "Check-it-Out Girls" sketch becomes popular in the foreign country of Glendovia, Sonny and Tawni are invited to attend a red carpet event there. However, they refuse to go together following an argument which supposedly involves which Check-it-out Girl is better than the other. Tawni goes alone, but is shocked to discover that it is a cultural wasteland and that the Glendovians think the "Check-it-Out Girls" are real and not just characters. Meanwhile, Nico and Grady don fake mustaches in an attempt to impress a girl. So Random! sketch: "The Check-it-out Girls": A popular sketch which was a recurring segment in Season 1. Guest Stars: Michael Kostroff as Marshall, Sam Lerner as Dinka Absent: Allisyn Ashley Arm as Zora Title Reference: Annie Get Your Gun
24	3	"Gassie Passes"	Eric Dean Seaton	Dava Savel	March 28, 2010	205	N/A
Feeling that Gassie doesn't get the affection that he deserves from his trainer, Sonny takes it upon herself to take proper care of him. Sonny then finds out that playing with Gassie affects his ability to flatulate on command while filming the "Gassie" sketches, thus jeopardizing the upcoming feature film "Gassie and We." In trying to retrain him, Sonny gives Gassie too many dog treats, causing him to go into shock, much to the horror of the Randoms, who assume he has died. Meanwhile, Nico and Grady borrow money from Dakota to invest in fart noise lunch boxes to promote "Gassie and We." So Random! sketch: "Gassie the Toot'n Pooch" Guest star: Siobhan Fallon Hogan as Bella, Gassie's trainer
25	4	"Sonny with a Song"	John Fortenberry	Michael Feldman & Steve Marmel	April 11, 2010	209	3.2
Sonny’s favorite musician, Trey Brothers, is visiting So Random! as the show's first ever musical guest. Sonny reveals that she has been secretly writing songs, and wants to present her most recent one to Trey. A jealous Tawni finds herself attracted to Trey, and in an attempt to impress him, she passes Sonny's song off as her own. However, both their plans backfire when Trey claims that he wrote the song. Meanwhile, Nico and Grady try to figure out how to work a magic box. Guest star: Guy Burnet as Trey Brothers Absent: Allisyn Ashley Arm as Zora Songs featured: "Me, Myself and Time" Note: This episode is Sonny's first time performing a song.
26	5	"High School Miserable"	Carl Lauten	Michael Feldman & Steve Marmel	April 18, 2010	206	N/A
The So Random! cast write a letter to Mr. Condor expressing their dissatisfaction with their studio perks (or lack thereof). Offended by this, Mr. Condor fires the cast and hires his daughter Dakota as the one and only star of So Random!, forcing the Randoms to attend public high school. By the end of the episode, this is revealed to have been a dream sequence, and the Randoms decide to remain grateful for what they have in lieu of demanding more. Title reference: High School Musical So Random! sketches: "The Real Princesses of New Jersey": A parody of both The Real Housewives of New Jersey reality-show and the Disney Princess franchise, performed by Sonny (Snow-White/"Snowy"), Tawni (Cinderella/"Cindy"), Zora (Sleeping-Beauty/"Beauty"), and Grady (the Magic Mirror).; "Sally Jenson: Kid Lawyer": The cast rehearses this sketch, with Dakota later replacing Zora.; "Rappin' Pirate": A sketch mentioned by the other cast members, normally performed by Nico, later replaced by Dakota.; Guest star: E. E. Bell as Principal
27	6	"The Legend of Candy Face"	Eric Dean Seaton	Dan Cohen & F.J. Pratt	May 2, 2010	203	3.5
Ms. Bitterman takes the respective casts of So Random! and Mackenzie Falls on a retreat to the woods in attempt to build trust between the two groups. While there, she tells them the legend of "Candyface," a disfigured murderer who dwells in the woods. When mysterious happenings occur and personal items are found broken, both casts are convinced that "Candyface" is responsible. However, they discover that it was actually Sonny who committed the acts while sleepwalking, though she is touched that the two shows were able to overcome their differences in order to defend themselves against "Candyface." So Random! sketch: "Mackenzie Stalls": The cast of So Random! parody Mackenzie Falls, but instead of the setting being by a waterfall, the setting of the sketch is in a school bathroom. Guest stars: Vicki Lewis as Mrs. Bitterman, William Jonathan Georges as Devon, Leslie-Anne Huff as Penelope, Ashley Jackson as Chloe and DeVaughn Nixon as Trevor Note: Chad's hair is short in the beginning, but after the theme, it's long again. Ms. Bitterman makes a joke about a guy named Bernie who "made off" with her money, referencing Bernie Madoff's Ponzi scheme scandal of 2008.
28	7	"Gummy with a Chance"	Carl Lauten	Josh Herman & Adam Schwartz	May 9, 2010	207	3.4
Sonny's ritual of chewing gum before every show is disrupted when gum is banned from the studio, causing her to start doubting her abilities as a comedian. Meanwhile, Chad invites Nico and Grady to exercise in his personal gym as a ploy to power his new "green" dressing room. So Random! sketches: "Sicky Vicky" and "Toe-nail Fairy" (played by Tawni)
29	8	"Random Acts of Disrespect"	Leslie Kolins Small	Dan Cohen & F.J. Pratt	May 16, 2010	208	N/A
When an elderly woman named Grace wins the "Be So Random! for a Day" contest, the Randoms create a sketch ridiculing senior citizens that not only offends Grace and her entire retirement home, but all elderly people. Grace and her friends turn the tables and play a practical joke on the cast. Meanwhile, Chad attempts to help a group of kids overcome their fear of clowns. References: During one sketch, other Disney Channel shows are directly referenced, including That's So Raven, Wizards of Waverly Place, and Hannah Montana.; The end-credits sequence features parodies of routines from The Benny Hill Show (the "Yakety Sax" chase-sequences, and patting Jackie Wright's bald head), and Rowan & Martin's Laugh-In (Arte Johnson's "man on a tricycle").; Guest stars: Estelle Harris as Grace Gallagher, Carol Locatell as Edith and Larry Gelman as Buddy Absent: Allisyn Ashley Arm as Zora
30	9	"Grady with a Chance of Sonny"	Eric Dean Seaton	Lanny Horn & Josh Silverstein	May 23, 2010	216	N/A
Sonny offers to pretend to be Grady's girlfriend after his brother, Grant, teases him for being single. Problems arise when she tries to maintain a cover, and go out on a date. Meanwhile, Tawni teams up with Nico to pull a prank on Chad just before he gets ready to shoot a commercial for his self-titled energy bar. Guest star: Preston Jones as Grant Mitchell Absent: Allisyn Ashley Arm as Zora
31	10	"Falling for the Falls" (Part 1)	Eric Dean Seaton	Michael Feldman & Steve Marmel	June 13, 2010	201	3.6
After becoming secretly hooked on Mackenzie Falls, Sonny confronts Chad to find out what happens between Mackenzie and Chloe in the series finale. Chad misunderstands Sonny's intentions and asks her out, which she accepts, though is reluctant to tell the Randoms. Meanwhile, Grady and Nico try to find a way to get Sonny to do their astronomy project for them.
32	11	"Falling for the Falls" (Part 2)	Eric Dean Seaton	Michael Feldman & Steve Marmel	June 20, 2010	217	3.8
While on his first date with Sonny, Chad is so nervous that he vomits water on her. The incident is photographed and posted on the cover of Tween Weekly, and a humiliated Chad insist that they keep their relationship a secret from the public. Furious that Chad values his public image over their relationship, Sonny breaks up with him. He later apologizes by putting up a billboard that proclaims his feelings for her, prompting Sonny to forgive him and rekindle their relationship. It also inspires her to admit to the Randoms that they are dating, much to the Randoms' horror. Last Appearance of: Connie Munroe
33–34	12–13	"Sonny with a Secret"	Eric Dean Seaton	Michael Feldman & Steve Marmel	July 18, 2010	212–213	6.1
Sonny is thrilled to be celebrating her one-year anniversary with So Random!, but is hindered when a mysterious figure commits various acts (such as theft and plagiarism) and frames Sonny for them, leading to Sonny being fired from the show. Sonny is eventually cleared of the accusations and re-hired after it is revealed that one of the female cast members from Mackenzie Falls was sabotaging Sonny, jealous over her relationship with Chad. Even going as far as trying to frame Sonny for nearly killing the student body at her old school with a secret bomb. Absent: Allisyn Ashley Arm as Zora (in part one only) Guest stars: Leslie-Anne Huff as Penelope and Regan Burns as Ryan Loughlin Note: This episode was broadcast in a 4:3 letterboxed format on Disney Channel's standard definition feed. Also, when showing Sonny back in Wisconsin, she is wearing a brown wig, because in season 1, her hair is brown in contrast to season 2, where her hair is black. She had to wear a wig because they were filmed together, but one was before her hair changed to black.
35	14	"The Problem with Pauly"	Shelley Jensen	Josh Herman & Adam Schwartz	August 8, 2010	214	4.5
Sonny meets Pauly, the titular polar bear character from her favorite childhood show, Pauly and Pals. Hank (Bobby Slayton), the actor that plays Pauly, enlists Sonny to be Pauly for an hour at his meet-and-greet so that he can get a break, which she agrees to. However, Sonny's commitment to being Pauly interferes with her seven week anniversary date with Chad, causing the latter to believe Sonny has lost interest in him. Absent: Allisyn Ashley Arm as Zora
36	15	"That's So Sonny"	Eric Dean Seaton	Dava Savel	August 29, 2010	215	4.0
Chad is distraught that he does not have 1,000,000 fans on Flitter (a parody of Twitter), and even more so when his number of fans starts to decrease. Sonny enlists the help of Amber Algoode, the president of Chad's fan club, to help. However, Amber determines that Chad's relationship with Sonny is what has negatively affected his popularity, and demands he break up with her so he can reach his goal. Special guest star: Raven-Symoné as Amber Algoode Absent: Allisyn Ashley Arm as Zora
37	16	"Chad Without a Chance"	Eric Dean Seaton	Amy Engelberg & Wendy Engelberg	September 19, 2010	210	4.0
When Sonny gets sick, Chad agrees to tackle her usual job of assisting the Randoms with their various tasks, all leading to disastrous results. Pretty soon, they discover Sonny faked her illness to get the five of them to get along. So Random! sketch: "Sicky Vicky": In this sketch Sicky Vicky talks to the audience about ways to have fun when you are sick with Pink eye.
38	17	"My Two Chads"	Eric Dean Seaton	Dan Cohen & F.J. Pratt	September 26, 2010	211	4.0
Sonny finds out that Chad has sent his stunt double, Chaz Milton Looper, on every "dangerous" date with her. Sonny furiously breaks up with him, despite the fact that the couple are scheduled to appear on a pirate-themed game show hosted by Tawni. Having no choice but to do the game show together, their problems are exacerbated when Chad fails to answer a single question correctly, further proving Sonny's point that he doesn't know anything about her. By the end of the episode, Chad rides a bike (something he admits to not knowing how to do) in order to prove that he is serious about getting Sonny back. Touched by this, she agrees to give him a second chance. Absent: Allisyn Ashley Arm as Zora Special guest star: Lou Ferrigno as himself
39	18	"A So Random! Halloween Special"	Eric Dean Seaton	Josh Herman & Adam Schwartz	October 17, 2010	226	4.0
The first of two specials in the season, the show features a full episode of the show within a show, So Random!. Segments include "Check It Out Girls", "Halloween Do's and Don'ts" and "Roadkill McGill's Roadside Diner". The show also features musical performances from Sonny Munroe and Allstar Weekend; and celebrity host, Shaquille O'Neal. So Random! sketches: "Check-it-out girls"; "The Monster Under My Bed": A sketch from the Halloween Special. Sonny plays a mother and Zora is her daughter who gets attacked by a monster under her bed (Grady).; "Halloween Party Do's and Dont's": A Halloween sketch with all the casts being at a Halloween Party, saying good and bad things.; "Roadkill McGrill's Roadside Diner": Sonny and Nico are eating animal food from two country people (Tawni and Grady).; "Making Babies Cry": A videoclip with the So Random! cast with Nico playing Romeo Baby Smooth, a singer that likes making babies cry.; Note: This is Sonny's second time performing a song. Special guest stars: Shaquille O'Neal as himself and Allstar Weekend as themselves Songs featured: "Come Down With Love" and "Work of Art"
40	19	"Sonny with a 100% Chance of Meddling"	Ron Moseley	Lanny Horn & Josh Silverstein	October 24, 2010	219	2.83
Zora has a crush on Wesley Williger (Billy Unger), a child actor guest starring on Mackenzie Falls. Sonny tries to set the two up by inviting Wesley out for pizza with her and the Randoms, but Wesley is actually attracted to Sonny. Meanwhile, Nico and Grady enter a cell phone film festival with Dakota Condor as the star of their film, her unruly behavior makes her difficult to work with. So Random! sketch:: "Counselor Jenny and Dan Dan the Guitar Man": A sketch about camp counselors selling insensitive camp songs for a television commercial, "the same songs that got fired from over 100 summer camps."
41	20	"Dakota's Revenge"	Eric Dean Seaton	Dava Savel	November 14, 2010	223	3.7
Tawni accidentally runs over Dakota's bike with her car, so she and Sonny try desperately to get Izzy (Richard Libertini), the studio's prop master, to fix it. Meanwhile, Chad writes Dakota a song for her birthday, but Grady and Nico plan a prank on him. Last Appearance of: Dakota Condor
42	21	"Sonny with a Kiss"	Eric Dean Seaton	Ellen Byron & Lissa Kapstrom	November 21, 2010	220	3.6
After revealing in an interview that they have yet to share a kiss, Sonny and Chad start to feel pressured by their friends and fans to make it happen. They decide to break up to alleviate the pressure, but share their first kiss immediately thereafter. Meanwhile, Nico and Grady believe their temporary dressing room is being haunted by a dead comedian. So Random! sketch: "The Toilet Genie and the Nerd": Grady plays The Toilet Genie, a genie from a high school bathroom toilet who grants wishes to nerd Nico. Absent: Allisyn Ashley Arm as Zora Guest star: Johari Johnson as Tia
43	22	"A So Random! Holiday Special"	Eric Dean Seaton	Michael Feldman & Steve Marmel	November 28, 2010	218	3.8
Chad Dylan Cooper hosts a fully produced, Christmas-themed So Random! holiday special, with special musical guest Joe Jonas. So Random! sketches: "A Jonas for Christmas", "Joe-Nastics", "Bad Holiday Jobs", "The 12 Days of Sickmas with Sicky Vicky", "Holiday Cooking with Roadkill McGill" and "Christmas with the Real Princesses of New Jersey". Note: Sonny performs a duet for the first time and this is her third time performing a song. Special guest star: Joe Jonas as himself Songs featured: "Sing My Song for You"
44	23	"Sonny with a Grant"	Eric Dean Seaton	Michael Feldman & Steve Marmel	December 5, 2010	221	4.0
While all the other So Random! cast members are out of town during hiatus (with the exception of Tawni, whose cruise has been cancelled due to a hurricane), Grady's brother Grant makes a surprise visit. When Chad is fired from Mackenzie Falls after making too many demands of Mr. Condor, Grant replaces him as Mackenzie and wreaks havoc on Grady and Tawni. Absent: Brandon Mychal Smith as Nico and Allisyn Ashley Arm as Zora. Last Appearance of: Mr. Condor Note: This is the second time that Brandon Mychal Smith was absent for an episode. While she does appear, Demi Lovato only has a minor role. Delta House and the yellow and blue hats are a parody of the movie "National Lampoon's Animal House".
45	24	"Marshall with a Chance"	Shannon Flynn	Carla Banks Waddles	December 12, 2010	224	3.2
After Marshall is frustrated with the cast's unfunny sketch ideas, they retaliate by making a video mocking him. Marshall sees the video and decides to quit So Random! to pursue his own acting career, starting with a one-man play entitled My Life with Ma. When his replacement makes the show worse, they try to get him back. So Random! sketch: Two sketches related to the Japanese herb Wasabi including the game show "Where's the Wasabi?" and a Wasabi public service announcement featuring Grady. Guest star: Benjamin Byron Davis as Savage Stan Absent: Sterling Knight as Chad Dylan Cooper Note: This is the only time that Sterling Knight was absent for an episode this season. Last Appearance of: Marshall Pike
46	25	"Sonny with a Choice"	Eric Dean Seaton	Dan Cohen & F.J. Pratt	December 19, 2010	222	3.6
Both So Random! and Mackenzie Falls are nominated for Best Tween Show in the Tween Choice Awards, but the Randoms (with the exception of Sonny, as this is her first time being nominated for an award) are unable to get excited about this as they have lost to Mackenzie Falls every year thus far. In a shocking twist of events, So Random! wins. Chad, unable to cope with this, orders a recount of the votes and is delighted to find out that Mackenzie Falls has actually won, but Sonny, fed up with his egotism, breaks up with him. Meanwhile, Grady is mad at Nico after the latter takes credit for a joke that Grady came up with. Note: This is the final appearance of Zora Lancaster in Sonny with a Chance, although she appears in So Random!.
47	26	"New Girl"	Sean McNamara	Michael Feldman & Steve Marmel	January 2, 2011	225	3.71
Sonny writes and practices a song about her breakup with Chad, much to the annoyance of her new upstairs neighbor, Mel. Mel is later revealed to be a waitress at the Randoms' new hangout, a coffee shop called The Patio. Sonny bets Mel thirty dollars that she will receive a standing ovation if she performs the song at The Patio's open mic night, which she wins. After an encounter with Chad, Sonny starts humming the song she wrote while walking away, implying that she still has feelings for him. Meanwhile, Grady and Mel are crushing on each other. Absent: Allisyn Ashley Arm as Zora Final appearance of: Sonny Munroe Note: This is the final episode of Sonny with a Chance due to Lovato's departure. This was supposed to be a turning point in the show. So Random! continues without Demi Lovato. In the spin-off/sketch series, Chad Dylan Cooper (Sterling Knight) joins the cast of So Random!, replacing Sonny Munroe. This is also Sonny's fourth and final time performing a song. Songs featured: "What to Do"
