= Ricky Kalmon =

American mindset expert (born 1968)

- Born: September 30, 1968 (age 58); St. Louis, Missouri, U.S.

Comedy career
- Years active: 1986–present
- Genres: Stage Hypnotist, Motivational Speaker, TV Personality
- Website: rickykalmon.com

Ricky Kalmon (born September 30, 1968) is an American mindset expert, stage hypnotist, motivational speaker, TV personality and creator of self-improvement programs to enhance meditation and reduce stress.

== Early life ==
Born and raised in St. Louis, Missouri, Kalmon began performing as a childhood magician, a hobby which later developed into his career. In the late 1980s, he became intrigued with the art of hypnosis while still performing magic at special events and parties. In 1986, Kalmon developed and refined his stage hypnosis show, and by 1991, he was performing regularly at comedy clubs, casinos and festivals throughout the USA.

== Career ==
In the mid-1990s, he began evolving his hypnosis show into a motivational keynote aimed at corporate audiences, unprecedented for hypnotists at the time. The first program is a comedy stage hypnosis show. He first selects a dozen audience members to come on stage and be seated next to each other. Using hypnotic induction techniques, and the power of suggestion, he convinces participants to act out comic scenarios.

== Media appearances ==
Kalmon has appeared on ESPN, Hallmark Channel, HLN and Comedy Central.

Kalmon is also regularly invited to perform for a variety of American professional sports teams including the New York Yankees, Arizona Diamondbacks and Cincinnati Bengals.

== Television ==
In 2005, Kalmon produced and starred in Seeing Stars on TV Guide Channel in which he hypnotizes strangers into believing they are actual celebrities.

In 2012, Kalmon produced and appeared in SNAP! on Disney Channel hosted by So Random! duo Doug Brochu and Brandon Mychal Smith. In the show, Kalmon helps kids hypnotize their parents into doing what they want them to do.

He has also appeared as a guest on numerous television programs including The Doctors and The List explaining the benefits of hypnosis for breaking addictive habits.

== Digital media ==
He is the host of Amplify Your Mindset, a podcast interviewing business leaders about their success and personal growth.

Kalmon published a mobile app with guided meditation tools and techniques for personal and professional mindfulness.

== Published works ==
Kalmon is the author of 7 self-help and motivational audio programs designed for personal and professional empowerment through his research-based “Subsconscious Makeover®” System:

- Kalmon, Ricky (2000). Quit Smoking: A Guide to Behavioral Modification Using Self-Hypnosis. Atlanta. ASIN B003CZMVKW.
- Kalmon, Ricky (2003). Reducing Stress: A Guide to Behavioral Modification Using Self-Hypnosis. Atlanta. ASIN B005K0JASS.
- Kalmon, Ricky (2003). Ricky Kalmon Presents: Lose Weight a Guide to Behavioral Modification Using Self-Hypnosis. Atlanta. ASIN B005K0J0HO.
- Kalmon, Ricky (2006). Hypnotist Ricky Kalmon Presents: A Subconscious Makeover System for Golfers. Atlanta. ASIN B003J8XLRY.
- Kalmon, Ricky (2014). Ricky Kalmon Presents: Sleep Better. Atlanta. ASIN B073V73KNB.
- Kalmon, Ricky (2014). Ricky Kalmon Presents: Unlock Your Selling Ability! (A Guide to Behavioral Modification Using Self-Hypnosis). Atlanta. ASIN B00B622OH8.
- Kalmon, Ricky (2020). Leverage Your Mindset. Atlanta. ASIN B08BX3GTFX.
