= Disney's Friends for Change =

Pro-social environmental initiative by Disney Channel

- Also known as: Disney's Friends for Change; Friends for Change: Project Green
- Genre: Public service announcement
- Starring: 56 Disney Channel and Disney XD stars
- Narrated by: 56 Disney Channel and Disney XD stars
- Opening theme: "Send It On" "Make a Wave" "We Can Change the World" "Rise"
- Countries of origin: United States, Canada
- Original language: English

Production
- Running time: 30 seconds - 2 minutes

Original release
- Network: Disney Channel
- Release: May 15, 2009

Disney's Friends for Change (also referred to as Friends for Change: Project Green) is a pro-social environmental initiative that was used by Disney Channel from 2009 until the mid-2010s.

== History ==
Actors from Disney Channel shows were featured in television and radio campaigns encouraging young fans to take action on environmental issues in four key areas: climate, waste, water, and habitat. Demi Lovato, Miley Cyrus, Selena Gomez, and the Jonas Brothers were among the original stars in the 30-second to two-minute public service announcements airing on Disney Channel and Radio Disney. As part of the initiative, viewers were encouraged to pledge online to adopt environmentally-friendly habits such as recycling through the Disney Channel website. They could also vote to help choose how Disney would invest one million dollars in various environmental programs.

The initiative was presented instead of the 2009 and 2010 Disney Channel Games. The first Disney's Friends for Change Games premiered June 24, 2011, on Disney Channel, replacing the Disney Channel Games. A special 30-minute program called Lights, Camera, Take Action! Backstage with Disney's Friends for Change, which was shown on Disney Channel after the premiere of Wizards of Waverly Place: The Movie, was hosted by Tiffany Thornton and directed by Michael Blum and Tracy Pion. It showcased behind-the-scenes footage during the making of the project.

Over the years, over 56 Disney Channel and Disney XD stars participated in the initiative. Some participants left the initiative when their show ended. The program was quietly discontinued in the mid-2010s.

== Friends for Change Games ==
The first Disney's Friends for Change Games premiered June 24, 2011, on Disney Channel, replacing the Disney Channel Games. A special 30-minute program called Lights, Camera, Take Action! Backstage with Disney's Friends for Change, which was shown on Disney Channel after Wizards of Waverly Place: The Movie premiered, was hosted by Tiffany Thornton and directed by Michael Blum and Tracy Pion. It showcased behind-the-scenes footage during the making of the project.

== Participants ==
Below is a list of stars that participated in the initiative.

Star	Show/Film Representing
Nicole Gale Anderson	Jonas
Moisés Arias	Hannah Montana
Jake T. Austin	Wizards of Waverly Place, Wizards of Waverly Place: The Movie
Miley Cyrus	Hannah Montana
Matthew "Mdot" Finley	Camp Rock 2: The Final Jam
Jordan Francis	Camp Rock, Camp Rock 2: The Final Jam
Selena Gomez	Wizards of Waverly Place, Princess Protection Program, Wizards of Waverly Place: The Movie
David Henrie	Wizards of Waverly Place, Wizards of Waverly Place: The Movie
Joe Jonas	Jonas, Camp Rock, Camp Rock 2: The Final Jam
Kevin Jonas	Jonas, Camp Rock, Camp Rock 2: The Final Jam
Nick Jonas	Jonas, Camp Rock, Camp Rock 2: The Final Jam
Demi Lovato	Sonny with a Chance, Camp Rock, Princess Protection Program, Camp Rock 2: The Final Jam, As the Bell Rings
Meaghan Martin	Camp Rock, Camp Rock 2: The Final Jam
Kyle Massey	Cory in the House, That's So Raven, Fish Hooks, American Dragon: Jake Long, Life is Ruff
Emily Osment	Hannah Montana
Bradley Steven Perry	Good Luck Charlie, Mighty Med, Lab Rats: Elite Force, Good Luck Charlie, It's Christmas!
Anna Maria Perez de Tagle	Camp Rock, Camp Rock 2: The Final Jam
Jasmine Richards	Camp Rock, Camp Rock 2: The Final Jam, Naturally, Sadie
Jake Short	A.N.T. Farm, Mighty Med, Lab Rats: Elite Force
Brenda Song	Get a Clue, The Suite Life of Zack & Cody, The Suite Life on Deck, Stuck in the Suburbs, Wendy Wu: Homecoming Warrior, The Suite Life Movie
Cole Sprouse	The Suite Life of Zack & Cody,The Suite Life on Deck, The Suite Life Movie
Dylan Sprouse	The Suite Life of Zack & Cody,The Suite Life on Deck, The Suite Life Movie
Jennifer Stone	Wizards of Waverly Place, Wizards of Waverly Place: The Movie
Alyson Stoner	The Suite Life of Zack & Cody,The Suite Life on Deck, Phineas and Ferb, Camp Rock, Camp Rock 2: The Final Jam
Gregg Sulkin	Wizards of Waverly Place, Avalon High
Brandon Mychal Smith	Sonny with a Chance, So Random!, Let it Shine
Caroline Sunshine	Shake It Up
Bella Thorne	Shake It Up, Frenemies
Tiffany Thornton	Sonny with a Chance, So Random!
Doug Brochu	Sonny with a Chance, So Random!
Allisyn Ashley Arm	Sonny with a Chance, So Random!
Chloe Bridges	Camp Rock 2: The Final Jam
Kelsey Chow	Pair of Kings, Den Brother
Davis Cleveland	Shake It Up
Hutch Dano	Zeke and Luther, Den Brother
Jason Dolley	Hatching Pete, Good Luck Charlie, Good Luck Charlie, It's Christmas!
Kenton Duty	Shake It Up
Roshon Fegan	Camp Rock, Camp Rock 2: The Final Jam, Shake It Up
Adam Hicks	Zeke and Luther, Lemonade Mouth
Adam Irigoyen	Shake It Up
Sterling Knight	Sonny with a Chance, So Random!, Starstruck
Daniel Curtis Lee	Zeke and Luther
Caitlyn Taylor Love	I'm in the Band
Bridgit Mendler	Good Luck Charlie, Lemonade Mouth, Good Luck Charlie, It's Christmas!
Logan Miller	I'm in the Band
Mitchel Musso	Hannah Montana, Pair of Kings, Hatching Pete, Phineas and Ferb
Ryan Newman	Zeke and Luther
Ryan Ochoa	Pair of Kings
Doc Shaw	The Suite Life on Deck, Pair of Kings
Carlon Jeffery	A.N.T. Farm, Cloud 9
Sierra McCormick	A.N.T. Farm
Stefanie Scott	A.N.T. Farm, Frenemies
China Anne McClain	A.N.T. Farm, How to Build a Better Boy
Chelsea Kane	Jonas, Fish Hooks
Jason Earles	Hannah Montana, Kickin' It
Debby Ryan	The Suite Life on Deck, Jessie, The Suite Life Movie, Radio Rebel
Ross Lynch	Austin & Ally, Teen Beach Movie, Teen Beach 2
Laura Marano	Austin & Ally, Bad Hair Day
Cameron Boyce	Jessie, Gamer's Guide to Pretty Much Everything, Descendants
Zendaya	Shake It Up, Frenemies, K.C. Undercover, Zapped
Karan Brar	Jessie, Bunk'd, Invisible Sister
Skai Jackson	Jessie, Bunk'd
Peyton List	Jessie, Bunk'd, The Swap

== Donations ==
Amount	Organization	Intent
$100,000	Wildlife Conservation Society	To protect arctic wildlife from the effects of climate change
$50,000	San Bernardino National Forest Association	To be used in the SBNFA's Children's Forest, where children plant new trees
$50,000	BirdLife International and Haribon Foundation	To protect endangered tropical forests in the Philippines
$25,000	CHF International	To decrease pollution and deforestation by sending fuel-efficient stoves to Rwanda
$25,000	ECOLIFE Foundation International	To help end deforestation in the Oyamel forest in Mexico
$10,000	Arbor Day Foundation	To replant trees in Florida state forests damaged by wildfires

== "Make a Wave" ==
"Make a Wave"

Promotional single by Demi Lovato and Joe Jonas
- Released: February 26, 2010
- Recorded: 2009
- Genre: Pop
- Length: 4:01
- Label: Walt Disney, Hollywood
- Songwriters: Scott Krippayne, Jeff Peabody

Music video
- "Make a Wave" on YouTube

"Make a Wave" is a song sung by Demi Lovato and Joe Jonas for Disney's Friends for Change, a charity group formed by Disney for their "Friends for Change" campaign. The song was written by Scott Krippayne and Jeff Peabody, the same team that wrote Jordin Sparks' song "This Is My Now" for American Idol. "Make a Wave" was introduced and performed at Walt Disney World Resort in Lake Buena Vista, Florida. It was also featured in the 2009 Disneynature film Oceans.

=== Background ===
The song debuted on February 26, 2010 on Radio Disney, peaking at number 4 on the Top 30 Countdown, while the music video premiered on Disney Channel on March 14, 2010, and was released online the following day at Disney.com. "Make a Wave" was available beginning March 15, 2010 on iTunes, with all proceeds benefiting environmental charities through the Disney Worldwide Conservation Fund. Oceans was released in theaters on April 22, 2010 (Earth Day).

=== Music video ===
The music video premiered on Disney Channel on March 14, 2010 and was released online the following day at Disney.com. It was directed by Michael Blum and Tracy Pion, and was filmed at Point Dume in Malibu. The video features Joe and Demi enjoying the beach and performing the song, intercut with footage from the film Oceans.

=== Chart performance ===
The song peaked at number 84 on the Billboard Hot 100. The song was a success on Radio Disney's Top 30 Countdown.

=== Track listings ===
- U.S. / Digital Download
1. "Make a Wave" (Digital Download) – 4:01
2. "Make a Wave" (Instrumental) – 3:48

=== Charts ===
Chart (2010)	Peak position
US Billboard Hot 100	84

=== Awards ===
Year	Category	Work	Result	Award	Ref.
2011	"Charity Single"	Make a Wave	Won	Do Something Awards	

== "We Can Change the World" ==
"We Can Change the World"

Promotional single by Bridgit Mendler
- Released: June 11, 2011
- Recorded: 2011
- Genre: Pop
- Length: 3:19
- Label: Hollywood
- Songwriters: Bridgit Mendler; Joacim Persson

"We Can Change the World" is a song sung by Bridgit Mendler for the Disney's Friends for Change campaign and specifically, for the first Disney's Friends for Change Games. The song was written by Mendler and Joacim Persson.

=== Background ===
The song premiered on Radio Disney on June 10, 2011. With its release, Disney donated $250,000 to the Disney Worldwide Conservation Fund. The song was made available for download on the Friends for Change website and on iTunes on June 11. All proceeds went to environmental charities, similar to the other songs released for the initiative.

=== Music video ===
The music video premiered on Disney Channel on June 10, 2011. It was directed by Art Spigel, director of the Disney's Friends for Change Games, and was filmed on-location at Disney Golden Oak Ranch in Los Angeles, California. The song features Mendler singing in a park with a camera in her hand and into a microphone. Children from all over the world eventually join her in singing the anthem, including international Disney Channel stars Valeria Baroni, Jorge Blanco, Olavo Cavalheiro, Nicole Ishida, Murtuza Kutianawala and Eve Ottino.

=== Track listings ===
- U.S. / Digital download
1. "We Can Change the World" – 3:19
- U.K. / Digital download
1. "We Can Change the World" – 3:19
2. "We Can Change the World (Instrumental)" – 3:19

=== Release history ===
Country	Date	Format	Label
United States	June 11, 2011	Digital download	Hollywood Records

== "Rise" ==
"Rise"

Promotional single by McClain Sisters
- Released: March 26, 2012
- Recorded: 2012
- Genre: R&B; pop
- Length: 4:11
- Label: Walt Disney, Hollywood
- Songwriter: The McClains

"Rise" is a song sung by McClain Sisters for the Disney's Friends for Change campaign for the second Disney's Friends for Change Games. It was also used in the end credits of the Disneynature film, Chimpanzee. The song was written by the McClains.

=== Background ===
The song premiered on iTunes on March 23, 2012.

=== Music video ===
The music video premiered on Vevo on March 26, 2012.

=== Track listings ===
- U.S. / Digital Download
1. "Rise" (Digital Download) – 4:11

=== Charts ===
Chart (2012)	Peak position
US Kid Digital Songs (Billboard)	4
