= My Family Tree =

- Country of origin: United States
- Original language: English

Production
- Camera setup: Videotape (filmized); Multi-camera
- Running time: 2-5 minutes

Original release
- Network: Disney Channel
- Release: November 2010 – 2011

My Family Tree is a Disney Channel series of shorts that first aired in November 2010, which are still airing on Disney Channel.

== Premise ==
The shorts consist of a child traveling to another state or country to visit their family. Before traveling, they share how they're specifically related to the relatives that they're visiting. They usually show their family on video saying hello to them.

== See also ==
- Disney's Friends for Change
- List of programs broadcast by Disney Channel
