= This Just In! =

- Created by: Steve Marmel; Kevin Kay
- Country of origin: United States
- Original language: English

Production
- Running time: 30 minutes

Original release
- Network: Spike
- Release: 2004

This Just In! is an American adult animated series that follows the misadventures and exploits of reporter Brian Newport. It was shown on Spike TV in 2004. The show was co-created by comedian Steve Marmel and former Nickelodeon executive Kevin Kay, and written by Marmel and Jeff Rothpan.

The title referred to the producers' intentions to comment on the latest news and politics in an animated series that was created swiftly with computer animation.

== Themes ==
Regarding the conservative politics of the series' main character, creator Steve Marmel stated, "Most of the time you see a conservative on a TV show, he's played as a zealot or a boob. I wanted to do a show where the conservative wasn't the idiot." Marmel also stated about the show's protagonist, "Brian has passionate opinions about things. He's all in, but he's smart. He believes for what he believes in and fights for it every episode." The series satirized both left-wing and right-wing targets. Kevin Kay described the show as having "a conservative bent on politics", though Marmel described his own political views as "raging moderate".
