= So Random! =

2011 American television series

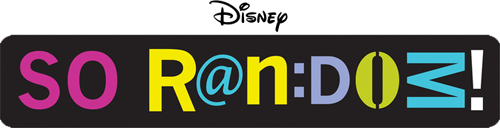
- Genre: Variety show Sketch comedy
- Created by: Steve Marmel
- Based on: Sonny with a Chance by Steve Marmel
- Developed by: Michael Feldman
- Starring: Tiffany Thornton; Sterling Knight; Brandon Mychal Smith; Doug Brochu; Allisyn Ashley Arm
- Theme music composer: Ali Dee Theodore; Julian Michael Davis; Jason Gleed
- Opening theme: "So Random!", performed by Brandon Mychal Smith
- Ending theme: "So Random!" (short version)
- Composers: Chris Alan Lee; Scott Clausen
- Country of origin: United States
- Original language: English
- No. of seasons: 1
- No. of episodes: 26

Production
- Executive producers: Brian Robbins; Sharla Sumpter Bridgett; Steve Marmel; Michael Feldman; Patty Gary-Cox
- Production locations: Hollywood Center Studios; Hollywood, California
- Running time: 22 minutes
- Production companies: Varsity Pictures; It's a Laugh Productions

Original release
- Network: Disney Channel
- Release: June 5, 2011 – March 25, 2012

Related
- Sonny with a Chance

So Random! is an American sketch comedy television series created by Steve Marmel and developed by Michael Feldman that aired on Disney Channel from June 5, 2011, to March 25, 2012. It was announced as an independent series after Demi Lovato left the parent series, Sonny with a Chance, created by Marmel. The series features the actors from Sonny with a Chance, besides Lovato: Tiffany Thornton, Sterling Knight, Brandon Mychal Smith, Doug Brochu, and Allisyn Ashley Arm along with other featured actors who recur in the series. The series premiere was watched by 4.07 million viewers.

On May 2, 2012, Tiffany Thornton announced that the series had not been renewed for a second season and the show was cancelled after only one season.

== Concept, production and premise ==
In Sonny with a Chance, Demi Lovato plays the title character, Sonny Munroe, a new member of the cast of the sketch comedy show So Random!, which is presented as a show-within-a-show. The series follows the experiences of Sonny, and the rest of the cast. The full-length sketch comedy episode format was played within Sonny with a Chance during season 2 of the series for the Christmas and Halloween episodes. In November 2010, Lovato underwent treatment for "physical and emotional issues", and in April 2011, Lovato confirmed that she would not be returning to Sonny with a Chance for its third season, and stated that returning to acting immediately would be unhealthy for her recovery.

Following Lovato's departure from the series, So Random! was introduced as its own series that focused more on comedy skits than Sonny with a Chance. Filming for the season began on January 30, 2011. Each episode features sketch comedy skits with the So Random! cast, as well as a performance by a music artist. Originally intended to be a third season of Sonny with a Chance, Disney began to describe the show as a separate series following Lovato's confirmed departure.

Each episode typically consists of five or six sketches. Although it is formatted as a sketch comedy series, So Random! retains the fictional universe style of the sitcom it spun off from, with the main cast members playing both the characters they originated on Sonny with a Chance, in addition to playing the characters appearing in each of the sketches. Such a reference to Sonny with a Chance was made when Grady kept hitting the applause button while trying to open a pickle jar, and Zora goes offstage to tell him to stop. She asks what he is doing, and he tells her that he always has a pickle before the show and cannot open the jar. Zora opens the jar without difficulty, horrifying Grady. However, the episode "Miss Piggy" would be the only episode to feature backstage scenes where Grady, Zora, and several other cast members visit Miss Piggy in her dressing room.

Each episode was typically written by two writers (whereas opening segments and sketches in a traditional sketch comedy series are written by a team of up to twelve writers).

== Cast ==
=== Main ===
The main cast of So Random!

Except for Demi Lovato, the main cast of So Random! is identical to that of its parent series, Sonny with a Chance.

- Tiffany Thornton as Tawni Hart
- Sterling Knight as Chad Dylan Cooper
- Brandon Mychal Smith as Nico Harris
- Doug Brochu as Grady Mitchell
- Allisyn Ashley Arm as Zora Lancaster

=== Recurring ===
- Matthew Scott Montgomery as Matthew Bailey
- Shayne Topp as Shayne Zabo
- Damien Haas as Damien Johanssen
- Grace Bannon as Grace Wetzel
- Bridget Shergalis as Bridget Cook
- Audrey Whitby as Audrey Vale

=== Guest stars and artists ===
==== Performers ====
- Cody Simpson, performing "All Day"
- Greyson Chance, performing "Waiting Outside the Lines"
- Selena Gomez & the Scene, performing "Who Says"
- Mitchel Musso, performing "Get Away", and participating in a sketch
- Jacob Latimore, performing "Like 'Em All"
- Mindless Behavior, performing "My Girl"
- Colbie Caillat, performing "Brighter Than the Sun"
- Kicking Daisies, performing "Keeping Secrets"
- Dave Days, performing "What Does it Take"
- Far East Movement and Miguel, performing "Rocketeer", and participating in a sketch
- Hot Chelle Rae, performing "Tonight Tonight"
- Iyaz and Mann, performing "Pretty Girls"
- Lemonade Mouth, performing "Determinate" (with Bridgit Mendler and Adam Hicks also participating in sketches)
- Pia Toscano, performing "This Time"
- Justin Bieber, performing "Mistletoe"
- Christina Grimmie, performing "Advice"
- Andy Grammer, performing "Keep Your Head Up"
- The Ready Set, performing "Young Forever"
- China Anne McClain, performing "Unstoppable", and participating in sketches
- New Boyz, performing "Meet My Mom"
- Shane Harper, performing "One Step Closer"
- Destinee & Paris performing, "True Love"
- Coco Jones performing "Stand Up" and participating in sketches

==== Participators in sketches ====
- Tony Hawk
- Miss Piggy (played by Eric Jacobson)
- Chelsea Kane
- Leigh-Allyn Baker and Mia Talerico
- Dylan and Cole Sprouse and Debby Ryan

== Episodes ==
No.	Title	Directed by	Written by	Original release date	Prod. code	US viewers (millions)
1	"Cody Simpson"	Jay Karas	Michael Feldman & Steve Marmel	June 5, 2011	301	4.07
Cody Simpson performs "All Day". Special musical guest: Cody Simpson; Guest stars: Grace Bannon, Damien Haas, Matthew Scott Montgomery, Shayne Topp Sketches: All Star Wheel of Fortune, Helmet Ninjas, Zombie Man, Rufus: Kid with Excuses, Tantrum Girl on Ponies
2	"Greyson Chance"	Eric Dean Seaton	Michael Feldman & Steve Marmel	June 12, 2011	303	3.75
Greyson Chance performs "Waiting Outside the Lines". Special musical guest: Greyson Chance; Guest stars: Grace Bannon, Damien Haas, Bridget Shergalis, Shayne Topp, Audrey Whitby and Matthew Scott Montgomery, Nancy Cartwright Sketches: Socks with Sandals, Learning Spanish with Reynaldo Rivera, Bedazzle Zit, The Sparrow Family, The I'm Going to Marry Zach Feldman Show
3	"Selena Gomez & the Scene"	Bruce Leddy	Scott King	June 19, 2011	305	3.88
Selena Gomez & the Scene performs "Who Says". Special musical guest: Selena Gomez & the Scene; Guest stars: Damien Haas, Bridget Shergalis, Shayne Topp; Sketches: Schooled by Grammar, Teen Rage, Lil' Texters, Olaf Glutella: Fake Foreign Exchange Student, Garlic Garden, Sag Down Smackdown Note: Selena Gomez previously appeared in the Sonny with a Chance episode "Battle of the Networks' Stars".
4	"Mitchel Musso"	Bruce Leddy	Dava Savel	June 25, 2011	304	N/A
Mitchel Musso performs "Get Away" and participates in a sketch. Special music guest: Mitchel Musso; Guest stars: Grace Bannon, Damien Haas, Matthew Scott Montgomery, Bridget Shergalis, Shayne Topp Sketches: Strawberry Shortbread Saves The Earth, (Guac-A-Mole), Anime Brothers Do Stuff, Possibly Sarcastic Skip, Roadkill McGill's Roadside Diner, Carnival Games, The Real Princesses of New Jersey: The Fairy Godfather
5	"Tony Hawk"	Linda Mendoza	Michael Feldman & Steve Marmel	July 10, 2011	302	3.74
Tony Hawk guest stars and does a sketch on the show while the main cast of the show tries to make him do something extreme. He finally flies out at the end of the show. Special guest: Tony Hawk; Guest stars: Grace Bannon, Damien Haas, Matthew Scott Montgomery, Bridget Shergalis, Shayne Topp and Drew Baker Sketches: Tantrum Girl on Recess, Braggy Benson, Lunch Lady Selects, Backstage from Lunch Lady Selects, School Announcements, Tantrum Girl on Smart Phones, Ooo, Yeah, Uhh... No
6	"Coco Jones"	Bruce Leddy	Jessica Kaminsky	July 17, 2011	306	2.66
Coco Jones performs "Stand Up" and participates in a sketch. Special musical guest: Coco Jones; Guest stars: Grace Bannon, Damien Haas, Matthew Scott Montgomery, Audrey Whitby Sketches: Bracey Girrlz Rap, Sally Jensen: Kid Lawyer, Nolan: Part 1, Angus: Supermodel from Down Under, Nolan: Part 2, The Back Up Singers, Nolan: Part 3
7	"Jacob Latimore"	Bruce Leddy	Josh Silverstein & Lanny Horn	July 31, 2011	308	2.40
Jacob Latimore performs "Like 'Em All", Tomato Sue raps about ketchup, and Reynaldo starts a fight between sisters during his Spanish lesson! Special musical guest: Jacob Latimore; Guest stars: Damien Haas, Coco Jones, Matthew Scott Montgomery, Bridget Shergalis, Shayne Topp Sketches: Ketchup on Everything, Rufus at the Movies, Puppy Playdate, Sally Jensen: Kid Lawyer, The Back Up Singers II, The Sparrow Family
8	"Mindless Behavior"	Bruce Leddy	Adam Schwartz & Josh Herman	August 7, 2011	307	2.78
Mindless Behavior performs "My Girl". The So Random! cast tries to find Rufus. Special musical guest: Mindless Behavior; Guest stars: Damien Haas, Matthew Scott Montgomery, Shayne Topp, Audrey Whitby and Drew Baker; Sketches: Awkward Years Cocoon, The Coolest Kid in School: Part 1, Mr. McNamara, The Coolest Kid in School: Part 2, The Platowski Brothers, Crazy Carson's Lost N Found, The Coolest Kid in School: Part 3 Note: This episode aired on Disney XD on Sunday, October 24, 2011. Also, the Crazy Carson sketch has been used in two other episodes.
9	"Colbie Caillat"	Eric Dean Seaton	Maiya Williams	August 14, 2011	309	2.79
Colbie Caillat performs "Brighter Than the Sun". Special musical guest: Colbie Caillat; Guest stars: Damien Haas, Matthew Scott Montgomery, Audrey Whitby, Shayne Topp, Bridget Shergalis; Sketches: The iPatch, Angus Comes to Dinner, Cheereleader Tryouts: Part 1 , The Coolest Kid in School: Part 4, Cheereleader Tryouts: Part 2, The Coolest Kid in School: Part 5, Cheereleader Tryouts: Part 3, The Coolest Kid in School: Part 6 Note: As of December 23, 2011 this episode has been removed from the airing schedule and is being re-evaluated due to eating disorder references.
10	"Far East Movement"	Eric Dean Seaton	Eric Truehart & Sib Ventress	August 21, 2011	310	2.65
Far East Movement and Miguel perform "Rocketeer". Special musical guests: Far East Movement, Miguel; Guest stars: Damien Haas, Matthew Scott Montgomery, Shayne Topp, Bridget Shergalis Sketches: Harry Potter in the Real World, P-Brain's No Pain Bad News Auto Tuner, Teen Rage: Making a Music Video, Moon Landing Bloopers, Zombie Man 2
11	"Kicking Daisies"	Eric Dean Seaton	Eric Truehart & Sib Ventress	August 28, 2011	311	2.30
Kicking Daisies perform "Keeping Secrets". Special musical guest: Kicking Daisies; Guest stars: Damien Haas, Matthew Scott Montgomery, Shayne Topp, Bridget Shergalis, Audrey Whitby, Grace Bannon; Sketches: Crazy Carson's Lost 'n' Found, Simple Country Boy: Part 1, Project Airport Runway: Part 1, Flash Mob: China Shop, Project Airport Runway: Part 2, Simple Country Boy: Part 2, Project Airport Runway Part 3, Your Daughter's Closet Note: This is Grace Bannon's last episode.
12	"Dave Days"	Eric Dean Seaton	Scott King	September 11, 2011	313	2.12
Dave Days performs "What Does It Take". Special musical guest: Dave Days; Guest stars: Matthew Scott Montgomery, Shayne Topp, Damien Haas, and Audrey Whitby; Sketches: All Magical Student Wheel of Fortune, Teachers Don't Try to Be Cool, Chilly Slab Ice Creamery, Ice Heels, Vampire Kittens Note: This episode was originally scheduled to air on September 18, 2011.
13	"Chelsea Kane/Hot Chelle Rae"	Eric Dean Seaton	Dava Savel	September 18, 2011	317	3.15
Hot Chelle Rae performs "Tonight Tonight". Special guest: Chelsea Kane; Special musical guest: Hot Chelle Rae; Guest stars: Matthew Scott Montgomery, Damien Haas, Shayne Topp, Bridget Shergalis, Audrey Whitby, Sketches: VoldeMart, Nolan Knows Best: Part 1, Dance Fever, Nolan Knows Best: Part 2, Sunglass Sass-Off, Nolan Knows Best: Part 3
14	"Miss Piggy"	Eric Dean Seaton	Michael Feldman & Steve Marmel	October 2, 2011	316	3.17
Miss Piggy guest stars and participates in several sketches. Special guest: Miss Piggy, (Performed by Eric Jacobson); Guest stars: Matthew Scott Montgomery, Damien Haas, Shayne Topp; Sketches: Pitching to Piggy Part 1, Pitching to Piggy Part 2, Odor Meaters, Sweets vs. Grain, Pitching to Piggy Part 3, Pitching for Miss Piggy Part 4, The Real Princesses of New Jersey Notes: Even though not in the episode with Miss Piggy, Kermit the Frog was mentioned in the episode when Miss Piggy told him on the phone about So Random! getting its own show and Chad becoming a Random. This is the first episode to reveal the first names of three cast members (Matthew, Damien, Shayne) except for "Greyson Chance" with Audrey Vale. This is also the first episode to feature off-stage sequences featuring some of the cast members talking to Miss Piggy in her dressing room.
15	"Iyaz"	Eric Dean Seaton	Michael Feldman & Steve Marmel	October 9, 2011	321	3.60
Iyaz performs "Pretty Girls" featuring Mann. Special musical guests: Iyaz, featuring Mann; Guest stars: Matthew Scott Montgomery, Damien Haas, Shayne Topp, Audrey Whitby, Bridget Shergalis; Sketches: Candy Pants, Halloween Do's and Dont's: Part 1, Sally Jensen: Kid Lawyer, Halloween Do's and Dont's: Part 2, Fly Guy (Superhero), Halloween Do's and Dont's: Part 3, Rufus: Halloween Note: This is a So Random! Halloween special. The "Halloween Do's and Don'ts" segments from A So Random! Halloween Special on Sonny with a Chance are used in this episode.
16	"Bridgit Mendler, Adam Hicks and Hayley Kiyoko"	Michael Feldman	Jessica Kaminsky	November 6, 2011	318	3.31
Bridgit Mendler, Adam Hicks and Hayley Kiyoko perform "Determinate". Special musical guests: Bridgit Mendler, Adam Hicks and Hayley Kiyoko; Guest stars: Matthew Scott Montgomery, Shayne Topp, Damien Haas, Chris Brochu, Bridget Shergalis and Audrey Whitby Sketches: Talking To Girls with Chester McFowler, Class President Ads, Manny McPhee, Harry Potter In the Real World II
17	"Leigh-Allyn Baker and Mia Talerico"	Carl Lauten	Jessica Kaminsky	November 27, 2011	324	3.07
Pia Toscano performs her new single called, "This Time" Special musical guest: Pia Toscano; Special guest stars: Leigh-Allyn Baker and Mia Talerico from Good Luck Charlie; Guest stars: Matthew Scott Montgomery, Shayne Topp, Damien Haas, Bridget Shergalis and Audrey Whitby; Sketches: Rufus at the Restaurant, Why? With Mia, Cheerleader Tryouts, Awkward Moments Note: "This Time" is the only song that's not featured on the Radio Disney request list.
18	"Justin Bieber"	Bruce Leddy	Michael Feldman & Steve Marmel	December 4, 2011	325	3.34
Justin Bieber performs "Mistletoe". Special musical guest: Justin Bieber; Guest stars: Matthew Scott Montgomery, Shayne Topp, Damien Haas, Bridget Shergalis and Audrey Whitby (in the audience uncredited) Sketches: MC Grammar Claus, The Platowski Brothers, The Coolest Kid In School, Volde-Mart, Raised By Beavers
19	"Christina Grimmie"	Eric Dean Seaton	Gina Roncoli	December 11, 2011	315	3.02
Christina Grimmie performs "Advice". Special musical guest: Christina Grimmie; Guest stars: Matthew Scott Montgomery, Shayne Topp, Damien Haas, Bridget Shergalis and Audrey Whitby Sketches: The Anime Brothers, Teachers Don't Be Cool II, Sally Jenson Kid Lawyer
20	"Andy Grammer"	Eric Dean Seaton	David Witt	January 8, 2012	322	2.86
Andy Grammer performs "Keep Your Head Up". Special musical guest: Andy Grammer. Guest stars: Matthew Scott Montgomery, Coco Jones, Damien Haas, Shayne Topp, Audrey Whitby Sketches: The Anime Brothers, Sargent Slumber's Sleepover Boot Camp, Tales from the FBI: Fairytale Bureau Investigation, Puppy Playdate
21	"Cole & Dylan Sprouse"	Bruce Leddy	Adam Schwartz & Josh Herman	January 16, 2012	319	2.69
Cole & Dylan Sprouse guest star and participate in several sketches. Special guest: Dylan and Cole Sprouse and Debby Ryan Sketches: Sally Jensen: Kid Lawyer: Cartoons, Inappropriate Places for a Flash Mob: Court, Staring Contest, The Anime Brothers vs. The Transformer Brothers, The Lost Episode of The Suite Life on Deck, Teachers Don't Be Cool III
22	"The Ready Set"	Eric Dean Seaton	Michael Feldman & Steve Marmel	January 29, 2012	312	2.77
The Ready Set performs "Young Forever". Special guest: The Ready Set Sketches: Possibly Sarcastic Skip, Raised By Beavers II, So Random's Inappropriate places for a flash mob, Madeline Online, The Biggest Loser Ruins Your Meal, Simple Country Boy
23	"China Anne McClain"	Michael Feldman	Adam Schwartz & Josh Herman & Josh Silverstein & Lanny Horn	February 12, 2012	326	2.25
China Anne McClain performs "Unstoppable". Special guest: China Anne McClain Sketches: So Logical, Teacher's Don't Try To Be Cool IV, Cheerleader Tryouts: Benson Green, Angus: Shin-ezizer, Cheerleader Tryouts: Nancy Green, Crazy Carson's Lost 'n' Found
24	"The New Boyz"	Eric Dean Seaton	Anthony Watt	February 26, 2012	314	2.18
The New Boyz performs "Meet My Mom". Special guest: The New Boyz Sketches: Dancing With the Internet Stars, I'm Going to Marry Zach Feldman Show II, Captain Obvious I, Lady Gaga: Born to Play, Captain Obvious II, Are You Smarter Than a Fifth Grader?: Tech Edition, Captain Obvious III,
25	"Shane Harper"	Bruce Leddy	Josh Silverstein & Lanny Horn	March 4, 2012	320	2.34
Shane Harper performs "One Step Closer". Special guest: Shane Harper Sketches: Danceformers, Go Fish The Movie, Do The Angus!, Big Hand Guy, So Random! Story Book Remix: The Giving Tree
26	"Destinee & Paris"	Ron Moseley	Rachel Spratt	March 25, 2012	323	2.14
Destinee & Paris performs "True Love" Special Guest: Destinee & Paris Sketches: JamTron, I'm Going To Marry Zach Feldman Show III, The Back Up Singers III, Serious Bandz

== Recurring sketches ==
- Angus: Supermodel from Down Under – An Australian Shin Model who gets into people's personal spaces.
- Braggy Benson – A segment about a kid who brags about something bad happening to him.
- Chilly Slab Ice Cream Shop – Chilly Slab Ice-Cream Shop is the ice cream shop that celebrates whenever a customer leaves a tip.
- Crazy Carson's Lost and Found – A student called Crazy Carson makes advertisements about everything being free at the lost and found.
- Dr. Goldstein – A segment about a dentist.
- Harry Potter in the Real World – After saving the world many times (but it also states that it's because they ran out of movies), Harry Potter takes on the challenges of the Real World by trying to get a job and pulling off magic spells that don't work.
- M.C. Grammar – A rapper who rhymes grammatically corrects people while he raps while he is chased by two gang members. He is a spoof of MC Hammer.
- Nolan – A French-speaking hand who gives advice.
- Puppy Playdate – Two dimwitted girls named Victoria and Lyla go on a playdate with their dogs with conversations between them end up insulting other people.
- Rufus: Kid with Excuses – A boy named Rufus tends to come up with different excuses to evade getting into trouble much to the chagrin of Principal Zaniya and Teacher Joanne. Some of these excuses end up being true.
- Raised by Beavers – A buck-toothed girl named Becky was raised by Beavers and tries to hide the fact from anyone she meets.
- Sally Jensen: Kid Lawyer – A lawyer named Sally Jensen helps a different child when it comes to whatever wrongful act someone has done to them, with said someone being locked up in jail.
- Simple Country Boy – A country boy with no background story happens to know how to handle any type of situation.
- Possibly Sarcastic Skip – A boy who's misunderstood by people by his sarcasm.
- So Random's Inappropriate Places for a Flash Mob – This segment shows the inappropriate places for people to start a Flash Mob.
- So Random! Storybook Remix – A segment detailing remixed versions of classic stories.
- Tantrum Girl – A girl named Tantrum Girl tends to lose her temper at specific things when talking about something else.
- Tales from the FBI: Fairytale Bureau Investigation - Once upon many times, there can arise a situation, that requires a visit from the Fairytale Bureau of Investigation.
- Teachers, Don't Try to Be Cool – A teacher named Mr. Goodman tries to fit in with his students and acts as if he doesn't play by the rules. This usually gets him hurt though.
- Teen Rage – Three teenagers created a band called Teen Rage against Parents and Teachers.
- The Anime Brothers – Scott and Elliot Kravitz (both dressed as parodies of Goku and Naruto Uzumaki) are two crazy teens who are obsessed with Anime cartoons and act as if they are in the cartoons.
- The Back Up Singers – A nerdy girl named Janice has two back-up singers who help her get through life upon her mother hiring them for a Back To School present. The Back up Singers used to work for J. Lo.
- The Biggest Loser Ruins Your Meal - Two trainers from The Biggest Loser runs and ruins your meal.
- The I'm Going To Marry Zach Feldman Show – Julia Peters is an insane girl who runs a web show about Zach Feldman who she is obsessed with, much to his chagrin.
- The Platowski Brothers – Two singers named Dwayne and Calvin Platowski sing about sibling rivalry and how much they hate each other.
- The Real Princesses of New Jersey – Three princesses who are stuck-up and from New Jersey re-live fairy tales in modern day.
- The Coolest Kid in School – The Coolest Kid in School spoofs The Most Interesting Man in the World commercials.
- The Sparrow Family – This sketch details with a family of sparrows with one of them being a sparrow version of Jack Sparrow.
- Volde-Mart – This segment deals with a store that is owned by Lord Voldemort.
- Wheel of Fortune – Pat Sajak tries to host special edition versions of Wheel of Fortune, but the guests never get through the round because they are too distracted.
- Zombie Man – Andy is friends with a zombie named Zombie Man who tends to eat those close to him, much to his chagrin.

== Broadcast ==
The series premiered on Disney Channel on June 5, 2011 and on Family Channel on June 10, 2011. It premiered on July 27, 2011 on Disney Channel (Australia and New Zealand) and on October 31, 2011 on Disney Channel (UK and Ireland).

=== Video on demand ===
The series became available to stream on Disney+ on April 3, 2020, however it was listed as season 3 of Sonny with a Chance, instead of as a separate series. On July 14, 2021, both series were separated on the platform.

== Critical reception ==
The series's premiere had mixed reviews. Emily Ashby of Common Sense Media gave the series four out of five stars, writing, "Sonny spin-off offers family-friendly sketch comedy, an excellent choice for families".

== Music ==
- So Random! – Brandon Mychal Smith
- "Socks with Sandals" by Footy Scent featuring Hush Puppy – Doug Brochu featuring Brandon Mychal Smith
- "Schooled by Grammar" by MC Grammar – Brandon Mychal Smith featuring Tiffany Thornton, Shayne Topp and Sterling Knight
- "Bracey Girrlz Rap" by Bracey Girrlz – Allisyn Ashley Arm and Grace Bannon featuring Brandon Mychal Smith and Damien Haas with a voice by Audrey Whitby
- "Ketchup on Everything" by Tomatow Sue and the Posse – Allisyn Ashley Arm featuring Brandon Mychal Smith and Doug Brochu
- "Candy Pants" by Footy Scent featuring Hush Puppy – Doug Brochu featuring Brandon Mychal Smith
- "The Gift of Grammar" by MC Grammar feat. Typo and Dr. Dreidel – Brandon Mychal Smith feat. Shayne Topp, Sterling Knight, Tiffany Thornton and Allisyn Ashley Arm
- "Do the Angus" by Angus feat. Gila – Matthew Scott Montgomery feat. Tiffany Thornton
- "I'm Your Jamtron" by Jamtron – Damien Haas
