= Cartoon violence (disambiguation) =

Cartoon violence is the representation of violent actions involving animated characters and situations.

Cartoon violence may also refer to:

- Cartoon Violence (album), a 2012 album by the indie rock band Herzog
- a dimension of Cartoon physics
- a content descriptor used by the Entertainment Software Rating Board
- a rating category of The Independent Game Rating System
- a reaction to the Jyllands-Posten Muhammad cartoons controversy
