= Eric Dean Seaton =

American director and producer

- Born: Cleveland, Ohio, U.S.
- Education: Ohio State University
- Occupations: Television director, producer
- Years active: 1995–present
- Website: ericdeanseaton.com

Eric Dean Seaton is an American television director, producer and graphic novelist.

Seaton was born in Cleveland, Ohio. After graduating from Ohio State University, he moved to California and quickly climbed the assistant director ladder on television shows such as Fox's Living Single and Disney Channel's That's So Raven. In 2004, Seaton made his professional directorial debut on That's So Raven. Since then, he has directed episodes for several other series, including Cory in the House, True Jackson, VP, Sonny with a Chance, Good Luck Charlie, The Suite Life on Deck, I'm in the Band, Shake It Up, Imagination Movers, How to Rock, Jessie, A.N.T. Farm, Austin & Ally, Nicky, Ricky, Dicky & Dawn, Bella and the Bulldogs, The Thundermans, Raven's Home, Knight Squad, The Flash, and Supergirl.

== Filmography ==
Year	Title	Role	Note(s)
1995	In the House	First Stage Manager	
1998–99	Smart Guy	Stage Manager	22 episodes
1998	Kenan & Kel	Second Stage Manager	Episode: "You Dirty Rat"
1999–2000	The Amanda Show	Swiss Guy	3 episodes
2000	Girlfriends	Second Assistant Director	2 episodes
2002	The Jamie Kennedy Experiment	Stage Manager	
2003–07	That's So Raven	Stage Manager/Director	76 episodes
2003–04	The Tracy Morgan Show	Second Assistant Director	2 episodes
2005–06	The Suite Life of Zack & Cody	Stage Manager/Director	2 episodes
2006	Eve	Director	Episode: "Diva Day Care"
2006	Hannah Montana	First Assistant Director	Episode: "Lilly, Do You Want to Know a Secret?"
2007–08	Cory in the House	First Assistant Director/Director	10 episodes
2008	Just Jordan	Director	Episode: "Cool Guys Don't Wear Periwinkle"
2009–10	Sonny with a Chance	Director	31 episodes
2009	True Jackson, VP	Director	Episode: "Switcheroo"
2009–10	The Wannabes Starring Chevy	Co-Executive Producer/Director	25 episodes
2009	MacKenzie Falls	Director	10 episodes
2010	Good Luck Charlie	Director	11 episodes
2010–11	The Suite Life on Deck	Director	4 episodes
2010–13	Pair of Kings	Director	6 episodes
2011	Shake It Up	Director	3 episodes
2011	Let's Stay Together	Director	2 episodes
2011–12	So Random!	Director	12 episodes
2011–12	Kickin' It	Director	10 episodes
2011	Imagination Movers	Director	Episode: "Castaways"
2011	I'm in the Band	Director	Episode: "Pain Games"
2011	Reed Between the Lines	Director	2 episodes
2012	How to Rock	Director	6 episodes
2012–15	Austin & Ally	Director	11 episodes
2012	Sketchy	Director	Episode: "Bourne Again"
2012	Jessie	Director	2 episodes
2012	Bad Fairy	Director	TV movie
2012–13	Marvin Marvin	Director	7 episodes
2013	Calvin and Freddie's Encounters	Producer/Director	10 episodes
2013–15	The Haunted Hathaways	Director	7 episodes
2013	Dog with a Blog	Director	Episode: "Avery's Wild Party"
2013	Mighty Med	Director	3 episodes
2013	A.N.T. Farm	Director	Episode: "FinANTial Crisis"
2014–15	Undateable	Director	3 episodes
2014	Crash & Bernstein	Director	Episode: "Monkey Business"
2014	The Worst Show on the Web	Himself (guest)	Episode: "An Interview with TV Director & Comic Book Creator Eric Dean Stanton"
2014–18	Nicky, Ricky, Dicky & Dawn	Director	19 episodes
2015	Ground Floor	Director	Episode: "The Proposal – Part One"
2015	Bella and the Bulldogs	Director	4 episodes
2015–18	The Thundermans	Director	12 episodes
2015	Legend of the Mantamaji	Writer/Producer/Director/Executive Producer	Short
2015	Truth Be Told	Director	Episode: "Love Thy Neighbor"
2016	Here We Go Again	Director	6 episodes
2016	Dr. Ken	Director	2 episodes
2016–17	School of Rock	Director	2 episodes
2017–18	Stuck in the Middle	Director	2 episodes
2017–19	Life in Pieces	Director	4 episodes
2017–18	Mech-X4	Director	6 episodes
2017–18	Raven's Home	Director	5 episodes
2017–18	Marlon	Director	3 episodes
2018	The Mick	Director	2 episodes
2018–23	Grown-ish	Director	6 episodes
2018	Knight Squad	Director	2 episodes
2018	Superior Donuts	Director	Episode: "Balls and Streaks"
2018–19	Modern Family	Director	4 episodes
2018	The Cool Kids	Director	Episode: "Sid Comes Out"
2018–19	Prince of Peoria	Director	4 episodes
2018	Champaign ILL	Director	2 episodes
2019	Cousins for Life	Director	Episode: "This Little Piggy Went to the Market"
2019	Family Reunion	Director	13 episodes
2019	No Good Nick	Director	3 episodes
2019–20	Black-ish	Director	3 episodes
2019–21	Supergirl	Director	2 episodes
2019	Greenleaf	Director	Episode: "Surprise!"
2019–21	The Goldbergs	Director	4 episodes
2019	Mad About You	Director	3 episodes
2020–21	American Housewife	Director	2 episodes
2020–21	The Flash	Director	3 episodes
2020	Indebted	Director	Episode: "Everybody's Talking About Pleasure"
2020	The Big Show Show	Director	Episode: "The Big Decision"
2020	Schooled	Director	Episode: "CB Saves the Planet"
2021	Legacies	Director	Episode: "Goodbyes Sure Do Suck"
2021	Batwoman	Director	Episode: "Time Off for Good Behavior"
2021	Superman & Lois	Director	Episode: "Loyal Subjekts"
2021	Legends of Tomorrow	Director	2 episodes
2022	Batwoman	Director	Episode: "We're All Mad Here"
2022–24	All American: Homecoming	Director	3 episodes
2022	The Cleaning Lady	Director	Episode: "Lolo & Lala"
2022	The Rookie: Feds	Director	Episode: "Felicia"
2023–25	Will Trent	Director	3 episodes
2023	Gotham Knights	Director	Episode: "Dark Knight of the Soul"
2023	Titans	Director	Episode: "Dude, Where's My Gar?"
2025	High Potential	Director	Episode: "Chutes and Murders"
