= Steve Marmel =

American television writer and producer (born 1964)

- Born: December 17, 1964 (age 61) Lincolnwood, Illinois, U.S.
- Occupation: Television writer, producer, stand-up comedian
- Years active: 1983–present

Steven L. Marmel (born December 17, 1964) is an American television writer, producer, and stand-up comedian who has worked on many animated television series, including The Fairly OddParents, Cow and Chicken, I Am Weasel, Danny Phantom, Family Guy and Yin Yang Yo!. During his work on The Fairly OddParents, he frequently co-wrote episodes with creator Butch Hartman. Marmel also created the live-action series Sonny with a Chance, So Random as well as the series Mech-X4.

== Career ==
Marmel had been a stand-up comedian since the age of 18, and was discovered while performing in 1996 by a Hanna-Barbera executive who thought he'd be ideal as a writer for Johnny Bravo. He has since worked on numerous other shows for Hanna-Barbera, Nickelodeon, and Disney Channel, and has been nominated for multiple Emmy and Annie Awards for his work as a writer, producer, and songwriter. He has also been noted by the conservative magazine The American Spectator for his animated TV series This Just In!

== Personal life ==
Marmel grew up in Lincolnwood, Illinois and is an alumnus of the University of Wisconsin, where he majored in journalism. Marmel and his wife currently reside in Los Angeles.

== Television work ==
=== Animated series ===
- Johnny Bravo (1996–97) (staff writer: story & teleplay)
- Cow and Chicken (1997–98) (staff writer)
- I Am Weasel (1997–99) (staff writer)
- Monster Farm (1998) (writer)
- Oh Yeah! Cartoons (1998–99) (prop designer & writer)
- Ace Ventura: Pet Detective (1999) (writer)
- Family Guy (1999) (punch-up guy)
- The Fairly OddParents (2001–06) (producer, story editor, writer)
- The Adventures of Jimmy Neutron: Boy Genius (2002) (writer)
- ChalkZone (2002) (writer) & (producer) (2003–08)
- Danny Phantom (2004–07) (developer, producer, story editor, writer)
- This Just In (2004) (creator, writer & executive producer)
- Yin Yang Yo! (2006–09) (story, dialogue director, writer & producer)
- Family Guy (2013–14) (writer & producer)

=== Live-action series ===
- Jeff Dunham: Spark of Insanity (2007, TV special) (producer)
- Sonny with a Chance (2009–11) (creator, writer & executive producer)
- So Random! (2011–12) (creator, writer & executive producer)
- Jeff Dunham: Minding the Monsters (2012, TV special) (producer)
- Red Light Comedy: Live From Amsterdam (2012) (consulting producer)
- Mech-X4 (2016–18) (creator, writer & executive producer)
- Pup Academy (2019) (creative consultant)

=== Stand-up comedy ===
- The Tonight Show with Jay Leno (3 episodes in 2004)

== Film work ==
- Achmed Saves America (2014, TV movie) (writer)
- Smosh: The Movie (2015, adventure comedy film web film) (writer)
- Darci Lynne: My Hometown Christmas (2018) (additional material)
