= Sonny with a Chance =

2009 American Disney Channel sitcom

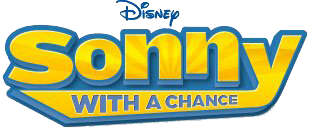
- Genre: Teen sitcom
- Created by: Steve Marmel
- Starring: Demi Lovato; Tiffany Thornton; Sterling Knight; Brandon Mychal Smith; Doug Brochu; Allisyn Ashley Arm
- Opening theme: "So Far So Great" by Demi Lovato
- Composers: Chris Alan Lee; Scott Clausen; Danny Jacob
- Country of origin: United States
- Original language: English
- No. of seasons: 2
- No. of episodes: 47 (list of episodes)

Production
- Executive producers: Brian Robbins; Sharla Sumpter Bridgett; Michael Feldman; Steve Marmel
- Producer: Patty Gary Cox
- Camera setup: Multi-camera
- Production companies: Varsity Pictures; It's a Laugh Productions

Original release
- Network: Disney Channel
- Release: February 8, 2009 – January 2, 2011

Related
- So Random!

Sonny with a Chance is an American teen sitcom created by Steve Marmel that aired on Disney Channel for two seasons between February 2009 and January 2011. The series centers on Sonny Munroe, portrayed by Demi Lovato, a teenage comedian from Wisconsin who joins the cast of a sketch comedy television series titled So Random! after moving to Hollywood, Los Angeles. Episodes deal with Sonny's attempts to develop relationships with her castmates and establish her role within the group, focusing on her life working on the show's set, as well as coming to terms with her newfound fame. The main themes depicted include the focus on friendships and adolescence. The series also stars Tiffany Thornton, Sterling Knight, Brandon Mychal Smith, Doug Brochu and Allisyn Ashley Arm. Sonny with a Chance also contains fully produced comedy sketches from the show-within-a-show. These elements draw inspiration from the Nickelodeon series All That, which executive producers Brian Robbins and Sharla Sumpter Bridgett previously worked on, as well as 30 Rock.

The Walt Disney Company commissioned the series to follow its successful comedy programs of the 2000s, including Hannah Montana and Wizards of Waverly Place, starring Miley Cyrus and Selena Gomez respectively. Lovato was cast to continue her (Note: Lovato uses both she/her and they/them pronouns. This article uses she/her pronouns for consistency.) affiliation with the network after her role in the television film Camp Rock (2008) and the release of music through Disney-owned label Hollywood Records. This cross-promotion was intended to mirror that of Cyrus and Gomez. Varsity Pictures and It's a Laugh Productions produced the program, and it premiered on Disney Channel on February 8, 2009. Sonny with a Chance experienced high viewership in the United States on broadcast television. The series did not receive wide critical coverage. It last aired on January 2, 2011; both seasons have been distributed through digital download and on the Disney+ streaming service.

Initially renewed for a third season, the series' future became uncertain when Lovato underwent treatment for personal struggles in November 2010 and was unable to continue filming for the show. The season entered production without Lovato, with a focus on the elements of the show-within-a-show (sketches, musical performances, and guest stars) as a temporary solution until her return. After it was reported that Lovato would not return to the series in April 2011, the episodes which had been produced were rebranded as the spin-off series So Random!, which aired for one season from 2011 to 2012.

== Premise ==
Sonny Munroe is a cheerful and ambitious 15-year-old from Wisconsin who has experienced success by uploading comedic videos to the internet. After she is discovered in a nationwide casting call, she moves to Hollywood, Los Angeles, to join the cast of a popular sketch comedy series for teenagers titled So Random!. The series centers on Sonny's life working on the program as well as her home life. She comes to terms with the difficulties of working on a television set alongside her castmates, in particular the self-centered Tawni Hart, who is unkind to Sonny. The So Random! cast also includes the suave Nico Harris and his best friend Grady Mitchell, as well as the cunning Zora Lancaster. Comedy sketches from So Random! are included within the series. The cast of So Random! work at the same television studio as their rival television program, Mackenzie Falls, a drama series which stars the teen idol Chad Dylan Cooper. Sonny with a Chance explores the portrayal of a teenager with an ambitious dream, in the same style as other teen series such as Hannah Montana and iCarly. The theme of following dreams is recognized as a prominent attribute of shows produced by Disney Channel.

== Characters ==
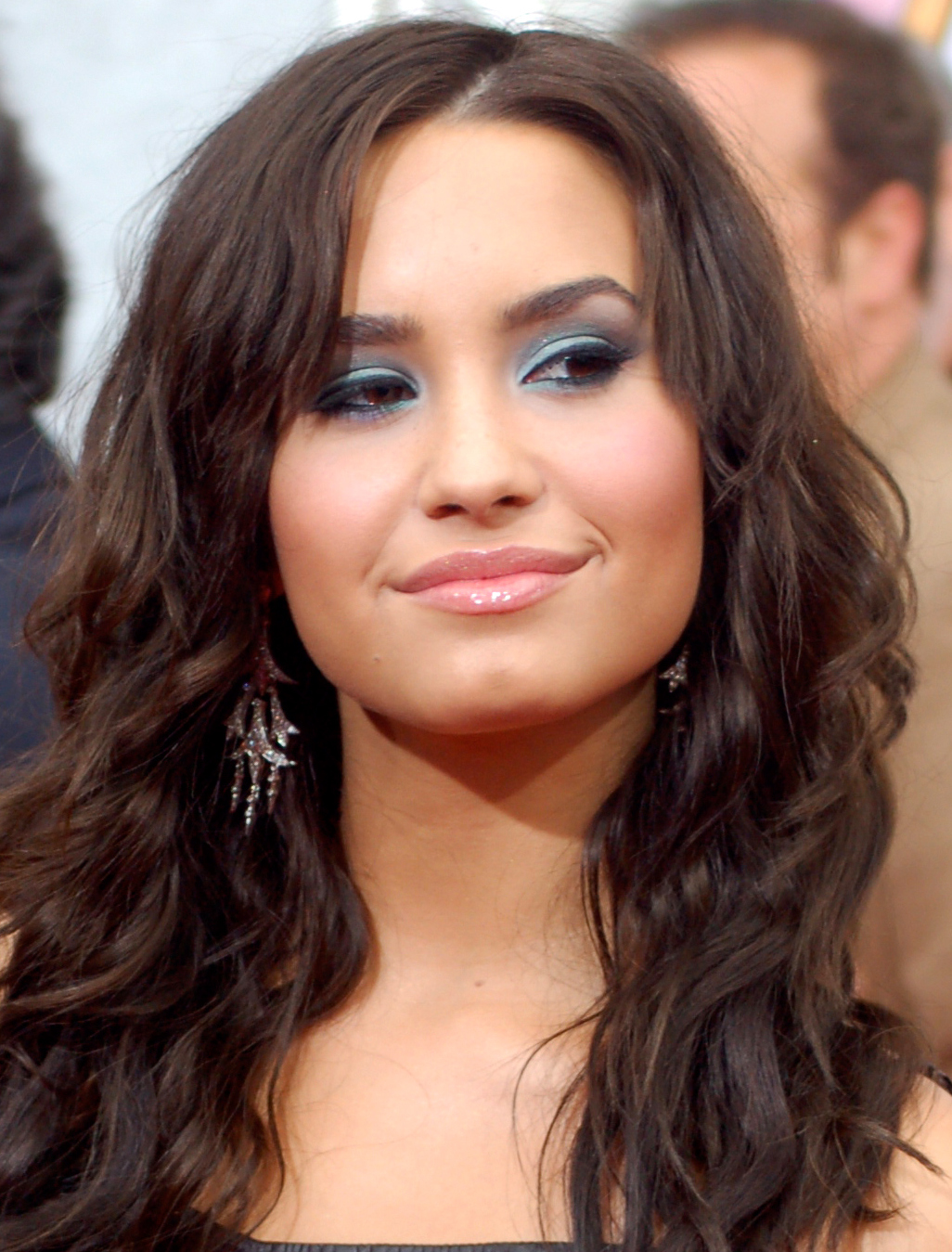
Demi Lovato (pictured in 2009) plays Sonny Munroe.

- Sonny Munroe (Demi Lovato), a friendly and well-intentioned 15-year-old from Wisconsin with a passion for comedy and writing music. She joins the cast of So Random!.
- Tawni Hart (Tiffany Thornton), a self-absorbed cast member of So Random!, who is known as a diva and is initially unkind toward Sonny, but later becomes her close friend
- Chad Dylan Cooper (Sterling Knight), a teen idol who stars on Mackenzie Falls—the rival series of So Random!—who is arrogant and egotistical but ultimately develops a romantic relationship with Sonny
- Nico Harris (Brandon Mychal Smith), a suave cast member of So Random! and the best friend of Grady
- Grady Mitchell (Doug Brochu), a brainless and funny cast member of So Random! and the best friend of Nico
- Zora Lancaster (Allisyn Ashley Arm), the youngest cast member of So Random!, who is intelligent and cunning

Credits adapted from D23.

== Production ==
=== Development ===
The series was officially announced in May 2008 as a half-hour live-action comedy entitled Welcome to Mollywood, in which the title character would be called Molly. It was set to premiere during the 2008–09 television season. Gary Marsh, the president of Disney Channels Worldwide, identified the idea of "following your dream" as a core attribute of Disney Channel which would be present in the series. He described the series as a "hybrid show"; fully produced comedy sketches from the show-within-a-show So Random! would also appear. Another working title for the series was Welcome to Holliwood. The Los Angeles Times's Robert Lloyd speculated that the final title, Sonny with a Chance, makes reference to the phrase "chance of rain".

Sonny with a Chance was created by Steve Marmel, who had previously written for and produced cartoons. Brian Robbins served as an executive producer on the series; he was the co-creator of the Nickelodeon sketch comedy series All That. Sharla Sumpter Bridgett, who also worked on All That, joined the series as an executive producer; Robbins and Bridgett's joint production company, Varsity Pictures, produced the program alongside It's a Laugh Productions in association with the network. Michael Feldman was an executive producer. The premise of the show was also influenced by 30 Rock.

=== Casting ===
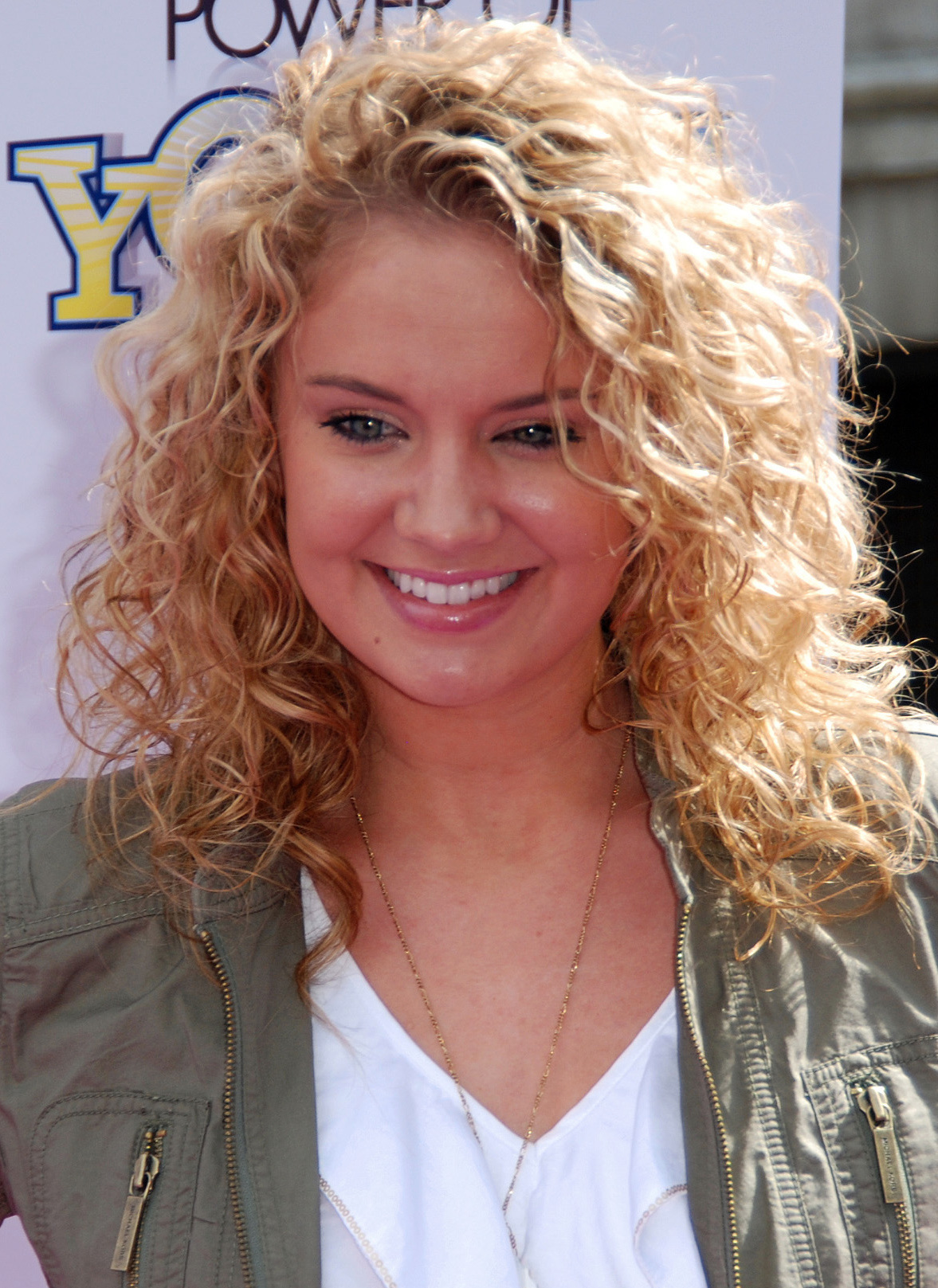
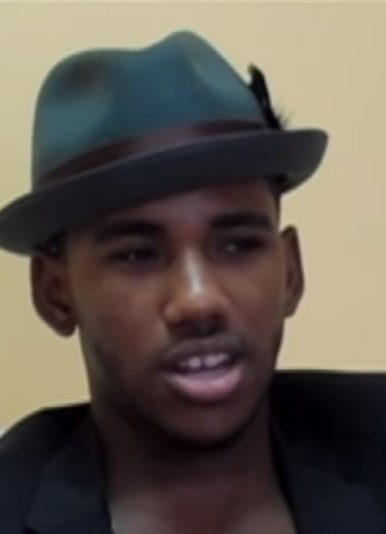
Tiffany Thornton (left, 2010) and Brandon Mychal Smith (right, 2011) portrayed two of Sonny's colleagues, Tawni Hart and Nico Harris respectively, throughout the series.

Demi Lovato portrays the central character of Sonny Munroe; the character was originally named Molly, and later Holli. Lovato's affiliation with the network began with her lead role in the series As the Bell Rings and continued with her breakout role in the musical television film Camp Rock, which debuted in 2008 and was originally designed as a vehicle for the Jonas Brothers. Lovato had auditioned for both Camp Rock and Sonny with a Chance simultaneously in the summer of 2007 and secured both roles; (Note: At the time, Lovato was auditioned by Disney for "a few upcoming TV pilots". Lovato was discovered at a casting call in Texas.) Marsh described her as a "gifted comedian". Lovato's work in the company continued with her debut album Don't Forget, released by the Disney-owned label Hollywood Records in 2008. She also filmed the television film Princess Protection Program alongside fellow Disney Channel star Selena Gomez, and she toured with the Jonas Brothers before Sonny with a Chance premiered. Lovato's cross-promotion within the network followed that of predecessors Miley Cyrus and Gomez, but it differed in that her movie and album came before her leading role in a sitcom. Lovato sings the series' theme song, "So Far So Great". Fellow Disney actor Bridgit Mendler had also auditioned for the role of Sonny before Lovato won the role.

The remaining main cast members were revealed in May 2008: Tiffany Thornton as Tawni Hart, Brandon Mychal Smith as Nico Harris, Doug Brochu as Grady Mitchell and Allisyn Ashley Arm as Zora Lancaster. The series also stars Sterling Knight as Chad Dylan Cooper. Nancy McKeon, who had been a teenage actor herself, recurs as Sonny's mother, Connie Munroe.

=== Writing and filming ===
Production began in September 2008. Marmel and Feldman wrote the original, unaired pilot, which was directed by Lee Shallat Chemel. The series debuted on February 8, 2009. Sonny with a Chance was renewed for a second season on June 1, 2009. Marsh stated that the episodes would include more comedy and the addition of music.

=== Lovato's departure and So Random! ===
In November 2010, Disney Channel indicated that production on the third season, which was scheduled to begin in January 2011, would be dependent on Lovato, who was reported to be experiencing "mental health issues". This followed her withdrawing from a Jonas Brothers tour and entering a treatment facility for "emotional and physical issues". Later that month, the network made public their plan to begin production on the season without Lovato, reworking the premise to focus on the So Random! sketches. The writers planned for the third season to feature sketch comedy, musical performances, and guest stars as a temporary solution until Lovato returned. Standalone So Random! episodes had been tried during the show's second season, and network executives were pleased with the performance of these episodes, which led to the decision to rework the program for its third season. Months into the season's production, in April 2011, People reported that Lovato would not be returning to Sonny with a Chance and that So Random! would continue. Lovato stated that she would be focusing on her music career as well as her recovery; the network supported the decision. The episodes which had been produced during this time formed the first season of the spin-off So Random!, which premiered in June 2011, and it aired until March 2012.

== Series overview ==
Season	Episodes	Originally released	
Season	Episodes	First released	Last released
1	21	February 8, 2009	November 22, 2009
2	26	March 14, 2010	January 2, 2011

== Reception ==
=== Critical reception ===
Sonny with a Chance did not receive wide critical coverage. Lloyd stated that the show-within-a-show So Random! possesses an authenticity which Sonny with a Chance does not achieve. He described the set as "violently designed" and with "riots of colour"; Natalie Finn of E! referred to the colour palette of the show as "eye-popping". Finn described the actors' performances as exaggerated, while Lloyd praised Lovato's acting ability as "very good". Kelvin Cedeno from DVDizzy.com said that the series has an "outrageous tone" and feels more like a Nickelodeon show, rather than a product of Disney Channel. He wrote that the series does not feature a lesson in each episode and that it is not funny. Emily Ashby wrote for Common Sense Media that the series does not attempt to promote lessons or positive messages. However, she continued that Sonny's confidence and leadership qualities make her a worthwhile role model.

=== U.S. television ratings ===
Viewership and ratings per season of Sonny with a Chance
Season	Episodes	First aired		Last aired		Avg. viewers (millions)
Season	Episodes	Date	Viewers (millions)	Date	Viewers (millions)	Avg. viewers (millions)
1	21	February 8, 2009	4.1	November 22, 2009	3.7	3.87
2	26	March 14, 2010	6.3	January 2, 2011	3.71	4.01

=== Awards and nominations ===
List of awards and nominations received by Sonny with a Chance
Award	Year	Recipient(s) and nominee(s)	Category	Result	Ref.
ALMA Award	2011	Demi Lovato	Favorite TV Actress – Leading Role in a Comedy	Won	
Nickelodeon Kids' Choice Awards (Australia)	2009	Sonny with a Chance	Favorite Comedy Show	Nominated	
Nickelodeon Kids' Choice Awards (United States)	2010	Sonny with a Chance	Favorite TV Show	Nominated	
Teen Choice Awards	2009	Demi Lovato	Choice TV: Breakout Star Female	Won	
Teen Choice Awards	2010	Sonny with a Chance	Choice TV Show: Comedy	Nominated	
Teen Choice Awards	2010	Demi Lovato	Choice TV Actress: Comedy	Nominated	
Teen Choice Awards	2010	Sterling Knight	Choice TV Actor: Comedy	Nominated	
Teen Choice Awards	2011	Demi Lovato	Choice TV Actress: Comedy	Nominated	
Young Artist Awards	2010	Allisyn Ashley Arm	Best Performance In A TV Series (Comedy or Drama) – Supporting Young Actress	Nominated	

== Other media ==
Walt Disney Records released a soundtrack album for the series on October 5, 2010, including songs from, and inspired by, the series. Disney Interactive Studios released a video game based on the series for the Nintendo DS, Sonny with a Chance, in 2010. The video game is composed of over 40 minigames inspired by the plots of episodes and So Random! sketches. Characters and locations from the series are also featured. A DVD compilation entitled Sonny's Big Break was released on August 25, 2009. The release contains four previously aired episodes, one unreleased episode and bonus features including a clip from Mackenzie Falls.
