= Carl Lauten =

Television director, yoga teacher

- Occupations: Television director, yoga teacher
- Years active: 1977-present

Carl Lauten is an American television director, associate director and yoga teacher.

== Career ==
In 1977, Lauten began his career as a stage manager on the sitcom Soap. He has also associate directed for The Cosby Show, You Again?, ALF, The Mommies, Spin City, That's So Raven, Hope & Faith, Cory in the House and Sonny with a Chance. In addition to taking over as head director for the some of aforementioned sitcoms, he also directed episodes of Taina, Clarissa Explains It All and The Suite Life on Deck.

In 1985, he won a Directors Guild of America Award for directorial work on The Cosby Show.

Lauten is also yoga instructor and yoga video director. During the early 2000s, he directed a number of yoga and pilates videos.
