= Tiffany Thornton =

American actress, radio personality and singer (born 1986)

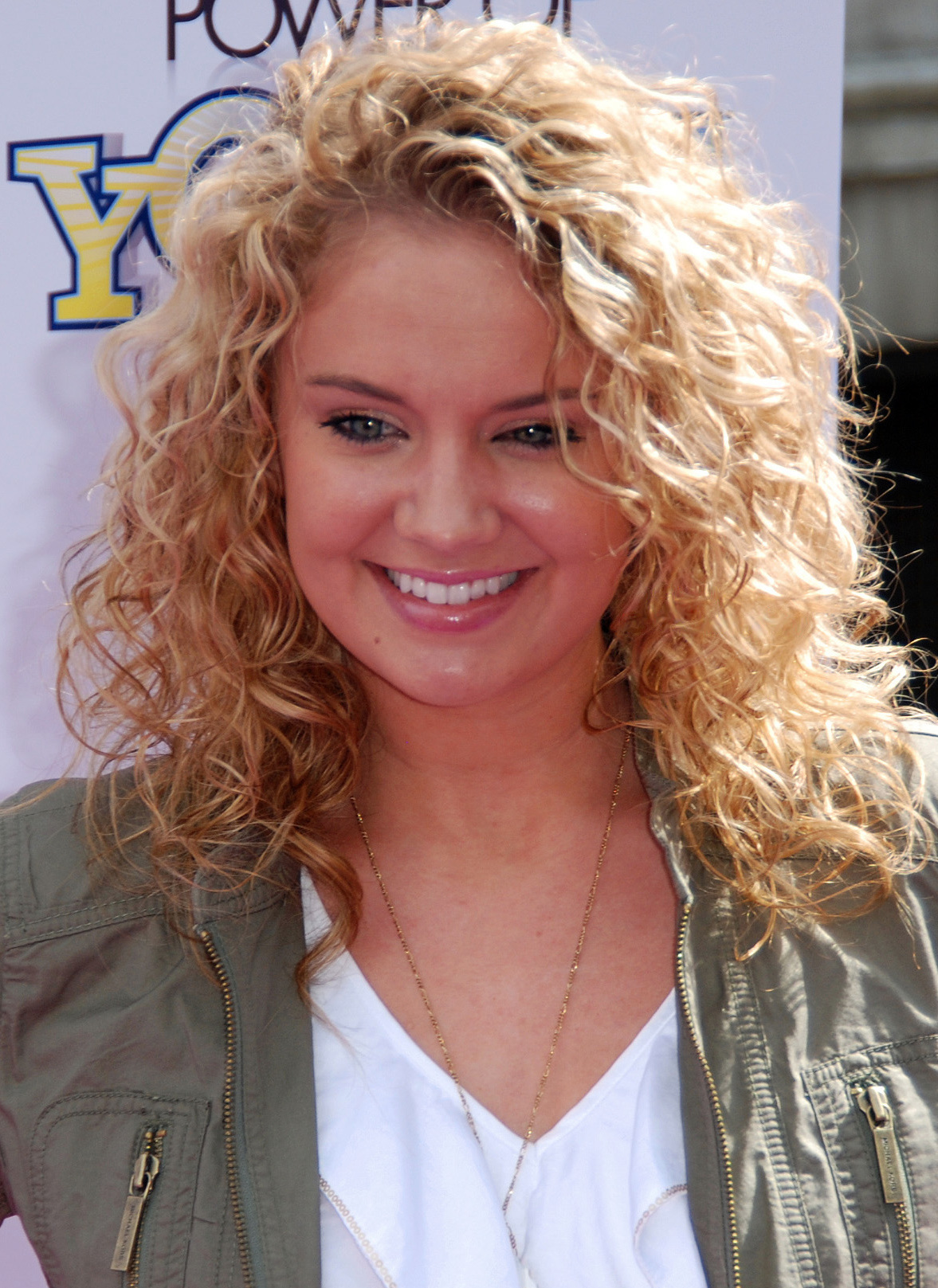
- Thornton in 2010
- Born: Tiffany Dawn Thornton; February 14, 1986 (age 40); College Station, Texas, U.S.
- Occupations: Actress, radio personality, singer
- Years active: 2003–2016
- Spouses: Chris Carney (m. 2011; died 2015) Josiah Capaci (m. 2017)
- Children: 4

Tiffany Dawn Thornton (born February 14, 1986) is an American former actress, radio personality and singer best known for her co-starring role as Tawni Hart on the Disney Channel Original Series, Sonny with a Chance and in its spin-off/sketch series, So Random!.

== Career ==
Thornton made her television acting debut in the pilot episode of the Fox sitcom, Quintuplets. She then went on to appear in 8 Simple Rules, American Dreams, The O.C., Desperate Housewives, That's So Raven, Jericho, Wizards of Waverly Place and Hannah Montana.

In 2009, Thornton co-starred as Tawni Hart on the Disney Channel Original Series Sonny with a Chance and then went on to play a part in the Disney Channel Original Movie Hatching Pete. After Sonny with a Chance ended its second season in early 2011, it was rebranded by the network as So Random!, as a spin-off/sketch series due to the departure of lead star Demi Lovato to attend rehab, and premiered in early summer 2011 and ended in 2012, where Thornton reprised her role as Tawni Hart.

From 2015 to 2016, Thornton was a radio personality for KLAZ 105.9 based in Hot Springs, Arkansas. She co-hosted the morning show "Kramer and Tiffany", as well as hosted her own mid-day show. She is also a blogger for DisneyBaby.com.

As of mid-2016, Thornton works as a recruitment advisor for Champion Christian College.

== Personal life ==
Thornton was born in College Station, Texas. She is an alumna of Texas A&M University, where she sang the national anthem at a number of sporting events. She is a Christian.

In December 2009, Thornton became engaged to her boyfriend, Christopher Carney, a probation officer and former lead singer of the band The Prom Kings. The couple were married on November 12, 2011, at Garvan Woodland Gardens, in Hot Springs National Park in Hot Springs, Arkansas. Thornton gave birth to her and Carney's first child, a son, on August 14, 2012. The child's godparents are actors Cassandra Scerbo and Wilmer Valderrama. Their second son was born on March 1, 2014. On December 4, 2015, Carney was killed in a car accident.

In January 2017, Thornton began a relationship with family friend and worship pastor Josiah Capaci. The couple announced their engagement on April 8, 2017. They were married on October 7, 2017. They have two daughters, born on November 9, 2018, and July 21, 2021, respectively.

== Filmography ==
Film
Year	Title	Role	Notes
2009	Boo!	Unknown	Short film
2013	Unlucky Charms	Audrey	
2014	The Dog Who Saved Easter	Karen	

Television
Year	Title	Role	Notes
2004	Quintuplets	Stacy	Pilot episode
2004	8 Simple Rules	Marnie	Episode: "Car Trouble?
2005	American Dreams	Tonya	2 episodes
2005	The O.C.	Ashley	3 episodes
2006	Desperate Housewives	Barbie	Episode: "No One Is Alone"
2006	That's So Raven	Tyler Sparks	Episode: "Checkin' Out"
2006	Jericho	Stephanie Lancaster	Pilot episode
2007–2008	Hannah Montana	Becky	2 episodes
2007	Wizards of Waverly Place	Susan	Episode: "Movies"
2009–2011	Sonny with a Chance	Tawni Hart	Main cast, Disney Channel Original Series
2009	Hatching Pete	Jamie Wynn	Disney Channel Original Movie
2009	Lights, Camera, Take Action! Backstage with Disney's Friends for Change	Herself / Host	Television special
2010	Fish Hooks	Doris Flores Gorgeous	Voice, episode: "Doris Flores Gorgeous"
2010	Kick Buttowski: Suburban Daredevil	Teena Sometimes	Voice, episode: "And... Action!"
2011–2012	So Random!	Tawni Hart	Main cast, Disney Channel Original Series
2011	Disney's Friends for Change Games	Herself	Co-host
2011	Pixie Hollow Games	Glimmer	Voice, TV special
2011	PrankStars	Herself	Episode: "Stick It To Me"
2012	Game Change	Meghan McCain	TV film
2012	Doc McStuffins	Xyla	Voice, episode: "One Note Wonder"
2014–2015	Muertoons	Lupita	Voice, main role

== Music ==
=== Songs ===
Year	Song	Album
2009	"Let It Go" (with Mitchel Musso)	Disney Channel Playlist
2009	"Some Day My Prince Will Come"	Snow White and the Seven Dwarfs: Diamond Edition DVD/Blu-ray
2009	"Magic Mirror"	Tinker Bell and the Lost Treasure
2009	"I Believe" (with Kermit the Frog)	
2010	"If I Never Knew You"	DisneyMania 7
2010	"Kiss Me"	Sonny with a Chance
2010	"Sure Feels Like Love"	Sonny with a Chance
2011	"Gift of Grammar"	Gift of Grammar - Single
2012	"Bring Love to Me"	Grafted
2014	"Spotlight" (Ashton Taylor featuring Tiffany Thornton)	Fun In The Sun

=== Music videos ===
Year	Song	Artist
2008	"La La Land"	Demi Lovato
2009	"Someday My Prince Will Come"	Herself
2009	"Let It Go" (with Mitchel Musso)	
2009	"I Believe"	Herself with Kermit the Frog
