= Michael Feldman (writer) =

American television producer and writer

- Occupation(s): Producer, writer
- Years active: 1992–present
- Spouse: Andrea Feldman
- Children: 2

Michael Feldman is an American television producer and writer. Some of his writing credits include The Gregory Hines Show, Everybody Loves Raymond, Temporarily Yours, That's So Raven, Cory in the House as well as producing for Boston Common, Odd Man Out, Yes, Dear and The Weber Show. Feldman was a head writer and executive producer for the Disney Channel sitcom Sonny with a Chance.

== Personal life ==
Feldman currently resides in Los Angeles with his wife, Andrea, and their two sons.
