= Doug Brochu =

American actor, comedian and voice actor (born 1990)

- Born: Douglas Mark Brochu; September 29, 1990 (age 35); Tennessee, U.S.
- Occupations: Actor; comedian; producer
- Years active: 2007–present
- Relatives: Chris Brochu (brother)

Douglas Mark Brochu (born September 29, 1990) is an American actor, comedian and producer. He is best known for his role as Grady Mitchell in the Disney Channel Original Series, Sonny with a Chance (2009–2011) and So Random! (2011–2012).

== Early life ==
Brochu was born in Tennessee, the son of Nita and Michael Brochu. He has an older brother, Chris Brochu, and a younger sister, actress Kaitlyn "Kate" Brochu. When he was 4 years old, Brochu moved to Fayetteville, North Carolina, where he spent most of his childhood, before moving to Tampa, Florida, where he started taking acting classes and doing local theater. In August 2006, he moved to Los Angeles with his family to pursue acting.

== Career ==
Brochu has appeared in stage productions of My Fair Lady, Smokey Mountain Christmas, The Play's the Thing and Forever Broadway. He has also had guest starring roles on Nickelodeon's Zoey 101 and iCarly. Brochu played the main role as Grady Mitchell in Sonny with a Chance and in So Random!. Brochu also played in a special guest role as Oogie in Disney XD's Pair of Kings. In 2011, Brochu was part of Disney's Friends for Change Games, which aired on Disney Channel. After So Random! was cancelled, Brochu hosted AwesomenessTV's web series Shove It, as well as two episodes of How to Be Awesome.

Since then, Brochu has appeared in several short films and theater productions, as well as started the sketch comedy group Burnt Quiche in 2017. In 2018, he starred in the interactive live show Kid Claw on Twitch, playing the titular character.

In 2021, Brochu reprised his role as Duke Lubberman in the iCarly reboot.

== Personal life ==
Brochu's hobbies include reading, writing, playing videogames, playing banjo, blacksmithing, leather-crafting and brewing. From 2012 to 2013, he co-hosted a podcast called Beardomancy 101 with friend Ryan Moran, where they would discuss adventures, comics, movies and geek culture in general.

In 2016, he moved to New York City to start a business, All-Wise Meadery, alongside actor Dylan Sprouse. In September 2016, they started an interactive D&D show called Pug Crawl, which went on until March 2017. The premise consisted of weekly D&D games where viewers would choose which characters and scenarios would be featured. In November 2018, Brochu announced he was leaving All-Wise.

Brochu lives in Columbus, Ohio. He currently works as a live broadcast producer at Esports Engine alongside some of his best friends, including Kid Claw creator Ethan Spencer and Chase Down Podcast co-host Carter Rodriguez.

== Filmography ==
=== Film ===
- Obituaries (2014) as Calvin Roderick
- Winesburg: Death (2015) as Handsome Lover #2
- Mostly Ghostly: Have You Met My Ghoulfriend? (2014) as Senior Jock

=== Television ===
Year	Title	Role	Notes
2007	Zoey 101	Blatzberg	Episode: "Wrestling"
2007–2008	iCarly	Wrestler #1 / Duke Lubberman	3 episodes
2009	The Replacements	Terrance	Voice only; episode: "Injustice Is Blind"
2009–2011	Sonny with a Chance	Grady Mitchell	Main role
2010–2012	Pair of Kings	Oogie	3 episodes
2011	Fish Hooks	Lonnie, the Band Leader	Voice only; episode: "Banned Band"
2011–2012	So Random!	Grady Mitchell	Main role
2011–2012	Kick Buttowski: Suburban Daredevil	Abbie	Voice only; 3 episodes
2012	Snap	Himself	Disney Channel special
2012	Shove It	Himself	Host; 12 episodes
2012	How to Be Awesome	Himself	Host; 2 episodes
2015	Astrid Clover	Douglas	Episode: "Backyard Restaurant"
2017	Apple	Kyle	Main role; sketch by David Ebert
2017–2019	Burnt Quiche	Various characters	5 episodes
2018	Kid Claw	Kid Claw	Main role; 2 episodes; live web series
2019	The Marvelous Mrs. Maisel	Background Actor, Army Man	Uncredited; Episode: "Strike Up the Band"
2020	A Wilderness of Error	Crime Scene Photographer	Episode: "Girl in a Floppy Hat"
2021	iCarly	Duke Lubberman	Episode: "i'M Cursed"

=== Music videos ===
Year	Artist	Title	Role
2007	Lifehouse	"From Where You Are"	
2008	Demi Lovato	"La La Land"	Benny Beverly
