= Brandon Mychal Smith =

American actor and singer (born 1989)

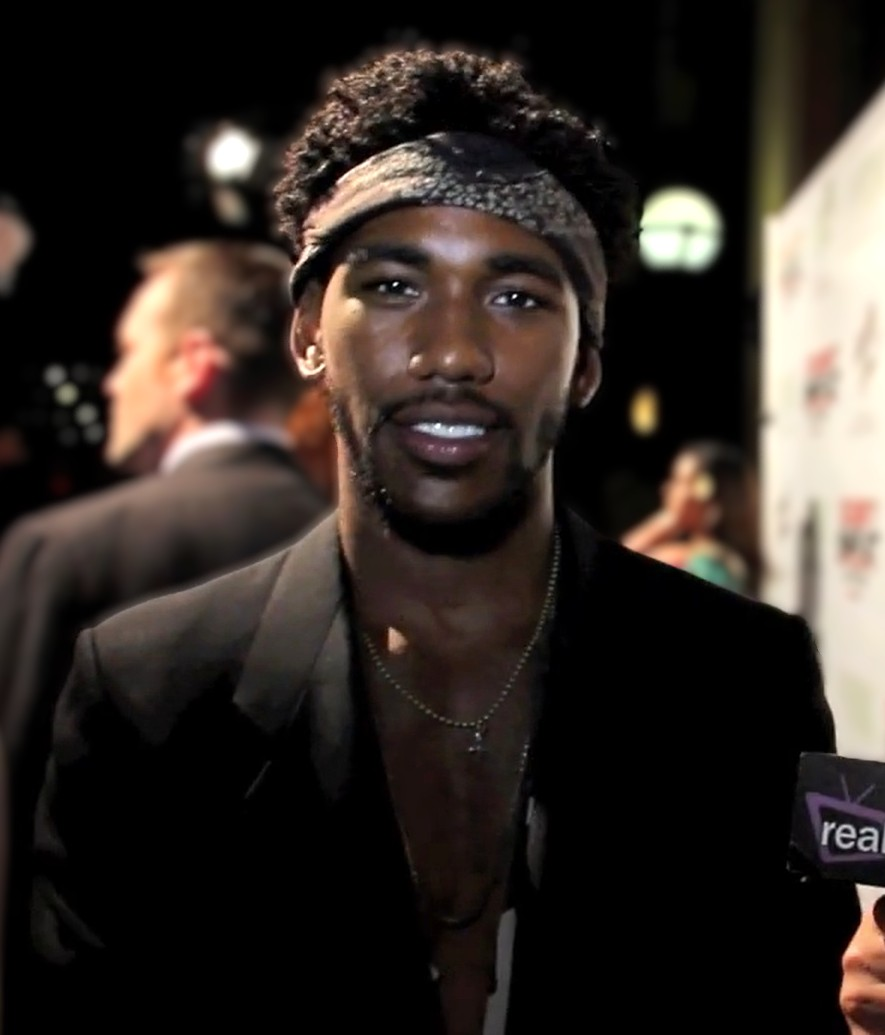
- Smith in 2014
- Born: May 29, 1989 (age 37)
- Other name: Brandon Smith
- Occupations: Actor; comedian; singer; rapper
- Years active: 1999–present

Brandon Mychal Smith (born May 29, 1989) is an American actor and singer. He is best known for playing Bug Wendal in Gridiron Gang, Sam in You're the Worst, Li'l Danny Dawkins in Phil of the Future, Nico Harris in Sonny with a Chance and So Random!, Stubby in Starstruck, Lord of da Bling in Let It Shine, and Marcus in One Big Happy. He received critical acclaim for his portrayal of Tayshawn Mitchell in The Ron Clark Story (2006) and Little Richard in the 2014 James Brown biopic Get on Up. He voiced Michelangelo in the Nickelodeon animated series Rise of the Teenage Mutant Ninja Turtles.

== Career ==
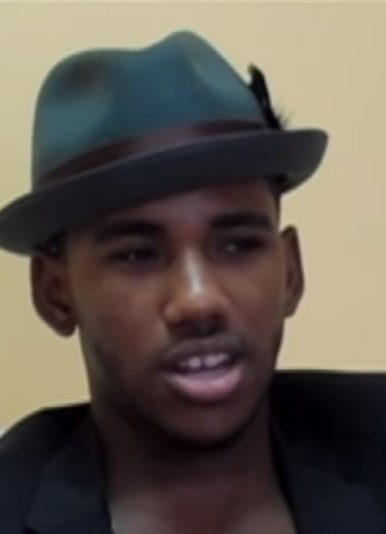
Smith in 2012

Smith won a Family Television Award and Young Artist Award in 2007 for his performance as Tayshawn in The Ron Clark Story. His other credits include the 2006 production of Gridiron Gang as Bug Wendal, and a recurring role as Mario in Unfabulous. He starred in the 2010 Disney Channel Original Movie Starstruck. He also performs the song and music video "Party Up" for Starstruck. He was a competitor on the Dancing with the Stars sequel Skating with the Stars but had to withdraw due to illness. He produced Maxrank's track "Winna Girl".

== Filmography ==
=== Film ===
Year	Title	Role	Notes
1999	She's All That	JV Cleaning Boy	
2003	Grind	Skater	
2006	Gridiron Gang	Bug Wendal	
2007	Weapons	James	
2010	Elle: A Modern Cinderella Tale	TJ	
2014	Sacrifice	Kaz	
2014	Get On Up	Little Richard	
2015	Hoovey	Donavan	
2016	Dirty Grandpa	Tyrone	
2017	The Most Hated Woman in America	Roy Collier	
2021	Horror Noire	Nekani	
2023	Appendage	Kaelin	
2023	Sick Girl	Leo	

=== Television ===
Year	Title	Role	Notes
2002	The District	Darren "Junior" Fox	Episode: "Payback"
2003	Kim Possible	Lamar Harris (voice)	Episode: "Two to Tutor"
2004–2005	Unfabulous	Mario	9 episodes
2005	The Shield	Nathan	Episode: "The Cure"
2005	That's So Raven	Razor	Episode: "Extreme Cory"
2005–2006	Phil of the Future	Danny Dawkins	18 episodes
2006	Without a Trace	Trevor	Episode: "Blood Out"
2006	Lucky Louie	Jason Plumbey	Episode: "A Mugging Story"
2006	Bones	Kid #1	Episode: "The Boy in the Shroud"
2006	All of Us	Deke	2 episodes
2006	The Ron Clark Story	Tayshawn	Television film
2007	Zoey 101	Wrestler	Episode: "Wrestling"
2008	Cory in the House	Robbie Malikiey	Episode: "Uninvited Pest"
2009	The Forgotten	Billy York	Episode: "Football John"
2009–2011	Sonny with a Chance	Nico Harris	Series regular
2010	Starstruck	Albert J. "Stubby" Stubbins	Television film
2011–2012	So Random!	Nico Harris	Series regular
2012	SNAP!	Himself	Host
2012	Let It Shine	Lord of da Bling	Television film
2013	Social Nightmare	Daniel	Television film
2014–2019	You're the Worst	Sam Dresden	19 episodes
2015	One Big Happy	Marcus	6 episodes
2016	Sweet/Vicious	Harris	Series regular
2018–2020	Rise of the Teenage Mutant Ninja Turtles	Mikey (voice)	Series regular
2019	Four Weddings and a Funeral	Craig	Series regular
2022	Rise of the Teenage Mutant Ninja Turtles: The Movie	Mikey (voice)	Television film
2026	The Drop: A Snowfall Saga	Darren "DG" Grant	Series regular

=== Music videos ===
Year	Artist	Title	Role
2008	Demi Lovato	"La La Land"	The Director
2009	Daniel Curtis Lee ft. Adam Hicks	"U Can't Touch This"	Boy
2010	Sterling Knight	"Starstruck"	Stubby
2010	Brandon Mychal Smith	"Party Up"	Himself
