= List of That's So Raven episodes =

The following is a list of episodes of the Disney Channel Original Series, That's So Raven. It ran from January 17, 2003, to November 10, 2007, with 100 episodes produced spanning 4 seasons.

== Series overview ==
Season	Episodes	Originally released	
Season	Episodes	First released	Last released
1	21	January 17, 2003	March 5, 2004
2	22	October 3, 2003	September 24, 2004
3	35	October 1, 2004	January 16, 2006
4	22	February 20, 2006	November 10, 2007

== Episodes ==
=== Season 1 (2003–04) ===
That's So Raven Season 1 episodes
No. overall	No. in season	Title	Directed by	Written by	Original release date	Prod. code	U.S. viewers (millions)
1	1	"Mother Dearest"	Lee Shallat-Chemel	Bob Keyes & Doug Keyes	January 17, 2003	102	3.6
2	2	"Party Animal"	Rich Correll	Dava Savel	January 17, 2003	109	3.3
3	3	"Test of Friendship"	Rich Correll	Bob Keyes & Doug Keyes	January 17, 2003	107	3.5
4	4	"Wake Up, Victor"	Ken Ceizler	Susan Sherman & Edward C. Evans	January 17, 2003	119	3.4
5	5	"A Fish Called Raven"	Fred Savage	Dava Savel & Carla Banks Waddles	January 24, 2003	121	N/A
6	6	"Smell of Victory"	Lee Shallat-Chemel	Laura Perkins-Brittain	January 31, 2003	101	N/A
7	7	"Campaign in the Neck"	Sean McNamara	Beth Seriff & Geoff Tarson	February 7, 2003	114	N/A
8	8	"Saving Psychic Raven"	Sean McNamara	Michael Feldman & Jeff Abugov	February 21, 2003	120	2.5
9	9	"The Parties"	Rich Correll	Jeff Abugov & Michael Feldman	February 28, 2003	116	2.4
10	10	"Ye Olde Dating Game"	Matthew Diamond	Michael Feldman	March 28, 2003	113	N/A
11	11	"Dissin' Cousins"	Rich Correll	Susan Sherman	April 11, 2003	108	2.3
12	12	"Teach Your Children Well"	Tony Singletary	Beth Seriff & Geoff Tarson	May 2, 2003	111	2.1
13	13	"Driven to Insanity"	Matthew Diamond	Dava Savel	May 30, 2003	104	2.7
14	14	"A Dog by Any Other Name"	Gerren Keith	Michael Poryes & Susan Sherman	June 20, 2003	103	N/A
15	15	"Saturday Afternoon Fever"	Matthew Diamond	Chip Keyes	July 11, 2003	106	N/A
16	16	"A Fight at the Opera"	David Kendall	Beth Seriff & Geoff Tarson	August 8, 2003	118	N/A
17	17	"Psychics Wanted"	Sean McNamara	Maria Espada	August 22, 2003	117	N/A
18	18	"If I Only Had a Job"	Rich Correll	Laura Perkins-Brittain & Carla Banks Waddles	September 12, 2003	110	N/A
19	19	"Escape Claus"	Matthew Diamond	Carla Banks Waddles	December 5, 2003	105	4.7
20	20	"Separation Anxiety"	Rich Correll	Dava Savel & Carla Banks Waddles	December 19, 2003	115	N/A
21	21	"To See or Not to See"	Rich Correll	Carla Banks Waddles	March 5, 2004	112	4.4

=== Season 2 (2003–04) ===
That's So Raven Season 2 episodes
No. overall	No. in season	Title	Directed by	Written by	Original release date	Prod. code	U.S. viewers (millions)
22	1	"Out of Control"	Gerren Keith	Sarah Jane Cunningham & Suzie V. Freeman	October 3, 2003	203	N/A
23	2	"Don't Have a Cow"	Rich Correll	Michael Carrington	October 17, 2003	204	N/A
24	3	"Run, Raven, Run"	Rich Correll	Marc Warren	November 14, 2003	202	N/A
25	4	"Clothes Minded"	Sean McNamara	Edward C. Evans	January 1, 2004	207	N/A
26	5	"Four's a Crowd"	Rich Correll	Michael Feldman	January 30, 2004	206	N/A
27	6	"Hearts and Minds"	Rich Correll	Michael Feldman	February 6, 2004	212	N/A
28	7	"Close Encounters of the Nerd Kind"	John Tracy	Josh Lynn & Danny Warren	March 19, 2004	211	2.4
29	8	"That's So Not Raven"	Sean McNamara	Dennis Rinsler	April 9, 2004	201	N/A
30	9	"Blue in the Face"	Sean McNamara	Maisha Closson	April 16, 2004	208	N/A
31	10	"Spa Day Afternoon"	Carl Lauten	Dava Savel	May 21, 2004	209	N/A
32	11	"Leave It to Diva"	Donna Pescow	Marc Warren	May 28, 2004	213	N/A
33	12	"There Goes the Bride"	Erma Elzy-Jones	Sarah Jane Cunningham & Suzie V. Freeman	June 11, 2004	216	N/A
34	13	"Radio Heads"	Rich Correll	Dennis Rinsler	June 25, 2004	215	N/A
35	14	"A Goat's Tale"	Debbie Allen	Edward C. Evans	July 2, 2004	217	N/A
36	15	"He's Got the Power"	John Tracy	Dava Savel	July 9, 2004	205	N/A
37	16	"Skunk'd"	Christopher B. Pearman	Sarah Jane Cunningham & Suzie V. Freeman	July 16, 2004	219	N/A
38	17	"The Dating Shame"	Sean McNamara	Edward C. Evans & Michael Feldman	July 23, 2004	218	N/A
39	18	"The Road to Audition"	Debbie Allen	Beth Seriff & Geoff Tarson	July 30, 2004	214	4.3
40	19	"The Lying Game"	Rich Correll	Dennis Rinsler & Marc Warren	August 6, 2004	220	4.3
41	20	"Numb and Numb-er"	Rondell Sheridan	Michael Feldman & Dava Savel	September 10, 2004	221	N/A
42	21	"My Big Fat Pizza Party"	John Tracy	Michael Carrington	September 17, 2004	210	N/A
43	22	"Shake, Rattle, and Rae"	Marc Warren	Story by : Lanny Horn; Teleplay by : Sarah Watson & Jason M. Palmer	September 24, 2004	222	N/A

=== Season 3 (2004–06) ===
That's So Raven Season 3 episodes
No. overall	No. in season	Title	Directed by	Written by	Original release date	Prod. code	U.S. viewers (millions)
44	1	"Psychic Eye for the Sloppy Guy"	Rich Correll	Marc Warren	October 1, 2004	301	N/A
45	2	"Stark Raven Mad"	Marc Warren	Sarah Jane Cunningham & Suzie V. Freeman	October 22, 2004	304	N/A
46	3	"Opportunity Shocks"	Rich Correll	Dava Savel	November 5, 2004	309	N/A
47	4	"Taken to the Cleaners"	Rich Correll	Michael Feldman	November 19, 2004	313	N/A
48	5	"Five Finger Discount"	Rich Correll	Dennis Rinsler	December 3, 2004	302	N/A
49	6	"Sweeps"	Sean McNamara	Dennis Rinsler	December 11, 2004	311	N/A
50	7	"Double Vision"	T'Keyah Crystal Keymáh	Sarah Jane Cunningham & Suzie V. Freeman	December 17, 2004	318	N/A
51	8	"Bend It Like Baxter"	Rich Correll	Dava Savel	January 7, 2005	315	N/A
52	9	"The Big Buzz"	Eric Dean Seaton	Marc Warren	January 28, 2005	322	N/A
53	10	"True Colors"	Christopher B. Pearman	Michael Carrington	February 4, 2005	303	N/A
54	11	"Dog Day Aftergroom"	Casey Lynn De Stefano	Theresa Akana & Stacee Comage	February 11, 2005	317	N/A
55	12	"The Royal Treatment"	Christopher B. Pearman	Sarah Jane Cunningham & Suzie V. Freeman	February 18, 2005	310	N/A
56	13	"Art Breaker"	Gregory Hobson	Josh Lynn & Danny Warren	February 25, 2005	308	N/A
57	14	"Boyz in Commotion"	Debbie Allen	Theresa Akana & Stacee Comage	March 11, 2005 (Note: This episode was first released on Supernaturally Stylish VHS/DVD on December 7, 2004.)	306	N/A
58	15	"Gettin' Out of Dodge"	Rich Correll	Edward C. Evans	April 8, 2005	319	N/A
59	16	"On Top of Old Oaky"	John Tracy	Michael Feldman	April 22, 2005	305	N/A
60	17	"They Work Hard for His Honey"	Eric Dean Seaton	Edward C. Evans	April 29, 2005	307	4.2
61	18	"Mind Your Own Business"	Eric Dean Seaton	Dennis Rinsler	May 13, 2005	327	N/A
62	19	"Hizzouse Party"	Rich Correll	Michael Carrington	June 6, 2005	312	5.1
63	20	"Mismatch Maker"	Fred Savage	Edward C. Evans	June 7, 2005	325	4.3
64	21	"Chef-Man and Raven"	Rich Correll	Story by : Jim Reynolds; Teleplay by : Lanny Horn & Sarah Watson	June 8, 2005	314	5.0
65	22	"When in Dome"	Marc Warren	Sarah Jane Cunningham & Suzie V. Freeman	June 9, 2005	328	4.7
66	23	"Too Much Pressure"	Rich Correll	Dava Savel	June 10, 2005	323	4.4
67	24	"The Grill Next Door"	Sean McNamara	Michael Feldman	July 8, 2005	324	N/A
68	25	"Extreme Cory"	Rich Correll	Theresa Akana & Stacee Comage	July 8, 2005	326	N/A
69	26	"Point of No Return"	Sean McNamara	Edward C. Evans	July 23, 2005	330	N/A
70	27	"Country Cousins: Parts 1 & 2"	Sean McNamara	Dennis Rinsler (Part 1)	July 29, 2005	320	4.2
71	28	"Country Cousins: Parts 1 & 2"	Sean McNamara	Michael Carrington (Part 2)	July 29, 2005	321	4.2
72	29	"Food for Thought"	Rich Correll	Marc Warren	September 18, 2005	316	N/A
73	30	"Mr. Perfect"	Rich Correll	Michael Carrington	October 7, 2005	329	N/A
74	31	"Goin' Hollywood"	Rich Correll	Dennis Rinsler & Marc Warren	November 4, 2005	333	3.7
75	32	"Save the Last Dance"	Sean McNamara	Marc Warren	November 25, 2005	334	N/A
76	33	"Cake Fear"	Rondell Sheridan	Theresa Akana & Stacee Comage	December 16, 2005	332	N/A
77	34	"Vision Impossible"	Marc Warren	David Brookwell & Sean McNamara	January 6, 2006 (Note: This episode was first released in Raven's House Party VHS/DVD on December 6, 2005.)	335	N/A
78	35	"The Four Aces"	Debbie Allen	Michael Feldman	January 16, 2006	331	N/A

=== Season 4 (2006–07) ===
No. overall	No. in season	Title	Directed by	Written by	Original release date	Prod. code	U.S. viewers (millions)
79	1	"Raven, Sydney and the Man"	Rich Correll	Marc Warren	February 20, 2006	403	4.5
80	2	"Pin Pals"	Rich Correll	Dennis Rinsler	February 24, 2006	401	N/A
81	3	"Dues and Don'ts"	Rich Correll	Theresa Akana & Stacee Comage	March 3, 2006	404	N/A
82	4	"Unhappy Medium"	Rich Correll	Josh Lynn & Danny Warren	March 17, 2006	407	N/A
83	5	"Adventures in Boss-Sitting"	Eric Dean Seaton	Jessica Lopez	March 24, 2006	406	N/A
84	6	"Hook Up My Space"	Rich Correll	Michael Feldman	March 31, 2006	408	3.1
85	7	"Driving Miss Lazy"	Eric Dean Seaton	Michael Carrington	April 21, 2006	405	N/A
86	8	"Be Prepared"	Debbie Allen	Marc Warren	May 12, 2006	413	N/A
87	9	"Juicer Consequences"	Rich Correll	Michael Feldman	June 24, 2006	402	N/A
88	10	"Sister Act"	Marc Warren	Michael Feldman	July 8, 2006	412	3.5
89	11	"Checkin' Out" (Note: Part 1 of "That's So Suite Life of Hannah Montana")	Rich Correll	Story by : Michael Carrington; Teleplay by : Edward C. Evans & Al Sonja L. Rice	July 28, 2006	422	5.7
90	12	"Fur Better or Worse"	Eric Dean Seaton	Deborah Swisher	August 4, 2006	410	N/A
91	13	"Mad Hot Cotillion"	Rich Correll	Michael Carrington	August 11, 2006	415	N/A
92	14	"When 6021 Met 4267"	Eric Dean Seaton	Dennis Rinsler	August 18, 2006 (Note: This episode was first released in Raven's Makeover Madness DVD on July 18, 2006.)	411	3.5
93	15	"Soup to Nuts"	Rich Correll	Story by : Michael Feldman; Teleplay by : Dennis Rinsler & Marc Warren	August 25, 2006	421	4.3
94	16	"Members Only"	Rich Correll	Theresa Akana & Stacee Comage	September 15, 2006	414	N/A
95	17	"The Ice Girl Cometh"	Rich Correll	Al Sonja L. Rice	September 22, 2006	409	N/A
96	18	"Rae of Sunshine"	Eric Dean Seaton	Lanny Horn	October 6, 2006	418	N/A
97	19	"The Dress is Always Greener"	Eric Dean Seaton	Deborah Swisher	November 25, 2006	416	N/A
98	20	"Teacher's Pet"	Rondell Sheridan	Al Sonja L. Rice	January 15, 2007	417	3.9
99	21	"The Way We Were"	Eric Dean Seaton	Story by : Deborah Swisher; Teleplay by : Theresa Akana & Stacee Comage	March 2, 2007	420	3.5
100	22	"Where There's Smoke"	Eric Dean Seaton	Edward C. Evans	November 10, 2007	419	5.5

== See also ==
- List of The Suite Life of Zack & Cody episodes - includes "That's So Suite Life of Hannah Montana", part two of crossover with the same name
- List of Hannah Montana episodes - includes "On the Road Again", part three of "That's So Suite Life of Hannah Montana" crossover
- List of Cory in the House episodes - includes crossover episode "That's So in the House"
- List of Raven's Home episodes
