= List of Cory in the House episodes =

Episode List

Cory in the House is a spin-off of the Disney Channel Original Series, That's So Raven. It aired on Disney Channel from January 12, 2007, to September 12, 2008. A total of 34 episodes were produced, spanning 2 seasons. The show was about a teenager named Cory Baxter who moves from San Francisco to Washington, D.C., with his father Victor Baxter, who gets a job as head chef in the White House.

== Series overview ==
Season	Episodes	Originally released	
Season	Episodes	First released	Last released
1	21	January 12, 2007	September 21, 2007
2	13	November 17, 2007	September 12, 2008

== Episodes ==
=== Season 1 (2007) ===
No. overall	No. in season	Title	Directed by	Written by	Original release date	Prod. code	Viewers (millions)
1	1	"New Kid in Town"	Rich Correll	Dennis Rinsler & Marc Warren	January 12, 2007	101	7.6
With Tanya still in England and Raven in college, Victor Baxter accepts a job as the chef of the President. Cory and Victor arrive in Washington, D.C. and meet Meena Paroom, Newt Livingston, Sophie Martinez, President Martinez, and Samantha, the President's assistant. Cory goes to his new school and tells Meena, Newt, and Jason Stickler that he steeplechases. But the truth comes out when Cory has to ride at the Presidential banquet honoring a horse. Cory is trying to get to know people
2	2	"Ain't Miss Bahavian"	Rich Correll	Marc Warren	January 19, 2007	102	3.7
Bahavian ambassador Raum Paroom, Meena's father, discovers his daughter isn't following traditional Bahavian ways by changing out of Bahavian costumes and playing music with Newt and Cory, and forbids her from speaking to Cory and Newt. Meanwhile, Victor and Samantha try to get Sophie to eliminate her addiction to Victor's fries.
3	3	"Everybody Loves Meena"	Rich Correll	Michael Carrington	January 26, 2007	104	3.6
Cory finds the initials 'C.B.' with a heart around them in Meena's notebook, and assumes she has a crush on him, when it's really on Craig Berkowitz. Meena asks for Cory's advice on how to get to Craig to ask her out, so they pretend to be a couple. However, Stickler believes they really are a couple and decides to ruin their fake date. Meanwhile, Sophie develops a crush on Newt and invites him over for a tea party. Title Reference: Everybody Loves Raymond Absent: John D'Aquino as President Richard Martinez
4	4	"We Built This Kitty on Rock and Roll"	David Kendall	Theresa Akana & Stacee Comage	February 2, 2007	108	3.6
Cory tries to get his band to perform on the president's Reading benefit show, but Samantha stops them until they trick Sophie into joining the band. Sophie forces the band to play her song about cats, while Samantha tries to stop the president from making bird calls on television.
5	5	"Rock the Vote"	Rich Correll	Edward C. Evans	February 9, 2007	107	3.3
Newt is forced to run for class president by his parents despite not wanting to. When Cory tries to help, it only makes matters worse making Newt more popular than he already is. He then tries to run against Newt in an attempt to steal the popular vote by fighting a bear in a cage which only makes the student body chant against him. Once Newt gets them to cheer for Cory exclaiming what a great guy he is, he finally accepts that he has a gift for leadership and decides to become president. Meanwhile, the President realises careers day is a lot tougher than it looks.
6	6	"Napper's Delight"	Eric Dean Seaton	Michael Feldman	February 16, 2007	105	3.6
Cory wants to go with Meena and Newt on a ski trip to South America, but Stickler destroys his ATM card. To earn the money, Cory gives secret tours of the White House, letting people see Sophie, but when Sophie finds out she won't be going skiing, she steals the money and runs off. Meanwhile, Victor is being kept up at night by the President, who has Jet lag.
7	7	"Smells Like School Spirit"	Eric Dean Seaton	Josh Silverstein	February 23, 2007	109	N/A
Newt's first act as student president is to institute a "Chill Zone" where students can hang out. Candy Smiles makes a Pep Squad, which Cory joins to impress Meena. Trying to make Meena jealous, Cory accepts Candy's offer to go out on a date. Absent: Madison Pettis as Sophie Martinez, John D'Aquino as President Richard Martinez
8	8	"Just Desserts"	Eric Dean Seaton	Dennis Rinsler	March 2, 2007	113	4.2
When Meena makes a tasty Bahavian pastry, Nakishkas, Cory convinces Samantha to use them as dessert for an important White House dinner at the banquet, but things end up in disaster when a mix-up in the recipe causes them to explode. Meanwhile, Sophie is teased at school since she still has training wheels on her bike, so chef Victor teaches her.
9	9	"Bahavian Idol"	Rich Correll	Marc Warren	March 9, 2007	111	3.1
Cory, Newt and Meena are finally going to perform in front of Meena's father, the ambassador. However, Meena is extremely nervous. Cory gives her a good luck charm, but she thinks it's "cursed". Absent: Madison Pettis as Sophie Martinez, John D'Aquino as President Richard Martinez
10	10	"Beat the Press"	Eric Dean Seaton	Dennis Rinsler	March 23, 2007	103	N/A
After giving the President advice on how to deal with a stuffed nose, Cory is tricked into telling a reporter that he tells the President what to do. Meanwhile, Newt is upset that Meena and Cory never use his ideas for the band. Absent: Madison Pettis as Sophie Martinez
11	11	"Mall of Confusion"	Rich Correll	Josh Lynn & Danny Warren	April 13, 2007	112	N/A
Wearing a disguise, the President goes to the mall to buy perfume for the First Lady for their wedding anniversary, bringing Cory along (Cory wanted to go just to get a video game), then things go bad: Jason Stickler arrives with a "Memory Loss Spray", then the President and Newt accidentally spray it on themselves. Soon, a man named Burt, who looks almost exactly like the President's disguise, then Cory mistakes Burt for the President, and Burt's boss mistakes the President for Burt. Meanwhile, Meena must deal with Sophie when she becomes a self-proclaimed "expert" on all things Bahavian.
12	12	"Get Smarter"	Rondell Sheridan	Sarah Jane Cunningham & Suzie V. Freeman	May 11, 2007	110	N/A
An intelligent new student arrives, and Newt develops a crush on her. They go out on a date, and Newt asks Cory, Meena and Jason to help him to impress her by using Jason's spy gear. Absent: Madison Pettis as Sophie Martinez
13	13	"And the Weenie Is..."	Roger Christiansen	Michael Feldman	May 18, 2007	115	N/A
The band has their first live gig at school, but Cory's nemesis, the Juicer (from That's So Raven), arrives. Cory decides to do whatever the Juicer asks, to avoid being made to look like a weenie, which makes the Juicer think the band is performing at his birthday party. Back at the White House, Victor makes homemade ice cream by cranking a lever. He works on it all day thus gaining a bicep in the end. Absent: Madison Pettis as Sophie Martinez, John D'Aquino as President Richard Martinez
14	14	"No, No, Nanoosh"	Rich Correll	Al Sonja L. Schmidt	June 16, 2007	116	N/A
When Meena's favorite singer Nanoosh from Bahavia comes to Washington, D.C., she enters a contest to meet him and ends up winning. However, Nanoosh later reveals that she only won because Nanoosh fixed the contest because Meena's father is the Ambassador of Bahavia, and used her to help his career. Meanwhile, Victor has hired Becky (from the Mall episode) to help in the kitchen for a dinner for visiting world leaders, but she takes advantage of it. Absent: Madison Pettis as Sophie Martinez, John D'Aquino as President Richard Martinez
15	15	"Airforce One Too Many"	Eric Dean Seaton	Al Sonja L. Schmidt	June 30, 2007	106	N/A
Cory is in deep trouble when he accidentally gives the deed to Alaska to the Russian Ambassador, and when the Ambassador doesn't want to give it back, Cory has to sneak onto Air Force One to get it back, even offering the ambassador Air Force One but is turned down. The Ambassador agrees to return Alaska, but only if Cory can beat him in a dance videogame, but what Cory doesn't know is, the Ambassador is a pro, and if he loses Russia will get both Alaska and Air Force One. Absent: Jason Dolley as Newt Livingston, Maiara Walsh as Meena Paroom
16	16	"That's So in the House"	Rich Correll	Michael Carrington	July 8, 2007	114	4.2
While visiting, Raven has a vision of the president being crushed by a grandfather clock, she tries to prevent it from coming true by tackling him out of the way of the clock, but when the clock doesn't fall, she becomes a wanted criminal. And Cory is forced to impersonate her while everyone in the White House is trying to find her. Special Guest Star: Raven-Symoné as Raven Baxter Absent: Madison Pettis as Sophie Martinez
17	17	"Gone Wishin'"	Carl Lauten	Theresa Akana & Stacee Comage	July 13, 2007	119	4.5
Cory wishes on a shooting star that he was president of the United States. His wish goes amiss when he ignores his vice-president, Sophie, on a warning threatening national security. Note: Aired on Disney Channel's "Wish Gone Amiss Weekend" which was viewed on average by 5.1 million viewers.
18	18	"I Ain't Got Rhythm"	Rich Correll	Beth Seriff & Geoff Tarson	July 29, 2007	118	4.6
Cory invites a top music manager to hear DC3 play but thinks that they need a keyboard player. Jason Stickler is the best choice for the band, but he tries to take over the band after using a C.I.A. rhythm destabilizer on Cory that messes with his ability to play the drums. Meanwhile Sophie has a sleepover that Samantha is in charge of planning and supervising. It's also Samatha's first sleepover.
19	19	"The Kung Fu Kats Kid"	Rondell Sheridan	Edward C. Evans	August 4, 2007	117	N/A
After ditching Sophie to watch Kung Fu Kats and accidentally leaving his webcam on, Sophie blackmails Cory so Cory, Newt and Meena are forced to let her hang out with the big kids or else she will send it to everyone. Absent: John D'Aquino as President Richard Martinez
20	20	"A Rat By Any Other Name"	Marc Warren	Josh Lynn & Danny Warren	August 11, 2007	121	N/A
Cory's pet rat, Lionel, returns, but his friends don't like Lionel as much as Cory does, so Cory gives Lionel to Sophie. His friends then tell him they actually do like Lionel, so Cory tries to get him back, after that Sophie realized that Lionel loved Cory, she gave Lionel back to Cory in the end. After being accused of having no sense of humor, the President tries to be funny.
21	21	"Never the Dwayne Shall Meet"	Rondell Sheridan	Lanny Horn	September 21, 2007 (Note: This episode was first released in Cory in the House: All Star Edition DVD on August 7, 2007.)	120	4.1
Dwayne Johnson is in town, and Cory tries to get him to endorse an exercise machine. Sophie tries to get people to come to her tea party, but everyone wants to meet The Rock instead. Cory, Samantha, President, Meena, Newt and Victor don't get to meet the Rock because of being stuck inside a janitor closet but Sophie does. Note: This episode aired a week before the release of The Game Plan, which stars Dwayne "The Rock" Johnson and Madison Pettis.

=== Season 2 (2007–08) ===
No. overall	No. in season	Title	Directed by	Written by	Original release date	Prod. code
22	1	"The Presidential Seal"	Eric Dean Seaton	Al Sonja L. Schmidt	November 17, 2007	201
Cory and Newt decide to try to get girlfriends. Cory tries to impress a girl named Nicole (Tanya Chisholm), but she only dates people who love history like herself. He then mentions that he lives in the White House and gets Nicole to come into the Oval Office with him. While kissing Nicole, Cory accidentally spills the ink all over the Presidential Seal. Now he must try to somehow restore it. Meanwhile, Victor is put under pressure when he has to cook a $50,000 fish, and when Newt brings a seal (the animal) to the White House, things only get crazier.
23	2	"Through the Roof"	Rondell Sheridan	Marc Warren	December 1, 2007	202
Alexander asks DC3 to make a new song before sundown, and Newt and Cory can't think of one without the aid of Meena, who is training Sophie's Sunshine Girls, and soon get into a fight. They both fly through the ceiling (or floor as Newt puts it), and soon realize that they were fighting for nothing. Absent: John D'Aquino as President Richard Martinez
24	3	"Monster's Ball"	Eric Dean Seaton	Dennis Rinsler	December 8, 2007	203
Meena learns that her birthday will be on a popular television show,"My Party Is Better Than Yours!" but it changes her feelings for Cory and Newt, which causes them to not be friends. Meanwhile the President, Victor and Samantha can't tell Sophie how bad her cooking is. When Meena watches the video, she is horrified. Later, when the episode is about to be broadcast, the President and Sophie teach the world how to make cheese sandwiches for 30 minutes.
25	4	"Lip Service"	Marc Warren	Michael Carrington	January 19, 2008	204
Cory is perplexed as to why Newt won't kiss any girls until he and Meena learn that he pinky-swore to share his first kiss with his childhood girlfriend from camp. We see Newt ultimately get his first kiss. Meanwhile Victor gets frustrated when he can't beat Sophie at any games.
26	5	"Who Let the Dolls Out"	Eric Dean Seaton	Michael Feldman	February 16, 2008	205
After Cory makes a Sophie doll that acts like a brat, Sophie gets even with Cory by making him think the doll is haunted. Meena and Candy Smiles see Newt with what they think is a leprechaun, but find out he is an Irish shoe salesman who taught Newt how to do Irish step dancing. Absent: John D'Aquino as President Richard Martinez
27	6	"We Don't Have Chemistry"	Mark Cendrowski	Beth Seriff & Geoff Tarson	March 15, 2008	208
Cory officially makes a date with Candy, but it is on the same night that Stickler is supposed to tutor Cory in Chemistry, a class that he must pass in order to avoid summer school. Sophie runs for class president against Tanisha. Absent: Jason Dolley as Newt Livingston
28	7	"Uninvited Pest"	Eric Dean Seaton	Danny Warren	April 19, 2008	210
Cory learns he is a finalist for Young Businessmen of the Year but his chance is slim when Stanley, from That's So Raven, returns and tries to steal his presentation. This is part of Disney Channel's April 2008 Night of Premieres. Absent: Jason Dolley as Newt Livingston, Madison Pettis as Sophie Martinez
29	8	"Making the Braid"	Carl Lauten	Edward C. Evans	May 31, 2008	206
Cory discovers Newt's talent for braiding hair, and opens up a braiding shop with his great-aunt's inheritance in his freezer that he wasn't allowed to touch. As a result, it almost drives Newt's competitor out of business and calls for a braid-off between the two. Meanwhile, Sophie and her friend Tanisha get grounded for going to Haley's birthday party and dressing inappropriately.
30	9	"Model Behavior"	David Kendall	Stacee Comage	June 14, 2008	207
When Stickler needs a friend (because his robot is broken), he tells Newt and Cory that he knows some supermodels. Then Cory and Newt are invited to make an advertisement in Hawaii. But since they have no experience, they do an intensive training to be male models. After all "hard work," they learn that they were only invited to this because they were clumsy, and now they're "fabulous." So Stickler gets the job, it turns out that this was made to advertise 'Stank Away', which everyone in school makes fun of. Sophie is embarrassed because her father does not know how to "dance," so Victor teaches him how to "dance." Note: The title for the advertisement is called 'Stank Away'. In the That's So Raven episode "Mind Your Own Business", Raven, Chelsea and Eddie's project is called 'Stank Away'. Absent: Maiara Walsh as Meena Paroom
31	10	"Sittin' Pretty"	Rondell Sheridan	Lanny Horn	July 5, 2008	213
Cory and Candy babysit Sophie and Tanisha. Sophie makes a prank-call saying it's a girl named Kimberly, which causes them to break up. Cory and Newt try to find out who sent the prank call by using one of Stickler's devices.
32	11	"Macho Libre"	Mark Cendrowski	Jessica Lopez	July 12, 2008	214
Cory takes up lucha libre, a type of wrestling popular in Mexico, to impress Candy when she starts spending time with a new Mexican student; Sophie, Tanisha and Haley form a singing group called the Pink Cupcakes for a school talent show, but their egos get in the way.
33	12	"Peace, Love & Misunderstanding"	Mark Cendrowski	Sarah Jane Cunningham & Suzie V. Freeman	August 30, 2008 (Note: This episode was first released in Newt and Improved Edition DVD on May 27, 2008.)	209
Sophie tries to pull practical jokes, but isn't very good at it. Meanwhile, a female that Cory's interested in turns out to be the daughter of another ambassador from a country, Dubinia, that's a sworn enemy of Bahavia. Meena threatens Cory that if he is friends with the girl from Dubinia, she won't be friends with him. Cory and the president try to make peace between them. Sophie's indecent jokes end up making the peace between the two countries. Absent: Jason Dolley as Newt Livingston
34	13	"Mad Songs Pay So Much"	Rich Correll	Marc Warren	September 12, 2008	215
After breaking up with Craig, Meena writes an angry song and DC3 gets a chance for their song to be in a movie, Meena then gets back together with Craig which makes Cory and Newt happy, but Meena can't get angry enough to finish writing the song so they trick Craig and Meena but it turns out Meena knew all along so they tricked Cory and Newt. Sophie, Tanisha and Haley stay up late to watching a movie instead of doing their book report.

== See also ==
- List of That's So Raven episodes
- List of Hannah Montana episodes - includes crossover episode "Take This Job and Love It"
