= List of Nicky, Ricky, Dicky & Dawn episodes =

Nicky, Ricky, Dicky & Dawn is an American comedy television series developed by Michael Feldman and created by Matt Fleckenstein that aired on Nickelodeon from September 13, 2014, to August 4, 2018. The series stars Brian Stepanek, Allison Munn, Aidan Gallagher, Casey Simpson, Mace Coronel, Lizzy Greene, Gabrielle Elyse, and Kyla-Drew Simmons.

== Series overview ==
Season	Episodes	Originally released	
Season	Episodes	First released	Last released
1	20	September 13, 2014	March 24, 2015
2	25	May 23, 2015	August 6, 2016
3	23	January 7, 2017	August 5, 2017
4	14	January 6, 2018	August 4, 2018

== Episodes ==
=== Season 1 (2014–15) ===
No. overall	No. in season	Title	Directed by	Written by	Original release date	Prod. code	U.S. viewers (millions)
1	1	"Pilot"	Victor Gonzalez	Teleplay by : Matt Fleckenstein & Michael Feldman; Story by : Matt Fleckenstein	September 13, 2014	101	1.60
After getting into another argument with each other at school, the Harper quads adopt a dog, which their mother says they can only keep if they can work together to take care of him. Unable to work together, the quads get into a fight over the dog's name, which causes the dog to urinate on a signed sports jersey belonging to the quads' father Tom. The four then work together to try to hide and repair the damage from their parents, but their scheme is uncovered; however, their mother Anne allows them to keep the dog since she is proud that they were finally able to work together. Guest star: Shaun Brown as Kenny Absent: Gabrielle Elyse as Josie
2	2	"Dawn Moves Out"	Jonathan Judge	Sarah Jane Cunningham & Suzie V. Freeman	September 20, 2014	104	1.53
After the boys ruin yet another one of Dawn's sleepovers, Anne decides it is time for Dawn to get her own room. Dawn gloats about it to her brothers, who are jealous, since they still have to share a room, and they get into a fight about who can last longer without each other. During Dawn's first night in her own room, she begins noticing frightening things, having never slept in a room without her brothers before; however, she is too stubborn to admit that she misses her brothers and begins to lose sleep. Meanwhile, her brothers have realized that they need Dawn to keep themselves from fighting with one another, but they, like Dawn, refuse to admit defeat. Later, the quads meet up in the air conditioning vent and apologize; however, as soon as they have made up, the air vent breaks from being unable to support their weight, and they come crashing down through the ceiling. Guest star: Kyla-Drew Simmons as Mae Absent: Gabrielle Elyse as Josie
3	3	"Get Sporty-er!"	Jonathan Judge	Douglas Danger Lieblein	September 27, 2014	103	1.54
The quads meet a new girl named Tess, who Nicky, Ricky and Dicky are falling in love with and think she is perfect, except Dawn, who thinks she is a bad girl trying to impress her brothers. Later, Tom and Anne see the Dynamites, a couple that destroyed their chances at winning at the dance competition and humiliated them, who have now opened the same sporting store as Tom and Anne. The next day, Tess hears from the quads about the same store opening and shoots a commercial and later replaces it for the new sporting store Rod's Get Sporty-er! Dawn finds out that the same tennis balls in the new store explode. Later, the Harpers get revenge on the Dynamites. Guest stars: Aubrey Miller as Tess, Mircea Monroe as Tiffany, Andrew Bowen as Rod
4	4	"Field of Brains"	Eric Dean Seaton	Natalie Barbrie & Tim Brenner	October 4, 2014	107	1.79
After being called too young by Josie and her friend, the quads try to prove them wrong by watching a zombie movie called Field of Brains; however, Tom and Anne tell the quads that the movie is too scary for them, but they ignore them. After watching the movie, they become very frightened and begin seeing symptoms that Tom and Anne are becoming zombies. Later, they brew up a cure and put it in Tom and Anne's shoes. Later, they learn that there are rational explanations for all the things they saw and later impress Josie and her friend by talking about the movie. Guest star: David Hoffman as Grizz Coyote
5	5	"Scaredy Dance"	Shannon Flynn	Michael Feldman	October 18, 2014	111	1.52
Mack asks Dawn to go with him to the Halloween dance but Dawn is scared because she doesn't know how to dance. To avoid embarrassing herself, Dawn puts on a giant costume that's impossible to dance in. Mack is upset at first but Dawn explains why she doesn't want to dance. Mack turns out to be a horrible dancer too. Meanwhile, Dicky teaches Ricky to dress and act like him in order to get girls to go to the dance with him. They end up asking the same girl to the dance, and she refuses to choose just one of them. When she eventually chooses the real Dicky, Dicky feels bad for Ricky and lets her down. Guest stars: Kyla-Drew Simmons as Mae, Lincoln Melcher as Mack, Storm Reid as Scarlett
6	6	"Remote Control Control"	Victor Gonzalez	Andrew Hill Newman	November 1, 2014	105	2.36
Due to the quads' constant fighting over control of the TV remote, Tom punishes them for the weekend. However, wishing to avoid arguing and noise in the early hours of Tom and Anne's anniversary, the punishment is lifted for Saturday morning. Meanwhile, Tom gets Anne a new bed with different features for their anniversary while Anne gives Tom a universal remote control he dubs "Clicky". After Ricky secretly hides the TV remote from the others, Dawn and Dicky sneak Clicky out of their parents' bedroom, and chaos erupts when they press the wrong buttons on Clicky. Absent: Gabrielle Elyse as Josie
7	7	"Poo Dunnit"	Eric Dean Seaton	Douglas Danger Lieblein	November 8, 2014	110	1.66
The Harpers are all set out for a family trip to the waterpark, where Tom is anxious to win a waterslide race, and the quads are anxious to make a good face for the camera on the scary log flume ride. However, the trip is in danger of cancellation when no one is willing to accept responsibility for a recent lack of bathroom courtesy. So, the quads work together to discover who the "poop-etrator" is, and it turns out not to be who they expect. Absent: Gabrielle Elyse as Josie
8	8	"I Got Your Back"	Eric Dean Seaton	Tesha Kondrat	November 15, 2014	109	2.09
After finally making the soccer team, Dawn tries to hang out with the soccer girls but they tell her that she has to do something to win them over. While trying to impress them, Dawn trips and accidentally drops a plate of food on Nicky's head. The soccer girls love it and ask her to do it again the next day for them to record. As Dawn tries to embarrass Nicky again, Ricky notices her and pours food on her head instead. Nicky then does the same to Ricky for not having Dicky's back because, earlier on, Ricky had let Dicky take the fall for a prank he did. In the chaos, all the quads endup with food plates on their heads. They all get detention for food fight. Guest stars: Ian Reed Kesler as Mr. Williams, Jada Facer as Ang Absent: Gabrielle Elyse as Josie
9	9	"The Sad Tail of Gary-Chip-Tiny Elvis-Squishy Paws"	Eric Dean Seaton	Paul Ciancarelli & David DiPietro	November 22, 2014	108	1.90
The quads argue over the name of the dog they adopted in the pilot episode after he stops a criminal at Get Sporty. After that, the press dubs them "the Horrible Harpers". Finally, a wealthy woman claims the Harpers' dog as her own and the quads try to get the dog back. Inside the woman's house, they find a room filled with dog memorabilia and jump to the conclusion that she is "a real-life Cruella de Vil". In the end, the quads think of a fair way to decide on the dog's name, and the dog ends up being named Squishy Paws, much to Dawn's delight as that was her name idea. Guest stars: Sheryl Lee Ralph as Ms. Eleanor Dumont, Danielle Morrow as Veronica Miller
10	10	"Santa's Little Harpers"	Shannon Flynn	Tim Brenner & Natalie Barbrie	November 29, 2014	113	2.24
As Christmas break starts, the quads sneak into the attic to snoop at their presents to know what their parents got them. Unfortunately, they are busted by Anne and Tom and are punished to work as elves at Tom’s Get Sporty for the entire Christmas break. After discovering that Dicky has been getting better tips, the quads start fighting over it and competing to see which one makes the most money. When a child gets lost while they’re fighting, the quads team up to get him back. Afterward, they agree to give their tips money to Josie to buy a new guitar and spread Christmas spirit.
11	11	"The Quadfather"	Victor Gonzalez	David DiPietro & Paul Ciancarelli	January 10, 2015	102	1.55
The Harpers have a birthday tradition where Tom dresses up as “the Quadfather” and grants the quads one wish each. Ricky, Dicky and Dawn have already figured out that Tom is the Quadfather but Nicky still believes the Quadfather is real. Nicky discovers the truth when he hears the Quadfather sneeze like Tom. He gets upset and doesn’t want the birthday tradition anymore. The quads can’t agree on a new birthday theme. So, each one throws their own party with a different theme. However, all their parties end up boring, and their guests ask for the Quadfather. Tom saves the day by dressing up as the Quadfather and uniting the parties. Guest star: Kyla-Drew Simmons as Mae
12	12	"The Quad-Test"	Eric Dean Seaton	Michael Feldman & Matt Fleckenstein	January 24, 2015	115	1.72
The quads make a bet to give up their favorite childhood possessions; the one who gives in first has to do the others' chores for a month. Meanwhile, Tom and Anne find a bunch of their junk in the attic and also participate in the quads' challenge. Tom wears a motorcycle outfit so tight he can barely move and carries his accordion around with him everywhere, while Anne crimps her hair and makes unintentionally burned waffles every day. Later, the quads, realizing they are still attached to their security items, call off the bet, while Tom and Anne get tired of overusing their old things, having made themselves miserable. Guest stars: Alex Morgan as herself, Bob Pflugfelder as Science Bob (himself)
13	13	"The Secret"	Robbie Countryman	David L. Moses & Steven James Meyer	January 31, 2015	116	1.50
Dawn feels betrayed after discovering that her parents have been replacing her goldfish, and her brothers knew about it. She calls for a "quadfession session" to restore trust among the quads. During the confession circle, each one of the quads reveals their darkest secret to the rest. Dawn’s secret is that she likes Mack. The next day at school, Dawn and Mack are surprised to hear other students singing “Dawn likes Mack!” She concludes that it was her brothers who revealed her secret but they deny it. She gets revenge on them by blasting their secrets to the entire school. Later on, she’s shocked to learn that it was Tom’s parrot that exposed the secret by repeating “Dawn likes Mack!” She apologizes to her brothers. Guest stars: Tom Kenny as Mike the Parrot (VO), Lincoln Melcher as Mack
14	14	"Take the Money and Run"	Shannon Flynn	Sarah Jane Cunningham & Suzie V. Freeman	February 7, 2015	112	1.47
After selling a bracelet with sentimental value that Anne gave to her so that she can buy a ticket to a fan festival, Dawn goes to extreme measures to retrieve it. Meanwhile, disappointed with the boys, Tom takes away their video games and gives them activity tracker wristbands, promising to give them their video games back if they walk 10,000 steps. When Dawn finds that the boys have been "outsourcing" their steps to Squishy Paws, she makes a deal with them to help her make extra bracelets to sell so she can buy back her original bracelet. Guest stars: Kyla-Drew Simmons as Mae, McKaley Miller as Emily, Maitlyn Pezzo as Indra
15	15	"Valentime's Day"	Eric Dean Seaton	Teleplay by : Douglas Danger Lieblein; Story by : Angeline Olschewski	February 14, 2015	118	1.80
When Tom and Anne are not feeling pumped for Valentine's Day, the quads become curious about why they hate the holiday so much. After looking around the attic, the quads find a tape dated "Valentine's Day, 2004", the year they were born. The tape shows Tom and Anne looking at a sonogram, confirming the fact that Anne is pregnant with quadruplets. The quads stop the tape after Tom and Anne agree that Valentine's Day is "ruined forever". The quads feel guilty, thinking that they are the reason their parents despise Valentine's Day, and try to change their parents' feelings about the holiday. Their many attempts fail, ending with the couch catching fire and the quads running out of the house to a pizza restaurant. Tom and Anne find the quads and take them home to see the rest of the tape. It turns out that Tom and Anne have not celebrated Valentine's Day since 2004 because no gift they could give each other could ever live up to their children. Guest star: Kyla-Drew Simmons as Mae
16	16	"Piggy, Piggy, Piggy & Dawn"	Trevor Krischner	Matt Fleckenstein & Michael Feldman	February 28, 2015	117	2.09
The school talent show is coming up. Every year, the quads perform the same piggy puppet routine. This year, Dawn wants to do something more mature but her brothers insist on the pigs, so Dawn quits and teams up with Mack. The boys start threatening Mack to jeopardize his talent show with Dawn. During the talent show, the boys keep messing up because Dawn isn’t with them. After learning that the boys sabotaged Mack, Dawn joins them on stage with her own puppet to argue with them. While the quads are fighting, the set collapses, exposing them to the audience. Their parents confront them for fighting instead of listening to each other. Guest stars: Lincoln Melcher as Mack, Ian Reed Kesler as Mr. Williams, Maitlyn Pezzo as Indra
17	17	"Quad-ventures in Babysitting"	Victor Gonzalez	Matt Fleckenstein	March 7, 2015	106	1.60
The quads convince their parents to let Josie babysit them instead of their regular babysitter, Tanya. To seem cool in front of the soccer girls, Dawn lies that she and Josie are just hanging out. Later that evening, the soccer girls invite themselves over and other friends to the Harper’s house to hang with Josie. Before Josie knows it, it turns into an out-of-control party. When Anne and Tom return early, Josie takes blame for the party and is fired. To make things right, the quads throw a weird party in Tanya’s name and invite Josie to stop the party and be the hero. Josie figures out that they’re up to something and texts their parents. Dawn admits that it was her fault that she got Josie fired while trying to impress the soccer girls. Guest stars: Lauri Johnson as Tanya, Chiara Aurelia as Denise
18	18	"M.D. Day"	Jonathan Judge	Steven James Meyer & David L. Moses	March 14, 2015	119	1.78
The Harper quads return from their annual checkup exhausted and covered in trash. They tell Josie that it’s all a result of what they went through trying not to get banned from yet another doctor. In a flashback Dawn helps her brothers with their fears to make sure they don’t mess up like they always do. Ricky always freaks out after reading pamphlets on disease symptoms. This year, he becomes convinced that he’s pregnant. Nicky attempts to avoid germs only leads to more germ scare. Dicky has shy bladder, but this year, Dawn gets him to pee in a bottle before leaving. However, the bottle drops and Dawn has to sing for him to pee. Dawn faints because she’s afraid of the needle. Despite all the struggle, the quads make it through the checkup without being banned. Guest stars: Mark Adair-Rios as Dr. Miller, Mary Passeri as Andrea
19	19	"Abraquadabra"	Eric Dean Seaton	Teleplay by : Sarah Jane Cunningham & Suzie V. Freeman; Story by : David DiPietro & Paul Ciancarelli	March 21, 2015	120	1.43
When Ricky gets grounded for using smoke pellets in the house by Tom and Anne and is forbidden to go to his friend's party to see his idol's magic show, his siblings try to sneak him out to see his idol perform without Tom and Anne knowing. Later, at the party, Ricky volunteers for his idol's magic trick, but ends up magically disappearing, and his siblings have to try to find him. Meanwhile, Tom breaks Anne's vase while competing with her in the living room, and the two get into an argument. Guest star: Marcelo Tubert as The Wondrous Androoni
20	20	"Family Matters"	Sean Mulcahy	Andrew Hill Newman	March 24, 2015	114	1.75
When the quads are forced to cancel their Saturday evening plans for a family game night, they decide to set up their parents with another couple to get them off their back. They trick Anne and Tom into becoming friends with Mr. and Mrs. Milbanks. However, it backfires when the Milbanks reveal that they have children too and want to do a joint family game night with Harpers, including the quads. During the game night, the Milbanks turn out to be too competitive and violent for the Harpers to handle. The Harpers hide in the attic and call the Milbanks, asking them to leave but the Milbanks refuse. So, the Harpers sneak out through the window but are busted by police who don’t believe they’re actually running out of their own house. Guest stars: Kurt Long as Phil Milbank, Janelle Marra as Bonnie Milbank

=== Season 2 (2015–16) ===
No. overall	No. in season	Title	Directed by	Written by	Original release date	Prod. code	U.S. viewers (millions)
21	1	"Wanted: The Sugar Beet Gang"	Eric Dean Seaton	David DiPietro & Paul Ciancarelli	May 23, 2015	201	1.11
The Harper quads are arguing about their history project. While looking for ideas, they get accidentally locked inside a room in Get Sporty where they find a story about "The Sugar Beet Gang" in an old newspaper. The Sugar Beet Gang turns out to be their ancestors who were also quads like them. They had stolen money from the bank and hid it somewhere in Get Sporty. The Harper Quads turn it into a treasure hunt to look for the treasure, before realizing that the gang's enemies had stolen the treasure while they were arguing. The quads agree to stop arguing all the time and learn from history to avoid repeating it. Guest stars: John Farley as Mr. Dexter, Kyla-Drew Simmons as Mae
22	2	"No Ifs, ands, or But-ers"	Trevor Kirschner	Sarah Jane Cunningham & Suzie V. Freeman	May 30, 2015	203	1.51
When Anne gets accepted to join the book club, she kicks out the quads to hangout in the garage so that they don't mess things up. While the Harper quads are hanging at Tom's Get Sporty when Madison arrives. They call her "the but-er" because she's always one-upping them to prove that she's better than everyone. After gloating about her fashion and being smarter than Ricky, Madison makes fun of the quads for living in a garage. The Harpers get offended and try to prove that the garage is cool by making up lies about it. So, Madison agrees to come check it out. The quads invite their friends to the garage for breakfast and entertainment. Madison checks it out and is impressed. The following weekend, Madison one-ups them by throwing a bigger garage party inviting everyone to go to her place. The next day, the quads get their friends back by installing their dad's mechanical "Terry" bull. Unfortunately, the electricity malfunctions causing the mechanical bull to crash into Anne's book club, making Anne furious. Madison tries to make fun of them but Dawn stands up to her. Madison acknowledges that there might be a lesson for her but says that she doesn't care. Guest stars: Kyla-Drew Simmons as Mae, Jessica Belkin as Madison, Elisha Henig as Lucas, Bob Pflugfelder as Science Bob (himself)
23	3	"Urban Legend Outfitters"	Eric Dean Seaton	Andrew Hill Newman	June 6, 2015	202	1.08
Dawn wants to increase viewership for Fuzzfeed, the school's online newspaper she runs with Mae. So, against Mae's wish, she runs a fake story based on an urban legend about Pigfoot, who is said to be half-man, half-pig. This works but the students demand to see the legendary Pigfoot. She convinces Nicky to pretend to be the legendary Pigfoot to trick them but it backfires and everyone turns against her. To make it up to them, Dawn tracks down the real Pigfoot, a young man who reveals that he's not actually part-pig, and explains how the rumor started. Dawn apologizes to Mae for choosing popularity over the truth. Guest stars: Kyla-Drew Simmons as Mae, Jason Sims-Prewitt as Principal Tarian
24	4	"Do-It-All Dawn"	Trevor Kirschner	Douglas Danger Lieblein	June 13, 2015	204	1.10
Dawn joins the orchestra music group and starts playing the tuba in addition to being already in the soccer team. She says she can do it all but she struggles to balance both activities. Her brothers complain that they have to attend Dawn's soccer games and concerts, but they eventually see it as an opportunity to sell snacks. When a soccer game and an orchestra performance gets scheduled on the same evening, she enlists her brothers to help her switch between the game and the performance without their parents noticing. She almost makes it without getting caught. After being busted, she admits that she is struggling to balance both activities. Guest stars: Elisha Henig as Lucas, Lori Alan as Ms. Bing
25	5	"Unhappy Campers"	Robbie Countryman	Natalie Barbrie & Tim Brenner	June 20, 2015	205	1.48
The Harper quads signup for a summer camp but they can't stop fighting. They agree to pretend that they don't know each other once they get to the camp. At the camp, Dawn's group just wants to talk about boys and refuses to do camp activities with her unless she admits that Dicky is her boyfriend. So, she convinces Dicky to pretend to be her boyfriend. After hearing about them, Ricky asks Dawn to be his fake girlfriend too so that the smart boys will let him use a telescope. To help Ty, a brokenhearted camp counselor, Nicky lies to him that Dawn broke his heart too. In appreciation, Ty helps Nicky and Dawn get back together. The boys start fighting for Dawn, but after a bear scare, they admit that they would have had more fun if they just worked together. Guest stars: Ramy Youssef as Ty, Hannah Nordberg as Sienna, Jillian Shea Spaeder as McKenna
26	6	"Mall in the Family"	Shannon Flynn	David L. Moses & Steven James Meyer	June 27, 2015	207	1.75
The quads think that now that they are 11 that they are old enough to wander around the mall without their parents, but Nicky ends up getting lotion in his eyes, Dawn puts on way too much make up, Dicky loses his pants, and Ricky gets a helicopter stuck to his head, in addition to spending all their money. Meanwhile, Tom and Anne are stuck at the phone store due to technical problems with Tom's phone. Guest stars: Sydney Park as Randee, Niko Guardado as Jaymis
27	7	"I Want Candace"	Eric Dean Seaton	Michael Feldman	July 11, 2015	209	1.31
Dawn is about to win a lunch with her idol Candace Parker when her brothers accidentally cut the phone cord. She gets so mad that she stops talking to them. To make it up to her, the boys take her to Candace's bus since she's in town. The quads get inside and Dawn takes photos with Candace's stuff. Before they can leave, the driver comes in and mistakes them for a Russian dance group, From Russia with Funk who were supposed to perform for a workout music video with Candace. It turns out Tom had organized for Candace to perform at Get Sporty as a surprise for Dawn. Dawn is glad to finally meet Candace but Candace is disappointed they can't dance as she expected. The bus driver then brings in the real From Russia with Funk. Dawn apologizes to Candace and Candace understands because she has brothers too who mess up everything for her. Guest stars: Candace Parker as herself, Brian Baumgartner as JD McCoy, Kyla-Drew Simmons as Mae, Shad Gaspard as Lou
28	8	"Sweet Foot Rides"	Jody Margolin Hahn	Matt Fleckenstein	July 18, 2015	208	1.11
Tom comes up with an idea for shoes that can be modified on the go to do lots of different things. The quads suggest calling them "Sweet Foot Rides." When Doyle, a footwear investor comes to Tom's Get Sporty, the quads ask their dad to pitch his idea to him. After Doyle leaves, they notice the shoes missing and conclude that Doyle stole them. They sneak into his hotel room to steal them back. When Tom reveals that he is the one who gave Doyle the shoes, the quads sneak back in again to return the shoes. However, they get distracted and start jumping on the bed until Doyle arrives. Dawn uses the shoes to jump and hide, hanging on the chandelier from where she falls, and pretends it's part of the presentation. The investor agrees to take the shoes but says it could take years before the Sweet Foot Rides are certified. Guest stars: Shane Blades as Doyle Thomas, Zoë Chao as Ms. Apollo
29	9	"The Mighty Quad Squad"	Trevor Kirschner	Gigi McCreery & Perry Rein	July 25, 2015	212	1.24
The quads create superhero costumes for a child's birthday party. All the children at the party like Ricky, Dicky and Dawn's costumes, but hate Nicky's costume because he doesn't have a good superpower. Later, a boy comes to the Harper house, and Dicky, Ricky, and Dawn think he's talking about them, but he is talking about Nicky's video of him as Goggle Man going viral, and this causes the popularity to go to Nicky's head. Meanwhile, the mayor comes to tell Tom that his son wants a party and only wants Flying Goggle Boy. The other children later attempt to be different superheroes, but the children still prefer Nicky. Eventually, Ricky, Dicky, and Dawn help Nicky remember who he is: another quadruplet just like them. In the end, Nicky learns that popularity isn't everything. Guest stars: Phill Lewis as Mayor, Damarr Calhoun as Archie, Aiden Lewandowski as Stevie
30	10	"Quaddy-Shack"	Eric Dean Seaton	Tim Brenner & Natalie Barbrie	November 11, 2015	218	1.79
The Harper quads are testing out their dad's new mini golf course at Get Sporty. Ricky gets mad because his siblings are not taking mini golf seriously. When Madison and her snobby country club friends arrive, they start making fun of the mini golf course and Ricky agrees with them. Madison invites Ricky to join them at the Boulderly Hills Country Club mini golf course but he doesn't take the offer right away. The following day, Ricky fights with his siblings for being immature. So, he storms off and agrees to take Madison's offer. Dawn pushes Nicky and Dicky to go to the country club and prove that they're just as good as Ricky. At the country club, Ricky tells them that they don't belong and calls them classless garbage eaters. They challenge Ricky and Madison for a competition. During the game, Ricky notices Madison cheating by adjusting a golf ball with her foot. Madison says it's only cheating if anyone sees it. When the game ends close to a tie, Ricky feels that they didn't deserve the win and reveals that Madison cheated. Madison denies it but when she accidentally pushes Dawn's ball into the hole, Ricky declares the Harpers as the winners. He quits Madison's team and rejoins his siblings. Guest stars: Jessica Belkin as Madison, BJ Tanner as Spaulding
31	11	"Go Hollywood"	Jonathan Judge	Michael Feldman & Matt Fleckenstein	November 25, 2015	213–214	1.77
The Harper quadruplets win a trip for their family to go to Hollywood. However, misadventures begin upon arrival when their bags go missing. They get entangled with two criminal gangs, one of which includes Jack Griffo, whom they recognize as Max from their favorite show, The Thundermans. While being chased by Jack's gang, the quads run into a lot of favorite Hollywood stars including Daniella Monet, Dana Snyder and Every Witch Way cast. At the end of the disastrous day, the quads run into an auditorium filled with people watching them on the big screen. It turns out that the entire disaster was staged to give the quads a Hollywood adventure they will never forget. Guest stars: Jack Griffo as himself, Ciara as herself, Alex Guarnaschelli as herself, Daniella Monet as herself, Lou Ferrigno Jr. as Jett Masterson, Leslie Grossman as Robin, Steve Valentine as The Great Billini, Danny Woodburn as Gayle, Wendie Malick as GPS Voice Over, Brian Posehn as Tour Guide, Paris Smith as herself, Autumn Wendel as herself, Denisea Wilson as herself Note: This is a double-length special episode.
32	12	"Rock 'n' Rules"	Marian Deaton	Suzie V. Freeman & Sarah Jane Cunningham	January 9, 2016	215	1.47
Anne is hesitant on going to a weekend spa due to previous events that have transpired when she was gone. Tom sets some pretty strict rules for the children; when they get upset about the rules, he mentions that when they pay the rent, they can make up the rules. Shortly after, Dawn gets the idea to open a lemonade stand so they can raise money; however, it goes awry when the quads let a teenager and the rest of his band rent out the garage. Meanwhile, Anne's massage is also not going so well because the masseuse keeps being interrupted with phone calls and is letting conflicts at home affect her massaging skills. Meanwhile, Tom and the quads try to out-noise the band in order to get it to leave. Anne later shows up to find the house a mess, but is not upset with Tom or the children because she was expecting a lot worse. Guest stars: Jimmy Deshler as Declan, Amber Friendly as Nilla
33	13	"Ballet and the Beasts"	Robbie Countryman	Andrew Hill Newman	January 16, 2016	217	1.64
Dawn is tired of always being on a team with her brothers, so she joins a ballet class with Mae; however, the boys believe that she needs them, so they also join the class. Dawn confronts them after class at Get Sporty and they get into a fight about who needs who, leading the boys to quit. A talented ballerina in the class, Eiffel, says that she needs the boys to make her look good and tells Dawn not to come back to class without them. Mae tries to stick up for Dawn, but the girls kick her out, too. Meanwhile, Tom and Anne are thinking of ways to make their 10% sale a success and realize that the last time the sale was a hit was the same year that Anne was pregnant with the quads as people felt sympathy for her, so they decide to make it look like Anne is having another baby to hopefully make more money. They keep the charade up until Anne has a talk with Dawn about honesty, leading her to feel guilty about lying to the customers and refuses to keep lying, despite Tom's thoughts on the subject. In the end, Nicky, Ricky, and Dicky find three more boys to take their places in ballet class, much to Dawn and Mae's relief, and Tom and Anne decide to use their first idea to promote the sale by dressing up Squishy Paws as a sailor dog. Guest stars: Kyla-Drew Simmons as Mae, Maddie Ziegler as Eiffel
34	14	"She Blinded Him with Science (Bob)"	David Kendall	Amy Pittman	January 23, 2016	211	1.64
Nicky, Dicky, and Dawn attempt to make Ricky believe in superstition, but after two attempts end in disaster, they come up with a fool-proof plan, causing the bathroom to fall apart as Ricky is brushing his teeth, leading him to lose all trust in science. When they come back downstairs later, Ricky is on the couch, absent-minded and rocking himself back and forth, staring blankly into space. Nicky, Dicky, and Dawn try to convince him otherwise, telling him that everything was set up, when the lights temporarily shut off. Nicky and Dicky ask Dawn if that was also set up, and when she denies it, the other two boys join Ricky on the couch. When Nicky, Ricky, and Dicky decide that Dawn is a bad luck charm, Mae gets Science Bob to help out. Guest stars: Bob Pflugfelder as Science Bob (himself), Kyla-Drew Simmons as Mae
35	15	"Harpers for President"	Robbie Countryman	Eric Goldberg & Peter Tibbals	January 30, 2016	206	1.71
Dawn nominates Ricky to run for class president but instead of being grateful, Ricky brags that Dawn knows he's better at it than her. So, Dawn gets mad and decides to run against him. Dicky remains on Ricky's side while Nicky supports Dawn instead. Out of selfish reasons, both Nicky and Dicky decide to run for class president as well. At first, the quads try to run a clean campaign but it eventually turns into a negative campaign. The election results in a four-way tie between the Harper quads. Ricky tricks the others to quit by lying to them that being a class president is a lot of work. Guest stars: Kyla-Drew Simmons as Mae, Ian Reed Kesler as Mr. Williams
36	16	"Doggy Door Afternoon"	Jody Margolin Hahn	Paul Ciancarelli	February 6, 2016	216	1.59
The quads are tired of having a babysitter and want to stay home alone while Tom and Anne go out for date night. Dawn suggests that Ricky be the captain, but it turns out to be trap as she only said that to get Tom and Anne out of the house. However, when Dawn lets Squishy out into the backyard through the doggy door, things go wrong when Squishy digs out and escapes. The quads manage to track him down to El Pepper Pot, but unfortunately this is where their parents are having their date night. They put on sombreros to avoid being seen, but Dawn is almost caught when Tom mistakes her for their waiter. Ricky lures Squishy out with his favorite treat, nacho balls, but Ricky drops the bag and Squishy takes off for home. When the quads arrive home, they discover that all doors are locked and Squishy is having a dog party in the kitchen, so they try going in through the doggy door, but they all try at the same time and get stuck. A big dog then comes up to the quads and shakes slobber all over them. Meanwhile, Tom is having major stomachaches from eating too much food due to worrying about the children, so he and Anne leave the restaurant and head for home. Back at the house, Dicky gets the bright idea for him and the others to dance their way out of the doggy door, which works a little from the dog slobber. However, it's not enough, but Dicky has bad breath and belches to lure the dog over and lick everybody. However, when the quads manage to get back into the kitchen, they discover that the living room is also a mess and must clean up the house before their parents arrive. The quads manage to clean up the house, but are caught when Tom finds a small dog in the cabinet when trying to get some tea for his stomach.
37	17	"Three Men and a Mae B."	Eric Dean Seaton	Douglas Danger Lieblein	February 13, 2016	220	1.53
When Anne goes away to visit her mom, Nicky, Ricky, and Dicky start to miss her. This takes shape in the form of falling in love with Mae, who has the skills of a mother with them. Nicky is the first one to fall in love with Mae when he asks Dawn for advice on feelings he has for a girl. She suggests that he writes her a poem, but when she figures out it's Mae, she tries to sabotage Nicky multiple times, during which she tries asking Tom for advice, but ends up doing all the talking and giving advice to herself. Dicky is the second one to fall in love with Mae when Mae bandages a cut on his finger. Dawn again asks her father for advice, but does all the talking again. Dawn also continuously tries to sabotage him. Ricky is the third one to fall in love with Mae when Dawn tries to get him to help the others fall out of love with Mae. Later, when all the boys come to talk to Mae and begin arguing, Dawn discovers that they aren't in love with Mae, but they have just been missing Anne, and also tells them the truth about how she's been trying to sabotage their attempts at getting together with Mae. Guest stars: Kyla-Drew Simmons as Mae, Jason Sims-Prewitt as Principal Tarian
38	18	"Diary of an Angry Quad"	Brian Stepanek	Teleplay by : Douglas Danger Lieblein; Story by : Natalie Barbrie & Tim Brenner	February 20, 2016	225	1.67
Angry at her brothers for reading her diary, Dawn gets revenge by writing fake entries and the boys believe it at first. To up her game, Dawn makes an entry in which she says that two of her brothers are plotting against the other by destroying what he values most. This leads the boys to not trust each other. Each of the boys starts kissing up to Dawn to tell him what the others are plotting against him. Eventually, the boys overhear Dawn and Mae laughing at them for believing entries. To get back at Dawn by guilting her, they pretend that Dicky shaved his brothers' hair, but Dawn already knows they're faking. In the chaos, Dicky ends up cutting his hair for real. As a punishment, the parents make all the quads go bald. Guest star: Kyla-Drew Simmons as Mae
39	19	"Quad Court"	David Kendall	Douglas Danger Lieblein	February 27, 2016	210	1.48
Anne wants the family to start eating healthy which causes the quads to start craving their classmates' foods at school. When Mae and Molly ask them to settle an argument, the quads see it as an opportunity to start a Quad Court where they settle disagreements among students and in exchange they get paid in food. With no more cases to solve, the quads decide to stir up trouble in order to get more cases and get food. They frame Mack by filling another student's locker with golf balls from Tom's Get Sporty. When Principal Tarian threatens to suspend Mack, the quads invite him to the Quad Court to prove that it was them who framed Mack. He doesn't believe them until Tom comes in and starts licking the candy-coated balls, proving that they're his. Anne realizes that she was too strict on them with her healthy diet. Guest stars: Kyla-Drew Simmons as Mae, Jason Sims-Prewitt as Principal Tarian, Lincoln Melcher as Mack
40	20	"The Quad-Plex"	Trevor Kirschner	Steven James Meyer & David L. Moses	March 5, 2016	219	1.44
Dawn and Mack make a pact to see a movie together. When a cool student Derek Moses tells them it's uncool to see a movie with parents, Dawn lies to Mack that she's sick. The quads convince their parents to go to another movie complex where their friends can't see them. Surprisingly, they find most of their friends, including Mack, at that complex. When Dawn notices Mack going to see their movie without her, she angry-calls him for breaking their movie pact. She enlists her brothers to delete the voicemail before Mack hears it. In the chaos, Moses busts them and mocks them for going to see a movie with their parents. Their friends reveal that they had gone to that theater too because they were afraid of Moses. It turns out that the only reason Moses' mother allows him to go to the movies alone is because she works there. Guest stars: Lincoln Melcher as Mack, Isaak Presley as Moses
41	21	"Nicky, Ricky, Dicky & Sicky"	Trevor Kirschner	Angeline Olschewski & Amy Pittman	July 9, 2016	224	1.37
When Dawn becomes sick and her trip to the museum to see this year's epic moment is threatened, she seeks the help of Ricky who is the master of acting like he's always physically fine even when he's not. She is almost stopped from going when Anne says Dawn feels warm and gets the thermometer due to a nasty bug going around, but Nicky and Ricky help her out by telling Anne to check Dicky's overnight bag to make sure it is packed properly. While Anne's focus is on the overnight bag, Ricky asks Nicky to put the thermometer into his mouth for a normal temperature reading who then asks Dicky to do so because he doesn't want to get sick. Dicky then puts the thermometer into Squishy Paws' mouth as he also doesn't want to get sick. When Anne shifts her focus back over to Dawn and takes the thermometer out, it reads a normal temperature, though Anne makes mention that it smells like dog. Later at the museum, Dawn is almost exposed when Principal Tarian makes it clear he won't have any sick children on the trip because he refuses to miss his grandmother's 90th birthday. However, things go awry when Nicky, Ricky, and Dicky also become sick and then later all four of them get stuck inside a caveman exhibit after trying to find a soundproof place to sneeze all they want. While the other children and Principal Tarian are viewing something on the wall in front of the exhibit shortly after, Dawn tries to get Mae's attention, but Principal Tarian notices the sick Harper quads who then throw up one by one and are later sent home. Back at the house, the quads are resting miserably alongside Anne, Tom, and Squishy Paws who had also become sick, though Tom couldn't exactly figure out how Squishy Paws became sick. Guest stars: Kyla-Drew Simmons as Mae, Jason Sims-Prewitt as Principal Tarian
42	22	"Mission: Un-Quaddable"	Michael Feldman	Teleplay by : Matt Fleckenstein; Story by : Michael Feldman	July 16, 2016	226	1.46
The Quads get an unexpected visit from the news crew one day, who ask if an actor named JT Steele is staying at their house. Dawn denies the accusations, as she has no knowledge of his whereabouts. Tom makes them leave by trying to advertise Get Sporty, and all seems good until Anne and Tom walks in, and that “Tom” is actually JT Steele. Excited by his appearance, the quads are eager to tell their friends that he’s at their house, however JT demands they keep his location a secret, in order to accompany the role of a typical suburban father. Tom and Anne leave the children with JT while they go to his luxurious condo for a while. Things begin to go awry in the Harper household when JT sends the children to school with $400 and brown-bagging their lunch, making the quads suspicious, and it gets increasingly difficult for the quads to keep their secret. When Nicky, Ricky, Dicky and Dawn suggest to JT about hosting a barbecue with a few friends, he seems opposed to the idea. Dawn accidentally breaks JT and makes him consider quitting being a dad and an actor (“dacting”) by saying “you don’t got this” to him and he later falls asleep after drinking warm milk, causing the quads to panic, although they lie to their parents that everything is fine, whom in turn lie to the children as well because Tom accidentally destroyed one of JT’s awards in his condo. When Mae and her friends arrive, the quads attempt to keep their friends from figuring out that JT is asleep, but it doesn’t go as planned when Sharon Dee and her crew from the TV network appear, and Dicky mistakenly tells Sharon that JT is quitting show business. In a last-ditch effort to save his career from being ruined, the quads try to get JT to save the barbecue by getting chips to go with the dip, which he does, saving his career. He then leaves just as Tom and Anne get back from the condo. Guest stars: Kyla-Drew Simmons as Mae, Tony Cavalero as JT Steele, Valeria Maldonado as Sharon Dee
43	23	"A Brief Case of Popularity"	Robbie Countryman	David DiPietro	July 23, 2016	221	1.35
Nicky, Dicky, and Dawn want to get an invite to the cool student stairs; however, just the chance is put in jeopardy when Ricky dresses in an uncool manner. Later, while Ricky is asleep, Nicky, Dicky, and Dawn take away all of his uncool belongings, and Dicky then hides them. However, Ricky finds them in the freezer the following morning when Dicky lets it slip out that he hid them in there because he thought it would make them cooler. Later at school, Nicky, Dicky, Dawn, and later Mae try to create a hall wall in front of Ricky so the cool stair students don't see him. Nicky, Dicky, and Dawn then take all of the uncool articles of clothing off Ricky and put them on themselves. The quads then get into an argument, with Ricky pretending to be Nicky, Dicky, and Dawn and mocking them, and Nicky, Dicky, and Dawn pretending to be Ricky and mocking him. However, things take an even worse turn when Moses sees this and gives Nicky, Dicky, and Dawn uncool nicknames—Suspender Girl, Visor Boy, and Briefcase Man—and Ricky is then invited to be on the stairs with the other cool students and receives the nickname R-Man. Ricky eventually works his way to the top of the stairs, but Nicky, Dicky, and Dawn start coming up with a plan to get revenge. The next day at school, Nicky, Dicky, and Dawn all dress cool and start releasing some of Ricky's secrets; however, it takes mentioning that he sleep rhymes for the cool students to question Ricky's coolness. Ricky tries to cover it up by saying they're sleep raps instead and is forced into rapping, but fails and the other students laugh at him. Nicky, Dicky, and Dawn then feel bad for him and climb to the top of the stairs to rap alongside him. The rap is a success, but the quads then fall down the stairs and are consequently kicked off the stairs. Guest stars: Kyla-Drew Simmons as Mae, Isaak Presley as Moses, Spencer Tomich as Trey, Molly Jackson as Brianna, Will Babbitt as Marshall Absent: Brian Stepanek as Tom
44	24	"New Kid on the Block"	Marian Deaton	Teleplay by : Andrew Hill Newman; Story by : David L. Moses & Steven James Meyer	July 30, 2016	223	1.65
Dawn catches her brothers spying on their new neighbors moving in, though she's not aware that they're new neighbors and mentions that the FBI made it very clear they weren't to spy on their previous neighbors. When she's made aware that they're new neighbors, she brings up how she and her brothers can finally gain access to the tree house at that house. They discover that the new neighbors have a child named Syd and begin plotting on how to use her for their own needs. The next day at school, they make an attempt at introducing themselves to Syd, but she's not interested and leaves. It's later discovered at Syd's house that Syd and her family were told to stay away from the Harper family due to the quads' bad reputation, though Syd doesn't personally care about their alleged bad reputation, but because she has a bad side as well, she thinks it's best not to make friends with the quads. She also has a history at other schools, and it's the reason why her and her family moved, and if she messes up again, she'll be sent to boarding school. However, things go awry when Dawn and Syd are playing croquet while Dawn's brothers are setting up a table. Dicky forgets to lock the table's legs, causing the table to collapse; when Dawn hits the croquet ball, the table acts as a ramp and causes the ball to injure Ann, who almost catches the quads and Syd. This causes Syd to lose control and get in touch with her bad side again, and she begins swinging at and breaking windows with the croquet balls. The next day at school, the quads learn from Mae that Syd has stolen the answer book for the day's test in Mr. Williams' class; that night, Dawn tries to get the book back in the tree house, but is caught by Syd who is acting even more crazy than before. When Dawn and Syd begin fighting over red paint Syd wants to use to put in balloons and throw at cars, Dawn's brothers rush over to the tree house as they believe the paint to be blood. Syd then begins to realize the error of her ways and her and the quads truly bond for the first time. Unfortunately, the tree house then falls to the ground when a bird lands on it after Syd had mentioned earlier how her father said the tree house could only support two people, but it is still intact. However, a feather then lands on the floor and causes the walls and roof to collapse. Guest stars: Kyla-Drew Simmons as Mae, Ashley Liao as Syd Absent: Brian Stepanek as Tom
45	25	"The Tell-Tale Art"	Jody Margolin Hahn	Sarah Jane Cunningham & Suzie V. Freeman	August 6, 2016	222	1.31
Ricky becomes insecure because his siblings are better than him in art class. He makes a deal with Dicky to pretend that Dicky's painting is his. In return, he helps Dicky come up with great ideas in Dawn's class committee to impress girls. Dawn becomes suspicious that Ricky and Dicky are up to something and vows to get to the bottom of it. She exposes Ricky as fraud by convincing the teacher to make Ricky draw a new painting in front of the whole school. Meanwhile, Nicky's food art keeps getting lost because the art teacher has been eating it. The quads make up and agree to take a photo together but start fighting over whose idea the photo booth was. Guest stars: Kyla-Drew Simmons as Mae, Mary Birdsong as Ms. Gressle Absent: Brian Stepanek as Tom

=== Season 3 (2017) ===
No. overall	No. in season	Title	Directed by	Written by	Original release date	Prod. code	U.S. viewers (millions)
46	1	"Quad with a Blog"	Eric Dean Seaton	Paul Ciancarelli & David DiPietro	January 7, 2017	301	1.58
Tom's Get Sporty cafe has been losing customers lately due to increased competition. The quads try to convince their friends to eat at the cafe. They even conduct a research which reveals that their parents are the problem. So, the quads make the cafe a "no-parent" zone but that doesn't get their friends to come. The quads decide to work on a new signature dish and have the Gourmet Guy review it on his blog. Unfortunately, they can't agree on one idea. They agree to combine the four different dishes into one dish and invite the Gourmet Guy to review. They serve the dish to a customer they believe to be the Gourmet Guy. The Gourmet Guy gives it a bad review. While trying to figure out why he gave it a bad review, they realize that Nicky is the Gourmet Guy. Dawn, Ricky and Dicky pressure Nicky into giving their dish a good review but he says that as a food critic, he has to be honest with himself. This leads to a food fight among the quads. They explain to their parents that they were just trying to save the cafe. At the end, Tom and Anne accidentally sets the cafe on fire. Guest stars: Siena Agudong as Natlee, Molly Jackson as Brianna, Spencer Tomich as Trey, Tom Choi as Sophisticated Guy
47	2	"Odd Quad Out"	Robbie Countryman	Amy Pittman	January 14, 2017	302	1.84
The Harper quads are preparing for Honest Abe's tire commercial. They are mad that he makes them dress ridiculously and doesn't even bother to learn their names. They stand up to Honest Abe, but he fires them and introduces a new set of quads, the Kramden quads. Unlike the Harper quads who have nothing in common, the Kramden quads are identical, love each other and do everything in unison. Honest Abe and Principal Tarian arrange for the Kramdens to come to Edgewood School to talk about tire safety. This makes the Harpers jealous and they set out on a mission to prove that the Kramdens are not real quads. The Harper quads go undercover to collect the Kramdens' DNA, but the Kramdens argue that the Harpers are the ones who aren't real quads. Mae takes the Harper quads' DNA to prove that they're related, but the results show one of them is different. While waiting for more information, the Harpers start fighting over which one of them isn't a quad. With their parents' help, they agree that it doesn't matter whether they're biologically quads or not. They are quads. Mae then comes back and reveals that the odd DNA was actually from their dog, Squishy Paws. Guest stars: Jason Sims-Prewitt as Principal Tarian, Lydia Bolland as Molly, Butch Klein as Honest Abe
48	3	"Keeping Up with the Quadashians"	Trevor Kirschner	Douglas Danger Lieblein	January 21, 2017	303	1.59
The quads become obsessed with the reality show "Life of Eiffel", starring Eiffel and her sister Lilly. The quads know Eiffel and Lilly personally because they've worked with them in camp and ballet, respectively. In the show, Lilly uninvites Eiffel from a party, claiming that she makes it odd while Lilly brags as the toilet paper princess. The quads love the drama in the show so much that they start acting it out. When their parents urge them to stop spending too much time watching it, the quads agree to start their own reality show, "Hanging with the Harpers". Dooley provides them with the cameras and equipment needed. To create drama for the show, the quads pressure Mae into uninviting someone from her birthday party. When Mae refuses, the quads decide to vote one of them out. When Ricky is voted out, he starts his own show, "Strictly Ricky". Ricky comes to Mae's party and starts fighting with his siblings for Mae's attention. When the quad fight ends up ruining Mae's party, the quads agree that they let it get out of control. They allow Dooley to remove the cameras and delete the videos. Guest stars: Maddie Ziegler as Eiffel, Mackenzie Ziegler as Lilly, Hayden Crawford as Dooley, Theodore John Barnes as Miles
49	4	"The Great Mullet Caper"	Jody Margolin Hahn	Steven James Meyer & David L. Moses	January 28, 2017	304	1.53
After the fire that destroyed Get Sporty Cafe, the Harper quads fight over ideas for the new cafe theme. Anne and Tom reject the quadruplets' ideas and announce that they will use an ice-dancing theme since that was always their dream. The only thing stopping them is their missing practice skates. Mae and the quads agree that ice-dancing cafe would be very embarrassing. So, the quads sneak out to the roadhouse where Tom and Anne used to work in order to hide the skates and prevent their parents from ever finding them. The roadhouse turns out to be a hockey-players hangout where ice-dancers are hated and discriminated against. The quads learn all the struggle the parents went through to keep their ice-dancing secret before they were exposed. So, Dawn leads her brothers to stand up for ice-dancers. Dawn takes down four hockey mullets by throwing her brothers at them. The quads realize that they shouldn't have been quick to judge their parents. When the skates get accidentally burned after the fight, Tom and Anne agree to put a theme that combines all the ideas from their quads. Guest stars: Maia Shibutani as herself, Alex Shibutani as himself, Tiffany Jeneen as Fran
50	5	"Quadsled"	Trevor Kirschner	Andrew Hill Newman	February 4, 2017	305	1.58
The Harper quads are preparing for an upcoming four-man bobsled race in the mountains. They have lost the past three years despite having no one competing against them because one of them always messes up. Dawn is confident they will win this year, but then their hopes are shut down when the Kramden quads show up and announce that they're participating in the race. The Harpers become nervous, feeling threatened by the Kramdens. Mae, declaring herself the fifth quad, offers to help in case any one of them can't make it. The quads become so nervous that they barely sleep that night. Mae sleeps over at Dawn's bedroom. Dawn keeps her leg up before sleeping. Mae can't sleep without folding clothes. Nicky keeps adjusting his alarm clocks until he gets kicked out of the boys' bedroom. Dicky keeps asking Ricky questions. Eventually, each one of the quads fakes being sick and asks Mae to step in as the fifth quad. They start fighting over who Mae should replace. Mae confronts them for not even trying. Early the following morning, the quads fall asleep in the sled. Their heavy weight causes them to sled faster than the Kramdens and beat them in their sleep.
51	6	"Ye Olde Hand Holde"	Marian Deaton	Patrice Asuncion & Nick Rossitto	February 11, 2017	309	1.52
Dawn makes fun of her brothers for not being as mature as her and asks Mack to go to the upcoming medieval-themed Renaissance fair with her. She also gets Mae and Miles to come along. Her brothers become insecure that Dawn might be more mature. Dooley incites the quads to do a mature-off contest to figure out who is more mature by completing the triangle of romance: mind, body and soul. To complete it, one has to get a date, hold hands romantically and look into each other's eyes. Nicky, Ricky and Dicky ask out Avery, June and Brianna to be their dates. During the fair, both Dawn and her brothers try, but fail, to get their dates to hold hands and look into each other's eyes. The rules of the challenge keep changing until the final version involves fighting with turkey legs. When the boys get a chance to go ahead of Dawn, they can't agree on which one of them should be left standing, so they stop fighting as a team. Anne tells them that the triangle of romance is ridiculous and they shouldn't try to force it. When they are ready to date, they will know—just like Mae and Miles. Guest stars: Hayden Crawford as Dooley, Theodore John Barnes as Miles, Lincoln Melcher as Mack
52	7	"What's the Worst That Quad Happen?"	Lynn McCracken	Peter Dirksen & Jonathan Howard	March 18, 2017	310	1.25
As the quads return from spending a weekend at their grandmother's house, she buys them a gift for good behavior. Tom and Anne ask the children not to open the gift early. Nicky, Dicky and Dawn want to open it but Ricky tries to stop them. They ask him what's the worst that could happen. The quads open the gift anyway. They find a drone and start playing with it. They end up breaking a lot of things in the house. When the drone flies out of the window, they discover a lot of bikes in Dooley's backyard. They conclude that Dooley has been stealing bikes since he had shown fascination in bikes earlier. The quads put the bikes in their garage planning to return them to their rightful owners. The bikes get stolen. So, they borrow a bike from Get Sporty to use as bait. They forget keys on the doorknob, causing the store to get robbed. Dooley arrives and unmasks himself revealing that it's actually their grandmother. She frames Nicky, Dicky and Dawn for stealing. The cops take Ricky's siblings away, to jail. It is then revealed that they're still in the kitchen about to open the gift. It was all Ricky's story explaining what's the worst that could happen. Guest stars: Hayden Crawford as Dooley, Dale Raqul as Grandma Harper
53	8	"To Be Invited or Not to Be"	Robbie Countryman	Andrew Hill Newman	March 25, 2017	313	1.50
Tom and Anne try to push the quads to make friends with Simone, a new person in town, and the quads agree after realizing that Simone is an inventor with a lot of cool inventions. Simone invites them over to her house and shows off her invisibility cloaks among other inventions. She tells them to keep her inventions secret because she hates when her ideas get out. The next day, Simone's butler comes to invite the quads except Dicky. She continues inviting one less quad until only Nicky is left. During the last invite, the butler asks the quads about Simone's new inventions. They lie to him. Dawn concludes that the butler is the one who has been stealing Simone's ideas, so she and Ricky sneak in to tell Simone the truth, despite not being invited. They hide to wait for the perfect moment, but Simone finds them. Simone reveals that she was only testing them to see if they would reveal her secret and that the butler is actually her dad undercover. Dawn confronts Simone and tells her that if she wants to make real friends, she should learn to trust them instead of testing them. Guest stars: Breanna Yde as Simone, Michael Bunin as Carmichael
54	9	"Ele-Funk in the Room"	Eric Dean Seaton	Natalie Barbrie	April 8, 2017	307	1.37
Mae buys tickets to the Ele-Funk concert for her and the quads. However, when Dawn makes her wear an elephant head for the concert, Dawn's brothers convince Mae to stand up to Dawn and tell her that she's pushy. This causes Dawn to break up with Mae and both refuse to apologize. Dawn also forbids her brothers from attending the concert with Mae. Nicky, Ricky and Dicky try to get Dawn and Mae back together by trying different things including faking phone calls; however, it doesn't work out. Dawn pushes her brothers into a quad pact that none of them will see the concert without the rest of the quads. The boys, determined to attend the concert, break the pact by lying to Mae that Dawn is okay with them going without her. Natlee and June also push Dawn into breaking the quad pact by making her go to the concert with them. At the concert, they try to hide from each other until Dawn's elephant head gets stuck in an elevator door. Dawn and her brothers confront each other for betraying the quad pact. Mae apologizes for calling Dawn pushy and Dawn agrees that she can be pushy. They make up and enjoy the concert together. Guest star: Siena Agudong as Natlee
55	10	"Tween Wolf"	Robbie Countryman	Michael Feldman	April 15, 2017	308	1.52
During the annual summer camp, Dawn tells Mae, Natlee and June about how bad Dicky has been stinking lately. Natlee explains that Dicky is going through puberty because she saw the same thing happen to her older brother. Nicky and Ricky eavesdrop to the conversation and get it completely wrong. They "hear" that Natlee's brother got bit, turned into a werewolf and ate his parents, so they conclude that Dicky is turning into a werewolf as well since he had earlier said that he got bit by a bush. Nicky and Ricky lock Dicky in a room alone and explain to him that he's turning into a werewolf. Meanwhile, Mae helps Dawn realize that she's also going through puberty. She starts shaving to hide her hair, but accidentally cuts herself and screams. She lies to Nicky and Ricky that she got bit, but admits that she's going through the same changes as Dicky. They conclude that she's also becoming a werewolf and lock her up with Dicky. Dawn helps Dicky realize that they're just going through puberty. They plan to sneak out, but fall into a trash bin. When the rest of the campers see Dawn and Dicky approaching covered in trash, they all run, scared that Dicky and Dawn are really werewolves. Guest stars: Siena Agudong as Natlee, Hayden Crawford as Dooley, Theodore John Barnes as Miles
56	11	"This Little Piggy Went to the Harpers"	Jody Margolin Hahn	Jonathan Howard & Peter Dirksen	April 22, 2017	306	1.63
Dawn's soccer team, the Edgewood Buffalos, along with Ricky, Dicky and Mae come up with a plan to kidnap the Boulderly Hills War Pigs' mascot as revenge. The War Pigs, led by Nelly, had previously sabotaged the Buffalos' mascot, Mae. In the process, the quads forget about Anne's birthday. The quads kidnap and hide the pig in the closet, but when their mother sees it, they lie that it's their birthday gift for her. Nelly comes over looking for Piggly, her pig, but the quads lie that they didn't see it. After realizing that Piggly is more than a mascot to Nelly, the quads try to get the pig back from Anne, but she loves the "gift" so much. When Anne finally finds out that the pig belongs to Nelly, the quads confess about all their lies. Tom says he's taken care of the pig problem and made food, making the quads freak out, assuming that he had cooked the pig. They finally find Piggly and give him back to Nelly. The Harpers take a family photo as Anne's birthday gift to herself. Guest stars: Hayden Crawford as Dooley, Eve Moon as Nelly Miller
57	12	"I Want My Mae B. Back"	Eric Dean Seaton	Douglas Danger Lieblein	April 29, 2017	311	1.70
Since Mae and Miles started dating, it's become almost impossible for Dawn to have girl time with Mae, so Dawn blackmails her brothers into helping her keep Miles away from Mae. Nicky, Ricky and Dicky convince Miles to make himself unavailable so that Mae doesn't get sick of him. However, Mae so gets concerned that Miles doesn't want to hang out with her that Dawn feels guilty for splitting them, so Dawn calls her brothers to let Miles come back to Mae, but they tell her that Miles has taken off with Millie. Millie is a flight simulator, but Dawn assumes that Millie is another girl. Dawn gets furious at Miles and stalks his social media, where she finds a friend called Millie. Dawn confronts Millie for trying to steal Miles away from Mae, but Millie reveals that they're only friends because Miles' mom is her dentist. Dawn goes out to look for the other Millie and finds Miles, who reveals that her brothers also like Millie and are with Millie. Dawn is shocked to realize that Millie is a flight simulator. After overpowering her brothers and gaining entry into the simulator, she agrees that it was totally worth it. Mae and Miles become furious that Dawn was trying to separate them, so Dawn apologizes and Mae promises to spend more time with her. Guest star: Theodore John Barnes as Miles
58	13	"The Buffa-Lowdown"	Trevor Kirschner	Michael Feldman	May 6, 2017	314	1.28
The AV class is in charge of running morning school announcements with special TV newscasts of "The Edgewood Buffa-Lowdown". Ricky is the producer while Dawn and Mae are co-anchors. Dicky is a field reporter while Nicky is in charge of cafeteria updates. Despite Avery's bad performance as birthdays reporter, Ricky fires Mae and promotes Avery to be Dawn's co-anchor. Dawn confronts Ricky about the move, especially since Avery has a very bad exaggerated Valley girl accent. Ricky starts getting hiccups whenever Avery talks to him, making the quads realize that he has a crush on Avery. Dawn comes up with a plan to give Ricky confidence to talk to Avery by having her brothers and Mae try to imitate Avery's accent until Ricky gets used to it. They also plan for Ricky to propose to Avery to go to the dance with him. However, during the next Buffa-Lowdown, Dawn realizes that Avery has a crush on Nicky, so she tries to stop Ricky from embarrassing himself, but things go awry. Nicky says he wanted to ask Natlee, but Natlee wanted Dooley to ask her to the dance and things get out of control. Principal Tarian is disappointed, but Ricky manages to convince him that it was all part of the plan. Avery lets Ricky ask her out. Guest stars: Jason Sims-Prewitt as Principal Tarian, Theodore John Barnes as Miles, Siena Agudong as Natlee, Hayden Crawford as Dooley
59	14	"The Quadshank Redemption"	Brian Stepanek	Jeny Quine	May 13, 2017	320	1.30
The annual Edgewood School carnival is coming up and the Harper quads are excited to finally be the oldest class at the carnival. However, when Principal Tarian drops carnival tickets and the quads start fighting over them, they all get detention on the day of the carnival. They're joined in detention with other bad students—The Dozer, Texting Tina and Johnny Meatballs. Principal Tarian forces the students in detention to make cotton candy for the carnival outside, but the other students refuse to help the Harper quads. When Dicky wakes up the Dozer to help and the Dozer makes him leave the detention room, Nicky, Ricky and Dawn become worried and sneak out to help Dicky. The quads and the other bad students try to get Dicky back without being noticed by the principal. During the process, they learn that the other students aren't really bad. The Dozer always gets detention for sleeping in class because he has to take care of his baby brother. Texting Tina gets detention because she keeps texting in class with her best friend who just moved to New Zealand. The "bad" students make the Harpers realize that they're the selfish ones by reminding them of the many times they let their classmates down for being selfish. The quads realize that they shouldn't be quick to judge people. Guest stars: Jason Sims-Prewitt as Principal Tarian, Theodore John Barnes as Miles, Grant Durazzo as Johnny, Laya Deleon Hayes as Tina
60	15	"Not-So-Sweet Charity"	Neel Keller	Jonathan Howard & Peter Dirksen	May 20, 2017	318	1.54
Dawn has been secretly dating Joey Montagelli for a few weeks, hiding the relationship because the Harpers and the Montagellis are enemies who have always hated each other. While seeing Joey in an alley, Dawn notices that a goose named Charity has been hurt and can't fly to join its flock, so she and Mae decide to raise money to help Charity. Her brothers refuse to help at first, but change their mind after seeing Faith, Hope and Susan participating in the charity. To attract people to the charity and to impress the girls, Nicky, Ricky and Dicky get Joey to perform, but Dawn is worried that Joey's presence might expose their secret relationship. After realizing that Faith, Hope and Susan are falling in love with Joey as well, the boys lie to the girls that Joey is dating Dawn. The secret gets out and Joey gets grounded by his parents. Dawn blames Mae at first for the secret getting out before realizing that it was her brothers who did it by mistake. She gets furious at her brothers and tells them to get out of her life. When the boys try to help, but mess things up, Dawn says she's sick of the family feud and she would rather be a Montagelli. The boys go back to apologize to Dawn and get her to come back home. Guest stars: Ricardo Hurtado as Joey, Theodore John Barnes as Miles, Siena Agudong as Natlee, Hayden Crawford as Dooley
61	16	"One Quadzy Summer"	Lynn McCracken	David L. Moses & Steven James Meyer	June 3, 2017	319	1.45
Dawn and Mae get summer jobs at the exclusive Boulderly Hills Country Club children-only beach club. At the club, Madison makes fun of Dawn and Mae for not being members. To add to Dawn's disappointment, her brothers use their friend Trey to get into the country club. They make Dawn's job very difficult by making a lot of complex orders. When Nicky's sunscreen causes Dawn to trip and fall, Dawn's manager punishes her by making her Madison's new assistant, and Madison makes Dawn's life miserable. The only thing that makes Dawn's day better is when a cute DJ called Dylan makes it clear that he has a crush on Dawn, the beautiful blonde girl. Nicky, Ricky and Dicky are unable to pay their bills because they ordered everything expecting Trey to pay for them, so they're forced to help arrange for Madison's party. They notice Dylan flirting with Madison and inform Dawn about it, causing her to get mad that Dylan is using her and Madison. Despite their differences, she tells Madison the truth and that she deserves to have a good summer. Dawn, Mae and Madison get revenge on Dylan for cheating. After that, Dawn and Madison make it clear that they still hate each other. Guest stars: Theodore John Barnes as Miles, Jessica Belkin as Madison, Audrey Whitby as Tori, Spencer Tomich as Trey, Noah Urrea as Dylan
62	17	"Quad for Teacher"	Angela Gomes	Natalie Barbrie & Andrew Hill Newman	June 10, 2017	316	1.27
The Harper quads push their gym teacher to let them do whatever they want during PE, but when he finally gives in, the quads cause him to get hurt and sent to the hospital. The rest of the class blames the Harpers when Principal Tarian reveals that he will bring in a much tougher substitute gym teacher. The quads convince the principal to hire Tom as the coach and manage to trick their dad into letting the class do whatever they want. Unfortunately, he starts telling the class embarrassing stories about the quads as little children, so with Anne's help, the quads convince Principal Tarian to fire Tom and hire Anne instead. To their disappointment, every boy in the class develops a crush on Anne, so the quads go to the hospital to try to get their old coach back. When the nurse tells them that he's gone to "the big gym upstairs", the quads assume that the coach is dead and start talking about how important his lessons were. The coach comes back on a wheelchair and overhears them. They beg him to come back, promising to be more receptive of his PE exercises. Guest stars: Jason Sims-Prewitt as Principal Tarian, Michael Nanfria as Coach Fessler, Theodore John Barnes as Miles, Siena Agudong as Natlee, Spencer Tomich as Trey
63	18	"Quadpendence Day"	Robbie Countryman	Paul Ciancarelli & David DiPietro	June 17, 2017	315	1.51
Dawn wants to get her ears pierced because she can't use magnetic earrings due to her dense ear lobes, but Anne refuses to let her. Dawn gets upset and declares her own Independence Day where she doesn't have to get approval from her parents. Her brothers declare their own independence as well because they've been trying to get a snake, but Tom won't let them. After realizing that they can't get ears pierced or a snake without parents, the quads turn to Dooley. Dooley gets them an ear piercer and a snake. Mae pierces Dawn's ears. Dawn shops for earrings with her friends while trying to keep it a secret from Anne. Dawn's friends, Natlee, Avery and Brianna, reveal that their ears are not pierced and ask Mae to pierce them as well. Unfortunately, they all get infections because of the unsanitary piercing. This causes them to mess up during a recital, which later gets Dawn and her brothers busted. Guest stars: Buddy Handleson as Wally, Theodore John Barnes as Miles, Siena Agudong as Natlee, Hayden Crawford as Dooley, Lori Alan as Ms. Bing, Molly Jackson as Brianna, Gage Petrone as Franco
64	19	"Cementing the Quads' Legacy"	Marian Deaton	Amy Pittman	July 8, 2017	323	1.17
It's almost time for graduation for the Harper quads and they have been selected to be part of the class committee in charge of choosing the sayonara stunt for the outgoing class. The quads want to pull an epic stunt for their class to be remembered by. However, Principal Tarian gives Natlee a list of safe approved stunts to choose from, but the quads go against the rest of the committee to reject the list. Natlee tricks the quads into leaving the room by lying to them that they're part of a super secret committee for the class stunt. After realizing that they've been tricked, the quads trap Mae in their house and force her to tell them why the rest of the class didn't want them. Mae explains that the Harpers always "quad" things up with their shenanigans. The next day, the quads convince Natlee to let them back into the committee, promising to not quad things up. Unfortunately, the quads are not okay with Natlee's stunt which involves scribbling a tiny "2017" on wet cement. Dawn and her brothers separately sneak back to "fix" the class stunt so that they don't get blamed, but the quads get stuck in the cement while fighting. The rest of the class committee busts them. Dawn gives the committee an idea for an epic stunt that involves leaving their shoes stuck in cement, spelling "2017". This symbolizes that the class of 2017 has left big shoes to fill. Guest stars: Jason Sims-Prewitt as Principal Tarian, Theodore John Barnes as Miles, Siena Agudong as Natlee, Isabella Revel as Avery, Gage Petrone as Franco
65	20	"#QUADGOALS"	Brian Stepanek	David DiPietro & Paul Ciancarelli	July 15, 2017	312	1.05
The Harper and Kramden quads are fighting over which quads get to use the hashtag "quadgoals" and agree that the quads who get the most likes on a picture will get to keep the hashtag. Unfortunately, the Harpers are invited by Aunt Jackie to visit her at her farm which has no Internet access to post the quadgoals picture. Aunt Jackie shows them a set of butter sculptures that look exactly like Nicky, Ricky, Dicky and Dawn. She intends to present the butter sculptures for an art contest. While Aunt Jackie is away, Dawn accidentally breaks the electrical cord to the air conditioner keeping the room with the butter sculptures cool. The butter heads melt and the quads are unable to rebuild them in time, so they cover their heads with butter and pretend to be the sculptures. The art contest judges are impressed by the sculptures only to realize that they are actual children and Jackie gets disqualified. The quads use their butter head sculptures photo as their quadgoals picture which gets the most likes, making them win the hashtag. However, the Kramdens easily trick the Harper quads into giving up the quadgoals hashtag by acting sad, cute, adorable and vulnerable. Guest star: Jennifer Aspen as Aunt Jackie
66	21	"A Space Quadyssey"	Jody Margolin Hahn	Gigi McCreery & Perry Rein	July 22, 2017	317	1.41
Ricky records a video to submit for an application to be considered for the space program while his siblings keep interrupting. He uses it to prove why he needs space from the rest of the quads. To Ricky's disappointment, the video gives the head of the space program an idea to take quads into space. In another twist, the Harper quads have to compete for the spot against their rivals, the Kramden quads. During a series of challenges, the Kramdens easily beat the Harpers because Ricky keeps overthinking the tests and is not open-minded to thinking outside the box. Ricky freaks out and unleashes bees at the space station. The Harpers run to hide and end up in a space simulator. They accidentally trigger it, making them believe that they're actually in space. Their communication channel with the station is interrupted, making it impossible to get instructions on how to get back. When the communication issue is finally fixed, the quads are given instructions on how to stop the simulation. Dawn asks her brothers to stay a little longer in the space simulator because that's the closest that they're gotten to being in space. The Kramdens show up at the window, causing the Harper quads to freak out and accidentally turn off the simulator. Guest star: Londale Theus Jr. as Lonny Tusk
67	22	"YOCO"	Eric Dean Seaton	Nick Rossitto & Patrice Asuncion	July 29, 2017	324	1.24
While Tom and Anne are busy at the store, they leave the quads home alone with a smart speaker device called "YOCO". The quads take their time alone to break the rules, only to realize that YOCO has been recording everything they've been doing. They figure out their dad's password to reset YOCO so that she doesn't report the previous hours' activities. The next day, however, the quads try to reset YOCO after breaking items in the house, only to realize that YOCO's password has been changed. They decide to get rid of YOCO, but she turns out to be a big challenge, so they bury her in the backyard. Later that night, Dawn uses voice-over to pretend to be YOCO and fool her parents. The quads get busted when Squishy Paws comes in having unburied YOCO. Tom and Anne are disappointed to hear YOCO's report on what has happened. The quads convince Tom and Anne that YOCO is a bad idea by making her snitch on them as well and they all agree to get rid of YOCO. Guest star: Kari Wahlgren as YOCO (V.O.) Absent: Kyla-Drew Simmons as Mae
68	23	"The Wonderful Wizard of Quads"	Trevor Kirschner	Teleplay by : Michael Feldman & Douglas Danger Lieblein; Story by : Angeline Olschewski	August 5, 2017	321–322	2.00
Dawn signs up to audition for the role of Dorothy in a The Wizard of Oz play. Unfortunately, Rose Durkin also signs up for the role, putting pressure on Dawn to prove that she's the real Dorothy. Dawn becomes so obsessed with getting Dorothy's shoes and looking like Dorothy that she neglects to learn her lines properly. She fails the audition and Rose gets the role. Dawn becomes part of the stage crew and causes a prop accident that knocks out both her and Rose. While unconscious, Dawn dreams that she is in Oz still fighting with Rose over who's the real Dorothy. They break into a song, after which the Wicked Witch tricks Nicky, Ricky and Dicky into giving her the Dorothy shoes. The boys go after the Wicked Witch to get the shoes back for Dawn, but the Witch captures them. She locks them up in a cage next to Dr. Colosso from The Thundermans and threatens to destroy them after turning Dr. Colosso into soup. Meanwhile, Dawn goes to find the Wizard of Oz to prove that she's the real Dorothy. Rose follows her. Once she finds the location, she discovers that there are two Wizards of Oz. The Wizards of Oz keep Dawn waiting a long time while they try to decide on what to eat. Mae then pops in and reveals to Dawn that her brothers have been captured by the Wicked Witch. Dawn gives up the role and goes to save her brothers. The wizards declare Dawn as the real Dorothy because being Dorothy means acting like her, not looking like her. Dawn wakes up and agrees to let Rose play Dorothy. Unfortunately, Rose gets hurt on stage, so the director casts Dawn as the new Dorothy. Guest stars: Tia Mowry as Ericka Knightly, Gabby Douglas as Twisty, Jade Pettyjohn as Rose, Theodore John Barnes as Miles, Siena Agudong as Natlee, Gage Petrone as Franco, Isabella Revel as Avery Note: This is a double-length special episode.

=== Season 4 (2018) ===
No. overall	No. in season	Title	Directed by	Written by	Original release date	Prod. code	U.S. viewers (millions)
69	1	"Dude, Where's My School?"	Eric Dean Seaton	Douglas Danger Lieblein	January 6, 2018	401	1.08
Just after settling at Rothschild Prep with their friends, the Harper quads accidentally flood the school causing it to sink. They are forced to transfer to Boulder Academy high school. The quads unsuccessfully spend too much time and effort trying to make the best first impression at the new school. Mae and her other friends become suspicious that the quads were responsible for sinking their old school. With help from Sadie and Kipper, the quads' friends form a fake mystery solvers' club. They invite the Harpers and assign them to solve the case of the sunken school. The quads are caught red-handed trying to cover it up. Guest stars: Theodore John Barnes as Miles, Hayden Crawford as Dooley, Isabella Revel as Avery, Ariana Molkara as Sadie, Miles Elliot as Kipper
70	2	"Wrestle-Mae-nia"	Robbie Countryman	Natalie Barbrie	January 13, 2018	407	1.15
Dawn is having a girls night at Mae's while her brothers are having a boys night back at home. She butt-dials Miles while Mae is making fun of him. She gets help from her brothers to delete the voicemail before Miles hears it. When the boys overhear Miles saying he doesn't like Mae's cat, they assume that he's talking about Mae. They call Dawn to tell her about it; but due to a miscommunication, they end up assuming that Miles wants to break up with Mae. Dawn tells Mae about it and Mae decides to break up with Miles first. They later realize it was a misunderstanding. Guest stars: Theodore John Barnes as Miles, Hayden Crawford as Dooley, Ariana Molkara as Sadie, Sidney Floyd as Brooklyn
71	3	"Nicky, Ricky, Dicky & BeyDawncé"	Robbie Countryman	David DiPietro & Paul Ciancarelli	January 20, 2018	402	0.95
Dawn wants to audition for Glee Club but is scared because whenever she auditions, she gets nervous and yodels instead. To help Dawn boost her confidence, her brothers hypnotize her so that she would transform into a confident teenage girl whenever she hears two claps. The next morning, Dawn transforms into a confident mega-star diva, calling herself BeyDawnce. She goes to the glee club to make them beg her to join their club. After being un-hypnotized, Dawn watches her BeyDawnce video and realizes that if BeyDawnce can sing so well with that confidence in front of people, so can she. She re-auditions, this time as herself, and gets into the Glee Club. Guest stars: Theodore John Barnes as Miles, Sidney Floyd as Brooklyn
72	4	"It's a Hard Knocks Life"	Eric Dean Seaton	Andrew Hill Newman	January 27, 2018	403	1.13
Ricky becomes very popular on FaceShack for posting things that happened to his siblings as if they happened to him. Dawn, Dicky and Nicky team up with Mae to take Ricky down by creating an untraceable account called Boco Yolo, which becomes more popular than Ricky's. Ricky becomes suspicious that his siblings are behind the account but he laughs at them because they can't take credit. When Mae shocks everyone by announcing that she's Boco Yolo, Ricky's siblings try to take credit too but it ends in disaster when the other students dare the real Boco Yolo to do the things Boco Yolo claimed he could do. Guest stars: Theodore John Barnes as Miles, Ariana Molkara as Sadie, Sidney Floyd as Brooklyn
73	5	"Sympathy for the Squishy"	Eric Dean Seaton	Steven James Meyer & David L. Moses	February 3, 2018	404	1.08
To avoid getting detention for being late, Nicky lies that Squishy Paws got in a terrible accident. Dicky and Ricky start using the Squishy Paws excuse to get what they want out of sympathy. The Squishy news causes Dawn to lose her solo in Glee Club. However, the principal organizes a special fundraising ceremony for Squishy and asks Dawn to sing. So, the Harpers agree to keep up the lie until after the special ceremony. Instead of Squishy, they bring in a toy dog in full body cast. Everyone is shocked when Anne and Tom show up at the fundraiser carrying the real, healthy Squishy Paws. The quads get punished. Guest stars: Theodore John Barnes as Miles, Ariana Molkara as Sadie, Sidney Floyd as Brooklyn, Miles Elliot as Kipper, Rena Strober as Ms. Tassinari, Rose Abdoo as Principal Sarah Noonan
74	6	"The Harper Quad-Jobbers"	Trevor Kirschner	Michael Feldman	February 17, 2018	406	0.93
The quads want to buy a swimming pool so that their house can become the hangout place for their friends during summer. When the pool they bought online turns out to be too tiny, they start a business to make money by doing various jobs. Their neighbor, Mrs. Monet hires them to take care of her house while she is away. The quads also offer to build Mrs. Monet's shelf since her contractor is allergic to cats. Unfortunately, they fail to follow instructions and the shelf collapses, breaking Mrs. Monet's expensive glasses. They later learn how to make build shelves, earning enough money to buy the pool. Guest stars: Theodore John Barnes as Miles, Isabella Revel as Avery, Hayden Crawford as Dooley, Ariana Molkara as Sadie, Jamie Moyer as Mrs. Monet
75	7	"Leader of the Stack"	Jody Margolin Hahn	Peter Dirksen & Jonathan Howard	June 2, 2018	405	1.00
Guest stars: Theodore John Barnes as Miles, Isabella Revel as Avery, Ariana Molkara as Sadie
76	8	"Quadentity Crisis"	Robbie Countryman	Amy Pittman	June 9, 2018	408	0.79
Each of the quads learns a valuable lesson about being someone they're not: Nicky wants to enter the Colorado Kids Cook-Off to work with his idol, Chef Andre. To convince his teacher, Mr. Wigglesworth, to choose him, Nicky cooks chicken wings that impress him—only to learn that Wigglesworth and Chef Andre are identical twins and that Chef Andre actually tasted them. When Nicky joins the competition with Dawn, who hopes to sing at Chef Andre's restaurant, as his sous chef. However, he becomes attached to the chicken they were assigned to cook and instead prepares a vegetarian dish last-minute. Despite enjoying the meal, Chef Andre disqualifies them for not using meat, but Mr. Wigglesworth praises Nicky’s creativity and growth, revealing his criticism was meant to push him to improve. Meanwhile, Dicky and Ricky try to impress twin sisters by pretending to like each other’s hobbies—poetry and skateboarding—but their lies are exposed, teaching them to be honest about who they are. Guest stars: Paul Vogt as Mr. Wigglesworth, Peter Allen Vogt as Chef Andre, Chiara D'Ambrosio as Abby, Bianca Amore D'Ambrosio as Norah Absent: Kyla-Drew Simmons as Mae
77	9	"Quadbusters"	Brian Stepanek	Nick Rossitto & Patrice Asuncion	June 23, 2018	409	0.82
Guest stars: Ricky Garcia as Zeus, Theodore John Barnes as Miles, Daniella Perkins as Jade, Sean O'Donnell as Elijah
78	10	"Quadcodile Dundee"	Trevor Kirschner	Paul Ciancarelli & David DiPietro	June 30, 2018	411	0.71
When famous basketball player Isaiah Thomas pays a visit to Get Sporty to sign his new shoes, Nicky, Ricky, Dawn and Britt have to wait in line with everyone else to get the signed shoes. But they are too impatient to wait and try everything they can to cut in line and be the first ones to get the signed shoes. Guest stars: Isaiah Thomas as himself, Jonah Hwang as Britt, Theodore John Barnes as Miles, Jaiden Thomas as himself, James Thomas as himself, Hayden Crawford as Dooley, Isabella Revel as Avery Absent: Mace Coronel as Dicky
79	11	"House Crushing for Dummies"	Trevor Kirschner	Jonathan Howard & Peter Dirksen	July 14, 2018	412	0.95
After Nicky and Ricky see Britt video chatting with a girl in Australia named Debra who looks exactly like Dawn, but with a different hair color, they think it is Dawn and start to believe that Britt has developed a crush on her. So they try to break them up to avoid Britt being sent back to Australia. Guest stars: Jonah Hwang as Britt, Theodore John Barnes as Miles, Siena Agudong as Natlee Absent: Mace Coronel as Dicky
80	12	"We'll Always Have Parasites"	Lynn McCracken	Douglas Danger Lieblein	July 28, 2018	410	0.88
Guest stars: Buddy Handleson as Wally, Theodore John Barnes as Miles, Hayden Crawford as Dooley Absent: Mace Coronel as Dicky
81	13	"Quadspiracy Theory"	Siobhan Devine	Natalie Barbrie & Andrew Hill Newman	August 4, 2018	413	0.95
Guest stars: Jonah Hwang as Britt, Theodore John Barnes as Miles, Siena Agudong as Natlee, Lou Ferrigno Jr. as Jett Masterson, Isabella Revel as Avery Absent: Mace Coronel as Dicky
82	14	"Lasties with Firsties"	Michael Feldman	Teleplay by : David L. Moses & Steven James Meyer; Story by : Michael Feldman	August 4, 2018	414	0.84
Guest stars: Theodore John Barnes as Miles, Siena Agudong as Natlee, Isabella Revel as Avery, Mishka Calderon as Amber, Pilot Paisley-Rose as Danielle, Brianna Reed as Marcia Absent: Mace Coronel as Dicky
