= New Kid in Town (disambiguation) =

"New Kid in Town" is a 1976 song by Eagles.

New Kid(s) in Town may also refer to:

- A person who is new to a location or profession; a newbie or newcomer
- "New Kid in Town", a 2010 single by Dani Harmer.
- "New Kid in Town", 1994 season 3, episode 22, number 61 of Rugrats. See List of Rugrats episodes.
- "New Kid in Town", 2004 series 1, episode 1 of Powers.
- "New Kid in Town", 2007 season 1, episode 1 of Cory in the House, see List of Cory in the House episodes
- "New Kids in Town" (Superman: The Animated Series episode), 1998 season 3, episode 3, number 44 of Superman: The Animated Series
- "New Kids in Town" (2010 song), the 2010 debut single of Belgian pop band School Is Cool
- New Kids in Town (1990 film) aka New Killers in Town aka Master of Disaster (Chinese: 初到贵境), a 1990 Hong Kong film starring actress Moon Lee
