= Nicky, Ricky, Dicky & Dawn =

American sitcom

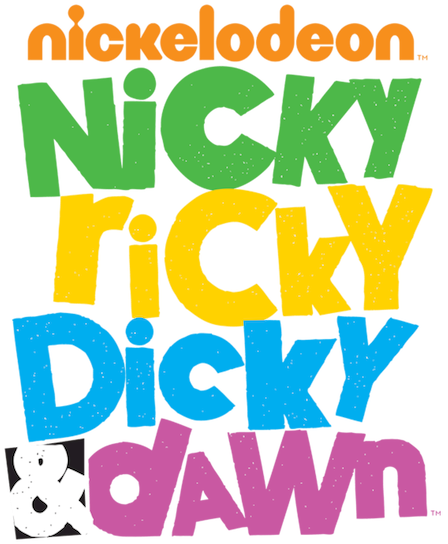
- Genre: Comedy
- Created by: Matt Fleckenstein
- Developed by: Michael Feldman
- Starring: Brian Stepanek; Allison Munn; Aidan Gallagher; Casey Simpson; Mace Coronel; Lizzy Greene; Gabrielle Elyse; Kyla-Drew Simmons
- Theme music composer: Doug Rockwell
- Composers: Chris Lee; Scott Clausen
- Country of origin: United States
- Original language: English
- No. of seasons: 4
- No. of episodes: 82 (list of episodes)

Production
- Executive producers: Michael Feldman; Matt Fleckenstein; Douglas Danger Lieblein; David DiPietro; Paul Ciancarelli
- Producers: Barbara Brace; Andrew Hill Newman; Sarah Jane Cunningham & Suzie V. Freeman
- Cinematography: Patti Lee; John W. Simmons
- Camera setup: Multi-camera
- Running time: 22–23 minutes
- Production company: Nickelodeon Productions

Original release
- Network: Nickelodeon
- Release: September 13, 2014 – August 4, 2018

Nicky, Ricky, Dicky & Dawn is an American comedy television series created by Matt Fleckenstein and developed by Michael Feldman that premiered on Nickelodeon on September 13, 2014. It ran for four seasons and 82 episodes, with the final episode airing on August 4, 2018. The series stars Brian Stepanek, Allison Munn, Aidan Gallagher, Casey Simpson, Mace Coronel, Lizzy Greene, Gabrielle Elyse, and Kyla-Drew Simmons.

== Premise ==
The series focuses on quadruplets Nicky, Ricky, Dicky, and Dawn Harper, nine years old at the start of the series, who have nothing in common and often fight, but must work together to navigate everyday situations.

== Episodes ==
| Season | Episodes | Originally released | |
| Season | Episodes | First released | Last released |
|---|---|---|---|
| 1 | 20 | September 13, 2014 | March 24, 2015 |
| 2 | 25 | May 23, 2015 | August 6, 2016 |
| 3 | 23 | January 7, 2017 | August 5, 2017 |
| 4 | 14 | January 6, 2018 | August 4, 2018 |

== Cast and characters ==
=== Main ===
- Brian Stepanek as Tom, the father of the Harper family quadruplets. It is a running gag in the series that he cares more about his possessions than his children, but he loves his family and is a kid at heart.
- Allison Munn as Anne, the mother of the Harper family quadruplets who usually gets caught up in Tom's new obsessions.
- Aidan Gallagher as Nicky, the youngest of the Harper quadruplets. He is shown to be quite comedic, quirky, and easily confused. He is strong and very fast physically. It is shown that he is a talented chef.
- Casey Simpson as Ricky, the second oldest of the Harper quadruplets. He is the smart one of the group, always seen carrying a book or doing his homework. He is also a neat freak and a bit of a goody two-shoes, though he occasionally tries to prove to Dawn and his brothers that he can bend rules as well.
- Mace Coronel as Dicky, the third oldest and easy-going Harper quadruplet who cares a great deal about his appearance. He is the strongest one of the group, He always takes the easy way out. He ships himself to Australia in "Quadcodile Dundee".
- Lizzy Greene as Dawn, the oldest of the Harper quadruplets. Although she's always seen bothering her brothers, she does care about them deeply. There is a consistent rivalry for the leader spot of the quads between her and Ricky.
- Gabrielle Elyse as Josie (season 1), a worker at Tom's sporting shop and babysitter for Nicky, Ricky, Dicky and Dawn.
- Kyla-Drew Simmons as Mae (recurring, seasons 1–2; main, seasons 3–4), the quads' friend and Dawn's best friend. She often calls herself "the fifth quad".

=== Recurring ===
- Lincoln Melcher as Mack (seasons 1–3)
- Jason Sims-Prewitt as Principal Tarian (seasons 2–3)
- Siena Agudong as Natlee (seasons 2–4)
- Hayden Crawford as Dooley (seasons 3–4)
- Theodore John Barnes as Miles (seasons 3–4)
- Isabella Revel as Avery (seasons 3–4)
- Ariana Molkara as Sadie (season 4)

== Production ==
The series was originally picked up for 13 episodes on March 13, 2014, and was later increased to 20 episodes. The series premiered on September 13, 2014. On November 18, 2014, the series was renewed for a second season. The second season premiered on May 23, 2015. On February 9, 2016, Nickelodeon executives renewed Nicky, Ricky, Dicky & Dawn for a third season of 14 episodes. It was also confirmed that Matt Fleckenstein would step down as show runner. Actress Lizzy Greene announced on her Twitter account that production for season three started on April 26, 2016. The third season premiered on January 7, 2017. The series was renewed for a fourth season and had its episode order for the third season increased from 14 to 24 on March 20, 2017. On October 4, 2017, it was announced that Mace Coronel would be leaving both Nicky, Ricky, Dicky & Dawn, about five episodes before the end of the fourth season, and Nickelodeon. On November 15, 2017, Nickelodeon announced that the fourth season would be the last.

== Reception ==
=== Ratings ===
Viewership and ratings per season of Nicky, Ricky, Dicky & Dawn
| Season | Episodes | First aired | | Last aired | | Avg. viewers (millions) |
| Season | Episodes | Date | Viewers (millions) | Date | Viewers (millions) | Avg. viewers (millions) |
|---|---|---|---|---|---|---|
| 1 | 20 | September 13, 2014 | 1.60 | March 24, 2015 | 1.75 | 1.75 |
| 2 | 25 | May 23, 2015 | 1.11 | August 6, 2016 | 1.31 | 1.46 |
| 3 | 23 | January 7, 2017 | 1.58 | August 5, 2017 | 2.00 | 1.47 |
| 4 | 14 | January 6, 2018 | 1.08 | August 4, 2018 | 0.84 | 0.95 |

=== Awards and nominations ===
| Year | Award | Category | Result | Ref(s) |
|---|---|---|---|---|
| 2015 | Nickelodeon Kids' Choice Awards | Favorite TV Show | Nominated | |
| 2016 | Primetime Emmy Award | Outstanding Cinematography for a Multi-Camera Series (for "Go Hollywood") | Won | |
| 2017 | Nickelodeon Kids' Choice Awards | Favorite TV Show – Kids' Show | Nominated | |
