= Deadtime Stories (film) =

- Theatrical release poster
- Directed by: Jeffrey Delman
- Written by: Jeffrey Delman; J. Edward Kiernan; Charles F. Shelton
- Story by: Jeffrey Delman
- Produced by: William Paul
- Starring: Scott Valentine; Melissa Leo; Catherine De Prume; Anne Redfern; Nicole Picard; Matt Mitler; Kathy Flegg; Phyllis Craig
- Cinematography: Daniel B. Canton
- Edited by: William Szarka
- Music by: Larry Juris
- Production company: Scary Stuff Productions
- Distributed by: Palisades Ent.; Cinema Group; Bedford Entertainment
- Release date: November 26, 1986
- Running time: 83 minutes
- Country: United States
- Language: English
- Box office: $2.7 million

Deadtime Stories (also known internationally as Freaky Fairy-Tales and The Griebels from Deadtime Stories) is a 1986 American horror comedy anthology film co-written and directed by Jeffery Delman in his directorial debut. In the film, a babysitting uncle tells his nephew three stories. The first story involves a slave used by two witches, who are attempting to resurrect their sister. The second story is based on "Little Red Riding Hood", where a teenage girl mistakenly picks up a werewolf's medicine for her grandmother. The third story, based on "Goldilocks", tells about three escaped mental patients who share their hideaway with a murderess.

Production was filmed in New York City in 1984, originally titled as Freaky Fairy Tales. After screening at the 1986 Cannes Film Festival, it was released on November 26, 1986, where it grossed $2.7 million at the box office.

== Plot ==
An impatient uncle attempts to calm his rambunctious nephew by telling him three horror stories. The first story tells about a fisherman's son who is sold as a slave to two witches that are trying to resurrect their sister. The second story is about a teenage girl who picks up the medication for her grandmother, which is mixed up with medicine intended for a werewolf. In the third story, three mental patients escape and share their country house hideaway with a murderess.

== Cast ==
- Scott Valentine as Peter
- Nicole Picard as Rachel
- Matt Mitler as Willie
- Cathryn de Prume as Goldi Lox
- Melissa Leo as Judith "MaMa" Baer
- Kathy Fleig as Miranda
- Phyllis Craig as Hanagohl
- Michael Mesmer as Uncle Mike
- Brian DePersia as Little Brian
- Kevin Hannon as Beresford "Papa" Baer
- Timothy Rule as Wilmont "Baby" Baer
- Anne Redfern as Florinda
- Casper Roos as Vicar
- Barbara Seldon as Seductress
- Leigh Kilton as Seductress
- Lesley Sank as Reviving Magoga
- Lisa Cain as Living Magoga
- Jeffrey Delman as Strangling Man
- Michael Berlinger as Greg
- Fran Lopate as Grandma
- John Bachelder as Drugstore Clerk
- Caroline Carrigan as Nurse
- Oded Carmi as Groundskeeper / Postman
- Heather L. Baley as Girl in Store
- Thea as Dog
- Bob Trimboli as Lt. Jack B. Nimble
- Harvey Pierce as Capt. Jack B. Quick
- Rondell Sheridan as Looney Bin Guard
- Beth Felty as Reporter
- Patrick McCord as Anchor
- Michele Mars as Waitress
- Ron Bush as Bank Guard
- Bryant Tausek as Man in Car
- Suzanna Vaucher as Weather Girl
- Leif Wennestrom as Dead Body
- Jim Nocell as Dead Body
- Evan L. Delman as Police Sergeant

== Production ==
Principal photography was shot as Freaky Fairy Tales in New York City in 1984, and finished post-production in 1985. The title was initially changed to Deadtime, but was settled as Deadtime Stories.

== Release ==
Deadtime Stories was screened at the 1986 Cannes Film Festival. After being acquired, the film was released on November 26, 1986, in the Southeastern United States, and premiered in Los Angeles on February 20, 1987. It earned $708,112 on its opening weekend in 255 theaters, and grossed $2.7 million during its theatrical course.

=== Home video ===
It was originally released on VHS in 1987 by Continental Video and Magnum Entertainment in the United States, and by Entertainment in Video in the United Kingdom where it was titled as Freaky Fairy-Tales. Mill Creek Entertainment released the film on DVD on September 13, 2015 as part of their ‘Chilling Classics: 50 Movie Pack’, but was discontinued after it was mistaken to be in the public domain. The film was released again on DVD by Image Entertainment under license from Cinevision International, which ran 12 minutes shorter. Scream Factory, a substinary of Shout! Factory, released Deadtime Stories on Blu-ray and DVD as a combo pack on February 28, 2017.
