= Cory in the House =

American television series

- Created by: Dennis Rinsler; Marc Warren
- Based on: That's So Raven by Michael Poryes and Susan Sherman
- Starring: Kyle Massey; Jason Dolley; Maiara Walsh; Madison Pettis; John D'Aquino; Rondell Sheridan
- Theme music composer: Matthew Gerrard & Robbie Nevil
- Opening theme: "Cory in the House", performed by Kyle Massey and Maiara Walsh
- Composers: Chris Alan Lee & Scott Clausen
- Country of origin: United States
- Original language: English
- No. of seasons: 2
- No. of episodes: 34 (list of episodes)

Production
- Executive producers: Dennis Rinsler; Marc Warren
- Production locations: Hollywood Center Studios; Hollywood, California
- Camera setup: Videotape; Multi-camera
- Running time: 22 minutes (approx.)
- Production companies: It's a Laugh Productions; Warren & Rinsler Productions

Original release
- Network: Disney Channel
- Release: January 12, 2007 – September 12, 2008

Related
- That's So Raven (2003–2007)

Cory in the House is an American television sitcom which aired on the Disney Channel from January 12, 2007, to September 12, 2008, and was a spin-off from the Disney Channel series That's So Raven (2003–2007). The show focuses on Cory Baxter, who moves from San Francisco, California, to Washington, D.C. with his father, Victor Baxter, who gets a new job as the White House executive chef. The series was the first Disney Channel spin-off series, as well as the final Disney Channel series overall to be both shot and broadcast in standard definition for the entire run of the show. Reruns of the series have aired on Disney Channel and Disney XD, and on the Family Channel in Canada. Raven-Symoné guest-starred in one episode, reprising her role as Raven Baxter.

== Episodes ==
Season	Episodes	Originally released	
Season	Episodes	First released	Last released
1	21	January 12, 2007	September 21, 2007
2	13	November 17, 2007	September 12, 2008

== Characters ==
The main characters of Cory in the House (from left to right), Samantha Samuels, Sophie Martinez, President Richard Martinez, Cory Baxter, Victor Baxter, Meena Paroom and Newt Livingston.

=== Main ===
- Cory Baxter (Kyle Massey) is the protagonist of the series. He is the son of Victor and Tanya Baxter. A teenager, Cory is friends with Newt Livingston and his crush Meena Paroom. Cory is often irritated with the President's daughter Sophie Martinez, because of her two-facedness, and also with Candy Smiles, who keeps calling him "C-Bear". He usually looks to his father for advice. Cory occasionally cooks up various "get-rich-quick" schemes, all of which end badly. He plays in the band DC3, founded by Newt, Cory, and Meena, as the Drummer. His catchphrases in this series are "Coming, daddy!", "You know how I do", "Dang!" and "Daddy no!". Cory is similar to his big sister Raven (from That's So Raven), and they both are always getting into some crazy situation, but in the end they find a way out of it. When he was much younger, he played the same role in That's So Raven, though there is a notable difference in portrayal, as younger Cory was introduced as a minor annoyance and villain, while on his own show Cory is much more like his older sister. He will do anything in order to get money. In some episodes, in a humorous climax, Cory's trousers would fall, revealing his underwear, usually with dollar signs on them.
- Newton "Newt" Livingston III (Jason Dolley) is the son of a senator and the Chief Justice. He is the best friend of Meena Paroom and Cory Baxter. He is a bit clueless, and he loves rock and roll. He has some similar characteristics to Raven's friend Chelsea Daniels (from That's So Raven). He tends to say, "Awesome!" during situations that are not particularly exciting. For example, when the school students were getting flu shots. He has trouble understanding obvious things, yet he has the knowledge to solve confusing things. He plays the guitar (his favorite being a Squier Stratocaster), and is part of DC3. He also knows about Cory's crush on Meena. He wears jeans and chains whenever he is not in any particular costume. Sophie once had a crush on him. He also hates the idea of running for student body president, as he does not think he will make a good leader, and because it would throw off his carefree lifestyle, despite his parents wanting him to. Newt has been forced (though he enjoys it) to make up excuses for his parents as to why he can not run for student body president, naming the day of the year he makes them up "Excuse Day". His guitar is a Cherry Flaming Red Fender that is tuned for rock 'n roll.
- Meena Paroom (Maiara Walsh) is the daughter of the ambassador of Bahavia, a fictional country very similar to Bolivia, containing cultural elements of India, Turkmenistan, Uzbekistan, Tajikistan, Kyrgyzstan, and Pakistan. She likes to wear American clothing and to listen to rock music, which her father frowns upon. Jason Stickler, the son of the head of the CIA, is obsessed with her to the point of spying on her constantly. Meena's father is very disapproving of Cory and Newt. In "Ain't Miss Bahavian" he once banned her from being near them because he believed that they had hypnotized her to disrespect their country. Her father later decided to let them still be friends after Meena came clean about the secrets she had been keeping. It is obvious that Cory has a crush on her and believes that she will like him back if he does nice things for her; however, Meena does not return Cory's feelings. She has two different crushes during the series named Craig Berkowitz and Nanoosh. Meena is similar to Eddie (from That's So Raven). They both have a love for music, and are the only ones of their gender in their group of three. According to Maiara Walsh, her Bahavian accent is a mix of Brazilian Portuguese and Arabic.
- Sophia "Sophie" Martinez (Madison Pettis) is the daughter of President Richard Martinez. She is a mischievous girl who loves to annoy people, especially Cory. She has two best friends, Haley and Tanisha, who often compete with Sophie at random things, like class president. She is also known as "America's Angel" by all of America (though she is not one to Cory), and when her nickname is mentioned, she often responds using her catchphrase, "That's what they call me!"
- President Richard Martinez (John D'Aquino) is the President of the United States and Sophie's father. He often gives Cory advice and mentorship in fond and submissive ways. He often speaks his catchphrase by looking in the camera (thus breaking the fourth wall) and saying, "The President of the United States". He also tries to be funny and tells jokes that are often humorless, like in the episode "A Rat By Any Other Name" and in the episode "Nappers Delight". He often counts on his assistant, Samantha Samuels, in some cases, like in the episode "Just Desserts" and the episode "I Ain't Got Rhythm". His actions as president are very serious, although sometimes he may exhibit some childish behavior. He usually enters the scene whistling "Hail to the Chief". President Martinez also appears in Hannah Montana in the episode "Take this Job and Love It". In the season 4 Hannah Montana episode "Hannah Montana to the Principal's Office," a new president visits Hannah Montana, implying that the president had left office before July 18, 2010 (the date of the episode).
- Victor Baxter (Rondell Sheridan) is the personal chef of the president in the White House. He is Cory and Raven Baxter's father, and husband of Tanya Baxter. He often resolves conflicts between other characters, although he often conflicts with Samantha Samuels. A running gag is that he often embarrasses himself by misinterpreting what people say to him. He also often says "I'll go pack..." when Cory gets in trouble, and another of his catchphrases is "Here comes the pain...". He is the rival of Leonard Stevenson.

=== Recurring ===
- Jason Stickler (Jake Thomas), nicknamed "Stickman" by himself, attends Washington Prep with the characters and is the rival of Cory Baxter. He is also a classmate of Cory, Newt and Meena's, and has proved to be their enemy. Stickler has a crush on Meena and often disguises himself. He often challenges Cory in humiliating ways to win her heart, even though it is obvious that Meena has no feelings for him. The son of the head of the CIA, he is equipped with all of the latest CIA technology. Jason often uses the CIA devices to his own benefit, although his plans usually go wrong. He is also sometimes seen with a 1980s-style haircut and is very proficient with the keyboard.
- Samantha Samuels (Lisa Arch) is President Richard Martinez's Personal Assistant. She is very strict and likes things fit to the President's needs. She hates Cory's schemes in which he tries to make money, which end up involving the President. Chef Victor affectionately describes Samantha as "overly stressed". She likes bird calls, and can do them better than the President. Samantha does however have a soft side which she showed to Sophie during her slumber party in "I Ain't Got No Rhythm" as it was her first slumber party and she was ecstatic. Sophie sometimes assigns her to do her homework. It is revealed in "The Presidential Seal" that Samantha has heterochromia, when she said that she only had one gray eye.
- Candy Smiles (Jordan Puryear) is a girl who attends Washington Prep and has a 4.0 Grade Point Average. She hates the lack of pep in the school in the "Smell of School Spirit". She went out with Cory a couple of times and in "We Don't Have Chemistry" they share a kiss. She is also best friends with Meena and has a black belt in karate revealed in We Have No Chemistry. She also tutored Cory in Chemistry because he was about to go to summer school. She went out with a guy named Juan Carlos making Cory jealous in "Macho Libre". She has also been to Mexico and likes Mexican things. She also knows where a certain pressure point is on the body, and whenever she is angry at Cory, she'll use it on him.
- Ms. Flowers (Lori Alan) is Sophie's fourth-grade teacher. She also teaches Tanisha and Haley, who sit at the front of her classroom. Her lessons are often about random things, such as penguins and tumbleweeds. She is a good friend of President Martinez but tries not to let this affect how she teaches Sophie. She is very friendly but is a hard grader and always gives Sophie grades of B−, even when Samantha does Sophie's homework for her. Ms. Flowers tends to tell her students too much about her personal life, on one occasion mentioning that her online dates never call her back.
- Tanisha (Zolee Griggs) is a bratty, spoiled 4th grader who is one of Sophie's classmates. As claimed by Sophie, she is the most popular girl in her class. She is one of the Sunshine Girls with Sophie. Tanisha cheated her way to being class president by fake crying.
- Haley (Brianne Tju) is one of Sophie's best friends, and somewhat high-strung. She is terrified of school or any kind of work. Haley is a Sunshine Girl, like Tanisha and Sophie, and was part of Sophie's singing group "The Pink Cupcakes" along with Tanisha.

=== Guest stars ===
- Raven-Symoné as Raven Baxter
- Dwayne "The Rock" Johnson as Himself
- Don Stark as Prime Minister Vladimir Schozoff
- George Takei as Ronald
- Josie Loren as Jessica
- Lupe Ontiveros as Mama Martinez
- Christa B. Allen as Cheyenne
- Bobb'e J. Thompson as Stanley
- Fred Stoller as Norman Trumbles
- Michael Steger as Juan Carlos
- Bailee Madison as Maya
- Mary Chris Wall as Professor Bushwick
- Kate Micucci as Becky
- Lee Reherman as Slade
- Tanya Chisholm as Nicole

== Production ==
After the completion of That's So Raven, propositions were made for a spin-off including That's So Raven Too! which was accompanied by a soundtrack of the same name, and would have been about Raven going off to college. Raven-Symoné was offered the spin-off, but she declined it, therefore Disney Channel decided to give it to Kyle Massey. Raven-Symoné would later return for the Raven's Home spin-off in 2017.

The first episode aired on Disney Channel on January 12, 2007, as a sneak peek. The show was created and produced by Dennis Rinsler and Marc Warren, who previously produced That's So Raven and Even Stevens, another Disney Channel show. Filming for Cory in the House began on July 18, 2006, and concluded on November 7, 2007, at Hollywood Center Studios (where The Suite Life of Zack & Cody and That's So Raven were filmed) and used a studio audience in most scenes.

Similar to Hannah Montana, many of the episode titles are parodies of popular songs. For example, "We Built This Kitty on Rock and Roll" comes from "We Built This City", "Mall of Confusion" from "Ball of Confusion", "Smells Like School Spirit" from "Smells Like Teen Spirit", and "Ain't Miss Bahavian" from "Ain't Misbehavin'".

=== Theme song and opening sequence ===
The theme song to Cory in the House was written and produced by Matthew Gerrard and Robbie Nevil, and performed by Kyle Massey, Maiara Walsh, and Jason Dolley (though the closing credits of the show credit the performance of the theme song only to Massey). An alternate theme song, "Rollin' to D.C.", is also sung by Massey and Walsh and was used in the music video to promote the series.

=== Filming and cancellation ===
The show was intended to have a three-season run. But while filming a season two episode, where Cory goes overboard on a large boat, an incident occurred. Since the boat was rented, the production wasn't able to alter the boat like they normally would by cutting a hole in the side. According to Marc Warren, "the plan was for Kyle to say his lines at the edge of the boat, then a stunt person would step in to leap off the side of the boat, and drop onto a stack of thick padded mats below. Instead, Kyle jumped over the edge of the boat himself. Kyle thought it would be really funny if he did the fall." He went on to say, "So we yell cut, [Massey] says, "I'm doing it," and he falls off the boat." Production designer Jerry Dunn, and that episode's director Eric Dean Seaton, both recalled that Kyle had permission to do the jump himself.

Massey, who at the time was 16-years old, hit the mat at an angle, rolled off, and smacked his head on the concrete soundstage floor. He was rushed to the hospital, being trailed by concerned members of the crew. Once medically cleared, Massey returned to film additional episodes for the season. After the accident, the 2007–08 Writers Guild of America strike started and the show went on hiatus, and never returned. In 2010, the Massey family sued the production company and a number of people involved, and alleged Kyle suffered ongoing physical and mental pain for years after the fall. The case was dismissed before any proceedings. "The show kind of just fizzled out on a bad note between the accident, the threat of the lawsuit, the writers strike," Dennis Rinsler said. "When it came time to settle the strike, and get back to work, the network said to us, "no more, we're done," and Cory was canceled."

== Broadcast ==
The series originally aired from January 12, 2007, to September 12, 2008, on Disney Channel. The show returned to Disney Channel on September 24, 2014, as part of Disney Replay. It premiered on the same date on Family Channel and on June 1, 2011, on Disney XD (Canada). In the United Kingdom and Ireland it premiered on January 28, 2007, on Disney Channel and on September 5, 2009, on Disney XD. It premiered on February 2, 2007, on Disney Channel (Australia and New Zealand), on April 27, 2007, on Disney Channel (Southeast Asia), and on June 9, 2007, on Disney Channel (India). The show was initially planned to be added to the ABC Kids lineup in the fall of 2007, but it was scrapped later on.

== Home media ==
DVD Name	Release date	Episode(s) featured	Special features
All-Star Edition	August 7, 2007 (US)	"Air Force One Too Many"; "Just Desserts"; "Never the Dwayne Shall Meet"; "That's So in the House"	Raven in the House – Behind the scenes of "That's So in the House"; Rock in the House – Behind the scenes of "Never the Dwayne Shall Meet"
Wish Gone Amiss	November 27, 2007 (US) September 1, 2008 (UK)	"Gone Wishin'" (Cory in the House); "Super Twins" (The Suite Life of Zack & Cody); "When You Wish You Were the Star" (Hannah Montana)	"I Wish I May, I Wish I Might: A Guide to Making Wishes" hosted by Jason Earles of Hannah Montana.
Newt and Improved	May 27, 2008 (US)	"The Presidential Seal"; "Through the Roof"; "Peace, Love, and Misunderstanding"; "Lip Service"	Breaking Down – Get the inside scoop on how an episode is made from start to finish

== Video game ==
A video game based on the television series was released for the Nintendo DS in 2008. In January 2026, a surge of positive ratings driven by renewed interest in memes related to the show caused it to become the second-highest-rated video game on Metacritic by user score.
