= Sarah Jane Cunningham and Suzie V. Freeman =

American television producers and writers

Sarah Jane Cunningham
- Born: Sarah Jane Cunningham; July 18, 1967 (age 59); London, England
- Occupations: Television producer, television writer
- Years active: 2000–present

Suzie V. Freeman
- Born: Suzanne Chantal Villandry; August 27, 1969 (age 56); Sarasota, Florida U.S.
- Occupations: Television producer, television writer
- Years active: 1999–present

Sarah Jane Cunningham and Suzie Villandry-Freeman are an American television producing and writing team. They began their careers writing for the Nickelodeon animated series The Wild Thornberrys. Before moving on to the fellow Nicktoons shows Rugrats and As Told by Ginger. Some of their other television credits include Even Stevens, Cory in the House, South of Nowhere, Everybody Hates Chris, True Jackson, VP, Melissa & Joey and That's So Raven. They were nominated for a Primetime Emmy Award for their work on the latter series.

== Credits ==
- Friends (1999, writer, 1 episode) (Freeman only)
- The Wild Thornberrys (2000, writers)
- Rugrats (2001, writers)
- As Told by Ginger (2001, writers)
- Even Stevens (2000–2003, producers and writers)
- Family Affair (2002–2003, writers, 3 episodes)
- That's So Raven (2003–2005, producers and writers, 6 episodes)
- Less Than Perfect (2005, writers, 1 episode)
- South of Nowhere (2007, writers, 1 episode)
- Cory in the House, (2007–2008, 2 episodes)
- Everybody Hates Chris (2009, 1 episode)
- The Assistants (2009, 2 episodes)
- True Jackson, VP (2009–2010, writers, 6 episodes)
- Melissa & Joey (2011–2013, producers and writers)
- Last Man Standing (2012–2013, writers, 2 episodes, producers)
- I Didn't Do It (2014, writers, 3 episodes, producers)
- Nicky, Ricky, Dicky & Dawn (2014–2016, writers, 3 episodes, co-executive producers)
- School of Rock (2016–2018, writers, 4 episodes, co-executive producers)
- Wayne (2018, writers, 1 episode, co-executive producers)
- Punky Brewster (2021, writers, 2 episodes, co-executive producers)
- iCarly (2021, writers, 1 episode, co-executive producers)
