= Rondell Sheridan =

American actor and comedian

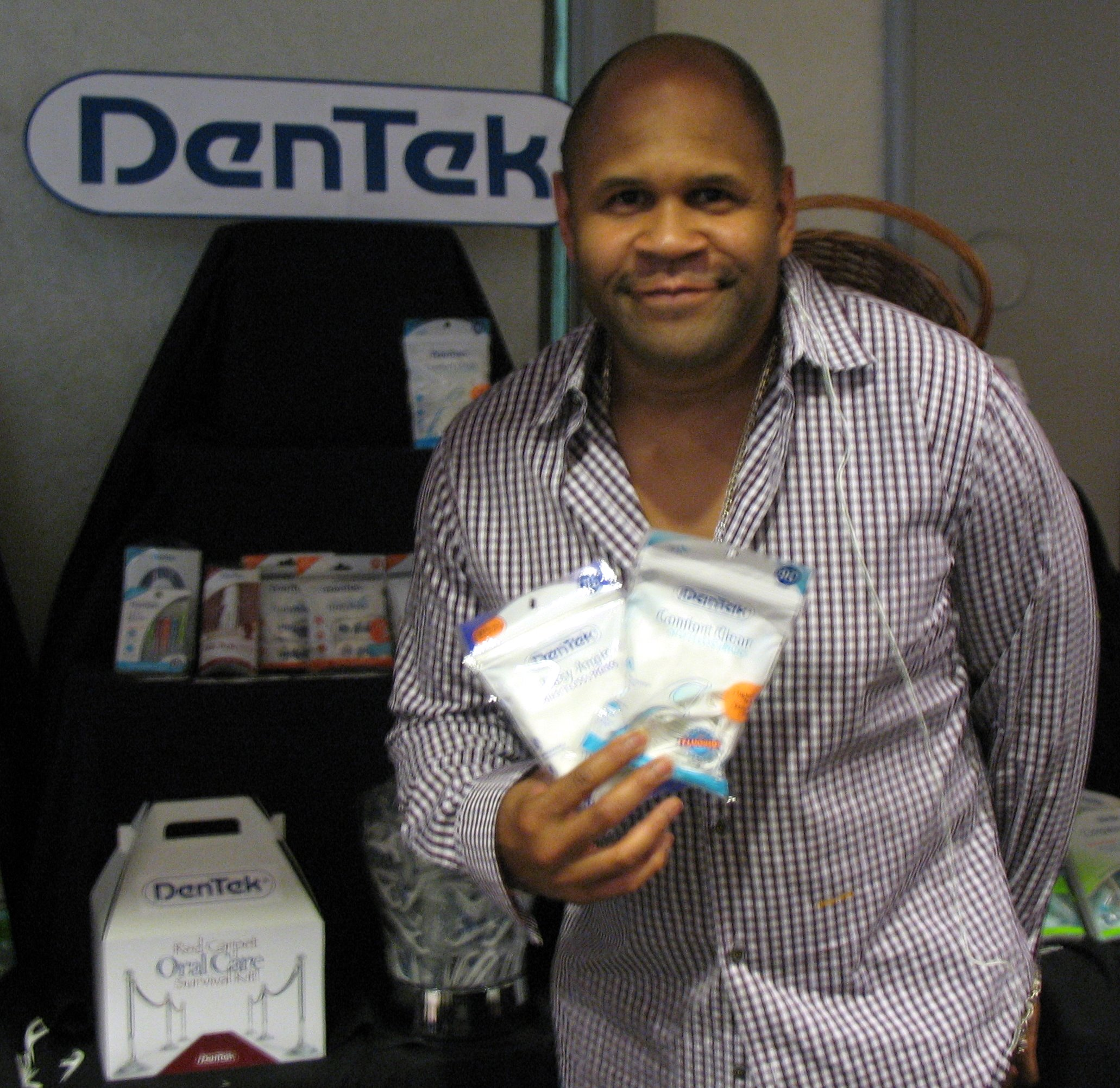
- Sheridan in September 2008
- Born: Rondell Jerome Sheridan; August 15, 1958 (age 68); Chicago, Illinois, U.S.
- Occupations: Actor; comedian; director
- Years active: 1983–present
- Website: www.rondellsheridan.com

Rondell Jerome Sheridan (born August 15, 1958) is an American actor, comedian and television director, best known for his role of Victor Baxter in the Disney Channel sitcom That's So Raven, as well as its later spin-offs Cory in the House and Raven's Home. Sheridan is an alumnus of Marquette University. Sheridan also starred as Dr. Ron Aimes on the NBC/UPN sitcom Minor Adjustments.

== Early life ==
Sheridan was born on August 15, 1958 in Chicago, Illinois, raised in its South Side. He matriculated at Marquette University in Milwaukee, Wisconsin, where Sheridan studied interpersonal communications while minoring in advertising. He graduated from Marquette in 1980. Sheridan received his acting training at Circle in the Square Theatre School.

== Career ==
Sheridan focused on his career as a stand-up comedian during the 1980s. His style has been described as observational in nature. He performed on talk shows The Tonight Show Starring Johnny Carson and Late Night with Conan O'Brien. Sheridan has cited George Carlin, Bill Cosby and Richard Pryor among his comic influences, stating he views them as "comedic storytellers" who inspired his own approach to stand up.

In one of Sheridan's earliest acting roles, he portrayed a guard at a mental hospital in horror film Deadtime Stories (1986). He played the lead role of Dr. Ron Aimes, a child psychologist, on the sitcom Minor Adjustments (1995−96). The series originally debuted at NBC, but switched to the fledgling UPN network in the middle of the season after NBC cancelled it. The run on UPN did not fare any better, and the show ended that season.

Following Minor Adjustments, Sheridan made numerous guest appearances on television, including on CBS drama Touched by an Angel and as a police officer in the Nickelodeon series Kenan & Kel. He appeared as patriarch Andre Walker on the sitcom Cousin Skeeter from 1998 to 2001.

Sheridan landed the role of Victor Baxter, a chef and the father of Raven Baxter, on the Disney Channel series That's So Raven (2003−07). After That's So Raven ended, Sheridan continued to play Victor in the spin-off Cory in the House, which ran from 2007 to 2008. He returned as Victor Baxter on Raven's Home, a continuation of That's So Raven, as a guest star in season 2. Sheridan joined the main cast three seasons later in 2022, after Victor suffers a heart attack and Raven helps him recuperate. Sheridan is therefore the only person to have been a part of the main cast of all three shows in the That's So Raven franchise.

In addition to acting, Sheridan has also worked as a director, helming several episodes of That's So Raven and Cory in the House. Since the late 2000s, he has directed a number of short films, including Nowhere Cafe (2016).

== Personal life ==
In April 2025, Sheridan was diagnosed with severe pancreatitis.

== Filmography ==
=== Films ===
Year	Film	Role	Notes
1983	The First Turn-On!	Gang Member Rondell	
1986	Deadtime Stories	Looney Bin Guard	
1999	Rites of Passage	Trooper Dixon	
2006	Raise Your Voice	Creepy Head Teacher	
2009	If It Ain't Broke, Break It!	Lou, Cafe Owner	
2009	Hollywood Housesitter	Director	Short
2011	Last Day of School	Director	Short
2011	Wiz's World	Director and writer	Short
2011	Hollywood Halloween	Director and writer	Written segments "Let the Sunshine," "Quiet Zoms," and "The Other Side"
2012	Wordplay	Director	Short
2012	What I Did Last Summer	Director and editor	Short
2013	Super Impossible Squad	Director and writer	Short
2013	Second Chances	Director	Short
2014	Another Assembly	Director	
2016	Nowhere Cafe	Director	Short
2017	Cattle Call	Director	Short

=== Television ===
Year	Film	Role	Notes
1987	Stand Up America	Himself	
1990	The Tonight Show Starring Johnny Carson	Performing in His Tonight Show Debut	Season 28 episode 153, 4-May-1990
1992	A Different World	South Central Looter #1	Episode: "Honeymoon in L.A.: Part 2"
1994	Comedy: Coast to Coast	Himself	
1995	Brotherly Love	Dr. Ron Aimes	Episode: "Witchcraft" (uncredited)
1995–1996	Minor Adjustments	Dr. Ron Aimes	Main role, also creator
1996	Lounge Lizards	Himself	
1997	The Jamie Foxx Show	Dr. Gilbert	Episode: "Too Much Soul Food"
1997	Match Game	Himself	Unaired pilot, panelist
1998	Touched by an Angel	Harvey	Episode: "Only Connect"
1998	Kenan & Kel	Officer McWiggins	Episode: "Attack of the Bugman"
1998–1999	Figure It Out	Himself	Panelist
1998–2001	Cousin Skeeter	Andre Walker	Main role
1998–2001	Show Me the Funny	Himself / The Host	
2001	Men Are from Mars, Women Are from Venus	Himself / The Host	
2001	The Test	Himself	Episode: "The Nosey Test", panelist
2001	Rendez-View	Himself	Guest host
2003–2004	Hollywood Squares	Himself	Panelist, 10 episodes
2003–2006	That's So Raven	Victor Baxter / Frederick Douglass	Main role, also directed 3 episodes
2004	That's Funny!	Himself / The Host	
2004	That's So Raven: Supernaturally Stylish	Victor Baxter	Video (archived footage)
2005	Just for Laughs	Himself	Episode: April 10, 2005
2006	That's So Raven: Raven's Makeover Madness	Victor Baxter	Video (archived footage)
2006	Life of Pryor: The Richard Pryor Story	Himself	Documentary
2006	Bring That Year Back 2006: Laugh Now, Cry Later	Himself / The Host	
2006	New Year Sing-A-Long Bowl-A-Thon!	Himself / The Host	
2007	That's So Suite Life of Hannah Montana	Victor Baxter	Video (archived footage)
2007	Cory in the House: All Star Edition	Victor Baxter	Video (archived footage)
2007	Wish Gone Amiss	Victor Baxter	Video (archived footage)
2007–2008	Cory in the House	Victor Baxter	Main role, also directed 5 episodes
2008	Cory in the House: Newt & Improved Edition	Victor Baxter	Video (archived footage)
2008	Hannah Montana	The Director	Episode: "Joannie B. Goode"
2011	Comedy.TV	Himself	
2012	The Jadagrace Show	"Big Daddy Slim"	Episode: "A Tiger's Tale: Part 1"
2012	Finding the Funny	Himself	Documentary
2018, 2022–2023	Raven's Home	Victor Baxter	Guest star (season 2), main role (seasons 5–6); also directed 2 episodes

=== Music video ===
- 1985 "Part-Time Lover" - Stevie Wonder

Was in the music video for the Sesame Street song Danger Danger
