= That's So Raven season 3 =

That's So Raven
- Season 3
- Starring: Raven; Orlando Brown; Kyle Massey; Anneliese van der Pol; T'Keyah Crystal Keymáh; Rondell Sheridan
- No. of episodes: 35

Release
- Original network: Disney Channel
- Original release: October 1, 2004 – January 16, 2006

Season chronology
- ← Previous; Season 2 Next → Season 4

The third season of That's So Raven aired on Disney Channel from October 1, 2004 to January 16, 2006. The season deals with the Baxter family, Raven (Raven-Symoné), Cory (Kyle Massey), Tanya (T'Keyah Crystal Keymáh) and Victor Baxter (Rondell Sheridan) as they continue to manage with Raven and her ability to see into the future. Orlando Brown and Anneliese van der Pol co-stars as Raven's best friends, Eddie Thomas and Chelsea Daniels.

The episode "Too Much Pressure," which aired on June 17, 2005, broke Disney Channel records by being the 66th episode of the series, the first to break the 65-episode contract. That's So Raven was officially called the network's highest-rated series during its third year run.

Guest stars for this season included: Rose Abdoo, James Avery, Yvette Nicole Brown, Mary Jo Catlett, Caitlin Crosby, Kathie Lee Gifford, Juliette Goglia, Allie Grant, Macy Gray, Mary Gross, Jackée Harry, David Henrie, Claudia Jordan, Cyndi Lauper, Cody Linley, Susan Lucci, Christopher Massey, Jonathan McDaniel, Taylor Negron, Della Reese, Erica Rivera, Giovonnie Samuels, Skyler Samuels, Drew Sidora, Mindy Sterling, Alyson Stoner, Bobb'e J. Thompson, Ricky Ullman, Travis Van Winkle, Rheagan Wallace, Tiffany Haddish, Louise Martin Braga III and Kym Whitley.

This is the final season to feature T'Keyah Crystal Keymáh as Tanya Baxter.

This is the last season produced by Brookwell McNamara Entertainment.

== Cast ==
- Raven-Symoné as Raven Baxter
- Orlando Brown as Eddie Thomas
- Kyle Massey as Cory Baxter
- Anneliese van der Pol as Chelsea Daniels
- T'Keyah Crystal Keymáh as Tanya Baxter
- Rondell Sheridan as Victor Baxter

== Production staff ==
Season 3 Production Staff
| Staffer | Title | Notes |
| Sean McNamara | executive producer | |
| David Brookwell | executive producer | |
| Sean McNamara | executive producer | |
| Marc Warren | executive producer | |
| Dava Savel | co-executive producer | episodes 1–30 |
| Dennis Rinsler | executive producer | |
| Michael Carrington | co-executive producer | |
| Michael Feldman | supervising producer | |
| Tom Burkhard | consulting producer | episodes 30–35 |
| Al Sonja Rice | consulting producer | episodes 30–35 |
| Sarah Jane Cunningham and Suzie V. Freeman | producers | episodes 1–30 |
| Patty Gary-Cox | producer | |

== Episodes ==
- This season consists of 35 episodes.

That's So Raven Season 3 episodes
| No. overall | No. in season | Title | Directed by | Written by | Original release date | Prod. code | U.S. viewers (millions) |
|---|---|---|---|---|---|---|---|
| 44 | 1 | "Psychic Eye for the Sloppy Guy" | Rich Correll | Marc Warren | October 1, 2004 | 301 | N/A |
Raven, Chelsea, and Eddie give a student at school named Tyler a makeover. Tyler likes Raven, but he is not Raven's type, so she tells him that she just wants to be friends. After the makeover, Tyler turns out to be really handsome, so she wants him back. But he's already dating someone else. This causes Raven to disguise herself as a belly-dancer and – unsuccessfully – try to break them up at a restaurant. Guest stars: Drew Sidora as Chantel, Nazanin Mandi as Vicky, Julian Jackson as Tyler
| 45 | 2 | "Stark Raven Mad" | Marc Warren | Sarah Jane Cunningham & Suzie V. Freeman | October 22, 2004 | 304 | N/A |
Raven tries to deal with her annoying new neighbor, Sierra, as well as getting close to her science partner, Jalen. Meanwhile, Eddie and Chelsea do their project on the effects of not sleeping for 48 hours – with unwilling partners Tanya and Victor. Guest stars: Juliette Goglia as Sierra, Charles Duckworth as Jalen, Johari Johnson as Anita Note: The set used for the museum seems to be the Tipton Hotel set from The Suite Life of Zack & Cody.
| 46 | 3 | "Opportunity Shocks" | Rich Correll | Dava Savel | November 5, 2004 | 309 | N/A |
Raven, Cory, and Victor try to sell a business entrepreneur his next venture. However, Raven is constantly interrupted by an annoying seven-year-old named Stanley. She tries to set him up with Sierra, but Stanley rejects her, preferring Raven. Guest stars: Juliette Goglia as Sierra, Bobb'e J. Thompson as Stanley, James Avery as Presto Jones Absent: T'Keyah Crystal Keymáh as Tanya Baxter
| 47 | 4 | "Taken to the Cleaners" | Rich Correll | Michael Feldman | November 19, 2004 | 313 | N/A |
Raven and Chelsea's plans for an all-day movie marathon are ruined when Eddie has to bring his annoying neighbor, Stanley, with him, and when Raven is waylaid by chores. One such chore is making sure Tanya's law professor receives Tanya’s latest assignment when he drops by the house while Tanya is absent. Distracted by the movie marathon, Raven gives the law professor the wrong envelope, one containing an angry letter Tanya wrote to vent her feelings against him. Meanwhile, Cory, Victor, and Eddie lose all their valuables to Stanley in successive games of ping-pong. Chelsea then decides to play him for all their stuff back – a fatal mistake on Stanley's part, as Chelsea is a champion ping-pong player! Special guest star: Macy Gray as Rhonda Guest stars: Bobb'e J. Thompson as Stanley, Jim Doughan as Professor Benjamin
| 48 | 5 | "Five Finger Discount" | Rich Correll | Dennis Rinsler | December 3, 2004 | 302 | N/A |
Cory gets sucked into a world of peer pressure after his friends encourage him to shoplift at a toy store. His guilt causes him to have nightmares. Raven has a vision of Cory getting stopped by a security guard for shoplifting again, and tries to prevent it – but, as usual, she must disguise herself – as a security guard – making the vision come true! In disguise, Raven is able to tell the real security guard that the other boys have been shoplifting, and Cory leaves his "friends". Meanwhile, Raven; Chelsea; and Eddie win a "mystery prize" in a soda-can contest. The audience never discovers what this prize is, but clues are dropped, ending in the prize getting ruined – right before the audience sees it. Clues are: that Chelsea says "Our prize isn't allowed in the mall!", and Eddie saying "This one is!". Another one is Raven telling Eddie and Chelsea not to get it wet. Although never blatantly stated, "the prize" is most suggested to be a mechanical pet. Guest stars: Cody Linley as Daryl, Christopher Massey as Jeremy, Marilyn Sue Perry as Watson
| 49 | 6 | "Sweeps" | Sean McNamara | Dennis Rinsler | December 11, 2004 | 311 | N/A |
The community gets ready for their annual play, and everything goes well -- until Raven has a vision of the audience jeering the play. Raven decides to take charge of all aspects of the play, thus becoming overly bossy and arrogant. This drives everyone else to quit. Now, Raven must put on the show -- by herself! Guest stars: Frankie Ryan Manriquez as William, Rance Howard as Murphy, Laivan Greene as Girl Sweepie, Ben Ratskoff as Boy Sweepie
| 50 | 7 | "Double Vision" | T'Keyah Crystal Keymáh | Sarah Jane Cunningham & Suzie V. Freeman | December 17, 2004 | 318 | N/A |
The school is preparing for a concert by a folk singer, Rayne Bow, whom Chelsea admires. Meanwhile, Raven tries to keep her distance from Ben (Travis Van Winkle), a boy whom Chelsea likes. While doing so, she has a vision of another student getting into a freak accident—and to her surprise, Ben has the same vision. The two realize that they are both psychic, but Ben has not told his family or friends about his "gift". Raven tries to persuade him to be honest. Ben hugs Raven because he's relieved to have confided in her, leading Chelsea to think that Raven and Ben are dating. However, Ben and Raven realized when they hugged they both saw a vision of the same thing. Later in the episode, Rayne Bow is late to her concert, locked in a closet with Eddie. Ben and Raven must kiss in order to see where the two are trapped. Meanwhile, Cory and Cindy become boyfriend and girlfriend. Cindy says it's not official until they kiss. But Cory is uncomfortable about that and says we don't have to do what we don't want to do, and Cindy agrees too. Guest stars: Travis Van Winkle as Ben, Caitlin Crosby as Rayne Bow, Jordyn Colemon as Cindy Absent: T'Keyah Crystal Keymáh as Tanya Baxter
| 51 | 8 | "Bend It Like Baxter" | Rich Correll | Dava Savel | January 7, 2005 | 315 | N/A |
Natasha, a Russian exchange student and gymnast who resembles Raven, comes to the school. Eric, an athletic boy Raven really likes, mistakes Raven for Natasha, leading Raven to pretend to be Natasha in an attempt to win him over. At the gymnastics meet, which is scheduled for the next day, Eric thinks Raven's entering. Raven is relieved, thinking the real Natasha can take her place, but—unfortunately—Natasha sprains her ankle, leaving Raven to fill in for Natasha’s floor exercise. Guest stars: Mary Jo Catlett as Mrs. Applebaum, Natascha Hopkins as Natasha, Jordyn Colemon as Cindy, Chancellor Miller as Jerry, Jayleen Moore as Eric Absent: T'Keyah Crystal Keymáh as Tanya Baxter
| 52 | 9 | "The Big Buzz" | Eric Dean Seaton | Marc Warren | January 28, 2005 | 322 | N/A |
Raven desperately strives to win "Best Dressed" at school, and she helps a shy guidance counselor, who lacks self-confidence. However, the school counselor (Susan Lucci) ends up upstaging her. Special guest star: Susan Lucci as Ms. Romano Guest stars: Rose Abdoo as Señorita Rodriguez, Jessica Karen Szhor as Jordache Hilltopper Note: By production number, this is the final episode produced to feature T'Keyah Crystal Keymáh as Tanya Baxter.
| 53 | 10 | "True Colors" | Christopher B. Pearman | Michael Carrington | February 4, 2005 | 303 | N/A |
Raven and Chelsea apply for jobs at a store, but, despite Raven's obvious skills and Chelsea's incompetence, Raven is rejected while Chelsea is the one chosen. However, Raven has a vision that the manager, Chloe Hunter, is a racist and this was the only reason she didn't get the job. This also affects Chelsea and Eddie, the latter who mentions when he was younger that he had a friend in 2nd grade whose father wouldn't let him play with Eddie because of his skin color. Raven decides to go undercover for a TV news report (with Chelsea and Eddie's help) to expose the truth. Meanwhile, Cory has to write a report on Black History Month, but doesn't want to, until he has a dream where Frederick Douglass (Rondell Sheridan), Bessie Coleman (T'Keyah Crystal Keymáh), and Scott Joplin (Orlando Brown) introduce him to the world of black history. Guest stars: Devika Parikh as Yolanda
| 54 | 11 | "Dog Day Aftergroom" | Casey Lynn De Stefano | Theresa Akana & Stacee Comage | February 11, 2005 | 317 | N/A |
Chelsea gets a job at "Camp Woof-Woof", a dog daycare in the neighborhood. Even though she works for free, Raven and Eddie decide to work for money. Their most important client is a famous show Bichon Frise that is in a show that very night. Unfortunately, Raven's pink armband falls into the tub while she and Eddie are bathing the dog, turning it bright pink! The three then scramble to fix the problem before the dog show starts. At home, Victor joins a knitting club full of old ladies, who prove to be quite formidable when Cory tries to sell their products. Special guest star: Kathie Lee Gifford as Claire Guest stars: Suzanne Krull as Judge, Helen Slayton-Hughes as Mildred
| 55 | 12 | "The Royal Treatment" | Christopher B. Pearman | Sarah Jane Cunningham & Suzie V. Freeman | February 18, 2005 | 310 | N/A |
Raven is the first friend of a new exchange student (Dempsey Pappion). He offers her a feather, which she accepts confusedly. She later invites him back to her house; after spending some time getting acquainted with Raven's friends, he gives her a seashell. Chelsea thinks it's a crush – and she is right, as the exchange student then sends her a beautiful dress. She puts it on – against her mother's wishes – and goes to a party at the embassy (seen in a vision). Tanya, though, soon discovers that Raven has inadvertently accepted a marriage proposal from the Prince of his country, Shakobi (a fictional African nation). Eddie and Chelsea must go undercover as dancers to stop the ceremony. Meanwhile, Cory's pet rat, Lionel, wins a magazine photo contest, and an eccentric photographer comes to the house. Guest stars: Reginald VelJohnson as Ambassador, Jim Wise as Aldo, Dempsy Pappion as Tendaji
| 56 | 13 | "Art Breaker" | Gregory Hobson | Josh Lynn & Danny Warren | February 25, 2005 | 308 | N/A |
Raven is shocked about Chelsea's sculpture of her: an abstract piece, which blends the real Raven with the bird of the same name, creating a head with an enormous beak. Raven thinks Chelsea is making fun of her, which breaks Chelsea's heart. When Raven has a vision, she accidentally destroys it, leading her to "become a piece of art" at Chelsea's show! Meanwhile, Cory sells soda to kids in milk cartons at school after the school and his home bans sugar. Special guest star: Cyndi Lauper as Ms. Petuto Guest stars: Frankie Ryan Manriquez as William, Stuart Fratkin as Arthur
| 57 | 14 | "Boyz in Commotion" | Debbie Allen | Theresa Akana & Stacee Comage | March 11, 2005 (Note: This episode was first released on Supernaturally Stylish VHS/DVD on December 7, 2004.) | 306 | N/A |
Alana is sent to military school and a girl named Bianca replaces her and takes over her posse. Bianca and her posse make trouble for Raven when the latter must bring in some form of entertainment. She abruptly blurts out that she knows the boys in the band Boyz 'N Motion, and she can get them to perform. Surprisingly, they agree, staying at her house the night before the big show. Unfortunately, the boys get lazy and complacent as the Baxters wait on them, and do not show up for their performance. Raven and her friends disguise themselves as the "Boyz", but in the end, they appear; it seems Tanya scolded them. Meanwhile, Cory hits upon a scheme to take items that the "Boyz" have used, and sell them on the internet. Guest stars: Frankie Ryan Manriquez as William, Erica Rivera as Bianca, Ashley Drane as Muffy, Andrea Edwards as Loca, Michael Copon as Ricky, Ryan Hansen as JJ, Columbus Short as Tre
| 58 | 15 | "Gettin' Out of Dodge" | Rich Correll | Edward C. Evans | April 8, 2005 | 319 | N/A |
Raven accidentally hits Bianca during a game of dodgeball. Surprisingly, it makes her a nice person, leading everyone to think Raven is the toughest girl in school. She abuses her newfound power, and takes over Bianca's old posse, but soon regrets it. The only cure, though, is Raven falling on her. Meanwhile, Larry spends time with Victor which makes Cory jealous. Guest stars: Erica Rivera as Bianca, David Henrie as Larry, Ashley Drane as Muffy, Andrea Edwards as Loca Absent: T'Keyah Crystal Keymáh as Tanya Baxter
| 59 | 16 | "On Top of Old Oaky" | John Tracy | Michael Feldman | April 22, 2005 | 305 | N/A |
While petitioning for the preservation of Old Oaky, the old oak tree in front of the school, Chelsea falls in love with a cute boy named Jake who claims to be a vegetarian, but Raven has a vision of Jake eating ribs at The Chill Grill. Chelsea doubts Raven's vision and cuts ties with both Raven and Eddie. Meanwhile, Cory's band needs a lead singer that has to be a cute girl. But when Cory sees Francesca, he is "deafened" by love and doesn't hear how bad she sings. Guest stars: Ricky Ullman as Jake, Rose Abdoo as Señorita Rodriguez, Frankie Ryan Manriquez as William, David Henrie as Larry, Ashley Rose Orr as Francesca, Christina Leanne Cox as Theresa
| 60 | 17 | "They Work Hard for His Honey" | Eric Dean Seaton | Edward C. Evans | April 29, 2005 | 307 | 4.2 |
Raven, Chelsea, and Eddie get jobs at the school store for service credit from Mrs. DePaulo, who makes Eddie the manager. Everything starts out just right -- until Eddie hires his girlfriend, Chantel, to work there. This makes Raven and Chelsea do all the work, while he and Chantel do nothing. To make matters worse, Eddie told Chantel that he is rich, romancing her with lobsters and steaks; to do this, he constantly borrows money from Raven and Chelsea. They finally tell him off, and Raven has a vision of Eddie reaching into the store's vault, apparently stealing. Eddie really hid a present, though, and Raven soon makes a mess out of things —- in more ways than one! Meanwhile, Cory has a crush on a new assistant teacher in Mrs. Applebaum's class, Miss Bonita, and pretends he is dumb in order to spend more time with her. Victor catches on and has Mrs. Applebaum tutor Cory instead of Miss Bonita. Guest stars: Drew Sidora as Chantel, Mary Jo Catlett as Mrs. Applebaum, Claudia Jordan as Miss Bonita, Amy Hill as Ms. DePaulo Absent: T'Keyah Crystal Keymáh as Tanya Baxter
| 61 | 18 | "Mind Your Own Business" | Eric Dean Seaton | Dennis Rinsler | May 13, 2005 | 327 | N/A |
Raven, Eddie, and Chelsea all decide to join an after-school club, "Future Leaders United in Business" (the FLUB club). At first, they work well with each other to defeat a competing team, but then they must compete against each other for a shopping spree. The competition soon gets the best of their friendship, as they grow suspicious of sabotage. Meanwhile, Cory has installed a hot tub in his room and Victor starts using it, making Cory not use it. Cory and Victor agree to move it out to the backyard. Guest stars: Rose Abdoo as Señorita Rodriguez, Amy Correa as Ambrosia, Alex Weed as Reg, Braden Williams as Troy Absent: T'Keyah Crystal Keymáh as Tanya Baxter
| 62 | 19 | "Hizzouse Party" | Rich Correll | Michael Carrington | June 6, 2005 | 312 | 5.1 |
Victor and Tanya go out of town, leaving Raven and Cory home alone. After Raven accidentally breaks a lamp, she lets Cory throw a party to try to raise enough money to buy the expensive lamp back. However, a scheme of Cory's ends up backfiring on both of them. When Reverend Mattson visits after giving Raven a letter of recommendation, he discovers the party, even that his own son was one of the guests. After the crowd disperses, Reverend Mattson asks Raven for the letter back. However, Cory tells the truth, revealing the lamp Raven broke was a fake. Meanwhile, Victor seems to be falling in love with his in-car navigation system which he names "Sasha", making Tanya jealous. After Raven & Cory's party gets discovered this prompts Victor to never leave Raven and Cory home alone again and to re-hire an old babysitter later shown in "Cake Fear". Guest stars: Rif Hutton as Reverend Mattson, Louis Martin Braga III as Matthew, unknown voice as Sasha Note: Raven's "jam" resembles the song Crazy In Love by Beyoncé. When Victor points out his GPS to Tanya, he gives the GPS the name of Sasha, which could be a reference to Beyoncé's alter ego name, Sasha Fierce.
| 63 | 20 | "Mismatch Maker" | Fred Savage | Edward C. Evans | June 7, 2005 | 325 | 4.3 |
Eddie and Chantel break up, and Raven accidentally makes things worse between the two. Chantel ends up going to the basketball ceremony with Tyrone, in an effort to make Eddie jealous. Raven, feeling bad that Eddie no longer wants to go to his own ceremony sets up her "cousin" Seyoncé to be Eddie's date to the ceremony. Meanwhile, Cory has to struggle to find the owner of a dog that followed him home, soon to be found by his owner who looks exactly like Cory (which is the reason suspected for why the dog followed him home). Guest stars: Drew Sidora as Chantel Absent: T'Keyah Crystal Keymáh as Tanya Baxter Note: Kyle Massey plays Chauncy, who looks exactly like Cory.
| 64 | 21 | "Chef-Man and Raven" | Rich Correll | Story by : Jim Reynolds; Teleplay by : Lanny Horn & Sarah Watson | June 8, 2005 | 314 | 5.0 |
Victor's old culinary school rival Leonard Stevenson, now the host of the cooking show "Captain Cook-Off's Kitchen Challenge", challenges him to a cook-off on Captain Cook-Off’s Kitchen Challenge, and Raven’s visions help her father prepare. When Leonard’s daughter Julie sabotages Victor’s dish with mushrooms, Raven has an allergic reaction but insists on finishing, and Victor wins with a quadruple fish flip. Meanwhile, Cory’s sagging pants get him into trouble with Tanya and destroy a new desk. Guest stars: James McCauley as Captain Cook-Off/Leonard Stevenson, Kelli McCarty as Lorraine, Shelley Buckner as Gourmet Girl
| 65 | 22 | "When in Dome" | Marc Warren | Sarah Jane Cunningham & Suzie V. Freeman | June 9, 2005 | 328 | 4.7 |
Chelsea's friend, Jennifer (Rheagan Wallace), from vegetarian camp visits, and Raven becomes jealous when she realizes they have more in common with each other than she does with Chelsea. To try and save her friendship with Chelsea, Raven joins her in a Bio-Dome, and doesn't exactly get along with the ecosystem. Meanwhile, Cory freaks out when Cindy tells him that they "needed to talk". He goes to Eddie for advice, and he said that whenever a girl said that she "needed to talk", it usually meant that she wanted to break up. So, Cory decides to break up with Cindy first in front of everybody, but it turns out Cindy never wanted to break up with Cory at all. So, Cory forces Eddie to help him get Cindy back. Guest stars: Rheagan Wallace as Jennifer, Jordyn Colemon as Cindy, Rhyon Nicole Brown as Madison, Mary Jo Catlett as Mrs. Applebaum Notes: This episode featured a giant plant which resembled the Audrey II from The Little Shop of Horrors. The tour guide character Charlotte was played a then-unknown Tiffany Haddish. Absent: T'Keyah Crystal Keymáh as Tanya Baxter
| 66 | 23 | "Too Much Pressure" | Rich Correll | Dava Savel | June 10, 2005 | 323 | 4.4 |
Raven and Chelsea desperately want to appear in Pressure's new video, "Gotta Get You Back". This leads them to trick Cory into taking dancing lessons, more specifically the Dance of the Yak. Cory tries to quit the lessons, but due to a promise to Victor, he can't. Chelsea ends up revealing Raven's true intentions to Cory, who later tells his ordeal to Pressure. Raven ends up in Pressure's music video, but not exactly the way her vision depicted. This is the second episode in which Raven looks at the camera. She is seen doing this in her vision. Guest stars: Kevontay Jackson as Pressure, Lauri Johnson as Madame Blecch, Yvette Nicole Brown as Monica Note: Pressure is a parody of Usher. Absent: T'Keyah Crystal Keymáh as Tanya Baxter
| 67 | 24 | "The Grill Next Door" | Sean McNamara | Michael Feldman | July 8, 2005 | 324 | N/A |
Victor's old rival, Leonard Stevenson, returns, and opens a similar restaurant near The Chill Grill, thus named The Hill Grill. Raven then has a vision that The Chill Grill goes out of business. Meanwhile, Cory and his band plan to perform to get his father's customers back, but after rejecting Stanley, they lose the customers to The Hill Grill, and made them more famous. Raven has to pretend to be Stanley's girlfriend, so that he will sing at The Chill Grill, and bring back the customers. Guest stars: David Henrie as Larry, Frankie Ryan Manriquez as William, James McCauley as Leonard Stevenson, Bobb'e J. Thompson as Stanley Absent: T'Keyah Crystal Keymáh as Tanya Baxter
| 68 | 25 | "Extreme Cory" | Rich Correll | Theresa Akana & Stacee Comage | July 8, 2005 | 326 | N/A |
Cory wants to be in a hip "extreme" skateboarding group, but he doesn't know how to skateboard. So he asks Raven to help him get in the club. Meanwhile, Eddie asks Chelsea to tape his life video but she keeps getting distracted. Guest stars: Brittany Lapham as Scabz, Brandon Smith as Razor Absent: T'Keyah Crystal Keymáh as Tanya Baxter
| 69 | 26 | "Point of No Return" | Sean McNamara | Edward C. Evans | July 23, 2005 | 330 | N/A |
Victor gives Raven $100 to buy a calculator for her trigonometry class at school. However, she decides to buy an outfit to wear to an upcoming party instead, planning to return the outfit the next day and get her money back to buy the calculator. Unfortunately, Raven accidentally gets lipstick on the blouse and then shrinks it in the wash, rendering it unable to be returned – though this doesn't stop Raven from trying. Meanwhile, Victor and Cory take an annual father-son shopping trip. Cory doesn't like the trip, especially when Victor embarrasses him in front of girls he likes. Guest stars: Taylor Negron as Frank Absent: T'Keyah Crystal Keymáh as Tanya Baxter
| 70 | 27 | "Country Cousins: Parts 1 & 2" | Sean McNamara | Dennis Rinsler (Part 1) | July 29, 2005 | 320 | 4.2 |
| 71 | 28 | "Country Cousins: Parts 1 & 2" | Sean McNamara | Michael Carrington (Part 2) | July 29, 2005 | 321 | 4.2 |
Raven and Chelsea travel to the country in an attempt to settle a long-lasting family feud over a gravy boat that was thought to be stolen by Victor. Meanwhile, Cory wrongfully uses his older brother-like relationship with Eddie, making the latter cover for him while he snuck out for a long time. Guest stars: Kym Whitley as Cousin Vicky, and Giovonnie Samuels as Betty Jane Note: Raven-Symoné plays quadruple roles as Raven Baxter, Auntie Faye, Cousin Delroy, and Baby G. Also, this is the other cousin was shown in the episode, Dissin' Cousins. This is also an hour long episode.
| 72 | 29 | "Food for Thought" | Rich Correll | Marc Warren | September 18, 2005 | 316 | N/A |
The cafeteria at Raven's school is turned into a food court full of junk food. All of the students love the food, except Chelsea, who sees it as unhealthy. As all of the teens gradually become slower, fatter, and less energetic, Raven saves herself by seeing a future in which everyone at school grows a huge posterior! She and Chelsea must stop the "attack of the giant booties", which becomes hard when the food court begins to offer breakfast programs and take-out. To make matters worse, the junk-filled court could become a nationwide chain in all schools if Raven's school votes "yes" to the program. Can she and Chelsea save the day before everyone suffers from "a lot of junk in the trunk"? Meanwhile, Cory hires an assistant, Brad, to help with his various responsibilities. However, the two fall out when Brad refuses to do Cory's homework for him and Cory consequently threatens to withhold Brad's pay. Ultimately, Brad ends up quitting over the dispute, and upon learning why, Victor and Tanya scold Cory and force him to do the work himself. Cory, Victor and Tanya later see an interview with disgruntled assistants, one of them being Judge Foodie's bailiff Harold, who was distraught over the fact that Judge Foodie wasn't even a real judge, and the other being Brad, who had described Cory as a "12 year old monster" and shows his newly written book, "My Week With The Beast". Special guest star: Mindy Sterling as Judge Foodie Guest stars: Devika Parikh as Yolanda, Jon Wellner as Brad, Christopher T. Wood as Bailiff Note: This is the final episode that T'Keyah Crystal Keymáh as Tanya Baxter is present in. She is no longer present in anymore episodes after this episode; in Season 4, it is revealed that Tanya moved the England to study international law. However, she reprises her role in Raven's Home.
| 73 | 30 | "Mr. Perfect" | Rich Correll | Michael Carrington | October 7, 2005 | 329 | N/A |
Raven has a vision that her "perfect" boyfriend is "too perfect" for her, so she tries to save their relationship. Guest stars: Bobb'e J. Thompson as Stanley, Tyrone Burton as Andre Absent: T'Keyah Crystal Keymáh as Tanya Baxter
| 74 | 31 | "Goin' Hollywood" | Rich Correll | Dennis Rinsler & Marc Warren | November 4, 2005 | 333 | 3.7 |
Cory wins a brief role on a TV show, "Better Days", where the child actress named Ally Parker (Alyson Stoner) on the show wants to try life as a regular kid. Ally joins public school with her nerdy cousin Carly, where she meets mean girl Chrissy and the obsessive activities coordinator Arvin, the latter of whom convinces her to sign up for the talent show. The talent show ends with a dance battle between Ally and Chrissy. However, Ally falls off of the stage and injures her nose, not being able to kiss guest star Justin Banks. During the live taping of the show, many interruptions happen: Cory struggles to say his line, garnering embarrassment for Victor and Raven; Ally spills something while trying to avoid Justin kissing her; and Cory interrupting Ally's kiss. When Ally confesses about her injury to the director Dava, she reworks the scene, having Carly as a double for Ally. Cory successfully says his line as well. Ally goes back to school. Special guest star: Jackée Harry as Dava Guest stars: Alexander Bass as Arvin, Allie Grant as Carly, Alyson Stoner as Ally Parker, Skyler Samuels as Chrissy, Scout Taylor-Compton as Lauren Parker, Bryant Johnson as Nick, Dylan Patton as Justin Banks Note: This episode was intended to be a backdoor pilot for a TV series titled "Better Days" following the Ally Parker character. The show was scrapped, but the premise of balancing a normal life while being famous was a major theme of Hannah Montana, which premiered 4 months after this episode. Absent: T'Keyah Crystal Keymáh as Tanya Baxter
| 75 | 32 | "Save the Last Dance" | Sean McNamara | Marc Warren | November 25, 2005 | 334 | N/A |
Raven has a vision that she is at the prom with a man and wants him to be her prom date, but doesn't know who he is. When she is unable to find him before the prom, she ends up going alone with Eddie and Chelsea, who have dates, until Devon shows up and becomes her date. Meanwhile, Cory is concerned that he may have a hairy back. Special guest star: Jonathan McDaniel as Devon Carter Guest stars: Kevin Farley as Felix, Jordyn Coleman as Cindy, Drew Sidora as Chantel, Ben Ziff as Danny, Charles Michael Davis as Trevor Absent: T'Keyah Crystal Keymáh as Tanya Baxter
| 76 | 33 | "Cake Fear" | Rondell Sheridan | Theresa Akana & Stacee Comage | December 16, 2005 | 332 | N/A |
Victor does not trust Raven and Cory to be home alone when he goes away for the weekend, because last time (in the episode "Hizzouse Party") they threw a party with a mechanical bull. Victor re-hires an old babysitter named Miss Patterson (Mary Gross), aka "Push-over Patterson". When she first arrives, she is the same old push-over, but she soon becomes oddly protective of a mysterious bag she carries with her wherever she goes. When she takes a shower, Raven, Cory, Eddie and Chelsea look in her bag and find a scrapbook with newspaper articles describing Miss Patterson as a prison escapee seeking revenge. Years ago, Raven and Cory ate an entire birthday cake that was intended for their mom, and blamed Miss Patterson for it. Now, they are convinced she has returned for revenge. In the end, Raven and Cory fall victim (with Victor's knowledge) to a hidden-camera prank show known as Revenge of the Babysitter. Guest stars: Mary Gross as Miss Patterson, Joe Sabatino as Officer Watson Absent: T'Keyah Crystal Keymáh as Tanya Baxter
| 77 | 34 | "Vision Impossible" | Marc Warren | David Brookwell & Sean McNamara | January 6, 2006 (Note: This episode was first released in Raven's House Party VHS/DVD on December 6, 2005.) | 335 | N/A |
Raven has a problem with her visions and calls Dr. Sleevemore, considering having them removed permanently. Meanwhile, Chelsea tries to sell mushroom shampoo and Dr. Sleevemore figures out that with Raven using the mushroom shampoo, it is making the part of her brain that makes her have visions of the future have an allergic reaction because Raven is allergic to mushrooms. However, Raven still wants them removed, saying that they only cause trouble. Out of all people, Cory makes Raven realize that her visions sometimes cause good. As Dr. Sleevemore gets Raven ready for vision removal, she tries to stop it, causing a malfunction that launches her out of a chair. Special guest star: Jonathan McDaniel as Devon Carter Guest stars: Brian George as Dr. Sleevemore, Johari Johnson as Police Officer Note: This episode has a scene from the episode "The Four Aces," which was a display error since the latter only aired ten days after the former. Absent: T'Keyah Crystal Keymáh as Tanya Baxter
| 78 | 35 | "The Four Aces" | Debbie Allen | Michael Feldman | January 16, 2006 | 331 | N/A |
Raven does a community service project at a retirement home, and is assigned to Ms. Rhonnie Wilcox (Della Reese), a disgruntled former jazz singer. Along the way, she discovers that "The Chill Grill" was once a swinging nightclub called "The Four Aces". To draw Rhonnie out of her shell, Raven plans a huge themed party, featuring jazzy performances from the whole cast. Finally, Ms. Wilcox performs, and brings the house down. Meanwhile, Cory buys matching rings for Cindy and himself from Stanley. However, the ring turns his finger green, and asks Stanley for a refund. At the party, Cory sees Stanley talking with Cindy. He asks Cindy to not listen to whatever Stanley said. However, Cindy tells Cory that Stanley told her about his struggles finding a gift for her. Cory thanks Stanley. Special guest star: Della Reese as Miss Rhonnie Wilcox Guest stars: Bobb'e J. Thompson as Stanley, Lee Weaver as Mr. Jenkins, Linda Porter as Gertie Grossman, Jordyn Colemon as Cindy, Rhyon Nicole Brown as Madison Notes: Even though "Vision Impossible" aired before this episode, a scene from this episode is seen in "Vision Impossible". This is also the first time in the show's history that Raven *thinks* she has a vision from the past. Absent: T'Keyah Crystal Keymáh as Tanya Baxter
