= That's So Raven season 2 =

That's So Raven
- Season 2
- Starring: Raven; Orlando Brown; Kyle Massey; Anneliese van der Pol; T'Keyah Crystal Keymáh; Rondell Sheridan
- No. of episodes: 22

Release
- Original network: Disney Channel
- Original release: October 3, 2003 – September 24, 2004

Season chronology
- ← Previous; Season 1 Next → Season 3

The second season of That's So Raven aired on Disney Channel from October 3, 2003, to September 24, 2004. The season deals with the Baxter family, Raven (Raven-Symoné), Cory (Kyle Massey), Tanya Baxter (T'Keyah Crystal Keymáh) and Victor Baxter (Rondell Sheridan) as they continue to manage with Raven and her ability to see into the future. Orlando Brown and Anneliese van der Pol co-star as Raven's best friends, Eddie Thomas and Chelsea Daniels.

Guest stars for this season included: Rose Abdoo, Paula Abdul, Adrienne Bailon, Patrick Bristow, Haylie Duff, Ashley Eckstein, Judyann Elder, David Henrie, Amy Hill, Lawrence Hilton-Jacobs, Jonathan McDaniel, Faizon Love, Wesley Mann, Tom Virtue, and Debra Wilson.

In 2004, this season's original opening was replaced with season three's opening for daytime network rebroadcasts and subsequent syndication without any explanation, making the original opening rare. The original opening was retained for Disney+.

== Cast ==
- Raven-Symoné as Raven Baxter
- Orlando Brown as Eddie Thomas
- Kyle Massey as Cory Baxter
- Anneliese van der Pol as Chelsea Daniels
- T'Keyah Crystal Keymáh as Tanya Baxter
- Rondell Sheridan as Victor Baxter

== Episodes ==
- This season consists of 22 episodes.

That's So Raven Season 2 episodes
| No. overall | No. in season | Title | Directed by | Written by | Original release date | Prod. code | U.S. viewers (millions) |
|---|---|---|---|---|---|---|---|
| 22 | 1 | "Out of Control" | Gerren Keith | Sarah Jane Cunningham & Suzie V. Freeman | October 3, 2003 | 203 | N/A |
The Baxters are all excited about the opening of Victor’s restaurant, “The Chill Grill”. Raven believes The Chill Grill can become a hangout for the kids at her school, so she heavy-handedly advises her family on how to make the restaurant cool. Raven is trying to get the attention of Devon as well, and tells Chelsea and Eddie that she’s going to need their help, but they tell her they have other plans. Raven’s not used to getting blown off by her friends, and when she has a vision of Eddie and Chelsea about to kiss, she gets worried. Victor tells Raven she should ask them about what she saw, but they tell her that nothing’s going on. Raven doesn’t believe them, and her suspicions are confirmed when they are passing notes in class organizing to meet at Chelsea’s house that afternoon. We find out that Eddie and Chelsea are only meeting because they are practicing a dance routine for the Chill Grill opening. However, when Raven comes to their house masquerading as a plumber, she is still unaware of what is going on between them. However, Raven learns the truth when she drills a hole through the bathroom wall, through which she sees her misinterpreted vision come true. At the restaurant opening, Raven learns that Eddie and Chelsea aren’t dating. They were only rehearsing for their dance number. After they do their dance, they apologize to Raven for keeping it a secret, and Raven apologizes for being so bossy and controlling. Special guest star: Jonathan McDaniel as Devon Carter Guest stars: Sean McNamara as Plumber, Stuart Pankin as Mr. Grozowtski
| 23 | 2 | "Don't Have a Cow" | Rich Correll | Michael Carrington | October 17, 2003 | 204 | N/A |
After not getting invited to Alana's Halloween party at the Chill Grill, Raven and Chelsea prepare a wishing spell from a magical book to get invited and have the best costumes. While casting it, Chelsea accidentally drops an anti-beef pin (which she was wearing after Victor served her Raven's burger earlier) into the cauldron. As a result, Raven and Chelsea find themselves slowly turning into cows and are forced to go to the party to stop the spell after Eddie takes the book. They struggle to find Eddie as they become more cowlike in both appearance and behavior, culminating in Chelsea eating the page they needed to reverse the spell. Raven and Chelsea end up completely transforming into Holstein cows as they win the costume contest before it's revealed the entire night was a vision, allowing Raven to stop Chelsea from eating meat and prevent them from becoming livestock. Meanwhile, Cory chooses to go trick-or-treating with his friend rather than his parents, upsetting Victor and giving Tanya the idea that the two of them should go trick-or-treating without their children. Special guest star: Adrienne Bailon as Alana Guest stars: Andrea Edwards as Loca, Ashley Drane as Muffy, Frankie Ryan Manriquez as William Note: This is the first episode to have the whole storyline in a vision.
| 24 | 3 | "Run, Raven, Run" | Rich Correll | Marc Warren | November 14, 2003 | 202 | N/A |
Raven has a vision of a runaway TV cart colliding with Raven’s rival, Alana, in the school hallway; when the TV cart comes, Raven pushes Alana out of the way, and Alana accidentally falls into blue paint. Alana goes to the hair salon to have the paint removed, and Raven follows so she can apologize. However, Raven overhears Alana saying she will get revenge on her. Raven impersonates a hairdresser, and when she's fixing Alana's hair, her gum gets accidentally stuck to it. Loca and Muffy show up and point out that Raven has damaged Alana's hair further, but Raven manages to escape the hair salon silently. Dreading facing Alana at school the next day, Cory and his genius friend William (who have chicken pox) agree to help Raven the next day with technology, which helps her avoid Alana at school. Special guest stars: Jonathan McDaniel as Devon Carter, Adrienne Bailon as Alana Guest stars: Andrea Edwards as Loca, Ashley Drane as Muffy, Frankie Ryan Manriquez as William. Note: Even though Devon and Alana were formally introduced in this episode, Devon and Alana appeared in "Out of Control" and "Don't Have a Cow" respectively. This is due to the episodes airing in a mixed production order. Absent: T'Keyah Crystal Keymáh as Tanya Baxter
| 25 | 4 | "Clothes Minded" | Sean McNamara | Edward C. Evans | January 1, 2004 | 207 | N/A |
When Principal Lawler introduces a new school uniform, Raven decides to protest, and ends up being the only one, but was supported by Alana and her posse. When she has a vision of the group seeking revenge, Raven attempts to stop their scheme, which involves a wheel of odorous cheese being put into a hot air vent, and framing Eddie and Chelsea. Meanwhile, Cory's pet gets a credit card in the mail, which Cory and William use to buy expensive stuff, until Victor tells them that someone will eventually have to pay for it. Special guest star: Adrienne Bailon as Alana Guest stars: Andrea Edwards as Loca, Ashley Drane as Muffy, Frankie Ryan Manriquez as William, Wesley Mann as Mr. Lawler
| 26 | 5 | "Four's a Crowd" | Rich Correll | Michael Feldman | January 30, 2004 | 206 | N/A |
Raven goes on her first real date with her crush, Devon, and grows anxious when she has a vision that he's going to kiss her on the date. Devon's jealous little sister Nadine tries to keep them from dating. Special guest star: Jonathan McDaniel as Devon Carter Guest stars: Jordan Moseley as Nadine Carter, Robin Shorr as Randi
| 27 | 6 | "Hearts and Minds" | Rich Correll | Michael Feldman | February 6, 2004 | 212 | N/A |
When Raven has a vision of Cory getting no valentine she tries to give him tips but they don't work, so Eddie teaches him to rap to get a boost of confidence. The next day Cory raps to Danielle but it backfires when all the girls fall for him at school prompting Cory to get in way over his head because the girls loved his rap skills and wanting to be his valentine only for Raven to humiliate him in a rap battle. Meanwhile, Chelsea has to have her new boyfriend approved by Tanya and Victor since her parents are away and Raven tries to mail a giant Valentines card to Devon. Special guest star: Jonathan McDaniel as Devon Carter Guest stars: Staci Lynn Fletcher as Andrea, Destiny Edmond as Danielle, John Jimmo as Curtis
| 28 | 7 | "Close Encounters of the Nerd Kind" | John Tracy | Josh Lynn & Danny Warren | March 19, 2004 | 211 | 2.4 |
Raven gets invited to a convention for Devon's favorite show, "Astro Force 5". Raven doesn't want to go, but when she has a vision of Devon nuzzling with another girl, she and Chelsea crash the convention -- in disguise, of course. Eddie also crashes the convention, but he intends to meet a female star on the show whom he has a crush on. As it turns out, nuzzling is just the traditional greeting on "Astro Force 5". Meanwhile, Cory has a new money scheme -- pretending to read the minds of animals. Special guest star: Jonathan McDaniel as Devon Carter Guest stars: David Henrie as Larry, Frankie Ryan Manriquez as William, Christopher Malpede as Horace, Armelia McQueen as Curvacia
| 29 | 8 | "That's So Not Raven" | Sean McNamara | Dennis Rinsler | April 9, 2004 | 201 | N/A |
Raven has a vision of herself modeling a dress that she designed. She is accepted into the fashion industry modeling her clothes. But when it appears in the magazine, her body has been altered, and she appears much thinner than she really is. She is upset that her own body was not used, and also that the head of the agency only believes that there is only one look for all models. In the end Raven learns that it's what's on the inside that counts not the outside. Meanwhile, Cory tries to convince his parents that he should get a new video game system. Guest stars: Frankie Ryan Manriquez as William, Amy Hill as Ms. DePaulo, Marcia Ann Burrs as Mrs. Beckman, Caroline Rice as Mimi, Karen Sharpe as Emayshia, Symba Smith as Victoria Kayne
| 30 | 9 | "Blue in the Face" | Sean McNamara | Maisha Closson | April 16, 2004 | 208 | N/A |
Raven must get a good grade on a science project, or else she'll have to miss going to the Blue Rain concert with Devon. When Victor gets a new paper shredder, he becomes totally obsessed with it. Meanwhile, Cory's intelligent friend William needs a makeover. Raven makes a deal with William, to trade projects. William does his share of the deal, but when Raven fails her part, they shred the project, which Raven had to fix up a night. Asleep from lack of sleep, she groggily and mistakenly tells Victor that her paper is trash. He shreds the paper and Raven gets mad. Then by accident at school, she ends up creating an unstable chemical reaction in the science lab, which causes Raven and Victor (who had come to bring Raven her formula project paper) to get covered in some sort of blue substance that will not wash off for a few days. Raven's grounded until her grades improve, Devon comes over to “bring the concert to [her]”. Meanwhile, Cory meets a girl named Madison, but she does not like William, and Tanya asks Cory if he wants to be with one who hates his best friend. In the end, Cory chooses William over Madison. Special guest star: Jonathan McDaniel as Devon Carter Guest stars: Frankie Ryan Manriquez as William, Rhyon Nicole Brown as Madison, Clinton Jackson as Mr. Holloway
| 31 | 10 | "Spa Day Afternoon" | Carl Lauten | Dava Savel | May 21, 2004 | 209 | N/A |
Raven and her mother spend a day at a health spa, but all Raven really wants to do is meet her favorite singer, Maisha. Things go from bad to worse when Maisha's dog jumps into Raven's bag, and Maisha thinks Raven "dog-napped" it and Raven is grounded and gets into trouble by her mother Tanya for accidentally stealing Maisha's dog named Truffles. Guest stars: Debra Wilson as Maisha, Lee Reherman as Carl
| 32 | 11 | "Leave It to Diva" | Donna Pescow | Marc Warren | May 28, 2004 | 213 | N/A |
Raven finds out that she can read minds after suffering "a psychic cold". Meanwhile, Victor's posh mother, who is unaware that Raven is psychic, comes to town, and wants her granddaughter, Raven, to join her "White Glove Society" as a junior member. However, things go horribly wrong when Cory's pet rat, Lionel, "interrupts" the meeting. This causes the ladies to scream and panic. In the end, Raven admits her secret to her grandmother, and she accepts her secret, like how she should have accepted Tanya's mother. Guest stars: Judyann Elder as Loretta Baxter, Phyllis Applegate as Penelope
| 33 | 12 | "There Goes the Bride" | Erma Elzy-Jones | Sarah Jane Cunningham & Suzie V. Freeman | June 11, 2004 | 216 | N/A |
Raven has a vision that Devon gives her a wedding ring, only for her hopes to be dashed when that ring actually belongs to his father and bride for an upcoming wedding and he is his father's best man. Even worse, Devon and his family are moving to Seattle right after the wedding. Having learned this, Raven tries to stop the wedding by impersonating the bride. Devon then stops Raven and they confess their love for each other and kiss one final time before the wedding. Meanwhile, Cory gives Victor and Tanya a motion-activated singing chicken named Clucky as their anniversary gift, which quickly becomes annoying. Special guest star: Jonathan McDaniel as Devon Carter Guest stars: Jordan Moseley as Nadine Carter, Lawrence Hilton-Jacobs as Mr. Carter, Jossie Thacker as Chandra
| 34 | 13 | "Radio Heads" | Rich Correll | Dennis Rinsler | June 25, 2004 | 215 | N/A |
When Eddie hosts a radio show at school, with Raven as a guest/co-host, Raven and Eddie clash over hosting duties. Things go terribly wrong when Raven makes Eddie mad, and he quits. Raven embarrasses herself on the radio show, and does not know how to operate the machines. In the end, Eddie forgives Raven, and she gives Eddie back his hosting duties. NOTE: Beginning with this episode, the opening for season 3 was used in place of this season’s intro for unknown reasons, and was attached to further broadcasts of all the season’s previous episodes. Guest stars: Rose Abdoo as Señorita Rodriguez, Faizon Love as Cyrus Absent: T'Keyah Crystal Keymáh as Tanya Baxter
| 35 | 14 | "A Goat's Tale" | Debbie Allen | Edward C. Evans | July 2, 2004 | 217 | N/A |
Eddie steals the opposing school's goat mascot, but Chelsea feels sorry for the goat, and "mothers" it. Meanwhile, Cory plays a video game against a girl in Hong Kong, Jing Yee. She seems to be a very skilled player, as she beat Cory with one ship left. Guest stars: Darryl Reed Jr. as Big D, Jessica Yuan as Jing Yee, Shu Lang Tuan as Jing Yee's mom
| 36 | 15 | "He's Got the Power" | John Tracy | Dava Savel | July 9, 2004 | 205 | N/A |
A comet flies over San Francisco, giving Eddie the same psychic powers as Raven, only that he can have a vision whenever he makes the vision face. Unfortunately, the popularity goes to his head, and then gets him into trouble when he falsely predicts a racehorse for an old friend to gamble on. Guest stars: Haylie Duff as Katina, Akeem Smith as Sonny, Eddie Vee as Derek Tan
| 37 | 16 | "Skunk'd" | Christopher B. Pearman | Sarah Jane Cunningham & Suzie V. Freeman | July 16, 2004 | 219 | N/A |
Chelsea invites Raven on the Environmental Club's camping trip. Raven, not enjoying the outdoors, brings along portable gadgets and a luxurious tent. This leads to an argument between Raven and Chelsea, which makes Chelsea think that she and Raven shouldn't be friends. Guest stars: Rose Abdoo as Señorita Rodriguez, Justine Johnson as Mrs. Ferguson
| 38 | 17 | "The Dating Shame" | Sean McNamara | Edward C. Evans & Michael Feldman | July 23, 2004 | 218 | N/A |
Raven and Chelsea go on a TV dating game show called Termi-Date for a chance to date a cute guy named Chad. Raven then has a vision that she'll turn on Chelsea, and call her "a loser". Even though they both said nice things to each other, the director of the show tampered the video tape by taking out the nice bits, and made it sound like it was horribly mean. That's when Raven and Chelsea argue but later reconcile when Eddie plays the nice version thus exposing director's scheme. Meanwhile, Cory lies about a babysitter being with him, so that he can have the house to himself. Cory is happy at first, until he sees a late-night horror movie called Eye of the Zombie 2, and he becomes scared. Guest stars: Roger Lodge as Rodney Rivers, Byron Fox as Chad, Christel Khalil as Crystal, Stephanie Sawyer as Claudia
| 39 | 18 | "The Road to Audition" | Debbie Allen | Beth Seriff & Geoff Tarson | July 30, 2004 | 214 | 4.3 |
After Raven has a vision about a representative from her favorite show, "Undercover Superstar", posing as a janitor at her school, the entire student body seeks to impress him with their performances, only to discover he works for the health department. Refusing to perform again for another "janitor", Raven misses the opportunity to impress a real talent scout, Paula Abdul. Guest stars: Patrick Bristow as Tony, Dana Davis as Jasmine, Shane Haboucha as Emmett, Paula Abdul as Undercover Superstar's Talent Scout
| 40 | 19 | "The Lying Game" | Rich Correll | Dennis Rinsler & Marc Warren | August 6, 2004 | 220 | 4.3 |
It's Career Day, and Raven is assigned to be a teacher's aide -- in Cory's classroom. When they arrive home fighting and dishevelled, they both offer an outlandish tale about what happened in the classroom that day. Raven insists that she was the picture of perfection, and Cory was obnoxious; while Cory's story describes Raven as a witch-like character, who tormented the children. In the end, Larry, Cory's classmate and friend, reveals that "it was all an accident". Meanwhile Chelsea is assigned to work at the police station under Detective Ramirez and Eddie to a sofa warehouse. While Chelsea enjoys policework, Eddie fails to sell furniture to Victor and Tonya. In the end, it turns out that their career evaluations were all wrong, the teacher having made up the results. Guest stars: Mary Jo Catlett as Mrs. Applebaum, David Henrie as Larry, Stuart Pankin as Mr. Grozowtski
| 41 | 20 | "Numb and Numb-er" | Rondell Sheridan | Michael Feldman & Dava Savel | September 10, 2004 | 221 | N/A |
Cory has to go to the dentist. He is terrified, so Raven goes with him to calm his fears. When they get there, Raven sits in the dentist's chair to show Cory that there is nothing to be scared of - until the dentist (Tom Virtue) tells her that she has a cavity. Suddenly scared, the two of them try to run, ending up with Raven posing as "Dr. Thinkenfast" ("Thinking fast"), and Cory as "Dr. Doasisay" ("Do as I say"). Meanwhile, Victor; Chelsea; and Eddie are working on a Chill Grill advertisement video, but struggle over creative control. Guest stars: Tom Virtue as Dr. Horn, Katya Abelsky as Jessie Absent: T'Keyah Crystal Keymáh as Tanya Baxter
| 42 | 21 | "My Big Fat Pizza Party" | John Tracy | Michael Carrington | September 17, 2004 | 210 | N/A |
Raven and Chelsea get waitress jobs at The Chill Grill to raise money to go on a ski trip. They chat with customers, and ignore their duties, so Victor fires them. They persuade him to give them another chance, and try to plan a big party for the restaurant that night. Unfortunately, they both plan a separate party, along with one already booked, leading to three bashes on the same night. Guest stars: Frankie Ryan Manriquez as William, Dana Gonzales as Andrea, David Glowacki as Yutzo the Clown, Helen Slayton-Hughes as Mildred, Tony Longo as Python Absent: T'Keyah Crystal Keymáh as Tanya Baxter
| 43 | 22 | "Shake, Rattle, and Rae" | Marc Warren | Story by : Lanny Horn; Teleplay by : Sarah Watson & Jason M. Palmer | September 24, 2004 | 222 | N/A |
Raven tries to make peace with Alana to avoid suspension from school, by inviting her to what turns out to be her first sleepover. However, things get ugly when Raven has a vision that there'll be an earthquake. Meanwhile, Eddie turns to Victor for driving lessons, though they are not quite what he expects. Special guest star: Adrienne Bailon as Alana Guest stars: Andrea Edwards as Loca, Ashley Drane as Muffy, Johari Johnson as Police Officer Absent: T'Keyah Crystal Keymáh as Tanya Baxter
