= That's So Raven season 1 =

That's So Raven
- Season 1
- Starring: Raven; Orlando Brown; Kyle Massey; Anneliese van der Pol; T'Keyah Crystal Keymáh; Rondell Sheridan
- No. of episodes: 21

Release
- Original network: Disney Channel
- Original release: January 17, 2003 – March 5, 2004

Season chronology
- Next → Season 2

The first season of That's So Raven aired on Disney Channel from January 17, 2003 to March 5, 2004. The season introduces the Baxter family, Raven (Raven-Symoné), Cory (Kyle Massey), Tanya Baxter (T'Keyah Crystal Keymáh), and Victor Baxter (Rondell Sheridan) as they manage with Raven and her ability to see into the future. Orlando Brown and Anneliese van der Pol co-stars as Raven's best friends, Eddie Thomas and Chelsea Daniels.

Guest stars for this season included: Rose Abdoo, Angell Conwell, Brian George, Joshua Harto, Amy Hill, Steven Anthony Lawrence, Jenifer Lewis, Wesley Mann, Niecy Nash, Ernie Sabella, Brenda Song, and Kirsten Storms.

== Production ==
Raven-Symone was announced as part of the cast in November 2001, with production of the first season starting later that month. It was expected to premiere in the fall of 2001.

== Premise ==
The show is set in San Francisco and revolves around a 14-year-old named Raven Baxter, played by Raven-Symoné, and how she gets herself, her friends Eddie and Chelsea, and her family members, such as her brother Cory, out of various situations, usually by using her psychic powers and a variety of disguises.

== Cast ==
- Raven-Symoné as Raven Baxter
- Orlando Brown as Eddie Thomas
- Kyle Massey as Cory Baxter
- Anneliese van der Pol as Chelsea Daniels
- T'Keyah Crystal Keymáh as Tanya Baxter
- Rondell Sheridan as Victor Baxter

== Episodes ==
- This season consists of 21 episodes. Many episodes were aired out of their intended order and the final three episodes aired after the second season had already premiered.

That's So Raven Season 1 episodes
No. overall	No. in season	Title	Directed by	Written by	Original release date	Prod. code	U.S. viewers (millions)
1	1	"Mother Dearest"	Lee Shallat-Chemel	Bob Keyes & Doug Keyes	January 17, 2003	102	3.6
Raven gets mad and tells off her teacher for calling on her when she didn't know an answer. Raven thought the class would have her back, but they don't. Raven's teacher, Mr. Petracelli, requests a parent–teacher conference with Raven's parents. Raven puts on a purple outfit, disguised as her mother. Raven almost pulls it off, however Mr. Petracelli wanted to speak to Raven and her mother at the same time. Mr. Petracelli gets angry and leaves the school. Just then, Raven's parents came to the school and recognize Raven. She loses her phone privileges for two weeks. Meanwhile, Eddie gets his locker taken by someone else. He finally gets the guts to stand up to the bully and gets his locker back. Guest stars: Christopher Aguilar as Brendan, Shane Lyons as Kenny Brookwell, Ernie Sabella as Mr. Petracelli Absent: Anneliese van der Pol as Chelsea Daniels
2	2	"Party Animal"	Rich Correll	Dava Savel	January 17, 2003	109	3.3
Raven has a vision of Cory saying he hates her, so she goes to great lengths to throw him the "best birthday party ever". But, things change, after Victor and Tanya get food poisoning, and can't provide transportation to the zoo. Raven decides to throw a party anyway, and phones around for an animal attraction to come to the house. They manage to find a guy called Reptile Rick, but when he accidentally eats some of the food that poisoned Tanya and Victor, Raven has to take charge and become 'Reptile Raven'! Guest stars: Nick Meaney as Reptile Rick, Deven Lorenza Calhoun as Billy, Michael Tyler Henry as Jamie
3	3	"Test of Friendship"	Rich Correll	Bob Keyes & Doug Keyes	January 17, 2003	107	3.5
Raven has a vision about Eddie failing his Spanish test, which would have gotten him kicked off the basketball team. She also sees the answers in her vision, too. She gets Eddie to agree to study at her house, but he does terribly. When Chelsea accidentally lets slip that Raven saw the answers, Eddie wants her to give them to him, but Raven refuses. He leaves saying she is not a real friend. Raven then tries to convince Señorita Rodriguez to postpone the test, but she doesn't. Raven finally caves and gives Eddie the answers to the test. However, Señorita Rodriguez drafts a new test at the last minute, rendering the answers Raven gave Eddie incorrect. Raven and Chelsea must disguise themselves as window washers to try and warn Eddie of the change. They eventually succeed, and even though Eddie feels like he fails the test, he actually passes and remains on the team. Guest star: Rose Abdoo as Señorita Rodriguez Absent: T'Keyah Crystal Keymáh as Tanya Baxter, Rondell Sheridan as Victor Baxter
4	4	"Wake Up, Victor"	Ken Ceizler	Susan Sherman & Edward C. Evans	January 17, 2003	119	3.4
Cory and his friend Miles attempt to hypnotize Chelsea and Raven. Instead, they hypnotize Victor. However, Victor was supposed to appear on a prestigious cooking show with impatient host Kelly Bryant. Can Raven and her family save her dad from utter failure before it's too late? Guest stars: Steven Anthony Lawrence as Miles Bonay, Jody Howard as Kelly Bryant, Eddie Vee as Derek Tan, J. D. Hall as Dr. Wendel Van Lear
5	5	"A Fish Called Raven"	Fred Savage	Dava Savel & Carla Banks Waddles	January 24, 2003	121	N/A
Raven's visions get the better of her when a malicious student reporter, Serena, threatens to expose her secret to the entire school. Now, it is up to Raven to sabotage Eddie's big basketball game in order to keep her secret intact. Guest star: Spencer Redford as Serena Valentine
6	6	"Smell of Victory"	Lee Shallat-Chemel	Laura Perkins-Brittain	January 31, 2003	101	N/A
Raven becomes annoyed with her assigned partner, Ben Sturky, for a project in science class because Ben is concerned more with studying than with his own hygiene. Ben has a very bad body odor, which is why a lot of people at Bayside call him "Stinky Sturky". While at the school carnival, Raven realizes that even though he smells, he is still a person. Meanwhile, Eddie attempts to win the heart of his latest crush, Crystal, while having a huge zit on his chin. Guest stars: Wesley Mann as Mr. Lawler, Joshua Harto as Ben Sturky, Amy Hill as Ms. DePaulo, Christel Khalil as Crystal, Shane Lyons as Kenny Brookwell Absent: Anneliese van der Pol as Chelsea Daniels
7	7	"Campaign in the Neck"	Sean McNamara	Beth Seriff & Geoff Tarson	February 7, 2003	114	N/A
Raven has a vision that her best friend Chelsea, who is running to be Class President, loses to Ben Sturky in a landslide vote. To prevent her vision from coming true, she enlists Eddie and Cory to help with her campaign by completing students' chores in return for votes for Chelsea. However, as Raven soon discovers, things may not be as easy as they seem. Guest star: Joshua Harto as Ben Sturky Absent: Rondell Sheridan as Victor Baxter
8	8	"Saving Psychic Raven"	Sean McNamara	Michael Feldman & Jeff Abugov	February 21, 2003	120	2.5
After Raven loses a volleyball game for Bayside due to a vision she had on the court, she begins to find solace in a group of fellow teen psychics. Nevertheless, Eddie and Chelsea soon feel abandoned and it is up to Raven to choose which group of friends she will stick with. Guest stars: Tania Raymonde as Carly, Samm Levine as Marvin, Brian George as Dr. Sleevemore, Johari Johnson as Waitress
9	9	"The Parties"	Rich Correll	Jeff Abugov & Michael Feldman	February 28, 2003	116	2.4
Raven is extremely excited when she is hosting her first proper party. But when the most popular girl in Bayside school and Raven's archenemy, Nicki, sabotages her plans and embarrasses Raven in front of her entire school, Rae, Chelsea and Eddie take revenge. However, Raven starts feeling guilty, so she doesn't send the video of Nicki looking like a disaster to Nicki's party. In the end, Raven still gets revenge with poison ivy covered flowers. Guest stars: Kirsten Storms as Nicki Peterson, Shayna Fox as Tracie, Jeremy Ray Valdez as Ricky Rodriguez
10	10	"Ye Olde Dating Game"	Matthew Diamond	Michael Feldman	March 28, 2003	113	N/A
After Raven's vision reveals her crush Gabriel saying he likes her, she makes sure he is her date to the Renaissance Ball, even though Raven is already going with Ben Sturky. Guest stars: Wesley Mann as Lawler, Joshua Harto as Ben Sturky, Arjay Smith as Gabriel, Alexis Lopez as Rachel Absent: T'Keyah Crystal Keymáh as Tanya Baxter, Rondell Sheridan as Victor Baxter
11	11	"Dissin' Cousins"	Rich Correll	Susan Sherman	April 11, 2003	108	2.3
Raven's seemingly perfect cousin Andrea comes to visit from Paris for a week, who annoys Raven so much. Then Raven has a vision that Andrea will kiss Eddie (who has a big crush on Andrea). So she tries to get them to spend time together to get Andrea off her back. Meanwhile, Cory is relegated to sleeping in the living room while Andrea visits, but winds up sleeping with his parents after Victor scares him by joking with him to “beware of the coat closet.” Guest star: Angell S. Conwell as Andrea
12	12	"Teach Your Children Well"	Tony Singletary	Beth Seriff & Geoff Tarson	May 2, 2003	111	2.1
Raven is furious (and embarrassed) when her mom accepts a job teaching English at her school. But when a ruthless note finds its way into Tanya's grasp, it is up to Raven, Eddie and Chelsea to save the note before Raven gets in trouble. Guest stars: Wesley Mann as Mr. Lawler, Chris Wiley as Eric, Brian Sites as Max Absent: Rondell Sheridan as Victor Baxter
13	13	"Driven to Insanity"	Matthew Diamond	Dava Savel	May 30, 2003	104	2.7
Raven goes out with an older boy, against her parents' wishes. As always, the night turns into a disaster when Raven's date turns out to be a disgusting and rude slob, and her parents turn up at the restaurant. Meanwhile, Cory is doing everything in his power to spend some time with Chelsea. Guest star: Stacy Meadows as Matthew
14	14	"A Dog by Any Other Name"	Gerren Keith	Michael Poryes & Susan Sherman	June 20, 2003	103	N/A
Chelsea likes a boy named Sam, but soon discovers that her relationship won't be as easy as it seems as the boy has the same name as her dog. Guest stars: Wesley Mann as Mr. Lawler, Mike Erwin as Sam, Brenda Song as Amber Absent: T'Keyah Crystal Keymáh as Tanya Baxter
15	15	"Saturday Afternoon Fever"	Matthew Diamond	Chip Keyes	July 11, 2003	106	N/A
Raven is assigned to spend quality time with her mother at the movies, even though she is also going on a date to the movies with heartthrob Ricky. Raven tries to juggle both tasks with disastrous results. Guest stars: Jeremy Ray Valdez as Ricky Rodriguez, Nicole Bailey as Jackie, Tessa Ludwick as Denise Absent: Anneliese van der Pol as Chelsea Daniels
16	16	"A Fight at the Opera"	David Kendall	Beth Seriff & Geoff Tarson	August 8, 2003	118	N/A
Raven and Chelsea are both appearing in their school's Classical Arts Festival. However, they dispute over creative differences. Raven wants to do an opera on credit cards while Chelsea is leaning toward problems with acid rain, the during ensuing fight between Raven and Chelsea. The two split up and it is now up to MC Eddie to reconcile the lifelong friends. Guest stars: Amy Hill as Ms. DePaulo, Gabby Soleil as Young Raven, Jaishon Fisher as Young Eddie, Ashlee Ford as Young Chelsea
17	17	"Psychics Wanted"	Sean McNamara	Maria Espada	August 22, 2003	117	N/A
Raven becomes infatuated with a jazz musician called Kwizz. To earn money to buy Jazz Festival tickets, she becomes a psychic for a phone line called Psychic Sidekicks. But when Kwizz calls into the hotline, Raven abuses her power by telling Kwizz that Raven is his “good luck charm.” Guest stars: Kyle Gibson as Jonathan Kwizzowski, Steve Ireland as Hank, Niecy Nash as Madame Cassandra, Terin Alba as Lisa
18	18	"If I Only Had a Job"	Rich Correll	Laura Perkins-Brittain & Carla Banks Waddles	September 12, 2003	110	N/A
After having a vision that her dad was going to get fired, Raven attempts to rescue her dad's place, but instead, gets him fired. Now, she disguises as Liz Anya, it is up to her, Chelsea and Eddie to 'bring Victor back'. But, as always, disguise is needed. Guest stars: Rose Abdoo as Ms. Rodriguez, Patrick Richwood as Mr. Briggs, Fran de Leon as Kayla Absent: T'Keyah Crystal Keymáh as Tanya Baxter
19	19	"Escape Claus"	Matthew Diamond	Carla Banks Waddles	December 5, 2003	105	4.7
In this special Christmas episode, Raven opens her beautiful Christmas present early, but after wearing it at school, she breaks it. She must sacrifice all her favorite Christmas traditions to mend the trouble she caused, even if it means skipping school. Guest star: Ernie Sabella as Mr. Petracelli/Santa Claus
20	20	"Separation Anxiety"	Rich Correll	Dava Savel & Carla Banks Waddles	December 19, 2003	115	N/A
Raven is terrified when she has a vision that her parents will split up. To prevent it from happening, she reconstructs their first date at Rusty's Bar and Grill, a country western restaurant. Guest star: Doug Simpson as Mr. Simpson
21	21	"To See or Not to See"	Rich Correll	Carla Banks Waddles	March 5, 2004	112	4.4
Raven's visions cause embarrassing moments for both Eddie and Chelsea. She is miserable about her visions and being different from others. Instead, she finds solace in her Grandma Viv, who has a secret to tell her. Guest star: Jenifer Lewis as Grandma Viv Absent: T'Keyah Crystal Keymáh as Tanya Baxter, Rondell Sheridan as Victor Baxter
