= Akeelah and the Bee (soundtrack) =

2006 film soundtrack

Akeelah and the Bee (Original Motion Picture Soundtrack)

Soundtrack album by various artists
- Released: April 4, 2006
- Genre: Film soundtrack
- Length: 54:13
- Label: Lionsgate

Akeelah and the Bee (Original Score)

Film score by various artists
- Released: April 4, 2006 (iTunes); April 25, 2006 (CD)
- Recorded: 2006
- Genre: Film score
- Length: 45:21
- Label: Lionsgate
- Producer: Aaron Zigman

Aaron Zigman chronology
Take the Lead (2006)	Akeelah and the Bee (2006)	Step Up (2006)

Akeelah and the Bee (Original Motion Picture Soundtrack) is the soundtrack to the 2006 film of the same name released by Lionsgate Records in a deal with BMG's RED Distribution on April 4, 2006. The album which consisted of 16 tracks has a variety of genres, including pop, R&B and gospel. An original song "All My Girlz" was written specifically for the film, and was performed by Keke Palmer.

The original score for the film was composed by Aaron Zigman, released under the title Akeelah and the Bee (Original Score) as an iTunes exclusive on April 4, and in physical formats on April 25.

== Background ==
After completing the score for Flicka, Zigman had planned to score the film during the holidays, but as Lionsgate pushed the released to April 28, 2006, he had only limited to score the film. More than 45 minutes of the score was written within two and a half weeks without rewriting any of the music. He was inspired by Fishburne's performance to write themes for the film.

The film also featured several songs performed by vocal groups such as Spinners, Staple Singers and Jackson 5, and solo artists such as Al Green, Aretha Franklin among others. It also featured an original song "All My Girlz" performed by Keke Palmer with her sister writing the chorus and also performed the backing vocals. She was also featured in the separate music video which was directed by Atchinson himself.

== Marketing ==
In partnership with Lionsgate and Starbucks Entertainment, the film division arm of the coffee shop chain Starbucks, the company promoted the merchandise related to the film including the audio CDs of the soundtrack.

== Track listing ==
Akeelah and the Bee (Original Motion Picture Soundtrack)
No.	Title	Artist(s)	Length
1.	"A.K.E.E.L.A.H."	Aaron Zigman	0:54
2.	"The Rubberband Man"	The Spinners	3:33
3.	"Respect Yourself"	The Staple Singers	4:54
4.	"ABC"	The Jackson 5	2:58
5.	"L.O.V.E."	Al Green	3:08
6.	"People Get Ready"	The Impressions featuring Curtis Mayfield	2:39
7.	"Stomp!"	The Brothers Johnson	6:20
8.	"Respect"	Aretha Franklin	2:25
9.	"Wake Up Everybody"	Harold Melvin & the Blue Notes	7:32
10.	"Prestidigitation"	Aaron Zigman	1:57
11.	"All My Girlz"	Keke Palmer	3:22
12.	"Proud"	Heather Small	4:29
13.	"Scrabble 1"	Aaron Zigman	1:32
14.	"To Empower"	Res	3:29
15.	"Scrabble 2"	Aaron Zigman	1:04
16.	"Let Your Baby Go"	Erica Rivera	3:57
Total length:			54:13

Akeelah and the Bee (Original Score)
No.	Title	Length
1.	"Akeelah's Neighborhood"	1:22
2.	"ESPN Brunneous"	1:27
3.	"Prestigitation"	2:05
4.	"Do It For Daddy"	0:57
5.	"Old Nationals"	0:25
6.	"Mean-Brother"	0:24
7.	"Dictagorial Gardner"	0:43
8.	"Arrive Regionals"	1:02
9.	"First Bump"	1:21
10.	"Synecdoche"	1:21
11.	"Pastiche"	1:10
12.	"Dad's Theme"	1:03
13.	"Bus To Woodland Hills"	0:48
14.	"Bus Ride Home"	0:43
15.	"It's Final"	0:49
16.	"Quotation"	1:49
17.	"Scrabble 1"	1:26
18.	"Scrabble 2"	1:10
19.	"Akeelah Jumps Rope"	0:53
20.	"We'll See"	0:58
21.	"Pluviosity"	0:39
22.	"Larabee Desk Memory"	0:43
23.	"5,000 Flashcards"	2:13
24.	"Community Reaction"	0:26
25.	"5,000 Coaches"	0:38
26.	"Denice's Robe"	4:04
27.	"Let Me Tell You About Dylan"	1:05
28.	"Nationals"	1:24
29.	"Radiocinate"	1:16
30.	"Spelling Montage"	1:14
31.	"Finals"	0:24
32.	"Merovingean"	1:03
33.	"Competition Montage"	1:25
34.	"A & D To Stage"	2:11
35.	"Xanthosis"	1:09
36.	"The Contest"	1:16
37.	"Akeelah's Turn"	2:15
Total length:		45:21

== Reception ==
Critics based at AllMusic, opined the soundtrack is "rich with R&B classics". Justin Chang of Variety commented that Zigman's score offers "conventional but relatively discreet support".

== Chart performance ==
Chart (2006)	Peak position
US Billboard 200	193
US Top Independent Albums (Billboard)	19
US Top Soundtracks (Billboard)	6

== Accolades ==
Award	Category	Recipients	Result
Black Reel Awards	Best Original Score	Aaron Zigman	Nominated
