= Don't have a cow =

Don't have a cow or Don't Have a Cow may refer to:

- "Don't have a cow, man!", a catchphrase used by character Bart Simpson in marketing material for The Simpsons
- "Don't Have a Cow" (That's So Raven), a 2003 TV episode
- "Don't Have a Cow", a 2002 episode of Canadian TV series The Eleventh Hour
- "Don't Have a Cow", a 2022 song by Whitmer Thomas
