= Erica Rivera =

American actress

- Born: Erica Flor Rivera; December 18, 1988 (age 37); Philadelphia, Pennsylvania, U.S.
- Occupations: Actress; rapper; dancer
- Years active: 2003–present

Erica Flor Rivera (born December 18, 1988) is an American actress who played a minor role as Bianca on the Disney Channel show That's So Raven. Her recordings include "Somebody Stop Me" in the film What a Girl Wants and "Let Your Baby Go" in the film Akeelah and the Bee.

== Formative years ==
Born in Philadelphia, Pennsylvania on December 18, 1988, Erica Rivera is a daughter of Phillip and Marisa Rivera. After she and her family relocated to Florida in 1994, she was enrolled in the gifted program in her community's elementary school, and later attended Dr. Phillips High School in Orlando. Cast in a lead role in the Central Florida Theatre version of Charlie and the Chocolate Factory at the age of seven, she was subsequently signed by the J&J Management Group at the age of ten, was a guest on The Jenny Jones Show in 1999, and toured the United States as a member of the Civic Kids musical theatre group. As a pre-teen, she also sang The Star-Spangled Banner prior to multiple games played by the Orlando Magic, and won a McDonald's Regional Championship Talent Search competition, enabling her to perform on Showtime at the Apollo.

At the age of fifteen, she voiced the character of Agatha Ordinario in the Disney animated television show, The Proud Family.

== Filmography ==
| Year | Title | Role | Noted |
|---|---|---|---|
| 2002 | The ABC's of Acting | Herself | Documentary |
| 2003 | The Proud Family | Agatha Ordinario (voice) | Episode: "The Good, the Bad, and the Ugly" |
| 2005 | That's So Raven | Bianca | 2 episodes |
| 2006 | Half Nelson | Erika | |
