= Wesley Mann =

American character actor (born 1959)

- Born: September 6, 1963 (age 62); Vallejo, California, U.S.
- Occupation: Actor
- Years active: 1988–present

Wesley Mann (born September 6, 1963) is an American character actor, best known for his role as the caterpillar on Adventures in Wonderland and for playing the spluttering teacher-turned-principal Mr. Lawler on That's So Raven.

His acting career began in the late 1980s, landing guest roles on mainstay sitcoms The Golden Girls and Night Court, and appearances in Who's Harry Crumb? and My Stepmother Is An Alien. His distinctive face and demeanor were featured prominently in 1989's Back to the Future Part II, as the high school student who thinks that Marty has just robbed Biff of his wallet. As Biff regains consciousness after having been knocked out by George, Mann (credited as "CPR Kid," but later labeled by fans as the Wallet Guy) shouts "I think he took your wallet!" after Biff, then turns back to the other onlookers and repeats "I think he took his wallet."

Mann has also appeared in the Hudson Valley Shakespeare Festival in Garrison, New York, for nine seasons.

== Filmography ==
=== Film ===
Year	Title	Role	Notes
1988	My Stepmother is an Alien	Grady	
1989	Who's Harry Crumb	Tim	
1989	Chattahoochee	Cop No. 1	
1989	Back to the Future Part II	Lester - CPR Kid	Wallet Guy
1991	L.A. Story	Tony, Gas Station Attendant	
1992	Dragon Slayer	Old Man	English Voice Animated Film
1994	The Shadow	Bellboy	
1995	Angus	Mr. Kessler	
1997	Academy Boyz	Chaplain Sloan	
1997	Critics and Other Freaks	Tourette's Patron	
1999	Every Dog Has Its Day	Jail Keep	
1999	But I'm a Cheerleader	Lloyd	
2000	The Adventures of Rocky and Bullwinkle	Clerk	
2001	Race to Space	Rudolph	
2002	Slackers	Male Executive	
2003	Grand Theft Parsons	Doctor	
2011	Soul Surfer	Calvin	
2011	Tick Tock Boom Clap	Smee Callback	

=== Television ===
Year	Title	Role	Notes
1988	The Golden Girls	Jacob	Episode: "Mother's Day"
1989	Night Court	Mr. Danielson	Episode: "Yet Another Day In The Life"
1989	Living Dolls	Scott	Episode: "I Thought Modeling Was Hard"
1990	Amen	McAllister	Episode: "Two Men, One Woman and a Baby"
1990 - 1991	Parker Lewis Can't Lose	Credit Man / Man #1 / Man #2	3 Episodes
1991	The Wonder Years	Mr. Lively	Episode: "Who's Aunt Rose?"
1992 - 1994	Adventures in Wonderland	Caterpillar / Floyd The Fabulous Fortune Teller / Cooking with Royalty Host	100 Episodes
1993	Grace Under Fire	Gary	Episode: "A Picture's Worth... $9.95"
1994	Murphy Brown	Secretary #69	Episode: "Burger, She Wrote"
1994	Tales from the Crypt	Purdy Lee Dryfus	Episode: "Let the Punishment Fit the Crime"
1995	Full House	Waiter	Episode: "The Producer"
1995	Sisters	Reginald	Episode: "A Good Deed"
1996	Lois & Clark: The New Adventures of Superman	Phil	Episode: "I Now Pronounce You"
1996	The Parent 'Hood	The Hotel Manager	Episode: "I'm O'Tay, You're O'Tay"
1997	Home Improvement	A.J. Sanderson	Episode: "The Karate Kid Returns"
1997	Family Matters	Professor Gates	Episode: "A Mind Is a Terrible Thing to Read"
1998	Rude Awakening	Shlomo The Mouse	Episode: "An Embarrassment of Ritch's"
1999	Get Real	Balloon Bob	Episode: "Stay"
1999	Popular	Snuff	Episode: "Truth or Consequences"
1999	Hefner: Unauthorized	Mad Scientist	Television Film
2001	Even Stevens	Mr. Crappizi	Episode: "Shutterbugged"
2003 - 2004	That's So Raven	Mr. Lawler / Principal Lawler	6 Episodes
2005	Drake & Josh	Blemin	Episode: "We're Married"
2005	Veronica Mars	Ned Flanders Type	Episode: "One Angry Veronica"
2006	That's So Raven	Principal Lawler	Archive Footage / Episode: "Vision Impossible"
2012	Pair of Kings	Counselor	Episode: "Mr. Boogey Shoes"
2013	Project Reality	Unknown	Television Mini-Series
2016	2 Broke Girls	Claude	Episode: "And the Lost Baggage"
2016	Liv and Maddie	Mr. Bell	Episode: "Homerun-A-Rooney"
2017	Lady Dynamite	Bud Gelson	Episode: "Kids Have To Dance"
2018	Lucifer	Bondsman	Episode: "Til Death Do Us Part"
2020	DefunctTV	Caterpillar / Cooking with Royalty Host	Archive Footage / Episode: "The History of Adventures in Wonderland"
2024	Palm Royale	Benny Barnhill	6 Episodes

=== Video games ===
Year	Title	Role
1996	The Beast Within: A Gabriel Knight Mystery	Sepp Huber
2001	Command & Conquer: Yuri's Revenge	Voice
