= Johari Johnson =

American actress

- Born: Chicago, Illinois, U.S.
- Other name: Johari
- Occupations: Actress, comedian
- Years active: 1991-present

Johari Johnson is an American actress, director, comedian, screenwriter and producer.

== Career ==
Johnson has guest starred in a number of notable television series including Moesha, The Steve Harvey Show, Smart Guy, In the House, Eve, Cory in the House, Mr. Show with Bob and David and among other series. She has also guest starred numerous times on The Fresh Prince of Bel-Air and the Disney Channel Original Series That's So Raven, each time playing a different character on both series.

Johnson has her own YouTube channel in which she writes, produces and directs a number videos parodying celebrities such as Whitney Houston, Tameka Cottle and Nicki Minaj.

== Filmography ==
=== Film ===
Year	Title	Role	Notes
2001	Sexy Space Sirens from Siberon	Space Siren 1	Short
2004	Able Edwards	Morgan Farina	
2005	Escorched	Melinda	Short
2005	There's No Jennifer Here	Joy	Short
2008	Pants on Fire	Colleen	

=== Television ===
Year	Title	Role	Notes
1991	True Colors	Marilyn	Episode: "Three for All"
1993–95	The Fresh Prince of Bel-Air	Various Characters	Recurring Guest
1996	Mr. Show with Bob and David	Pootie T's Lover	Episode: "A Talking Junkie"
1997	In the House	Donna	Recurring Cast: Season 3
1997	Smart Guy	Dr. Ross	Episode: "Dumbstruck"
2000	The Steve Harvey Show	Woman Police Officer	Episode: "Black Streak"
2000	Moesha	-	Episode: "D-Money Loses His Patience"
2003	Half & Half	Tiffany	Episode: "The Big Falling for It Episode"
2003	Eve	Party Guest	Episode: "Condom Mania"
2003–06	That's So Raven	Various Characters	Recurring Guest
2007	General Hospital	Concert Organizer	Episode: "Episode #1.11354"
2007	Cory in the House	Reporter	Episode: "A Rat by Any Other Name"
2009	Brothers	Pretty Girl	Episode: "Mom at Bar/Train Buddy"
2009–10	Sonny with a Chance	Clipboard Girl/Tia	Guest Cast: Season 1-2
2013	Calvin and Freddie's Cosmic Encounters	Mrs. Cosmic	Recurring Cast
2014–16	The Thundermans	Polly Peterson	Guest Cast: Season 1 & 4
2015	Real Hollywood	Nana	Episode: "Asians Actin Black"
2016	Nicky, Ricky, Dicky & Dawn	Pamela	Episode: "Nicky, Ricky, Dicky & Sicky"
2020	The Expanding Universe of Ashley Garcia	Woman with Baby	Episode: "No Scientific Basis Whatsoever"
2021	The Valley	Jora Jones	Episode: "Believe in Yourself"
2021	9-1-1: Lone Star	News Anchor	Episode: "2100°"
2021	American Crime Story	Reporter	Episode: "Stand by Your Man"
2021	Saturday Morning All Star Hits!	Colleen Collins	Episode: "Tape 5: NEWS"
2023	Quantum Leap	Senior Nurse	Episode: "Ben, Interrupted"
2023	All Rise	Dolores Brown	Episode: "Passionfruit"
2023–24	Tyler Perry's Assisted Living	Kimberly	Recurring Cast: Season 4-5
2026	Nurse the Dead	Jane Taylor	
