= Rose Abdoo =

American actress and comedian

- Born: Rose Marie Abdoo; November 28, 1962 (age 63); Detroit, Michigan, U.S.
- Education: Michigan State University (BA, MFA)
- Occupations: Actress, comedian
- Years active: 1985–present

Rose Marie Abdoo (born November 28, 1962) is an American actress and comedian, known for her roles as Stars Hollow's local mechanic, Gypsy, on Gilmore Girls, Spanish teacher Señorita Rodriguez on That's So Raven, and Josefina in Hacks.

== Life and career ==
Abdoo was born in Detroit, Michigan. Her father, Peter Abdoo (who is of Lebanese heritage), was a budget analyst for the United States Army Corps of Engineers and her mother, Mary (who was of Dominican, Cuban, and Spanish heritage), was a homemaker.

Abdoo's career began in Chicago, where she performed at various improvisational theaters, including the Improv Institute and four years with The Second City; she went on to develop her own one-woman shows, Who Does She Think She Is? and Get to the Part About Me. She also did a short-lived variety program with Bob Odenkirk and Conan O'Brien called Happy Happy Good Show.

After graduating from Southfield High School, Abdoo earned a Bachelor of Arts in Communication in 1984 and later a Master of Fine Arts in Acting, both from Michigan State University. She was cast in several college theater roles and encouraged by a professor to study improvisation. She went on to move to Chicago, where she joined Second City, performing first in their national touring shows and moving on to their E.T.C. troupe. As a part of E.T.C., Abdoo won a Joseph Jefferson Award as "Best Actress in a Revue" in 1991 for her role in the production We Made a Mesopotamia, Now You Clean It Up, playing what the Chicago Tribune called "the show's meatiest part: an obnoxious, know-it-all tour bus rider." She went on to co-host the awards ceremony in 1994.

She was nominated alongside her castmates for a Best Ensemble Screen Actors Guild award for Good Night, and Good Luck. In March 2008, Abdoo co-starred in the web series The Writers Room on Crackle. Abdoo joined the cast of HBO Max show Hacks as Josefina in 2021.

== Filmography ==
=== Films ===
| Year | Film | Role | Notes |
|---|---|---|---|
| 1997 | My Best Friend's Wedding | Seamstress | |
| 1998 | U.S. Marshals | Donna | |
| 2002 | Unconditional Love | Contest Winner | |
| 2005 | The 40 Year Old Virgin | Mother at Restaurant | |
| 2005 | Good Night, and Good Luck | Millie Lerner | |
| 2006 | I Want Someone to Eat Cheese With | Car Dealership Receptionist | |
| 2006 | Relative Strangers | Frustrated Housewife | |
| 2009 | I Hate Valentine's Day | Attractive Woman | |
| 2009 | Legally Blondes | Sylvia | Video |
| 2011 | Bad Teacher | School Secretary | |
| 2012 | The Guilt Trip | Diana | |
| 2012 | Hotel Transylvania | Additional Voices | |
| 2015 | Cake | Innocencia | |
| 2015 | Hotel Transylvania 2 | Ticket Agent (voice) | |
| 2016 | Other People | Anne | |
| 2017 | Chicanery | Arlene Sobel Rosen | |
| 2020 | Friendsgiving | Linda (Abby's Mom) | |
| 2021 | Barb and Star Go to Vista Del Mar | Bev | |
| 2022 | Something from Tiffany's | Tiffany's Salesperson | |
| 2023 | Leo | Mia's Mom, TJ's Mom (voices) | |
| 2025 | Oh. What. Fun. | Jane | |
| 2026 | That Friend | Maryann | |

=== Television ===
| Year | Title | Role | Notes |
|---|---|---|---|
| 1993 | Johnny Bago | Beverly Florio | Episode: "Big Top Bago" |
| 1994 | Missing Persons | Marjorie Wren | Episode: "All They Had to Do Was Ask.." |
| 1995 | Pride & Joy | Wendy | Episode: "Are You My Mother?" |
| 1999 | Popular | French Teacher | Episode: Windstruck |
| 2000 | Strangers with Candy | Senora Maria de los Angeles Poz Montez Garcia y Perez | Episode: "The Blank Page" |
| 2000 | Curb Your Enthusiasm | Interior Decorator | Episode: "Interior Decorator" |
| 2001 | Three Sisters | Blue Jacket Lady | Episode: "Blame the Messenger" |
| 2002–2007 | Gilmore Girls | Gypsy | Recurring role; 23 episodes |
| 2002 | Haunted | Gladys Yates | Episode: "Nocturne" |
| 2003–2006 | That's So Raven | Senorita Rodriguez | Recurring; 9 episodes |
| 2003 | The Division | | Episode: "Strangers" |
| 2005 | Dr. Vegas | Dr. Navarro | Episode: "Babe in the Woods" |
| 2005 | CSI: NY | Blanca Vasquez | Episode: "The Fall" |
| 2005 | Monk | Mrs. Monk | Episode: "Mr. Monk and Little Monk" |
| 2005 | Inconceivable | Dawn | Episode: "Face Your Demon Semen" |
| 2005 | Malcolm in the Middle | Margie | 2 episodes: "Malcolm's Car" & "Halloween" |
| 2006 | Grand Union | Marybeth | TV movie |
| 2007 | In Case of Emergency | Gladys | Episode: "Stuck in Amber" |
| 2007 | The War at Home | Shirra | Episode: "Kenny Doesn't Live Here Anymore" |
| 2007 | Nurses | Dora | TV movie |
| 2008 | Brothers & Sisters | Miss Clara | Episode: "Do You Believe in Magic" |
| 2009 | Wizards of Waverly Place | Mary Lou Fineman | Episode: "Hugh's Not Normous" |
| 2009 | WordGirl | Great Granny May (voice) | Episode: "Great Granny May" |
| 2009 | Without a Trace | Rachel Gomez | Episode: "Labyrinths" |
| 2010 | Good Luck Charlie | Dr. Tish Tushy | Episode: "Kit and Kaboodle" |
| 2010, 2014 | Pretty Little Liars | Fortune Teller, Dentist | 2 episodes |
| 2011 | 2 Broke Girls | Adin | Episode: "And the Pop-Up Sale" |
| 2012–2013 | Bunheads | Sam | Recurring Role |
| 2012 | Psych | Mary Pasternak | Episode: "Right Turn or Left for Dead" |
| 2012–2015 | Parenthood | Gwen Chambers | Recurring Role |
| 2013 | The Mentalist | Nurse | Episode: "Behind the Red Curtain" |
| 2013–2014 | Shameless | Dr. Vega | 2 episodes |
| 2014 | Garfunkel and Oates | Magda | Episode: "Hair Swap" |
| 2014 | Castle | Dr. Cynthia Swann | Episode: "Driven" |
| 2014 | Grey's Anatomy | Dr. Kim Dawson | Episode: "Bend and Break" |
| 2014 | The Comeback | Marianina | 3 episodes |
| 2014 | Major Crimes | Jane Lewis | Episode: "Leap of Faith" |
| 2014 | Baby Daddy | Nurse Dalrymple | Episode: "The Wheeler and the Dealer" |
| 2015 | The Odd Couple | Helen | Episode: "Jealous Island" |
| 2015 | The Grinder | Judge Stephanie Rossmyre | 2 episodes |
| 2015 | Scandal | Senator Linda Moskowitz | 4 episodes |
| 2016 | Veep | Judge | 2 episodes |
| 2016 | Mike & Molly | Madame Vianne | Episode: "Curse of the Bambino" |
| 2016 | Gilmore Girls: A Year in the Life | Gypsy / Berta | 4 episodes |
| 2017 | Criminal Minds | Janel Desmond | Episode: "Blue Angel" |
| 2018 | The Middle | Mrs. Jodie Kozicki | Episode: "The Crying Game" |
| 2019 | Grace and Frankie | Audrey | Episode: "The Pharmacy" |
| 2019 | Better Things | Ida | Episode: "No Limits" |
| 2019 | Bless This Mess | Linda | 2 episodes |
| 2020 | Saved by the Bell | Ms. Mandrake | 2 episodes |
| 2021–2026 | Hacks | Josefina | Recurring role |
| 2022 | Call Me Kat | Mary | Episode: "Call Me Forty" |
| 2022 | Celebrity Family Feud | Herself | Episode: "Abbott Elementary vs. Hacks" |
| 2022 | Reboot | Selma | Recurring role |
| 2022 | Ghosts | Paula | 2 episodes (Later would reprise her role in a May 2026 episode) |
| 2022–2023 | Beavis and Butt-Head | Mrs. Ortiz | 2 episodes |
| 2023 | NCIS: Los Angeles | Special Agent Daisy Van Zant | Episode: "Maybe Today" |
| 2024 | St. Denis Medical | Debbie | Episode: "A Peanut and Caramel-Filled Miracle" |
| 2026–present | Eternally Yours | Phyllis | Main role |

== Awards and nominations ==
| Award | Year | Category | Nominated work | Result | Ref. |
|---|---|---|---|---|---|
| Actor Awards | 2022 | Outstanding Performance by an Ensemble in a Comedy Series | Hacks | Nominated | |
| Actor Awards | 2025 | Outstanding Performance by an Ensemble in a Comedy Series | Hacks | Nominated | |
