= Kyle Massey =

American actor (born 1991)

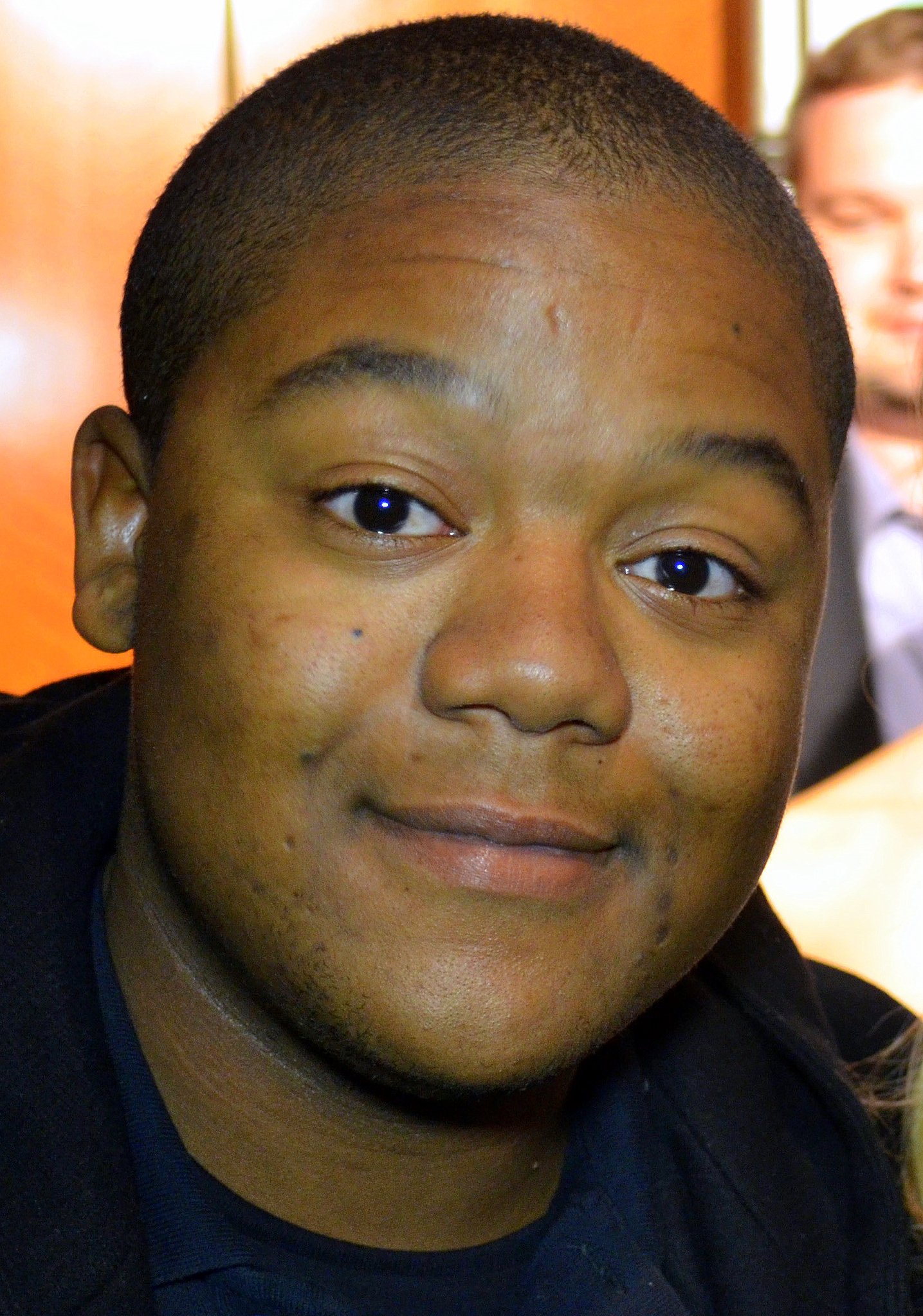
- Massey in 2012
- Born: Kyle Orlando Massey; August 28, 1991 (age 35); Atlanta, Georgia, U.S.
- Occupations: Actor; rapper
- Years active: 1999–2021
- Television: That's So Raven, Cory in the House, Life Is Ruff, Fish Hooks, Dancing with the Stars
- Partner: Hana Giraldo (engaged)
- Relatives: Christopher Massey (brother)
- Musical career
- Genres: Hip hop; R&B; electronic
- Labels: Walt Disney; Hollywood

Kyle Orlando Massey (born August 28, 1991), also known mononymously as Massey, is an American former actor and rapper. He starred in the Disney Channel sitcoms That's So Raven and its spin-off Cory in the House, in which he played Cory Baxter. In 2005, Massey starred in the Disney Channel Original Movie Life Is Ruff. He has released several rap songs for Walt Disney Records and Hollywood Records. He also provided the voice of Milo in the Disney animated series Fish Hooks and was the runner-up on the 11th season of ABC's Dancing with the Stars.

== Career ==
=== Acting ===
Massey played Cory Baxter, the younger brother to Raven-Symoné’s character Raven, in the Disney Channel show That's So Raven for four seasons, and then headlined its 2007 spin-off Cory in the House. Massey also starred in the 2005 Disney Channel Original Movie Life Is Ruff. He later voiced the character of a fish named Milo on the Disney Channel series Fish Hooks. Additionally, Massey played PJ Watson in three episodes of the PBS children's educational series The Electric Company.

=== Music ===
Massey appeared on the Disney Channel Holiday soundtrack and the Shaggy Dog soundtrack where he performed "Who Let the Dog Out" and "Jingle Bells (a Hip-Hop Carol)". He rapped in the music video for Disney's "Underdog" and "It's a Dog" from the Life Is Ruff soundtrack. Additionally, he performed the theme song for Cory in the House and Yin Yang Yo!. Massey and his brother Christopher Massey have also performed rap as the duo, The Massey Boyz.

In 2015, Massey opened a SoundCloud account, where he uploaded new original music, with his latest song being "Finess". On June 12, 2016, Massey was featured using his surname as a mononym on the song "Verse" by Lebanese-American rapper Skate. The collaboration marked Massey's first official musical release in nearly a decade.

=== Dancing with the Stars ===
Massey was a contestant on the 11th season of Dancing with the Stars, which premiered on September 20, 2010. He and his professional partner Lacey Schwimmer finished as the runners-up in the competition. Massey's final dance was a freestyle to the song "Tootsie Roll" by the 69 Boys. He was praised by all the judges, being dubbed the "Fresh Prince of DWTS".

In 2012, Massey and Schwimmer appeared in the Dancing with the Stars live show in Las Vegas, Nevada.

Week #	Dance/Song	Judges' score			Result
Week #	Dance/Song	Inaba	Goodman	Tonioli	Result
1	Cha Cha Cha/"My First Kiss"	8	7	8	Last to be called Safe
2	Quickstep/"(If You're Wondering If I Want You To) I Want You To"	8	7	7	Safe
3	Waltz/"Falling in Love at a Coffee Shop"	8	7	8	Safe
4	Rumba/"Nothin' on You"	6/8	6/7	6/7	Safe
5	Foxtrot/"Charlie's Angels Theme"	8	5	7	Safe
6	Tango/"If I Had You"; Rock n' Roll Marathon/"La Grange"	8 Awarded	7; 7	8 Points	Safe
7	Cha Cha Cha Team Dance/"Workin' Day and Night"; Paso Doble/"Free Your Mind"	8; 9	8; 8	8; 8	Last to be called Safe
8	Viennese Waltz/"Breathe (2 AM)"; Jive/"Good Golly Miss Molly"	9; 10	9; 9	9; 10	Safe
9 Semi-finals	Samba/"She's Got Me Dancing"; Argentine Tango/"Jai Ho"	10; 10	9; 9	10; 10	Safe
10; Finals	Foxtrot/"Feeling Good"; Freestyle/"Tootsee Roll"; Tango/"If I Had You"; Cha Cha Cha/"Raise Your Glass"	9; 10; 9; 9	9; 9; 8; 9	9; 10; 9; 10	Runner-up

== Personal life ==
Massey is the younger brother of actor Christopher Massey, who played Michael Barret in the television series Zoey 101. Their mother is Angel Massey.

On March 14, 2025, it was reported Massey got engaged with his long-time girlfriend, Hana Giraldo, daughter of Pat Benatar and Neil Giraldo.

=== Assault by Lil Twist ===
In March 2015, rapper Lil Twist was arrested and charged with several crimes after he and four others assaulted Massey and his brother Christopher. On December 1, 2016, Twist pleaded no contest to six charges and received a one-year jail sentence.

=== 2021 criminal charges ===
On June 29, 2021, Massey was charged in King County, Washington on one count of immoral communication with a minor, where he allegedly sent nude photos to a 13-year-old girl. The criminal charge came after a 2019 lawsuit whose allegations Massey denied, saying that the lawsuit was an extortion attempt, and that in early 2019 the attorneys representing the minor had demanded $1.5 million, threatening to go public with the allegation if he did not comply. The lawsuit also stated that Massey had known the accuser since she was four years old. This criminal charge followed a civil lawsuit filed in March 2019, which sought $1.5 million in damages for similar allegations. The civil case was dropped in December 2019 after the plaintiff's lawyer withdrew.

== Discography ==
- "It's a Dog" – Life Is Ruff (2005)
- "Yin Yang Yo! Theme Song" – Yin Yang Yo! (2006)
- "Cory in the House Theme Song" – Cory in the House (2007)
- "Underdog Raps" – Underdog: Original Soundtrack (2007)
- "Jingle Bells (A Hip Hop Carol)" – Disney Channel Holiday (2007)
- "Finess (featuring Skate)" – single (2016)

== Filmography ==
Film roles
Year	Title	Role	Notes
2011	Beethoven's Christmas Adventure	Henry	Direct-to-video
2014	Senior Project	Andy	
2017	Ripped	Young Reeves	
2018	That Tree Do Be Growin' - They Grew Up Next to Each Other but He Never Noticed the Tree	Terrance Who Never Notices the Tree (Ages 12 to 85)	Independent Film Based on Bennington College Original and Anonymous Student Theater Production with Same Name
2018	Bad Company	Mack	Direct-to-video
2021	Dutch	Teen Quan	Direct-to-video

Television roles
Year	Title	Role	Notes
1999	Selma, Lord, Selma	Featured	Television film; as Kyle Orlando Massey
1999	Passing Glory	Principal/Dancer	Television film; as Kyle Orlando Massey
2001	The Parkers	Kevin	Episode: "Crazy Love"
2002	That Was Then	Classroom Kid	Episode: "The Thirty-Year Itch"
2002	The District	Ronde	Episode: "Resurrection"
2002	Becker	Kid	Episode: "The Grand Gesture"
2003–2007	That's So Raven	Cory Baxter	Main role (100 episodes)
2003	The Practice	Derrick Hayes	Episode: "Capitol Crimes"
2005	Life Is Ruff	Calvin Wheeler	Disney Channel Original Movie
2006–2007	American Dragon: Jake Long	Huntsboy #88	Recurring voice role
2007–2008	Cory in the House	Cory Baxter	Lead role (34 episodes)
2008	Yin Yang Yo!	Chad 3000 (voice)	Episode: "Skirting the Issue/Moon Over My Yinny"
2010	The Electric Company	P.J. Watson	Recurring role
2010–2014	Fish Hooks	Milo	Main voice role
2010	Dancing with the Stars	Himself	Contestant (season 11)
2014	Comedy Bang! Bang!	Thief	Episodes: "Patton Oswalt Wears a Black Blazer & Dress Shoes"
2014	Gotham	Mackey	Episodes: "Selina Kyle", "Lovecraft"
2015	Being Mary Jane	Cameron	Episodes: "Sleepless in Atlanta", "No Eggspectations"
2016–2018	Mighty Magiswords	Mr. Spoony / various others	Recurring voice roles
2017	Celebrity Family Feud	Himself	Contestant; episode: "Jennie Garth vs. Kyle Massey"
2018	The Mind of Jake Paul	Himself	Cameo
2018–2020	Rise of the Teenage Mutant Ninja Turtles	Jeremy	Voice role
2021	Millenials	Omar	Main role (season 1)
