= Raven Baxter =

American science communicator and educator

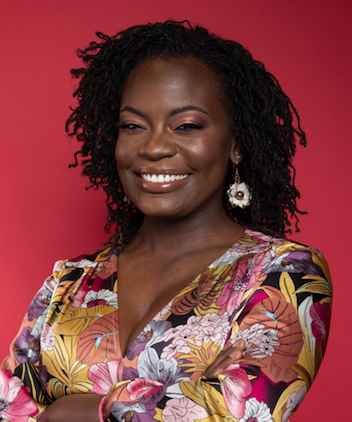
- Baxter in 2020
- Other name: Raven the Science Maven
- Education: Buffalo State College (B.S. 2014, M.A. 2016), University at Buffalo (Ph. D. 2021)
- Employer(s): Buffalo Public Schools, Erie Community College
- Website: www.thesciencemaven.com

Raven Baxter is an American science communicator and STEM educator. Baxter began posting science education videos on social media under the username Raven the Science Maven in 2017.

== Education ==
Baxter completed bachelor's and master's degrees in biology at Buffalo State College in 2014 and 2016, respectively. In 2021, she earned her Ph.D. in curriculum, instruction, and the science of learning from the University at Buffalo, and was awarded the SUNY Chancellor's Award for Student Excellence. Her dissertation was titled "Culturally responsive Science Communication: The messengers, messages, and voices in communicating science through Hip-Hop".

== Career ==
While pursuing her master's degree, Baxter worked as a substitute teacher in Buffalo Public Schools. She went on to work at AMRI Global in drug discovery following her Master's program and recounted her experiences working as a Black woman in science research in a Mother Jones article. Baxter also taught as an assistant professor of biology at Erie Community College, an experience which she says changed her career path. While completing her Ph.D. program, Baxter worked as an academic adviser at Buffalo State. She trained as a molecular biologist, and has researched the evolution of structure and function of protein chaperones, which is when molecules lead new proteins to their right place in a protein chain. Baxter was invited to give the opening keynote at SciComm2020. Following her tweet floating an idea for a Dirty Jobs spin-off called "Nerdy Jobs", Baxter was contacted by fellow science communicator and Crash Course host Hank Green with an offer to fund a pilot. Also in 2020, Baxter was recognized as an emerging leader in the field of healthcare, when USA Fortune Magazine named her to their "40 Under 40 in Health".

Baxter launched a STEM-themed apparel line called Smarty Pants Clothing in January 2021. She presented at the RTI Fellows Program Distinguished Lecture Series on leadership and communication in 2021. Also in 2021, Baxter organized the #BlackInSciCom Twitter hashtags as part of her #BlackInX initiative to increase visibility of Black scientists. She partnered with the National Center for Science Education (NCSE) during Earth Week 2021 to create a series of videos to educate students about climate change.

In 2022, Baxter was recognized as an Ebony Magazine Power 100 Trailblazer in STEM, by Forbes Magazine among their "30 Under 30" in Science for her science communication, in particular through rapping, and with a Woman of Distinction Award from the American Association of University Women.

As of 2024, she works remotely for Mount Sinai Hospital of New York.

== Music ==
In 2017, Baxter began publishing science education videos under the moniker "Raven the Science Maven." Baxter has used her social media platform to counter misinformation around COVID-19 and vaccines. In 2021, she released "Big Ole Geeks," a parody of Megan Thee Stallion's hit "Big Ole Freak". "Wipe It Down," Baxter's parody of Lil Boosie's "Wipe Me Down," contained information and safety tips related to the COVID-19 pandemic. Baxter's "The Antibody Song", a parody of Megan Thee Stallion's "Body", went viral. In response to one controversial tweet made by Nicki Minaj on side effects of vaccines, Baxter shared a rap song she made on how vaccines work.

== Personal life ==
In May 2024, while she was in the process of buying a condo in Virginia Beach, Baxter's broker informed her that the seller rescinded the agreement because she learned that Baxter was Black. Baxter shared the news on Twitter, and following advice of commenters, filed discrimination claims with the Virginia Fair Housing Office and the US Department of Housing and Urban Development. Baxter's broker later said that the seller changed her mind, and The New York Times reported that the sale was set to close later in the summer.

== Awards ==
- 2022 Woman of Distinction Award from the American Association of University Women
- Ebony Magazine Power 100 Trailblazer in STEM
- 2022 Named to Forbes Magazine's 30 Under 30 in Science
- 2020 Named to Fortune Magazine's 40 Under 40 in Health
- 2018 Arthur A. Schomburg Fellowship, the University at Buffalo
