= T'Keyah Crystal Keymáh =

American actress, singer (born 1962)

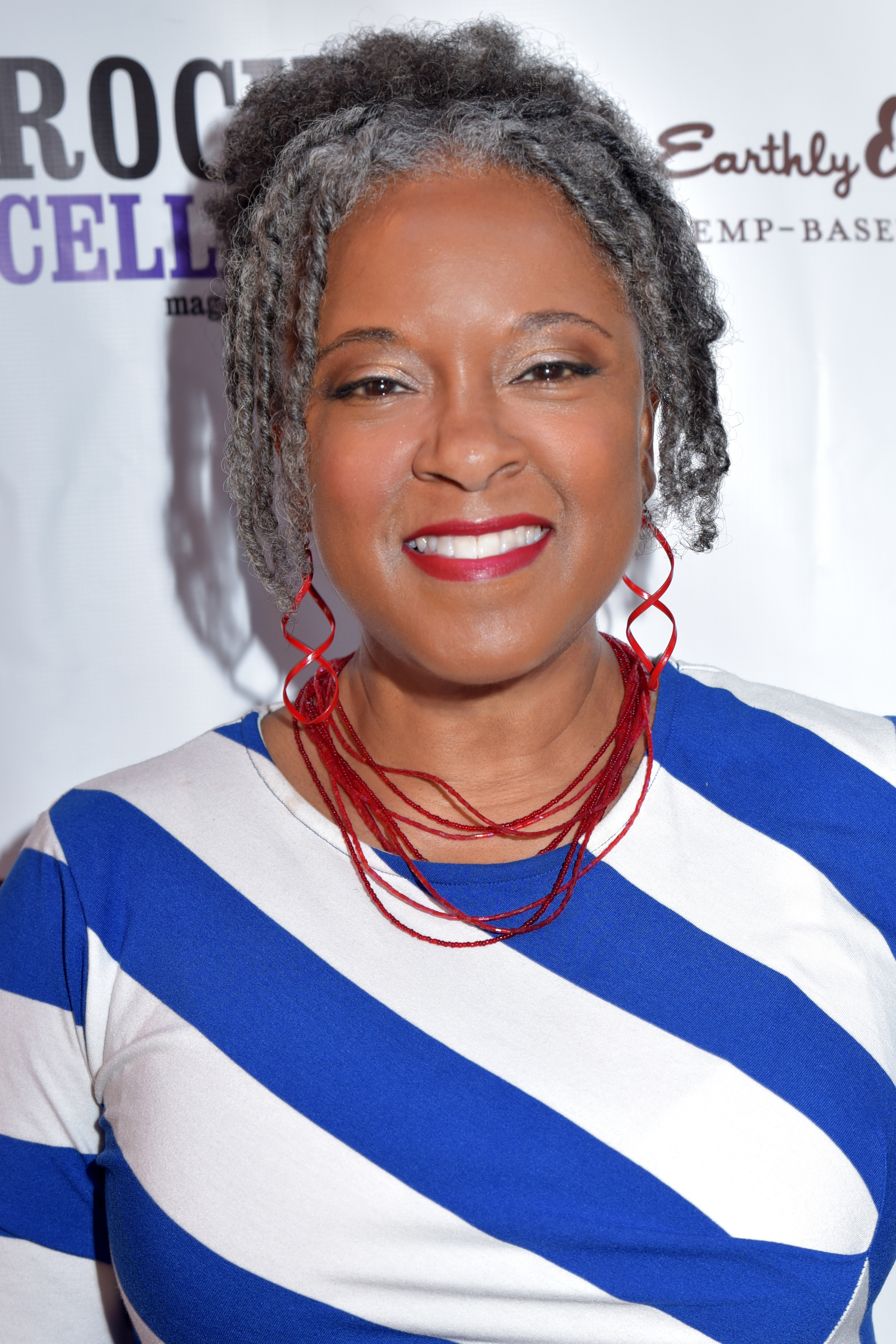
- Keymáh in July 2019
- Born: Crystal Walker; October 13, 1962 (age 63); Chicago, Illinois, U.S.
- Education: Florida A&M University
- Occupations: Actress; singer
- Years active: 1982–present
- Known for: In Living Color; Cosby; That's So Raven
- Awards: 2012 – TV Land Groundbreaking Show Award (In Living Color)
- Website: www.tkeyah.com

T'Keyah Crystal Keymáh (born Crystal Walker; October 13, 1962) is an American actress and singer. In addition to her status as an original cast member of the Fox sketch comedy series In Living Color (1990–1994), Keymáh is also known for her roles as Erica Lucas on the CBS sitcom Cosby (1996–2000), Tanya Baxter on the Disney Channel sitcom That's So Raven (2003–2005), and as the star and host on the Keymáh Network sketch variety show The Cool Crystal Show (2020–present).

== Early life ==
Born Crystal Walker on October 13, 1962, in Chicago, Illinois, at Cook County Hospital, Keymáh was raised Catholic on the city's South Side. Her mother, Arlene Carter, a student at Chicago State University, died when Keymáh was two years old. Keymáh's father, William Walker Sr., was an Illinois State Police trooper. He is of Seminole Indian descent from Springfield, Illinois. Keymáh was raised by her maternal grandparents Mary Louis Zeno, a social worker for the Illinois public aid department, and Carneil Carter, an insurance salesperson with Metropolitan Insurance. Keymáh began entertaining her family – singing, dancing, and reciting original poems and stories — at the age of three. Keymáh wrote her first play and her first song in elementary school. Keymáh then went on to go to Academy of Our Lady where she graduated from in 1981. Keymáh performed with Ali LeRoi and Lance Crouther in the Mary Wong Comedy Group in high school, and then enrolled in Florida A&M University’s School of Business and Industry. In 1988, she adopted the stage name "T'Keyah Crystal Keymáh" after realizing her last name, Walker, reflected a slave name rather than her African roots. In a 1991 interview with the Chicago Tribune, she claimed that "T'Keyah" meant "mental revival of God's spirit" and that "Keymáh" meant "to establish oneself" in Hebrew but neither name appears to be of Hebrew origin by modern day findings."

== Career ==
During college and after graduation, Keymáh taught theater, dance, and mime. She has also done many theater performances, and produced and directed films. One of the original cast members of Fox Television's Emmy winning variety show, In Living Color, for five seasons Keymáh played a number of characters, including Cryssy, the central character of her self-written signature piece, "In Black World". She also sang and danced on the show. After In Living Color, she played contractor Scotti Decker in On Our Own; played comedy show writer Denise Everett on the 1996 TV series The Show; and provided the voices for Roz, Shavonne, Aki, Mrs. LaSalle, and many others in Waynehead. For four years, Keymáh was a series regular on Cosby, where she played flight attendant-lawyer-pastry chef-teacher Erica Lucas Hall. Following Cosby, she appeared for three seasons on the Disney series That's So Raven as Raven's mother, Tanya Baxter. In season four, her character was written out of the plot so that Keymáh could care for her ailing grandmother. Keymáh co-wrote and costarred in a two-person stage show with music, called Sellout!?!, with fellow College alumnus Bryan C. Jones, who was also one of the many guests to appear in her hit variety show T'Keyah Live! On June 21, 2022, Entertainment Tonight announced that Keymáh would reprise her role as Tanya Baxter on the That's So Raven spin-off, Raven's Home.

=== The Cool Crystal Show characters ===
- Nzinghi Anyemeechi Mbweli Aharanwa (Cooking with the Queen)
- Mrs. Dr. Eliza Madree Weaver (Read to Me)
- Jett
- Stand up T'Keyah (Standup Tragedy)
- Nylah
- The Sisters
- Dr. Melanie Milan (The Milan Medical Moment)
- Miss Louise and Miss Ethel ("Ladies on the Porch")
- Mr. Z and Mr. Washington ("Men on the Porch")

=== In Living Color characters ===
- Cryssy (Black World)
- Hilda Hedley (Hey Mon)
- LaShawn
- Leslie Livingston (Homey the Clown)
- Mrs. Buttman (The Buttmans)
- Shawanda Harvey, host of Go on Girl

=== In Living Color impressions ===
- Shahrazad Ali
- Anita Baker
- Whoopi Goldberg
- Pam Grier
- Jackée Harry
- Janet Jackson
- La Toya Jackson
- Eartha Kitt
- Joie Lee
- Diana Ross
- Jean Stapleton (as Edith Bunker (All in the Family))
- Barbra Streisand

=== Other impressions ===
- Nell Carter
- Ruby Dee
- Macy Gray
- Katharine Hepburn
- Billie Holiday
- Harry Lennix
- Johnny Mathis
- Sidney Poitier
- Nancy Wilson

=== Don't Get Me Started! ===
Keymáh performed a solo stage work titled Don't Get Me Started! She sang, performed impressions, and talked about the prison industrial complex as well as conspiracy theories. She debuted the show in 2011 at The Black Academy of Art & Letters (TBAAL) in Dallas, Texas.

=== T'Keyah Live! ===
T'Keyah Live! is a variety show and is Keymáh's third self-produced theatrical show. She has performed the show across the U.S. since 1999 with a number of different guest performers, including Todd Bridges, T. C. Carson, Ralph Harris, Dawnn Lewis, and Karen Malina White.

=== Some of My Best Friends ===
Some of My Best Friends is a series of monologues in verse and prose embodied by a dozen diverse but somehow connected characters. In this humorous, tear jerking, thought-provoking theatrical production, Keymáh champions societal issues that are as relevant today as they were when the show debuted to sold out crowds at Chicago's South Shore Cultural Center in 1991. Overcoming obstacles, the devastation of AIDS, the search for love, race relations, and teen promiscuity are just some of the topics explored. The show was chiefly penned by Keymáh but includes pieces written by or in collaboration with Ali LeRoi, Harry Lennix, and poet Angela Jackson (And All These Roads Be Luminous: Poems Selected and New); and includes a dance choreographed by Maurice Hines. About her work in this show critics have said: "Keymáh is a Charismatic Actress... Chameleonic and Effervescent" – Los Angeles Times;"...Beyond Superlatives; She's Phenomenal!" – Earl Calloway, Chicago Defender; "Much More Than Comedy"- Lisa M. Pancia, New York Vignette; "...a Delightful, Multitalented Performer whose ability to create believable characters on stage is a Wonder to Behold"- Nat Colley, Los Angeles Reader; "Keymáh is Magnificent" – Linda Armstrong, Amsterdam News;"...Keymáh's Poignant, Detailed Portrayals are Never Less Than Magnificent"- Randy Trabitz, Los Angeles Weekly. The show garnered an AUDELCO Award nomination for Best Solo Performer, an NAACP Theatre Award nomination for Best Writing, and NAACP Theatre Awards for Best Performance and Best Play.

== Personal life ==
Keymáh is an avid gardener and a vegetarian, as well as an active, Golden Life Member of Delta Sigma Theta sorority. She was initiated into the Beta Alpha chapter at Florida Agricultural and Mechanical University. Keymáh's brother is former Commander of the DC US Army National Guard, current Sergeant at Arms of the United States House of Representatives, the Honorable Major General William J. Walker.

Keymáh self-published three books: Cycle of Love: 28 Days of Organization, Rejuvenation and Meditation for Inspired Self Care, an inspirational self-help book with recipes, exercises and meditations; Some of My Best Friends: A Collection of Characters, the book version of the stage show she performed for ten years; and Natural Woman / Natural Hair: A Hair Journey – Hairstyles and Hairstories from the Front with Simple, Step-by-Step Instructions on Taking Care of your Natural Hair, an instructional hair care manual with anecdotes about her experiences with Afro-textured hair. She also contributed essays to "The HBCU Experience Book," "Dining with the Ancestors: When Heroes Come to Dinner," and "The Burden: African Americans and the Enduring Impact of Slavery."

== Legacy ==
Musical artist Flyy Moon pays tribute to Keymáh's iconic "In Black World" performance piece, by including the opening lines in the intro of her 2021 debut song release, "Black." Associated Black Charities operates a donor-advised Keymáh Cultural Fund, which provides tickets to youth groups to attend theatrical performances and funds artistic groups that serve or comprise teens and children. There is a theater scholarship named for Keymáh at her alma mater, Florida A&M University. and medical scholarship named for her at Meharry Medical College.

== Educator ==
T'Keyah Crystal Keymáh served as a K–8 substitute teacher for the Chicago Board of Education for 4 years. She has presented her "Tools of the Trade" actors preparation workshops at theatre festivals and other events in the United States, and she has lectured abroad. In the fall of 2017, Keymáh served as Florida A&M University's first ever W.K. Kellogg Foundation Artist-in-Residence in the College of Social Sciences, Arts, and Humanities Theatre department. Her residency included directing Pearl Cleage's The Nacirema Society Requests Your Presence at a Celebration of Their First 100 Years, teaching an Acting for the Camera course, and providing industry workshops and mentoring students.

== Filmography ==
=== Film ===
Year	Title	Role	Notes
1985	The Miss Black America Pageant	Contestant	Miss Illinois and 1st runner up for Miss Black America
1987	Big Shots	Secretary	Uncredited
1995	Tales from the Hood	Nurse Parchman	Uncredited
1997	Jackie Brown	Raynelle	
2000	Tweety's High-Flying Adventure	Aoogah	Voice, uncredited
2001	The Gilded Six Bit	Missy Mae	Short film
2004	The Creature of the Sunny Side Up Trailer Park	Tonya	
2012	Lost Angels	Hadassah	Short film
2012	Daughter of Fortune	Vogel Peterson	Short film
2014	Unsolved	Margaret Hanes	Short film
2015	Bail	Gladys/Bobbie	Short film
2015	Chi-Raq	Lorde	
2016	Instance	Ms. Kaplan	Short film
2015	What Happened Last Night?	Beverly	
2018	Revival	Rebah	
2020	Patsy Lee & The Keepers of the 5 Kingdoms	Lorraine	
2020	Ungubani	Moms	Short film
2020	For Prophet	Dr. Sharon Fisher	
2024	Patsy Lee & The Keepers of the 5 Kingdoms	Lorraine	

=== Television ===
Year	Title	Role	Notes
1990–1994	In Living Color	Various	Series regular - 140 episodes
1992	Quantum Leap	Paula	Episode: "A Song for the Soul - April 7, 1963"
1993	Roc	Darrelle	Episode: "Ebony and Ivory"
1993-1997	Soul Train	Herself - Guest Host	2 episodes
1994	The Commish	Grace Caldwell	Episode: "Born in the USA"
1994–1995	The John Larroquette Show	Sara	2 episodes
1995	On Our Own	Scotti Decker	Series regular - 7 episodes
1996–2000	Cosby	Erica Lucas	Series regular - 94 episodes Nominated—NAACP Image Award for Outstanding Supporting Actress in a Comedy Series (1998–99)
1996	Waynehead	Roz, Shavonne	Voice, main role
1996	The Show	Denise Everett	Series regular - 8 episodes
1998	Pinky and the Brain	Singer	Voice, episode: "Inherit the Wheeze"
1999	Pinky, Elmyra & the Brain	Nurse Gland	Voice, episode: "Mr. Doctor"
2000	Happily Ever After: Fairy Tales for Every Child	Grandmother / Robber Girl	Voice, episode: "The Snow Queen"
2000–2001	Batman Beyond	Old Woman, Makeba, Dispatch Operator	3 episodes
2002–2003	Static Shock	Allie Langford / Nails, Teen Girl #1	Voice, 2 episodes
2003–2005	That's So Raven	Tanya Baxter	Series regular - 50 episodes (Seasons 1–3)
2004	My Wife and Kids	Realtor	Episode: "Moving on Out"
2004–2005	Teen Titans	Bumblebee	Voice, 4 episodes
2005–2006	American Dragon: Jake Long	Various	Voice, 3 episodes
2007–2008	Jury Duty	Herself	5 episodes
2013	Let's Stay Together	Dr. Blair Riley	2 episodes
2016	Sharknado: The 4th Awakens	Tech Terry @ Astro X	Television film
2017	There's...Johnny!	Roz	Series Regular - 6 episodes
2018	Kidding	Amika	Episode: "Pusillanimous"
2020	Two Degrees	T'Keyah	Episode: "Dessert & Down From There"
2020-2021	The Cool Crystal Show	Host / Various	Series Regular - 7 episodes
2022	Raven's Home	Tanya Baxter	Episode: "Bridge Over Troubled Daughter"

=== Video games ===
Year	Title	Role	Notes
2006	Teen Titans	Bumblebee	
