= That's So Raven =

American television sitcom (2003–2007)

- Genre: Teen sitcom; Fantasy
- Created by: Michael Poryes; Susan Sherman
- Starring: Raven-Symoné; Orlando Brown; Kyle Massey; Anneliese van der Pol; T'Keyah Crystal Keymáh; Rondell Sheridan
- Theme music composer: John Coda
- Opening theme: "That's So Raven" by Raven-Symoné and Orlando Brown
- Ending theme: "That's So Raven" (instrumental)
- Composer: John Coda
- Country of origin: United States
- Original language: English
- No. of seasons: 4
- No. of episodes: 100 (list of episodes)

Production
- Executive producers: Michael Poryes; Sean McNamara; David Brookwell; Dennis Rinsler; Marc Warren
- Producers: Walter Barnett; Patty Gary Cox; Raven-Symoné
- Cinematography: Alan Keath Walker
- Editors: Bill Lowe; David Schulman
- Running time: 23 minutes
- Production companies: It's a Laugh Productions (Note: Uncredited); Brookwell McNamara Entertainment (seasons 1–3); That So Productions (season 4); Warren & Rinsler Productions (season 4)

Original release
- Network: Disney Channel
- Release: January 17, 2003 – November 10, 2007

Related
- Cory in the House (2007–2008); Raven's Home (2017–2023)

That's So Raven is an American fantasy teen sitcom that was created by Michael Poryes and Susan Sherman, and aired on Disney Channel for four seasons between January 2003 and November 2007. The series centers on Raven Baxter (Raven-Symoné), a teenager with hidden psychic abilities. Episodes show Raven experiencing visions of future events; she must also deal with the social and personal issues of her youth. Raven often misinterprets the events she foresees, and intervenes to prevent a vision from coming true or to protect her friends and family, although her intervention often causes the vision to come true. She uses her skills in fashion design to create elaborate disguises she wears during these schemes. Raven's secret is shared with her best friends, Eddie Thomas (Orlando Brown) and Chelsea Daniels (Anneliese van der Pol), along with her brother, Cory (Kyle Massey), and parents, Tanya (T'Keyah Crystal Keymáh) and Victor (Rondell Sheridan). The series explores supernatural elements, family, friendship, and adolescence.

The Walt Disney Company created the series as its television network's first multi-camera sitcom after the success of its earlier single-camera comedy series such as Even Stevens and Lizzie McGuire, the former of which executive producers David Brookwell and Sean McNamara concurrently worked on. Their joint company Brookwell McNamara Entertainment produced That's So Raven, which premiered on January 17, 2003. The series concluded on November 10, 2007, after becoming the first program on the network to reach 100 episodes, and ended because the actors were aging beyond the show's target teenage demographic. All four seasons of the show have been distributed through digital download and on the streaming service Disney+.

That's So Raven enjoyed high viewership on broadcast television in the United States, and gave rise to the development of merchandise, soundtrack albums, and video game adaptations. Television critics praised Raven-Symoné for her physical comedy in what is considered her breakthrough role. The series received two Primetime Emmy Award nominations for Outstanding Children's Program in 2005 and 2007. A spin-off entitled Cory in the House, which stars Massey and Sheridan, aired on Disney Channel for two seasons from 2007 to 2008. Raven-Symoné, van der Pol, Sheridan and Keymáh reprised their roles for the spin-off Raven's Home, which aired for six seasons from 2017 to 2023.

== Premise ==
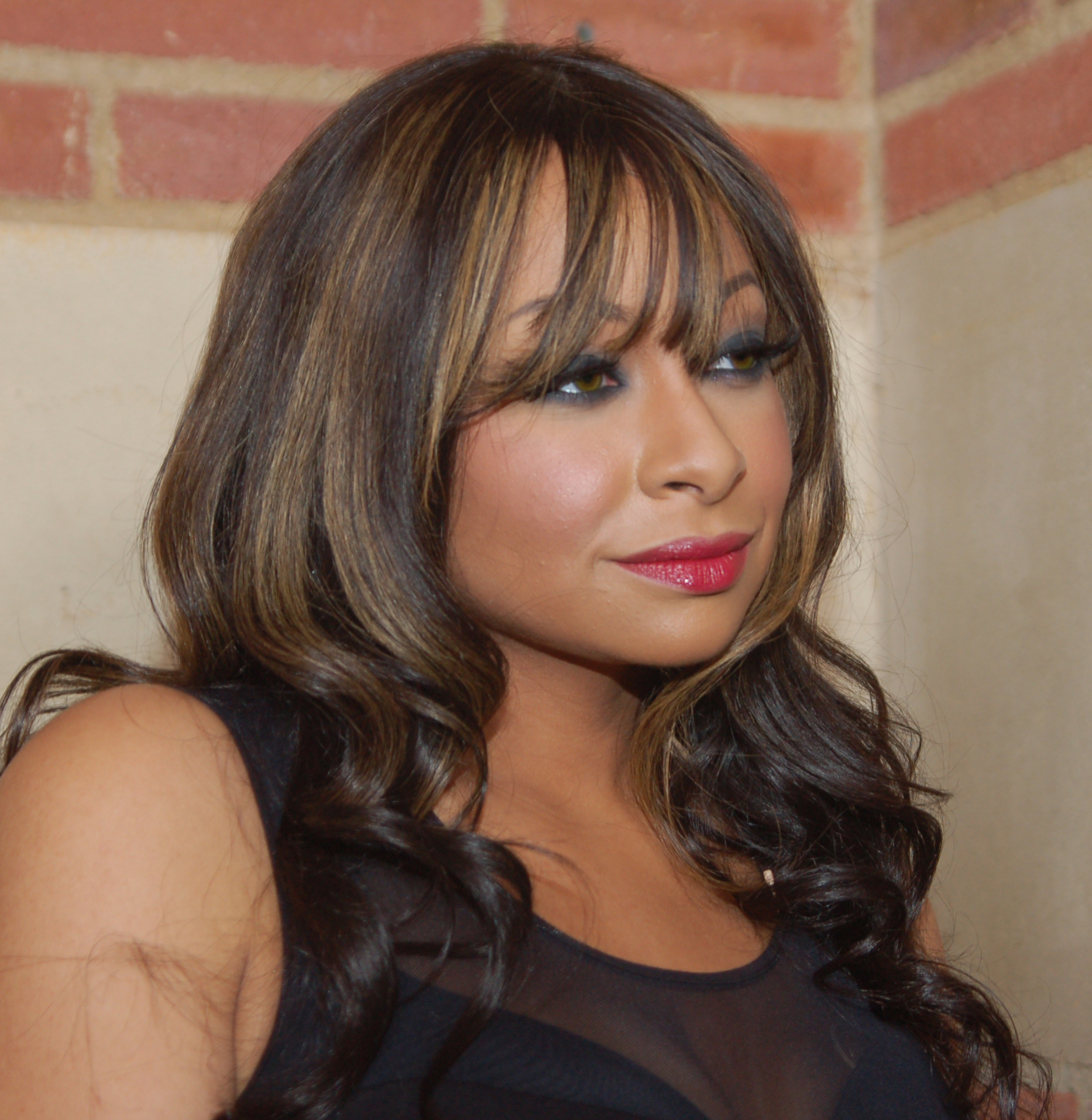
Raven-Symoné, pictured in 2010, serves as the program's central focus during its four-season run.

Raven Baxter is a high school student who has a secret psychic ability that allows her to experience short visions of future events. Often, she finds herself misinterpreting the events she sees, resulting in trouble for herself, her friends and family. Raven keeps her supernatural ability a secret; only her close friends and family are aware of it. Raven attends school alongside her best friends Chelsea, who is described as "ditzy", and is an environmentalist and an artist; and Eddie, who is an aspiring rapper, is athletic and plays on the school basketball team. Raven lives with her younger brother Cory, an aspiring businessperson, and her parents Victor and Tanya. Victor initially works in a restaurant as a chef, and in the second season he opens his own restaurant called "The Chill Grill". Tanya halted her studies to raise her family but decided to continue studying law once her children were older; after the third season, she leaves the family to study in England. Raven is an aspiring fashion designer who frequently creates costumes to disguise her identity; she often implements schemes to rectify a situation or her own mistakes. In the fourth season, the show's format is slightly revised; Raven works as an intern for the famous fashion designer Donna Cabonna.

The series explores the fantasy of wanting a supernatural power children may experience. It shares similarities with series such as Sabrina the Teenage Witch (1996–2003) and other fantasy television programs in which adolescents experience and learn to deal with miraculous abilities. Disney Channel president Rich Ross stated Raven's powers are not "dark" but rather a metaphorical representation of the unpredictability of future events. The series does not explore the origin or discovery of Raven's powers; however, her grandmother Vivian also has psychic powers. Raven often intervenes in situations to prevent a vision from coming true but she does not regularly try to control her ability or take advantage of it. Her visions sometimes represent a self-fulfilling prophecy. Many of the program's stories take place in the high-school setting.

== Production ==
=== Development ===
In the early 2000s, The Walt Disney Company's pay television network Disney Channel experienced success with single-camera comedy series Even Stevens (2000–2003) and Lizzie McGuire (2001–2004), and others that were also aimed at a pre-adolescent audience. That's So Raven was intended to appeal to a family audience while having a female character in the comedy lead role. Michael Poryes and Susan Sherman created the series. Sherman first conceived the idea of a buddy comedy for a pre-adolescent audience, and she and Poryes decided to base it around the idea of being able to see the future, which they thought would interest young viewers.

The creators pitched the concept to network executives under the working title The Future is On Me and later as Absolutely Psychic. Poryes said at her audition, Raven-Symoné read for the role of the lead character and for the comedic best-friend character Chelsea, and that she wanted to play Chelsea. Subsequently, a pilot episode in which she starred as the best friend rather than in the central role was filmed but after the test audience responded well to her and producers were impressed, the program was re-written with Raven-Symoné in the main role. Test audiences also responded favorably to the show's supernatural premise and its comedy. The series was also retitled That's So Raven. Poryes also served as an executive producer alongside David Brookwell and Sean McNamara, who concurrently produced Even Stevens for Disney Channel. Their joint company, Brookwell McNamara Entertainment produced the program in association with the network. That's So Raven became Disney Channel's first multi-camera sitcom. The series is centered on an African American family in a deliberate attempt to represent the diversity of the network's audience.

That's So Raven and Raven-Symoné's involvement as the titular character Raven were announced in a press release in November 2001. Twenty-one episodes were ordered for the first season, which began filming in Los Angeles, California, in the same month. The whole first season was filmed before the series began airing on television. That's So Raven was initially expected to premiere in the fall of 2002, however, the premiere broadcast of the series occurred on Friday, January 17, 2003. The broadcast included the first four episodes of the series.

=== Casting ===
Cast members (L-R, above): Kyle Massey, T'Keyah Crystal Keymáh, Rondell Sheridan, (below): Orlando Brown, Raven-Symoné and Anneliese van der Pol.

The program and its primary cast were announced in November 2001; Raven-Symoné was revealed to be portraying the titular character Raven; she had previously worked as a child actor on the sitcoms The Cosby Show and Hangin' with Mr. Cooper. Raven-Symoné was reported to be Disney's first African American female star, and the first African American woman to have her name in the title of a comedy series at the network. Joshua Alston of The A.V. Club called Raven-Symoné's role on the show her "most successful phase" and praised her physical comedy. Marsh cited her humor and commitment to comedy as a reason for her success. She is credited as "Raven" throughout the series.

The supporting cast was also first announced in November 2001. Orlando Brown portrays Raven's close friend Eddie and Anneliese van der Pol plays Chelsea, another of Raven's friends. Tricia Dixon was originally listed in the casting announcement before van der Pol joined the cast. Kyle Massey portrays Raven's younger brother, Cory. Rondell Sheridan portrays Raven's father, Victor.

T'Keyah Crystal Keymáh plays Raven's mother Tanya for the first three seasons; she left the show because she had initially expected to only work on three seasons as she was required to provide full-time care for her ailing grandmother. Within the show's storyline, it is explained Tanya has traveled to England to pursue higher education.

Guest stars in the series include Jenifer Lewis as Raven's grandmother Vivian and Anne-Marie Johnson as famous fashion designer Donna Cabonna in the show's fourth season.

=== Writing ===
Poryes believed it was important to write the scripts with honesty rather than talking down to the young audience. The writers endeavored to present meaningful stories to children, including lessons about friendship, but tried not to make the messages too "preachy". The series was written to reflect life as a typical teenager while also incorporating comedy, particularly through its central focus on physical humor. Van der Pol said the actors typically were not permitted to deviate from their scripted lines; however, Ross stated Raven-Symoné would improvise "comic bits". Alston described the show's nature as "goofy" with a "kid-friendly" comedy style, but also noted its complex stories revolving around "ethical challenges". The episodes did not typically air in the order of their production due to the lack of serialization in their stories.

=== Filming and conclusion ===
That's So Raven was recorded in front of a live studio audience in a set on a sound stage in Los Angeles. Filming of the first season began in November 2001. The series was filmed on two days each week and the child actors attended school on set. Prior to filming, the weekly schedule would also consist of script read-throughs, rewrites and rehearsals. A stunt coordinator was present for Raven-Symoné's slapstick and physical stunts.

The series was renewed for a second season in April 2003. Prior to the renewal, a musical episode of Even Stevens was aired in 2002; its success among the show's audience led network executives to ask Brookwell and McNamara to also produce a musical episode of That's So Raven. The musical episode of That's So Raven, entitled "The Road to Audition", was aired as part of the second season in July 2004. The success of the musical format on both Even Stevens and That's So Raven gave executives confidence in the appeal and interest of the musical genre, and inspired the development of the television film High School Musical.

While it was originally planned for a maximum of three seasons, in June 2005, That's So Raven was renewed for a fourth season, which would consist of 22 episodes and bring the program's total number of episodes to 100. The announcement marked the first time an original Disney Channel series would exceed three seasons and the first to reach 100 episodes for syndication. (Note: By August 2006, there were no plans to syndicate the show.) A film adaptation was also ordered to debut in 2007. Ross called That's So Raven the network's "most successful series". Production on the season was expected to begin in July and the episodes would be aired over the following two years.

Raven-Symoné became a producer on the show's fourth season at the age of 19; her roles included having input toward casting, scripts and special effects; however, she rejected the offer to direct an episode. Brookwell and McNamara departed the series at the end of the third season when their company was replaced with Warren & Rinsler Productions. An episode of the series was aired as part of the network crossover special That's So Suite Life of Hannah Montana, which was aired in July 2006 as a crossover of The Suite Life of Zack & Cody and Hannah Montana.

Production of the series finished in January 2006, and by August, president of Disney Channels Worldwide Gary Marsh stated it was unlikely any further episodes would be produced. Due to the heavy focus on high-school stories in the series, the network decided to end the show once the characters were beginning to age beyond their teenage years.

== Episodes ==
Season	Episodes	Originally released	
Season	Episodes	First released	Last released
1	21	January 17, 2003	March 5, 2004
2	22	October 3, 2003	September 24, 2004
3	35	October 1, 2004	January 16, 2006
4	22	February 20, 2006	November 10, 2007

== Reception ==
That's So Raven was reported to be the highest-rating original program in Disney Channel's history, a record previously held by Lizzie McGuire. In 2005 and 2007, the program's success led to two Primetime Emmy Awards nominations for Outstanding Children's Program. Alston said the success of That's So Raven led to Disney Channel changing its approach to original programming. He praised the chemistry between Raven-Symoné, Brown and van der Pol, which he attributed to their real-life friendships. Alston cited the episodes "A Goat's Tale" and "Out of Control" as the ones that best represent this dynamic. Raven-Symoné was widely recognized for her charisma and physical comedy in the series; Massey's "knack" for physical comedy was also praised.

In September 2026, clips from an April 2026 episode of Tea Time with Raven & Miranda, a podcast Raven-Symoné hosts with her wife, Miranda Pearman-Maday, resurfaced online. During the interview with internet personality Kalen Allen, the hosts discussed whether the title character was inherently Black, with Raven-Symoné arguing that changing the race of the show's main characters would diminish or alter its Black identity. Her comments drew criticism online, with some viewers arguing that they appeared to downplay the character's significance as a Black cultural figure. Fans also pointed to instances in which race was explicitly discussed on the series, as well as its predominantly Black cast, styling, and use of mannerisms and expressions that they considered reflective of Black culture.

=== Awards and nominations ===
List of awards and nominations received by That's So Raven
Award	Year	Recipient(s) and nominee(s)	Category	Result	Ref.
Artios Awards	2005	Joey Paul Jensen	Outstanding Achievement in Casting: Children's Television Series Programming	Won	
Artios Awards	2006	Joey Paul Jensen	Outstanding Achievement in Casting: Children's Television Series Programming	Nominated	
BET Awards	2004	Raven-Symoné	Outstanding Lead Actress in a Comedy Series	Nominated	
BET Awards	2004	That's So Raven	Outstanding Comedy Series	Nominated	
BET Awards	2005	Raven-Symoné	Outstanding Lead Actress in a Comedy Series	Nominated	
BET Awards	2005	That's So Raven	Outstanding Comedy Series	Nominated	
British Academy Children's Awards	2003	That's So Raven	International	Nominated	
Genesis Awards	2005	That's So Raven (for "A Goat's Tale")	Outstanding Children's Programming	Won	
Genesis Awards	2007	That's So Raven (for "Fur Better or Worse")	Outstanding Children's Programming	Nominated	
Gracie Awards	2004	That's So Raven	Outstanding Children/Adolescent Program	Won	
Gracie Awards	2005	Raven-Symoné	Outstanding Female Lead in a Comedy	Won	
NAACP Image Awards	2004	Raven-Symoné	Outstanding Performance in a Youth or Children's Series/Special	Won	
NAACP Image Awards	2005	Raven-Symoné	Outstanding Performance in a Youth or Children's Series/Special	Won	
NAACP Image Awards	2006	Raven-Symoné	Outstanding Performance in a Youth or Children's Series/Special	Won	
NAACP Image Awards	2006	Eric Dean Seaton	Outstanding Directing in a Comedy Series	Nominated	
NAACP Image Awards	2007	Kyle Massey	Outstanding Performance in a Youth or Children's Series/Special	Nominated	
NAACP Image Awards	2007	Raven-Symoné	Outstanding Performance in a Youth or Children's Series/Special	Won	
NAACP Image Awards	2007	Raven-Symoné	Outstanding Actress in a Comedy Series	Nominated	
NAACP Image Awards	2007	That's So Raven	Outstanding Children's Program	Won	
NAACP Image Awards	2008	Raven-Symoné	Outstanding Performance in a Youth or Children's Series/Special	Won	
NAACP Image Awards	2008	That's So Raven	Outstanding Children's Program	Won	
NAMIC Vision Awards	2004	Raven-Symoné	Best Comedic Performance	Nominated	
NAMIC Vision Awards	2004	That's So Raven (for "Dissin' Cousins")	Children's	Nominated	
NAMIC Vision Awards	2005	Raven-Symoné (for "He's Got the Power")	Best Comedic Performance	Nominated	
NAMIC Vision Awards	2005	That's So Raven (for "Road to Audition")	Children's	Nominated	
NAMIC Vision Awards	2006	Raven-Symoné	Best Comedic Performance	Nominated	
NAMIC Vision Awards	2006	That's So Raven	Best Children's	Nominated	
NAMIC Vision Awards	2007	Raven-Symoné	North Star Award	Won	
NAMIC Vision Awards	2007	That's So Raven (for "The Four Aces")	Best Children's	Won (Note: Also awarded to Lisa Knight and the Round Table.)	
NAMIC Vision Awards	2008	Raven-Symoné	Best Performance – Comedy	Nominated	
Nickelodeon Kids' Choice Awards	2004	Raven-Symoné	Favorite Television Actress	Won	
Nickelodeon Kids' Choice Awards	2005	Raven-Symoné	Favorite Television Actress	Won	
Nickelodeon Kids' Choice Awards	2006	Raven-Symoné	Favorite Television Actress	Nominated	
Nickelodeon Kids' Choice Awards	2006	That's So Raven	Favorite Television Show	Nominated	
Nickelodeon Kids' Choice Awards	2007	Raven-Symoné	Favorite Television Actress	Nominated	
Nickelodeon Kids' Choice Awards	2008	Raven-Symoné	Favorite Television Actress	Nominated	
Primetime Emmy Awards	2005	That's So Raven	Outstanding Children's Program	Nominated	
Primetime Emmy Awards	2007	That's So Raven	Outstanding Children's Program	Nominated	
Teen Choice Awards	2004	Raven-Symoné	Choice TV Actress: Comedy	Nominated	
Teen Choice Awards	2004	That's So Raven	Choice TV Show: Comedy	Nominated	
Teen Choice Awards	2005	Raven-Symoné	Choice TV Actress: Comedy	Nominated	
Teen Choice Awards	2005	That's So Raven	Choice TV Show: Comedy	Nominated	
Teen Choice Awards	2006	Raven-Symoné	Choice TV Actress: Comedy	Nominated	
Writers Guild of America Awards	2007	Deborah Swisher (for "Fur Better or Worse")	Children's Episodic & Specials	Nominated	
Young Artist Awards	2004	Kyle Massey	Best Performance in a TV Series (Comedy or Drama) – Leading Young Actor	Nominated	
Young Artist Awards	2004	Raven-Symoné	Best Performance in a TV Series (Comedy or Drama) – Leading Young Actress	Nominated	
Young Artist Awards	2005	Christopher Malpede	Best Performance in a Television Series – Guest Starring Young Actor	Won	
Young Artist Awards	2005	Raven-Symoné, Orlando Brown, Kyle Massey and Anneliese van der Pol	Outstanding Young Performers in a TV Series	Won	
Young Artist Awards	2005	Raven-Symoné	Michael Landon Award – Contribution to Youth Through Television	Won	
Young Artist Awards	2006	That's So Raven	Best Family Television Series (Comedy)	Nominated	
Young Artist Awards	2007	Kyle Massey	Best Performance in a TV Series (Comedy or Drama) – Leading Young Actor	Won	

== Other media ==
=== Home media ===
Four DVDs of the series, with selected episodes, had been released - titled Supernaturally Stylish, Disguise The Limit, Raven's House Party and Raven's Makeover Madness. Bonus features include music videos, a making-of featurette, a visual commentary, bloopers, trivia games and bonus episodes. While all four were released in the US, only the first two were released in the UK.

A DVD of That's So Suite Life of Hannah Montana, three crossover episodes of That's So Raven, The Suite Life of Zack & Cody and Hannah Montana, was released in the US and the UK. Bonus features including a That's So Raven trivia game, a Hannah Montana music video and a never-before-seen episode of The Suite Life of Zack & Cody.

=== Merchandising ===
That's So Raven became a successful merchandising franchise during its run; the show's merchandise includes a series of novels, dolls, board games, lunch boxes, jewelry, a fragrance and a clothing range. A line of video games was also developed; two games were released on the Game Boy Advance and That's So Raven: Psychic on the Scene was released on the Nintendo DS on November 2, 2006. Soundtrack albums That's So Raven (2004) and That's So Raven Too! (2006) feature recordings by some of the cast and guest performers. By 2006, merchandise based on the series had grossed over $400 million.

=== Spin-offs and adaptations ===
In 2005, Disney ordered a film adaptation of That's So Raven alongside the program's fourth-season renewal, which was planned for a 2007 release. Van der Pol said in 2010 a script for the film had been written but that Raven-Symoné was too busy to be involved at the time of development. The plot would have depicted Raven starting a fashion line with Eddie and Chelsea in France. The film did not enter production.

The network ordered a spin-off series entitled Cory in the House starring Massey and Sheridan in May 2006; this was the first time Disney Channel had developed a spin-off of an original series. The series depicts Cory and Victor moving to Washington, D.C., to live in the White House, where Victor begins work as the personal chef of a fictional President of the United States. The series aired for two seasons from 2007 to 2008.

Another spin-off, entitled Raven's Home, was first reported in October 2016; Raven-Symoné and van der Pol were both revealed to be reprising their roles as Raven and Chelsea, respectively. The series follows Raven as a divorced mother of children Booker, who has inherited Raven's psychic abilities, and Nia. Chelsea, also a divorced mother, moves in with Raven to raise her son Levi. Raven-Symoné is an executive producer on the series, which premiered on July 21, 2017. Sheridan is featured as a guest and returns as a regular character for the program's fifth season; Keymáh also guest-stars in the fifth-season finale. The sixth season premiered in April 2023. An Indian adaptation of the series entitled Palak Pe Jhalak premiered on Disney Channel in India in September 2015, and incorporates Indian culture and languages.
