= Jonathan W. Stokes =

American film producer

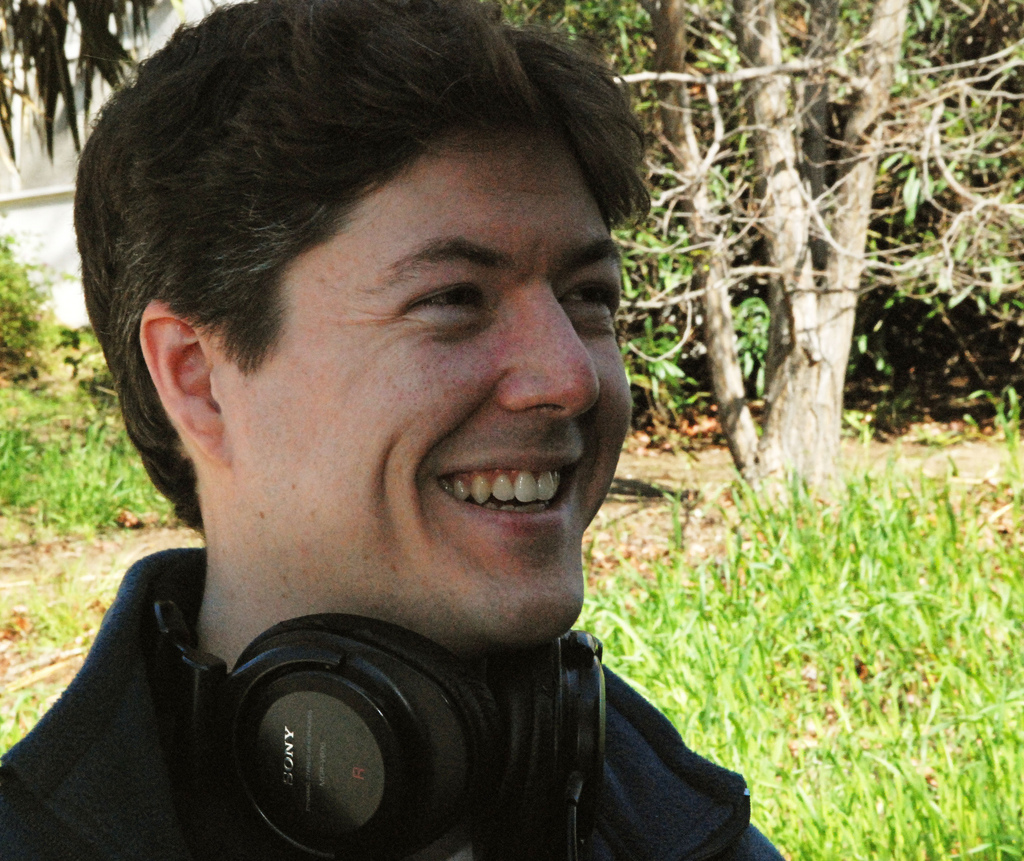
- Born: Manhattan, New York, US
- Occupations: Film director, screenwriter, producer
- Website: jonathanwstokes.com

Jonathan Witte Stokes is a film director, screenwriter, and producer. He is also an entrepreneur who created ValueWiki which was acquired by Wikia in 2010.

== Education ==
Stokes graduated from the Weston High School and majored in Philosophy at the Claremont Colleges. He then went on to study and perform improv and sketch comedy at the Upright Citizens Brigade Theatre, Improv Olympic and The Second City.

== Film career ==
Stokes has written scripts on assignment for actor-producers Will Smith, Jeremy Renner, and Hugh Jackman, as well as director-producer Ridley Scott. Stokes's script "Murders and Acquisitions" was purchased by Warner Brothers. Stokes' screenplay El Gringo was produced by Joel Silver and released in 2012. His script "Blood Mountain" was purchased with Academy Award winner Lawrence Bender producing, two time Academy Award nominee Sergei Bodrov attached to direct, and Benedict Cumberbatch attached to star. In 2020, Stokes's script "Murder in the White House" was purchased by Paramount Pictures with Neal Moritz producing. In 2021, Stokes sold his script "The Vampire Asset" to Code Entertainment.

Stokes is the author of the Addison Cooke series, published by Philomel Books at Penguin, and The Thrifty Guide to the Past series, published by Viking Press, also at Penguin.

Stokes is the only screenwriter to have five screenplays featured on the Black List, an annual survey of Hollywood executives' favorite screenplays.

Stokes wrote and directed The Last Hurrah starring Valerie Azlynn, Zack Bennett, Kate Micucci, Ravi Patel, and Randy Wayne, released in 2010. The movie is filmed in one continuous shot, and is considered representative of the mumblecore film movement in its improvisational feel and focus on dialog and Generation Y relationships. Stokes wrote and directed Wildcat starring Georgina Campbell, Mido Hamada, and Luke Benward, which was distributed by Saban Films in 2021.

Stokes also wrote and directed several short films, including Men, Interrupted (starring Janina Gavankar, Ravi Patel, Zack Bennett, and Jelynn Rodriguez), Wipe (starring Kelly Perine), Air (starring Greg Fellows and Brandon Scott), and "Victory" (starring Janina Gavankar and Kit Pongetti).

== Entrepreneur ==
Jonathan Stokes co-created ValueWiki.com in 2006 along with high school friend Zach Greenberger. The finance wiki, a "Wikipedia for stocks," grew to over 200,000 articles covering stocks and funds from 10 world wide stock exchanges before being acquired by Wikia in 2010 in a cash-and-stock deal.

== Filmography ==
| Year | Title | Notes |
|---|---|---|
| 2009 | Men, Interrupted | Director, writer, producer |
| 2009 | Wipe | Director, writer, producer |
| 2010 | The Last Hurrah | Director, writer, producer |
| 2010 | Air | Director, writer, executive producer |
| 2011 | Victory | Director, writer |
| 2011 | El Gringo | Writer |
| 2021 | Wildcat | Director, writer |
