= Murray D. Martin =

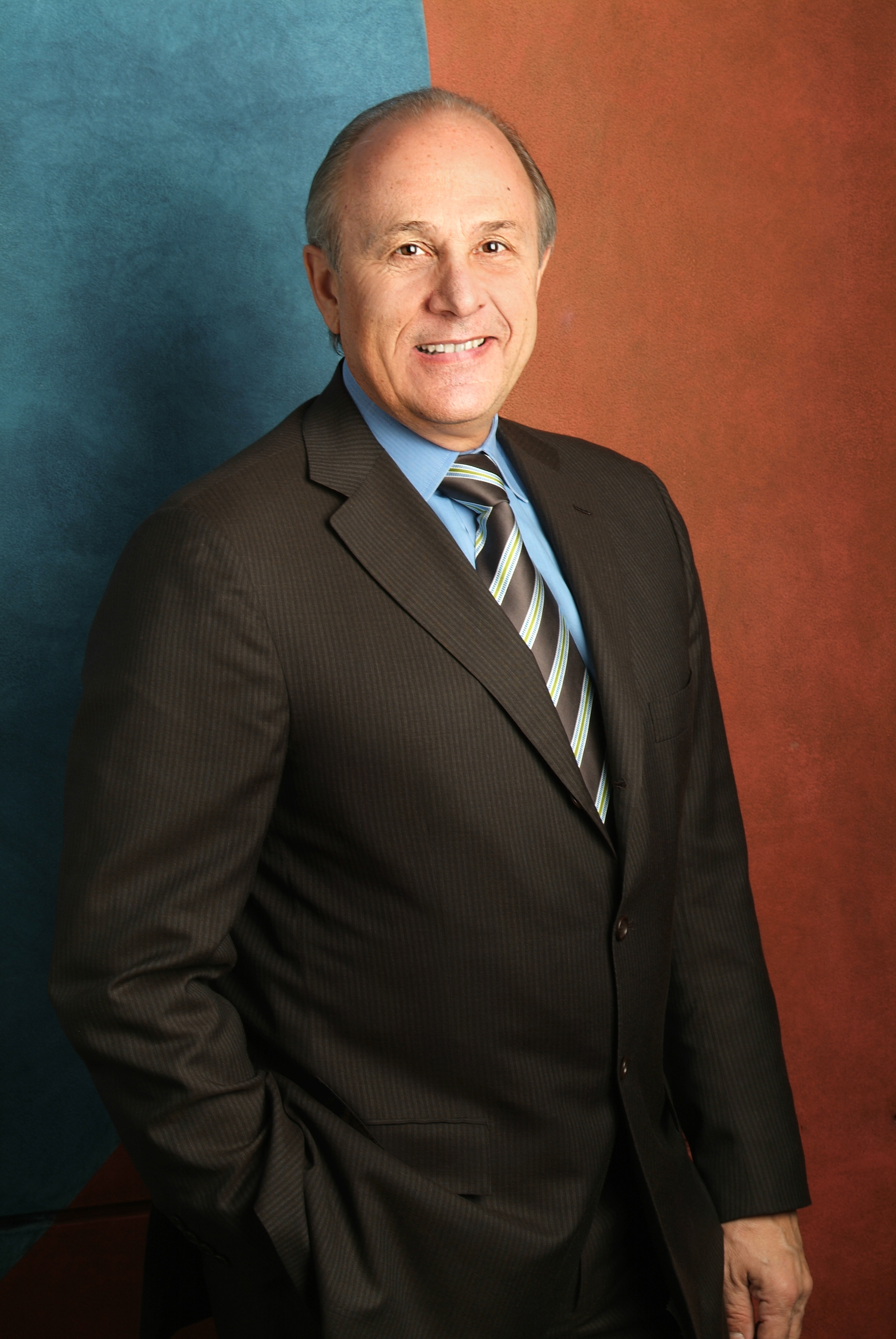

Chairman, President and CEO of Pitney Bowes
- Incumbent
- Assumed office May 14, 2007
- Preceded by: Michael J. Critelli

Personal details
- Born: December 11, 1947 (age 78) Hawkesville, Ontario, Canada
- Spouse: Ruth
- Children: 3

Murray D. Martin (born December 11, 1947) is and Canadian American business executive who was the former chairman, president and chief executive officer of the U.S.-based Pitney Bowes (NYSE). In 2007, he was appointed CEO to succeed Michael J. Critelli. Martin joined Pitney Bowes in 1987 and is best known for Pitney Bowes’ transformation from an American company selling goods and services into a global company.

== Early life and career ==
Son of a minister and raised with his six siblings in rural Hawkesville, Ontario, Canada, Martin developed his passion for hockey, reading, business, and inventing things. One of his inventions was a telegraph system to communicate with friends. Raising German shepherds and boxers was Martin's first business, which he started at 5 years old. At 10, he was managing a country store. A hockey-related injury at age 15 resulted in the permanent gold cap on his front tooth.

“When I was selling things, customers would say, ‘I want the guy with the gold tooth’. It is part of who I am,” said Martin in The Times of London.

His sales career began at 19 when he joined Litton Industries’ Monroe Systems for Business. Within ten years, Martin rose to become the company's president.

== Executive career ==
=== Pitney Bowes ===
Martin's career at Pitney Bowes began when he joined Dictaphone Canada Ltd. in 1987. Three years later, Martin was appointed president of Pitney Bowes Copier Systems. While at the company's international business operations from 1998 to 2001, Pitney Bowes’ international revenue doubled, which came to represent 25 percent of the total company's revenue. In 2004, CEO Michael J. Critelli and Pitney Bowes's board of directors appointed Martin as president and chief operating officer (COO).

During his tenure as president and COO, Pitney Bowes’ international revenue quadrupled. Martin led the work that developed early partnerships with Internet companies such as eBay. In a 2005 Nikkei News interview, Martin said, “Internet business has created a new growth area for postal services as well.”

=== CEO leadership and strategy ===
In 2007, Martin was appointed Pitney Bowes CEO. He led the company's restructuring, which included eliminating 1,500 jobs, representing 4 percent of its global workforce. That same year, Pitney Bowes acquired Digital Cement Inc. and Asterion SAS. He was an architect in a total of 70 acquisitions expanding Pitney Bowes’ reach throughout all segments of the mailstream, including mail services and work sharing with the acquisition of PSI, software with the acquisition of Group 1 and MapInfo, and marketing services with the acquisition of Imagitas and AAS/PMH. In the first quarter of 2008, Pitney Bowes reported 11% growth. Two years after being appointed CEO, Martin was appointed chairman of the board. Martin's strategies for Pitney Bowes' included expanding into adjacent lines of business either through innovation or acquisition. Creating processes for new products and service offerings that use Pitney Bowes technologies was also part of his approach to strategy. Martin is leading the company's transition through Pitney's Strategic Transformation to keep Pitney Bowes sustainable for another 90 years. Martin's announcement of the specific strategies included web-based and web-enabled services for small and medium businesses. Third-party secure transactions, customer communications management, records and information management for industries such as financial services, insurance, telecommunications, and government were other areas of focus. Martin retired on December 3, 2012. He was replaced by Marc B Lautenbach.

=== Stock price ===
From 2007 to December 4, 2012, the date of his announced "Retirement", Pitney Bowes has lost shareholder value (79%) as the stock has slipped from $47.09 a share to its closing price of $11.03 a share on December 4, 2012. History of Pitney Bowes since 1920

=== Board memberships ===
Martin was a director on the board of directors at the Business Council of Fairfield County, The Brink's Company, National Urban League, and Catalyst. Martin was the chairman of the board of visitors and a trustee at Sacred Heart University.

=== Patents ===
Martin is named on two patents. Closed loop postage metering system and method for mail address block image information encoding, protection and recovery in postal payment applications.

== Recognition ==
Martin earned awards and honorary degrees for his involvement in philanthropy. He attributes his upbringing to his commitment to community involvement.

- Volunteer Center of Southwestern Fairfield County Heart of Gold Award
- Centre for Applied Cryptographic Research (CACR) Distinguished Fellow Award
- The Volunteer Center of Southwestern Fairfield County Heart of Gold Award 2009
- Childcare Learning Centers Community Service Award 2011
- Sacred Heart University Honorary Doctor of Humane Letters degree
- University of Waterloo Honorary Doctorate

== Compensation ==
On May 17, 2012, Pitney Bowes filed Form 8K with the Securities and Exchange Commission, announcing that shareholders had rejected the advisory vote on executive compensation at the company.

While CEO of Pitney Bowes in 2008, Murray D. Martin earned a total compensation of $5,115,280, which included a base salary of $941,667, a cash bonus of $2,109,000, no stocks, and options granted of $1,950,000.

Ranked #264 on 2011 Forbes CEO pay list.
