= From the Rough =

- Release poster
- Directed by: Pierre Bagley
- Written by: Michael A. Critelli; Pierre Bagley
- Produced by: Pierre Bagley; Michael J. Critelli; Kevin E. Hooks
- Starring: Taraji P. Henson; Tom Felton; Michael Clarke Duncan; Henry Simmons; LeToya Luckett; Justin Chon; Ben Youcef
- Cinematography: Giorgio Scali
- Edited by: Devin Maurer; Guy Ross
- Music by: Mateo Messina
- Production company: From The Rough Productions
- Distributed by: Freestyle Releasing
- Release dates: July 1, 2011 (Essence Music Festival); April 25, 2014 (United States)
- Running time: 97 minutes
- Country: United States
- Language: English
- Budget: almost $7 million

From the Rough is a 2011 American sports drama film based on the true story of Catana Starks, a former Tennessee State Tigers swim coach, who became the first woman ever to coach a college men’s golf team. With drive, passion, and guts, she took an unruly group of mismatched kids from around the world and guided them to an all-time record at the PGA National Collegiate Minority Championship.

Tasked with building Tennessee State’s first golf team and finding only one available African American golfer – Craig, a former caddy with plenty of talent but no confidence – Catana Starks pushes outside TSU’s Historically Black context, and, against huge resistance, opens up the roster to underprivileged kids from around the world. The film stars Taraji P. Henson as Coach Starks, as well as Tom Felton, Michael Clarke Duncan and LeToya Luckett. The film was co-written by Michael A. Critelli and Pierre Bagley and directed by Bagley.

== Plot ==
Catana Starks is the coach for the women's swimming team at Tennessee State University. She meets her new boss, Kendrick Paulsen, who reveals the school is creating a men's golf team. Starks asks to be the team's coach and Paulsen agrees. However, Starks is angry when she learns Paulsen is giving the golf team very little funding, and even has to fight him just to get enough money to offer scholarships to players.

Starks attempts to recruit African-American golf players for the team, but is only able to get Craig, a talented former caddy, for the team. When she learns the school's soccer team has recruited German players, Starks goes international as well and recruits four young men from all over the world – Edward from London, Ji-Kyung (nicknamed Young Ji) from South Korea, Cameron from Australia, and Bassam from Algeria. The team begins training and things are immediately difficult. Edward and Ji-Kyung act disrespectfully to Starks, especially after learning she has never coached a golf team before, Bassam is temperamental and has a constant bad attitude, and Craig's lack of confidence causes his game to suffer when playing in front of his teammates or a crowd. Edward develops a crush on Stacey, a medical student who is a former member of Starks's swim team.

The team play their first tournament and it is disastrous, and they come in dead last. Starks confronts the team about their poor teamwork and encourages them to give the game their all so they can win the upcoming Minority Championships, and begins helping Craig overcome his confidence issues. Stacey goes to Starks to ask for advice on her relationship with Edward, but Starks warns Stacey not to get involved with Edward. The team attends a party at a fraternity, where Stacey breaks up with Edward, who is upset to learn that Starks told her to do so. Bassam gets into a fight with two fraternity members, and as the men are leaving Cameron becomes furious that his actions could get them kicked off the team and shoves Bassam to the ground, reminding the group that golf is all they have. Paulsen meets with Starks to discuss the fight, and when Starks refuses to kick Bassam off the team without getting all the facts, Paulsen fires her due to his dislike of her constantly challenging him.

That night, Edward confronts Starks about Stacey and says she has no meaning in her life, causing her to break down in tears as she realizes just how much the team means to her. Starks speaks to each team member individually and connects with them. While speaking to Edward, she reveals that she once had a boyfriend who proposed to her just before he left to compete in a professional golf tournament, but Starks turned him down when he wanted her to choose between him or her own education and career. Starks explains she didn't want Stacey to experience the same thing. Starks invites the team to her house for dinner, where she reveals she has lost her job, but promises to help them win the championship. The team begin to bond and their performance at tournaments improves dramatically. During a meeting of the athletics board, Paulsen reveals he fired Starks, angering the rest of the members. Paulsen becomes overwhelmed with anger at getting no respect due to his wealthy upbringing, until Roger, a janitor and Paulsen's former football teammate, tells Paulsen that he needs to give respect to those who have earned it if he wants to get any respect himself.

At the Minority Championships, Craig competes in the first round and chokes after he is bullied by a member of a prestigious golf team. At dinner, Cameron accidentally eats shellfish and suffers a severe allergic reaction, which prevents him from competing in the rest of the championship. Starks then impresses upon the four remaining team members how important it is for them to prove to the other schools that they have what it takes. The team supports Craig, and his confidence is boosted enough that he soon gets into the lead. On the final hole, when the rival golfer is putting, Edward distracts him using a technique he learned from Cameron and he misses the shot. As a result, the Tennessee State University men's golf team comes in first place, impressing Paulsen enough that he agrees to let Starks keep her job and remain the coach.

== Cast ==
- Taraji P. Henson as Catana Starks
- Tom Felton as Edward
- Michael Clarke Duncan as Roger
- LeToya Luckett as Stacey
- Henry Simmons as Kendrick Paulsen Jr.
- Justin Chon as Ji-Kyung
- Robert Bailey, Jr. as Craig
- Ben Youcef as Bassam
- Paul Hodge as Cameron
- Dana Gourrier as Cafeteria Worker

== Production ==
Executive producer Michael J. Critelli discovered the story that is the basis for the film in 2004, and spent over five years and "several hundred thousand dollars" acquiring the rights to film it and getting a screenplay, which was co-written by his son Michael A. Critelli.

Principal photography began in New Orleans on October 4, 2010, using the Dillard University campus as the main location. Principal photography was completed in early 2011.

On July 1, 2011, the film had a preview screening at the Essence Music Festival in New Orleans; it was also shown on Labor Day weekend at the "2011 Allstate Tom Joyner Family Reunion" in Orlando, FL and October 5, 2011 at the International Black Film Festival in Nashville, Tennessee; It was originally scheduled for a February 3, 2012 theatrical release

The movie is dedicated "In Loving Memory of Michael Clarke Duncan".
