= Android Cop =

- DVD cover
- Directed by: Mark Atkins
- Written by: Mark Atkins
- Produced by: David Michael Latt
- Starring: Michael Jai White; Charles S. Dutton; Randy Wayne; Kadeem Hardison
- Cinematography: Mark Atkins
- Edited by: Mark Atkins; William Boodell
- Music by: Chris Ridenhour
- Production company: The Asylum
- Distributed by: The Asylum
- Release date: February 4, 2014
- Running time: 88 minutes
- Country: United States
- Language: English

Android Cop is a 2014 American science fiction action film produced by The Asylum and directed by Mark Atkins. The film stars Michael Jai White, Charles S. Dutton, Randy Wayne and Kadeem Hardison. It is a mockbuster of RoboCop.

== Plot ==
In 2045, Los Angeles Police Department detective Hammond (Michael Jai White) and his new partner "Andy" (Randy Wayne) — a state of the art crimefighting robot cop — are tasked with recovering a runaway Telepresence android containing the consciousness of Mayor Jacobs's (Charles S. Dutton) daughter Helen (Larissa Vereza), who remains unaware that she is a human mind in a machine body. Hammond does not trust machines due to a prior incident in which his partner was killed by an automated gun turret despite their using a code to control it, and maintains a tense, often sarcastic relationship with Andy. Hammond and Andy are dispatched to the "Zone," a quarantined section of Los Angeles devastated by an earthquake and subsequent nuclear leaks, which have infected and mutated the Zone's residents.

However, they are unaware that a number of their fellow LAPD officers are corrupt, working for Mayor Jacobs himself in a plan to provoke violence with the goal of justifying an invasion of the Zone and termination of its residents. The corrupt cops are led by Sgt. Jones (Kadeem Hardison), Hammond's colleague. Hammond and Andy reach the Zone and trace Helen's cellphone, but have to be rescued by her when a bomb is planted on their car. She reveals to them that Zone residents are giving birth to healthy, mutation-free children, causing them to realize that the story about nuclear leaks was a lie. En route to what they believe to be an extraction point, Hammond, Andy and Helen realize that the lie about nuclear leakage was spread to manipulate land prices, and that the real source of the disease is the food drop program for which Mayor Jacobs has received honor.

At the extraction point, Helen realizes she is an android, and Hammond comforts her. Jones and a team of corrupt cops arrive intending to kill Hammond, Andy and Helen, but Andy discovers their motives using analysis of their facial motions. As Hammond and Helen flee, the corrupt cops initiate their Plan 'B,' overriding the controls of a police android — however, it is not Andy, it is Hammond. The incident at the gun turret in the past had actually involved Hammond suffering mortal injuries, while Helen was hurt trying to help him. Both were placed on life support and given control of Telepresence androids. Hammond resists the attempts to force him to terminate Helen and overloads the control computer, leaving himself in full control of his actions. Andy holds off Jones's squad, and the three escape. They decide they must reach the city and publicize the truth about Mayor Jacobs's plan.

As a desperate, last-ditch attempt to salvage their plans, the corrupt cops disconnect Hammond and Helen's life support, leaving them with only around twenty minutes before their android bodies shut down. Andy leaps onto the flying vehicle carrying Jones's team and crashes it, while Hammond and Helen crash into the hospital. With very little time left, they embrace in the back seat of their car, and Hammond dies. Andy reaches Helen with help from her nurse android, whose computers he had accessed earlier, and gives her an injection. Mayor Jacobs arrives, and believing Helen to be dead, thanks Andy for his service and claims Helen signed a do not resuscitate order, which must be enforced. However, Helen wakes up and remembers everything, much to Jacobs's shock. Andy uses his systems to broadcast their conversation, revealing Mayor Jacobs's treachery to the public. The remaining honest police arrive to arrest Jacobs, who commits suicide.

Sometime later, Hammond's neural patterns have been programmed into a full android, resurrecting him in a body similar to Andy's. Maintaining their sarcastic but productive partnership, they go out on duty again.

== Cast ==
- Michael Jai White as Officer Hammond
- Charles S. Dutton as Mayor Jacobs
- Kadeem Hardison as Sergeant Jones
- Randy Wayne as Android Cop/Andy
- Larissa Vereza as Helen Jacobs
- Jay Gillespie as Reynolds
- Deena Trudy as Officer Jackson
- Delpaneaux Wills as Officer Williams
- Duane Avery as Newald Mason

== Release ==
The film was released direct-to-video and video-on-demand on February 4, 2014 in the United States. In the tradition of The Asylum's catalog, Android Cop is a mockbuster of the 2014 MGM/Columbia Pictures remake of RoboCop.
