= Nena Blake =

Canadian-American actress (1887–1924)

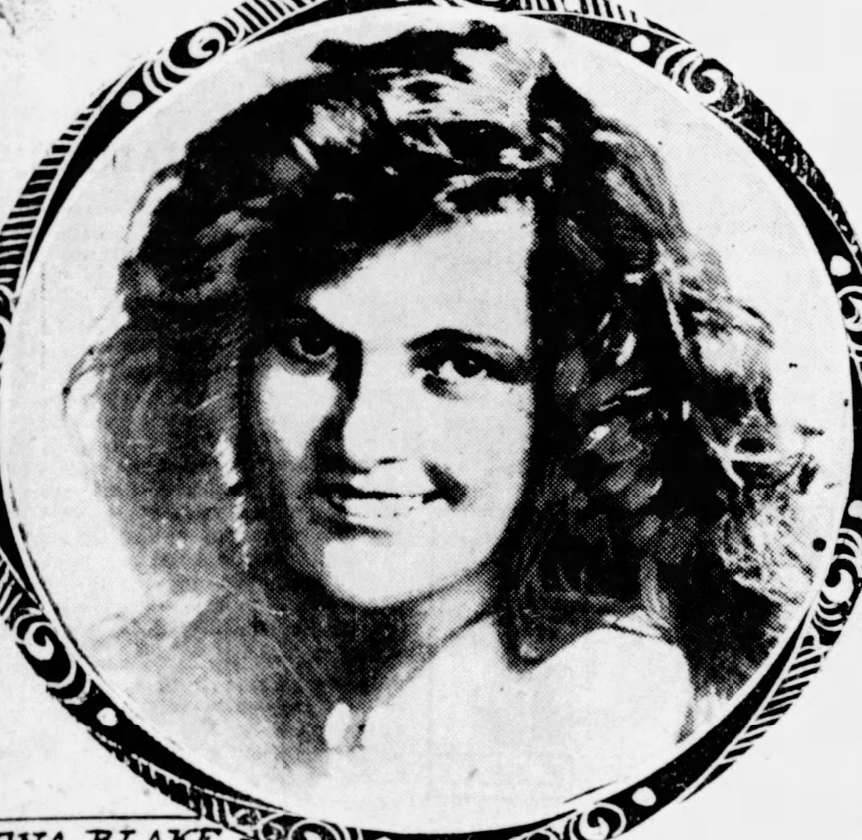
- Nena Blake, from a 1907 publication
- Born: Nena Naomi Fry; 1887; Ontario, Canada
- Died: October 12, 1924 (aged 37); New York, New York, U.S.
- Occupation: Actress
- Mother: Lena Jane Fry

Nena Blake (1887 – October 12, 1924), born as Nena Naomi Fry, was a Canadian-born American actress and chorus girl on Broadway and in vaudeville.

== Early life and education ==
Blake was born in Ontario, the daughter of Stephen Fry and Lena Jane Fry. Her mother was a writer, who dedicated her 1905 utopian novel to Nena and her sisters Bertha and Kathleen, calling them "three of America's best daughters". Her parents divorced in 1894.

== Career ==
Blake appeared on Broadway in the shows The Royal Chef (1904), Coming Thro' the Rye (1906), The Girl from Rector's (1909), The Girl with the Whooping Cough (1910), A Certain Party (1911), and Bachelors and Benedicts (1912). In Boston in 1905, she appeared in a musical revue, Kafoozelem, singing "Baby Lonely" with a chorus of eight dancers called "the Incubator Babies", referencing a common sideshow attraction of the day.

In 1906 Blake appeared in a revue with dancers called the Bronco Beauties; she shared the bill with Ruth St. Denis performing Radha. In 1913 and 1914, she starred in a comedy by James Montgomery, Ready Money, in a touring company that played across the United States, including runs in San Francisco and New York. In 1916 she starred in Spring Cleaning in Atlantic City. In 1921 Blake directed the costumes for Irene, a Broadway musical. She personally brought the fabric and designs for 42 gowns from Paris for the show.

Beyond the stage, Blake was active in politics, and associated with the Theatrical Women's Parker Association, in support of Alton B. Parker's 1904 presidential campaign. Also in 1904, she was reported abducted by a fan at the stage door, though this was later described as a publicity stunt. In 1905 a wealthy banker and mine owner from Montana, Michael Sellers Largey, took a personal interest in Blake, and spent extravagantly to help her career, but she refused his repeated proposals of marriage. In 1909, she organized the Dowry Fund Protection Association for actresses, to remove the temptation to marry wealthy men entirely for financial reasons.

== Personal life ==
Blake inherited money from an admirer in 1907. She died in New York City in 1924, at the age of 37. She left her house on Long Island and her jewels to her mother and other family members.
