= To Save a Life =

- Theatrical release poster
- Directed by: Brian Baugh
- Written by: Jim Britts
- Produced by: Jim Britts
- Starring: Randy Wayne; Deja Kreutzberg; Joshua Wiegel
- Cinematography: C. Clifford Jones
- Edited by: Dan O'Brien
- Music by: Timothy Michael Wynn
- Production companies: New Song Pictures; Outreach Films; Accelerated Entertainment
- Distributed by: Samuel Goldwyn Films
- Release dates: November 5, 2009 (Outreach Film Festival); January 22, 2010 (United States)
- Running time: 120 minutes
- Country: United States
- Language: English
- Budget: $500,000
- Box office: $3.7 million

To Save a Life is a 2009 American Christian drama film directed by Brian Baugh and starring Randy Wayne, Deja Kreutzberg, Robert Bailey Jr., Steven Crowder and Sean Michael Afable. The film was released theatrically in the United States on January 22, 2010, and was written by Jim Britts. The United States rights were acquired by Samuel Goldwyn Films from New Song Pictures.

To Save a Life was produced on a budget of about $1 million, but earned nearly double that in its opening weekend. The film was released to 441 theaters on January 22, 2010, and has grossed $3,777,210 domestically. It was received with mixed to generally negative reviews from film critics.

== Plot ==
Jake Taylor, a high school student living in San Diego, California, attends the funeral of his ex-best friend Roger Dawson. One day while the two were kids, Roger pushed Jake out of the way of a car, saving him but crippling himself forever. During their freshmen year of high school, a freshman cheerleader named Amy Briggs invites Jake, now part of the school's basketball team, to a party that Roger was not invited to. Soon enough, Jake joins a new popular group of friends, begins dating Amy, and becomes the star of the basketball team. Jake grew further away from Roger, who became more of a loner due to his condition. Three years later in their senior year, Roger enters the school with a gun and began to shoot. Despite Jake's attempt to stop him, Roger shoots himself and dies from his injuries, prompting Jake to wonder if he could have saved him by being a better friend.

After the final basketball game of his senior year, Jake meets Chris Vaughn, a youth pastor, who had spoken at Roger's funeral. Jake goes to a party that is broken up by the police and is the last to sneak out of the house. Since Amy borrowed his truck, Jake decides to call the number on the business card Chris gave him. On the ride home, Chris reveals that Roger had come to church the Sunday before he killed himself.

Jake continues to struggle in dealing with Roger's death, frequently attending church and drawing concern from Amy because of his behavior. He discovers Roger's social networking page and sees that he openly discussed his hopelessness. Amy joins Jake at church the following Sunday, but leaves during the service, feeling judged. Jake confronts the group about their shallow faith and failure to be inclusive and inviting, and a girl named Andrea suggests that they all have lunch together at school as a solution.

For the next few weeks, they all meet at lunch every day. Slowly, Jake becomes shunned by all of his old friends, including Amy. Jake invites Jonny, a boy who had been mocked by a fake invitation to a party, to join them, which he accepts. Jake starts to emerge from the darkness he felt following Roger's death as he, Jonny, and Andrea become friends.

After some time, Jonny asks Jake for advice on asking Andrea on a date. The date ends when Jonny accidentally drops his ice cream in her lap, causing her to draw back. Meanwhile, Jake discovers that Amy is pregnant with his baby and doesn't want to keep the child. He then discovers that his parents are about to divorce after his father had an affair. The next day at school, Jonny wants help from Jake on what to do with Andrea; Jake ultimately brushes aside his concerns, effectively humiliating him in front of his peers.

When Danny, the pastor's son, overhears Jake and Chris talking about Amy's pregnancy, he posts drawings all over the school announcing the news. In the weeks that follow, Jake stops hanging out with his old friends for good and spends more time with his new friends. He gives up his dream about going to college and talks to Amy, who has decided to keep the baby. Having been shunned by all her old friends at school, she begins spending time with Andrea and the other girls from the church.

Minutes later, students are evacuated from the school due to a bomb threat. Danny steps forward and tells the police he thinks it was Jonny. After a search of his locker, they ask Jonny for his phone, which he doesn't have because Danny took it. The police handcuff Jonny and walk him through the crowd of the entire student body. Jake realizes that Jonny didn't make the threats when he calls Jonny's phone and sees Danny answer it. With Amy distracting the teachers that guard the exit, Jake runs past them to the road and steps in front of the police car, preventing Jonny from a drug overdose. Danny is then caught by the police as Chris becomes the new pastor in his place.

Jake's life soon begins to look up. His daughter is placed in open adoption, and Amy gets back together with him. His friends and family gather to see him off to Louisville for college, and his dad comes along with him so they can talk. Jonny gives Jake a note to read on the way there stating that he actually did feel like Roger and had considered taking his life, as well. He stated that if Jake had not invited him for lunch that day, he did not know where he would be at the moment. At that point, Jake and his father resume the trip to Louisville.

== Cast ==
- Randy Wayne as Jacob "Jake" Taylor
- Deja Kreutzberg as Amanda "Amy" Briggs
- Joshua Weigel as Christopher "Chris" Vaughn
- Sean Michael Afable as Jonathan "Jonny" Garcia
- Robert Bailey Jr. as Roger Dawson
- Steven Crowder as Douglas "Doug" Moore
- D. David Morin as Marcus "Mark" Rivers
- Kim Hidalgo as Andrea Stevens
- Arjay Smith as Matt McQueen
- Bubba Lewis as Daniel "Danny" Rivers

== Production ==
The film is a partnership among three faith-based companies: Samuel Goldwyn Films (which released Fireproof, Facing the Giants, and Amazing Grace), Outreach Films, and New Song Pictures. Writer and producer Jim Britts was inspired to make the movie after observing a simple problem: many teenagers are hurting. Britts, a Christian youth pastor in Southern California, and his wife, a schoolteacher, began taking the many stories of teens' struggles and molding them into a film. "Every day my wife and I talk to teens who are in some kind of pain," Britts said. "I wanted to make a film that would bring hope to hurting and lonely students."

Director Brian Baugh was surprised at the grittiness of the script, in stark contrast to many other Christian films. The movie includes scenes of teen drinking, marijuana smoking, cutting (inflicting self-injury), moderate profanity, and implications of sex. Baugh none the less decided to keep these elements in to make the film a more realistic depiction of typical teens. Actor Randy Wayne, the star of the film, said he originally rejected the idea of starring because it was being made with a low budget, but he eventually accepted the offer and offered to do it for free. The film has been marketed in a grassroots fashion, a tactic that proved successful for low-budget Christian films like Fireproof.

Over 80% of the cast and crew for To Save a Life consisted of Oceanside and North County locals. Several Oceanside locations, including Oceanside High School, Calvin Christian High School, MiraCosta College, New Song Community Church, Eternal Hills Memorial Park, Harbor, Guajome Park Academy, and Beach are shown in the film.

== Soundtrack ==
To Save A Life Official Movie Soundtrack

Soundtrack album by Various
- Released: January 20, 2010
- Genre: Christian
- Labels: Twenty Ten Music; New Song Pictures; TuneCore

The soundtrack for To Save a Life has been released as a digital download on the official website of the film and iTunes. The film's original score was composed by Timothy Michael Wynn and produced by Christopher Lennertz.

Track listing

1. "Boom" (Da Enforcerz)
2. "500,000 Boomin’ Watts" (Flynn Adam)
3. "Bounce" (J-Rus)
4. "Dare you to move" (Switchfoot)
5. "Fall Back" (Bobby Taylor)
6. "Outsider" (The Daylights)
7. "Golden Thread" (Joy Williams)
8. "Sunset Cliffs" (Paul Wright)
9. "Go Together" (Jillian Edwards)
10. "Rollercoaster" (Kendall Payne)
11. "Hero (Red Pill Mix)" (Superchick)
12. "Future Plans" (Timothy Michael Wynn)

== Release ==
=== Critical reception ===
To Save a Life received mixed to generally negative reception from film critics. Rotten Tomatoes gave it a 41% rating based on 22 reviews, with an average rating of 4.90/10. Metacritic currently has its score listed as 19%.

Marjorie Baumgarten of the Austin Chronicle gave the film a negative review, saying, "To Save a Life is a well-meaning but ineptly made message movie..." Melissa Anderson of The Village Voice said, "For all its initial attempts to soften its religiosity... To Save a Life is about as subtle as this closing credit: 'The producers would like to thank: GOD.'" Andy Webster of The New York Times said, "The film would be a mere nuisance if not for its shameless exploitation of school shootings to advance its agenda."

Other reviewers were more supportive of the film. Gary Goldstein of The Los Angeles Times said, "The teen drama 'To Save a Life,' nicely directed by Brian Baugh from a script by Jim Britts, manages to be appealing, poignant and inspiring in ways that are gentle and quite real." Dan Bennett of the North County Times gave the film 3 of out 4 stars, saying, "Not pushy or intent on establishing an absolute doctrine, the film does well by throwing ideas out there, and letting the realistic characters define those." Bob Fischbach of the Omaha World-Herald said, "[To Save a Life's] messages are good ones for kids to hear. The characters' appeal and a sprinkling of humor should help draw a young audience." Hannah Goodwyn of CBN.com stated: "To Save a Life sends a good message to teens about faith, life, and loving others. It’s worth the ticket price for that, if nothing else." Movieguide.org comments: "Every aspect of TO SAVE A LIFE is well made. The editing is flawless, cutting imaginatively back and forth into flashbacks. The dialogue is constantly moving the story forward. This movie addresses some tough topics, including teenage suicide, drinking, sex, and drug use. This realistic background makes the story of repentance and forgiveness much more powerful..."

=== Box office ===
To Save a Life had a strong debut in its first weekend, amassing a total of $1,581,517, despite playing in only 441 theaters. Theaters in markets such as Burleson, Texas, Oceanside, California, Fort Lauderdale, Florida, and Evans, Georgia were the film's top grossing markets. The film was #3 on Fandango's most requested tickets going into the weekend. The film fell 53.6% in its second weekend to $733,457, and −63.2% to $269,684 in its third, accumulating $3,777,210 to date.

=== Home media ===
To Save a Life was released on DVD and Blu-ray on August 3, 2010. The DVD features an in-depth behind-the-scenes of the making of the film, deleted scenes, a gag reel, and music videos.
