= Nurse the Dead =

Philippine supernatural comedy drama television series

- Genre: Supernatural; Comedy drama Medical drama Black comedy Workplace comedy
- Created by: Mark Labella
- Showrunner: Mark Labella
- Written by: Mark Labella
- Directed by: Mark Labella
- Starring: Jelynn Malone; Gigette Reyes; Anthony Jennings; Princess Punzalan; Ruby Rodriguez
- Country of origin: Philippines
- Original languages: English; Filipino
- No. of seasons: 1
- No. of episodes: 8

Production
- Executive producers: Carlo L. Katigbak; Jaime Lopez; Cory Vidanes
- Producers: Marvin Aritrangco; Mark Labella; Wesley Villarica
- Production location: Los Angeles
- Running time: 22–36 minutes
- Production company: iWant

Original release
- Network: iWant
- Release: June 12, 2026 – present

Nurse the Dead is a Philippine supernatural comedy drama television series created by Mark Labella. The series stars Jelynn Malone as Noa Reyes, a Filipino nurse supervisor in a haunted hospital who has the ability to see ghosts with her third eye.

The series was filmed in Los Angeles. Mark Labella also serves as showrunner, writer, and director. iWant is producing the show for its streaming service which will be the first bilingual series on American soil.

== Premise ==
Noa Reyes, a Filipina nurse supervisor whose ability to see ghosts — referred to as her “third eye” — makes her the go-to handler for a hospital ward teeming with restless spirits. Juggling apparitions alongside staff burnout, family pressures and a coworker who seems to know more about her than expected.

== Cast ==
=== Main cast ===
- Jelynn Malone as Noa Reyes
  - Harlowe Malone as young Noa
- Gigette Reyes as Teresita Reyes / Mami Tess
- Anthony Jennings as Grim
- Princess Punzalan as Camille Alejandro
- Ruby Rodriguez as Rosalinda "Ross" Amee

=== Supporting cast ===
- Johari Johnson as Jane Taylor
- Pablo Azar as Atzin Castañeda
- Tootsie Guevarra as Zeny
- Sydney Bollenbeck as Donna Mae "DonDon" Baur
- Kyle Rezzarday as George McAllister
- Natalie Orsi as Archangel Yolanda
- Fahim Fazli as Mr. Hamid
- Brett Justin Koppel as Reid

== Episodes ==
No.	Title	Directed by	Written by	Original release date
1	"The Do Not Open File"	Wesley Villarica	Mark Labella	June 12, 2026
Meet Noa Reyes, a driven Filipina nurse with a terrifying work ethic—and a third eye. Promoted to supervise Ward 5, one of LA’s most haunted and understaffed hospital units, Noa tries to boost morale the Filipino way, but no one is having it.
2	"Tongue-Tied"	Drea Castro	Mark Labella	June 19, 2026
Pressure mounts on Noa when an arrogant executive enforces an “English-only” policy, silencing immigrant nurses. Meanwhile, the Ward 5 staff struggles to convince a non-English-speaking patient to undergo surgery.
3	"World War One"	Drea Castro, Mark Labella, and Wesley Villarica	Mark Labella	June 26, 2026
The Nurse of the Year award returns, and Ward 5 finally gets its long-awaited chance to nominate, thanks to Noa's persistence. But first, Noa and her team must face off against the seemingly perfect Ward 1 and its queen bee with a spotless record.
4	"Love is Grim"	Wesley Villarica	Mark Labella	July 3, 2026
A bouquet arrives in Ward 5, and with it, a dangerous spark. What should have been a harmless delivery ignites gossip, confusion, and chaos, exposing Noa’s carefully buried truth.
5	"Chismis, Lies, and Videotape"	Wesley Villarica, Drea Castro, and Mark Labella	Mark Labella	July 10, 2026
Noa suspects that one of her patients was misdiagnosed, pushing her to risk everything to save a single life. Meanwhile, Camille’s highly anticipated comeback interview turns into a humiliating disaster.
6	"What Goes Unseen"	Mark Labella	Mark Labella	July 17, 2026
When an elderly Filipina caregiver collapses at the hospital with no ID and no one she trusts, Noa and Ros uncover a heartbreaking story of exploitation close to home. Grim begins to understand humanity after unexpectedly enjoying his day off.
7	"Ofrenda"	John Leo Garcia	Mark Labella	July 24, 2026
When Atzin’s spiritual gift fully awakens, Ward Five turns Dia de los Muertos into a celebration for the living and the dead. As ghosts flood the hospital, Camille’s faith is shaken, Jane fights to save the ward, and Noa faces her ultimate fear.
8	"First Comes Denial. Then Comes..."	Wesley Villarica, Drea Castro, and Mark Labella	Mark Labella	July 31, 2026
Noa fights to save the family she built when Ward Five faces a surprise inspection designed to bring them down. As Mami Tess gets targeted by a powerful force, a long-buried secret threatens to shatter mother and daughter forever.

== Production ==
=== Development and casting ===
The series is already in production since January 2026 with Mark Labella as creator and director with Charlyn Villegas as assistant director. The series cast were also confirmed by Labella and was announced that Princess Punzalan, Anthony Jennings, and Ruby Rodriguez will be part of the series. In February 2026, Jelynn Malone was cast for the lead role in the show at the same time additional cast are Gigette Reyes, Johari Johnson, Tootsie Guevarra, Sydney Bollenbeck, Kyle Rezzarday, and Natalie Orsi. Mark Abella will additionally serve as a writer and showrunner with Wesley Villarica and Drea Castro directing the episodes. The series is being produced by iWant.

=== Filming ===
Principal photography started in Los Angeles and wrapped on February 16, 2026.

== Release ==
The series is set to release on iWant on June 12, 2026. The series consists of 8 episodes.
