= Brody the Bear =

Animal actor

Brody the Bear (born January 14, 1995, in Sequim, Washington) was a male Kodiak bear and animal actor.

== Background ==
The bear was raised and trained by his owners, Jeff and the late Leanne Watson, since he was 8 weeks old and weighed less than 10 pounds (4.5 kg). The Watsons acquired Brody from animal trainer and cinematographer Lloyd Beebe who operated the Olympic Game Farm and managed animal actors for Disney. Brody and the Watsons traveled throughout the United States educating the public about bears and safety.

His first television appearance was on Good Morning America at the age of 12 weeks. He appeared in numerous films, television shows, commercials and print ads and appeared on the cover of National Geographic Magazine.

Brody was sponsored by Berne Apparel, a manufacturer of outdoor work apparel, as their live mascot and is pictured in the company's corporate logo and other marketing materials.

== Filmography ==
Television	Films	Commercials
Promised Land	Grizzly Park	Rice Krispie Treats
Twice in a Lifetime	The Lil' River Rats and the Adventure of the Lost Treasure	Energizer
Good Morning America	You Just Have to Love Bears	Berne Apparel
The Tonight Show	"Cute as a Cub"	AEG - Europe
The Today Show	Wild Babies of Yellowstone	Marlboro Adventure Team
Animal Face-Off	Wild America - credits footage	Marlboro Adventure Gear
Corwin's Quest	Warner Bros. - vocal	Associated Food Stores
Real TV	P.T. Barnum - Simon Wincer	
Hardball with Chris Matthews	Anatomy of a Grizzly Attack	

== See also ==
- List of individual bears
- Bart the Bear
