= Hawkesville, Ontario =

Hawkesville
- Unincorporated community
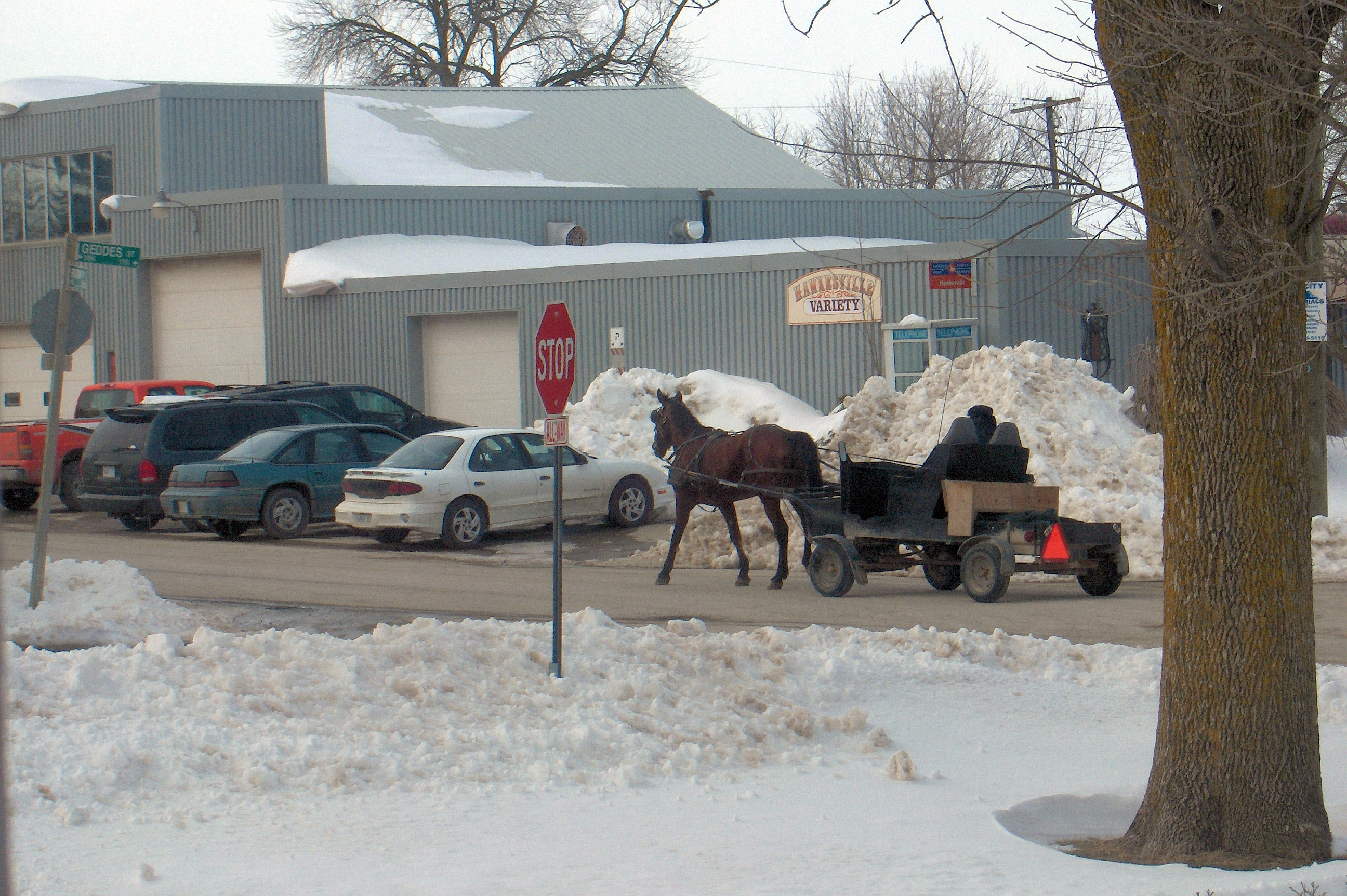
- A street in Hawkesville.

- Location within Regional Municipality of Waterloo Location within Southern Ontario
- Coordinates: 43°33′48″N 80°38′21″W
- Country: Canada
- Province: Ontario
- Regional municipality: Waterloo
- Township: Wellesley
- Settled: 1805
- Incorporated (town): 1852
- Elevation: 357 m (1,171 ft)
- Time zone: UTC-5 (EST)
  - Summer (DST): UTC-4 (EDT)
- Forward sortation area: N0B 1X0
- Area codes: 519 and 226
- NTS Map: 040P10
- GNBC Code: FBMKY

The village of Hawkesville in Ontario, Canada is a small community in the township of Wellesley in the Regional Municipality of Waterloo. Several Mennonite families are located nearby. Hawkesville is noted for its custom-built furniture industry.

== History ==
Though Wellesley Township itself was not surveyed until 1842 and was only incorporated in 1852, settlers were already long in this area. By 1805, many Mennonites from Pennsylvania had settled nearby in what became known as Berlin, and today as Kitchener. In 1837, the same year that William Lyon Mackenzie's rebellion was defeated at York (now Toronto), John Philip Schweitzer from Germany squatted at what is now Hawkesville, and had 40 acres (160,000 m^{2}) of land cleared over the following nine years.

In 1843, former slaves from the United States made their way to Canada through the Underground Railroad and settled near Hawkesville. John Brown, a runaway slave from Virginia, and his wife Lucinda, had 11 children.

John Hawke received government permission to buy the Schweitzer clearing for $700.00 on the condition that he build a grist mill (for flour) and a sawmill within two years. John Hawke, the second son of Benjamin Hawke and Mary (Lount), had arrived.

Benjamin Hawke was a United Empire Loyalist and a Quaker that fled military conflict in the United States to settle in Simcoe County. Though his wife's family, the Lounts, were also Quakers, his brother-in-law Samuel Lount was one of William Lyon Mackenzie's lieutenants in the 1837 revolt. After Samuel Lount was hanged for treason, Benjamin Hawke decided to move out of Simcoe County. When his son John received permission to purchase 40 acres (160,000 m^{2}) in Waterloo County, Benjamin moved there with his wife, his four sons, and his seven daughters. The Hawkes arrived in 1846; John built the grist mill, his younger brother Piercifer built a sawmill, and "Hawke’s village" appeared on the Waterloo County map.

A post office was established in Hawkesville in 1852, operated by Gabriel Hawke. When the Waterloo County boundaries were established in 1852 to include the townships of Waterloo, Wellesley, Wilmot, Woolwich, and North Dumfries, John Hawke was named the first Reeve of Wellesley and the first township hall was built in Hawkesville. When the decision was being made for the location of a county seat, Hawkesville originally anticipated being chosen over Berlin and Galt. However, John Hawke had the deciding vote, and he cast it in favour of Berlin. With the railroad and the county seat, Berlin began to grow rapidly and kept on growing; Hawkesville flourished only until the end of the century before diminishing.

Records from 1864 indicate that the community of about 400 people had three stores, two woolen factories, a tannery, two wagon makers and some tradesmen. The school in Hawkesville had 100 students by that time. There were four churches, although two were still under construction in 1864. The 6th Division court held its hearings in this community.

Into the early 1900s, the village Carriage and wagon maker, George M. Diefenbacker (his preferred spelling) would entertain his grandson each summer, the late Prime Minister John G. Diefenbaker.

Because Hawkesville is located on a hill near the Conestogo River, it was too difficult to construct a railway to Hawkesville.

=== Churches ===
A Presbyterian congregation worshiped in town from 1868 to 1946. Their church building was dedicated as Hawkesville Mennonite Church on January 1, 1950. Only the Hawkesville Mennonite Church and the Countryside Mennonite Fellowship remain in Hawkesville.

A United Brethren church also existed in Hawkesville from 1865 until 1904. The gothic windows and rafters are still visible inside the shop of Hawkwoods Custom Furniture.

Another group started meeting in 1931 and completed the building of a Gospel Hall next door to the village's cemetery in 1939. This group became the Hawkesville Bible Chapel, but their Hall became overcrowded and they moved into a new building in Wallenstein in 1968 where the Wallenstein Bible Chapel remains today.

== Demographics ==
In the 2021 Census of Population conducted by Statistics Canada, Hawkesville had a population of 301 living in 93 of its 93 total private dwellings, a change of −3.2% from its 2016 population of 311. With a land area of 0.44 km^{2} (0.17 sq mi), it had a population density of 684.1/km^{2} (1,771.8/sq mi) in 2021.

== Economy ==
Hawkesville is home to several small and medium size businesses including the larger Frey Building Contractors and the Country Lane Builders.

Hawkesville is noted for its custom-built furniture industry. While many Mennonites in the surrounding area build and sell furniture, Hawkesville itself is home to three furniture businesses: Chervin, Hawkwoods Custom Furniture, and Homestead Woodworks.

Noah Martin's summer sausage was located in Hawkesville until his death.

== Government ==
Located in the Kitchener-Conestoga electoral riding, Hawkesville was represented in Ottawa, from 2006 to 2019, by the Conservative Member of Parliament, Harold Albrecht. In the 2019 federal election, the riding was won by the current Liberal Member of Parliament, Tim Louis.

At Queen's Park in Toronto, Hawkesville has been represented since 2018 by the Progressive Conservative Member of Provincial Parliament, Mike Harris Jr.

== Notable people ==
- Lena Jane Fry (1850–1938), writer
- Henry George Lackner, doctor and political figure
- Murray D. Martin, global business executive

== Bibliography ==
Ogram, Grace "Letter to the Hawkesville Cemetery" 30 July 1986. Waterloo-Wellington Branch, Ontario Genealogical Society
Dick, J. and Longo, M. Heritage Driving Tour of Wellesley Township. Waterloo Regional Heritage Foundation, 1989.
"Hawkesville Village History." Hawkesville Walking Tour. Hawkesville Heritage Day, June 1991.
