= Jackie's Back =

- DVD cover
- Written by: Mark Alton Brown; Dee LaDuke
- Directed by: Robert Townsend
- Starring: Jenifer Lewis; Tim Curry; Whoopi Goldberg; Loretta Devine
- Theme music composer: Marc Shaiman
- Country of origin: United States
- Original language: English

Production
- Producer: Gideon Amir
- Cinematography: Charles Mills
- Editor: John L. Price
- Running time: 120 minutes

Original release
- Network: Lifetime
- Release: June 14, 1999

Jackie's Back (stylized as Jackie's Back!) is a 1999 American television film directed by Robert Townsend and stars Jenifer Lewis in a title role. It also starred Tim Curry, Loretta Devine, Tom Arnold, and Whoopi Goldberg. It premiered on the Lifetime Television Network on June 14, 1999. It received NAACP Image Award nomination for Outstanding Television Movie, Mini-Series or Dramatic Special in 2000.

== Plot ==
Presented as a mockumentary, Jackie's Back chronicles the life and career of Jackie Washington (Jenifer Lewis), a 1960s/1970s R&B singer. After several years of toiling in obscurity, Washington organizes a comeback concert with filmmaker Edward Whatsett St. John (Tim Curry) filming the event. The film also features numerous appearances by celebrities.

== Cast ==
- Jenifer Lewis as Jackie Washington
- Tim Curry as Edward Whatsett St. John
- T.V. Blake as Antandra Washington (Jackie's daughter)
- Tangie Ambrose as Shaniqua Summers Wells (Jackie's daughter)
- Robert Bailey, Jr. as Wilson Wells (Jackie's grandson)
- Whoopi Goldberg as Nurse Ethyl Washington Rue Owens (Jackie's sister)
- Loretta Devine as Snookie Tate (Jackie's childhood friend)
- Tom Arnold as Marvin Pritz (Jackie's former manager)
- Alan Blumenfeld as Ivan
- Loren Freeman as Kim
- Johnny Brown as Reverend Eustace Barnett
- Julie Hagerty as Pammy Dunbar
- David Hyde Pierce as Perry
- Kathy Najimy as Lola Molina
- Kyla Pratt as Little Jackie Washington
- Rudy Ray Moore as Dolemite
- Isabel Sanford as Miss Krumes
- JoBeth Williams as Jo Face
- Mary Wilson as Vesta Crotchley (Jackie's third-grade teacher)
- Richard Lawson as Milkman Summers (Jackie's ex-husband #1)
- Reynaldo Rey as Cadillac Johnson (retired pimp)

=== Cameos ===
- Patti Austin
- Charles Barkley
- Diahann Carroll
- Eddie Cibrian
- Jackie Collins
- Don Cornelius
- Taylor Dayne
- Melissa Etheridge
- Kathy Griffin
- Sean Hayes
- Ricki Lake
- Howie Mandel
- Camryn Manheim
- Penny Marshall
- Bette Midler
- Liza Minnelli
- Rosie O'Donnell
- Dolly Parton
- Donna Pescow
- Chris Rock
- Eva Marie Saint
- Grace Slick
- Robert Townsend
- Bruce Vilanch

== See also ==
- List of American films of 1999
