= Robert Bailey Jr. =

American actor

- Born: October 28, 1989 (age 36); Minneapolis, Minnesota, U.S.
- Occupation: Actor
- Years active: 1996–present

Robert Bailey Jr. (born October 28, 1989) is an American actor. Beginning his career as a child, Bailey appeared in films Mission to Mars (2000) and Dragonfly (2002), and acted in various television series during the late 1990s and 2000s.

As an adult, Bailey has been a main cast member on medical drama The Night Shift (2014−17) and mystery drama Emergence (2019−20), in addition to a recurring role in science fiction space drama For All Mankind (2022−2026).

== Biography ==
Bailey is a native of Minneapolis, Minnesota. He was first discovered at the age of three by Family Circle magazine. Bailey's first role was a guest appearance on crime drama Nash Bridges in 1996, at the age of six. He then appeared in small roles on The Practice, Touched by an Angel, Walker, Texas Ranger and ER. Bailey had a bit part in the first Disney Channel Original Movie, Under Wraps (1997).

He had a recurring role as M.J., a child who is HIV-positive, on Becker (1998−99). For his performance on Becker, Bailey received a Young Artist Award in 1999 for Best Performance in a TV Comedy Series by a Guest Starring Young Actor. In the Hallmark movie Little John (2002), Bailey was the eponymous title character, a young boy who was adopted by his grandfather (Ving Rhames). Bailey appeared in Dragonfly (2002), as a child who communicated with a dead woman after having a near-death experience. He portrayed Barris Hawkins, the nephew of Wanda Sykes' character, in sitcom Wanda at Large (2003).

Bailey played the role of Reggie in documentary What the Bleep Do We Know? (2005). He provided the voice of Wyborne "Wybie" Lovat in Coraline (2009), a role he reprised in the video game adaptation. Bailey's other film credits include Mission to Mars (2000), Bubble Boy (2001) and The Happening (2008).

He appeared in To Save a Life (2010) as Roger, a disabled friend of the protagonist who kills himself, and Roger's death is the focal point of the story. In 2014, Bailey was cast as intern Dr. Paul Cummings on medical drama The Night Shift. He continued playing the character until the series was cancelled in 2017. He played Chris Minetto, a police officer, in Emergence (2019−20). Bailey portrayed NASA astronaut Will Tyler in For All Mankind (2022).

== Filmography ==
=== Films ===
Year	Title	Role	Notes
1999	Jackie's Back	Wilson Wells	TV movie
2000	Mission to Mars	Bobby Graham	
2000	Baby Bedlam	Zeke	
2001	Bubble Boy	Neighborhood Boy	
2002	Dragonfly	Jeffrey Reardon	
2004	What the #$*! Do We (K)now!?	Reggie	Documentary
2006	What the Bleep!?: Down the Rabbit Hole	Reggie	Documentary
2008	The Happening	Jared	
2009	Coraline	Wyborne "Wybie" Lovat	Voice
2009	To Save a Life	Roger Dawson	
2010	High School	Jeffery	
2012	Model Minority	J.J.	
2013	From the Rough	Craig	
2019	Malibu Horror Story	Matt Thompson	
2022	Alone in the Dark	Cop #1	

=== Television ===
Year	Title	Role	Notes
1996	Nash Bridges	Jamal	"Javelin Catcher"
1997	Under Wraps	Boy in Park	TV movie
1997–1999	The Parent 'Hood	Jesse	4 episodes
1998	For Your Love	Kid	"The Games People Play"
1998	Silk Stalkings	Kevin	"Forever"
1998–1999	Becker	M.J. Johnson	3 episodes
1999	Jackie's Back	Wilson Wells	TV movie
1999–2000	Diagnosis Murder	C.J. Bentley-Livingston	3 episodes
2000	City of Angels	Rodney	2 episodes
2000	Touched by an Angel	Morgan	"Here I Am"
2000	Walker, Texas Ranger	Darvin Jackson	"Soldiers of Hate"
2000	The '70s	Jo-Jo	Mini-series
2001	Alias	Steven Dixon	"Doppelganger"
2001	The Practice	Lance Miller	"Suffer the Little Children"
2001	Too Legit: The MC Hammer Story	Young MC Hammer	TV movie
2002	Little John	LJ Morgan	TV movie
2002	ER	Pete Royson	"Dead Again"
2002	Presidio Med	Noah Tyler	"Secrets"
2003	The Guardian	Dee	"Where You Are"
2003	Oliver Bean	Floyd Gilbert	"Space Race"
2003	Wanda at Large	Barris Hawkins	4 episodes
2006	Behind the Camera: The Unauthorized Story of 'Diff'rent Strokes'	Gary Coleman	TV movie
2009	Raising the Bar	Deshaun Wagner	"Is There a Doctor in the House?"
2010	Memphis Beat	Rodney Rice	"Pork Salad Annie"
2010	CSI: Miami	Patrick Dawson	"Backfire"
2012	Criminal Minds	Shawn Parker (Student)	"The Wheels on the Bus..."
2013	Notes from Dad	Derek	TV movie
2014–2017	The Night Shift	Dr. Paul Cummings	Main cast, 45 episodes
2015	Edge	Benny	TV movie
2018	Snowflakes	Rbj	TV movie
2019	Shameless	Dr. Wild	"Lost"
2019–2020	Emergence	Chris Minetto	Main cast, 13 episodes
2022	All American: Homecoming	Ralph Wells	5 episodes
2022–2026	For All Mankind	Will Tyler	14 episodes
2025	Watson	Dean Kett	Episode: "The Dark Day Deduction"
2025	Pluribus	DHL Guy	Episode: “Grenade”

=== Video games ===
Year	Title	Role
2009	Coraline: The Game	Wyborne "Wybie" Lovat
