= Coraline (video game) =

2009 video game

- North America cover art
- Developers: Papaya Studio (PS2, Wii); Art Co. Ltd (NDS)
- Publisher: D3 Publisher
- Directors: Laurent Horisberger (PS2, Wii); Tsuyoshi Yagi (NDS)
- Producers: Tim Ramage; Jonathan Han (PS2, Wii)
- Designers: List: Chris Eddy (PS2, Wii); Dan Shocknesse (PS2, Wii); Khaled Elhout (PS2, Wii); Steve Bianchi (PS2, Wii); Toyoharu Moriyama (NDS); Aya Sakurai (NDS); Masumi Yanagawa (NDS)
- Programmers: List: Karl Lai (PS2, Wii); Jefferson Hobbs (PS2, Wii); Jordan Lehmiller (PS2, Wii); Geren Taylor (PS2, Wii); Valentinus Boentaran (PS2, Wii); Mitsunori Takemoto (NDS)
- Artists: Janry Burns (PS2, Wii); Toshihiro Hirosawa (NDS)
- Composer: Mark Watters (PS2, Wii)
- Engine: Havok (PS2, Wii)
- Platforms: PlayStation 2, Wii, Nintendo DS
- Release: NA: January 27, 2009
- Genre: Action-adventure
- Mode: Single-player

Coraline is a 2009 action-adventure game developed by Papaya Studio for the Wii and PlayStation 2 and by Art Co. Ltd. for the Nintendo DS. It was published by D3 Publisher to coincide with the theatrical release of Henry Selick's stop motion animated film adaptation of Neil Gaiman's 2002 novella of the same name. Players control the adventurous young Coraline Jones as she explores the Pink Palace and its grounds after her family moves in, performing chores, meeting eccentric neighbors, and discovering a hidden door leading to an enchanting yet sinister alternate world.

Gameplay revolves around exploration, fetch quests, and a variety of mini-games. The story closely follows the film's plot, with Coraline encountering her doting but button-eyed Other Mother and enjoying an idealized alternate life before uncovering its dark underbelly. The game received unfavorable reviews for its dated mechanics, repetitive tasks, inconsistent difficulty, technical issues, and short length, though the presentation and fidelity to the film were praised.

== Gameplay ==
Coraline and the Other Wybie outside the alternate Pink Palace in an example of gameplay from Coraline

Coraline is an action-adventure game that combines exploration with interactions that trigger mini-games, fetch quests, and puzzles to advance the story. The player controls Coraline as she roams the Pink Palace, interacts with her neglectful parents and quirky neighbors, and accesses the sinister Other World through a hidden door. A variety of mini-games drive progression, encompassing arcade-style activities like slingshot target shooting at pests, apples, or beehives, card matching, cooking pancakes, balancing on pipes, and music sequences requiring precise, non-rhythmic button inputs on the D-pad and face buttons. Collectible buttons serve as currency, earned from mini-games and spent to unlock outfits or purchase passes to skip challenging tasks. Some mini-games are optional for button farming, while others are mandatory, with repeatable versions available post-story. The Nintendo DS version supports D-pad or stylus controls, with the latter employed for navigation icons, climbing, and mini-games such as bug-smashing and musical sequences.

== Plot ==
The Jones family moves into the Pink Palace, an old house divided into apartments. Coraline Jones, an adventurous and often bored eleven-year-old, finds her parents, Mel and Charlie, preoccupied with their work producing gardening catalogs, leaving her largely unattended. Coraline explores the house and grounds, completing chores assigned by her parents. She meets her eccentric neighbors: Mr. Bobinsky, an acrobatic Russian who trains a mouse circus on the top floor, and retired actresses Miss Spink and Miss Forcible in the basement. The actresses warn her about a dangerous old well in the orchard. Coraline, intrigued, searches for the well with a makeshift dowsing rod and encounters Wybie Lovat, a local boy who annoys her but reveals the well's location. After a mundane evening, Coraline goes to bed.

That night, Coraline notices a button-eyed mouse resembling one from Mr. Bobinsky's circus and follows it to a small door in the living room. Passing through a tunnel, she emerges in an alternate version of the Pink Palace, known as the Other World. There, she meets her Other Mother (also called the Beldam), who has black buttons for eyes and dotes on her attentively. The Other Mother prepares lavish meals and encourages Coraline to participate in enjoyable activities, such as playing piano with her Other Father and engaging in hide-and-seek and a treasure hunt with a silent Other Wybie. Satisfied with the attention and delicious food, Coraline spends time in this idealized realm before going back to sleep. Coraline has a nightmare in which she pursues a frightened Wybie through a dark forest before he is eventually dragged into a well by a monstrous arm after his eyes are revealed as buttons.

Awakening alarmed in her real bedroom, Coraline attempts to warn her real mother but is dismissed. She ventures out, confronts Wybie, and reenters the Other World. There, she enjoys a feast, attends Other Bobinsky's spectacular mouse circus, and watches a theatrical performance by Other Spink and Other Forcible, in which she participates as the star. The Other Mother offers Coraline button eyes to make her stay permanent, which she refuses. The Other Wybie helps her escape through the tunnel, but back in the real world, Coraline finds her parents missing and realizes the Beldam has kidnapped them. With help from a black cat, who speaks in the Other World and guides her, she resolves to rescue them. Coraline proposes a game to the Beldam: if she can locate her parents and the souls (represented by ghost eyes) of three previous child victims, everyone will be freed; if she fails, she becomes the Beldam's daughter forever.

In the garden, Coraline evades the controlled Other Father, who sacrifices himself to give her the first eye as he falls into water. In the basement theater, she confronts grotesque taffy-like versions of Other Spink and Other Forcible, extracting the second eye from their grasp. In the attic circus, a rat steals the third eye, but the cat intervenes to recover it. The Other World unravels around her. In the final confrontation in the living room, Coraline deduces her parents' location and throws the cat at the Beldam, who claws out her button eyes. Coraline escapes through the tunnel, locks the door, and returns to the real world. Her parents reappear, and the family reunites over dinner. That night, Coraline apologizes to the cat for using him as a weapon and places the ghost children's eyes under her pillow to release their souls, restoring peace to her world.

== Development and release ==
D3 Publisher entered into an exclusive worldwide publishing agreement with Universal Pictures Digital Platforms Group on June 16, 2008, for video games based on the stop motion animated feature film Coraline, directed by Henry Selick and produced by Focus Features and Laika Entertainment. The film, adapted from Neil Gaiman's novel, was scheduled for theatrical release on February 6, 2009. All versions were produced by Tim Ramage of D3 Publisher's American branch.

The console versions were developed by Papaya Studios, with Laurent Horisberger acting as technical director and Jonathan Han serving as co-producer. The programming team was made up of Karl Lai, Jefferson Hobbs, Jordan Lehmiller, Geren Taylor, and Valentinus Boentaran. The game was designed by Chris Eddy, Dan Shocknesse, Khaled Elhout, and Steve Bianchi, using the Havok engine. Janry Burns served as art director, leading a team of James Weir, Chris Card, Eui Yong Kim, Richie Wu, and Josh Hak. The score was composed and produced by Mark Watters, and the sound effects were created by Tom Hite. The Nintendo DS version was handled by Art Co. Ltd. under the direction of Tsuyoshi Yagi. The Nintendo DS version's credits include lead programmer Mitsunori Takemoto, art director Toshihiro Hirosawa, and designers Toyoharu Moriyama, Aya Sakurai, and Masumi Yanagawa. The console version's voice actors were cast and directed by Eric Weiss, and include Dakota Fanning as Coraline, Keith David as the Cat, and Robert Bailey Jr. as Wybie, reprising their film roles. Other voice actors include Kath Soucie, Amanda Troop, JB Blanc, Susanne Blakeslee, and Dave Foquette. The Nintendo DS version features no voice acting.

On October 21, 2008, D3 Publisher specified releases for the Wii, Nintendo DS, and PlayStation 2, with a North American release planned for January 2009. The game was released in North American retail stores on January 27, 2009.

== Reception ==
Reception

Aggregate score
Aggregator	Score		
Aggregator	DS	PS2	Wii
Metacritic	50/100	39/100	42/100

Review scores
Publication	Score		
Publication	DS	PS2	Wii
GamePro	N/A	N/A	2.5/5
GameZone	4.5/10	5.3/10	6/10
IGN	N/A	2.5/10	2.5/10
The A.V. Club	N/A	N/A	D
Common Sense Media	N/A	2/5	2/5

According to review aggregation website Metacritic, the DS version received "mixed" reviews, while the PlayStation 2 and Wii versions received "unfavorable" reviews. Reviewers portrayed the title as a missed opportunity that is competent in presentation but undermined by uninspired mechanics, uneven difficulty, and a failure to translate the source material's sense of wonder and darkness into interactive form. It was deemed forgettable and suitable primarily for devoted fans of the franchise, with broader audiences advised to revisit the book or film instead.

Reviewers commended the game's visual and audio elements for faithfully recreating the aesthetic of the film. Dylan Platt of GameZone and Matt Cabral of GamePro credited the characters and settings for closely mirroring their cinematic counterparts despite hardware limitations, particularly on the PS2. Matt Casamassina of IGN acknowledged that the cutscenes incorporating storyboard sequences and an opening cinematic drawn from the movie made the atmosphere more authentic. Platt and Anise Hollingshead of GameZone regarded the audio to be the game's strongest quality, attributing the strong voice acting performances to reprisals of the film's cast, and Casamassina cited the voice acting as a factor in preserving the film's tone. Platt described the soundtrack as energetic, adventurous, and creepy, though he faulted the frequent looping in some songs.

Critics found the core experience dated, repetitive, and unengaging. Many reviewers noted the heavy reliance on fetch quests, simple puzzles such as block-pushing or picture-matching, and slingshot-based challenges, which felt familiar from earlier licensed games and lacked innovation. The Wii version drew particular criticism for awkward control choices, such as using the nunchuk analog stick for slingshot aiming instead of the Wii Remote pointer. The difficulty proved inconsistent, with some mini-games overly simplistic while others (such as timed sequences, music rhythm challenges requiring precise button inputs, or balance tasks) frustrated even adult players and seemed mismatched for the target audience of children. Platt and Casamassina cited technical shortcomings that compounded these flaws, including long and frequent loading times (exacerbated by unskippable door-opening cinematics) on the PS2 version, as well as game-crashing bugs that prevented completion in some cases.

The story was found to be fragmented and reliant on prior knowledge of the book or movie for coherence. The cutscenes and in-game events were said to gloss over key moments, leaving the narrative choppy and incomplete for newcomers. The game's brevity drew widespread comment, with completion times estimated at three to five hours, offering little incentive for replay beyond select mini-games. Hollingshead felt that some elements, such as collectible buttons and outfit changes, were underutilized or meaningless.

Angelina Sandoval of GameZone, reviewing the Nintendo DS version, critiqued the experience as predominantly tedious, with excitement emerging only late and in fleeting intervals, compounded by an absence of guidance that may frustrate younger players. She commended the graphics for faithfully replicating the film's distinctive aesthetic, rendering characters and environments effectively on the Nintendo DS. However, she faulted the audio for its repetitious musical snippets, adequate sound effects, and lack of voice acting.
