= Tennessee State Tigers and Lady Tigers =

Intercollegiate sports teams of Tennessee State University

- University: Tennessee State University
- NCAA: Division I (FCS)
- Conference: Ohio Valley Conference (primary); Horizon League (men's tennis)
- Athletic director: Mikki Allen
- Location: Nashville, Tennessee
- Varsity teams: 16 (8 men's and 8 women's)
- Football stadium: Nissan Stadium and Hale Stadium
- Basketball arena: Gentry Complex
- Softball stadium: Tiger Field
- Nickname: Tigers
- Colors: Reflex blue and white
- Mascot: Aristocat the Tiger
- Website: tsutigers.com
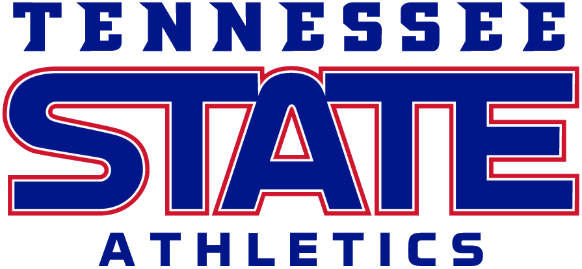

The Tennessee State Tigers and Lady Tigers are the intercollegiate athletic teams of Tennessee State University (TSU), located in Nashville, Tennessee, United States. The Tigers athletic program is a member of the Ohio Valley Conference (OVC) and competes in the NCAA Division I, including the Football Championship Subdivision. The women's track team is also known as the Tigerbelles. As a member of the Ohio Valley Conference, Tennessee State is one of three HBCUs competing in Division I that is not a member of an athletic conference made up entirely of historically black institutions (MEAC and SWAC), the other two being Hampton University and North Carolina A&T State University of the Coastal Athletic Association. The TSU mascot is Aristocat the Tiger, and the school colors are blue and white. TSU's main rival historically has been Kentucky State University, an HBCU located in the capital of Tennessee's northern neighbor.

== Sports sponsored ==
A member of the Ohio Valley Conference, Tennessee State University sponsors teams in eight men's and eight women's NCAA sanctioned sports and have plans for bringing back baseball.

The only TSU team that competes outside the OVC is the men's tennis team. After the 2021–22 season, the OVC merged its men's tennis league into that of the Horizon League. All OVC mean's tennis members, including TSU, became Horizon associates in that sport.

Men's sports	Women's sports
Basketball	Basketball
Cross country	Cross country
Football	Golf
Golf	Softball
Ice hockey	Tennis
Tennis	Track and field^{1}
Track and field^{1}	Volleyball
^{1} – includes both indoor and outdoor.

== Athletic facilities ==
Tennessee State is a member of the Ohio Valley Conference

Venue	Sport(s) hosted
Gentry Center	Basketball, indoor track and field
Nissan Stadium & Hale Stadium	Football
Tiger Stadium	Softball
TSU Tennis Court Complex	Tennis
Edward S. Temple Track	Outdoor track and field
Kean Hall	Volleyball

== Highlights ==
In 1957, coach John McClendon and three-time All-American Dick Barnett led the then-Tennessee Agricultural & Industrial State University to become the first historically black college (HBCU) to win a national basketball title, winning the National Association of Intercollegiate Athletics (NAIA) championship. The school went on to win the NAIA title again in 1958 and '59.

The women's track and field team won the championship of the Amateur Athletic Union national senior outdoor meet for all athletes 13 times in 1955–1960, 1962, 1963, 1965–1967, 1969 and 1978. The team likewise won the AAU national indoor championship 14 times in 1956–1960, 1962, 1965–1969 and 1978–1980.

By 2009, approximately 100 TSU football players had been drafted by the National Football League.

In 2014, From the Rough was released which is a movie based on a true story about the successes and challenges of the first African-American woman (Dr. Catana Starks) to coach a Division I college men's golf team. Starks helped develop several noteworthy golfers at Tennessee State such as Sean Foley and Robert Dinwiddie.

In 2016, the men's basketball team ranked 17th in the nation for increase in home attendance. During the 2015-2016 basketball season, the men's team tied the school record for the most Division I wins with 20.

The Southern Heritage Classic in Memphis, Tennessee is annually one of the largest and most anticipated HBCU football classics in the nation.
