= Steven Crowder =

American-Canadian political commentator (born 1987)

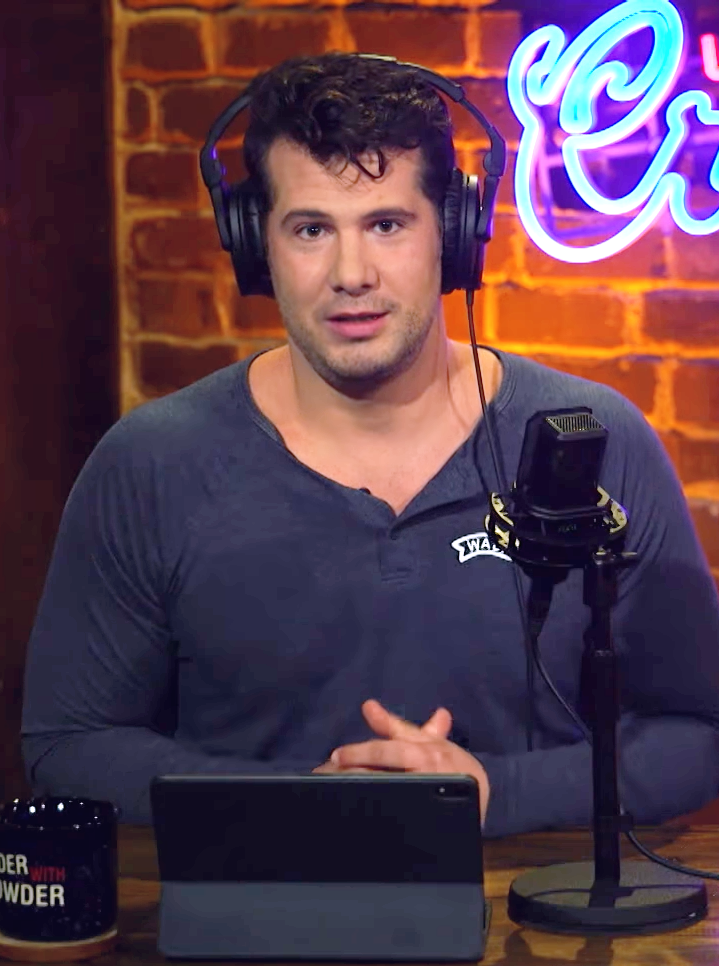
- Crowder in 2019
- Born: Steven Blake Crowder; July 7, 1987 (age 39); Detroit, Michigan, U.S.
- Citizenship: Canada; United States
- Occupations: Political commentator; media host
- Years active: 1999–2009 (actor); 2009–present (commentator)
- Political party: Republican
- Spouse: Hilary Korzon (m. 2012; sep. 2021)
- Children: 2

YouTube information
- Channel: StevenCrowder
- Years active: 2016–present
- Genres: Politics; opinion
- Subscribers: 5.88 million
- Views: 2.07 billion
- Last updated: June 16, 2026
- Website: louderwithcrowder.com

Steven Blake Crowder (/ˈkraʊdər/; born July 7, 1987) is an American-Canadian Christian Conservative comedian, political commentator, and media host.

Early in his career, Crowder worked for Fox News and posted videos on conservative media platforms. He then began hosting Louder with Crowder, a daily political podcast and YouTube channel with commentary segments. It includes a recurring segment called Change My Mind, in which Crowder invites passers-by to converse. In December 2012, Crowder, present alongside Americans for Prosperity, was punched in the face at a demonstration in Michigan concerning the state's recently passed right-to-work law.

Crowder's YouTube channel has been demonetized twice, first in 2019 after repeated use of racist and homophobic slurs. His channel was re-monetized after YouTube said Crowder addressed his behavior and content, and it was demonetized again in March 2021, with uploads suspended for a week, after violating YouTube's policy against advancing false claims about the integrity of the 2020 presidential election. YouTube suspended the channel again for two weeks in October 2022 for violating its harassment, threats and cyberbullying policy. Crowder's show is on Rumble.

== Early life ==
Crowder was born on July 7, 1987, in Detroit, Michigan, United States. He has an older brother named Jordan. His mother is French Canadian, and at the age of three, his family moved to Greenfield Park (now incorporated into Longueuil), a suburb of Montreal in Quebec, Canada, where he would live for the rest of his childhood.

Crowder attended Centennial Regional High School in Greenfield Park, and at the age of 18, he moved back to the United States. Crowder attended two semesters at Champlain College in Burlington, Vermont.

== Career ==
=== Early career and Fox News ===
At age 12, he worked as a voice actor. His most well-known role was as the character Alan "The Brain" Powers on the children's television series Arthur, for its fifth and sixth seasons. He began performing stand-up comedy at age 17. He then acted in a number of films, including the role of Doug Moore in the 2009 movie To Save a Life. From 2009 to 2012, Crowder worked for Fox News.

By 2009, Crowder regularly posted videos on politically conservative media, including Pajamas Media and later at Andrew Breitbart's Big Hollywood. Crowder served as the master of ceremonies at the 2011 Conservative Political Action Conference (CPAC), and generated some controversy with a rap video he premiered at CPAC 2012.

=== December 2012 union protest ===
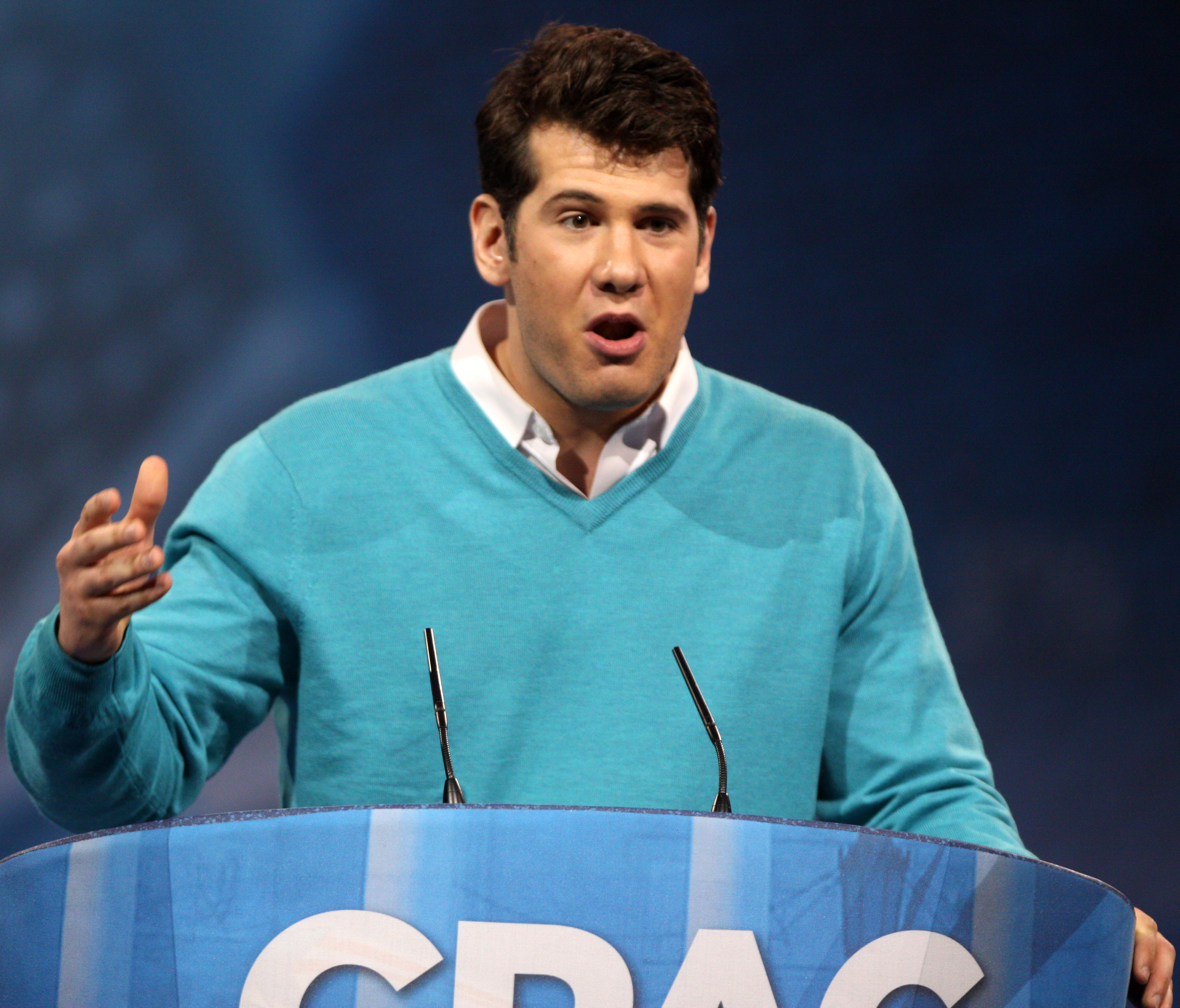
Crowder speaking at the 2013 Conservative Political Action Conference

At a December 2012 protest, Crowder was punched repeatedly in the face by a union member who claimed he was acting in self defense after being pushed to the ground.

Crowder and members of Americans for Prosperity were at a demonstration in Michigan concerning the state's recently passed right-to-work law. The incident began with an attempt by union activists to tear down the Americans for Prosperity tent, which was eventually successful. During the altercation, Crowder was punched several times by a union activist. Crowder posted an edited video of the incident to his YouTube channel that cut footage of the alleged assailant being pushed to the ground and getting back up, right before throwing the punches at Crowder. However, Fox News' broadcasts of the incident included footage of the man being pushed. The New York Times stated, "The same footage also shows that Mr. Crowder had his hand on that man's shoulder just before he tumbled to the ground, but, while the camera does not capture the whole sequence of events, it seems likely that the man was knocked to the ground as members of the two sides pushed against one other, not shoved down by Mr. Crowder." Crowder later released an unedited copy of the video.

An AFL–CIO spokesman, Eddie Vale, stated that the organization did not condone the tearing down of the Americans for Prosperity tent or the violence against Crowder and his group.

In March 2013, Ingham County Prosecutor Stuart Dunnings III declined to press charges against anyone involved in the December 2012 altercation. According to Dunnings, his office was originally sent an edited version of the video of Crowder's altercation. However, upon reviewing the unedited version, the prosecutor's office decided not to pursue the case because the union member had acted in self-defense.

=== Louder with Crowder ===
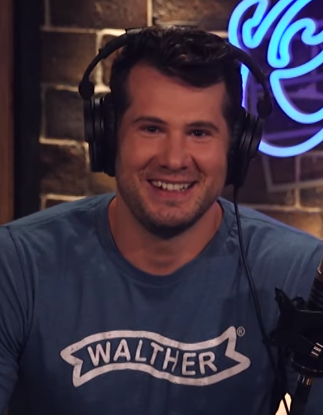
Crowder hosting Louder with Crowder, 2019

In October 2013, Fox News ended its relationship with Crowder. This was announced shortly after Crowder made negative statements about Fox News host Sean Hannity and about Fox News. In 2017, the Louder with Crowder program, featuring mainly comedic content and political commentary, became a daily program featured on Conservative Review's new streaming service, CRTV. On December 3, 2018, CRTV merged with Glenn Beck's TheBlaze, where Crowder was hosted until December 2022, alongside his YouTube channel, which has existed since 2009.

"Change My Mind" is a regular segment conducted by Crowder in which he sits at a table with a sign including the phrase "Change My Mind" and invites people walking by, often students at a university campus, to change his mind on a controversial subject. A photograph of Crowder seated behind a sign in February 2018 reading "Male Privilege is a Myth | Change My Mind" outside the Texas Christian University campus became an Internet meme. Variations of the meme often feature humorously controversial statements in place of "Male Privilege is a Myth", such as "Pineapple goes on pizza".

In 2018, Rebecca Lewis wrote a piece for Data and Society asserting that Crowder (and several other Rightist online personalities) were part of an online social network radicalizing people to the Far Right known as the Alternative Influence Network. Crowder and Carl Benjamin made a response video to Lewis’s piece.

Francesca Tripodi, a sociologist at the University of North Carolina at Chapel Hill, said that Crowder is "very popular, especially among young, conservative voters". Lewis told Bloomberg News that while Crowder does not directly express white nationalist views, his channel "has some of the most overt racism of any of the shows I've looked at". Crowder's channel faced similar criticism after he described CBS reporter Betty Yu's face as "aggressively Asian", with CBS and KPIX-TV condemning what they described as the "horrific, racist comments" and "demeaning Asian stereotypes" on his show.

"America Is Superior [To Every Other Country], Change My Mind"

Crowder's show has also seen success on Apple's podcast list, having remained on the top 100 list over the course of 2020. On YouTube, the Louder with Crowder podcast has 5.94 million subscribers and his secondary channel CrowderBits has approximately 1.21 million subscribers. In January 2022, Crowder accused Wikipedia of being biased towards the Left.

On September 11, 2025, Crowder claimed to receive a leaked e-mail from an officer at the Bureau of Alcohol, Tobacco, Firearms and Explosives that the gun casings of Charlie Kirk's shooter had "engraved wording on them expressing transgender and anti-fascist ideology." He would later report that his company was being subpoenaed over the leak from ATF.

In July 2026, Crowder released a video entitled “The Case for Fascism”. In the video, Crowder said fascist violence throughout history has been necessary to force elected socialists and communists out of office. Crowder claimed that Augusto Pinochet “cleaned up [Chile]” economically and that under Pinochet's rule, “If you weren’t a communist, you weren’t at great risk.” Crowder said that fascism was an appropriate response to the spread of communism, and suggested that the United States needed fascism to stop communists from “trying to destroy the country.” Crowder additionally said “And just to be clear, this does not mean that I am supportive of or justifying everyone in the fascist response. That’s not what I’m saying. I’m trying to provide you with some historical context.”

=== Dispute with The Daily Wire ===
In January 2023, Crowder revealed on Louder with Crowder that he had received a term sheet from a conservative media outlet that he left unnamed. Crowder listed the offer's stipulations that, if he were to be demonetized or removed from platforms such as YouTube, Facebook or the iTunes Store, his payment would be cut substantially during that period. He criticized this as a symptom of right-wing media not fighting back against, but rather implicitly condoning, what he considered censorship by Big Tech, stating that "Big Tech is in bed with Big Con".

It was later confirmed that the unnamed media outlet was The Daily Wire. Jeremy Boreing, the CEO of The Daily Wire, claimed Crowder had misrepresented the terms of the offer and that the Daily Wire would have paid Crowder $50 million over four years. Furthermore, Boreing asserted that the stipulation was necessary to ensure profitability.

On March 3, 2023, Crowder announced on Russell Brand's show that he would be moving his show to Rumble. In August 2023, Vanity Fair reported that the show's viewership on Rumble was declining following the dispute with Daily Wire as well as other controversies and lawsuits over sexual harassment. Crowder announced he was partnering with Alex Jones, as well as comedians Nick Di Paolo, Josh Firestine, and Bryan Callen, to offer an expanded version of his Mug Club to be streamed via Rumble.

== Controversies ==
=== Alleged violations of online policies ===
In June 2019, YouTube investigated Crowder for his use of racist and homophobic slurs towards Carlos Maza in multiple videos reacting to the Vox series Strikethrough, which Maza hosts. Crowder referred to Maza using homophobic slurs and mocked his voice while sometimes wearing an offensive shirt. Maza criticized YouTube for not providing enough protection against alleged harassment. Vox Media's The Verge published an article stating that Crowder's videos "routinely contain egregious violations of YouTube's policies against cyberbullying". Crowder responded with a video where he said his use of slurs was "playful ribbing" on his show and that he is opposed to doxxing and harassment.

While YouTube acknowledged that Crowder's language was hurtful, it initially concluded that "the videos as posted don't violate our policies", determining Crowder had not encouraged his viewers to harass or dox Maza and that the main point of his video was to respond to opinion. The decision to not suspend the channel drew considerable criticism. The next day, YouTube suspended the channel's monetization, describing the objectionable content as "a pattern of egregious actions harmed the broader community". The reversal of the decision not to suspend the channel drew considerable criticism as well. In August 2020, YouTube re-monetized some of Crowder's content on the site, stating that Crowder's content had since become compliant with YouTube policy.

Crowder announced in February 2021 that he filed a lawsuit against Facebook, alleging he was unfairly censored by the platform. The next month, YouTube suspended Crowder's channel for one week claiming that he violated the presidential election integrity policy by advancing false claims about the 2020 United States presidential election in Nevada and again indefinitely demonetized his account. His account was then given a second strike on the platform for "reveling in or mocking" the killing of Ma'Khia Bryant , who had charged at another person with a knife and was shot by a police officer, in a video he posted. Crowder responded by announcing that he had filed a lawsuit against YouTube seeking an injunction.

In October 2022, Crowder's YouTube channel was suspended for two weeks for violating its policy on harassment, threats and cyberbullying. In response, Crowder stated that the suspension constituted election interference because his content is political in nature, he has a large viewership, and the timing of the suspension lasted through the November 2022 midterm election day. In May 2023, Crowder's channel was suspended again after having posted an episode of Louder with Crowder that featured Alex Jones as guest host, as it violated policies prohibiting videos created or hosted by personalities whose accounts have been terminated.

=== Treatment of colleagues and spouse ===
In July 2023, Mediaite reported numerous allegations of bullying and sexual misconduct against Crowder by five former employees. Crowder's behaviour also included unsolicited sexting, angry outbursts, indecent exposure, and inappropriate jokes. In response to the allegations CEO of Louder with Crowder Gerald D. Morgan said in a statement: "While Louder with Crowder does not provide details on personal, private medical matters or personnel issues, it is important to note that many of these claims are missing context, clear misrepresentations or outright falsehoods".

In a 2023 video, Crowder appeared to express distaste for his wife's legal ability to divorce him without his consent. Shortly after Crowder's announcement, journalist Yashar Ali released a video he claimed was given to him by Hilary which shows Crowder verbally abusing Hilary while she was pregnant. In the video, Crowder berated Hilary for failing to perform her "wifely duties" and told her to "fucking watch it" when she accused him of abuse.

== Personal life ==
Crowder is a Christian. He married Hilary Korzon in August 2012 and wrote about the benefits he perceived in remaining abstinent before marriage. In August 2021, Hilary gave birth to twins, a son and a daughter. In April 2023, Crowder stated on his channel that his wife had filed for divorce in 2021.

In July 2021, Crowder underwent a surgical operation in which titanium bars were inserted into his chest in order to counteract his congenital condition of pectus excavatum (sunken chest). The surgery caused fluid to accumulate in his lungs, which he called "excruciatingly painful". Several weeks later, he was transported to a hospital due to a collapsed lung.

== Filmography ==
Year	Film	Role	Notes
1999	The Bone Collector	Extra	
2000–2001	Arthur	Alan 'The Brain' Powers	Voice
2000	Arthur's Perfect Christmas	Alan 'The Brain' Powers	Voice
2001	Two Summers	Friend	
2002	Sagwa, the Chinese Siamese Cat	Mung	Voice
2005	3 Needles	Depanneur Manager	
2006	The Covenant	Party Kid	
2007	The Secret	Classroom Boy	
2008	Bend & Break	Blake	
2008	The Velveteen Rabbit	Baseball Boy #1	
2008	Greek	Jace	
2009	To Save a Life	Doug Moore	
