= David Wachs =

American actor and musician (born 1980)

- Wachs in 2026
- Born: July 25, 1980 (age 46); Palm Desert, California, U.S.
- Occupations: Actor, musician
- Years active: 2002–present

David Wachs (born July 25, 1980) is an American actor and musician. He was born and raised in Palm Desert, California to parents who were both musicians. He has appeared in several TV shows, including ER, Living with Fran, and Still Standing, as well as in films such as Hotel California (2008), and The Last Hurrah (2009), among others.
