= Catana Starks =

American athletic coach (1944–2020)

- Catana Starks, from a 1998 newspaper
- Born: Catana Rhoda Johnson; December 30, 1944; Mobile, Alabama, USA
- Died: September 6, 2020 (aged 75); Nashville, Tennessee, USA
- Occupation: Athletics coach
- Years active: 1980-2000s
- Known for: Golf coach, Tennessee State University
- Notable work: First African-American woman to coach an all-men’s team at the collegiate level

Catana Rhoda Johnson Starks (December 30, 1944 – September 6, 2020) was an American athletics coach. She was the first African-American woman to coach a men's team at the collegiate level, when she coached the men's golf team at Tennessee State University from 1986 to 2005.

== Early life ==
Catana Johnson was born in Mobile, Alabama. She graduated from Tennessee State University, where one of her classmates was Olympian Wilma Rudolph. She earned a doctorate from Tennessee State in 1989, with a dissertation titled "An analysis of three methods of teaching physical fitness and their effect on strength, flexibility, and cardiovascular endurance" (1989).

== Career ==
Starks coached high school swimming and basketball in Saginaw, Michigan in the 1970s. She became a swimming and diving coach at Tennessee State in 1980. She became head coach of the school's new golf program in 1986, the first African-American woman to coach a men's golf team at the highest collegiate level. She coached the men's golf team at Tennessee State from 1986 to 2005; her efforts to boost the team's profile included recruiting international students, which caused some controversy, especially in the 1998 season, when the team had only one African-American player. In her last year as coach, the team won the National Minority Golf Championship. Her former players included Canadian golfer Sean Foley, who in turn coached Tiger Woods, and Scottish golfer Robert Dinwiddie. She was also head of the Human Performance and Sports Sciences department at Tennessee State.

Starks' life story was dramatized in a film, From the Rough (2011), starring Taraji P. Henson as Starks. In 2014, Starks was inducted into the National Black College Alumni Hall of Fame.

== Personal life ==
Catana Rhoda Johnson married Alfred Donnie Starks in 1964 and had a son. She later remarried. Starks died in 2020, aged 75 years, in Nashville, Tennessee.
