= Lena Jane Fry =

Canadian-American writer (1850–1938)

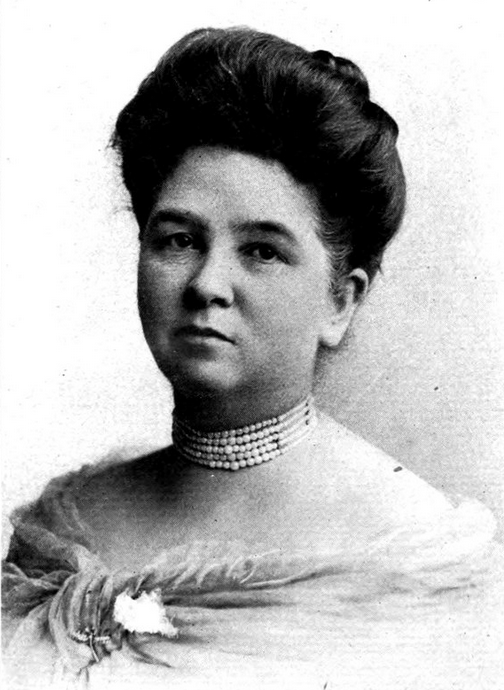
- Lena Jane Fry, from a 1905 publication
- Born: Selena Jane Hawke; March 6, 1850; Hawkesville, Ontario, Canada
- Died: October 26, 1938 (aged 88); Chicago, Illinois, U.S.
- Occupation: Writer
- Children: 5, including Nena Blake

Lena Jane Hawke Fry (March 6, 1850 – October 26, 1938) was a Canadian-born American writer. Her Other Worlds (1905) is considered an early utopian novel by a North American woman.

== Biography ==
Selena Hawke was born in Hawkesville, Ontario, the daughter of Gabriel Hawke and Jane Machell Hawke. Both of her parents were born in the United States; her father was a lawyer and a local official in Waterloo County. She married Stephen Fry in 1870, and had five children (one son died in infancy). They divorced in 1894.

In 1907, Fry was drawn into a public controversy when her daughter, actress Nena Blake, refused to marry a suitor who spent extravagantly, either on building or destroying her stage career. Nena Blake achieved some Broadway success before she died in 1924. Fry died in 1938, at the age of 88, in Chicago.

== Publications ==
Fry's utopian novel Other Worlds (1905) is set in a communitarian colony on a planet named Herschel, after William Herschel. The book was dedicated to her three daughters.

- Other Worlds: A Story Concerning the Wealth Earned by American Citizens and Showing How It Can Be Secured to Them Instead of to the Trusts (1905)
- "What the Mother Says" (1907)
