= Grizzly Park =

- Directed by: Tom Skull
- Written by: Tom Skull
- Produced by: Belle Avery; Jeanne Stack
- Starring: Glenn Morshower Emily Foxler; Julie Skon; Kaveen Reece; Zulay Henao
- Cinematography: Matt Cantrell
- Edited by: Bob Mori
- Music by: Anthony Marinelli
- Distributed by: American World Pictures (AWP)
- Release date: February 7, 2008
- Country: United States
- Language: English

Grizzly Park is a 2008 American horror film written and directed by Tom Skull. The film stars Randy Wayne, Emily Baldoni, Julie Skon, Zulay Henao, Shedrack Anderson III, Kavan Reece, Jelynn Rodriguez, and Trevor Peterson as eight teenagers forced to complete a week of community service at a national forest, during which they are hunted by a vicious Kodiak brown bear, played by Brody the Bear in his film debut. Glenn Morshower, Whitney Cummings, and Rance Howard appear in supporting roles.

Grizzly Park was released on February 8, 2008. The film received negative reviews from critics. A sequel is in development.

== Plot ==
A serial killer, Butch (Jeff Watson), escapes prison and murders an officer, before posing as his victim so he can disappear in the remote Grizzly Park. To keep his cover, Butch picks up eight troubled young teenagers who are inducted into a rehabilitation program, in Grizzly Park, to serve a week of community service for their respective misdemeanors: Michael 'Scab' White (Randy Wayne) is a white supremacist; Lola (Zulay Henao) is a Mexican tomboy; Bebe (Emily Foxler) is ditzy and dimwitted; Ty (Shedrack Anderson III) is a computer wiz; Candy (Julie Skon) is a shallow "it girl;" Ryan (Kavan Reece) is a spoiled rich kid; KiKi (Jelynn Rodriguez) is also spoiled and shallow; and Trickster (Trevor Peterson) is mostly concerned with pulling pranks. Arriving at Grizzly Park, the group meet Ranger Bob (Glenn Morshower) and Ranger Mike (Ryan Culver). Ranger Bob sets off with the group into the park, while Ranger Mike stays with Butch, who quickly stabs him to death before entering the park himself. However Butch is soon attacked and killed by a large Grizzly bear (Brody the Bear).

Through their hike, the miscreant youths are given an opportunity to seek redemption; however this fails, as the group ignore Ranger Bob and instead spend the majority of the hike lusting after each other. Ty and Kiki sneak off from the group, but Ty becomes stuck in a wolf trap. His blood attracts a wolf which kills and devours KiKi, before the grizzly bear kills Ty. The rest of the group reach the main camping site where they spend the night.

In the morning, when Ty and KiKi have not arrived, Ranger Bob goes looking for them, leaving the group at the camp where they continue to lust for each other. At night, after hours of searching, Ranger Bob discovers the gory remains of Ty and KiKi, and begins to rush back to the camp, where the group are having a campfire. Scab leaves the group and inhales gas, while Trickster dresses up in a bear costume to scare the others. While Scab is on a drug trip, the bear attacks and kills him, his death going unnoticed due to Trickster's prank. However, soon after the bear kills two more of the group, decapitating Trickster and mauling Lola in half.

Ryan, Candy and Bebe take shelter in a shed, but the bear attacks. Thinking the bear has left, Ryan opens a hatch; however the bear drags him out and mauls him to death. Candy and Bebe attempt to pull him back in, but his arms are torn from his body, killing him. Sometime later, the bear attacks the shed once more. Bebe escapes while closing the door at Candy's face, leaving her to be killed by the bear.

The following morning, Ranger Bob returns to find an upset Bebe. As Bebe prepares to leave the camp, Ranger Bob overhears her making a call to her friend telling her she had manipulated Ranger Bob and planned to murder him with Lola's gun. As Bebe leaves the cabin, she encounters the bear and it kills her by ripping her breast implant out. Afterwards, a news reporter (Whitney Cummings) is seen explaining the murders to be at the hands of Butch, who supposedly dressed up as a bear and killed the victims before escaping. It is revealed that Ranger Bob, in fact, trained the bear to kill the members of the group who had not learned from their previous mistakes.

== Cast ==
- Brody the Bear as the Grizzly bear
- Glenn Morshower as Ranger Bob
- Emily Foxler as Bebe
- Julie Skon as Candy
- Kavan Reece as Ryan
- Zulay Henao as Lola
- Randy Wayne as Michael 'Scab' White
- Trevor Peterson as Trickster
- Shedrack Anderson III as Ty
- Jelynn Rodriguez as KiKi
- Whitney Cummings as Tiffany Stone
- Rance Howard as Ranger Howard
- Susan Blakely as Unhappy Camper
- Ryan Culver as Ranger Mike
- Jeff Watson as Butch
- Jerry Sword as Jerry
- Erik Hollander as newscaster (voice)
- Jared Holmberg as Kiki's little brother

== Sequel ==
Since 2014, the sequel Grizzly Park II is in development. The film is produced and written by Belle Avery. The film is set in Virginia and will be filmed in Southwest Virginia.
