= Julia X =

- Film poster
- Directed by: P.J. Pettiette
- Written by: Matt Cunningham
- Story by: P.J. Pettiette
- Produced by: Bret Stern
- Starring: Valerie Azlynn; Kevin Sorbo; Alicia Leigh Willis; Joel David Moore; Ving Rhames
- Cinematography: Jason Goodman
- Edited by: Rob Neal
- Music by: Akira Yamaoka
- Production companies: 21st Century 3D; Dixie Theatrical Corporation
- Distributed by: United Front Entertainment
- Release date: September 24, 2011
- Running time: 92 minutes
- Country: United States
- Language: English

Julia X is a 2011 American 3D comedy horror film starring Valerie Azlynn, Kevin Sorbo, Alicia Leigh Willis, Joel David Moore and Ving Rhames.

== Cast ==
- Valerie Azlynn as Julia
  - Saxon Sharbino as Young Julia
- Kevin Sorbo as The Stranger
- Alicia Leigh Willis as Jessica
  - Meg Rains as Young Jessica
- Joel David Moore as Sam
- Ving Rhames as The Man
- Gregg Brazzel as The Father
- Cassie Shea Watson as Young Julia's Mother
- Kasi Scarbrough Corley as The Dead Woman
- Sarah Duncan as The Jogger
- Courtney Rawls as Roxanne
- Brad Rachal as Young Sister's Brother
