= Carlos Maza =

American journalist and video producer (born 1988)

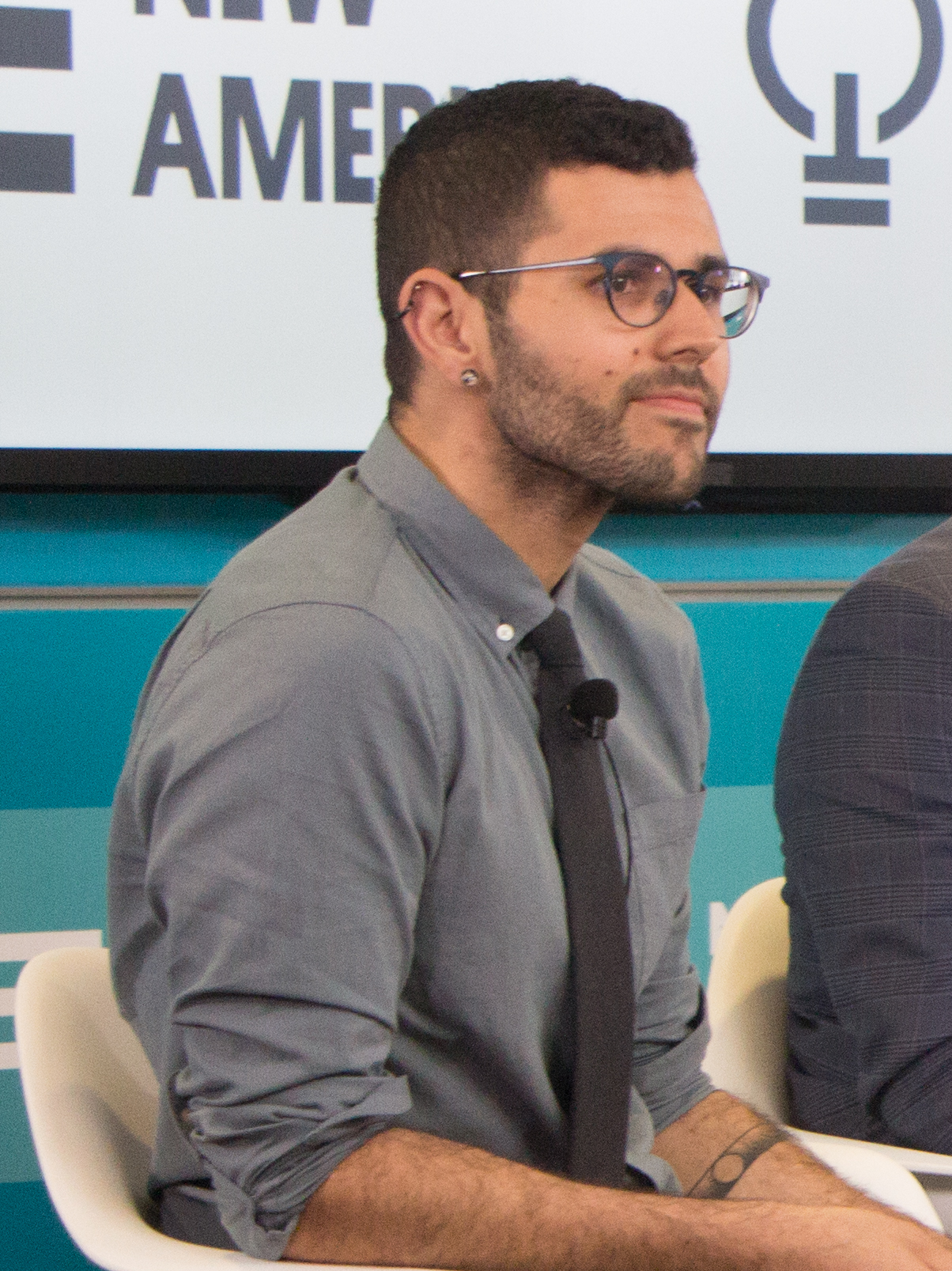
- Maza in 2018
- Born: Carlos Manuel Maza; April 9, 1988 (age 38)
- Education: Wake Forest University (BA)
- Occupations: Video producer, political activist
- Employers: Media Matters for America (2011–2016); Vox Media (2016–2020)
- Maza's voice
- Website: www.carlosmmaza.com

Carlos Manuel Maza (born April 9, 1988) is an American journalist and video producer who started the Vox series Strikethrough. The Columbia Journalism Review described him as "Brian Stelter meets NowThis".

== Early and personal life ==
Maza was born on April 9, 1988. His parents were immigrants from Cuba, and he has three younger siblings, a sister and two half-brothers. Maza frequently played video games as a child, and his mother described him as smart but introverted.

Maza attended Christopher Columbus High School in Westchester, Florida, where he joined the debate club. According to Maza, the debate club gave him the confidence to speak out and be himself, and he later described it as "the most meaningful thing that's ever happened to me". Maza graduated from Wake Forest University in 2010 with a BA in political science. He is a member of the Democratic Socialists of America.

== Career ==
Maza worked at Media Matters for America from 2011 to 2016, where he was a research fellow and created a video series on media criticism. At Media Matters, he was also the LGBT Program Director, focusing on combating misinformation and working for LGBTQ equality. He then began working at Vox, where he successfully proposed Strikethrough and began producing and hosting the series.

In June 2019, YouTube investigated conservative commentator Steven Crowder for repeatedly using racist and homophobic slurs against Maza over the course of multiple years in videos reacting to Strikethrough. Maza said that Crowder's fans have doxxed and harassed him as a result of Crowder's videos. Crowder responded that his videos are meant as comedy and that he is opposed to doxxing and harassment. Four days later, YouTube stated that Crowder's language was "hurtful" but did not violate its policies and would not be removed from the site. The decision drew considerable criticism and, on the next day, shortly after revising its policy on hate speech, YouTube decided to suspend Crowder's ability to run ads or monetize his videos until Crowder addressed "all of the issues" with his channel.

Strikethrough was canceled in July 2019, and Maza moved from Vox's video team to a new creative role directly under Vox publisher Melissa Bell. In late January 2020, Maza announced that he would leave Vox. In February 2020, after leaving Vox, Maza started a media-critique channel on YouTube. In an interview with Business Insider, Maza voiced his dissatisfaction with YouTube while also stating that he "might as well flood its airwaves with leftist propaganda" by returning to the platform as an independent creator. In 2023, Sam Kern nominated a YouTube video by Maza for Sight and Sound's video essay poll: "The 'Pay For It' Scam". Kern reviewed that Maza's career experience allows him to combine "professionalism" with "casualness" and that his conclusions to videos excel.
