= Tootsie Guevarra =

Filipino recording artist, actress, and television host (born 1980)

- Born: Emma Therese Pinga; August 17, 1980 (age 46); Manila, Philippines
- Genres: Pop; OPM
- Occupations: Singer; Actress
- Instrument: Vocals
- Years active: 1990–2000; 2014; 2018; 2026
- Labels: Sunshine Records (1990); Tiger Records (1992); Star Music (1997–2000)

Tootsie Guevarra (born Emma Theresa Pinga, August 17, 1980) is a Filipino former recording artist, actress, and television host.

== Early life and education ==
Tootsie Guevarra graduated in 2003 with a Hotel Restaurant and Management degree from TESDA.

== Career ==
On October 11, 2014, she appeared as a guest on ASAP's concert in Los Angeles to perform her hit songs while being accompanied by Toni and Alex Gonzaga. This marked her first television performance since her retirement from the entertainment industry. In 2018, she released a song titled "Iisa Lang" under composer Vehnee Saturno's music label marking her first music release since returning into the music industry.

== Personal life ==
Guevarra married Jansen Cunanan on August 8, 2005 at the Santuario de San Antonio in Makati City; the two had met in August 2001 during a taping of her ASAP performance in Olongapo City, where she was introduced to Cunanan by Geneva Cruz. They later moved to the United States where they went on to have a son but eventually separated. By 2012, she remarried to Mike Monaco, an Italian-American marketing executive in the healthcare industry; she revealed her new marriage during a 2013 interview with TFC's Balitang America, with the couple also expecting their first child by June 2013.

Guevarra is a relative of Jojo Pinga, a painter based in Marikina who collaborated with Mayor Bayani Fernando in creating the city's symbols in the 1990s.

== Filmography ==
=== Television ===
Year	Title	Role	Ref(s)
2026	Nurse the Dead	Zeny	

== Discography ==
=== Albums ===
Year	Title	Label
1990	Tootsie	Sunshine Records
1992	Stranger	Tiger Records
1997	Really Wanna Tell You	Star Music
1999	Kaba	Star Music
2000	Sa Puso Ko	Star Music
2002	Sa Puso Ko (Deluxe Edition)	Star Music
2013	Best of Tootsie Guevarra	Star Music

=== Compilation appearances ===
Year	Album	Song(s)	Label(s)
1997	Sa Araw ng Pasko	"Oh! Christmas Time"	Star Music
