= Jelynn Malone =

Filipino-American actress (born 1983)

- Born: Jelynn Sophia Aguilar Rodriguez; August 13, 1983 (age 43); San Diego, California, U.S.
- Other names: Jelynn Sophia; Jelynn Rodriguez
- Citizenship: Filipino-American
- Occupation: Actor
- Years active: 2005–present

Jelynn Malone (born August 31, 1983) (also known as Jelynn Sophia and Jelynn Rodriguez) is a Filipino-American actress, dancer and singer, who was formerly the host of the American Sí TV show The Drop. She has worked in show business since she was a teenager attending Rancho Bernardo High School. On television, Jelynn was a host on the TV Guide Channel, and she appeared on CBS's pilot Three (2005). She also hosted the San Diego TV show, The Beat (2003–2004).

In late 2005, Jelynn shot her first movie to be released sometime in 2007, Bar Starz. She plays Melanie, one of the leads in this movie about "the adventures of some seriously odd club denizens."

Jelynn can be seen in the horror film Grizzly Park playing the character KiKi. Grizzly Park was released in Fall 2007.

Jelynn is starring in a new Internet show called Engaged.

She can be seen in an episode of NBC's hit drama Las Vegas.

She stars in her first Filipino television series Nurse the Dead playing the character Noa Reyes, which is streaming on iWant in June 2026.
