= Valerie Azlynn =

American actress

- Azlynn in 2022
- Born: Valerie Asselin; November 25, 1980 (age 45); New London, Connecticut, U.S.
- Occupation: Actress
- Years active: 1998–present

Valerie Azlynn (born Valerie Asselin; November 25, 1980) is an American actress. She has appeared in several television shows and movies, notably starring in the TV comedy Sullivan & Son.

== Early life ==
Azlynn was born Valerie Asselin and raised in New London, Connecticut. She attended The Williams School and Waterford High School, and had open-heart surgery to repair an atrial septal defect at age 13.

On March 4, 1993, Azlynn's successful open heart surgery was performed, and it changed her life and her appearance forever. She started working with the Mended Little Hearts non-profit as their national spokesperson in 2013, where she works to help kids who had open heart surgery get beyond the stigma that comes from the unsightly scars.

Valerie moved to New York City after high school at the age of 17. She studied acting for two years at the New York Conservatory for Dramatic Arts (formerly the School for Film and Television).

== Career ==
Azlynn moved to New York City at age 17 to pursue a career as an actress, building her résumé by performing in the theater and singing with an opera company in Manhattan, New York. She later moved to Los Angeles.

In 2004, Azlynn landed a supporting role in The Joe Schmo Show as Piper "The Bachelorette." She has since appeared in episodes of Hot in Cleveland, Cold Case, CSI: NY, The Big Bang Theory, Two and a Half Men, Rules of Engagement, How I Met Your Mother, Joey, iCarly, The Loop, Mr. Sunshine, and many others. From 2012 through 2014, Azlynn starred as Melanie on the TBS comedy Sullivan & Son.

Azlynn has appeared in roles on the big screen, including in Poseidon and Tropic Thunder, among others. In some early movies, Azlynn appeared under the name Valerie Asselin.

== Filmography ==
=== Film ===
Year	Title	Role	Notes
1998	Mystic Nights and Pirate Fights	Steelway's Girlfriend	
2002	Late	Girlfriend	Short film
2003	The Bar	The Bartender / Judy Gillman	
2004	Arizona	Tina	
2005	Constantine	Angel	
2005	Bewitched	Gorgeous Model	
2006	I'm Reed Fish	Kate Peterson	
2006	Poseidon	Passenger #1	
2006	Broken	Jessica	
2008	Tropic Thunder	Damien's Assistant – Vietnam Crew	
2009	The Last Hurrah	Nicole	
2009	Surrogates	Bridget	
2010	The Third Rule	Karen	Short film
2011	Good News, Oklahoma!	Barbara	Short film
2011	Julia X	Julia	
2012	Caroline and Jackie	Michelle	
2013	Playdate	Val	
2013	The Little Rascals Save the Day	Miss Crabtree	Direct-to-video film
2014	Nevermore	Jennifer Thomas	
2017	Cupid's Proxy	Rebecca	

=== Television ===
Year	Title	Role	Notes
2004	Spellbound	Trina Miller	Television movie
2004	10-8: Officers on Duty	Amber	Episode: "Flirtin' with Disaster"
2004	The Joe Schmo Show	Piper	Main role (season 2); 9 episodes
2005	Life on a Stick	Allison	Episode: "Gangs of the Mall"
2005	Joey	Candace	Episodes: "Joey and the Poker", "Joey and the Musical"
2006	Two and a Half Men	Beth	Episode: "That Special Tug"
2006	The Loop	Jolie	Episode: "The Tiger Express"
2006	One on One	Rachel	Episode: "California Girl"
2006	CSI: NY	Eve Demming	Episode: "Not What It Looks Like"
2006	How I Met Your Mother	Dawn	Episode: "World's Greatest Couple"
2006–2007	Smith	Cindy	2 episodes
2008	Welcome to the Captain	Astrid	Main role
2008	Unhitched	Sulu	Episode: "Conjoined Twins Pitch No-Hitter"
2008	Rules of Engagement	Stacy	Episode: "Optimal Male"
2009	The Big Bang Theory	Alicia	Episode: "The Dead Hooker Juxtaposition"
2009	Cold Case	Sharon Lertola (1963)	Episode: "November 22"
2009	The Ex List	Sara	Episode: "Flower King"
2009–2010	iCarly	Veronica	2 episodes (uncredited)
2011	Perfectly Prudence	Angelica Adams	Television movie
2011	Mr. Sunshine	Jessie	Episode: "Lingerie Football"
2011	Friends with Benefits	Kristen	Episode: "The Benefit of the Unspoken Dynamic"
2011	Hot in Cleveland	Libby	Episode: "Elka's Choice"
2011–2012	Castle	Officer Ann Hastings/Lone Vengeance	3 episodes
2012	Southland	Jen Miller	Episode: "Risk"
2012–2014	Sullivan & Son	Melanie Sutton	Main role; 33 episodes
2013	Remember Sunday	Jolene	Television movie
2015	2 Broke Girls	Romy	Episode: "And The Maybe Baby"
2017	Nanny Seduction	Alyssa	Television movie
2017	A Deadly Affair	Susan	Television movie
2019–2020	Schooled	Julie	Recurring role; 10 episodes
