= Randy Wayne =

American actor (born 1981)

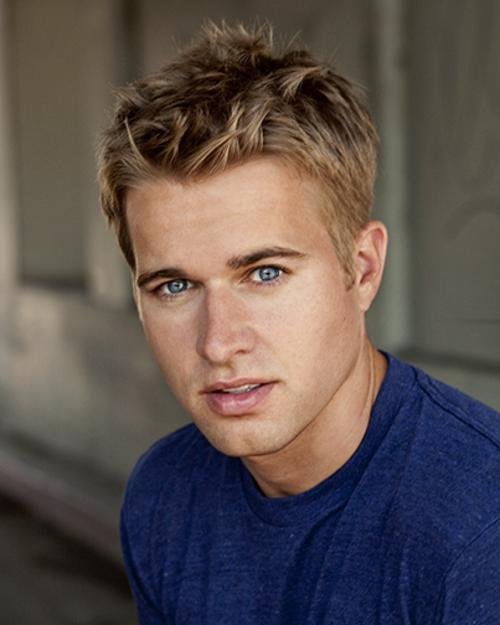
- Randy Wayne
- Born: Randy Wayne Frederick; August 7, 1981 (age 43); Moore, Oklahoma, U.S.
- Occupation: Actor
- Years active: 2002–present

Randy Wayne Frederick (born August 7, 1981) is an American actor.

== Life and career ==
Wayne was born and raised in Moore, Oklahoma. He attended Moore High School and Campbellsville University.

He appeared on the 2002 season of the British reality show Shipwrecked, which led to guest appearances on the television shows The Closer, Huff, NCIS, Jack & Bobby, and Numbers as well as a series regular role as the not-so-bright teenager Jeff Fenton on the 2006 ABC sitcom Sons & Daughters. In 2006, Wayne starred as Robbie Zirpollo in the film The Surfer King.

He is most famous for his portrayal of Luke Duke in the film The Dukes of Hazzard: The Beginning. Since then he has starred in numerous independent features including the gay-themed drama Dream Boy, Grizzly Park, and Foreign Exchange. He also portrayed Michael in The Haunting of Molly Hartley, The Last Hurrah, and Ghost Town (a 2009 Syfy Channel horror film, not to be confused with the 2008 Ricky Gervais film of the same name). He starred in the lead role of Jake Taylor in To Save a Life, which was released to theaters on January 22, 2010. Wayne also starred as Duffy in the film Frat Party.

He starred opposite Matthew Modine in the 20th Century Fox film, The Trial, released in 2010. His latest appearance was on Talent, a web series from the producers of Pretty Little Liars, as Gabe on www.thetalentshow.com. He also guest starred on The Secret Life of the American Teenager as Frank for four episodes. Wayne also appeared on The Lying Game as Justin Miller, a boy that Laurel was seriously dating but broke up with because he was using Laurel to get revenge on her father, Ted, a surgeon who operated on his mother that died on the operating table.

In 2011, Wayne starred as Dick in the film Cougar Hunting. He also starred in the 2011 film Honey 2 co-starring Katerina Graham. In 2011, he played a side character named 'Matt' in HBO's True Blood for two episodes. In 2012, Wayne starred as a young skater named Caleb in the film Hardflip. He also starred as Johnny in the horror film Hold Your Breath co-starring Katrina Bowden. Wayne had a role as Luke in the film Heart of the Country. In 2013, he starred as Cyrus Rothwell in the crime film The Freemason. In 2014, Wayne had roles in the films Android Cop, where he played the role of Android Cop and Mantervention.

In 2015, Wayne starred as Mike in the horror film Paranormal Island co-starring Briana Evigan. He also starred as Joel Gilbert in the family-friendly film The Ivy League Farmer. In 2016, Wayne starred as Collin Jenkins in the thriller film Cassidy Way co-starring Christopher Rich. He starred as Thomas J. Ryan in the history drama film Union Bound. He had supporting roles as Graham in the romantic comedy Accidentally Engaged and as Oliver in the thriller The Last Bid. In 2017, he starred as Johnny Taylor in the thriller film Death Pool. That year, he also starred as Jeff in the horror film Escape Room. He also had a supporting role as Scott Schaeffer in the Hallmark Christmas film Enchanted Christmas.

Wayne had a recurring role as Matthew Johnson in season 3 of the web series The Bay. He also had a supporting role as Detective Jake Dark in the film Paint It Red. He starred as Stephen in the short film It Happened Again Last Night alongside Gabrielle Stone. Wayne had a supporting role as Detective Jacobs in the film Cops and Robbers. In 2018, Wayne played the role of David Carter in the direct-to-video horror film Hellraiser: Judgment.

== Filmography ==
=== Film ===
Year	Title	Role	Notes
2005	Scar	Tom	
2006	The Surfer King	Robbie Zirpollo	
2006	Reunion	Jake	
2007	Terror Toons 2	Mark	Direct-to-video
2007	The Fun Park	Justin	Direct-to-video
2008	Grizzly Park	Michael "Scab" White	
2008	Dream Boy	Burke	
2008	The 13th Alley	Matt	
2008	Foreign Exchange	Jay Noble	
2008	The Haunting of Molly Hartley	Michael	
2009	Why Am I Doing This?	Aaron	
2009	The Last Hurrah	Dogbowl	
2009	To Save a Life	Jacob "Jake" Taylor	Nominated - Grace Award for Most Inspiring Movie Acting
2009	Frat Party	Duffy	
2010	Lights Out	Noah	
2010	Vanguard	Lars Seiber	
2010	The Trial	Pete Thomason	
2011	Cougar Hunting	Dick Richards	
2011	Honey 2	Brandon	
2012	Hardflip	Caleb	
2012	Hold Your Breath	Johnny	
2013	Heart of the Country	Luke	
2013	April Apocalypse	Brady	
2013	The Freemason	Cyrus Rothwell	Won - Best Film 2014 Comicon
2014	Android Cop	Andy/Android Cop	
2014	Mantervention	Kip	
2015	Paranormal Island	Mike	
2015	The Ivy League Farmer	Joel Gilbert	
2016	Union Bound	Thomas J. Ryan	
2016	Cassidy Way	Collin Jenkins	
2016	Accidentally Engaged	Graham	
2016	The Last Bid	Oliver	
2017	Death Pool	Johnny Taylor	
2017	Escape Room	Jeff	
2017	Paint It Red	Detective Jake Dark	
2017	It Happened Again Last Night	Stephen	Short film
2017	Cops and Robbers	Detective Jacobs	
2018	Hellraiser: Judgment	Detective David Carter	Direct-to-video
2018	Astro	Young Alexander Biggs	
2018	Paint It Red	Detective Jake Dark	
2018	Christmas Manger	Tyler	
2019	Mope	Ricky Cucumber	
2019	The Legend of 5 Mile Cave	Doc	
2019	Union Bound	Thomas J. Ryan	
2019	Restricted Area	Tucker	
2019	2nd Chance for Christmas	Jason Cleavers	
2019	Hell on the Border	Irish Jack	
2019	Girl Games	Luke	
2020	Clown Fear	Jebediah	
2020	For the Love of Jessee	Dr. Matthews	
2020	The Billionaire	The Doctor	
2020	Out of the Fight	Jason Pate	
2022	Don't Look at the Demon	Wolf	
2023	Only the Good Survive	Mr. Brooks	
2023	The Flood	Bill Elkins	
2023	3 Days in Malay	Simmons	
2023	Sick Girl	Derek	
2024	Model House	Steven James	
2024	Reagan	Tony Dolan	

=== Television ===
Year	Title	Role	Notes
2002	Shipwrecked	Captain Butt Cheeks	Season 3; TV series
2005	Jack & Bobby	Frank	Episode: "Friends with Benefits"
2005	Living with Fran	—	Episode: "Carriage Ride"
2005	The Closer	Corey Horowitz	Episode: "Fantasy Date"
2005	NCIS	Grant Bridges	Episode: "Frame Up"
2006	Huff	Waiter	Episode: "Maps Don't Talk"
2006–2007	Sons & Daughters	Jeff Fenton	Main cast
2007	The Dukes of Hazzard: The Beginning	Luke Duke	Television film
2008	Hot Hot Los Angeles	Victor Papsworth	
2008–2009	My Long Distance Relationship	Cody	
2009	Numbers	Grant	Episode: "Where Credit's Owing"
2009	Ghost Town	Carl	Television film
2011	The Secret Life of the American Teenager	Frank	4 episodes
2011	True Blood	Matt	2 episodes
2011–2012	The Lying Game	Justin Miller	15 episodes
2012	Hot in Cleveland	Mark	Episode: "Love Is Blind"
2017	Enchanted Christmas	Scott Schaeffer	Television film
2017–2020	The Bay	Matthew Johnson	13 episodes; recurring role (seasons 3–4)
2019	A Christmas Movie Christmas	Russell / Chad	Television film
2019	Green Valley	Raymond	Episode: "Pilot"
2021	A Country Romance	Ben	Television film
2021	Deadly Dorm	Dr. Davrow	Television film
2021	My Terrorized Teen	Tom	Television film
2021	Cheer for Your Life	Bill	Television film

=== Web ===
Year	Title	Role	Notes
2011	Talent	Gabe	Series regular, 10 episodes
