= Michael J. Critelli =

American businessman

- Occupations: The MakeUsWell Network, MoveFlux CEO

Michael J. Critelli is the CEO and an investor in The MakeUsWell network of the MoveFlux Corporation. He is the former chairman and CEO (1996-2007) of Pitney Bowes.

== Background ==
Michael grew up in Rochester, New York. He graduated from Bishop Kearney High School in 1966 and the University of Wisconsin with a B.A. in political science and communications in 1970. He graduated from the Harvard Law School with a J.D. cum laude in 1974.

== Pre-CEO career ==
Prior to joining Pitney Bowes as a Counsel in 1979, he was an associate at two Chicago law firms. At Pitney Bowes, he became the company's general counsel in 1988 and added responsibility for its human resources functions in 1990, functions he jointly led until 1993.

As chief HR officer, he created and sustained an employer-sponsored healthcare program, and was featured by Professor Michael Porter in Redefining Healthcare, co-authored with Professor Elizabeth Teisberg, and a 2009 Harvard Business School study. Critelli presented the program at the World Economic Forum in 2007 and 2008.

== Tenure as CEO ==
Critelli became the company's CEO during a period in which the company and the mailing industry underwent transformational change.

Under him, Pitney Bowes was named one of America's most ethical companies.

The Company transitioned its entire installed equipment base from electromechanical and electronic technology to digital, networked systems between 1996 and 2007. It was ranked as one of America's most innovative companies and in the top 200 of patents issued during Critelli's tenure. He was awarded 15 U.S. patents that arose during his tenure at Pitney Bowes.

In 2001, Critelli and Jim Euchner, his leader of Advanced Concepts and Technologies, launched a customer-centered process incorporated into major product development initiatives. Clayton Christensen of the Harvard Business School recognized this as a leading-edge innovation process.

Pitney Bowes exited its office systems and external finance businesses and completed over 80 acquisitions to build strength in software, services and international operations. Through a combination of acquisitions and organic investments, the Company diversified into adjacent "mail stream" market spaces.

Mail volumes, which had continued to grow into the 2000s, finally flattened out later in Critelli's tenure, and dropped precipitously as a result of the drop in consumer credit after the 2008 financial crisis, as noted in a Boston Consulting Group Study

== Industry leadership ==
Between 2001 and 2005, Critelli co-led the Mailing Industry Task Force, along with Deputy Postmaster General John Nolan, to enable the U.S. Postal Service to work with the private sector on a variety of initiatives, and was heavily used as an industry spokesperson during the 2001 anthrax bioterrorism incidents.

He also chaired the Mailing Industry CEO Council, which was an advocate for comprehensive postal reform, an effort resulting in the passage of the Postal Accountability and Enhancement Act of 2006.

== Leadership style ==
Critelli used levers such as compensation structure, skip-level meetings, town hall meetings, talent management and accessibility.

== Community and public service activity ==
Pitney Bowes has been recognized as a leader in diversity and inclusion, leadership development, health promotion and ethical leadership for many decades, starting with the company's most significant leader, Walter H. Wheeler, Jr., continuing under the leadership of Fred T. Allen and George B. Harvey, and built on during Critelli's tenure. Critelli chaired the company's 1993-1994 United Way Campaign, which won the Spirit of America Award.

Critelli chaired two public-private task forces on transportation management, one in 1991-1993 as an appointee of Connecticut Governor Lowell Weicker and one in 2007-2008 as an appointee of Connecticut Governor M. Jodi Rell. He was a participant in the formulation of Connecticut's broad transportation strategy between 1987 and 2008.

Critelli was a board member (1997-2010) and chair of the National Urban League (2002-2007) and a member of the Board of Catalyst, an organization dedicated to expanding opportunities for women at work from 1996 to 2009.

He supported many educational initiatives, including co-leadership of the Connect 96 program between 1995 and 1996 to outfit every Connecticut school and library with Internet service. During his tenure, the Company created an Education and Literacy Foundation to focus Pitney Bowes philanthropy on education, literacy and learning programs.

He was a member of the Connecticut Sustinet Health Board and chaired its Prevention Advisory Committee to review and make recommendations on state healthcare reform legislation and regulations.

== Post-retirement activity ==
From December 2010 to June, 2016, he was the president and CEO of the Dossia Service Corporation, an organization he co-founded, along with Craig Barrett, then the chairman and CEO of Intel Corporation, and senior leaders of eight other Fortune 500 companies. Dossia was a software and technology firm for consumer-driven healthcare.

He currently is the CEO and co-founder of MoveFlux Corporation, a firm that uses augmented intelligence, data and ancillary services to solve significant business problems or create business opportunities for its clients.

Crtielli was a producer of the full-length feature film From the Rough, starring Taraji P. Henson. Screenplay was written by Michael A. Critelli (son). Director and co-producers were Pierre Bagley and Peter Graves. The film was based on the true story of Dr. Catana Starks, the first African-American woman to coach a men's college athletic team. It was released nationwide theatrically in 2014 and is available in ancillary domestic and international markets.

== For-profit board of director and advisory positions ==
He has been a member of the Board of Eaton Corporation, a leading global power management company, since 1998. From 2012 to 2015, he also was a member of the Board of ProHealth Physicians, Inc., the largest primary care physician services organization in New England. The firm was sold to Optum in late 2015

== Non-profit board and advisory positions ==
He is a member of the advisory boards of RAND Health, the TH Chan Harvard School of Public Health, and Wellville, a non-profit focused on getting innovative population health initiatives deployed in five communities.
