= Demi World Tour =

2014–2015 concert tour by Demi Lovato

- World tour by Demi Lovato
- Location: Asia; Europe; North America; Oceania
- Associated album: Demi
- Start date: September 6, 2014
- End date: September 5, 2015
- Legs: 6
- No. of shows: 44
- Supporting acts: Christina Perri; MKTO; Becky G; Andee; Restless Road; Bea Miller; Kiesza; Masketta Fall; Jamie McDell; Laura Mam; Rixton
- Box office: US $35 million

Demi Lovato concert chronology
- The Neon Lights Tour (2014); Demi World Tour (2014–2015); Future Now Tour (2016)

The Demi World Tour was the fourth headlining concert tour and second worldwide tour by American singer Demi Lovato. It was her second tour in support of her fourth studio album Demi (2013), following The Neon Lights Tour. During most of the European tour dates in 2014 (except for Istanbul), Lovato was the opening act for Enrique Iglesias' Sex and Love Tour. The tour was produced and promoted by Live Nation, and sponsored by the Tampax and Always Radiant Collection. The first leg of the tour took place in the United States and Canada from September 6, 2014, to October 27, 2014, when Christina Perri and MKTO were the opening acts. Lovato toured Oceania and Asia in early 2015.

== Background and development ==
On May 28, 2014, a video was published on Lovato's YouTube channel with the text "Tomorrow 10:00 am PST" in a fuchsia color fading in on a white background, followed by a link to her website, while a screaming crowd can be heard in the background. The next day, the Demi World Tour was announced along with the North American dates on Lovato's website, as well as a video on her YouTube channel. Christina Perri and American music duo MKTO were revealed to be serving as opening acts for the North American leg of the tour. Tickets for the tour were made available on June 6, 2014, with the tour set to begin on September 6, 2014. On June 19, 2014, Lovato announced her first-ever date at the Staples Center in Los Angeles. Comparing the show to The Neon Lights Tour, Lovato said, "The Neon Lights Tour was amazing and I had so much fun, but I'm constantly thinking, 'How can I step up my game and how can I take my shows to the next level?' so that's what we're doing with this tour, I'm changing some of the songs, adding new songs, adding new covers. I just want it to be fun and I want it to be everything that I didn't get to do with the Neon Lights Tour."

== Promotion ==
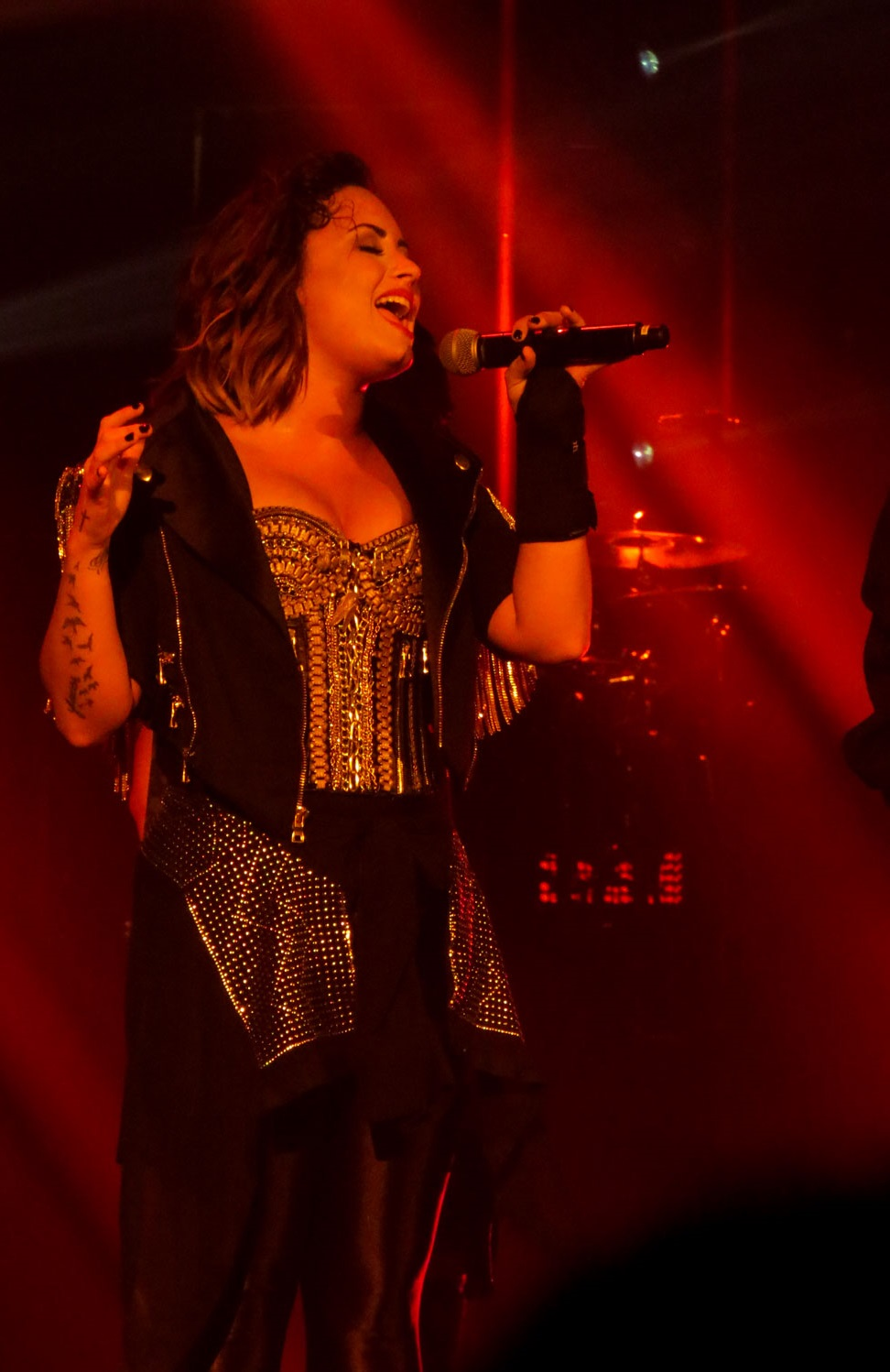
Lovato performing at the Pepsi Center in Denver on September 25, 2014

On April 28, 2014, Lovato announced a partnership with Shazam. The promotion asked European fans to tag the song "Neon Lights" on Shazam, and this information would be used to book her European tour dates. It allowed fans to play a significant part in where her shows would be played. Regarding the partnership, Shazam's head of music said, "This is a fantastic way for Shazam to help Demi Lovato fans across Europe easily cast their vote to have [them] play in a city near them." Lovato made appearances on Late Night with Seth Meyers on June 4, 2014, and Good Morning America as part of their Summer Concert Series on June 6, 2014, to promote the Demi World Tour.

== Set list ==
This set list is from the show on October 25, 2014. It is not intended to represent of all concerts for the duration of the tour.

1. "Really Don't Care"
2. "The Middle"
3. "Fire Starter"
4. "Remember December"
5. "Heart Attack"
6. "My Love is Like a Star"
7. "Don't Forget"
8. "Catch Me"
9. "Let It Go"
10. "Warrior"
11. "Two Pieces"
12. "Thriller" (Michael Jackson cover)
13. "Got Dynamite"
14. "Nightingale"
15. "Skyscraper"
16. "Give Your Heart a Break"

Encore

17. "Neon Lights"

== Tour dates ==
List of 2014 concerts
Date (2014)	City	Country	Venue	Opening act(s)	Attendance	Revenue
September 6	Baltimore	United States	Baltimore Arena	Christina Perri; MKTO	—N/a	—N/a
September 7	Albany	United States	Times Union Center	Christina Perri; MKTO	5,840 / 6,449	$412,441
September 9	Pittsburgh	United States	Petersen Events Center	Christina Perri; MKTO	—N/a	—N/a
September 12	Raleigh	United States	PNC Arena	MKTO	—N/a	—N/a
September 14	Miami	United States	American Airlines Arena	MKTO; Becky G Christina Perri	—N/a	—N/a
September 15	Orlando	United States	Amway Center	MKTO; Becky G Christina Perri	—N/a	—N/a
September 17	New Orleans	United States	Lakefront Arena	MKTO; Becky G Christina Perri	—N/a	—N/a
September 19	San Antonio	United States	AT&T Center	MKTO; Becky G	—N/a	—N/a
September 21	Tulsa	United States	BOK Center	MKTO; Becky G	12,127 / 12,127	$855,178
September 23	Kansas City	United States	Sprint Center	Christina Perri; MKTO; Becky G	—N/a	—N/a
September 25	Denver	United States	Pepsi Center	Christina Perri; MKTO; Becky G	—N/a	—N/a
September 27	Los Angeles	United States	Staples Center	Christina Perri; MKTO; Becky G	14,777 / 14,777	$950,996
September 28	San Diego	United States	Viejas Arena	Christina Perri; MKTO; Becky G	—N/a	—N/a
October 2	Everett	United States	Comcast Arena	Christina Perri; MKTO; Becky G	—N/a	—N/a
October 4	Edmonton	Canada	Rexall Place	Christina Perri; MKTO; Andee	—N/a	—N/a
October 5	Calgary	Canada	Scotiabank Saddledome	Christina Perri; MKTO; Andee	—N/a	—N/a
October 7	Saskatoon	Canada	SaskTel Centre	Christina Perri; MKTO; Andee	—N/a	—N/a
October 10	Sioux Falls	United States	Denny Sanford Premier Center	Christina Perri; Restless Road	5,826 / 6,102	$541,365
October 11	Moline	United States	iWireless Center	Christina Perri; Restless Road	—N/a	—N/a
October 14	Chicago	United States	United Center	Christina Perri; MKTO; Bea Miller	—N/a	—N/a
October 15	Louisville	United States	KFC Yum! Center	Christina Perri; MKTO; Bea Miller	—N/a	—N/a
October 17	Uncasville	United States	Mohegan Sun Arena	Christina Perri; MKTO; Bea Miller	7,048 / 7,048	$727,641
October 19	Montreal	Canada	Bell Centre	Christina Perri; MKTO; Andee	8,881 / 9,382	$444,395
October 20	Hamilton	Canada	FirstOntario Centre	Christina Perri; MKTO; Andee	—N/a	—N/a
October 22	Manchester	United States	Verizon Wireless Arena	Christina Perri; MKTO; Bea Miller	4,807 / 5,000	$232,535
October 24	Hershey	United States	Giant Center	Christina Perri; MKTO; Bea Miller	—N/a	—N/a
October 25	Newark	United States	Prudential Center	Christina Perri; MKTO; Kiesza	—N/a	—N/a
October 27	New York City	United States	Barclays Center	Christina Perri; MKTO; Kiesza	12,482 / 12,482	$799,013
November 16	Istanbul	Turkey	Ülker Sports Arena	—N/a	—N/a	—N/a

List of 2015 concerts
Date (2015)	City	Country	Venue	Opening act(s)	Attendance	Revenue
April 17	Brisbane	Australia	BCEC Great Hall	Masketta Fall	—N/a	—N/a
April 18	Sydney	Australia	Hordern Pavilion	Masketta Fall	—N/a	—N/a
April 21	Perth	Australia	Crown Theatre	Masketta Fall	—N/a	—N/a
April 24	Melbourne	Australia	Margaret Court Arena	Masketta Fall	—N/a	—N/a
April 26	Auckland	New Zealand	Vector Arena	Jamie McDell	—N/a	—N/a
April 28	Singapore		Suntec Auditorium	—N/a	—N/a	—N/a
April 30	Pasay	Philippines	Mall of Asia Arena	—N/a	—N/a	—N/a
May 2 (Note: The May 2, 2015, concert in Zhenjiang, China, was part of the Chang Jiang International Music Festival.)	Zhenjiang	China	Shiyezhou Island	—N/a	—N/a	—N/a
May 4	Kuala Lumpur	Malaysia	KL Live at Life Centre	—N/a	—N/a	—N/a
May 5	Phnom Penh	Cambodia	Koh Pich	Laura Mam	—N/a	—N/a
May 9 (Note: The May 9, 2015, concert in Ho Chi Minh City, Vietnam, was part of YAN Beatfest.)	Ho Chi Minh City	Vietnam	Phú Thọ Horse Racing Ground	—N/a	—N/a	—N/a
May 24 (Note: The May 24, 2015, concert in Jakarta, Indonesia, was part of the 2nd Indonesian Choice Awards. Lovato's setlist included "Let It Go", "Heart Attack" and "Give Your Heart a Break".)	Jakarta	Indonesia	Indonesia Convention Exhibition	—N/a	—N/a	—N/a
June 6 (Note: The June 6, 2015, concert in New York City was part of DigiFest. Lovato's setlist included "Really Don't Care", "Skyscraper" and "Neon Lights".)	New York City	United States	Citi Field	—N/a	—N/a	—N/a
July 11 (Note: The July 11, 2015, concert in Cincinnati, Ohio, was part of the MLB All-Star Game Concert. Lovato's setlist included "Cool for the Summer" and "Made in the USA".)	Cincinnati	United States	Paul Brown Stadium	Rixton	—N/a	—N/a
September 5 (Note: The September 5, 2015, concert in Saint-Quentin, France, was part of the NRJ Music Tour. Lovato's setlist included "Cool for the Summer".)	Saint-Quentin	France	Place de la Liberté	—N/a	—N/a	—N/a
Total					71,788 / 73,367 (98%)	$4,963,564

== Cancelled show ==
Date	City	Country	Venue	Reason
October 16, 2015 (Note: The October 16, 2015, concert in Madrid, Spain was part of the Coca-Cola Music Experience. However, Lovato announced on September 11, 2015, that the concert was cancelled. Subsequently, they were replaced by Iggy Azalea.)	Madrid	Spain	Barclaycard Center	Scheduling conflict
