= Really Don't Care =

2014 single by Demi Lovato

Single by Demi Lovato featuring Cher Lloyd

from the album Demi
- Released: May 20, 2014
- Studio: Kinglet Studios (Stockholm, Sweden); Chalice Studios (Los Angeles, California)
- Genre: Dance-pop
- Length: 3:21
- Label: Hollywood
- Songwriters: Demi Lovato; Carl Falk; Savan Kotecha; Rami Yacoub; Cher Lloyd
- Producers: Carl Falk; Rami Yacoub

Demi Lovato singles chronology
"Somebody to You" (2014)	"Really Don't Care" (2014)	"Up" (2014)

Cher Lloyd singles chronology
"Sirens" (2014)	"Really Don't Care" (2014)	"4U" (2018)

Music video
- "Really Don't Care" on YouTube

"Really Don't Care" is a song by American singer Demi Lovato, featuring English singer Cher Lloyd. The song was released on May 20, 2014, as the fourth and final single from the former's fourth studio album Demi (2013). Both of them co-wrote the track with Savan Kotecha and its producers Carl Falk and Rami Yacoub. "Really Don't Care" has been certified 2× platinum by Recording Industry Association of America (RIAA). It is Lovato's third number one on the US Dance chart. The track reached the top 10 in Israel as well as the top 30 in Canada, Slovakia, and the United States.

== Composition ==
"Really Don't Care" is an uptempo dance-pop song, with influences of bubblegum pop, that runs for three minutes and twenty-one seconds. Lloyd makes a brief appearance during the bridge. Lyrically, the song is a message of defiance to a former lover, with Lovato confidently singing such lines as, "Even if the stars and moon collide, I never want you back into my life."

The song is set in the key of G major and maintains a moderately fast tempo of 121 beats per minute in common time. Lovato originally wrote the song as a breakup song. She later chose to make it a more empowering song, and told Refinery29 "I wanted to make it more empowering, when I thought of the lyrics 'really don't care', it made me think of bullying, and made me think of the LGBT community, who deal with that so often, but they accept themselves."

== Critical reception ==
Billboard writer Jason Lipshutz praised Lovato's "sassy" confidence on the track, which effectively showcases her "overpowering pipes". He also commented positively on the placement of the song on the track list, noting that "Really Don't Care" serves a "buoyant reprieve" after more emotionally heavy tracks. Sam Lansky of Idolator described the song as "irresistibly spunky", but found Lloyd's short feature to be superfluous. 4Music called the song "a brilliant break-up survival anthem that sticks it to every annoying ex ever". On the other hand, Melinda Newman of HitFix found the song to be too generic, comparing it to Icona Pop's track "I Love It" (2012).

== Commercial performance ==
Before it was released as a single, "Really Don't Care" debuted on the Billboard Hot 100 at number 98. After it was released as a single, it peaked at number 26 making it Lovato's eighth top 40 entry on the Hot 100 and making Cher Lloyd's third entry on that chart and second top 40 single since her song "Want U Back". On the US Dance Chart, it became Lovato's third number one and Lloyd's first number one on that chart. As of October 2017, "Really Don't Care" has sold over 952,000 digital downloads in the United States.

== Music videos ==
=== Background and synopsis ===
The official music video was released on June 26, 2014, although few teasers for the video were previously uploaded on Lovato's official YouTube channel. The video starts off with Lovato expressing her support for the LGBT community and saying "my Jesus loves all." After that, the music starts and Lovato is seen singing her single at the parade. The video was filmed on June 8, 2014, at the LA Pride Parade and features cameo appearances from Perez Hilton, Kat Graham, Shane Bitney Crone, Bria Kam and Chrissy Chambers, John Taylor, Travis Barker and Wilmer Valderrama. Cher Lloyd also appears during the bridge part of the song. It was directed by Ryan Pallotta, who collaborated with Lovato from her previous music videos, "Neon Lights" and "Made in the USA".

=== Lyric video ===
The lyric video was uploaded on May 14, 2014, on Lovato's Vevo account. The video features the lyrics of the song above several shots of Brazilian fans lip syncing the song as well as some scenes from concerts where Lovato performs the song during the concert tour. During the video, Lovato makes an appearance to surprise some of the fans. At the end, a message is displayed to thank the Brazilian fans for helping out with the filming of the lyric video.

== Live performances ==
Lovato performed the song on several occasions before its official release as a single. Once released in May 2014, performances include on the Season 13 Live Final of American Idol, Good Morning America Summer Concert Series, Late Night with Seth Meyers, and the 2014 Teen Choice Awards. The song was also included in the setlists for The Neon Lights Tour and the Demi World Tour. Furthermore, the song was part of Lovato's setlist at the 2015 iHeartRadio Music Festival on September 18–19, 2015.

== Awards and nominations ==
Year	Award	Category	Work	Result
2014	Young Hollywood Awards	"Song of the Summer/DJ Replay"	"Really Don't Care"	Nominated
2014	MTV Video Music Awards	"Best Lyric Video"	"Really Don't Care"	Nominated
2014	Teen Choice Awards	Choice Summer Song	"Really Don't Care"	Won
2014	Teen Choice Awards	Choice Break-Up Song	"Really Don't Care"	Nominated
2015	Radio Disney Music Awards	Best Breakup Song	"Really Don't Care"	Nominated
2015	Radio Disney Music Awards	Best Collaboration	"Really Don't Care"	Won

== Formats and track listings ==
- Digital download (Remixes EP)
1. "Really Don't Care" (feat. Cher Lloyd) (Radio Disney version) - 3:20
2. "Really Don't Care" (DJLW Remix) - 4:30
3. "Really Don't Care" (Toy Armada & DJ GRIND Remix) - 5:35
4. "Really Don't Care" (Cole Plante Remix) - 5:07
5. "Really Don't Care" (Digital Dog Club Remix) - 5:07
- Digital download (Remixes)
1. "Really Don't Care" (Cole Plante Remix) - 5:07
2. "Really Don't Care" (Cole Plante Radio Remix) - 3:37
- Digital download (EP)
1. "Really Don't Care" (feat. Cher Lloyd) - 3:21
2. "Really Don't Care" (DJLW Radio Edit) - 3:14
3. "Really Don't Care" (Cole Plante Radio Remix) - 3:37
4. "Really Don't Care" (Digital Dog Radio Remix) - 3:19
5. "Really Don't Care" (Toy Armada & DJ GRIND Radio Remix) - 3:40
6. "Demi in London" (Video) - 2:22
- Digital and download
1. "Really Don't Care" (feat. Cher Lloyd) - 3:21

== Charts ==
=== Weekly charts ===
Chart (2014)	Peak position
Australia (ARIA)	81
Belgium (Ultratip Bubbling Under Flanders)	13
Belgium (Ultratip Bubbling Under Wallonia)	14
Brazil (Billboard Hot 100 Airplay)	56
Canada Hot 100 (Billboard)	24
Canada CHR/Top 40 (Billboard)	15
Canada Hot AC (Billboard)	27
Czech Republic Airplay (ČNS IFPI)	43
Czech Republic Singles Digital (ČNS IFPI)	36
Ireland (IRMA)	82
Israel (Media Forest)	8
New Zealand (Recorded Music NZ)	36
Scotland (Official Charts Company)	50
Slovakia Singles Digital (ČNS IFPI)	22
UK Singles (Official Charts)	92
US Billboard Hot 100	26
US Adult Pop Airplay (Billboard)	25
US Dance Airplay (Billboard)	18
US Dance Club Songs (Billboard)	1
US Pop Airplay (Billboard)	7

=== Year-end charts ===
Chart (2014)	Peak position
Canada (Canadian Hot 100)	99
US Pop Songs (Billboard)	44
US Dance Club Songs (Billboard)	6

== Certifications ==
Region	Certification	Certified units/sales
Australia (ARIA)	Platinum	70,000^{‡}
Brazil (Pro-Música Brasil)	Platinum	60,000^{‡}
Denmark (IFPI Danmark)	Gold	45,000^{‡}
New Zealand (RMNZ)	Platinum	30,000^{‡}
Norway (IFPI Norway)	Platinum	60,000^{‡}
Sweden (GLF)	Gold	20,000^{‡}
United Kingdom (BPI)	Silver	200,000^{‡}
United States (RIAA)	2× Platinum	2,000,000^{‡}
^{‡} Sales+streaming figures based on certification alone.

== See also ==
- List of number-one dance singles of 2014 (U.S.)
