= Without the Love =

Without the Love may refer to:

- "Without the Love", song by China Crisis from Warped by Success 1994
- "Without the Love", song by Demi Lovato from Demi 2013
