= Teen Choice Award for Choice Music – Summer Song =

Entertainment award category

The following is a list of Teen Choice Award winners and nominees for Choice Music - Summer Song. Jonas Brothers, Miley Cyrus, Demi Lovato, and Fifth Harmony receives the most wins with 2.

== Winners and nominees ==
=== 1999 ===
Year	Winner	Nominees	Ref.
1999	"If You Had My Love" – Jennifer Lopez	"All Star" – Smash Mouth; "Beautiful Stranger" – Madonna; "Genie in a Bottle" – Christina Aguilera; "Hate Me Now" – Nas feat. Puff Daddy; "I Want It That Way" – Backstreet Boys; "Livin' la Vida Loca" – Ricky Martin; "Wild Wild West" – Will Smith	

=== 2000s ===
Year	Winner	Nominees	Ref.
2000	"It's Gonna Be Me" – *NSYNC	"Be with You" – Enrique Iglesias; "I Turn to You" – Christina Aguilera; "Incomplete" – Sisqó; "Oops!...I Did It Again" – Britney Spears; "The Real Slim Shady" – Eminem; "There You Go" – Pink; "Try Again" – Aaliyah	
2001	"Lady Marmalade" – Christina Aguilera, Lil' Kim, Mýa, and Pink	"Angel" – Shaggy feat. Rayvon; "Bootylicious" – Destiny's Child; "Irresistible" – Jessica Simpson; "Let Me Blow Ya Mind" – Eve & Gwen Stefani; "Pop" – *NSYNC; "Ride wit Me" – Nelly feat. City Spud; "U Remind Me" – Usher	
2002	"Hot in Herre" – Nelly	"All You Wanted" – Michelle Branch; "Foolish" – Ashanti; "Gangsta Lovin'" – Eve feat. Alicia Keys; "Hero" – Chad Kroeger feat. Josey Scott; "The Middle" – Jimmy Eat World; "Soak Up the Sun" – Sheryl Crow; "A Thousand Miles" – Vanessa Carlton	
2003	"Crazy in Love" – Beyoncé feat. Jay Z	"21 Questions" – 50 Cent feat. Nate Dogg; "Bring Me to Life" – Evanescence; "Get Busy" – Sean Paul; "Right Thurr" – Chingy; "Rock wit U (Awww Baby)" – Ashanti; "Shake Ya Tailfeather" – Nelly, Diddy, & Murphy Lee; "Where Is the Love?" – The Black Eyed Peas	
2004	"Pieces of Me" – Ashlee Simpson	"Burn" – Usher; "Dip It Low" – Christina Milian; "If I Ain't Got You" – Alicia Keys; "The Reason" – Hoobastank; "Slow Motion" – Juvenile feat. Soulja Slim; "Turn Me On" – Kevin Lyttle; "Welcome Back" – Mase	
2005	"Behind These Hazel Eyes" – Kelly Clarkson	"Don't Phunk with My Heart" – The Black Eyed Peas; "Get It Poppin'" – Fat Joe feat. Nelly; "Hollaback Girl" – Gwen Stefani; "Just a Lil Bit" – 50 Cent; "Lose Control" – Missy Elliott feat. Ciara and Fatman Scoop; "Oh" – Ciara feat. Ludacris; "Pon De Replay" – Rihanna; "These Boots Are Made For Walkin'" – Jessica Simpson; "Untitled (How Could This Happen to Me?)" – Simple Plan; "We Belong Together" – Mariah Carey	
2006	"Promiscuous" – Nelly Furtado feat. Timbaland	"Ain't No Other Man" – Christina Aguilera; "Crazy" – Gnarls Barkley; "Hips Don't Lie" – Shakira feat. Wyclef Jean; "Ridin'" – Chamillionaire feat. Krayzie Bone; "Unfaithful" – Rihanna	
2007	"Hey There Delilah" – Plain White T's	"Beautiful Girls" – Sean Kingston; "Lip Gloss" – Lil Mama; "Party Like a Rockstar" – Shop Boyz; "Shut Up and Drive" – Rihanna	
2008	"Burnin' Up" – Jonas Brothers	"7 Things" – Miley Cyrus; "Forever" – Chris Brown; "I Kissed a Girl" – Katy Perry; "Leavin'" – Jesse McCartney	
2009	"Before the Storm" – Jonas Brothers feat. Miley Cyrus	"Fire Burning" – Sean Kingston; "I Gotta Feeling" – The Black Eyed Peas; "I Know You Want Me (Calle Ocho)" – Pitbull; "Knock You Down" – Keri Hilson feat. Kanye West & Ne-Yo	

=== 2010s ===
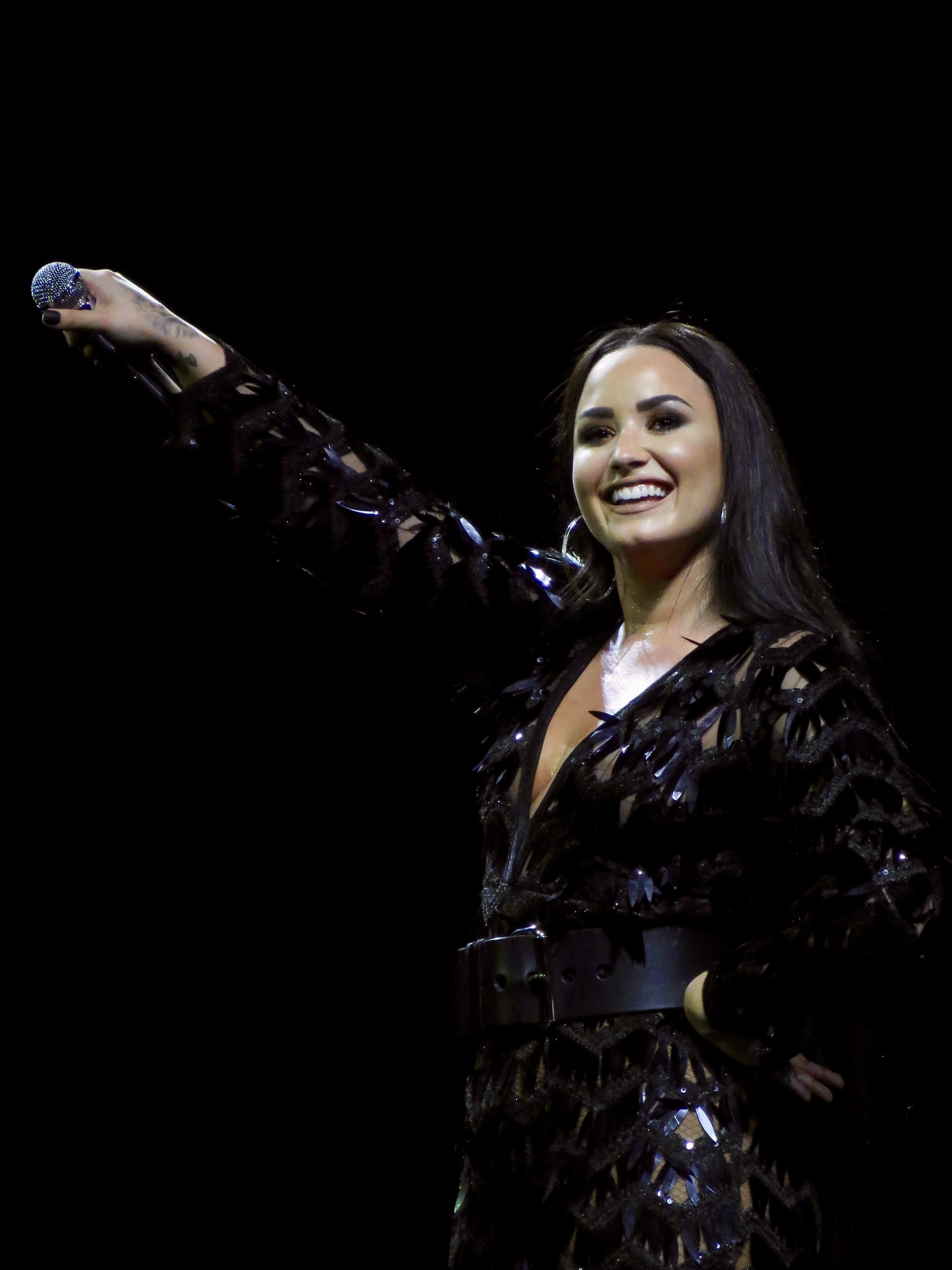
Two-time winner Demi Lovato

Year	Winner	Nominees	Ref.
2010	"California Gurls" – Katy Perry feat. Snoop Dogg	"Airplanes" – B.o.B feat. Hayley Williams; "Alejandro" – Lady Gaga; "Billionaire" – Travie McCoy feat. Bruno Mars; "Your Love Is My Drug" – Kesha	
2011	"Skyscraper" – Demi Lovato	"Last Friday Night" – Katy Perry; "The Lazy Song" – Bruno Mars; "Party Rock Anthem" – LMFAO ft. Lauren Bennett and GoonRock; "Super Bass" – Nicki Minaj	
2012	"Call Me Maybe" – Carly Rae Jepsen	"All Around the World" – Justin Bieber feat. Ludacris; "Give Your Heart a Break" – Demi Lovato; "Glad You Came" – The Wanted; "Scream" – Usher	
2013	"We Can't Stop" – Miley Cyrus	"Blurred Lines" – Robin Thicke feat. Pharrell Williams & T.I.; "Cruise (REMIX)" – Florida Georgia Line feat. Nelly; "Get Lucky" – Daft Punk feat. Pharrell Williams; "Treasure" – Bruno Mars	
2014	"Really Don't Care" – Demi Lovato ft. Cher Lloyd	"Fancy" – Iggy Azalea ft. Charli XCX; "Rude" – Magic!; "Summer" – Calvin Harris; "Wiggle" – Jason Derulo ft. Snoop Dogg	
2015	"Worth It" – Fifth Harmony feat. Kid Ink	"Bad Blood" – Taylor Swift feat. Kendrick Lamar; "Cheerleader" – OMI; "Cool for the Summer" – Demi Lovato; "Fight Song" – Rachel Platten; "Good for You" – Selena Gomez feat. ASAP Rocky	
2016	"Work from Home" – Fifth Harmony feat. Ty Dolla $ign	"7 Years" – Lukas Graham; "Cake by the Ocean" – DNCE; "Can't Stop the Feeling!" – Justin Timberlake; "Like I Would" – Zayn; "This Is What You Came For" – Calvin Harris feat. Rihanna	
2017	"Despacito" – Luis Fonsi & Daddy Yankee feat. Justin Bieber	"Bad Liar" – Selena Gomez; "Castle on the Hill" – Ed Sheeran; "Malibu" – Miley Cyrus; "Stay" – Zedd & Alessia Cara; "That's What I Like" – Bruno Mars	
2018	"Back to You" – Selena Gomez	"Familiar" – Liam Payne & J Balvin; "Girls Like You" – Maroon 5 feat. Cardi B; "Nice for What" – Drake; "One Kiss" – Calvin Harris & Dua Lipa; "Youngblood" – 5 Seconds of Summer	
2019	"Señorita" – Shawn Mendes and Camila Cabello	"Cool" - Jonas Brothers; "Easier" - 5 Seconds of Summer; "Summer Days" - Martin Garrix ft. Macklemore and Patrick Stump; "Truth Hurts" - Lizzo; "You Need to Calm Down" - Taylor Swift	
