= A Special Night with Demi Lovato =

2011–13 concert tour by Demi Lovato

- World tour by Demi Lovato
- Location: Asia; Europe; North America; South America
- Associated album: Unbroken
- Start date: November 16, 2011
- End date: March 27, 2013
- No. of shows: 68
- Box office: $47.700.000

Demi Lovato concert chronology
- Demi Lovato: Live in Concert (2009–2010); A Special Night with Demi Lovato (2011–2013); The Neon Lights Tour (2014)

A Special Night with Demi Lovato was the second headlining concert tour and first world tour by American singer Demi Lovato, in support of her third studio album Unbroken (2011).

== Background ==
Launched in November 2011, the first leg consisted of 19 shows made up of both headlining concerts and winter festivals. As it ventured into 2012, the trek mostly consisted of appearances at radio festivals and state fairs during February and March. In April 2012 Lovato embarked on a South American leg, playing a total of 10 shows. The second leg in North America, and the third leg in total became known as the Summer Tour 2012, consisting of 25 shows across North and South America. In 2013, the tour was expanded to promote "Heart Attack" which is the lead single of her fourth studio album, Demi. The tour played over 70 shows in the Americas, Asia and Europe. The concert tour has been praised by music critics for Lovato's performances and vocals. The concert was nominated for a Billboard Touring award and won a Capricho Award for Best Concert.

== Broadcast and recordings ==
Lovato's journey through the first US leg of the tour was documented as a part of her television documentary Demi Lovato: Stay Strong which aired on MTV in 2012. The film followed Lovato through the tour, showing exclusive behind the scenes moments and highlighting Demi's journey through her recovery on her first tour since leaving rehab earlier in 2011.

== Opening acts ==
- Hot Chelle Rae (North America–2012, select dates)
- Owl City (North America–2012, select dates)
- Neon Hitch (Los Angeles, Camden)
- We the Kings (North America—2012, select dates)
- College 11 (São Paulo and Rio de Janeiro)
- Danna Paola (Mexico City and Monterrey)
- Khalil Ramos (Manila)

== Setlist ==
November 16, 2011 – Detroit, Michigan – Fox Theatre
1. "All Night Long"
2. "Got Dynamite"
3. "Hold Up"
4. Medley: "Catch Me" / "Don't Forget"
5. "Who's That Boy"
6. "My Love is Like a Star"
7. "Fix a Heart"
8. Medley: "Get Back" / "Here We Go Again" / "La La Land"
9. "Lightweight"
10. "Skyscraper"
11. "Moves Like Jagger / Workin' Day and Night" (Maroon 5 / Michael Jackson cover)
12. "Together"

Encore

13. "Unbroken"
14. "Remember December"
April 19, 2012 – Rio de Janeiro, Brazil – Citibank Hall
1. "All Night Long"
2. "Got Dynamite"
3. "Hold Up"
4. Medley: "Get Back" / "Catch Me" / "Don't Forget"
5. "My Love is Like a Star"
6. "Fix a Heart"
7. "Who's That Boy"
8. "You're My Only Shorty"
9. Medley: "Here We Go Again" / "La La Land"
10. "Lightweight"
11. "Skyscraper"
12. "How to Love" (Lil Wayne cover)
13. "Together"

Encore

14. "Remember December"
15. "Give Your Heart a Break"
16. "Unbroken"
March 18, 2013 – Singapore – The Coliseum
1. "Unbroken"
2. "Get Back"
3. Medley: "Here We Go Again" / "La La Land" / "Don't Forget"
4. "My Love is Like a Star"
5. "Fix a Heart"
6. "Catch Me"
7. "Lightweight"
8. "Skyscraper"
9. "Got Dynamite"
10. "Turn Up the Music" (Chris Brown cover)
11. "Heart Attack"
12. "Remember December"

Encore

13. "Give Your Heart a Break"

== Tour dates ==
List of 2011 concerts
Date (2011)	City	Country	Venue	Attendance	Revenue
November 16	Detroit	United States	Fox Theatre	3,841 / 3,841	$231,210
November 18	Mashantucket	United States	MGM Grand Theater	3,565 / 3,565	$252,418
November 19	Hershey	United States	Hershey Theatre	2,831 / 2,831	$187,135
November 22	Kansas City	United States	Midland Theatre	2,039 / 2,624	$150,731
November 25	Houston	United States	Verizon Wireless Theater	—N/a	—N/a
November 26	Grand Prairie	United States	Verizon Theatre at Grand Prairie	3,275 / 3,275	$225,122
November 27	New Orleans	United States	Mahalia Jackson Theater	1,981 / 2,127	$176,820
November 29	St. Louis	United States	Peabody Opera House	2,599 / 2,599	$154,127
December 1	Atlanta	United States	John A. Williams Theatre	2,773 / 2,817	$183,128
December 3	Rosemont	United States	Rosemont Theatre	4,274 / 4,274	$370,618
December 16	San Juan	Puerto Rico	Coliseo de Puerto Rico	—N/a	—N/a

List of 2012 concerts
Date (2012)	City	Country	Venue	Attendance	Revenue
February 4^{[E]}	Iquique	Chile	Estadio Tierra de Campeones	—N/a	—N/a
March 2^{[F]}	Plant City	United States	Wish Farms Soundstage	—N/a	—N/a
March 4^{[G]}	Hidalgo	United States	State Farm Arena	—N/a	—N/a
March 13^{[H]}	Austin	United States	Luedecke Arena	—N/a	—N/a
April 13	Panama City	Panama	Figali Convention Center	—N/a	—N/a
April 15	Caracas	Venezuela	Espacios Abiertos de la UNIMET	11,817 / 12,200	$708,792
April 17	Lima	Peru	Jockey Club Parcela H	13,932 / 14,000	$841,300
April 19	Rio de Janeiro	Brazil	Citibank Hall	7,571 / 7,687	$498,296
April 20	São Paulo	Brazil	Citibank Hall	13,224 / 13,224 (Note: The score data is combined from the shows held at the Citibank Hall on April 20 and 30, respectively.)	$1,216,672
April 22	Belo Horizonte	Brazil	Chevrolet Hall	4,353 / 4,353	$386,387
April 24	Santiago	Chile	Movistar Arena	11,750 / 11,750	$520,934
April 26	Asunción	Paraguay	Banco Central del Paraguay	2,000 / 2,000	$127,247
April 28	Buenos Aires	Argentina	Microestadio Malvinas Argentinas	12,857 / 12,857	$619,327
April 29	Montevideo	Uruguay	Velódromo Municipal de Montevideo	—N/a	—N/a
April 30	São Paulo	Brazil	Citibank Hall	—	—
May 2	Mexico City	Mexico	Auditorio Nacional	8,983 / 9,520	$544,042
May 3	Monterrey	Mexico	Arena Monterrey	10,341 / 10,341	$761,533
June 12^{[I]}	Del Mar	United States	Heineken Grandstand Stage	—N/a	—N/a
June 22	Holmdel	United States	PNC Bank Arts Center	14,349 / 14,349	$615,467
June 23	Hershey	United States	Star Pavilion	—N/a	—N/a
June 24	Wolf Trap	United States	Filene Center	9,264 / 9,264	$376,994
June 26	Saratoga Springs	United States	Saratoga Performing Arts Center	—N/a	—N/a
June 30	Uncasville	United States	Mohegan Sun Arena	5,132 / 5,382	$324,554
July 1	Hopewell	United States	Marvin Sands Performing Arts Center	—N/a	—N/a
July 3	Toronto	Canada	Molson Canadian Amphitheatre	8,027 / 8,958	$607,880
July 5	Boston	United States	Bank of America Pavilion	7,411 / 7,411	$357,613
July 12	Salt Lake City	United States	EnergySolutions Arena	—N/a	—N/a
July 13	Phoenix	United States	Comerica Theatre	2,588 / 2,588	$219,883
July 14	Las Vegas	United States	House of Blues	—N/a	—N/a
July 15	Bakersfield	United States	Rabobank Arena	—N/a	—N/a
July 17	San Jose	United States	Event Center Arena	4,405 / 4,405	$355,557
July 18	Los Angeles	United States	Greek Theatre	5,390 / 5,839	$384,152
July 20^{[J]}	Sacramento	United States	Sleep Train Arena	—N/a	—N/a
August 4^{[K]}	Highland Park	United States	Ravinia Pavilion	—N/a	—N/a
August 11^{[L]}	Springfield	United States	Illinois State Fair Grandstand	—N/a	—N/a
August 12	Camden	United States	BB&T Pavilion	15,610 / 15,610	$833,491
August 27^{[M]}	Essex Junction	United States	Xfinity Stage	—N/a	—N/a
August 28^{[N]}	Falcon Heights	United States	Minnesota State Fair Grandstand	—N/a	—N/a
August 30^{[O]}	Monroe	United States	Evergreen State Fair Grandstand	—N/a	—N/a
September 1^{[P]}	Salem	United States	L.B. Day Comcast Amphitheatre	—N/a	—N/a
September 29^{[Q]}	São Paulo	Brazil	Arena Anhembi	16,500 / 16,500 (Note: The score data of the shows on 29 September and 30 September are part of the "Z Festival".)	$1,344,620
September 30^{[Q]}	Rio de Janeiro	Brazil	HSBC Arena	7,500 / 7,500	$625,108

List of 2013 concerts
Date	City	Country	Venue	Attendance	Revenue
March 2^{[R]}	Orlando	United States	Universal Music Plaza Stage	—N/a	—N/a
March 3^{[S]}	Houston	United States	Reliant Stadium	—N/a	—N/a
March 18	Sentosa	Singapore	Resorts World Sentosa	5,399 / 5,399	$673,912
March 20	Quezon City	Philippines	Smart Araneta Coliseum	11,677 / 11,677	$841,682
March 22^{[T]}	Kuala Lumpur	Malaysia	KLCC Outdoor Plaza	—N/a	—N/a
March 24	Jakarta	Indonesia	Istora Senayan	—N/a	—N/a
March 27	Moscow	Russia	Crocus City Hall	8,770 / 8,770	$433,237
Total				246,028 / 249,537 (99%)	$16,149,989

Festivals and other miscellaneous performances

^{A} This concert was a part of the "107.5 The River Acoustic Christmas"
^{B} This concert was a part of "Now 100.5 Santa Slam"
^{C} This concert was a part of the "Kissmas Bash 2K11"
^{D} These concerts were a part of "Jingle Ball"
^{E} This concert is a part of "Festival Verano Iquique"
^{F} This concert was a part of the "Florida Strawberry Festival"
^{G} This concert was a part of the "Borderfest"
^{H} This concert was a part of the "Star of Texas Fair and Rodeo"
^{I} This concert was a part of the "Toyota Summer Concert Series"
^{J} This concert was a part of "Endfest"

^{K} This concert was a part of the "Ravinia Festival"
^{L} This concert was a part of the "Illinois State Fair"
^{M} This concert was a part of the "Budweiser Concert Series"
^{N} This concert was a part of the "Minnesota State Fair"
^{O} This concert was a part of the "Evergreen State Fair"
^{P} This concert was a part of the "Oregon State Fair"
^{Q} These concerts were a part of the "Z Festival"
^{R} This concert was a part of the "Universal Orlando Mardi Gras"
^{S} This concert was a part of the "Houston Livestock Show and Rodeo"
^{T} This concert was a part of "Twin Towers Live"

Cancellations and rescheduled shows

July 14, 2012	Las Vegas, Nevada	PH Live	Moved to the House of Blues
