= Neon Lights (Demi Lovato song) =

2013 single by Demi Lovato

Single by Demi Lovato

from the album Demi
- Released: November 19, 2013
- Studio: Patriot Studios (Denver, Colorado); Eargasm Studios (Santa Monica, Calfironia)
- Genre: Dance; electropop
- Length: 3:53 (album version); 3:38 (radio edit)
- Label: Hollywood
- Songwriters: Demi Lovato; Mario Marchetti; Tiffany Vartanyan; Ryan Tedder; Noel Zancanella
- Producers: Ryan Tedder; Noel Zancanella

Demi Lovato singles chronology
"Let It Go" (2013)	"Neon Lights" (2013)	"Somebody to You" (2014)

Music video
- "Neon Lights" on YouTube

"Neon Lights" is a song by American singer Demi Lovato from her fourth studio album, Demi (2013). The song was released as the album's third single on November 19, 2013 by Hollywood Records. Ryan Tedder and Noel Zancanella produced and co-wrote the song along with Lovato, Mario Marchetti and Tiffany Vartanyan. On September 29, 2013, Lovato announced the name of her concert tour, the Neon Lights Tour, and soon after that "Neon Lights" would become the third single from the album. The song, with its prominent EDM and four-on-the-floor influences, covered new ground for Lovato, who had been previously known for her pop rock and ballad singles. Its accompanying music video was released on November 21, 2013.

The single reached number one on the Israeli TV Airplay chart. In New Zealand, the song peaked at number 12 and was certified gold. It reached number 36 on the Hot 100, peaking at this position for three non-consecutive weeks. The song reached number 2 on the Ukraine Dance Charts. It topped the US Hot Dance Club Songs chart and became Lovato's third top 10 single at Mainstream Top 40, reaching number 7. The song has since been certified double platinum in the US.

An accompanying music video for "Neon Lights" was directed by Ryan Pallotta, and was premiered through Vevo on November 21, 2013. Lovato has performed the track on several television programs, and has also included the song on the set list of her Neon Lights Tour (2014). A re-recorded rock version with American rock band The Maine was included on her first remix album Revamped.

== Production and composition ==
"Neon Lights" is a dance and electropop song with EDM, dance-pop and four-on-the-floor influences. In October 2013, Tedder explained his idea to produce the dance record, stating, "That record, Neon Lights, we did intentionally because I wanted to. I heard it on [a friend's] demo-reel and the next day I woke up and the melody was in my head, and I couldn't get it out of my head for two days, that's when I knew." Tedder also went on to compliment Lovato's vocals, stating, "She came in and just ripped it. She in pop music has one of the biggest ranges, possibly the highest full voice singer I've ever worked with. She can belt full voice like three octaves above middle C, it's just crazy, and with complete power and complete control. At the beginning she's singing the lowest note she's ever done and by the end she's going as high as she's ever gone." Tedder says the song was a "fun dance record." According to Musicnotes.com, Lovato's vocal range spans from the low note of C♯_{3} to the high note of D_{5}. The song moves at a tempo of 120 beats per minute in the key of F♯ minor.

== Release ==
Lovato announced that the song would be the third single from Demi on September 27, 2013, by posting a short teaser video to her Facebook page featuring the words "Neon Lights" formed out of neon light tubes, with the background music being "Neon Lights". The words "SUNDAY 6 PM EST" appeared on screen just before it ended, suggesting the release of the music video or the new single. However, this was actually a reference to a live Facebook chat Lovato had with her fans on September 29, where she confirmed "Neon Lights" as the next single of Demi and also announced her associated tour of the same name in support of the album. Despite the announcement in September, the official release of the single was on November 19, with the music video being released two days later on November 21.

== Critical reception ==
Jason Lipshutz of Billboard called "Neon Lights" a "misguided dance stunt". He explained that the song "covers well-worn electro-pop territory" and does so very effectively. He also states that the song is well done for "the blinking synthesizers and clomping bass that receive a boost from the singer's unflappable power." Sam Lansky of Idolator also described "Neon Lights" as out of place, and called it a "by-the-numbers..... concession to pop-EDM trend-following" that succeeded to dazzle.

== Music video ==
The music video was released on November 21, 2013. The video was directed by Ryan Pallotta, who previously worked with Lovato, who co-directed for the music video, "Made in the USA". The video begins as Lovato emerging from a pool of water. In the next scene, she performs the introduction of the song in a room wired with neon lights and another scene where Lovato is later shown dancing and singing with the backup dancers in a club. During the video, the singer is wearing neon makeup and neon rain starts falling down. The scenes are shown repeatedly throughout the video. Lovato is also shown swimming nude.

== Live performances ==
Lovato first performed the song at We Day on September 20, 2013. She then promoted it on October 3, 2013, at The Tonight Show with Jay Leno with a performance, the first on television. On October 7, 2013, Lovato performed the song during her interview on The Ellen DeGeneres Show. Lovato performed the song during the results show of the third season of The X Factor (U.S.) on November 28, 2013. On December 31, 2013, Lovato performed it at ET Canada's New Year's Eve televised show. On May 21, 2014, Lovato performed the song along with "Really Don't Care" at the thirteenth season finale of American Idol along with the Top 13 female contestants. The song was also a part of Lovato's setlist for The Neon Lights Tour (2014), the Demi World Tour (2014–2015) and the Future Now Tour (2016). In May 2015, she performed the song on 2nd Indonesian Choice Awards along with "Give Your Heart a Break" and "Heart Attack". On August 31, 2015, Lovato sang it on Jimmy Kimmel Live! as well as promoting "Cool for the Summer". On May 14, 2016, Lovato performed "Neon Lights" as a part of her setlist at the 2016 edition of Wango Tango.

== Formats and track listings ==
- Digital download
1. "Neon Lights" – 3:53
2. "Neon Lights" (Cole Plante with Myon & Shane 54 Remix) – 6:04
- Digital remixes – EP
1. "Neon Lights" (Radio Version) – 3:38
2. "Neon Lights" (Betty Who Remix) – 3:17
3. "Neon Lights" (Cole Plante with Myon & Shane 54 Remix) – 6:04
4. "Neon Lights" (Jump Smokers Remix) – 4:06
5. "Neon Lights" (Belanger Remix) – 5:17
6. "Neon Lights" (Tracy Young Remix) – 7:26

== Credits and personnel ==
Recording and management

- Recorded at Patriot Studios (Denver) and Eargasm Studios (Santa Monica)
- Mixed at MixStar Studios (Virginia Beach)
- Mastered at Sterling Sound Studios (New York City)
- Published by Not Your Average Girl/Silva Tone Music (ASCAP), Marchetti Music (BMI), Write 2 Live Publishing (ASCAP), Blastronaut Publishing (BMI), Songs of Patriot Games, Seven Peaks Music (ASCAP) and Demi Lovato Publishing (ASCAP)

Personnel

- Demi Lovato – vocals, songwriting
- Mario Marchetti – songwriting
- Tiffany Vartanyan – songwriting
- Ryan Tedder – songwriting, production, instrumentation, programming
- Noel Zancanella – songwriting, production, instrumentation, programming
- Smith Carlson – engineering
- Micah Johnson – engineering assistance
- Serban Ghenea – mixing
- John Hanes – engineered for mix
- Chris Gehringer – mastering

Credits adapted from the liner notes of Demi.

== Charts ==
=== Weekly charts ===
Weekly chart performance
Chart (2013–2014)	Peak position
Belgium (Ultratip Bubbling Under Flanders)	11
Belgium Dance (Ultratop Flanders)	38
Belgium (Ultratip Bubbling Under Wallonia)	15
Belgium Dance (Ultratop Wallonia)	17
Canada Hot 100 (Billboard)	40
Canada CHR/Top 40 (Billboard)	22
Canada Hot AC (Billboard)	35
Czech Republic Airplay (ČNS IFPI)	46
Finland Airplay (Radiosoittolista)	62
Ireland (IRMA)	67
Israel International Airplay (Media Forest)	3
Israel (Media Forest TV Airplay)	1
Luxembourg Digital Songs (Billboard)	14
Mexico Anglo (Monitor Latino)	16
New Zealand (Recorded Music NZ)	12
Scotland Singles (OCC)	9
Slovenia (SloTop50)	46
UK Singles (OCC)	15
US Billboard Hot 100	36
US Adult Pop Airplay (Billboard)	20
US Dance/Mix Show Airplay (Billboard)	17
US Dance Club Songs (Billboard)	1
US Pop Airplay (Billboard)	7
Venezuela Pop Rock (Record Report)	10

=== Year-end charts ===
Annual chart rankings
Chart (2014)	Position
US Pop Songs (Billboard)	39
US Hot Dance/Club Songs (Billboard)	31

== Certifications ==
Region	Certification	Certified units/sales
Australia (ARIA)	Gold	35,000^{‡}
Brazil (Pro-Música Brasil)	2× Platinum	120,000^{‡}
New Zealand (RMNZ)	Platinum	15,000^{*}
Norway (IFPI Norway)	Platinum	60,000^{‡}
United Kingdom (BPI)	Silver	200,000^{‡}
United States (RIAA)	2× Platinum	2,000,000^{‡}
^{*} Sales figures based on certification alone.^{‡} Sales+streaming figures based on certification alone.

== Release history ==
Country	Date	Format	Ref.
United States	November 19, 2013	Digital download	
United States	November 19, 2013	Mainstream airplay	
Italy	November 22, 2013	Contemporary hit radio	
United Kingdom	June 15, 2014	Digital download	

== "Neon Lights (Rock Version)" ==
"Neon Lights" (rock version)

Song by Demi Lovato and the Maine

from the album Revamped
- Released: September 15, 2023
- Studio: SuCasa Recording (Sherman Oaks, CA)
- Genre: Dance-rock; alternative rock
- Songwriters: Demi Lovato; Mario Marchetti; Tiffany Vartanyan; Ryan Tedder; Noel Zancanella

"Neon Lights (Rock Version)" is the re-recorded version of "Neon Lights" by American singer-songwriter Demi Lovato with American rock band the Maine. It was released on September 15, 2023, as a track on Revamped, Lovato's first remix album.

== See also ==
- List of number-one dance singles of 2014 (U.S.)
