= Let It Go =

Song from Disney's 2013 film Frozen

- Remixes cover

Single by Idina Menzel

from the album Frozen: Original Motion Picture Soundtrack
- Published: Wonderland Music Company
- Released: January 2014
- Recorded: 2012 (piano, vocals); 2013 (rhythm section, orchestra)
- Studio: Eastwood Scoring Stage (Burbank, CA) (orchestra); Sunset Sound Studios (Hollywood, CA)
- Genre: Show tune; orchestral pop
- Length: 3:44
- Label: Walt Disney
- Songwriters: Kristen Anderson-Lopez; Robert Lopez
- Producers: Kristen Anderson-Lopez; Robert Lopez; Christophe Beck; Chris Montan; Tom MacDougall

Idina Menzel singles chronology
"You Learn to Live Without" (2013)	"Let It Go" (2014)	"Baby, It's Cold Outside" (2014)

Music video (film sequence)
- "Let It Go" on YouTube

"Let It Go" is a song from Disney's 2013 computer-animated feature film Frozen, written by husband-and-wife songwriting team Robert Lopez and Kristen Anderson-Lopez. The song was performed in its original show-tune version in the film by American actress and singer Idina Menzel in her vocal role as Queen Elsa. It was later released as a single, being promoted to adult contemporary radio by Walt Disney Records in January 2014. Anderson-Lopez and Lopez also composed a simplified pop version (with shorter lyrics and background chorus) which was performed by actress and singer Demi Lovato over the start of the film's closing credits. Disney's music division planned to release Lovato's version of the song before Menzel's, as they did not consider Menzel's version a traditional pop song. A music video was released separately for Lovato's version.

The song was a commercial success, becoming the first song from a Disney animated musical to reach the top ten of the Billboard Hot 100 since 1995, when Vanessa L. Williams's "Colors of the Wind" from Pocahontas peaked at number four on the chart. The song is also Menzel's first single to reach the top 10 on the Billboard Hot 100 chart, making her the first Tony Award winner for acting to ever reach the top 10. The song was the ninth-best-selling song of 2014 in the United States, with 3.37 million copies sold in that year. As of December 2014, the song had sold 3.5 million copies in the US. It was the biggest-selling foreign song from any original soundtrack in South Korea as of March 12, 2014.

The song presents Queen Elsa, who flees her kingdom after she accidentally demonstrates her ability to generate ice in public. Up in the mountains and away from the townspeople, Elsa realizes that she no longer needs to hide her magic and rejoices in not only being able to use her power freely but also the freedom from others' expectations of her as a royal. She sheds her royal accessories, creates a living snowman, and builds an ice castle for herself.

"Let It Go" reached the top five on the Billboard Hot 100 chart, and won both the Academy Award for Best Original Song in 2014 and the Grammy Award for Best Song Written for Visual Media in 2015. The song gained international recognition, becoming one of the most globally recorded Disney songs, with versions sung in 25 languages for the film's international releases.

According to the International Federation of the Phonographic Industry, "Let It Go" sold 10.9 million copies in 2014, becoming the year's fifth best-selling song.

A remix EP was released digitally by Walt Disney Records on May 19, 2014. The EP features four remixes by Dave Audé, Papercha$er, DJ Escape & Tony Coluccio and Corbin Hayes. Armin van Buuren produced another trance remix of the song for the remix album, Dconstructed.

== History and use in Frozen ==
=== Background and composition ===
The Daily Telegraph explained that instead of the villain originally envisioned by the producers, the songwriters saw Elsa as "a scared girl struggling to control and come to terms with her gift". When interviewed in January 2014 by John August and Aline Brosh McKenna, Frozen director Jennifer Lee gave her recollection of the song's conception: "Bobby and Kristen said they were walking in Prospect Park, and they just started talking about what would it feel like [to be Elsa]. Forget villain. Just what it would feel like. And this concept of letting out who she is[,] that she's kept to herself for so long[,] and she's alone and free, but then the sadness of the fact [sic] that the last moment is she's alone. It's not a perfect thing, but it's powerful."

"Let It Go" was the first song written by Kristen Anderson-Lopez and Robert Lopez for the film that made it in, since songs composed earlier were eventually cut. The story outline they were given had a place reserved for "Elsa's Badass Song", which was what they were trying to write. The duo took inspiration from the songs of the Disney Renaissance such as The Little Mermaid and Beauty and the Beast and various artists, including Adele, Aimee Mann, Avril Lavigne (whose 2002 debut album incidentally is titled Let Go), Lady Gaga, and Carole King. The song finally began to gel one day as the couple walked together from their home in Park Slope to nearby Prospect Park while they were "thinking from an emo kind of place". Anderson-Lopez explained what happened next: "We went for a walk in Prospect Park and threw phrases at each other. What does it feel like to be the perfect exalted person, but only because you've held back this secret? Bobby came up with 'kingdom of isolation', and it worked." Lopez was able to improvise the song's first four lines on the spot. Back at their home studio, they composed the rest of the song by alternating between improvising melodies on a piano and brainstorming lyrics on a whiteboard, and finished it within a single day.

"Let It Go" is a power ballad and musical number in the key of A-flat major overall, but begins in the relative minor (F minor). The song is in quadruple meter, and has a fast tempo of around 137 beats per minute (allegro). The song's vocal range spans from F_{3} to E♭_{5}. Anderson-Lopez and Lopez specifically wrote the song for Idina Menzel, referring to her as "one of the most glorious voices of Broadway and an icon in musical theater". Menzel's vocal range was taken under consideration during the music's composition, as she was well able to span three octaves. The song was originally written a half-step lower, in the key of G. During recording, Menzel felt it sounded "womanly" and "sultry" and suggested raising the key to make it more "innocent" and "juvenile", which also made it more challenging to perform.

=== Recording ===
For each song they created, including "Let It Go", Anderson-Lopez and Lopez recorded a demo in their studio, then emailed it to the Disney Animation production team in Burbank for discussion at their next videoconference. After the film's release, Anderson-Lopez was shown an "explicitly honest" fan version of the song with very colorful lyrics, and in response, she noted that in the videoconferences she herself had used similarly candid language to describe Elsa's mindset at that point in the plot: "After a while, Chris Montan, the head of music at Disney, would be like, 'Whoa, language!'" She also disclosed that Disney Animation's Chief Creative Officer John Lasseter (who served as executive producer for Frozen) was so taken with "Let It Go" that he played her original demo of the song in his car for months.

Once approved, the song's piano-vocal score, along with the rest of their work for Frozen, was eventually forwarded to arranger David Metzger at his home studio in Salem, Oregon, who orchestrated their work into a lush sound suitable for recording by a full orchestra at the Eastwood Scoring Stage on the Warner Bros. studio lot in Burbank at the end of July 2013. The song's vocal track was recorded separately prior to orchestration at Sunset Sound in Hollywood, with the piano track from the demo playing into Menzel's headphones. That piano track, played by Lopez himself, was not re-recorded by a session musician at the orchestral recording session; it is the same piano track heard in the final mix of the song.

=== Character rewrite and film sequence ===
Although unintentional, the song's composition was pivotal in the film's characterization of Elsa. Although Elsa was originally written as a villain, co-directors Chris Buck and Lee gradually rewrote Elsa into one of the film's protagonists after "Let It Go" was composed. About that, Lee later explained: "the minute we heard the song the first time, I knew that I had to rewrite the whole movie". Buck further clarified: "Jen had to go back and rewrite some pages in the first act to build up to that scene ... You have to set it up well enough in advance so that when the song comes, the audience is ready for it and there's an emotional payoff."

When it came to animating Elsa's scenes for the song, Lopez and Anderson-Lopez insisted on the particular detail that Elsa should slam the palace doors on the audience at the song's end, which they acknowledged was similar to the ending of the Broadway musical Sweeney Todd. Lopez explained that they wanted that feeling of how "this character doesn't need us anymore", because he had always loved that feeling "when a character just kind of malevolently looks at you and slams a door in your face", although in the final version, Elsa's facial expression ended up as more of a "sly smile". According to Lopez, it was the last line at the end, "the cold never bothered me anyway", that was "our little Avril Lavigne line".

On December 6, 2013, Walt Disney Animation Studios released a video of the entire "Let It Go" sequence as seen in the movie. On January 30, 2014, a sing-along version of the sequence was released.

== International versions ==
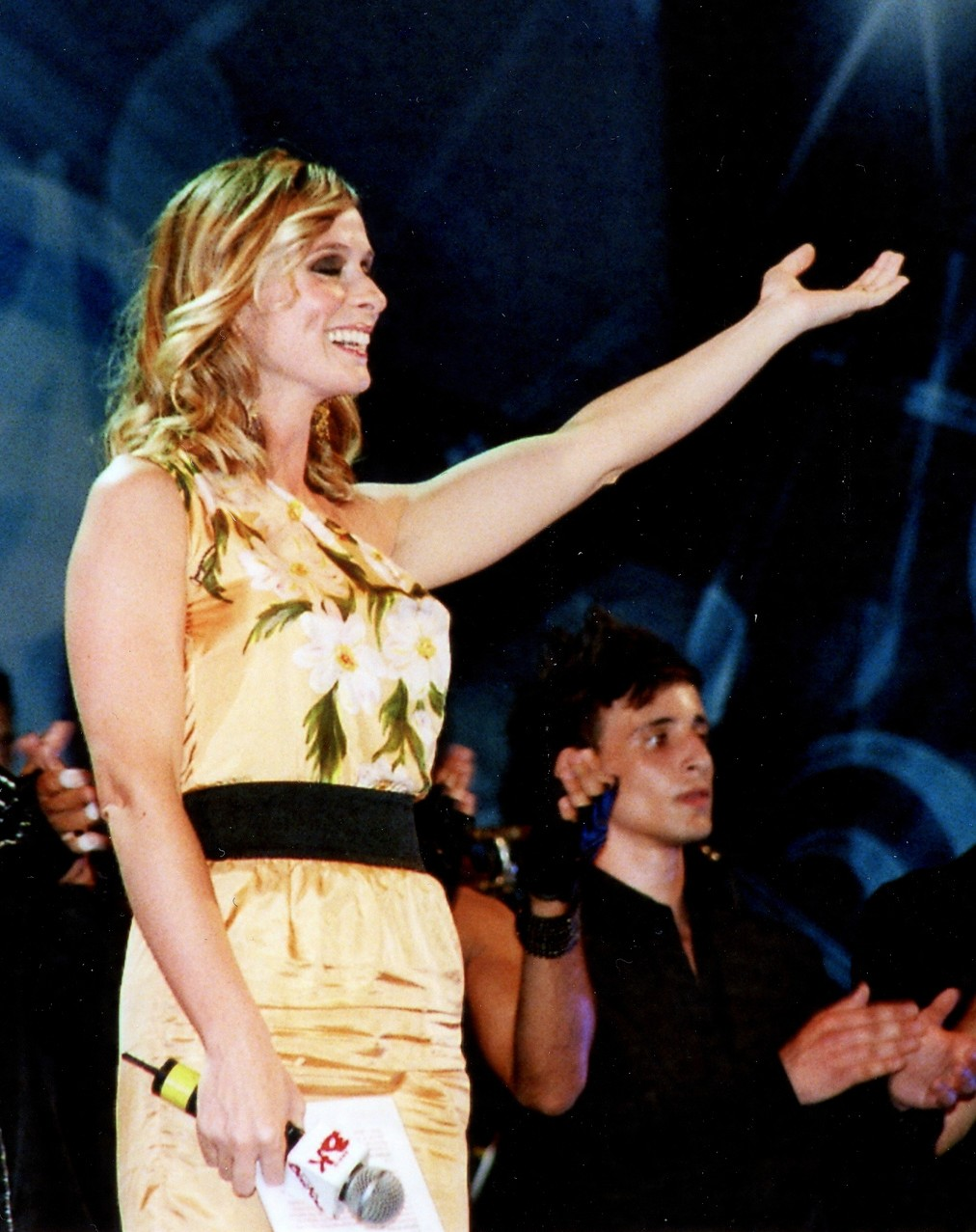
Italian actress and singer Serena Autieri and the Italian cast of Frozen were awarded the best foreign dubbing worldwide

Besides the original English version, Disney Character Voices International arranged for Frozen to be dubbed into another 41 languages and dialects worldwide, to which 3 more versions were added in the following years, raising the number of official versions to 44. A major challenge was to find sopranos capable of matching Menzel's warm vocal tone and vocal range in their native languages. Rick Dempsey, senior executive at Disney Character Voices International regarded the process as "exceptionally challenging", explaining: "It's a difficult juggling act to get the right intent of the lyrics and also have it match rhythmically to the music. And then you have to go back and adjust for lip sync! [It] ... requires a lot of patience and precision".

On January 22, 2014, Disney released a multi-language version of the "Let It Go" musical sequence, which featured vocal performances of 25 different voice actresses who portrayed Elsa in their respective dubbing versions of the film. At the annual meeting of the shareholders of the Walt Disney Company on March 18, 2014, in Portland, Oregon, chairman and chief executive officer Bob Iger praised the team who did "an incredible job casting fantastic international talent so that Frozen truly belongs to the world", then showed the entire multi-language video clip of "Let It Go" to the assembled shareholders. On March 31, 2014, an in-studio multi-language video of the song was released, showing singers of 25 different languages recording their versions of "Let It Go".

On April 15, 2014, Walt Disney Records released a compilation album titled Let It Go: The Complete Set, with all 42 foreign-language film versions of "Let It Go" and nine end credit versions.

The Italian version, along with the whole Italian adaptation of the movie, was awarded the best foreign dubbing worldwide.

In South Korea, the Korean version of the song by Hyolyn reached number 6 on the Gaon Music Chart, selling over 300,000 digital downloads. It also peaked at number 5 on the Korean Hot 100 chart. Japanese versions of the song performed by Takako Matsu reached number 2 on the Japan Hot 100 after the film's Japan release in March 2014 and was certified a million for digital downloads in Japan in May 2014.

== Reception ==
=== Critical reception ===
"Let It Go" received widespread acclaim from film critics, music critics, and audiences, with some comparing it favorably to "Defying Gravity" (also performed by Menzel) from the Broadway musical Wicked. The Rochester City Newspaper called it the best song of the film's soundtrack, writing: "Performed with belty gusto by Idina Menzel, it's got every element needed to be a lasting favorite. ... Menzel should be credited for providing as much power and passion to this performance as she did in her most famous role", alluding to Menzel's portrayal of Elphaba in Wicked. Entertainment Weekly's Marc Snetiker described the song as "an incredible anthem of liberation", while Joe Dziemianowicz of New York Daily News called it "a stirring tribute to girl power and the need to 'let go' of fear and shame".

On the other hand, Jim DeRogatis and Greg Kot of the radio show Sound Opinions criticized the song; DeRogatis labeled it "schlock", and Kot described it as a "clichéd piece of fluff that you would have heard on a Broadway soundtrack from maybe the fifties or the sixties".

By spring 2014, many journalists had observed that after watching Frozen, numerous young children in the United States were becoming unusually obsessed with the film's music, and with "Let It Go" in particular. Columnist Yvonne Abraham of The Boston Globe called the song "musical crack" which "sends kids into altered states". A similar phenomenon was described in the United Kingdom.

=== Perceived parallels ===
Some viewers outside the film industry, including one evangelical pastor and commentators, believe that the film is a promotion for the normalization of homosexuality, while others have argued that the character of Elsa is a representation of positive LGBTQ youth and the song is a metaphor for coming out. The LGBTQ community, however, had a mixed reaction to these claims. When Frozen co-director Jennifer Lee was asked about the purported gay undertones, she stated that the film's meaning was open to interpretation: "I feel like once we hand the film over, it belongs to the world, so I don't like to say anything, and let the fans talk. I think it's up to them." Lee added that the film's meaning was also inevitably going to be interpreted within the cultural context of being made in the year 2013.

Another interpretation for the song and the movie is that they promote self-affirmation for people with disabilities, especially those on the autism spectrum. Co-writer Kristen Andersen-Lopez has stated that her younger brother has autistic traits and that inspired the song insofar as it deals with the concept of having a "special sibling".

In November 2017, Chilean pop singer Jaime Ciero sued Disney, Idina Menzel, and Demi Lovato, claiming that "Let It Go" was extremely similar to his 2008 song "Volar". Ciero dropped the suit in May 2019.

=== Accolades ===
"Let It Go" won the Academy Award for Best Original Song at the 86th Academy Awards, where a shortened rendition of the show-tune version was performed live by Menzel; with the award, Robert Lopez became one of few people to have won an Emmy, Grammy, Oscar, and Tony.

Awards
Award	Category	Result
Academy Awards	Best Original Song	Won
Grammy Awards	Best Song Written for Visual Media	Won
Golden Globe Awards	Best Original Song	Nominated
Critics' Choice Awards	Best Song	Won
Phoenix Film Critics Society	Best Original Song	Won
Denver Film Critics Society	Best Original Song	Won
Satellite Awards	Best Original Song	Nominated
Radio Disney Music Awards	Favorite Song from a Movie or TV Show	Won
Billboard Music Awards	Top Streaming Song (Video)	Nominated

== Track listing ==
No.	Title	Length
1.	"Let It Go" (Dave Audé club remix)	5:48
2.	"Let It Go" (Papercha$er club remix)	4:51
3.	"Let It Go" (DJ Escape & Tony Coluccio club remix)	8:26
4.	"Let It Go" (Corbin Hayes remix)	6:48
Total length:		25:53

== Charts ==
=== Weekly charts ===
Chart (2013–2015)	Peak position
Australia (ARIA)	16
Austria (Ö3 Austria Top 40)	74
Belgium (Ultratip Bubbling Under Flanders)	55
Belgium (Ultratip Bubbling Under Flanders) "Laat het los" by Elke Buyle	13
Belgium (Ultratop 50 Wallonia) "Libérée, délivrée" by Anaïs Delva	26
Brazil Hot 100 (Billboard Brasil)	91
Canada Hot 100 (Billboard)	18
Denmark (Tracklisten)	34
Denmark (Tracklisten) "Lad det ske" by Maria Lucia Heiberg Rosenberg	40
France (SNEP) "Libérée, délivrée" by Anaïs Delva	12
Germany (GfK) "Lass jetzt los" by Willemijn Verkaik	93
Ireland (IRMA)	7
Japan Hot 100 (Billboard)	4
Netherlands (Single Top 100)	67
Netherlands (Single Top 100) "Laat het los" by Willemijn Verkaik	104
New Zealand (Recorded Music NZ)	31
Scottish Singles Sales (Official Charts)	10
South Korea (Gaon)	1
Sweden (Sverigetopplistan)	15
Sweden Heatseeker (Sverigetopplistan) "Slå dig fri" by Annika Herlitz	5
UK Singles (Official Charts)	11
US Billboard Hot 100	5
US Adult Contemporary (Billboard)	9
US Adult Pop Airplay (Billboard)	20
US Dance Club Songs (Billboard)	1

=== Year-end charts ===
Chart (2014)	Position
Australia (ARIA)	25
Canada (Canadian Hot 100)	79
Ireland (IRMA)	11
Japan (Japan Hot 100)	30
Japan Adult Contemporary (Billboard)	12
Japan Adult Contemporary (Billboard) "レット・イット・ゴー〜ありのままで〜" by Takako Matsu	15
Sweden (Sverigetopplistan)	59
UK Singles (Official Charts Company)	10
US Billboard Hot 100	21
US Adult Contemporary (Billboard)	23
US Dance Club Songs (Billboard)	12

=== Decade-end charts ===
Chart (2010–2019)	Position
UK Singles (Official Charts Company)	88

== Certifications ==
Region	Certification	Certified units/sales
Australia (ARIA)	8× Platinum	560,000^{‡}
Brazil (Pro-Música Brasil)	Platinum	60,000^{‡}
Canada (Music Canada)	8× Platinum	640,000^{‡}
Denmark (IFPI Danmark)	Gold	45,000^{‡}
Denmark (IFPI Danmark) Danish version, performed by Maria Lucia Heiberg Rosenberg	Platinum	90,000^{‡}
Germany (BVMI)	Gold	300,000^{‡}
Germany (BVMI) German version, performed by Willemijn Verkaik	Gold	150,000^{‡}
Italy (FIMI) Italian version, performed by Serena Autieri	Platinum	30,000^{‡}
Japan (RIAJ) Digital single	2× Platinum	500,000^{*}
New Zealand (RMNZ)	4× Platinum	120,000^{‡}
South Korea	—	1,737,107
Spain (Promusicae)	Gold	30,000^{‡}
United Kingdom (BPI)	5× Platinum	3,000,000^{‡}
United States (RIAA)	11× Platinum	11,000,000^{‡}
^{*} Sales figures based on certification alone.^{‡} Sales+streaming figures based on certification alone.

== Demi Lovato version ==
"Let It Go"

Single by Demi Lovato

from the album Frozen: Original Motion Picture Soundtrack
- Released: October 21, 2013
- Recorded: 2012
- Genre: Pop rock
- Length: 3:47
- Label: Walt Disney; Hollywood
- Songwriters: Kristen Anderson-Lopez; Robert Lopez
- Producers: Emanuel Kiriakou; Andrew Goldstein

Demi Lovato singles chronology
"Made in the USA" (2013)	"Let It Go" (2013)	"Neon Lights" (2013)

Music video
- "Let It Go" on YouTube

The decision to release a single for "Let It Go" was made after the song was written and was presented to Disney. Kristen Anderson-Lopez and Robert Lopez selected American singer and former Disney Channel star Demi Lovato—who also appeared on Disney's Hollywood Records roster, until 2018—to cover the song on the soundtrack album. It was also included in the deluxe edition of Lovato's fourth studio album, Demi (2013).

=== International versions ===
Lovato's version was officially released in nine other languages, eight of which are included into "Let It Go the Complete Set": French, Indonesian, Italian, Japanese, Kazakh, Korean, Malay, Mandarin Chinese (China's version), Spanish (Latin American version) and Russian. The Indonesian pop version was released as leading single of We Love Disney, Indonesia. Anaïs Delva and Marsha Milan, who performed the song in French and Malay respectively, also voiced Elsa in the movie, performing the same song in its movie version.

In South Korea, the pop version of the song by Hyolyn reached number six on the Gaon Music Chart in February, while the Japanese versions of the song, performed by May J., reached number 8 on the Japan Hot 100 after the film's Japanese release in March 2014 and was certified platinum for 250,000 downloads. May J. recorded a rearranged version of the song on her album Heartful Song Covers, which was released on March 26, 2014.

Highlighted versions were released later than 2013

"Let It Go" (end credits version) worldwide
Language	Performer(s)	Title	Translation
Mandarin Chinese (China)	姚贝娜 (Bella Yao)	"随它吧" ("Suí tā ba")	"Let it be"
English	Demi Lovato	"Let it Go"	
French	Anaïs Delva	"Libérée, délivrée"	"Freed, released"
Indonesian	Anggun, Chilla Kiana, Regina Ivanova, Nowela and Cindy Bernadette	"Lepaskan"	"Let it go"
Italian	Martina Stoessel	"All'alba sorgerò"	"I will rise at dawn"
Japanese	May J.	"レット・イット・ゴー ～ありのままで～" ("Retto itto go ~ari no mama de~")	"Let it go ~ As I am"
Kazakh	Айнұр Бермұхамбетова (Aynur Bermuxambetova)	"Қанат қақ, қалықта" ("Ķanat ķaķ, ķalyķta")	"Flap your wings and soar"
Korean	효린 (Hyolyn)	"Let It go"	
Spanish (Latin America)	Martina Stoessel	"Libre soy"	"I'm free"
Malay	Marsha Milan Londoh	"Bebaskan"	"Set it free"
Russian	Юлия Довганишина (Yuliya Dovganishina)	"Отпусти и забудь" ("Otpusti i zabud'")	"Let it go and forget"

=== Background, release, and composition ===
Anderson-Lopez said that choosing Lovato was inspired by the singer's own past experiences, which were "similar to Elsa's journey of leaving a dark past and fear behind and moving forward with your power". Lovato indeed identified with the song's context, stating: "It's so relatable. Elsa is finding her identity; she's growing into who she is and she's finally accepting her own strength and magical powers. Instead of hiding it, like she's done all her life, she's letting it go and embracing it."

Lovato's cover version was released as a single by Walt Disney Records on October 21, 2013. While Menzel's version is performed in the key of A-flat major and a tempo of 137 beats per minute, Lovato's version is performed in the key of G major and a tempo of 140 beats per minute, with Lovato's vocal range spanning from the low note of G_{3} to the high note of E_{5}. In this version, the line "Let the storm rage on" is omitted from the chorus, along with its unusual accompanying chord progression, and an extra "Let it go" is substituted in its place.

=== Music video ===
The music video was released on November 1, 2013. It was directed by Declan Whitebloom.

=== Personnel ===
- Demi Lovato – vocals
- Julia Michaels – background vocals
- Andrew Goldstein, Emanuel Kiriakou – keyboards, guitar, programmer, producer
- Doug Petty – additional keyboards
- Șerban Ghenea – mixing engineer

=== Live performances ===
Lovato performed the song on several occasions. She first performed the track at the 2013 Disney Parks Christmas Day Parade. On November 13, 2014, Lovato performed the song at the 2014 Royal Variety Performance. The song was also a part of her setlist for The Neon Lights Tour and the Demi World Tour. In May 2015, Lovato performed the song at the 2nd Indonesian Choice Awards.

=== Charts ===
==== Weekly charts ====
Chart (2013–2015)	Peak position
Australia (ARIA)	25
Austria (Ö3 Austria Top 40)	31
Belgium (Ultratop 50 Flanders)	15
Belgium (Ultratip Bubbling Under Wallonia)	21
Canada Hot 100 (Billboard)	31
Denmark (Tracklisten)	26
France (SNEP)	131
Germany (GfK)	65
Ireland (IRMA)	34
Italy (FIMI)	15
Japan Hot 100 (Billboard)	51
Netherlands (Single Top 100)	70
New Zealand (Recorded Music NZ)	13
Philippines (PARI)	1
Scottish Singles Sales (Official Charts)	32
South Korea (Gaon)	50
Spain (Promusicae) "Libre soy" by Martina Stoessel	29
Sweden (Sverigetopplistan)	25
Switzerland (Schweizer Hitparade)	60
UK Singles (Official Charts)	42
US Billboard Hot 100	38

==== Year-end charts ====
Chart (2014)	Rank
Belgium (Ultratop Flanders)	39
New Zealand (Recorded Music NZ)	27
Taiwan (Hito Radio)	3

=== Certifications ===
Region	Certification	Certified units/sales
Australia (ARIA)	2× Platinum	140,000^{‡}
Belgium (BRMA)	Gold	15,000^{*}
Brazil (Pro-Música Brasil)	Platinum	60,000^{‡}
Canada (Music Canada)	Platinum	80,000^{*}
Germany (BVMI)	Gold	150,000^{‡}
Italy (FIMI)	Gold	25,000^{‡}
Japan (RIAJ) Digital single	Gold	100,000^{*}
New Zealand (RMNZ)	Platinum	15,000^{*}
Norway (IFPI Norway)	Gold	30,000^{‡}
Sweden (GLF)	Platinum	40,000^{‡}
United Kingdom (BPI)	Gold	400,000^{‡}
United States (RIAA)	2× Platinum	1,100,000
Streaming
Denmark (IFPI Danmark)	Gold	1,300,000^{†}
^{*} Sales figures based on certification alone.^{‡} Sales+streaming figures based on certification alone.^{†} Streaming-only figures based on certification alone.

== Other cover versions ==
Many cover versions have been recorded internationally. In February 2014, Alex Boyé recorded a light Africanized tribal cover of the song, featuring the One Voice Children's Choir and Lexi Walker as Elsa.

The Piano Guys' cover version mixes parts of Antonio Vivaldi's Concerto No. 4 in F minor, Op. 8, RV 297, "L'inverno" (Winter) from The Four Seasons into the original. The music videos of both covers were filmed in the ice castles in Midway, Utah.

French deathcore/metalcore band Betraying the Martyrs covered "Let It Go", as a single from their album Phantom in July 2014.

In February 2014, a parody YouTuber by the name of Malinda Kathleen Reese used Google Translate to translate the song's lyrics between multiple languages and back to English, revealing expected humorous mistranslations, with lines such as "Let us very angry" and "Give up, tune in, slam the door."

Actress Lea Michele sang the song as her character Rachel Berry in the first episode of the sixth and final season of the Fox musical comedy-drama television series Glee. Idina Menzel portrayed Rachel's biological mother in the series.

Actress Maisie Williams sang the song in an Audi commercial that aired during the broadcast of Super Bowl LIV in early February 2020.

It has been alleged by some commentators that one of the promotional songs for the 2022 Winter Olympics, "The Snow and Ice Dance", had suspicious similarities with "Let It Go". A Chinese media outlet cited technical analysis of the two songs; both songs employ a piano as the major instrument, have similar prelude chords and an eight-beat introduction, and they run at almost exactly the same tempo.

During the Russian invasion of Ukraine, a video went viral around the world of a young child named Amelia Anisovych singing the song to families seeking refuge sheltering in a Kyiv basement. Kristen Anderson-Lopez (the song's co-writer) and Idina Menzel (who performed the song in the film) both tweeted support to the young girl.

== See also ==
- List of best-selling singles
- List of number-one dance singles of 2014 (U.S.)
