= Nightingale (Demi Lovato song) =

Song by Demi Lovato

from the album Demi
- Studio: Barefoot Recording (Los Angeles); EastWest Studios (Los Angeles)
- Length: 3:36
- Label: Hollywood
- Songwriters: Demi Lovato; Anne Preven; Matt Rad; Felicia Barton
- Producers: Matt Rad; Anne Preven

Music video
- "Nightingale" on YouTube

"Nightingale" is a song by American singer Demi Lovato from her fourth studio album Demi (2013). The song was written by Lovato, Anne Preven, Matt Rad, and Felicia Barton, while production was helmed by Rad and Preven served as a vocal producer.

== Composition ==
In the track Lovato looks for a hero, someone to lean on, singing, "Sing to me/ I know you're there/ 'Cause baby you're my sanity". During an interview with songwriter and record producer Emanuel Kiriakou, Lovato said: "Nightingale is definitely a personal song. It's about one of my friends, actually, that passed away when we were thirteen. I feel like, sometimes I literally, I know when he's in the room with me. And, I just have a really strong connection to him. I feel like he's my nightingale." In other words, Lovato feels like her friend is her guardian angel. The song is entirely dedicated to Lovato's friend Trenton Stout, who hanged himself at the age of thirteen.

== Critical reception ==
On May 9, 2013, in a track-by-track Billboard review, magazine music journalist Jason Lipshutz stated: "This is the type of ballad that Lovato makes look like a lay-up: the theatrical notes are in place, but so is the patience, maturity and attitude that establish the singer from her pop peers. "Nightingale" soars when Lovato is joined by a chorus of backup vocalists in its final passage; if she can perfect this song live, that finale could become enlightening".

== Music video ==
On December 24, 2014, Lovato released a music video on Vevo, shot in black and white, as an early Christmas present for her fans. "Thank you all so much for the most amazing year yet! My Lovatics are truly the best," Demi wrote on Twitter as she shared the video link. The video features a cameo appearance from American actor Wilmer Valderrama with whom she shares a kiss. The video follows Lovato on tour and shows love for her fans – the Lovatics – who serve as her nightingales. To date, the music video has garnered over 45 million views on Vevo.

== Live performances ==
Lovato first performed the song as a part of her brief piano-driven set during her interview with GRAMMY.com in October 2013. Lovato performed the song live on Good Morning America on June 6, 2014, as a part of her Summer Concert Series. The song was also a part of Lovato's setlist for The Neon Lights Tour, the Demi World Tour and the Future Now Tour.

== Credits and personnel ==
Recording and management

- Recorded at Barefoot Recording and East West Studios (Los Angeles)
- Mixed at MixStar Studios (Virginia Beach)
- Mastered at Sterling Sound Studios (New York City)
- Published by Shigshag Music (BMI), Radassyouvich/Pulse Recording Songs (ASCAP), Warner-Tamerlane Publishing Corp. (BMI), Songs of Pulse Recordings (BMI), Seven Peaks Music (ASCAP) and Demi Lovato Publishing (ASCAP)

Personnel

- Demi Lovato – lead vocals, songwriting
- Matt Rad – songwriting, production, background vocals, drum programming, engineering, keyboards, piano, string arrangements
- Anne Preven – songwriting, vocal production
- Felicia Barton – songwriting, background vocals
- Anton Patzner – string arrangements, violin, viola
- Lewis Patzner – cello
- Serban Ghenea – mixing
- John Hanes – engineered for mix
- Chris Gehringer – mastering

Credits adapted from Demi album liner notes.

== Chart performance ==
Chart (2014)	Peak position
US Twitter Top Tracks (Billboard)	35
