= The Neon Lights Tour =

2014 concert tour by Demi Lovato

- World tour by Demi Lovato
- Location: Europe; North America; South America
- Associated album: Demi
- Start date: February 9, 2014
- End date: June 16, 2014
- Legs: 3
- No. of shows: 44
- Box office: US $16.8 million (42 shows)

Demi Lovato concert chronology
- A Special Night with Demi Lovato (2011–2013); The Neon Lights Tour (2014); Demi World Tour (2014–2015)

The Neon Lights Tour was the third headlining concert tour by American singer Demi Lovato, in support of her fourth studio album, Demi (2013). The first leg of tour began in North America on February 9, 2014, at the Rogers Arena in Vancouver, British Columbia and ended on March 30, 2014, at Bankers Life Fieldhouse in Indianapolis, Indiana. The tour's second leg took place in both South America and Mexico. It started on April 22, 2014, at the Citibank Hall in São Paulo, Brazil and ended on May 17, 2014, at Arena Monterrey in Monterrey, Mexico.

== Background and development ==
On September 27, 2013, a video was published on Lovato's Facebook page with the words "Neon Lights" formed out of neon lights and at the end, it said: "Sunday 6PM EDT". On the following Sunday, the Neon Lights Tour was announced along with the dates. The tour is named after the third single from the album Demi, "Neon Lights". Fifth Harmony, Little Mix, Cher Lloyd, and magician Collins Key were featured as opening acts. Tickets became available on October 5, 2013. During the season finale of The X Factor 2013, Lovato announced her plans to leave the show, opting to focus on music and touring for 2014. When asked about her plans for the tour, Lovato stated "You can expect a show that I've never put on before, I'm really excited. Other shows I've had have been all about the music, but this time I want it to be about girl empowerment, I want it to be a huge party that everyone has fun at and leaves with an incredible experience." In the same interview, she teased about a possible cover collaboration on the tour with the girls of Fifth Harmony. Upon another interview Demi stated she had been working with longtime friend Nick Jonas on the show, stating "He's helping create the show for my tour next year, today we were talking about designs and music and how we can really make my show incredible and like nothing I've done.

On February 4, 2014, it was announced that Nick Jonas would be working as the Musical and Creative Director for the tour. Jonas told Rolling Stone "I'm overseeing video content, wardrobe, lighting, and staging, and then I'm extending into the musical side of things, which includes creating the arrangements for the songs. I'm building what Demi wanted, which is a show without stops and starts. Demi and I have the same manager, so I was immediately excited when I was offered the position. The relationship that Demi and I had over eight years really gives me the insight into how to best communicate with her and her team."I've been in rehearsals with the band for the last two weeks. The biggest challenge has been just trying to rethink some of the music and see how we could complement it with lights and video. I sat down with the band and said to them, 'You need to step into this like it's a new gig. None of these arrangements are going to sound like the originals, so you need to have an open mind.'"

== Promotion ==
Prior to beginning off the tour, Lovato released a teaser video on her YouTube channel displaying video content that would be used during the show. Nick Jonas told MTV News: "there's a lot of exclusive content for this tour. Demi came to the whole team just on the creative side — both video and music, and she said, 'I want to give fans something special for every bit of the show.'" Lovato went on to comment that one of her inspirations for the tour was Beyoncé, stating "I was also really inspired by Beyoncé, who had a music video for every single song on the album. Some of these I had music video ideas for a while, and I'm excited for people to see it." In the same interview, both Jonas and Lovato went on to describe the "re-imagining" of Lovato's older songs, saying she went online to see what her fans wanted to hear, and what Lovato had played on her last two tours. Jonas commented that "a lot of these songs aren't even the original arrangements. They've been completely re-imagined." Lovato also went on to say, "we've made them more current too, so we've transformed songs that went from being made a couple years ago to actually sounding like today's music."

== Concert synopsis ==
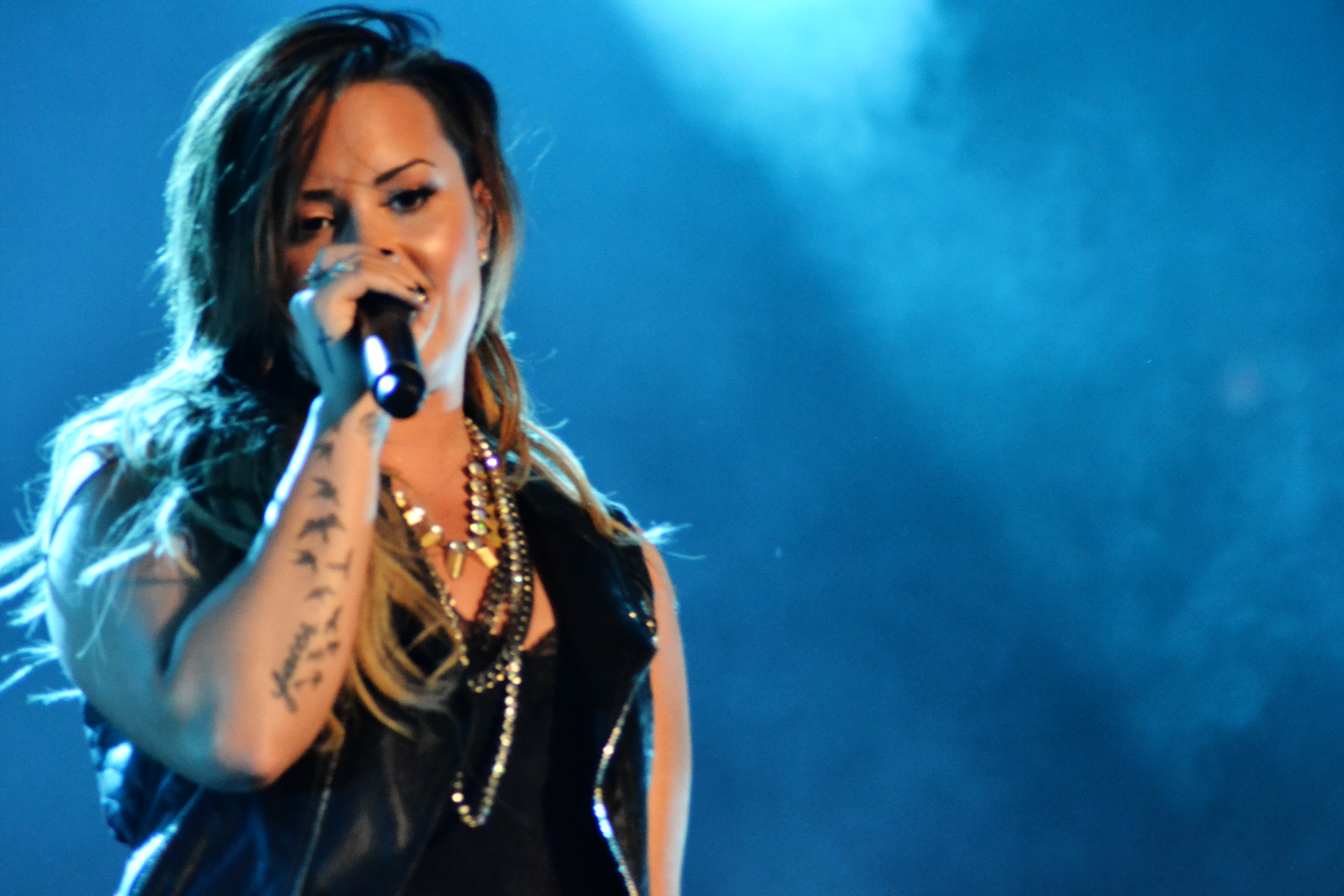
Lovato during The Neon Lights Tour in Belo Horizonte

The concert began with the black curtain opening and an opening underwater video sequence of Lovato, shown on the stage screens, accompanied with a black stage. The film showed heart beats, suggesting the opening song of "Heart Attack". At the end of the underwater video, shots of the "Heart Attack" video begin to appear, Lovato singing the opening lines, before rising up out of the stage, surrounded by jets of steam, and going on to sing "Heart Attack". "Remember December" is performed with an accompanying music video showing Lovato surrounded by snow, in a winter environment. The song is based on a brand new arrangement, with white stage lighting and strobe effects. "Fire Starter" sees the stage lit up with fire effects, while "The Middle" begins with Lovato playing a set of drums, before kicking off into the also newly arranged song, an accompanying video showing Lovato in a desert. "Really Don't Care" begins with Lovato leaning up against the lead guitarist center stage. The stage is then lit up in bright pink and blue to match the song's 'girl power' vibe. The stage is bathed in blue lights while Lovato slows down with renditions of "Stop the World", "Catch Me", and "Here We Go Again". These see Lovato play the guitar, and at certain US concerts she is joined by Nick Jonas, who accompanies her with a duet.

"Here We Go Again" is the most significantly changed song, made into a slow, sultry rock song. Lovato goes on to play "Made in the USA", "Nightingale", and "Two Pieces." At the end of "Two Pieces" Lovato heads down into the crowd, where she performs among the audience. At this point there is a guitar solo. "Warrior" sees Lovato strip down, playing the piano, an accompanying music video of her clad in armor being shown. Before this song Lovato gives a signature speech to each city, making it one of the most personal part of the concert. "Let It Go" is performed as a pop rock song, and at the end of "Don't Forget", a video montage is shown of Lovato's musical journey, displaying various music videos of her songs. She then breaks into "Got Dynamite" after saying "that was me throughout the years..... and then..... I grew up." "Unbroken" and "Neon Lights" are both the club style song of the tour, with Cole Plante joining as a guest DJ on the US shows. During "Neon Lights", fans are able to use their phones on the Demi Lovato Official App, where they light up in time with each other, the stage is lit with Neon Lights, with an accompanying video being shown. During the choruses, steam it blown at around the stage, and strobe lights are shone out. As the song closes Lovato is lowered back into the stage, confetti being blown around the arena.

The encore begins with video content showing the media response to Lovato being admitted to rehab in 2010. This is followed by highlights of her success since her recovery, and when the video concludes, Lovato enters the stage. This is the only outfit change of the show, with Lovato wearing a long black dress to sing "Skyscraper". At the final chorus Lovato is lifted off the stage on a platform, a series of spotlights directed upon her. Lovato closes the show by ripping her dress off to reveal the outfit that she wore for the rest of the show, and putting on a leather jacket to sing the final song, "Give Your Heart a Break" with the curtain closing ending the concert. Overall the concert uses significant amounts of pyrotechnics, lighting, and video content; with little choreography allowing Demi to use the stage in her signature rock style.

== Critical reception ==
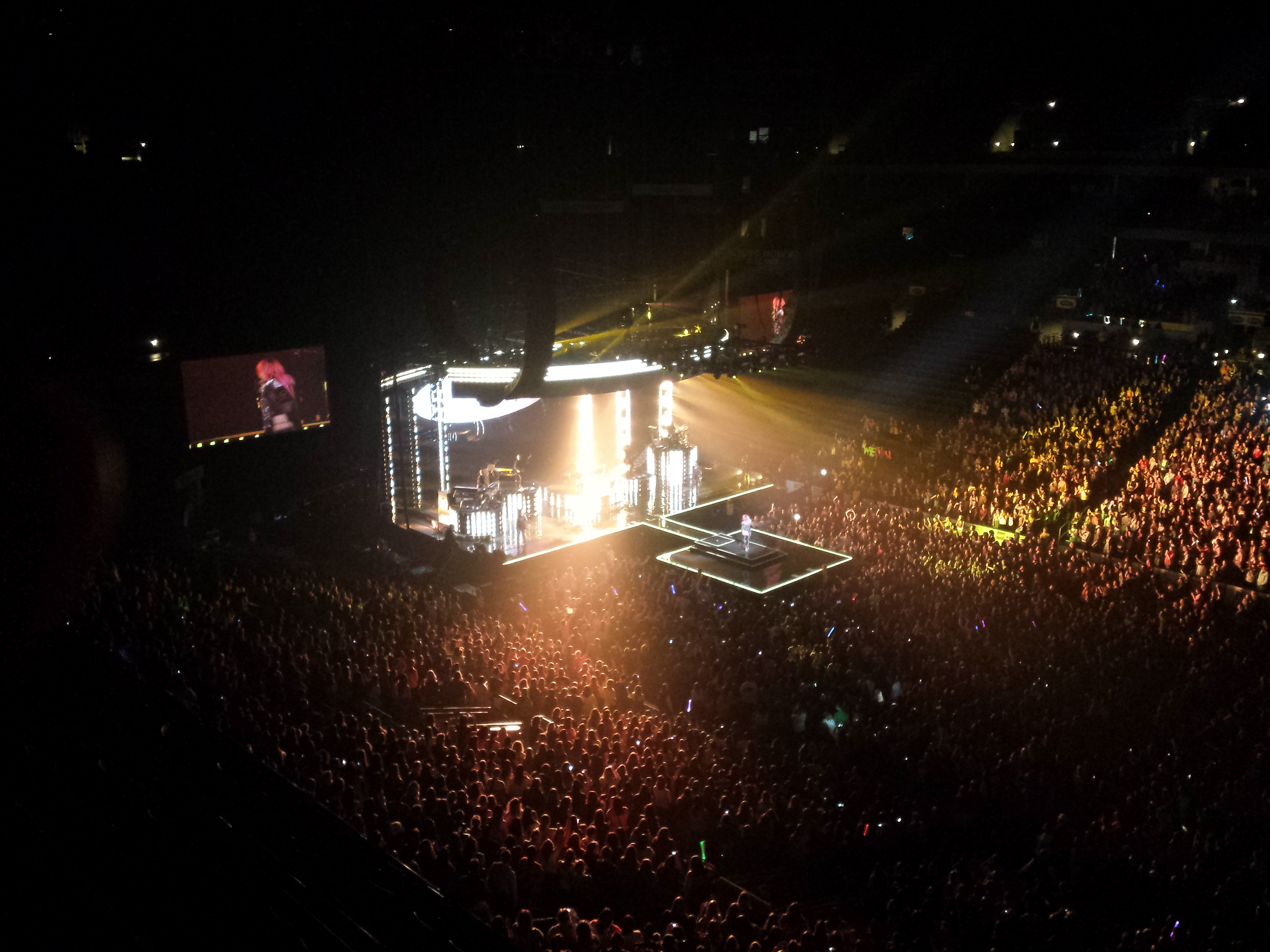
Lovato performing at Nationwide Arena on March 22

Jason Lipshutz from Billboard called the show "a highly enjoyable evening", and found the performance of "Neon Lights" to be the show's "most memorable moment". He also referred to the opening video for "Skyscraper" as being "A candid, surprisingly affecting montage." Mary Diaz from 99.7 NOW praised the show as "MORE than worth the wait!", deeming it "jam packed with talent, beauty, amazing voices, beautiful stage sets, and magic." Mike Wass from Idolator called the show "flashy yet strikingly intimate", stating "there was no choreography and only one costume change, but you don't need shiny distractions when you can belt out songs like Demi and connect with the crowd on such an emotional level. That's not to say that the production was boring. Far from it." Maychelle Ornos from International Business Times called the tour "epic" and "something to look forward to because Demi has taken all the steps to please and wow her fans." Kayla Ziadie of Sun-Sentinel also gave a positive review, feeling the show "truly began" with Lovato's performance of "Heart Attack". Jim Harrington from San Jose Mercury News gave a negative review, criticizing Lovato's live vocals and calling the show "just barely interesting enough to keep one's attention."

== Set list ==
This set list is from the performance in East Rutherford on March 7, 2014. It is not intended to represent all concerts from the tour.

1. "Heart Attack"
2. "Remember December"
3. "Fire Starter"
4. "The Middle"
5. "Really Don't Care"
6. "Stop the World"
7. "Catch Me"
8. "Here We Go Again"
9. "Made in the USA"
10. "Nightingale"
11. "Two Pieces"
12. "Warrior"
13. "Let It Go"
14. "Don't Forget"
15. "Get Back"/"This Is Me"/"La La Land"/"Here We Go Again"
16. "Got Dynamite"
17. "Unbroken"
18. "Neon Lights"

Encore

19. "Skyscraper"
20. "Give Your Heart a Break"

== Tour dates ==
List of 2014 concerts, showing date, city, country, venue, opening act, tickets sold, number of available tickets and amount of gross revenue
Date	City	Country	Venue	Opening act	Attendance	Revenue
February 9, 2014	Vancouver	Canada	Rogers Arena	Fifth Harmony; Little Mix; Collins Key	—N/a	—N/a
February 11, 2014	San Jose	United States	SAP Center	Fifth Harmony; Little Mix; Collins Key	—N/a	—N/a
February 13, 2014	Anaheim	United States	Honda Center	Fifth Harmony; Little Mix; Collins Key	—N/a	—N/a
February 15, 2014	Glendale	United States	Jobing.com Arena	Fifth Harmony; Little Mix; Collins Key	—N/a	—N/a
February 17, 2014	Grand Prairie	United States	Verizon Theatre at Grand Prairie	Fifth Harmony; Little Mix; Collins Key	—N/a	—N/a
February 19, 2014	Houston	United States	Toyota Center	Fifth Harmony; Little Mix; Collins Key	—N/a	—N/a
February 21, 2014	Atlanta	United States	Philips Arena	Fifth Harmony; Little Mix; Collins Key	8,813 / 8,813	$400,275
February 23, 2014	Charlotte	United States	Time Warner Cable Arena	Fifth Harmony; Little Mix; Collins Key	—N/a	—N/a
February 25, 2014	Sunrise	United States	BB&T Center	Fifth Harmony; Little Mix; Collins Key	—N/a	—N/a
February 26, 2014	Tampa	United States	Tampa Bay Times Forum	Fifth Harmony; Little Mix; Collins Key	—N/a	—N/a
March 1, 2014	Camden	United States	Susquehanna Bank Center	Fifth Harmony; Little Mix; Collins Key	—N/a	—N/a
March 2, 2014	Fairfax	United States	Patriot Center	Fifth Harmony; Little Mix; Collins Key	7,123 / 8,525	$357,973
March 4, 2014	Bethlehem	United States	Sands Bethlehem Event Center	Little Mix; Daniella Mason; Collins Key	—N/a	—N/a
March 5, 2014	Worcester	United States	DCU Center	Fifth Harmony; Little Mix; Collins Key	9,037 / 10,676	$421,463
March 7, 2014	East Rutherford	United States	Izod Center	Fifth Harmony; Little Mix; Collins Key	—N/a	—N/a
March 8, 2014	Wallingford	United States	Toyota Oakdale Theatre	Fifth Harmony; Little Mix; Collins Key	—N/a	—N/a
March 9, 2014	Wallingford	United States	Toyota Oakdale Theatre	Fifth Harmony; Little Mix; Collins Key	—N/a	—N/a
March 11, 2014	Uniondale	United States	Nassau Coliseum	Fifth Harmony; Little Mix; Collins Key	11,272 / 11,272	$537,637
March 13, 2014	Auburn Hills	United States	The Palace of Auburn Hills	Fifth Harmony; Little Mix; Collins Key	8,189 / 13,193	$326,596
March 14, 2014	Rosemont	United States	Allstate Arena	Fifth Harmony; Little Mix; Collins Key	—N/a	—N/a
March 16, 2014	Omaha	United States	CenturyLink Center Omaha	Fifth Harmony; Little Mix; Collins Key	—N/a	—N/a
March 18, 2014	Saint Paul	United States	Xcel Energy Center	Fifth Harmony; Little Mix; Collins Key	—N/a	—N/a
March 20, 2014	St. Louis	United States	Chaifetz Arena	Fifth Harmony; Cher Lloyd; Collins Key	—N/a	—N/a
March 22, 2014	Columbus	United States	Nationwide Arena	Fifth Harmony; Cher Lloyd; Collins Key	—N/a	—N/a
March 23, 2014	Grand Rapids	United States	Van Andel Arena	Fifth Harmony; Cher Lloyd; Collins Key	5,072 / 5,342	$264,360
March 26, 2014	Toronto	Canada	Air Canada Centre	Fifth Harmony; Cher Lloyd; Collins Key	11,085 / 11,085	$575,655
March 27, 2014	Cleveland	United States	Quicken Loans Arena	Fifth Harmony; Cher Lloyd; Collins Key	—N/a	—N/a
March 29, 2014	Nashville	United States	Bridgestone Arena	Fifth Harmony; Cher Lloyd; Collins Key	7,256 / 7,256	$352,432
March 30, 2014	Indianapolis	United States	Bankers Life Fieldhouse	Fifth Harmony; Cher Lloyd; Collins Key	—N/a	—N/a
April 22, 2014	São Paulo	Brazil	Citibank Hall	The Rosso Sisters	20,125 / 20,125	$1,472,530
April 24, 2014	São Paulo	Brazil	Citibank Hall	The Rosso Sisters	20,125 / 20,125	$1,472,530
April 25, 2014	São Paulo	Brazil	Citibank Hall	The Rosso Sisters	20,125 / 20,125	$1,472,530
April 27, 2014	Rio de Janeiro	Brazil	Citibank Hall	The Rosso Sisters	15,911 / 16,382	$1,104,220
April 28, 2014	Rio de Janeiro	Brazil	Citibank Hall	The Rosso Sisters	15,911 / 16,382	$1,104,220
April 30, 2014	Brasília	Brazil	NET Live Brasilia	The Rosso Sisters	15,733 / 15,733	$1,456,132
May 1, 2014	Belo Horizonte	Brazil	Chevrolet Hall	The Rosso Sisters	4,693 / 4,905	$348,350
May 3, 2014	Porto Alegre	Brazil	Pepsi on Stage	The Rosso Sisters	5,231 / 5,231	$401,067
May 6, 2014	Buenos Aires	Argentina	Luna Park	The Rosso Sisters	6,758 / 6,758	$536,690
May 8, 2014	Santiago	Chile	Movistar Arena	The Rosso Sisters	—N/a	—N/a
May 10, 2014	Guayaquil	Ecuador	Explanada del Palacio de Cristal	The Rosso Sisters	—N/a	—N/a
May 16, 2014	Mexico City	Mexico	Mexico City Arena	The Rosso Sisters	—N/a	—N/a
May 17, 2014	Monterrey	Mexico	Arena Monterrey	The Rosso Sisters	—N/a	—N/a
June 1, 2014	London	England	KOKO	—N/a	—N/a	—N/a
June 16, 2014 (Note: The June 16, 2014 concert in Los Angeles was part of 104.3 MY FM's My Big Night Out event.)	Los Angeles	United States	Hollywood Bowl	—N/a	—N/a	—N/a
Total					129,898 / 135,296 (96%)	$17,655,380

== Cancelled shows ==
List of cancelled concerts, showing date, city, country, venue, and reason for cancellation
Date	City	Country	Venue	Reason
May 12, 2014	Panama City	Panama	Figali Convention Center	Unexpected production conflicts.
May 14, 2014	Guatemala City	Guatemala	Domo Polideportivo	Unexpected production conflicts.

== Grossing ==
According to Pollstar, The Neon Lights Tour grossed $16.8 million in the first half of 2014 from 42 shows.
