= Give Your Heart a Break =

2012 single by Demi Lovato

Single by Demi Lovato

from the album Unbroken
- B-side: "Aftershock"; "Yes I Am"
- Released: January 23, 2012
- Recorded: 2011
- Studio: Robert Vosgien Mastering (Burbank, CA)
- Genre: Pop; R&B
- Length: 3:25
- Label: Hollywood
- Songwriters: Josh Alexander; Billy Steinberg
- Producers: Alexander; Steinberg

Demi Lovato singles chronology
"Skyscraper" (2011)	"Give Your Heart a Break" (2012)	"Heart Attack" (2013)

Music video
- "Give Your Heart a Break" on YouTube

"Give Your Heart a Break" is a song recorded by American singer Demi Lovato for her third studio album Unbroken (2011). It was released on January 23, 2012, by Hollywood Records, as the second and final single from the album. The song was written and produced by Josh Alexander and Billy Steinberg. "Give Your Heart a Break" incorporates drums, violin and strings. The latter two, according to music critics, are reminiscent of those used in Coldplay's "Viva la Vida". Lyrically, the song chronicles the protagonist's attempt to win over her lover who has been hurt in a previous relationship and is fearful of committing again. In 2023, the song was re-recorded for her rock-compilation Revamped with Bert McCracken from the rock band The Used.

"Give Your Heart a Break" received acclaim from music critics, who mostly praised the production and Lovato's vocals. The single debuted at number 70 on the Billboard Hot 100 and peaked at number 16 on the chart, as well as reaching number one on the Billboard Pop Songs chart. The song has debuted at number 33 in New Zealand and has peaked at number nine, marking the first time Lovato had two top 10 singles from one album in the country. The song is certified quadruple platinum in the US.

== Background ==
Originally, it was announced that the second single from the album would be "Who's That Boy" (featuring Dev), but this was later scrapped due to Dev's pregnancy. "Give Your Heart a Break" was written and produced by Josh Alexander and Billy Steinberg, who are known for her work on The Veronicas' sophomore studio album, Hook Me Up, as well as JoJo's "Too Little Too Late". Alexander is credited with having a bigger hand in the song's production, handling all the instruments while programming, recording and engineering the song. Chris Garcia shared engineering credits with Alexander while Scott Roewe is credited with providing Logic and Pro Tools technology. According to MTV, Lovato explained that despite the play on the word "heartbreak" in the title, the song is about the exact opposite. "Last year I began working on a song about a different kind of love," she said. "It's a song about showing someone you love that you're the one right in front of them. This is a song about faith."

== Composition ==
"Give Your Heart a Break" is three minutes and twenty-five seconds long. The song uses the instruments such as the suspenseful strings that sounds similar to that used in Coldplay's "Viva la Vida". According to the digital music sheet published at Musicnotes.com by Kobalt Music Publishing America, Inc., "Give Your Heart a Break" is written in the key of G♭ major. It is set in common time and has a moderate tempo of 120 beats per minute. The song follows the chord progression of C♭2 – G♭– A♭maj7(add 4) – D♭. Lovato's vocal range spans two octaves, from the low note of E♭_{3} to the high note of E♭_{5}.

== Critical reception ==
"Give Your Heart a Break" received acclaim from music critics. Joe DeAndrea of AbsolutePunk praised the song along with "Mistake" as ballads going "far and beyond anything in Lovato's prior arsenal. It sets a mark as to what should be expected from similar artists such as her, but in the process, distancing herself from being grouped with them becoming a solo entity." Jason Scott of the Seattle Post-Intelligencer noted that the song, along with "Mistake" and "Hold Up", feature "electrically forceful instrumentation". Jocelyn Vena of MTV complimented it as a smart dance song, along with "Hold Up".

In another extensive review, Laurence Green from musicOMH praised the track, calling it an "exceptionally brilliant track", while commenting that she had "become the true pop heroine; backed up by infinitely bigger, better choruses". Sam Lansky, a writer and editor for MTV's Buzzworthy Blog, lauded the recording for presenting Lovato's vocals as a masterpiece and praised the production as "superb".

Billboard and American Songwriter ranked the song number one and number eight, respectively, on their lists of the 10 greatest Demi Lovato songs.

== Chart performance ==
"Give Your Heart a Break" peaked at number 16 on the US Billboard Hot 100, marking Lovato's seventh highest-peaking single in the nation. The song topped the US Pop Songs chart, becoming Lovato's breakthrough hit on radio and her first number one there, while reaching number 12 on the US Adult Top 40 chart, number 16 on the US Adult Contemporary chart, and at number 21 on the US Digital Songs chart. With 25 weeks, "Give Your Heart a Break" previously shared the record of longest ascendance to the summit of the Mainstream Top 40 with Cee Lo Green's "Fuck You". In August 2021, Billboard revealed the song is Lovato's most-heard on US radio accumulating 2.9 billion all-format audience impressions.

Internationally, "Give Your Heart a Break" performed moderately; on the Belgium (Ultratop 50 Flanders) chart, the song peaked at number 32, her first appearance and highest position on the chart where it spent a total of nine weeks on the chart. In New Zealand, the song debuted at number 33, her third song to chart on the top 40 and has so far reached a peak of number nine, marking the first time Lovato had two top 10 singles from one album in the country. The song has been certified quadruple platinum by the Recording Industry Association of America.

== Music video ==
A collage of a photo of Lovato and on-screen love interest (Alex Bechet), created from other smaller images of the pair.

The music video for "Give Your Heart a Break" was filmed in late February 2012 and is directed by Justin Francis. The video premiered on E! on April 2, and was released by Vevo on April 3, 2012. A few teasers for the video were previously uploaded on Lovato's official YouTube channel. According to Lovato about "the new music video, I'm basically trying to convince a guy that I didn't break his heart, and we get into a fight and I try to win him over again" and "So I do something special for him at the end of the song".

The video begins with Lovato and her boyfriend (portrayed by Alex Bechet) having an argument over the phone. After hanging up, Lovato collects all the photos of them together from their apartment. Later that night, Lovato walks to her boyfriend's apartment and pastes the photos on a wall across the street from his front door. Each picture has a memory behind it, which is recounted by her. Lovato's boyfriend looks out the window as he sees a large collage of pictures, depicting a picture of them smiling. The video ends with Lovato walking away as she turns around and smiles, confident that her plan has worked.

A lyric video was released on December 23, 2011, which features Lovato sitting on the swing and writing the lyrics in a journal, right next to a waterfall and firepit, presumably writing her thoughts in the form of the song. At the end of the video, Lovato closes her journal and leaves it on the swing.

== Live performances ==
On December 31, 2011, Lovato promoted the song at the MTV New Year's Eve's concert, which she co-hosted with Tyler Posey. On January 11, 2012, Lovato performed the song at the People's Choice Awards, where she also received the "Best Pop Artist" award afterwards. On March 15, 2012, Lovato performed the single from the results show episode of American Idol season 11. The song was included on Lovato's set list for a free concert on July 6, 2012, as part of Good Morning America's Summer Concert Series. Lovato performed the song at the 2012 MTV Video Music Awards pre-show on September 6, 2012. On September 25, 2012, Lovato performed the song on Katie Couric's talk show Katie. Lovato performed the song at the VH1 Divas 2012, with the theme dance party on December 16, 2012. Three days later, Lovato performed the song with Fifth Harmony on the second-season finale of The X Factor. Lovato performed the song along with "Heart Attack" and "Neon Lights" at the 2nd Indonesian Choice Awards on May 24, 2015. Lovato performed the track during her headlining concert tours A Special Night with Demi Lovato, The Neon Lights Tour, Demi World Tour, Future Now Tour, and the Tell Me You Love Me World Tour.

== Credits and personnel ==
Recording and management

- Mixed at Cryptic Studios (Los Angeles, California)
- Mastered at Capitol Mastering (Los Angeles, California)
- Jerk Awake/Jetanon Music (ASCAP)

Personnel

- Demi Lovato – lead vocals, background vocals
- Josh Alexander – songwriting, production, recording, engineering, mixing, all instruments, programming
- Billy Steinberg – songwriting, production
- Chris Garcia – recording, engineering
- Scott Roewe – logic and Pro Tools
- Jaden Michaels – additional background vocals
- Robert Vosgien – mastering

Credits adapted from Unbroken liner notes.

== Accolades ==
Awards and nominations for "Anti-Hero"
Organization	Year	Category	Result	Ref.
Teen Choice Awards	2012	Choice Summer Song	Nominated	
Teen Choice Awards	2012	Choice Love Song	Nominated	

== Track listings ==
- CD single
1. "Give Your Heart a Break" – 3:25
2. "Give Your Heart a Break" (instrumental) – 3:25
3. "Give Your Heart a Break" (The Alias Radio Edit) – 3:43
- North America and Latin America digital single
1. "Give Your Heart a Break" (DJ Mike D Remix) –3:19
- International digital single
1. "Give Your Heart a Break" – 3:25
2. "Yes I Am" – 3:01
- International iTunes Store exclusive EP
1. "Give Your Heart a Break" – 3:25
2. "Give Your Heart a Break" (The Alias Club Mix) – 5:58
3. "Aftershock" – 3:10
4. "Yes I Am" – 3:01

== Charts ==
=== Weekly charts ===
Chart (2012–2013)	Peak position
Belgium (Ultratop 50 Flanders)	32
Brazil Hot 100 Airplay (Billboard Brasil)	39
Canada Hot 100 (Billboard)	19
France (SNEP)	162
Honduras (Honduras Top 50)	21
Japan Hot 100 (Billboard)	91
Lebanon (Lebanese Top 20)	11
New Zealand (Recorded Music NZ)	9
Slovakia Airplay (ČNS IFPI)	95
Turkey (Turkish Singles Chart)	19
UK Singles (Official Charts Company)	194
US Billboard Hot 100	16
US Adult Contemporary (Billboard)	16
US Adult Pop Airplay (Billboard)	12
US Dance Airplay (Billboard)	16
US Latin Pop Airplay (Billboard)	38
US Pop Airplay (Billboard)	1

=== Year-end charts ===
Chart (2012)	Position
Brazil (Billboard Hot Pop Songs)	21
Canada (Canadian Hot 100)	67
US Billboard Hot 100	39
US Adult Contemporary (Billboard)	42
US Adult Pop Songs (Billboard)	42
US Pop Songs (Billboard)	18

== Certifications ==
Region	Certification	Certified units/sales
Australia (ARIA)	Platinum	70,000^{‡}
Brazil (Pro-Música Brasil)	3× Platinum	180,000^{‡}
Denmark (IFPI Danmark)	Gold	45,000^{‡}
New Zealand (RMNZ)	Gold	7,500^{*}
United Kingdom (BPI)	Silver	200,000^{‡}
United States (RIAA)	4× Platinum	2,200,000
^{*} Sales figures based on certification alone.^{‡} Sales+streaming figures based on certification alone.

== Release history ==
List of release dates and formats for "Give Your Heart a Break"
Region	Release date	Format	Version	Ref.
United States	January 23, 2012	Hot adult contemporary	Original	
United States	January 24, 2012	Contemporary hit radio	Original	
Europe	April 4, 2012	Digital download	Original	
United Kingdom	May 14, 2012	Digital download	Original	
United States	December 11, 2012	Digital download	DJ Mike D Digital Remix	

== "Give Your Heart a Break (Rock Version)" ==
"Give Your Heart a Break (Rock Version)"

Song by Demi Lovato and Bert McCracken from The Used

from the album Revamped
- Released: September 15, 2023
- Studio: SuCasa (Los Angeles, CA)
- Genre: Rock
- Songwriters: Josh Alexander; Billy Steinberg

"Give Your Heart a Break (Rock Version)" is the re-recorded version of "Give Your Heart a Break" by American singer-songwriter Demi Lovato with American singer Bert McCracken from the American rock band The Used. It was released on September 15, 2023, as a track on Revamped, Lovato's first compilation album. The track was exclusively announced by Rolling Stone on July 14, 2023.

== See also ==
- List of Billboard Mainstream Top 40 number-one songs of 2012
- Billboard Year-End Hot 100 singles of 2012
