= Demi (album) =

2013 studio album by Demi Lovato

- Standard edition cover

Studio album by Demi Lovato
- Released: May 10, 2013
- Studios: Larrabee (Hollywood, California); The Lair (Los Angeles, California); SOMD Studios (Los Angeles, California); EastWest (Los Angeles, California); Patriot Studios (Denver, Colorado); Eargasm Studios (Santa Monica, California); Barefoot Recording (Los Angeles, California); Kinglet Studios (Stockholm, Sweden); Chalice Studios (Los Angeles, California); Cell 1 (London, England); Studio Elevator Nobody (Gothenburg, Sweden); Air Edel (London, England)
- Genre: Pop
- Length: 47:48
- Label: Hollywood
- Producers: Mitch Allan; Jason Evigan; Battleroy; Carl Falk; Andrew Goldstein; Jonas Jeberg; Emanuel Kiriakou; The Monsters and the Strangerz; Anne Preven; David Quiñones; Matt Rad; Rami Yacoub; Jarrad Rogers; Matt Squire; Ryan Tedder; Noel Zancanella

Demi Lovato chronology
Unbroken (2011)	Demi (2013)	Confident (2015)

Singles from Demi
- 1. "Heart Attack" Released: February 25, 2013; 2. "Made in the USA" Released: July 16, 2013; 3. "Neon Lights" Released: November 19, 2013; 4. "Really Don't Care" Released: May 20, 2014

Demi is the fourth studio album by American singer Demi Lovato. It was released on May 10, 2013, by Hollywood Records. Looking to transition from her self-described "generic" third album Unbroken (2011), Lovato wanted her fourth album to "have songs that excited her". Demi is primarily a pop record with elements of synth-pop, and bubblegum pop.

Demi received generally favorable reviews from music critics, who complimented Lovato's vocal performance. The album debuted at number three on the US Billboard 200 with first-week sales of 110,000 copies, and has been certified 2× platinum by the Recording Industry Association of America (RIAA). The album also reached the top five in Canada, Ireland, Italy, Mexico and Spain.

The album's lead single, "Heart Attack" peaked at number ten on the Billboard Hot 100, marking Lovato's third US top-ten single, and has been certified 5× platinum by the RIAA. The second single "Made in the USA" peaked at number 80 and was certified gold, while later singles "Neon Lights" and "Really Don't Care" both reached the top 40 peaking at 36 and 26, respectively, and both have been certified 2× platinum by RIAA. Lovato supported the album in two concert tours: The Neon Lights Tour in early 2014 and the Demi World Tour between late 2014 and early 2015.

== Production ==
In April 2012, Lovato began writing songs for her fourth studio album, following the commercial success of her third studio album Unbroken (2011). The album was recorded during Lovato's appearance as a mentor during the second season of The X Factor. Lovato chose the title of the album Demi, because it was her first album intended for a more mainstream audience, and those who did not know her music. Lovato also explained a "sequel" of the song "Skyscraper" (2011) is included. After the album was released, it was revealed that "Warrior" was intended to be a sequel of "Skyscraper". She stated, "I'm incredibly proud of this album" and "It's better than anything I have ever done! I experimented with a variety of different sounds and poured my heart into writing these songs. I'm so excited for everyone to finally get the chance to hear them!"

On May 6, 2013, Lovato asked her Twitter followers to "unlock" the entire album by putting song titles in hashtags. A special website lovaticsspeeduptime.com was launched, displaying all the songs next to a clock that would turn as tweets would be sent. Once a song became a trending topic, its YouTube video was made available on VEVO. All the songs were unlocked within four hours. An iBooks-exclusive e-book titled Demi: The Book was released on June 11, 2013. The book gives fans behind-the-scenes access to the singer, including never-before-seen footage and interviews. In one clip, she says that being honest and open is not only the message she is sending her fans in the book but also on her album. She said, "This album I've had enough time to really reflect on personal experiences and look back at my life after having overcome a bunch of things. I've been more aware of myself; therefore, when you listen to the album, you can really tell in the lyrics and in the emotion and everything I worked really, really hard on this album, and hopefully you'll be able to hear that."

== Composition ==
"I always want to make positive music. Obviously I'm gonna have my songs about heartbreak and break-ups, but with this album... I get sick of listening to the radio and hearing only music that's talking about partying and drinking and getting high. That's not what I do. It's not what I stand for."

— Lovato on the lyricism she wanted to convey with Demi.

Lovato described Demi as "good old American pop music", which was deeply influenced by her breakout single "Give Your Heart a Break" and she felt the "super catchy" lyrics as well as the beat of the song resonated with fans, which she wanted to further explore on the album. According to Lovato, her previous album Unbroken contained songs that she got sick of "a lot faster", so she wanted to "have songs that excited" her on Demi. Musical genres on the album range from pop rock to synthpop and bubblegum pop. Apart from "catchy songs" such as the mid-tempo track "Without the Love", "emotional songs" are also included on Demi. This is demonstrated on "Shouldn't Come Back" and "Warrior", which in 2013 Lovato called are too personal to perform live, comparing them to a song from Unbroken entitled "For the Love of a Daughter".

Billboard states that "Warrior" has Lovato declaring herself "a phoenix that has risen from all-too-public ashes", with emotional lyrics such as: "I've got shame, I've got scars, that I will never show/I'm a survivor, in more ways than you'll know". Speaking of "Warrior", the singer stated: "That song was probably the hardest and easiest song to write on the album. I was writing about personal experiences, and it's the type of song where you can't fit all of it into one song". The theme of Americanism on the album is evident on the track "Made in the USA", a patriotic love song inspired by "American love stories" in the 1930s. The song incorporates pop, rock, and country. Stripped down piano ballads on Demi includes, "In Case", which contains lyrics about heartbreak and "Nightingale". The upbeat songs "Really Don't Care" and "Something That We're Not" are produced to suit Lovato's "overpowering pipes".

In June 2013, Lovato stated: "My life has changed so much. I am vulnerable and honest in this record, the way I've always wanted to be. I was ready to come out of the darkness". She referred to the writing process for the album as "therapeutic", further stating: "It helped me get rid of my demons, I am a warrior now. I've been through so much in the past years, it was hard to find the courage to get out of it and write about it, I was afraid no one would understand my message. I spent so much time trying to figure out what the right thing to do was, that I got distracted along the way by fun and temptations and that's why I ended up in rehab at 18."

== Critical reception ==
Professional ratings
Aggregate scores
Source	Rating
Metacritic	64/100
Review scores
Source	Rating
AllMusic	3/5 stars
Artistdirect	5/5 stars
Billboard	4/5 stars
Entertainment Weekly	C+
Rolling Stone	3/5 stars
HitFix	B−

The album received generally positive reviews from music critics. According to review aggregator Metacritic, the album has a score of 64 out of 100 based on 6 reviews. Jason Lipshutz from Billboard gave a positive review, saying that "the singer has a strong grip on her skills as a performer, but is still chiseling away at the formula that works best for her as an artist, and is unwittingly putting that self-discovery on display here." Jon Caramanica from The New York Times also gave a positive review, saying that it is "[an] often impressive fourth album." Stephen Thomas Erlewine from AllMusic gave a more mixed review, rating the album three stars out of five, saying that "Ultimately, this isn't an album of purpose, it's a collection of moments, and it has just enough good ones to solidify Demi Lovato's comeback." Jody Rosen from Rolling Stone awarded the album three stars out of five, saying that "It's predictable stuff—sassy songs, lovelorn songs, a couple of pop-psych pep talks—but Lovato is good company, and her voice has gustiness and character."

Melissa Maerz from Entertainment Weekly, however, gave the album a mixed review and graded it C+, saying that "it's too bad that her new album Demi, sounds like such a decisive return to teen pop. Transformed from an edgier young woman back into America's sweetheart." Marc Hirsh from The Boston Globe was also mixed, saying that "Demi sounds like Lovato's grasping for hits, when she used to sound like she was making music and having fun." Melinda Newman from HitFix gave the album a B−, commenting "The problem with Demi is that too much of the music here is so generic that it could be any teen queen delivering these tunes." However, she went on to conclude "For those who are looking for a largely uptempo album that fits squarely into much of the pop landscape on radio today, Demi will be a pleasing fit."

== Promotion ==
When discussing her plans for The Neon Lights Tour in December 2013, Lovato stated "I want it to be about girl empowerment, I want it to be a huge party." Its opening acts included girl groups Fifth Harmony and Little Mix, as well as Cher Lloyd on select dates. The tour covered 41 shows in total across North and South America, as well as Canada and Mexico, beginning in Vancouver on February 9, and closing on May 17 in Monterrey.

Not long after the closing of the Neon Lights Tour, Lovato announced her first world tour, entitled the Demi World Tour. The tour would bring new opening acts, Christina Perri and MKTO, as well as playing shows in bigger venues, such as the Staples Center. It would mark the first time one of Lovato's albums had spawned two separate concert tours. The 2014 dates consisted of 25 shows across North America and Canada, with world tour dates due for 2015. The tour began on September 6 in Baltimore, with the first leg concluding on October 27 at the Barclays Center in New York City. On November 28, 2014, Lovato announced shows in Australia and New Zealand, marking her first time performing in these countries. The leg consisted of five shows beginning April 17 in Brisbane, and ending on April 26 in Auckland. Lovato went on to complete the tour with her most extensive Asian tour to date, performing a total of six shows. The tour concluded on May 19 in Ho Chi Minh City to a crowd of 50,000.

== Commercial performance ==
The album debuted at number three on the US Billboard 200 with first-week sales of 110,000 copies, behind Vampire Weekend's Modern Vampires of the City and George Strait's Love Is Everything, thus becoming the highest selling opening week of Lovato's career. In the United Kingdom, the album debuted at number ten on the UK Albums Chart, with sales of 10,658 copies sold in its first week. With the debut, it became Lovato's first album to breach the Top 40 in the country. The album was certified Gold in the US on September 16, 2014.

== Singles ==
"Heart Attack" was released as the album's lead single on February 25, 2013. The song was written by Mitch Allan, Jason Evigan, Sean Douglas, Nikki Williams, Aaron Phillips and Lovato and produced by The Suspex. The song debuted at number 12 on the US Billboard Hot 100 chart, with first week sales of 215,000 copies, becoming a sales record for Lovato at the time. The song reached number 10 on the chart, becoming Lovato's third song to do so. The song also reached a peak at number 3 in the United Kingdom, her first single to reach the top ten in the country. The music video was filmed on March 14, 2013 and released on April 9, 2013. Lovato performed the song live on several shows, including The Ellen DeGeneres Show, Good Morning America and Jimmy Kimmel Live!. The song has since been certified 5× platinum in the United States, 2× platinum in Canada, as well as platinum in Denmark, New Zealand and Sweden, gold in Australia, Mexico and Ireland, and silver in the United Kingdom.

"Made in the USA" was released as the album's second single on July 16, 2013. Lovato performed the song live at several concerts including the 2013 edition of Wango Tango on May 11, 2013 and Good Morning America's Summer Concert Series on June 28. The music video was released on July 17, 2013. It peaked at number 80 on the US Billboard Hot 100 and was certified gold, and also managed to peak within the top 20 in Lebanon, as well at number 40 on the US Mainstream Top 40 and number 45 on the US Digital Songs charts.

"Neon Lights" was released as the album's third single on November 19, 2013. On September 29, 2013, Lovato announced the name of her concert tour, the Neon Lights Tour, and soon after that "Neon Lights" would become the third single from the album. The song, with its prominent EDM influences, covered new ground for Demi, who had been previously known for her pop ballad singles. The accompanying music video was released on November 21, 2013. In New Zealand, the song peaked at number 12 and was certified gold. It reached number 36 on the US Billboard Hot 100, peaking at this position for three non-consecutive weeks. It topped the US Hot Dance Club Songs and became Lovato's third top 10 single on the Mainstream Top 40, by reaching at number 7. It was certified 2× platinum in the United States.

"Really Don't Care", featuring British recording artist Cher Lloyd, was released as the fourth single from the album on May 20, 2014. The week before it was officially serviced to US radio, it charted at number 7 at Mainstream Top 40, being Lovato's fourth top 10 single on the chart. It later on peaked at number one on the Billboard Dance Club Songs. The song debuted on the US Billboard Hot 100 at number 98, and has peaked at number 26. Lovato performed the song on several occasions before its official release as a single. Once released in May 2014, Lovato performed the song on the Season 13 live final of American Idol, Good Morning America Summer Concert Series, Late Night with Seth Meyers, and the 2014 Teen Choice Awards. "Really Don't Care" was later certified 2× platinum in the United States.

== Track listing ==
Standard edition
No.	Title	Writer(s)	Producer(s)	Length
1.	"Heart Attack"	Demi Lovato; Mitch Allan; Jason Evigan; Sean Douglas; Nikki Williams; Aaron Phillips	The Suspex	3:30
2.	"Made in the USA"	Lovato; Jonas Jeberg; Evigan; Corey Chorus; Blair Perkins	Jeberg; Evigan^{[a]}	3:16
3.	"Without the Love"	Lovato; Matt Squire; Roy Battle; Freddy Wexler	Squire; Battleroy; David "DQ" Quiñones^{[b]}	3:55
4.	"Neon Lights"	Lovato; Mario Marchetti; Tiffany Vartanyan; Ryan Tedder; Noel Zancanella	Tedder; Zancanella	3:53
5.	"Two Pieces"	Olivia Waithe; Allan; Evigan	The Suspex	4:25
6.	"Nightingale"	Lovato; Anne Preven; Matt Rad; Felicia Barton	Rad; Preven^{[b]}	3:36
7.	"In Case"	Emanuel Kiriakou; Priscilla Hamilton	Kiriakou	3:34
8.	"Really Don't Care" (featuring Cher Lloyd)	Lovato; Carl Falk; Rami Yacoub; Savan Kotecha; Cher Lloyd	Falk; Yacoub	3:21
9.	"Fire Starter"	Jarrad "Jaz" Rogers; Lindy Robbins; Julia Michaels	Rogers; Quiñones^{[b]}	3:24
10.	"Something That We're Not"	Lovato; Kotecha; Kiriakou; Andrew Goldstein	Kiriakou; Goldstein	3:17
11.	"Never Been Hurt"	Lovato; Alexandra Tamposi; Stefan Johnson; Jordan K. Johnson; Marcus Lomax; Jason Evigan	Evigan; The Monsters and the Strangerz	3:56
12.	"Shouldn't Come Back"	Lovato; Yacoub; Falk; Kotecha	Yacoub; Falk	3:48
13.	"Warrior"	Lovato; Goldstein; Kiriakou; Robbins	Kiriakou; Goldstein	3:51
Total length:				47:48

Deluxe edition^{[c]}
No.	Title	Writer(s)	Producer(s)	Length
14.	"Up" (Olly Murs featuring Demi Lovato)	Wayne Hector; Maegan Cottone; Peter Wallevik; Daniel Davidsen; Mich Hansen	Wallevik; TommyD; Quiñones^{[b]}	3:44
15.	"I Hate You, Don't Leave Me"	Lovato; Bogart; Goldstein; Kiriakou	Kiriakou; Goldstein	3:33
16.	"Let It Go"	Robert Lopez; Kristen Anderson-Lopez	Kiriakou; Goldstein	3:45
17.	"Give Me Love" (Live)	Sheeran; Gosling; Leonard		4:56
18.	"Nightingale" (Live)	Lovato; Preven; Radosevich; Barton	Zonars	3:36
19.	"Neon Lights" (Live)	Lovato; Marchetti; Vartanyan; Tedder; Zancanella	Zonars	4:22
20.	"Really Don't Care" (Live)	Lovato; Falk; Yacoub; Kotecha; Lloyd	Zonars	3:31
Total length:				75:15

Notes

- ^{^[a]} signifies a vocal co-producer
- ^{^[b]} signifies a vocal producer
- ^{^[c]} This specific deluxe edition was released on December 2014. Several other regional deluxe versions of the album were released throughout 2013 and 2014, each featuring distinct track listings and bonus content.
- The United Kingdom and Irish versions of the album, both standard and 2014 deluxe, include the bonus tracks "Give Your Heart a Break" and "Skyscraper", taken from Lovato's third studio album, Unbroken.
- The Target edition includes the bonus track "I Hate You, Don't Leave Me".
- The Google Play edition includes the live recording of "Give Me Love".
- Japanese edition includes the Manhattan Clique Edit Remix of "Heart Attack".
- Japanese deluxe edition includes The Alias Radio Remix and Belanger Remix of "Heart Attack", as well as the bonus DVD featuring the music video of "Heart Attack", three episodes of "The Story of Demi" documentary and live recordings.
- Latin American deluxe edition includes "I Hate You, Don't Leave Me" and the live recordings of "Nightingale", "Neon Lights" and "Really Don't Care", as well as the bonus DVD with various music videos and live recordings.

== Personnel ==
Credits adapted from Demi.

Performers and musicians

- Demi Lovato – lead vocals
- Cher Lloyd – vocals (track 8)
- Felicia Barton – background vocals (track 6)
- Battleroy – keys (track 3)
- David Bukovinszky – cello (tracks 3, 12)
- Carl Falk – all instruments (tracks 8, 12), guitars (tracks 8, 12), background vocals (track 8)
- Livvi Franc – background vocals (track 5)
- Larry Goetz – guitars (track 3)
- Andrew Goldstein – piano (tracks 10, 13), guitar (track 10), keyboards (track 10)
- Corky James – banjo (track 2), guitar (track 2)
- Jonas Jeberg – all instruments (track 2)
- Mattias Johansson – violin (tracks 3, 12)
- Emanuel Kiriakou – piano (tracks 6, 10, 13), guitar (track 10), keyboards (track 10)
- Albin Nedler – background vocals (track 8)
- Chris Patrick – background vocals (track 8)
- Anton Patzner – viola (track 6), violin (track 6)
- Lewis Patzner – cello (track 6)
- Matt Rad – background vocals (track 6), piano (track 6), keyboards (track 6)
- Jarrad Rogers – piano (track 9), drums (track 9), bass (track 9), guitars (track 9)
- Jordan Sapp – additional guitars (track 12)
- Jamie Snell – guitars (track 9)
- Matt Squire – drums (track 3), keyboards (track 3), guitars (track 3)
- Ryan Tedder – instrumentation (track 4)
- Rami Yacoub – all instruments (tracks 8, 12), bass (tracks 8, 12)
- Noel Zancanella – instrumentation (track 4)

Production

- Mitch Allan – production (tracks 1, 5)
- Battleroy – production (track 3), programming (track 3)
- Mattias Bylund – strings arrangement (tracks 3, 12), strings recording (tracks 3, 12), strings editing (tracks 3, 12)
- Smith Carlson – engineering (track 4)
- Thomas Cullison – vocal engineering assistant (tracks 8, 12)
- Brendan Dekora – engineering (track 7)
- Jason Evigan – production (tracks 1, 5, 11), co-production (track 2), vocal production (track 11)
- Carl Falk – production (tracks 8, 12), programming (tracks 8, 12), vocal recording (tracks 8, 12)
- Chris Gehringer – mastering
- Serban Ghenea – mixing
- Larry Goetz – engineering (track 3)
- Andrew Goldstein – production (tracks 10, 13), programming (tracks 10, 13)
- John Hanes – engineered for mix
- Adam Harr – engineering assistant (track 6)
- Jonas Jeberg – production (track 2), programming (track 2)
- Micah Johnson – engineering assistant (track 4)
- Emanuel Kiriakou – production (tracks 7, 10, 13), string arrangements (track 7), programming (track 10)
- Jens Koerkemeier – engineering (track 7), digital editing (tracks 10, 13)
- Savan Kotecha – vocal recording (tracks 8, 12)
- Davis Meissner – engineering assistant (track 7)
- The Monsters and the Strangerz – production (track 11)
- Kyle Moorman – engineering (track 2)
- Albin Nedler – vocal editing (track 8)
- Chris Patrick – vocal editing (track 8)
- Anton Patzner – string arrangements (track 6)
- Anne Preven – vocal production (track 6)
- David "DQ" Quiñones – vocal production (tracks 3, 9)
- Matt Rad – production (track 6), engineering (track 6), drum programming (track 6), string arrangements (track 6)
- Jarrad Rogers – production (track 9), programming (track 9)
- Matt Squire – production (track 3), engineering (track 3), programming (track 3)
- Zach Steele – vocal engineering (tracks 8, 12)
- Ryan Tedder – production (track 4), programming (track 4)
- Pat Thrall – digital editing (tracks 10, 13)
- Steve Tippeconnic – engineering (track 3)
- Josh Wilbur – engineering (tracks 3, 9), vocal recording (track 9)
- Rami Yacoub – production (tracks 8, 12), programming (tracks 8, 12), vocal editing (tracks 8, 12), vocal recording (tracks 8, 12)
- Noel Zancanella – production (track 4), programming (track 4)

Design and management

- Eddie De La Garza – management
- Enny Joo – art direction, design
- Philymack – management
- Rankin – photography
- Dave Snow – creative direction
- Mio Vukovic – A&R
- Sarah Yeo – A&R coordination

== Charts ==
=== Weekly charts ===
Chart (2013–2015)	Peak position
Argentinian Albums Chart	4
Australian Albums Chart	14
Austrian Albums Chart	38
Belgian Albums Chart (Flanders)	19
Belgian Albums Chart (Wallonia)	53
Brazilian Albums Chart	1
Canadian Albums Chart	1
China Albums (Sino Chart)	13
Croatian Foreign Albums	5
Czech Albums Chart	26
Danish Albums (Hitlisten)	7
Dutch Albums Chart	17
Finnish Albums Chart	48
French Albums Chart	89
German Album Charts	39
Greek Albums Chart	12
Irish Albums Chart	5
Italian Albums Chart	4
Japanese Albums Chart	206
Mexican Albums Chart	2
New Zealand Albums Chart	7
Norwegian Albums Chart	4
Polish Albums Chart	45
Portuguese Albums Chart	15
Scottish Albums Chart	7
Spanish Albums Chart	3
Swedish Albums Chart	36
Swiss Albums Chart	36
Taiwanese Albums Chart	2
UK Albums Chart	10
Uruguayan Albums Chart	4
US Billboard 200	3

=== Year-end charts ===
Chart (2013)	Position
Argentine Yearly Albums Chart	51
Belgian Albums Chart (Flanders)	105
Italian Albums Chart	97
Mexican Albums Chart	53
US Billboard 200	94
Chart (2014)	Position
Brazilian Albums Chart	14

== Certifications ==
Region	Certification	Certified units/sales
Brazil (Pro-Música Brasil)	Gold	20,000^{*}
Brazil (Pro-Música Brasil) Digital	Gold	30,000^{*}
Brazil (Pro-Música Brasil) DVD Edition	Platinum	30,000^{*}
Brazil (Pro-Música Brasil) DVD Deluxe Edition	2× Platinum	60,000^{*}
Canada (Music Canada)	Gold	40,000^{^}
Denmark (IFPI Danmark)	Platinum	20,000^{‡}
Indonesia	Platinum	
Italy (FIMI)	Gold	25,000^{‡}
Malaysia	Platinum	
Mexico (AMPROFON)	Gold	30,000^{^}
New Zealand (RMNZ)	2× Platinum	30,000^{‡}
Norway (IFPI Norway)	Platinum	20,000^{‡}
Philippines	Gold	7,500
Singapore (RIAS)	Gold	5,000^{*}
Sweden (GLF)	Gold	20,000^{‡}
United Kingdom (BPI)	Gold	100,000^{‡}
United States (RIAA)	2× Platinum	2,000,000^{‡}
^{*} Sales figures based on certification alone.^{^} Shipments figures based on certification alone.^{‡} Sales+streaming figures based on certification alone.

== Release history ==
Country	Date	Format	Label
Australia	May 10, 2013	CD; digital download	Hollywood Records
New Zealand	May 10, 2013	CD; digital download	Hollywood Records
Netherlands	May 10, 2013	CD; digital download	Universal Music Group
Asia	May 10, 2013	CD; digital download	Universal Music Group
Switzerland	May 10, 2013	CD; digital download	Universal Music Group
Belgium	May 13, 2013	CD; digital download	Universal Music Group
Czech Republic	May 13, 2013	CD; digital download	Universal Music Group
France	May 13, 2013	CD; digital download	Universal Music Group
Italy	May 13, 2013	CD; digital download	Universal Music Group
Poland	May 13, 2013	CD; digital download	Universal Music Group
Portugal	May 13, 2013	CD; digital download	Universal Music Group
Turkey	May 13, 2013	CD; digital download	Universal Music Group
Spain	May 13, 2013	CD; digital download	Universal Music Group
Brazil	May 13, 2013	CD; digital download	Hollywood Records
Hong Kong	May 13, 2013	CD; digital download	Hollywood Records
Singapore	May 13, 2013	CD; digital download	Hollywood Records
Taiwan	May 13, 2013	CD; digital download	Hollywood Records
Middle East	May 13, 2013	CD; digital download	Hollywood Records
Canada	May 14, 2013	CD; digital download	Hollywood Records
United States	May 14, 2013	CD; digital download	Hollywood Records
Ireland	May 17, 2013	CD; digital download	Universal Music Group
United Kingdom	May 20, 2013	CD; digital download	Universal Music Group
Germany	May 30, 2013	CD; digital download	Universal Music Group
China	August 15, 2013	CD; digital download	Guangdong StarSing
Japan	August 28, 2013	CD (deluxe edition); DVD	Avex Trax
Mexico	April 15, 2014	CD (deluxe edition); DVD	Universal Music Group
Brazil	April 18, 2014	CD (deluxe edition); DVD	Universal Music Group
Brazil	December 1, 2014	CD; digital download (deluxe edition)	Universal Music Group
United Kingdom	December 1, 2014	CD; digital download (deluxe edition)	Universal Music Group
Italy	December 1, 2014	CD; digital download (deluxe edition)	Universal Music Group
Canada	December 1, 2014	CD; digital download (deluxe edition)	Universal Music Group
Poland	December 1, 2014	CD; digital download (deluxe edition)	Universal Music Group
Various	March 18, 2021	Vinyl	Hollywood Records

== See also ==
- List of 2013 albums
- List of number-one albums of 2013 (Canada)
- List of UK top-ten albums in 2013
