= Made in the USA (song) =

2013 single by Demi Lovato

Single by Demi Lovato

from the album Demi
- Written: 2011
- Released: July 16, 2013
- Studio: Larrabee Studios, California
- Genre: Country pop
- Length: 3:16
- Label: Hollywood
- Songwriters: Jonas Jeberg; Jason Evigan; Corey Chorus; Blair Perkins; Demi Lovato
- Producer: Jonas Jeberg

Demi Lovato singles chronology
| "Heart Attack" (2013) | "Made in the USA" (2013) | "Let It Go" (2013) |

Music video
- "Made in the USA" on YouTube

"Made in the USA" is a song by American singer Demi Lovato. It was released on July 16, 2013, as the second single from her fourth studio album, Demi (2013). Released around Independence Day, the song was written by Lovato, Jason Evigan, Corey Chorus, Blair Perkins, and Jonas Jeberg and produced by Jeberg. "Made in the USA" is a midtempo country pop song that celebrates an everlasting American romantic relationship. The song peaked at number 80 on the Billboard Hot 100 and peaked within the top 20 in Lebanon. It has sold 312,000 copies and received generally positive reviews from music critics.

== Background and composition ==
"Made in the USA" is an midtempo country pop song with a running length of three minutes and sixteen seconds. The patriotic love song was composed by Corey Chorus, Lovato, Jason Evigan, Jonas Jeberg and Blair Perkins. It was written in 2011, originally intended for R&B artist Blair Perkins, though after producer Mio Vukovic heard it, he knew it was "meant" for Lovato. Songwriter and producer Jason Evigan told MTV News that the song was "Demi-fied" in response, though still contains an "R&B feel", explaining: "[Now] it's got like a country vibe mixed with this R&B feel, which makes it kind of pop country thing." Lovato reacted to the track instantly, and made a few changes to it. Lyrically, "Made in the USA" is inspired by "American romantic love stories" in the 1930s.

Upon the album's release, Billboard stated the song was "the right comparison of bubblegum fun and Lovato's overpowering pipes" and compared the track to the song "Party in the U.S.A." by fellow former Disney Channel star Miley Cyrus. Billboard also described the song as "an up-tempo, red-white-and-blue-tinged celebration of everlasting love" and stated that the song contained a "wistful guitar lick and some fierce romanting statements". Lovato's vocals in the song span two octaves, two notes, and a semitone, from the low note of E♭_{3} to the high note of A♭_{5}.

== Critical reception ==
"Made in the USA" received generally positive reviews from music critics. Billboard reacted positively to the song, praising it as a "grown-up version" of "Party in the U.S.A." by Miley Cyrus, noting its opening line which contains a reference to Chevrolet, describing it as "unusual" and "coy". Female First gave a generally positive review, saying that the song was not the best on the album but that it was "fun" and "upbeat" and praised its reference to Chevrolet as well as its "positive shout-outs" to America's coasts. Pop Spoken described the song as "slightly lackluster". iMedia Monkey also offered a mixed reaction, complimenting the song's "perfect balance of radio friendly choruses and interesting instrumentation"; however, they stated that the song was not "ground-breaking" and was generally "more of the same". Stephen Thomas Erlewine of AllMusic criticized the song for "copying" Cyrus's song.

Regarding the appearance of the song's video, MTV Style's Chrissy Mahlmeister noted that Lovato is getting in the "patriotic spirit", sporting an "all American" look which included a "crocheted white dress with a brown belt, denim jacket". Mahlmeister stated that Lovato "ditched her typically edgy, all-black ensembles" seen in Lovato's previous music video for "Heart Attack".

== Music video ==
The music video for "Made in the USA" released on July 17, 2013, on Vevo. It was directed by Ryan Pallotta and Lovato. The video is about a love story of a young American couple (portrayed by Aimee Teegarden and Dustin Milligan). At one night, the girl (Teegarden) goes with her friends to the carnival where she sees the boy (Milligan) for the first time, as the boy begins to dating with her along the way. One day, the boy leaves the girl behind, and it is revealed he is a soldier being deployed in the middle of the war. He promises to return, and meanwhile, the girl is left alone at home. The two attempt to stay in contact by writing letters to one another, and the girl anxiously awaits his correspondence. The climax of the story portrays a chaotic scene with the boy in a battlefield, shots ringing all around him. Simultaneously, the girl begins to shut herself in her room, worried about her boyfriend, and it seems as if he will die. In the end, the boy returns home and reunites with the girl. After the release of the video, Lovato dedicated to the troops of US Army, as well as the people who lost their lives and for the country.

== Live performances ==
On May 11, 2013, Lovato performed "Made in the USA" for the first time at the 2013 edition of Wango Tango. On June 28, 2013, Lovato performed the song during her appearance at the Good Morning America concert series, sporting a similar outfit to what the singer was seen wearing in the single's music video behind-the-scenes sneak peek. On August 11, 2013, Lovato performed at the 2013 Teen Choice Awards with Nick Jonas as drummer. The song was also a part of Lovato's setlist for The Neon Lights Tour.

== Commercial performance ==
"Made in the USA" made its peak number 80 on the US Billboard Hot 100, selling 312,000 copies overall.

== Awards and nominations ==
| Year | Award | Category | Work | Result | Ref. |
|---|---|---|---|---|---|
| 2014 | Radio Disney Music Awards | Favorite Roadtrip Song | "Made in the USA" | Won | |
| 2015 | Vevo Certified Awards | 100 Million Views | "Made in the USA" | Won | |

== Credits and personnel ==
Credits were adapted from Demi album liner notes.

=== Recording ===
- Recorded at Larrabee Studios, California.
- Mixed at MixStar Studios, Virginia Beach, Virginia.
- Mastered at Sterling Sound, New York City.

=== Personnel ===
- Demi Lovato – lead vocals, songwriter, drums
- Jonas Jeberg – songwriter, producer, instruments, vocal producer, programming
- Jason Evigan – songwriter, vocal co-producer
- Corey Chorus – songwriter
- Blair Perkins – songwriter, vocal producer
- Corky James – guitar, banjo, piano
- Kyle Moorman – engineer
- Serban Ghenea – mixer
- John Hanes – mix engineer
- Chris Gehringer – mastering

== Charts ==
Weekly chart performance
| Chart (2013) | Peak position |
|---|---|
| Belgium (Ultratip Bubbling Under Flanders) | 17 |
| European Hot 100 Singles (Billboard) | 87 |
| Ireland (IRMA) | 50 |
| Italy (FIMI) | 93 |
| Lebanon (Lebanese Top 20) | 20 |
| Scotland (Official Charts Company) | 61 |
| Slovakia Airplay (ČNS IFPI) | 62 |
| UK Singles (OCC) | 89 |
| US Billboard Hot 100 | 80 |
| US Pop Airplay (Billboard) | 40 |

== Certifications ==
Certifications and sales
| Region | Certification | Certified units/sales |
|---|---|---|
| Brazil (Pro-Música Brasil) | Gold | 30,000^{‡} |
| United States (RIAA) | Gold | 500,000^{‡} |
^{‡} Sales+streaming figures based on certification alone.

== Release history ==
Release dates and formats
| Country | Date | Format |
|---|---|---|
| United States | July 16, 2013 | Contemporary hit radio |
| Germany | September 27, 2013 | Digital download |
| New Zealand | September 27, 2013 | Digital download |
