= List of awards and nominations received by Demi Lovato =

Demi Lovato awards and nominations
- Lovato at the 2018 Billboard Music Awards
Awards and nominations
Award	Wins	Nominations
American Music Awards	0	1
Billboard Music Awards	0	4
Brit Awards	0	3
Grammy Awards	0	2
MTV Europe Music Awards	0	4
MTV Video Music Awards	1	15

Totals (Note: Certain award groups do not simply award one winner. They acknowledge several different recipients, have runners-up, and have third place. Since this is a specific recognition and is different from losing an award, runner-up mentions are considered wins in this award tally. For simplification and to avoid errors, each award in this list has been presumed to have had a prior nomination.)
- Wins: 62
- Nominations: 222

The American singer, songwriter, and actress Demi Lovato has won numerous awards throughout her career. She rose to prominence for her role as Mitchie Torres in the musical television movie Camp Rock (2008), and starred in the teen sitcom Sonny with a Chance (2009–2011), which garnered her an ALMA Award and a Teen Choice Award. VH1 named her one of the Greatest Kid Stars' Of All Time. Lovato was a judge and mentor for the second and third seasons of The X Factor (2012–2013), breaking the Guinness World Record by becoming the Youngest X Factor Judge in the history of the show.

Lovato's second studio album, Here We Go Again (2009), topped the US Billboard 200 chart. In 2011, Lovato released her third studio album, Unbroken, spawned the single "Skyscraper", which earned her the MTV Video Music Award for Best Video with a Message. At the 2011 Teen Choice Awards, Lovato was honored with an Acuvue Inspire Award; with 14 wins, she is the eight-most awarded solo artist in the awards' history. Her fourth studio album, Demi, was released in 2013. Its lead single, "Heart Attack", was an international hit and received the Canadian iHeartRadio MuchMusic Video Award for Best International Artist Video. At the 40th People's Choice Awards, Lovato won two awards, including Favorite Female Artist, in total she has five wins at this award. Confident (2015), her fifth studio album, was nominated for Best Pop Vocal Album at the 59th Annual Grammy Awards. In 2015, Lovato was awarded the Rulebreaker Award at the Billboard Women in Music event. In 2017, Lovato released her sixth studio album, Tell Me You Love Me, and was listed as one of 100 most influential people by Time. That year, Lovato released the single "Échame la Culpa", which won Song of the Year at the Latin American Music Awards. The following year, Lovato won the Kids' Choice Award for Favorite Female Singer and was nominated for an American Music Award and three Billboard Music Awards, including Top Female Artist. The song "Solo" received two nominations at the Brit Awards 2019, including British Single of the Year. In 2019, Lovato was nominated for Best Pop Duo/Group Performance at the 61st Annual Grammy Awards for the song "Fall in Line" with Christina Aguilera.

Lovato has also received various awards for her activism in protecting the rights of the LGBT community and for her work on mental health advocacy; she was honored with the GLAAD Vanguard Award at the 27th GLAAD Media Awards, and won Celebrity Of The Year at the British LGBT Awards. Billboard named her one of the most successful artist of 2010s decade.

== Major associations ==
=== Grammy Awards ===
Year	Recipients	Category	Result	Ref.
2017	Confident	Best Pop Vocal Album	Nominated	
2019	"Fall In Line" (with Christina Aguilera)	Best Pop Duo/Group Performance	Nominated	

== Other Associations ==
Award	Year (Note: Indicates the year of ceremony. Each year is linked to the article about the awards held that year, wherever possible.)	Recipients	Category	Result	Ref.
ALMA Awards	2009	Lovato	Best of the Year in Music	Nominated	
ALMA Awards	2011	Sonny With A Chance	Favorite TV Actress – Leading Role in a Comedy	Won	
ALMA Awards	2012	Lovato	Favorite Female Music Artist	Nominated	
American Music Awards	2018	Lovato	Favorite Social Artist	Nominated	
ARIA Music Awards	2021	"What Other People Say" (with Sam Fischer)	Single of the Year	Nominated	
ASCAP Pop Music Awards	2016	"Cool for the Summer"	Most Performed Songs (Note: Awards and nominations Lovato has received as songwriter.)	Won	
ASCAP Pop Music Awards	2018	"No Promises"	Winning Songs	Won	
ASCAP Pop Music Awards	2018	"Sorry Not Sorry"	Winning Songs	Won	
ASCAP Pop Music Awards	2019	"Sorry Not Sorry"	Winning Songs	Won	
Billboard Latin Music Awards	2019	"Échame la Culpa" (with Luis Fonsi)	Latin Pop Song of the Year	Nominated	
Billboard Latin Music Awards	2019	Lovato	Crossover Artist of the Year	Nominated	
Billboard.com Mid-Year Music Awards	2014	The Neon Lights Tour	Best Tour	Runner-up	
Billboard.com Mid-Year Music Awards	2015	Lovato's Next Album	Most Anticipated Music Release of 2015's Second Half	Runner-up	
Billboard Music Awards	2016	Lovato	Top Social Media Artist	Nominated	
Billboard Music Awards	2018	Lovato	Top Social Media Artist	Nominated	
Billboard Music Awards	2018	Lovato	Top Female Artist	Nominated	
Billboard Music Awards	2018	"No Promises" (with Cheat Codes)	Top Dance/Electronic Song	Nominated	
Billboard Touring Awards	2012	Lovato/Hallmark	Concert Marketing & Promotion Award	Won	
Billboard Women in Music	2015	Lovato	Rulebreaker Award	Won	
Bravo Otto	2014	Lovato	Female Artist of the Year	Nominated	
Brent Shapiro Foundation	2017	Lovato	Spirit of Sobriety Award	Won	
BRIT Awards	2016	"Up" (with Olly Murs)	British Single of the Year	Nominated	
BRIT Awards	2019	"Solo" (with Clean Bandit)	British Single of the Year	Nominated	
BRIT Awards	2019	"Solo" (with Clean Bandit)	British Video of the Year	Nominated	
British LGBT Awards	2018	Lovato	LGBT+ Celebrity	Nominated	
British LGBT Awards	2019	Lovato	LGBT+ Music Artists	Nominated	
British LGBT Awards	2021	Lovato	Celebrity Of The Year	Won	
Do Something Awards	2011	Sonny with a Chance	TV Star	Won	
Do Something Awards	2011	"Make a Wave"	Charity Song	Won	
GLAAD Media Awards	2016	Lovato	GLAAD Vanguard Award	Won	
GLAAD Media Awards	2022	Dancing with the Devil... the Art of Starting Over	Outstanding Music Artist	Nominated	
GLAAD Media Awards	2023	Holy Fvck	Outstanding Music Artist	Nominated	
Glamour Awards	2014	The X Factor (U.S.)	TV Personality	Nominated	
Glamour Awards	2016	Lovato	International Musician/Solo Artist	Nominated	
Glamour Awards	2017	Lovato	International Music Act	Nominated	
Guild of Music Supervisors Awards	2022	"Anyone"	Best Song Written and/or Recorded for Television	Nominated	
Heat Latin Music Awards	2019	"Échame la Culpa" (with Luis Fonsi)	Best Video	Nominated	
Hollywood Music in Media Awards	2017	"Confident" (Note: A song from the Leap soundtracks.)	Original Song – Animated Film	Won	
iHeartRadio MMVAs (Note: Previously known as MuchMusic Video Awards (1996–2015).)	2013	"Heart Attack"	International Video of the Year – Artist	Won	
iHeartRadio MMVAs	2013	Lovato	Your Fave International Artist	Nominated	
iHeartRadio Music Awards	2014	Lovatics	Best Fan Army	Nominated	
iHeartRadio Music Awards	2016	"Hello" (Adele song)	Best Cover Song	Nominated	
iHeartRadio Music Awards	2016	Lovatics	Best Fan Army	Nominated	
iHeartRadio Music Awards	2017	Lovatics	Best Fan Army	Nominated	
iHeartRadio Music Awards	2018	Lovatics	Best Fan Army	Nominated	
iHeartRadio Music Awards	2018	Batman (Note: Batman is Demi Lovato's dog.)	Cutest Musician's Pet	Nominated	
iHeartRadio Music Awards	2018	"No Promises" (with Cheat Codes)	Dance Song of the Year	Nominated	
iHeartRadio Music Awards	2018	"Sorry Not Sorry"	Best Music Video	Nominated	
iHeartRadio Music Awards	2019	"Échame la Culpa" (with Luis Fonsi)	Latin Song of the Year	Nominated	
iHeartRadio Music Awards	2022	"I'm Still Standing" (Elton John song)	Best Cover Song	Nominated	
iHeartRadio Music Awards	2025	Child Star	Favorite On Screen	Nominated	
iHeartRadio Titanium Award (Note: The iHeartRadio Titanium Award is an award which recognized artists who have reached a threshold of a billion Total Audience Spins.)	2019	"Sorry Not Sorry"	1 Billion Total Audience Spins on iHeartRadio Stations	Won	
InStyle Awards	2017	Lovato	Advocate of the Year	Won	
Latin American Music Awards	2015	Lovato	Favorite Crossover Artist	Won	
Latin American Music Awards	2018	Lovato	Favorite Crossover Artist	Nominated	
Latin American Music Awards	2018	"Échame la Culpa" (with Luis Fonsi)	Song of the Year	Won	
Latin American Music Awards	2018	"Échame la Culpa" (with Luis Fonsi)	Favorite Pop Song	Nominated	
Lo Nuestro Awards	2025	"Chula" (with Grupo Firme)	Crossover Collaboration of the Year	Nominated	
Lunas del Auditorio	2014	Lovato	Pop in Foreign Language	Nominated	
Lunas del Auditorio	2017	Lovato	Pop in Foreign Language	Nominated	
Meus Prêmios Nick (Note: Meus Prêmios Nick Award Brazilian version of Nickelodeon Kids' Choice Awards.)	2013	Lovato	Favorite International Artist	Won	
Meus Prêmios Nick	2014	Lovato	Favorite International Artist	Won	
Meus Prêmios Nick	2014	Lovatics	Favorite Fans	Nominated	
Meus Prêmios Nick	2015	Lovato	Favorite International Artist	Nominated	
Meus Prêmios Nick	2016	Lovato	Favorite International Artist	Nominated	
Meus Prêmios Nick	2017	Lovato	International Show of the Year in Brazil	Nominated	
Meus Prêmios Nick	2017	"Sorry Not Sorry"	Favorite International Music Video	Won	
MTV Europe Music Awards	2017	Lovato	Best Pop	Nominated	
MTV Europe Music Awards	2020	"I'm Ready" (with Sam Smith)	Best Collaboration	Nominated	
MTV Europe Music Awards	2020	"I Love Me"	Video for Good	Nominated	
MTV Europe Music Awards	2021	"Dancing with the Devil"	Video for Good	Nominated	
MTV Italian Music Awards	2015	Lovato	Best Twitstar	Won	
MTV Italian Music Awards	2015	Lovato	Artist Saga	Nominated	
MTV MIAW Awards	2014	Lovato	Global Superstar Instagram	Nominated	
MTV MIAW Awards	2016	"Irresistible" (with Fall Out Boy)	Collaboration of the Year	Won	
MTV MIAW Awards	2018	"Échame la Culpa" (with Luis Fonsi)	Hit of the Year	Nominated	
MTV MIAW Awards	2018	Lovato	Global Instagrammer	Nominated	
MTV MIAW Awards	2018	Lovatics	Fandom 2018	Nominated	
MTV MIAW Awards	2018	"Sorry Not Sorry"	Global Hit of the Year	Nominated	
MTV MIAW Awards Brazil	2018	Batman	Pet of the Year	Nominated	
MTV MIAW Awards Brazil	2018	Lovatics	Fandom of the Year	Nominated	
MTV MIAW Awards Brazil	2020	"I Love Me"	Global Hit	Nominated	
MTV MIAW Awards Brazil	2020	"I'm Ready" (with Sam Smith)	International Collaboration	Nominated	
MTV Movie & TV Awards	2017	"Wheel of Musical Impressions with Demi Lovato"	Trending	Nominated	
MTV Movie & TV Awards	2018	Demi Lovato: Simply Complicated	Best Music Documentary	Nominated	
MTV Movie & TV Awards	2021	Demi Lovato: Dancing with the Devil	Best Music Documentary	Nominated	
MTV Movie & TV Awards	2023	"Still Alive"	Best Song	Nominated	
MTV Video Music Awards	2012	"Skyscraper"	Best Video with a Message	Won	
MTV Video Music Awards	2013	"Heart Attack"	Best Female Video	Nominated	
MTV Video Music Awards	2014	"Really Don't Care" (with Cher Lloyd)	Best Lyric Video	Nominated	
MTV Video Music Awards	2015	"Cool For The Summer"	Song of Summer	Nominated	
MTV Video Music Awards	2016	"Irresistible" (with Fall Out Boy)	Best Rock Video	Nominated	
MTV Video Music Awards	2017	"Sorry Not Sorry"	Song of Summer	Nominated	
MTV Video Music Awards	2018	"Sorry Not Sorry"	Best Pop	Nominated	
MTV Video Music Awards	2018	"Échame la Culpa" (with Luis Fonsi)	Best Latin	Nominated	
MTV Video Music Awards	2019	"Solo" (with Clean Bandit)	Best Dance	Nominated	
MTV Video Music Awards	2020	"I Love Me"	Best Visual Effects	Nominated	
MTV Video Music Awards	2020	"I Love Me"	Video for Good	Nominated	
MTV Video Music Awards	2021	"Dancing with the Devil"	Video for Good	Nominated	
MTV Video Music Awards	2023	"Swine"	Video for Good	Nominated	
MTV Video Music Awards	2023	"Swine"	Best Pop	Nominated	
MTV Video Music Awards	2025	"Fast"	Song of Summer	Nominated	
MTV Video Music Brazil	2012	Lovato	International Artist	Nominated	
Myx Music Awards	2014	"Heart Attack"	Favorite International Video	Nominated	
Nickelodeon Argentina Kids' Choice Awards	2018	"Échame la Culpa" (with Luis Fonsi)	Favorite Hit	Nominated	
Nickelodeon Australian Kids' Choice Awards	2009	Lovato	Favorite International Singer	Nominated	
Nickelodeon Colombia Kids' Choice Awards	2016	Lovato	Favorite International Artist or Group	Nominated	
Nickelodeon Kids' Choice Awards	2018	Lovato	Favorite Female Artist	Won	
Nickelodeon Mexico Kids' Choice Awards	2014	Lovato	Favorite International Artist or Group	Nominated	
Nickelodeon Mexico Kids' Choice Awards	2018	"Échame la Culpa" (with Luis Fonsi)	Favorite Feat	Nominated	
O Music Awards	2011	Lovato	Best Artist with a Cameraphone	Won	
O Music Awards	2011	Lovatics	Fan Army FTW	Nominated	
O Music Awards	2013	Lovatics	Fan Army FTW	Nominated	
Open Mind Gala	2017	Lovato	Artistic Award of Courage	Won	
People's Choice Awards	2010	Lovato	Favorite Breakout Artist	Nominated	
People's Choice Awards	2011	Grey's Anatomy	Favorite TV Guest Star	Won	
People's Choice Awards	2012	Lovato	Favorite Pop Artist	Won	
People's Choice Awards	2013	Lovato	Favorite Pop Artist	Nominated	
People's Choice Awards	2013	The X Factor (U.S.)	Favorite Celebrity Judge	Won	
People's Choice Awards	2013	Lovatics	Favorite Music Fan Following	Nominated	
People's Choice Awards	2014	Lovatics	Favorite Music Fan Following	Won	
People's Choice Awards	2014	"Heart Attack"	Favorite Music Video	Nominated	
People's Choice Awards	2014	Lovato	Favorite Female Artist	Won	
People's Choice Awards	2014	Lovato	Favorite Pop Artist	Nominated	
People's Choice Awards	2016	Lovato	Favorite Pop Artist	Nominated	
People's Choice Awards	2016	Lovato	Favorite Female Artist	Nominated	
People's Choice Awards	2021	Demi Lovato: Dancing with the Devil	The Pop Special of 2021	Nominated	
Premios Juventud	2021	Lovato	Helping Your Fans	Nominated	
Premios People en Español	2013	Lovato	Best Female Singer	Nominated	
Radio Disney Music Awards	2014	Lovato	Best Female Artist	Won	
Radio Disney Music Awards	2014	"Made in the USA"	Favorite Roadtrip Song	Won	
Radio Disney Music Awards	2015	"Really Don't Care" (with Cher Lloyd)	Best Breakup Song	Nominated	
Radio Disney Music Awards	2015	"Really Don't Care" (with Cher Lloyd)	Best Collaboration	Won	
Radio Disney Music Awards	2016	"Confident"	Best Anthem	Nominated	
Radio Disney Music Awards	2017	"Future Now Tour" (with Nick Jonas)	Favorite Tour	Nominated	
Radio Disney Music Awards	2018	"No Promises" (with Cheat Codes)	Best Collaboration	Nominated	
Radio Disney Music Awards	2018	"Sorry Not Sorry"	Best Song To Lip Sync To	Nominated	
Realscreen Awards	2019	Demi Lovato: Simply Complicated	Non-Fiction: Arts & Culture (Note: Awards and nominations Lovato has received as executive producer.)	Nominated	
SAMHSA	2013	Lovato	Honoured	Won	
Shorty Awards	2012	Lovato	Best Singer in Social Media	Won	
Shorty Awards	2012	Lovato	Music	Nominated	
Shorty Awards	2012	Lovato	Actress	Nominated	
Shorty Awards	2012	Lovato	Celebrity	Nominated	
Shorty Awards	2013	Lovato	Music	Won	
Shorty Awards	2015	Lovato	Singer	Nominated	
Shorty Awards	2016	Lovato	Singer	Nominated	
Shorty Awards	2020	Lovato	Celebrity	Nominated	
Spotify Plaques	2022	"Sorry Not Sorry"	One Billion Streams Award	Won	
Spotify Plaques	2023	"Solo" (with Clean Bandit)	One Billion Streams Award	Won	
Spotify Plaques	2025	"Échame la Culpa" (with Luis Fonsi)	One Billion Streams Award	Won	
Swiss Music Awards	2019	"Échame la Culpa" (with Luis Fonsi)	Best Hit - International	Won	
Teen Choice Awards	2009	Sonny with a Chance	Choice TV: Female Breakout Star	Won	
Teen Choice Awards	2009	Lovato	Choice Red Carpet Icon: Female	Nominated	
Teen Choice Awards	2009	Princess Protection Program	Choice Summer TV Star – Female	Nominated	
Teen Choice Awards	2009	"Summer Tour 2009" (with David Archuleta)	Choice Summer Tour	Won	
Teen Choice Awards	2010	"Catch Me"	Choice Love Song	Nominated	
Teen Choice Awards	2010	Here We Go Again	Album Pop	Nominated	
Teen Choice Awards	2010	Sonny with a Chance	Choice TV Actress – Comedy	Nominated	
Teen Choice Awards	2010	Lovato	Choice Breakout Star: Female	Nominated	
Teen Choice Awards	2010	"We'll Be a Dream" (with We the Kings)	Hook Up	Nominated	
Teen Choice Awards	2011	Sonny with a Chance	Choice TV Actress – Comedy	Nominated	
Teen Choice Awards	2011	Lovato	Choice Twit	Nominated	
Teen Choice Awards	2011	Lovato	Choice Summer Music Star – Female	Nominated	
Teen Choice Awards	2011	Lovato	Acuvue Inspire Award	Won	
Teen Choice Awards	2011	"Skyscraper"	Choice Summer Song	Won	
Teen Choice Awards	2012	"Give Your Heart a Break"	Choice Love Song	Nominated	
Teen Choice Awards	2012	"Give Your Heart a Break"	Choice Summer Song	Nominated	
Teen Choice Awards	2012	Lovato	Choice Twit	Won	
Teen Choice Awards	2012	Lovato	Choice Summer Female Artist	Won	
Teen Choice Awards	2013	"Heart Attack"	Choice Music Single: Female Artist	Won	
Teen Choice Awards	2013	Lovato	Choice Female Artist	Won	
Teen Choice Awards	2013	Lovato	Choice Female Hottie	Nominated	
Teen Choice Awards	2013	Lovato	Choice Style Icon	Won	
Teen Choice Awards	2013	Lovato	Choice Smile	Nominated	
Teen Choice Awards	2013	The X Factor (U.S.)	Choice TV: Female Personality	Won	
Teen Choice Awards	2014	Lovato	Choice Summer Female Artist	Won	
Teen Choice Awards	2014	Lovato	Choice Smile	Nominated	
Teen Choice Awards	2014	Lovato	Choice Twit	Nominated	
Teen Choice Awards	2014	Lovatics	Choice Fanatic Fans	Nominated	
Teen Choice Awards	2014	"Really Don't Care" (with Cher Lloyd)	Choice Summer Song	Won	
Teen Choice Awards	2014	"Really Don't Care" (with Cher Lloyd)	Choice Break-Up Song	Nominated	
Teen Choice Awards	2014	"Somebody To You" (with The Vamps)	Choice Love Song	Nominated	
Teen Choice Awards	2015	"Cool for the Summer"	Choice Summer Song	Nominated	
Teen Choice Awards	2015	Lovato	Choice Female Artist	Won	
Teen Choice Awards	2015	Lovato	Choice Summer Female Artist	Nominated	
Teen Choice Awards	2015	Lovatics	Choice Fandom	Nominated	
Teen Choice Awards	2016	"Confident"	Choice Song: Female Artist	Nominated	
Teen Choice Awards	2016	"Future Now Tour" (with Nick Jonas)	Choice Summer Tour	Nominated	
Teen Choice Awards	2016	"I Will Survive"	Choice Song from a Movie or TV Show	Nominated	
Teen Choice Awards	2016	Lovato	Choice Female Artist	Nominated	
Teen Choice Awards	2016	Lovato	Choice Female Hottie	Nominated	
Teen Choice Awards	2016	Lovato	Choice Summer Female Artist	Nominated	
Teen Choice Awards	2016	"Stone Cold"	Choice Break-Up Song	Nominated	
Teen Choice Awards	2016	"Without a Fight" (with Brad Paisley)	Choice Country Song	Won	
Teen Choice Awards	2017	"No Promises" (with Cheat Codes)	Choice Music Collaboration	Nominated	
Teen Choice Awards	2018	"Échame la Culpa" (with Luis Fonsi)	Choice Latin Song	Nominated	
Teen Choice Awards	2018	Lovato	Choice Female Artist	Nominated	
Teen Choice Awards	2018	Lovato	Choice Snapchatter	Nominated	
Teen Choice Awards	2018	"Solo" (with Clean Bandit)	Choice Electronic Song	Nominated	
Teen Choice Awards	2018	"Sorry Not Sorry"	Choice Song: Female Artist	Nominated	
Telehit Awards	2013	Demi	Best Female Pop Album	Nominated	
Telehit Awards	2015	Lovato	Best Female Artist	Nominated	
Telehit Awards	2017	Lovato	Best Female Artist	Won	
unite4:humanity	2014	Lovato	Young Luminary Awards	Won	
Victoria's Secret What Is Sexy Awards	2016	Lovato	Sexiest Songstress	Won	
Voice Awards	2012	Demi Lovato: Stay Strong	Documentary Category	Won	
Webby Awards	2016	Undercover Lyft with Demi Lovato	The YouTube Ad That Puts Stars In Your Eyes	Nominated	
World Music Awards	2014	Lovato	World's Best Female Artist	Nominated	
World Music Awards	2014	Lovato	World's Best Live Act	Nominated	
World Music Awards	2014	Lovato	World's Best Entertainer of the Year	Nominated	
World Music Awards	2014	"Heart Attack"	World's Best Video	Nominated	
World Music Awards	2014	"Heart Attack"	World's Best Song	Nominated	
World Music Awards	2014	Demi	World's Best Album	Nominated	
Young Artist Awards	2009	Camp Rock	Best Performance in a TV Movie – Leading Young Actress	Nominated	
Young Artist Awards	2010	Princess Protection Program	Best Performance in a TV Movie, Miniseries, or Special – Leading Young Actress	Nominated	
Young Hollywood Awards	2014	Lovato	Hottest Music Artist	Nominated	
Young Hollywood Awards	2014	"Really Don't Care" (with Cher Lloyd)	Song of the Summer/DJ Replay	Nominated	
YouTube Music Awards	2013	"Heart Attack"	Video of Year	Nominated	

== Other accolades ==
=== World records ===
Key
†	Indicates a now former world record holder

Name of publication, year the record was awarded, name of the record, and the name of the record holder
Publication	Year	World record	Record holder	Ref.
Guinness World Records	2014	Youngest X Factor Judge	Lovato	

=== Listicles ===
Name of publisher, name of listicle, year(s) listed, and placement result
Publisher	Listicle	Year(s)	Result	Ref.
Billboard	21 Under 21	2010	8th	
Billboard	21 Under 21	2011	7th	
Billboard	21 Under 21	2012	3rd	
Billboard	Billboard's Top Artists of the 2010s	2019	84th	
Billboard	Billboard's 500 Best Pop Songs	2023	495th ("Give Your Heart a Break")	
Billboard	Top Women Artists of the 21st Century	2025	52nd	
Forbes	30 Under 30	2016	Placed	
Rolling Stone	Rolling Stone's 50 Most Inspirational LGBTQ Songs of All Time	2023	32nd ("I'm Ready")	
Time	Time 100	2017	Placed	
VH1	100 Greatest Kid Stars' of All Time	2014	69th	
