= Demi Lovato =

American singer and actress (born 1992)

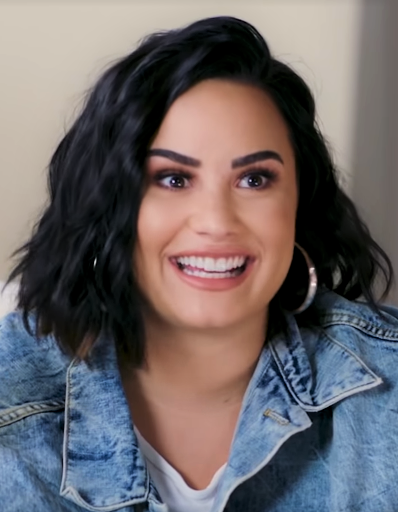
- Lovato in 2020
- Born: Demetria Devonne Lovato; August 20, 1992 (age 34); Albuquerque, New Mexico, U.S.
- Occupations: Singer; songwriter; actress
- Years active: 2002–present
- Works: Discography; songs recorded; videography; performances
- Spouse: Jordan Lutes (m. 2025)
- Relatives: Madison De La Garza (half-sister); Francisco Perea (great-great-great-grandfather)
- Awards: Full list
- Musical career
- Genre: Pop
- Instruments: Vocals; guitar; piano
- Labels: Hollywood; Island
- Website: demilovato.com

Signature
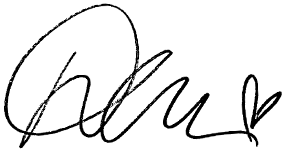

Demetria Devonne "Demi" Lovato (/ˈdɛmi ləˈvɑːtoʊ/ DEM-ee lə-VAH-toh; born August 20, 1992) is an American singer, songwriter, and actress. After appearing on the children's television series Barney & Friends (2002–2004), she (Note: Lovato uses both she/her and they/them pronouns. This article uses she/her for consistency.) starred in the Disney Channel short series As the Bell Rings (2007–2008), and as the titular character on the sitcom Sonny with a Chance (2009–2011). Lovato rose to prominence for playing Mitchie Torres in the musical television film Camp Rock (2008) and its sequel Camp Rock 2: The Final Jam (2010). The former film's soundtrack featured "This Is Me", her debut single with Joe Jonas, peaking at number nine on the US Billboard Hot 100.

After signing with Hollywood Records, Lovato released her pop rock debut album, Don't Forget (2008), which debuted at number two on the US Billboard 200. Its follow-up, Here We Go Again (2009), debuted at number one in the US. Her third and fourth studio albums, Unbroken (2011) and Demi (2013), delved into pop and R&B, debuted at numbers four and three in the US, and featured the US top-ten singles "Skyscraper" and "Heart Attack". Lovato's fifth and sixth albums included soul influences; Confident (2015) earned a Grammy Award nomination, while "Sorry Not Sorry" from Tell Me You Love Me (2017) reached number six. After a hiatus, Lovato released her seventh and eighth albums, Dancing with the Devil... the Art of Starting Over (2021) and the rock-influenced Holy Fvck (2022), peaking at numbers two and seven in the US. Her ninth album, It's Not That Deep, followed in 2025, debuting at number nine in the US.

In other work, Lovato judged the American series of The X Factor for two seasons (2012–2013), appeared on the musical comedy Glee (2013–2014) and the sitcom Will & Grace (2020), and hosted her self-titled talk show and the docuseries Unidentified with Demi Lovato (both 2021). She also starred in the comedy film Princess Protection Program (2009), the animated films Smurfs: The Lost Village (2017) and Charming (2018), the musical comedy Eurovision Song Contest: The Story of Fire Saga (2020), the co-directed documentary Child Star (2024), and the drama film Tow (2025).

Lovato has sold over 30 million records worldwide. Her accolades include an MTV Video Music Award, fourteen Teen Choice Awards, five People's Choice Awards, and a Guinness World Record; she was included on the Time 100 annual list in 2017. She co-founded the record label Safehouse Records with Nick Jonas in 2015 and has been active in social causes. Her struggles with an eating disorder, substance abuse, and self-harm led to her self-help memoir Staying Strong: 365 Days a Year (2013), and the documentaries Demi Lovato: Stay Strong (2012), Demi Lovato: Simply Complicated (2017), and Demi Lovato: Dancing with the Devil (2021).

== Early life and career beginnings ==
Demetria Devonne Lovato was born on August 20, 1992, in Albuquerque, New Mexico, to former Dallas Cowboys cheerleader Dianna De La Garza (née Lee Smith) and engineer and musician Patrick Martin Lovato. Lovato has an older full sister named Dallas, a younger maternal half-sister, actress Madison De La Garza, and an older paternal half-sister, Amber, whom Lovato first spoke to at age 20.

In mid-1994, shortly after Lovato's second birthday, her parents divorced. Her father was of Nuevomexicano descent, with mostly Spanish and Native American ancestors, and came from a family that had been living in New Mexico for generations; he also had distant Portuguese and Jewish ancestry. He was a descendant of American Civil War Union veteran Francisco Perea and Santa Fe de Nuevo México governor Francisco Xavier Chávez. Lovato had no interest in forging a relationship with Patrick after her parents divorced. Her mother is of Irish descent.

She has been vocal about her strained relationship with her father, calling him abusive and once stated, "He was mean, but he wanted to be a good person. And he wanted to have his family, and when my mom married my stepdad, he still had this huge heart where he said, 'I'm so glad that [he's] taking care of you and doing the job that I wish I could do.'" After Patrick died of cancer on June 22, 2013, Lovato said that he had been mentally ill, and she created the Lovato Treatment Scholarship Program in his honor.

Lovato was brought up in Dallas, Texas. She began playing the piano at age seven and guitar at 10, when she began dancing and acting classes. In 2002, Lovato began her acting career on the children's television series Barney & Friends, portraying the role of Angela. She appeared on Prison Break in 2006 and on Just Jordan the following year. Due to her acting career, Lovato was bullied and consequently requested homeschooling, through which she eventually received her high-school diploma.

== Career ==
=== 2007–2008: Breakthrough with Camp Rock and Don't Forget ===
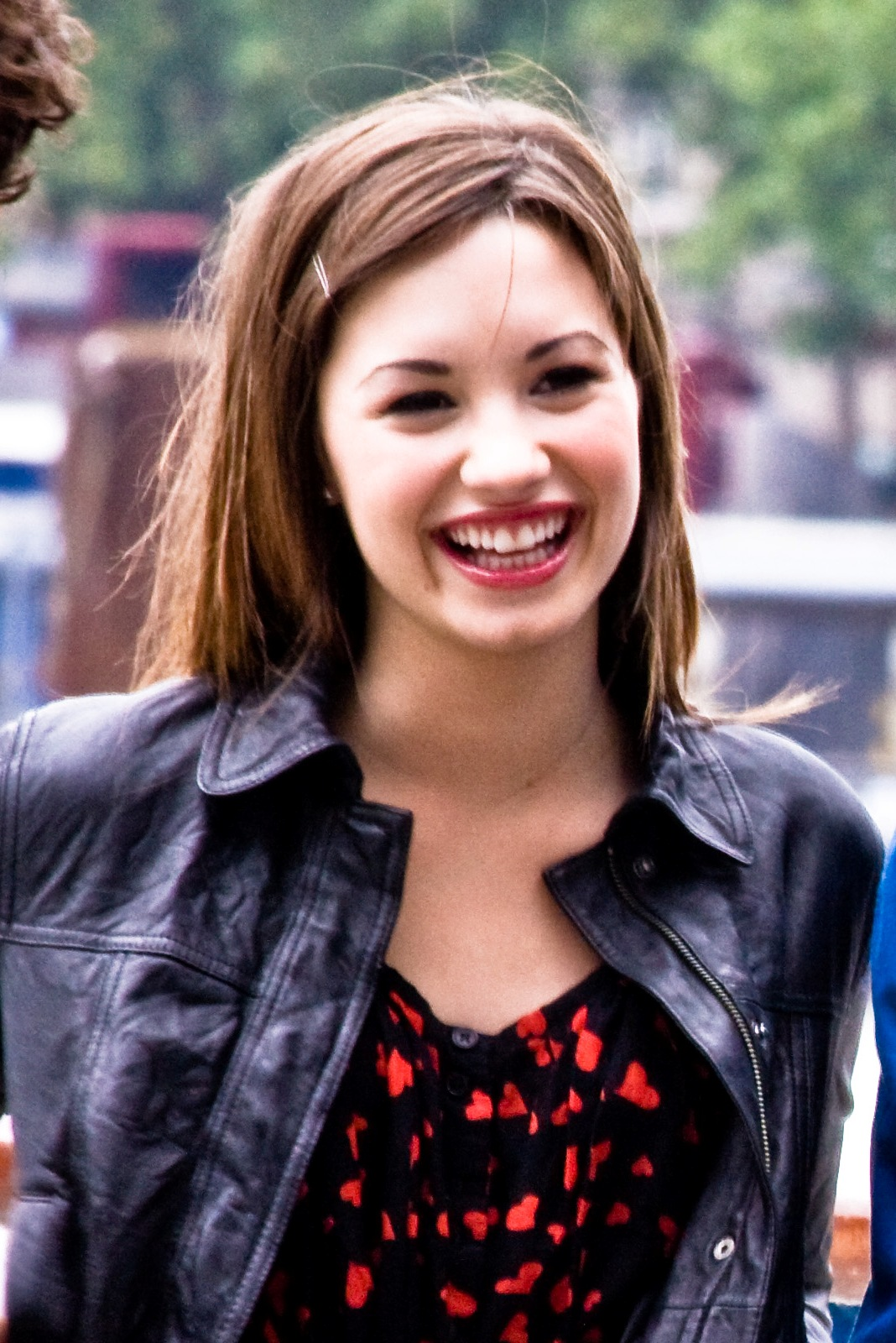
Lovato in London in September 2008

From 2007 to 2008, Lovato played Charlotte Adams on the Disney Channel short series As the Bell Rings. Lovato auditioned for the channel's television film Camp Rock and series Sonny with a Chance during 2007 and got both roles. Lovato played the lead character, aspiring singer Mitchie Torres, in Camp Rock. The film premiered on June 20, 2008, to 8.9 million viewers. Gillian Flynn of Entertainment Weekly wrote that Lovato's acting skills were underwhelming and that she has "the knee-jerk smile of someone who is often told she has a great smile". The film's soundtrack was released three days earlier; however, the music was considered less current than that of High School Musical. It debuted at number three on the US Billboard 200, with 188,000 units sold in its first week of release. Lovato sang four songs on the soundtrack, including "We Rock" and "This Is Me". The latter, Lovato's debut single, debuted at number 11 on the US Billboard Hot 100 and later peaked at number nine, marking her first entry on the chart. That summer, Lovato signed with Hollywood Records and began her Demi Live! Warm Up Tour before the release of her debut studio album, and appeared on the Jonas Brothers' Burnin' Up Tour.

Lovato's debut studio album, Don't Forget, released on September 23, 2008, was met with generally positive reviews from critics. Michael Slezak of Entertainment Weekly said, "Demi Lovato might satisfy her 'tween fans but she won't be winning any rockers over with Don't Forget". The album debuted at number two in the US, with first-week sales of 89,000 copies. Ten of its songs were co-written with the Jonas Brothers.

Don't Forget was certified Gold by the Recording Industry Association of America (RIAA) for US sales of over 500,000 units. Its lead single, "Get Back", was praised for its pop rock style and peaked at number 43 on the Billboard Hot 100, also selling over 560,000 copies in the United States. The album's second single, "La La Land", was cited for its strong rock elements and peaked at number 52 in the US, and cracked the top 40 in Ireland and the United Kingdom. The music video for the song was directed by Brendan Malloy and Tim Wheeler. The third single and title track, "Don't Forget", peaked at number 41 in the US.

=== 2009–2010: Sonny with a Chance and Here We Go Again ===
Lovato's Disney Channel sitcom Sonny with a Chance, in which she played Sonny Munroe, the newest cast member of the show-within-a-show So Random!, premiered on February 8. Robert Lloyd of the Los Angeles Times described Lovato's acting ability as "very good", comparing her favorably to Hannah Montana star Miley Cyrus. That June, Lovato starred as Rosie Gonzalez / Princess Rosalinda in the Disney Channel film Princess Protection Program, alongside Selena Gomez. The film, the fourth highest-rated Disney Channel original movie, premiered to 8.5 million viewers. For the film's soundtrack, the pair recorded the song "One and the Same", which was later released as a promotional single.

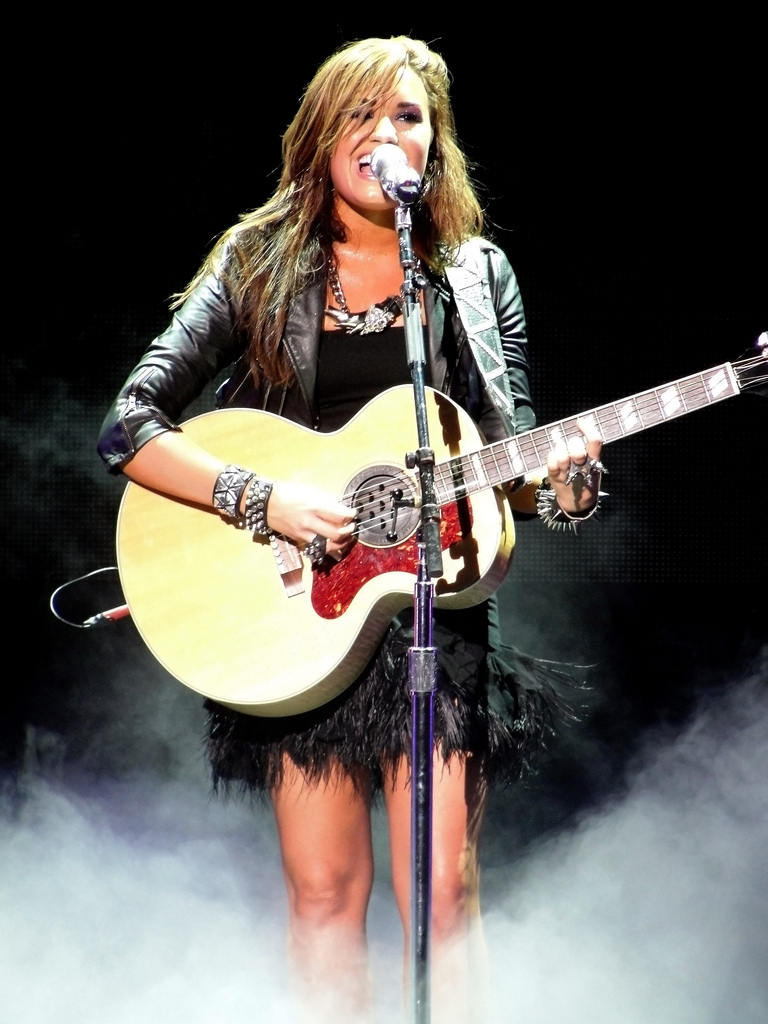
Lovato performing on the Jonas Brothers: Live in Concert tour in September 2010

Lovato's second studio album, Here We Go Again, was released on July 21, 2009; she described its acoustic style as similar to that of John Mayer. The album received favorable reviews from critics who appreciated its enjoyable pop-rock elements, echoing reviews of Don't Forget. Lovato's first number-one album, it debuted atop the Billboard 200 with first-week sales of 108,000 copies, and was later certified Gold. The album's lead single and title track, "Here We Go Again", debuted at number 59 on the Billboard Hot 100, and managed to peak at number 15, becoming Lovato's highest-charting solo single to that point. The song also peaked at number 68 on the Canadian Hot 100 and number 38 in New Zealand. "Here We Go Again" was additionally certified Platinum in the US. The album's second and final single, "Remember December" failed to match the success of its predecessor, but peaked at number 80 on the UK Singles Chart. Lovato made her first 40-city national concert tour, Live in Concert, in support of Here We Go Again. The tour, from June 21 to August 21, 2009, had David Archuleta, KSM, and Jordan Pruitt as opening acts. Lovato and Archuleta received the Choice Music Tour award at the 2009 Teen Choice Awards. Lovato was featured alongside the Jonas Brothers, Miley Cyrus, and Selena Gomez on the song "Send It On", a charity single and the theme song for Disney's Friends for Change. All proceeds from the song were donated to environmental charities supported by the Disney Worldwide Conservation Fund. Lovato recorded "Gift of a Friend" as a soundtrack for the Disney movie Tinker Bell and the Lost Treasure. The movie was released in October 2009.

In 2010, Lovato and Joe Jonas recorded "Make a Wave" as the second charity single for Disney's Friends for Change. That May, Lovato guest-starred as Hayley May, a teenager misdiagnosed with schizophrenia, in the sixth-season Grey's Anatomy episode, "Shiny Happy People". Although critics praised her versatility, they were underwhelmed by her acting and felt that her appearance was designed primarily to attract viewers. Later that year, she headlined her first international tour, Demi Lovato: Live in Concert, and joined the Jonas Brothers: Live in Concert tour as a guest.

Camp Rock 2: The Final Jam, with Lovato reprising her role as Mitchie Torres, premiered on September 3, 2010. Critics were ambivalent about the film's plot, and it has a 40-percent approval rating on Rotten Tomatoes. However, Lovato's performance was called "dependably appealing" by Jennifer Armstrong of Entertainment Weekly. The film premiered to eight million viewers, the number-one cable television movie of the year by the number of viewers. Its accompanying soundtrack was released on August 10 with Lovato singing nine songs, including "Can't Back Down" and "Wouldn't Change a Thing". The soundtrack debuted at number three on the Billboard 200, with first-week sales of 41,000 copies. Jonas Brothers: Live in Concert was reworked to incorporate Lovato and the rest of the film's cast; it began on August 7, two weeks later than planned. The Sonny with a Chance soundtrack was released on October 5; Lovato sang on four tracks, including "Me, Myself and Time". It debuted (and peaked) at number 163 on the Billboard 200, her lowest-selling soundtrack. In November 2010, Lovato announced her departure from Sonny with a Chance, putting her acting career on hiatus and ending the series; she later said that she would return to acting when she felt confident doing so. Her departure led to the actual spin-off series So Random! with the Sonny cast, featuring sketches from the former show-within-a-show. The series was canceled after one season.

=== 2011–2012: Unbroken and The X Factor ===
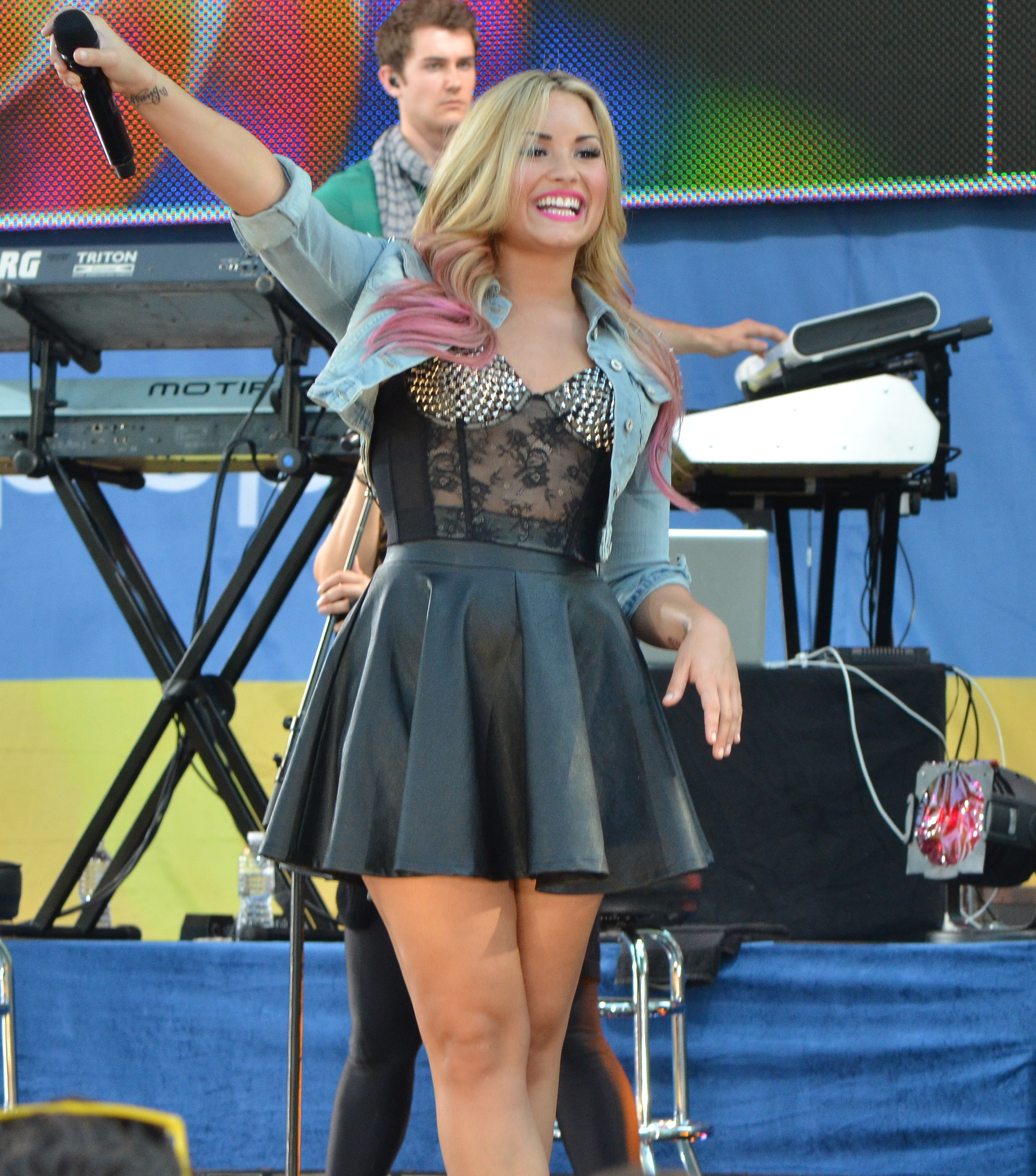
Lovato performing on Good Morning America in July 2012 as part of the program's Summer Concert Series

Lovato released her third studio album, Unbroken, on September 20, 2011. Begun in July 2010, the album experimented with R&B and featured less pop rock than her first two albums. Lyrically, Unbroken encompassed more mature themes as opposed to Lovato's previous works, with some songs focusing on her personal struggles. The album and its stylistic change received mixed reviews from critics, who praised Lovato's vocals and saw a growth in her musicianship due to the songs focusing on her struggles, but criticized the album's "party songs" and found the music to be more generic than her previous efforts. Unbroken debuted at number four in the US, selling 97,000 copies in its first week of release; it was later certified Gold.

"Skyscraper", the lead single from Unbroken, was released on July 12, and was noted for its messages of self-worth and confidence. It debuted at number ten in the US, selling 176,000 downloads during the first week of release, becoming Lovato's highest first week sales at the time. The song also became Lovato's highest-charting single since "This Is Me" peaking at number nine in July 2008, and it also debuted at number two on the Hot Digital Songs chart. "Skyscraper" received the Best Video With a Message award at the September 2012 MTV Video Music Awards, and the track was also certified Platinum by the RIAA and Silver by the BPI. The album's second and final single, "Give Your Heart a Break", was released on January 23, 2012, and later peaked on the Billboard Hot 100 at number 16, making Lovato's fourth highest-charting song to that point. It peaked at number 12 on the US Adult Top 40 chart and number one on the US Pop Songs chart. It also became the longest climb by a female artist (Note: Lovato identified as female at that time.) to reach No. 1 in the Pop Songs chart history until 2019, when Halsey's feature on "Eastside" broke the record. The song was certified triple Platinum in the US; as of October 2014, "Give Your Heart a Break" has sold 2.1 million digital copies. Billboard has ranked the song as Lovato's best, calling it "timeless".

In May, Lovato became a judge and mentor for the second season of the U.S. version of The X Factor, with a reported salary of one million dollars. Joining Britney Spears, Simon Cowell, and L.A. Reid, it was speculated that she was chosen to attract a younger audience. Mentoring the Young Adults category, her final act (CeCe Frey) becoming the ninth contestant eliminated. At the Minnesota State Fair in August, Lovato announced that after a pre-show performance at the 2012 MTV Video Music Awards she would release a single by December. On December 24, she released a video on her YouTube account of herself singing "Angels Among Us" dedicated to the victims of the Sandy Hook Elementary School shooting. In March, she was confirmed as returning for The X Factor's third season, with her salary reportedly doubling.

=== 2013–2014: Demi and Glee ===
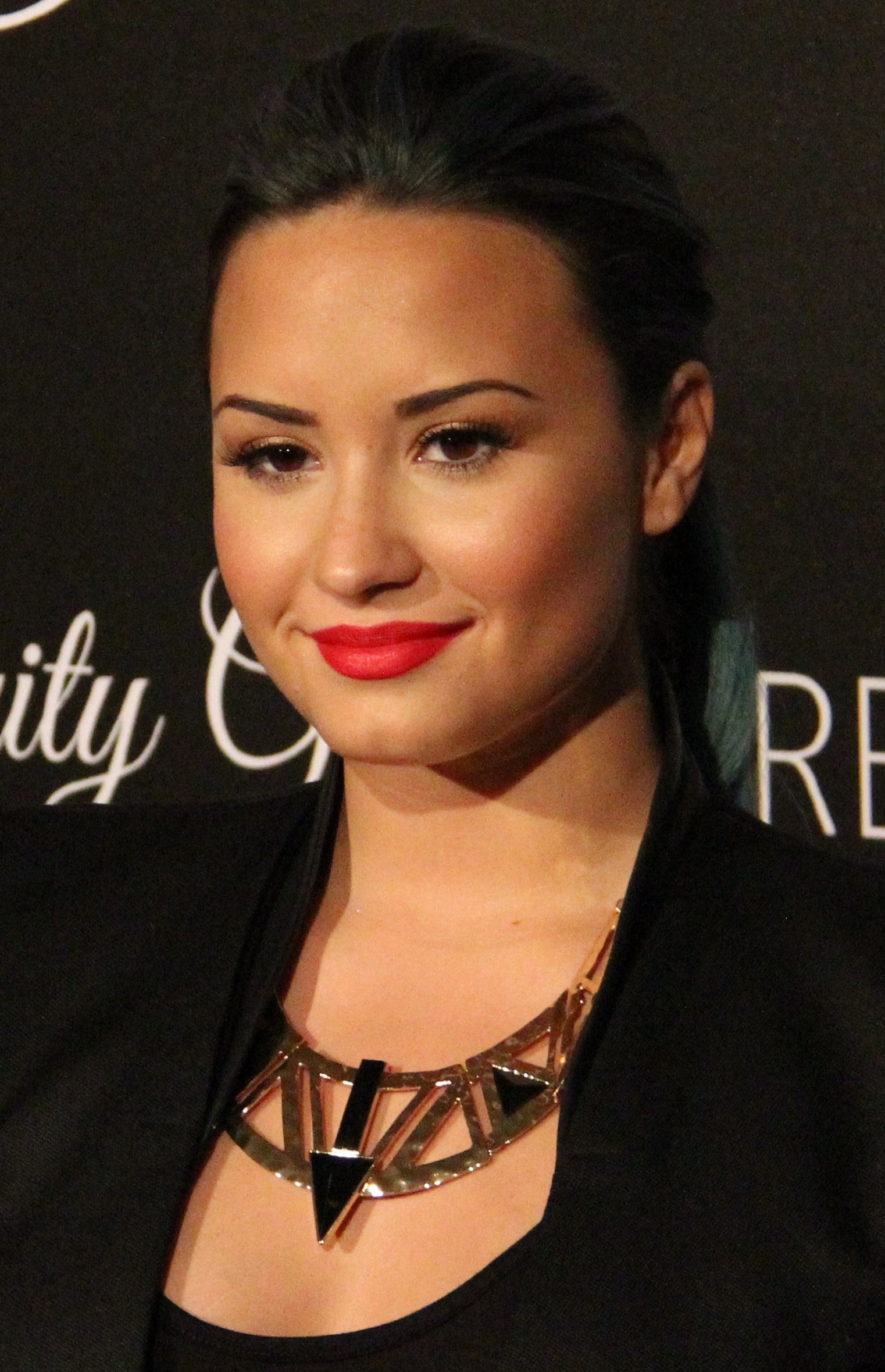
Lovato at the Redlight Traffic's Inaugural Dignity Gala in October 2013

Lovato's fourth studio album, Demi, was released on May 14, 2013. The album features influences of synthpop and bubblegum pop and was met with generally positive reviews from music critics. Although Jon Carmichael of The New York Times found Lovato's transition fun, according to Entertainment Weekly it signified a less mature image. The album debuted at number three in the US, with first-week sales of 110,000 copies, the best-selling debut week of Lovato's discography. It was also successful internationally, charting in the top ten in New Zealand, Spain and the UK. The album has been certified Gold in the US.

The lead single from Demi, "Heart Attack", was released on February 25, and debuted at number 12 in the US, with first-week sales of 215,000 copies, the highest first week sales of Lovato's discography. The song peaked at number ten (Lovato's third top ten entry in the US), and was also successful in the UK, Australia, and Europe. The second single, "Made in the USA" peaked at number 80 in the US. The third and fourth singles from Demi, "Neon Lights" and "Really Don't Care", both peaked in the top forty of the US, and at number one in the country's Dance Club Songs chart. She was also certified Platinum in the US.

Lovato later released a deluxe version of Demi, which included seven new tracks, consisting of four live performances and three studio recordings. One of these songs was "Up", a collaboration with Olly Murs for his fourth studio album Never Been Better. Lovato contributed to The Mortal Instruments: City of Bones soundtrack album with "Heart by Heart".

On June 11, Lovato released an e-book, Demi, on iBooks. She planned to appear in at least six episodes of the fifth season of Glee, but only appeared in four. She played Dani, a struggling New York-based artist who befriends Rachel Berry (Lea Michele) and Santana Lopez (Naya Rivera) and interacts with fellow newcomer Adam Lambert's character. Lovato debuted in the season's second episode, which aired on October 3, and made her final appearance in March 2014. On November 19, she released a book, Staying Strong: 365 Days a Year, which topped The New York Times bestseller list. She then agreed to write a memoir, which has yet to be released. While on The X Factor, her final act (Rion Paige) finished fifth.

Lovato announced her Neon Lights Tour (including a Canadian leg) on September 29, 2013; it began on February 9, 2014, and ended on May 17. On October 21, she released her cover of "Let It Go" for the Disney film Frozen, which was released in theaters on November 27. Lovato's cover was described as more "radio friendly" and "pop" as compared to the original by Idina Menzel. Lovato's cover appears in the film's credits, and the song was promoted as the single for the film's soundtrack. The song peaked at number 38 on the Billboard Hot 100, spending 20 weeks on the chart. It was certified double Platinum by the RIAA. On May 18, 2014, "Somebody to You" featuring Lovato was released as the fourth single from the Vamps' debut album, Meet the Vamps.

On May 29, Lovato announced the Demi World Tour, which marked her fourth concert tour (and first world tour, covering 25 cities) and second in support of her album Demi. In November 2014, she opened the UK shows on Enrique Iglesias' Sex and Love Tour, and worked with longtime friend Nick Jonas on the song "Avalanche" from his self-titled album. On December 24, Lovato released a music video for the song "Nightingale".

=== 2015–2016: Confident ===
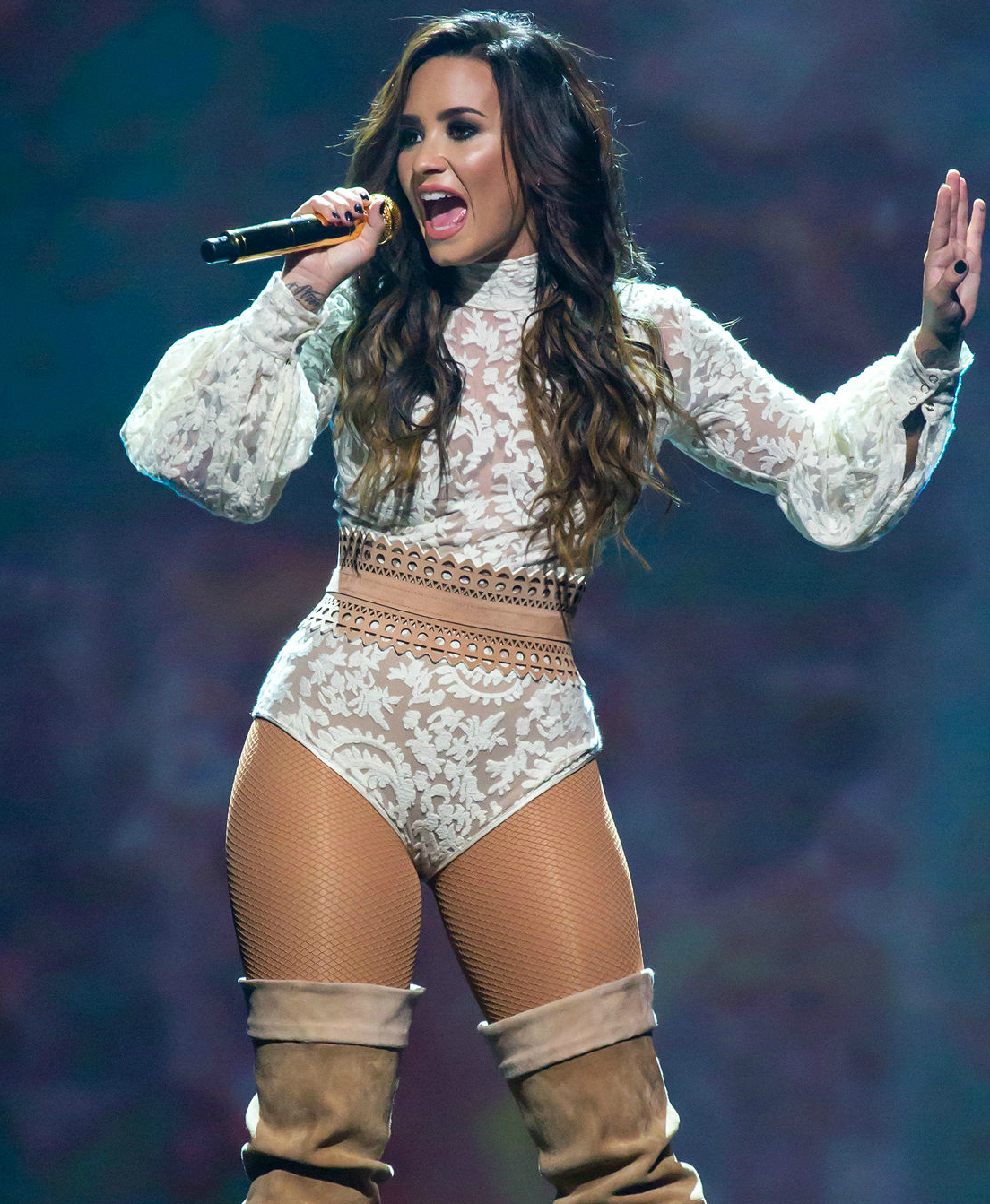
Lovato performing on her Future Now Tour in September 2016

In May 2015, Billboard revealed that Lovato was in the process of starting an "artist-centric" new record label, Safehouse Records, of which she would be co-founder and co-owner. The label would be a partnership between Lovato, Nick Jonas, and her then-manager Phil McIntyre, and will form part of a new collaborative arrangement with record label Island. Her fifth studio album, Confident, was released through the new venture deal. This would be Lovato's second multi-label venture of her career; she was formerly part of Jonas Records, a UMG/Hollywood/Jonas Brothers partnership, which is now defunct.

Lovato released "Cool for the Summer" as the lead single from her fifth studio album, on July 1, 2015. The song attracted attention for its bi-curious theme, and was a commercial success, peaking at number eleven on the Billboard Hot 100, and reached the top ten in the United Kingdom and New Zealand, and was certified triple Platinum by the RIAA. On September 18, 2015, the title track "Confident" was released as the album's second single and peaked at number 21 on the Hot 100. It topped the Billboard Dance Club Songs chart and was later certified quadruple Platinum by the RIAA. Lovato performed as the musical guest on an episode of the NBC late-night sketch comedy Saturday Night Live in October 2015. Lovato was also featured on the re-release of "Irresistible", the fourth single from Fall Out Boy's sixth studio album American Beauty/American Psycho.

Lovato's fifth album, Confident, was released on October 16, 2015, and was nominated for Best Pop Vocal Album at the 59th Annual Grammy Awards. The album debuted at number two on the US Billboard 200 with first-week sales of 98,000 album units, and was certified Platinum by the RIAA. The album received mixed to positive reviews from critics. Annie Zaleski from The A.V. Club stated that "Confident is an impressive album by a pop star who knows what she wants—and also knows exactly how to get there." During the album's production, Lovato commented: "I've already started recording for my new album, and I have plans to record during the tour. The sound just evolves into everything that I've been and everything that I want to become." During October 2015, she signed with the major modeling agency, Wilhelmina Models. Lovato released the music video for her R&B-infused song "Waitin for You" featuring rapper Sirah on October 22, 2015. On October 26, 2015, Lovato and Nick Jonas announced that they would be touring together on the Future Now Tour, to further promote Confident, with shows in North America and Europe. Lovato was honored with the first-ever Rulebreaker Award at the 2015 Billboard Women in Music event. On March 21, 2016, "Stone Cold" was released as the third and final single from Confident. On July 1, 2016, Lovato released a new single titled "Body Say" to promote her tour.

In 2016, Lovato was honored with the GLAAD Vanguard Award at the 27th GLAAD Media Awards, for her support of the rights of the LGBT community. Lovato was also named to Forbes' 30 Under 30 list in the music category.

=== 2017–2018: Tell Me You Love Me ===
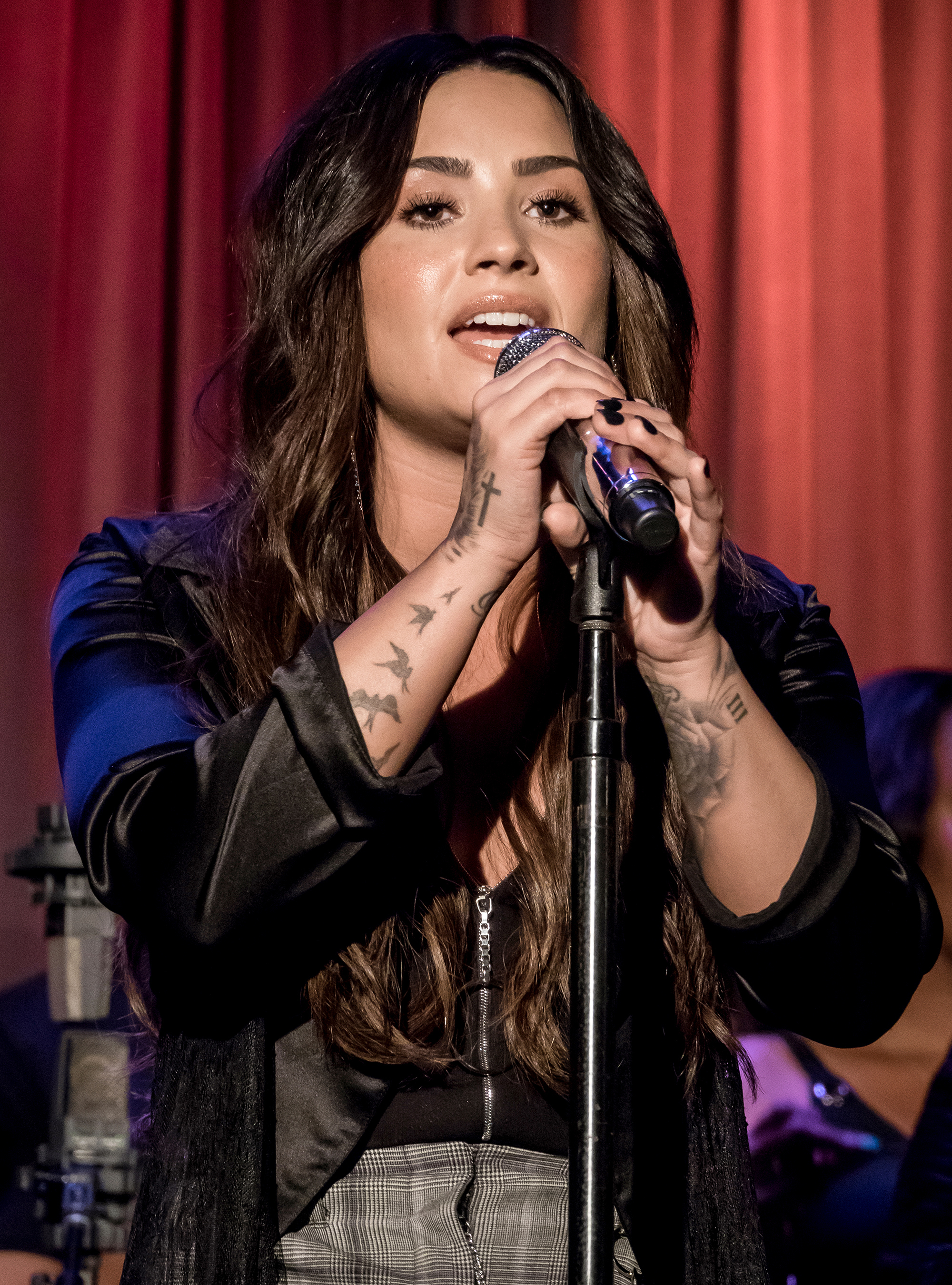
Lovato performing at the Grammy Museum at L.A. Live in September 2017

In February 2017, Lovato executive-produced a documentary, Beyond Silence, which follows three individuals and their experiences with mental illnesses including bipolar disorder, schizophrenia, depression, and anxiety. Lovato featured in Cheat Codes' song "No Promises", released in March 2017, and Jax Jones's "Instruction" along with Stefflon Don, released in June 2017. In 2017, Lovato was included in Time magazine's annual list of the 100 most influential people in the world. On May 8, 2017, she announced a collaboration with sportswear line Fabletics to support the United Nations' initiative, Girl Up.

In July 2017, Lovato released "Sorry Not Sorry" as the lead single from her sixth studio album, which became her highest-charting song in New Zealand and the United States at number six as well as Australia at number eight. It also became her highest-certified song in the US for its quintuple Platinum certification by RIAA. Released on September 29, Tell Me You Love Me debuted at number three on the US Billboard 200 with 74,000 album-equivalent units, including 48,000 pure album sales. It received positive reviews from music critics and became Lovato's first album to be certified Platinum in the US. On October 17, Lovato released Demi Lovato: Simply Complicated on YouTube, a documentary focusing on her career and personal struggles. It was nominated for "Best Music Documentary" at the 2018 MTV Movie & TV Awards. In February 2018, Lovato embarked on her Tell Me You Love Me World Tour.

In November 2017, Lovato released the single "Échame la Culpa" with Puerto Rican singer Luis Fonsi. Lovato performed at the March for Our Lives anti-gun violence rally in Washington, D.C. on March 24, 2018. In May, Lovato was featured on Christina Aguilera's "Fall in Line" and Clean Bandit's "Solo", and the latter became Lovato's first number-one song in the United Kingdom. On June 21, Lovato released a new single, titled "Sober", which she referred to as "my truth"; it discusses struggles with addiction and sobriety. The Tell Me You Love Me World Tour concluded the following month due to Lovato's drug overdose. It was originally scheduled to end in November 2018.

=== 2019–2021: Acting return and Dancing with the Devil... the Art of Starting Over ===
On May 11, 2019, Lovato revealed she had signed with a new manager, Scooter Braun. She shared that she "couldn't be happier, inspired and excited to begin this next chapter". In August 2019, it was revealed that Lovato would appear in Eurovision Song Contest: The Story of Fire Saga, a Netflix original film, directed by David Dobkin, based on the song competition of the same name. The film was ultimately released on June 26, 2020, and starred Will Ferrell and Rachel McAdams. This marked Lovato's first acting appearance since her guest role on Glee in 2013 and her first film role since Camp Rock 2: The Final Jam (2010). Later in the month, after teasing that she had been working on a new project, Lovato revealed her return to television with a recurring guest role in the final season of the NBC sitcom Will & Grace, where she played Will's surrogate.

In January 2020, Lovato made her first musical appearance since her hiatus with a performance of single "Anyone" at the 62nd Annual Grammy Awards. The song, which was recorded four days prior to her 2018 drug overdose, was released on iTunes immediately after. On February 2, 2020, Lovato performed "The Star-Spangled Banner" at Super Bowl LIV. On March 6, Lovato released a new single titled "I Love Me". The release was supplemented by both a guest appearance and guest-host role on The Ellen DeGeneres Show. On April 16, she released a collaboration with Sam Smith titled "I'm Ready". Rolling Stone ranked this song at number 32 on its list of The 50 Most Inspirational LGBTQ Songs of All Time. A remix of "Lonely Hearts" by JoJo featuring Lovato was released on August 28, 2020. At the 2020 MTV Video Music Awards, Lovato received two nominations for her song "I Love Me", becoming the first artist in VMA history to receive a nomination every year for eight consecutive years. On September 10, Lovato released a collaboration with American DJ Marshmello, titled "OK Not to Be OK", in partnership with the Hope For The Day suicide prevention movement. On September 30, 2020, Lovato released "Still Have Me" via Twitter; the song was later released on digital platforms. On October 14, she released a political ballad titled "Commander in Chief", ahead of the 2020 presidential election. She hosted the 46th People's Choice Awards on November 15, 2020. On November 20, she featured on American rapper Jeezy's song "My Reputation" from his album The Recession 2. On December 4, Lovato featured on a remix of the song "Monsters" by rock band All Time Low, alongside Blackbear.

Lovato was chosen to perform during Celebrating America, the primetime television special marking the inauguration of Joe Biden. Lovato sang "Lovely Day" by Bill Withers, with appearances from President Joe Biden with his grandson.

A four-part documentary series following Lovato's life premiered on YouTube in March 2021. The series, titled Demi Lovato: Dancing with the Devil, was directed by Michael D. Ratner and showcased her personal and musical journey over the past three years. It was later announced that Lovato's seventh studio album, titled Dancing with the Devil... the Art of Starting Over, would be released on April 2, 2021. Lovato defined it "the non-official soundtrack to the documentary". The album features collaborations with Ariana Grande, Noah Cyrus and Saweetie, as well as the previously released "What Other People Say", a collaboration between Lovato and Australian singer-songwriter Sam Fischer, initially released on February 4, 2021. Dancing with the Devil... the Art of Starting Over debuted at number two on the Billboard 200 with first-week sales of 74,000 album-equivalent units in the US. Prior to the release of the album, Lovato released one of the two title tracks "Dancing with the Devil" on March 26, and "Met Him Last Night" on April 1, 2021. The Dave Audé remix of the song was nominated for Best Remixed Recording at the 64th Annual Grammy Awards. On August 20, 2021, Lovato released the "Melon Cake" music video.

Lovato launched a podcast series titled 4D with Demi Lovato on May 19, 2021, with new episodes released every Wednesday. Confirmed guests for the podcast include Chelsea Handler, Jane Fonda, Jameela Jamil, Alok Vaid-Menon, and Glennon Doyle. On July 30, 2021, a talk show hosted by Lovato titled The Demi Lovato Show was released on The Roku Channel. Consisting of ten-minute episodes, it features candid, unfiltered conversations between Lovato and both expert and celebrity guests, exploring topics such as activism, body positivity, gender identity, sex, relationships, social media, and wellness. The show had initially been announced in February 2020 to air on Quibi under the title Pillow Talk with Demi Lovato before Quibi sold its contents to Roku.

On September 17, 2021, American rapper G-Eazy released "Breakdown" featuring Lovato as the second single from his album These Things Happen Too. On September 30, Lovato launched a four-episode series titled Unidentified with Demi Lovato on Peacock. The show follows Lovato as she searches for signs of extraterrestrial life with her sister Dallas and friend Matthew Montgomery.

=== 2022–2024: Holy Fvck and Revamped ===
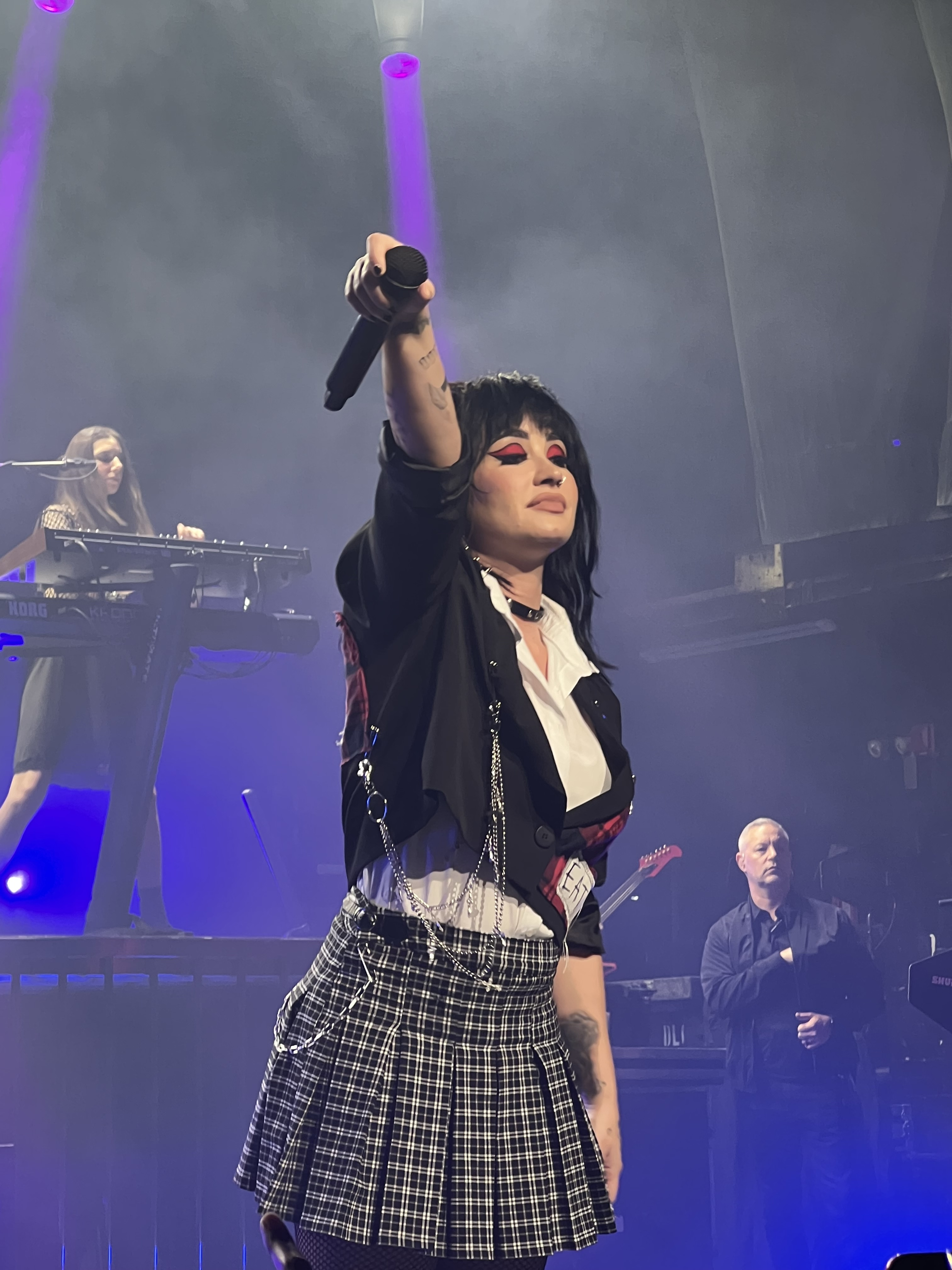
Lovato performing on her Holy Fvck Tour in October 2022

In early 2022, Lovato began teasing her eighth studio album, and described it as "more rock than anything". She stated that the record is reminiscent of her debut studio album, Don't Forget (2008), and would explore "heaviness" in its sound. Lovato further called the album her "absolute best yet" and "so representative of [her]". In February, the singer appeared on "FIIMY (Fuck It, I Miss You)", a collaboration with Winnetka Bowling League; its live rendition followed later that month. "Skin of My Teeth", the lead single from Lovato's forthcoming album, was released on June 10, 2022. She premiered the song a day earlier on The Tonight Show Starring Jimmy Fallon. On June 6, the title of the album was officially announced as Holy Fvck; it was released on August 19, 2022. Holy Fvck was preceded by two other singles: "Substance" in July and "29" in August. The album debuted at number seven on the US Billboard 200 with 33,000 album-equivalent units, becoming Lovato's eighth consecutive top-ten entry on the chart. It also topped the Billboard Top Rock Albums and Top Alternative Albums charts. In support of Holy Fvck, Lovato embarked on its namesake tour, which spanned 34 shows from August to November 2022, visiting North America and South America. In August 2022, a poster advertising the album and featuring Lovato in a bondage-style outfit lying on a cushioned crucifix was banned in the UK by the Advertising Standards Authority for being "likely to cause serious offence to Christians".

On March 3, 2023, Lovato released "Still Alive", the lead single for the soundtrack to the slasher film Scream VI. The song received a nomination for the MTV Movie & TV Award for Best Song. After performing a rock version of her 2013 song "Heart Attack" on tour, Lovato officially released it with re-recorded vocals on March 24. In the following months, she continued to release rock versions of her previous hits, "Cool for the Summer" and "Sorry Not Sorry" (the latter featuring guitarist Slash), with a "darker sound backed by electric guitars and grittier lyric delivery from Lovato." Forbes said that re-recording her hits as "rock anthems" is a "brilliant business move," and stated that it "showcases her artistic versatility and demonstrates her willingness to evolve as an artist." In May, Lovato guest-starred as herself in "Met Gala", the eighth episode of the third season of comedy series Dave. On June 22, she surprise-released the song "Swine" as a protest song two days before the one-year anniversary of the Supreme Court's decision to overturn Roe v. Wade. A charity single, Lovato's net profits from it were donated to the Demi Lovato Foundation's Reproductive Justice Fund for a year, which used the proceeds to support the nonprofits: NARAL Pro-Choice America, Plan C, and the National Network of Abortion Funds.

Lovato's first remix album Revamped, comprising ten re-recordings of previous songs in rock format, was released on September 15, 2023. In a press release, she said: "breathing new life into the songs that played such a huge role in my career has allowed me to feel so much closer to my music than ever before." The rock version of "Confident" was released as the album's fourth and final single in August. Revamped received positive reviews from critics, who praised Lovato's vocals, the record's rock production, and new iteration of the songs. On August 4, the fourth remix of the song "Eve, Psyche & the Bluebeard's Wife" by South Korean girl group Le Sserafim was released, which featured Lovato. A week after, Lovato released a cover of the song "Let Me Down Easy" from the series Daisy Jones & the Six. On August 29, Brazilian singer-songwriter Luísa Sonza released her third studio album Escândalo Íntimo, which contains the Portuguese-language song "Penhasco2", a collaboration between Sonza and Lovato. Also in August, it was revealed that Lovato was no longer represented by Scooter Braun and SB Projects, having left his management that July. She signed with Brandon Creed and his Good World Management in September.

On September 10, 2023, Lovato did a special performance in the "Kickoff Show" for the tenth season of The Masked Singer as "Anonymouse". She performed a medley at the 2023 MTV Video Music Awards two days later, and was chosen by Billboard and USA Today as one of the best performances of the show. Lovato executive produced and hosted A Very Demi Holiday Special, which featured multiple celebrity guest appearances and premiered on December 8, 2023, on Roku. Also in December, she made a guest appearance in the television special Dynamo Is Dead. Lovato conducted a New Year's Eve concert at the Cosmopolitan of Las Vegas in Paradise, Nevada. She was featured on a blues cover of "Papa Was a Rolling Stone" with Slash, from his second solo album Orgy of the Damned, released on May 17, 2024. Lovato made a surprise appearance at regional Mexican band Grupo Firme's Austin concert, on August 2, to perform their Spanglish collaboration "Chula", which was released on August 15. She co-headlined the inaugural Hera HSBC festival on August 25 in Mexico City. Lovato starred in and made her directorial debut with Child Star, a documentary film she co-directed with Nicola Marsh and co-produced under her own DLG, alongside OBB Media and SB Projects. The film features Lovato's interviews with six former child stars, and "examines the high highs and low lows of growing up in the spotlight". It was released on Hulu on September 17, 2024. In promotion of the film, Lovato released the song "You'll Be OK, Kid" on September 13.

=== 2025–present: It's Not That Deep ===
In October 2024, Lovato revealed that she was working on her next studio album, describing it as "not rock at all": "I've spent a year exploring with my sound". She added that she wrote "nothing but love songs and sexy songs because I'm in this really good place". Lovato starred alongside Rose Byrne, Dominic Sessa, Ariana DeBose, and Octavia Spencer in the Stephanie Laing-directed Tow, which premiered on June 7, 2025, at the 2025 Tribeca Festival and received positive reviews. She played a homeless pregnant woman named Nova.

On August 1, 2025, Lovato released "Fast" as the lead single off her ninth album. The second single, "Here All Night", was released on September 12; the third single, titled "Kiss", was released on October 10. The album, It's Not That Deep, was released on October 24, and debuted at number nine on the Billboard 200. To promote the album, Lovato performed in a one night only show at the Hollywood Palladium on October 25. She also began the It's Not That Deep Tour in support of it on April 13, 2026.

Lovato released her own cookbook, One Plate at a Time, on March 31, 2026. It was published by Flatiron Books, an imprint of Macmillan Publishers.

== Artistry ==
=== Influences and musical style ===
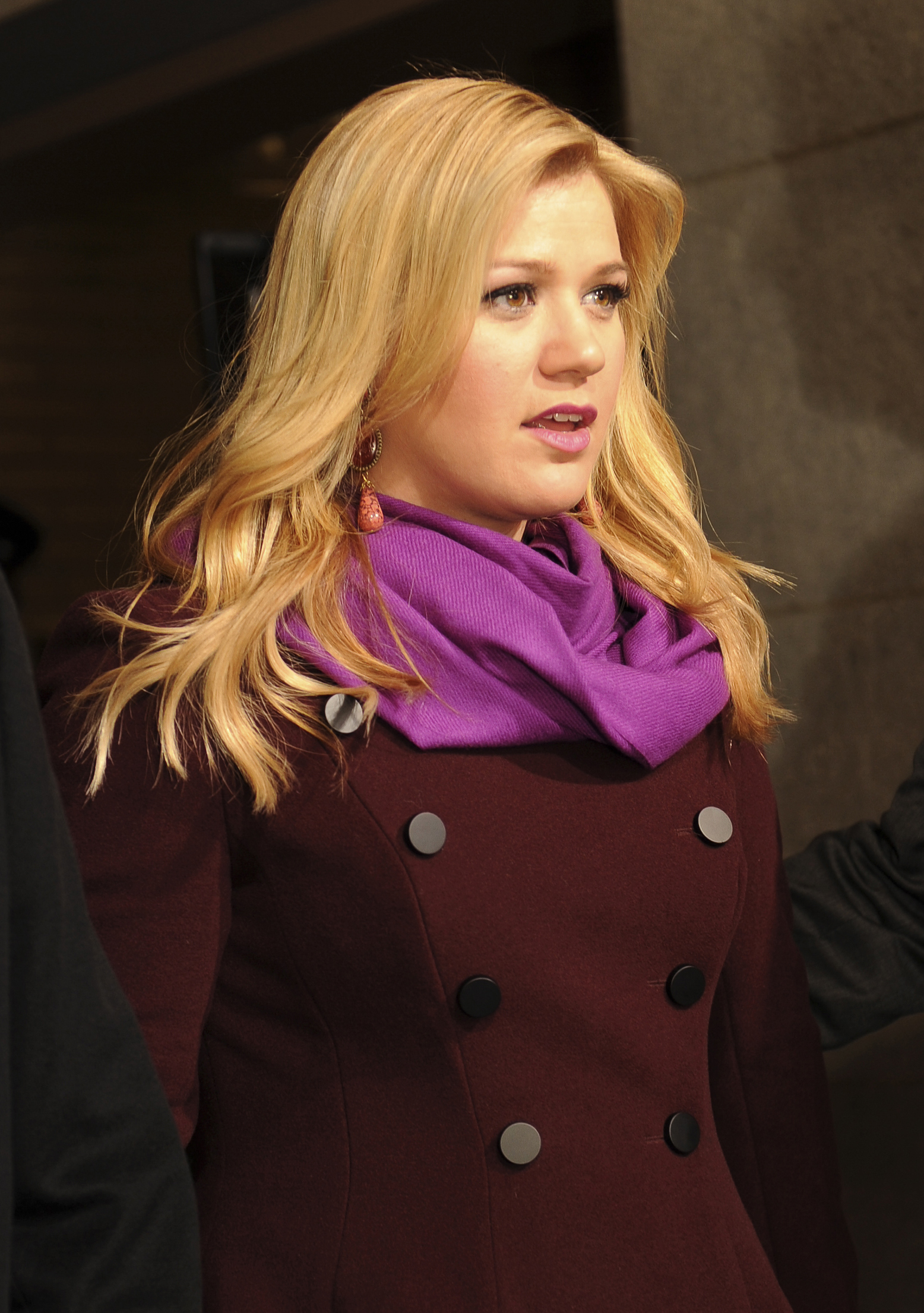
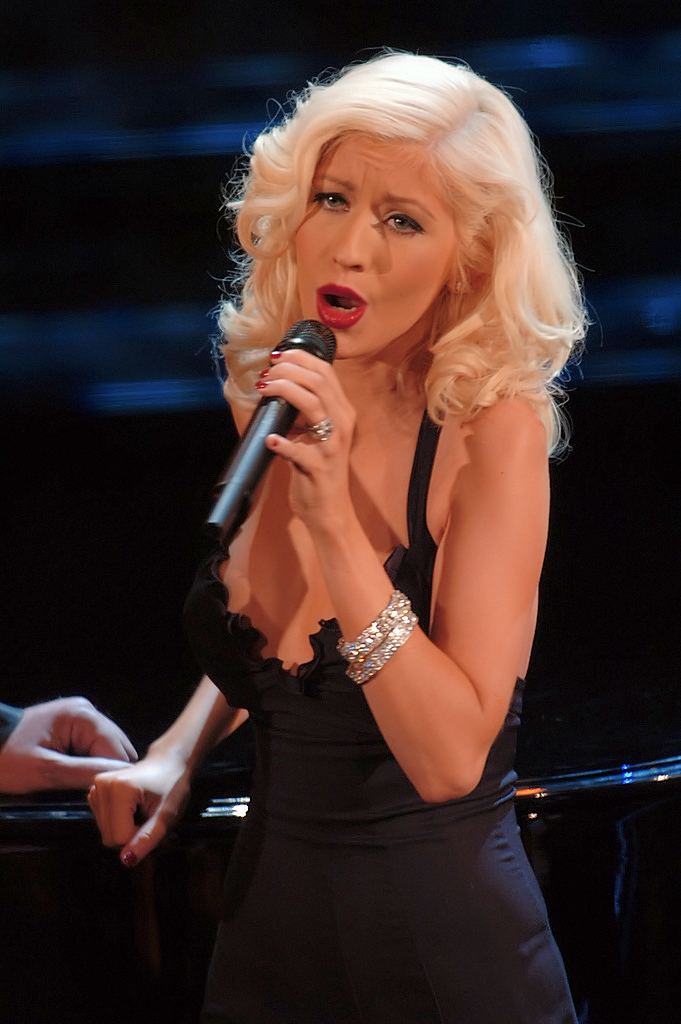
Lovato credits Kelly Clarkson (left) and Christina Aguilera (right) as her main musical influences.

Lovato has frequently cited "power vocalists" such as Christina Aguilera, Kelly Clarkson, Whitney Houston, and Aretha Franklin as major musical and vocal influences. Lovato says, "I had a lot of respect for Whitney Houston, and Christina Aguilera." About her admiration for Clarkson, Lovato says, "I just thought she was a great role model. I feel like she set a really great example and she was extremely talented." Lovato also said that she was "obsessed with Kelly Clarkson" as a child, and she even had an AOL username, "Little Kelly", inspired by the singer.

Her other influences or inspirations include Britney Spears, Rihanna, JoJo, Keri Hilson, Jennifer Lopez, Gladys Knight, Alexz Johnson, Billie Holiday, the Spice Girls, and Billy Gilman. About Gilman she said, "We had the same voice range when I was young. I would practice to his songs all the time." In her teens, Lovato listened to heavy metal music, including bands such as the Devil Wears Prada, Job for a Cowboy, Maylene and the Sons of Disaster, and Bring Me the Horizon. She has said that John Mayer's songwriting has in particular been a "huge influence" on hers and that he taught her to write songs by starting with the titles. Following the release of Unbroken, her musical style shifted towards hip hop and R&B. Upon the release of the song "Without a Fight" by country music singer Brad Paisley featuring Lovato, she cited the country genre as a lifelong strong musical influence of hers, as she "grew up listening to country" and her mother "was a country singer".

Lovato's Neon Lights Tour was "inspired by Beyoncé" and specifically her 2013 self-titled visual album in regard to the visuals shown onscreen. Moreover, Lovato revealed that her sixth studio album, Tell Me You Love Me, was inspired by Aguilera. Lovato said "I grew up listening to Christina Aguilera. She was one of my idols growing up. She still is. Her voice is incredible, and in Stripped you really got to hear that. I think it was her breakout album that really transformed her into the icon that she is today. So that inspired me … she really inspired this album. I was even inspired by the black and white artwork!"

Lovato's music primarily incorporates pop, specifically dance-pop and pop rock.

=== Voice ===
Throughout her career, Lovato has received acclaim from critics for her singing abilities and mezzo-soprano voice. Regarding her vocals on Don't Forget, Nick Levine of Digital Spy stated, "she's certainly a stronger singer than the Jonases. In fact, her full-bodied vocal performances are consistently impressive." According to Sophie Schillaci of The Hollywood Reporter, Lovato "has a voice that can silence even the harshest of critics." In his review of Lovato's second studio album Here We Go Again, Jeff Miers from The Buffalo News stated, "Unlike so many of her Disney-fied peers, Lovato can really sing," and he found it "refreshing" that she "doesn't need the help of Auto-Tune ... to mask any lack of natural ability."

Commenting on working with Lovato on her third studio album Unbroken, Ryan Tedder stated that Lovato "blew me out of the water vocally! I had no idea how good her voice is. She's one of the best singers I've ever worked with. Literally, that good ... I mean, she's a Kelly Clarkson-level vocalist. And Kelly has a set of pipes." He also commented on their work together on the song "Neon Lights" from her fourth studio album, saying that Lovato "has one of the biggest ranges, possibly the highest full voice singer I've ever worked with." Tamsyn Wilce from Alter the Press commented on her vocals on Demi, stating "it shows just how strong her vocal chords [sic] are and the variation of styles that she can completely work to make her own."

In a review of the Demi World Tour, Marielle Wakim from Los Angeles magazine praised Lovato's vocals, commenting, "For those who haven't bothered to follow Lovato's career, let's get something out of the way: [Lovato] can sing.... At 22 years old, her vocal range is astounding." Wakim also described Lovato's vocals as "spectacular".

Lovato was lauded for her performance of "The Star-Spangled Banner" at Super Bowl LIV in 2020. Patrick Ryan of USA Today commended her for delivering a "flawless performance" and described Lovato as "one of the best vocalists in the industry today". He remarked that Lovato "hit all the high notes with ease" and ultimately "even added some of her own riffs" which he says resulted in "a rendition that was uniquely and phenomenally" her own.

== Personal life ==
=== Residence ===
On August 20, 2010, her 18th birthday, Lovato purchased a Mediterranean-style house in Los Angeles for her family; however, Lovato decided to live in a "sober house" in Los Angeles after leaving rehab in January 2011. In September 2016, Lovato also purchased a Laurel Canyon home in Los Angeles for $8.3 million, which she sold in June 2020 for $8.25 million. In September 2020, Lovato purchased a Studio City home in Los Angeles for $7 million.

=== Sexuality, gender, and relationships ===
For a few months, Lovato dated singer Trace Cyrus in 2009. Lovato briefly dated her Camp Rock co-star Joe Jonas in 2010. Lovato then had an on-again, off-again relationship with actor Wilmer Valderrama; they first began dating in August 2010 when Valderrama was 29 and Lovato was 18. They ended their relationship in June 2016. Her 2022 single "29" was widely believed to be about Valderrama and the significant age gap in their relationship, although Lovato did not confirm this. On July 23, 2020, Lovato announced her engagement to actor Max Ehrich. The two had begun dating four months prior, but eventually called off the engagement that September.

Lovato describes her sexuality as fluid, and has said she is open to finding love with someone of any gender. In July 2020, she labeled herself queer in a social media statement mourning the death of her Glee co-star Naya Rivera. In March 2021, Lovato came out as pansexual and sexually fluid, stating, "I've always known I was hella queer, but I have fully embraced it." In the same interview, she called herself "just too queer" to date men at the time. She also expressed feeling proud of belonging to the "alphabet mafia", referring to the LGBT community.

On May 19, 2021, Lovato publicly came out as non-binary and announced the decision to change her gender pronouns to they/them, stating that "this has come after a lot of healing and self-reflective work. I'm still learning and coming into myself; I don't claim to be an expert or a spokesperson. Sharing this with you now opens another level of vulnerability for me." She had previously come out as non-binary to her family and friends towards the end of 2020. In April 2022, Lovato changed her pronouns to additionally include she/her, and later described herself as a "fluid person" who had started to feel "more feminine". That September, she reiterated that she "still feel[s] very comfortable with they/them".

In early August 2022, People reported that Lovato was in a "happy and healthy relationship" with a male musician. On August 20, Canadian musician Jordan "Jutes" Lutes announced the relationship in an Instagram post marking Lovato's 30th birthday. On December 16, 2023, Lovato and Lutes announced their engagement. The couple were married on May 25, 2025, at the Bellosguardo Estate in Santa Barbara, California.

=== Mental health and substance abuse ===
Lovato had suffered from bulimia nervosa, self-harm, and being bullied before her first stint in rehab at age 18. On November 1, 2010, Lovato withdrew from the Jonas Brothers: Live in Concert tour, entering a treatment facility for "physical and emotional issues". It was reported that she decided to enter treatment after punching backup dancer Alex Welch; her family and management team convinced her that she needed help. Lovato said she took "100 percent, full responsibility" for the incident. On January 28, 2011, she completed in-patient treatment at Timberline Knolls and returned home. Lovato acknowledged that she had bulimia, had cut herself, and had been "self-medicating" with drugs and alcohol "like a lot of teens do to numb their pain". She added that she "basically had a nervous breakdown" and had been diagnosed with bipolar disorder during her treatment. She later commented that she used to use cocaine several times a day and smuggled cocaine onto airplanes. In a 2022 interview on the podcast Call Her Daddy, Lovato added that she began using opiates at the age of 13 after a car accident and "was already drinking" by that time. She said that this eventually led her to use cocaine at the age of 17.

In April 2011, Lovato became a contributing editor for Seventeen magazine, penning an article that described her struggles. In March 2012, MTV aired a documentary, Demi Lovato: Stay Strong, about her rehab and recovery. She began work on her fourth studio album the following month. Lovato celebrated the five-year anniversary of her sobriety on March 15, 2017.

In her 2017 YouTube documentary Demi Lovato: Simply Complicated, Lovato revealed that her treatment at Timberline Knolls had not been entirely successful, stating that she still struggled with alcoholism and a cocaine addiction in the year following her stint in the treatment center and further admitting that she was in fact under the influence of cocaine while being interviewed about her sobriety for Demi Lovato: Stay Strong. She stated, "I wasn't working my program. I wasn't ready to get sober. I was sneaking it on planes, sneaking it in bathrooms, sneaking it throughout the night. Nobody knew."

Lovato also stated that her drug and alcohol addiction not only caused her to nearly overdose several times, but later began to impact her ability to perform live and promote her Unbroken album, referencing a 2012 performance on American Idol where she was severely hungover. After her management team had expressed their intentions to leave her, Lovato agreed to resume treatment and counseling for her addiction, leading to her move to a sober-living facility in Los Angeles with roommates and responsibilities to help her overcome her drug and alcohol problems. Although she had previously stated that she was entirely done with hard drugs such as heroin, Lovato revealed in March 2021 that she was not completely sober; she drank alcohol and smoked marijuana in moderation at that point, a choice that many of her friends openly disagreed with. She decided on moderation as she felt she was setting herself up for failure if she told herself she was never going to drink or smoke again. Lovato said it was because it had been drilled into her that "one drink was equivalent to a crack pipe." This changed the following December when she abandoned her "California sober ways" and declared herself "sober sober".

In 2021, Lovato said she had initially accepted her bipolar disorder diagnosis and shared this in 2011 because it explained her erratic behavior, but later came to believe it was inaccurate: "I was acting out when I was 18 for many reasons, but I know now from multiple different doctors that it was not because I was bipolar. I had to grow the fuck up." Lovato has also been diagnosed with attention deficit hyperactivity disorder (ADHD).

==== Other struggles ====
On June 21, 2018, Lovato released the single "Sober" in which she revealed she had relapsed after six years of sobriety. On July 24, 2018, she was rushed to the Cedars-Sinai Medical Center in Los Angeles after emergency services were called to her home due to an opioid overdose. Lovato recalled, "The doctors told me that I had five to 10 minutes, like, if no one had found me, then I wouldn't be here." The singer was reported to be stable and recovering later in the day. She reportedly overdosed on oxycodone laced with fentanyl and was revived with naloxone.

Lovato also had multiple health complications stemming from the overdose, including multiple strokes, a heart attack, and brain damage, the latter of which caused lasting vision problems. She was hospitalized for two weeks and subsequently entered an in-patient rehab facility. Lovato's drug overdose received widespread media coverage, leading to her becoming the most googled person of 2018. CBS News ranked the overdose the 29th biggest story of 2018. In December 2018, Lovato took to Twitter to debunk rumors regarding her overdose and went on to thank fans, writing that one day she was going to "tell the world what exactly happened, why it happened and what my life is like today .. but until I'm ready to share that with people please stop prying and making up shit that you know nothing about. I still need space and time to heal."

Lovato addressed the matter during a 2020 appearance on The Ellen DeGeneres Show, elaborating on how her worsened struggles with bulimia in 2018 contributed to her eventual drug overdose as she relapsed three months prior to the incident due to being extremely unhappy. The singer attributed these struggles to the extreme measures that her then-manager, Phil McIntyre, took to control the food she ingested. Lovato further explained that, along with the controlling nature of her management team, they did not provide her with the help she needed. Moreover, she recounted that her thought process the night she relapsed after six years of sobriety was as follows, "I'm six years sober and I'm miserable. I'm even more miserable than I was when I was drinking. Why am I sober?"

In 2021, Lovato said she was raped at age 15 when she was an actor on the Disney Channel, and that the rapist was a co-star whom she had to continue seeing thereafter. The incident contributed to her bulimia and self-harm. She told someone about the incident, but the assaulter "never got in trouble for it. They never got taken out of the movie they were in." Lovato stated she did not acknowledge the act as rape at the time, because sexual activity was not normalized to her, and she was part of the Disney crowd who wore purity rings and were waiting until marriage. However, she decided to share her experience because she believed that everyone should "speak their voice if they can and feel comfortable doing so". Lovato also stated she was raped during her 2018 drug overdose, realizing a month after the incident that she was not in a place to consent at that point.

== Other ventures ==
=== Activism and philanthropy ===
Lovato's work as an LGBT rights activist has been recognized by GLAAD, which awarded her the Vanguard Award in 2016. When the Defense of Marriage Act was appealed in June 2013, Lovato celebrated the occasion on social media. Lovato has previously affirmed her support for the LGBT community: "I believe in gay marriage, I believe in equality. I think there's a lot of hypocrisy with religion. But I just found that you can have your own relationship with God, and I still have a lot of faith." In May 2014, Lovato was named lead performer for NYC Pride Week and Grand Marshal of the LA Pride Parade, where she later filmed the music video for "Really Don't Care". Lovato became the face of Human Rights Campaign's America's for Marriage Equality in 2015. In June 2016, Lovato participated in a video released by the Human Rights Campaign honoring the victims of the Orlando nightclub shooting.

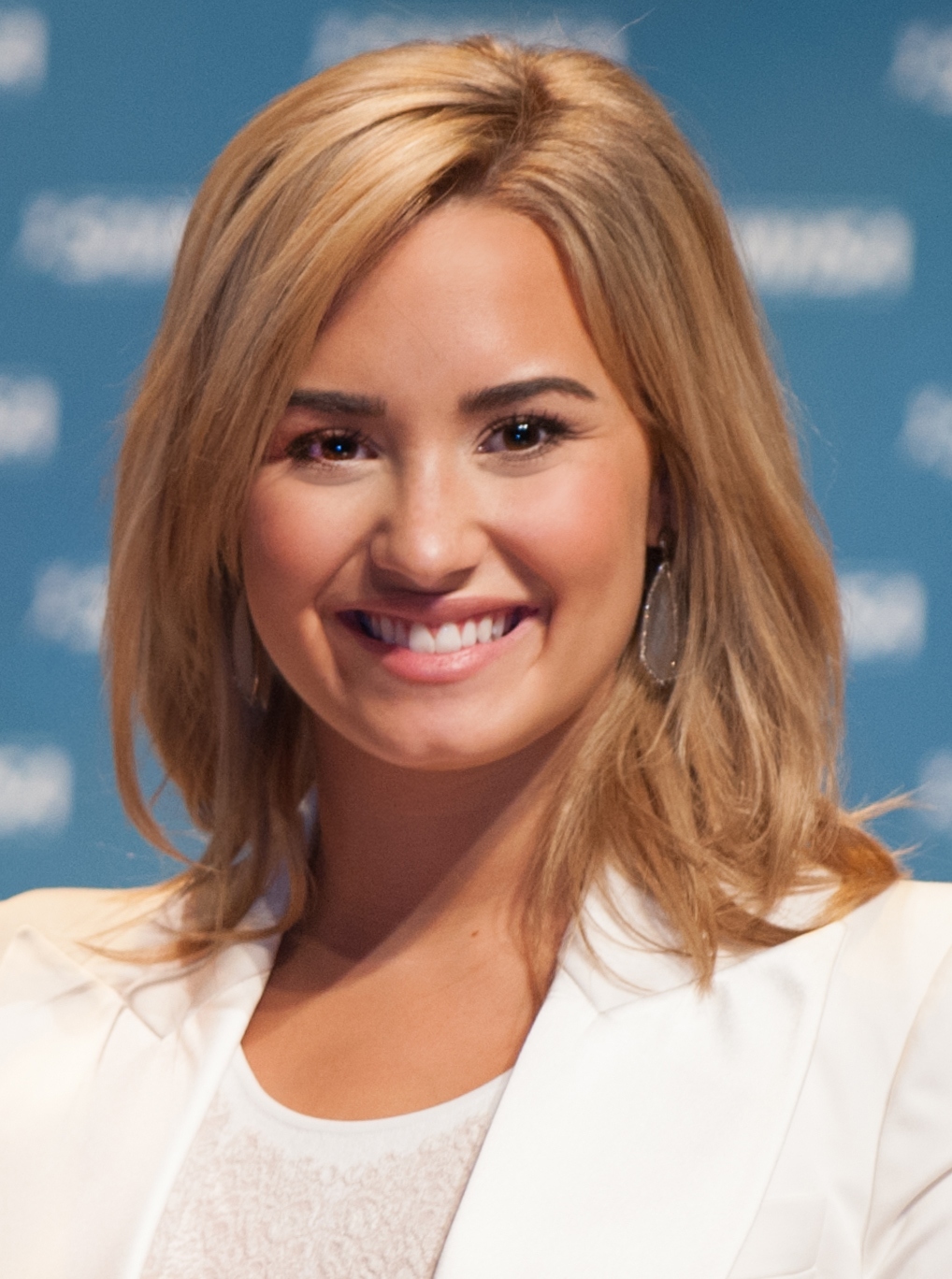
Lovato at the Substance Abuse and Mental Health Services Administration (SAMHSA)'s National Children's Mental Health Awareness Day in May 2013

Lovato has also raised awareness for health and mental health issues. For her efforts to fight mental health stigma, she was honored with the Artistic Award of Courage by The Jane and Terry Semel Institute. In May 2009, Lovato was named an Honorary Ambassador of Education by the American Partnership For Eosinophilic Disorders. In December 2011, Lovato condemned the Disney Channel for airing episodes of Shake It Up and So Random! in which characters joked about eating disorders. The network subsequently issued an apology and removed the episodes from their broadcast and video-on-demand services. In May 2013, she was cited for her dedication to mentoring teens and young adults with mental health problems at a National Children's Mental Health Awareness Day hosted by the Substance Abuse and Mental Health Services Administration in Washington. Lovato has paid treatment costs for mentally ill patients through the Lovato Treatment Scholarship Program, named for her late father, since 2013. Her speech at the 2016 Democratic National Convention focused on raising awareness for mental health. In September 2017, Lovato was named a Global Citizen ambassador for championing the mental health of thousands of children displaced within Iraq and other communities" and helped "fund the expansion of a Save the Children pilot program, Healing, and Education through the Arts, to violence-scarred young people living around Kirkuk and Saladin Governorate, Iraq". In April 2020, Lovato joined a mental health campaign in support of Irish charity SpunOut.i.e. to launch The Mental Health Fund which is raising money for mental health support.

Lovato identifies as a feminist. In a 2017 interview with Dolly magazine, she explained that "Feminism ... doesn't have to mean burning bras and hating men" but instead "standing up for gender equality and trying to empower our youth. And showing women that you can embrace your sexuality and you deserve to have confidence and you don't need to conform to society's views on what women should be or how you should dress. So, I think it is just about supporting other women and empowering other women." In May 2017, Lovato partnered with Fabletics to create a limited edition activewear collection for the United Nations Foundation's Girl Up campaign to fund programs for "the world's most marginalized adolescent girls".

Lovato is a vocal anti-bullying advocate. In October 2010, she served as spokesperson for the anti-bullying organization PACER and appeared on America's Next Top Model to speak out against bullying. Lovato participated in the "A Day Made Better" school advocacy campaign and has supported DonateMyDress.org, Kids Wish Network, Love Our Children USA, St. Jude Children's Research Hospital and City of Hope. In April 2012, she became a contributing editor of Seventeen magazine, describing her personal struggles to its female teenage readers. In September 2012, Lovato was named the ambassador of Mean Stinks, a campaign focused on eliminating bullying by girls.

Lovato is politically active, often speaking out against gun violence and racial injustice. In January 2010, she was featured in a public-service announcement for Voto Latino to promote the organization's "Be Counted" campaign ahead of the 2010 United States census. In June 2016, Lovato signed an open letter from Billboard urging gun reform and performed at the March for Our Lives anti-gun violence rally in Washington, D.C. in March 2018. In May 2020, Lovato condemned police brutality and the officers responsible for the murder of George Floyd and the shooting of Breonna Taylor. She shared resources to support the Black Lives Matter movement and black-owned businesses and denounced white privilege.

Throughout her career, Lovato has donated to and partnered with various charities. In 2009, she recorded the theme song "Send It On" with the Jonas Brothers, Miley Cyrus, and Selena Gomez for Disney's Friends for Change program. The song debuted on the Billboard Hot 100 at number 20, and its proceeds were directed to environmental charities through the Disney Worldwide Conservation Fund. Lovato and Joe Jonas recorded the song "Make a Wave" for the charity in March 2010. In August 2013, she traveled to Kenya for her 21st birthday to participate in a program of the international charity organization Free the Children. She returned to Kenya in January 2017 with We Movement to work with women and children. In March 2017, as a celebration of her five-year anniversary of sobriety, Lovato donated money to Los Angeles-based charities specializing in animal, LGBT, and adoption rights. In August 2017, Lovato donated $50000 to Hurricane Harvey relief and started fund with Nick Jonas, DNCE, and her then-manager Phil McIntyre. Lovato's second limited edition activewear collection with Fabletics, released in June 2020, pledged up to $125,000 in proceeds to COVID-19 pandemic relief efforts. As spokesperson for the Join the Surge Campaign, DoSomething.Org, and Joining the Surge by Clean & Clear, she has encouraged fans to take action in their own communities.

In September 2021, Lovato performed at the Greek Theatre in Los Angeles to raise awareness of the different crises that the world is going through and promote global unity, as part of the Global Citizen Live organization. In December 2023, Lovato voiced her support for United Nations Human Rights' climate change campaign, urging leaders to work towards climate justice, in tandem with the COP28 conference. Lovato and Chris McCarty, founder of nonprofit Quit Clicking Kids, advocated for protection of child performers' compensation, which was documented in the documentary Child Star (2024). She told CNN that taking issues related to child performers' agency to the United States Capitol "is the goal". On September 26, 2024, Lovato joined governor of California Gavin Newsom as he signed two bills into law that expand on the Coogan Law and offer new financial protections to child digital content creators. She described the legislation as "essentially the Coogan Law for the digital age". In October 2024, Lovato performed at the Children's Hospital Los Angeles Gala, which raises funds to support the hospital.

=== Products and endorsements ===
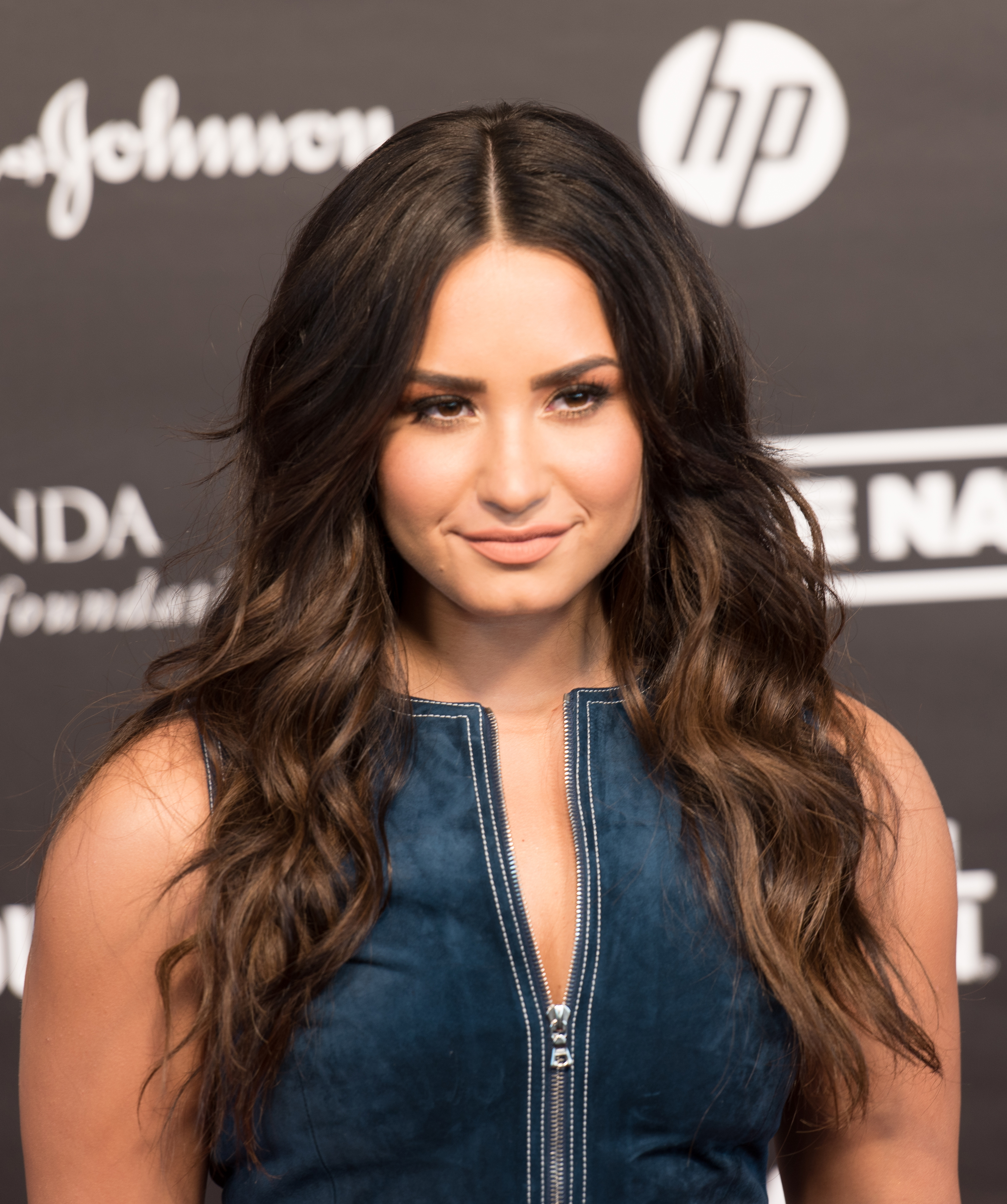
Lovato at the Global Citizen Festival in Hamburg in July 2017

From 2014 to 2016, Lovato was the face of the Skechers footwear brand. She partnered with Shazam on the Demi World Tour in 2014. Lovato launched her skincare line Devonne by Demi in December of the same year. In addition, she became the first-ever brand ambassador of the makeup brand N.Y.C. New York Color in 2015. That year, Lovato promoted The Radiant Collection for Tampax for "empowering females of all ages to stay fearless and wear what they want anytime of the month." In June 2016, Lovato partnered with streaming service Tidal to livestream the first date of her Future Now Tour with Nick Jonas. Since 2017, Lovato has released activewear collections with the women's athleisure brand Fabletics to raise money for organizations such as United Nations Foundation's Girl Up campaign and COVID-19 relief efforts. Also in 2017, she performed at a dinner hosted by the jewelry company Bulgari to celebrate the opening of the brand's Fifth Avenue flagship store in New York City.

Lovato became a brand ambassador for the JBL audio company in 2017 and for the mug company Ember in 2018. That year, she starred in CORE Hydration's "Finding Balance" campaign; she had become an initial investor of CORE Hydration after first discovering the brand in 2015. Jaguar, JBL, Lyft, Ferrari, TikTok and Samsung products have been featured in Lovato's music videos. She also appeared in commercials for Skechers, Acuvue, Apple, and Fabletics. In 2019, Dior used Lovato's song "Only Forever" from the album Tell Me You Love Me in a series of commercials and social media posts to promote the brand's "Dior Forever" makeup collection; the brand later used Lovato's song "Confident" in March 2021 to promote a new "Dior Forever" foundation in a series of social media campaigns. Since September 2020, Lovato has served as a Mental Health Spokesperson for the online and mobile therapy company Talkspace. In November 2021, Lovato announced the launch of her own vibrator, named Demi Wand, in partnership with Bellesa. The same month, she became Gaia, Inc.'s first celebrity ambassador; this endorsement attracted criticism from fans and the media due to the contents of the platform, which are widely described as promoting conspiracy theories. In March 2024, Lovato became a brand ambassador for and celebrity partner of Xeomin, a neurotoxic injectable filler by Merz Aesthetics. In July, she released a song on TikTok, titled "OG Anthem", for haircare brand OGX's "OG Who? OGX" campaign.

== Achievements ==
Lovato has won an MTV Video Music Award, a Guinness World Record, an iHeartRadio Much Music Video Award, two Latin American Music Awards, and five People's Choice Awards. (Note: Adapted from List of awards and nominations received by Demi Lovato.) For her work in music, she was nominated for two Grammy Awards, an American Music Award, four Billboard Music Awards, and three Brit Awards. With 14 wins, Lovato is the eighth-most-awarded solo artist at the Teen Choice Awards. She topped the 2013 list of The New York Times Best Selling Authors. In 2015, Lovato was honored with the Rulebreaker Award at the Billboard Women in Music event. In 2016, for her activism in the LGBT rights movement, she was awarded a GLAAD Vanguard Award at the 27th GLAAD Media Awards. That year, she was named to Forbes' 30 Under 30 list in the music category. Time included Lovato on its annual list of the 100 most influential people in 2017. Billboard ranked her as one of the most successful artists of the 2010s decade in 2019, and at number 52 on its 2025 "Top 100 Women Artists of the 21st Century" list. In 2012, Lovato became the youngest X Factor judge in the show's history. She is the eleventh most-followed musician on Instagram with over 153 million followers on this platform, and the tenth most-followed musician on Twitter with over 53 million followers on this platform.

According to Billboard, Lovato sold over 24 million records in the United States. In 2009, when she was 16, her album Here We Go Again debuted atop the Billboard 200, making her one of the eleven artists of all time who topped the chart before turning 18. Lovato has released nine studio albums, all of which charted in the top-ten of the Billboard 200, with four receiving Platinum certifications from the Recording Industry Association of America (RIAA) and two being certified Gold. She has four top-ten songs on the Billboard Hot 100. Two of Lovato's songs and music videos have reached more than one billion streams and views on Spotify and YouTube. As of May 2025, Lovato has sold over 30 million records worldwide.

== Filmography ==
- Camp Rock (2008)
- Jonas Brothers: The 3D Concert Experience (2009)
- Princess Protection Program (2009)
- Camp Rock 2: The Final Jam (2010)
- Demi Lovato: Stay Strong (2012)
- Smurfs: The Lost Village (2017)
- Louder Together (2017)
- Demi Lovato: Simply Complicated (2017)
- Charming (2018)
- Eurovision Song Contest: The Story of Fire Saga (2020)
- Demi Lovato: Dancing with the Devil (2021)
- Child Star (2024)
- Tow (2025)

== Discography ==
- Don't Forget (2008)
- Here We Go Again (2009)
- Unbroken (2011)
- Demi (2013)
- Confident (2015)
- Tell Me You Love Me (2017)
- Dancing with the Devil... the Art of Starting Over (2021)
- Holy Fvck (2022)
- It's Not That Deep (2025)

== Tours ==
Headlining

- Demi Lovato: Live in Concert (2009–2010)
- A Special Night with Demi Lovato (2011–2013)
- The Neon Lights Tour (2014)
- Demi World Tour (2014–2015)
- Tell Me You Love Me World Tour (2018)
- Holy Fvck Tour (2022)
- It's Not That Deep Tour (2026)

Co-headlining

- Future Now Tour (2016) (with Nick Jonas)

Promotional

- Demi Live! Warm Up Tour (2008)
- An Evening with Demi Lovato (2011)

Opening act

- Jonas Brothers – Burning Up Tour (2008)
- Avril Lavigne – The Best Damn Tour (2008)
- Jonas Brothers – Jonas Brothers World Tour (2009)
- Jonas Brothers – Live in Concert (2010)
- Enrique Iglesias – Sex and Love Tour (2014)

== Written works ==
=== Books ===
- Staying Strong: 365 Days a Year, Feiwel & Friends (November 19, 2013), ISBN 978-1-250-05144-8
- Staying Strong: A Journal, Feiwel & Friends (October 7, 2014), ISBN 978-1-250-06352-6
- One Plate at a Time: Recipes for Finding Freedom with Food (March 31, 2026), ISBN 978-1-250-39344-9

=== Authored articles ===
- Lovato, Demi (September 1, 2020). "Demi Lovato's Deeply Personal Letter on the Pandemic, Mental Health and Black Lives Matter". Vogue.
- Lovato, Demi (October 23, 2020). "A Conversation Between Senator Anne Ranch and Demi Lovato (and Danny DeVito)". Interview.

== See also ==
- History of Mexican Americans in Dallas–Fort Worth
- Honorific nicknames in popular music
- List of American Grammy Award winners and nominees
- List of artists who reached number one on the Billboard Mainstream Top 40 chart
- List of artists who reached number one on the U.S. Dance Club Songs chart
- List of wax figures displayed at Madame Tussauds museums
- The Bigg Chill
