= Madison De La Garza =

American actress (born 2001)

- Born: Madison Lee De La Garza; December 28, 2001 (age 24); Dallas, Texas, U.S.
- Occupation: Actress
- Years active: 2008–present
- Children: 1
- Relatives: Demi Lovato (half-sibling)

Madison Lee De La Garza (born December 28, 2001) is an American actress and filmmaker. De La Garza is known for playing Juanita Solis on Desperate Housewives. She is the younger half-sister of singer Demi Lovato.

== Early life and family ==
Madison Lee De La Garza was born to Ford dealership manager Eddie De La Garza and former country singer and Dallas Cowboys Cheerleader Dianna De La Garza (born Dianna Hart on August 8, 1962). Eddie is of Mexican descent. She has two older half siblings through Dianna's first marriage to Patrick Martin Lovato (1960–2013), Dallas Lovato (b. February 4, 1988) and Demi Lovato (b. August 20, 1992). She graduated from high school in June 2019 and enrolled in screenwriting at Chapman University.

== Career ==
De La Garza's most prominent role was Juanita Solis on Desperate Housewives. Additionally, she played a younger version of her half-sibling Demi Lovato's character Sonny Munroe in "Cookie Monsters", an episode of Sonny with a Chance.

De Le Garza has also played on Bad Teacher as Kelsey, a recurring role in the series. She co-directed Pink Elephant, a short film, and wrote, produced, and acted in the short Subject 16. She appeared on the Millennial Hollywood podcast to discuss Subject 16. De La Garza has a YouTube channel.

In July 2021, Variety reported De La Garza was slated to direct Surprise, a "mystery thriller about a surprise Zoom party that turns tense when the birthday girl's friends appear to know something she doesn't." The film was to star other YouTube influencers and personalities. The film premiered on YouTube on April 1, 2023.

== Personal life ==
On September 5, 2024, De La Garza announced that she was expecting her first child with her boyfriend, actor Ryan Mitchell. The following month, De La Garza announced that on September 27, 2024, she underwent an emergency Caesarean section and that their daughter Xiomara did not survive.

== Filmography ==
=== Film ===
==== Acting roles ====
Year	Title	Role	Notes
2016	Caged No More	Constanza	
2017	Demi Lovato: Simply Complicated	Herself	Documentary film
2017	Gnome Alone	Tiffany / Chelsea	Voice
2018	Subject 16	Sophia	Short film; also wrote and produced
2024	Child Star	Herself	Documentary film

==== As director ====
Year	Title	Notes
2020	Pink Elephant	Co-directed with Madeleine Noel Murden
2023	Surprise	

=== Television ===
Year	Title	Role	Notes
2008	Jonas Brothers: Living the Dream	Herself	Episode: "Rockstars in Training"
2008–2012	Desperate Housewives	Juanita Solis	Recurring role (Seasons 5–7); Main role (Season 8)
2009	Sonny with a Chance	Young Sonny Munroe	Episode: "Cookie Monsters"
2009	Princess Protection Program	Camera Girl	Television film
2012	Demi Lovato: Stay Strong	Herself	Television documentary
2014	Good Luck Charlie	Zoe	Episode: "Accepted"
2014	Bad Teacher	Kelsey	Recurring role
2017	American Koko	Heidi	Episodes: "There's No Going Back" and "Baptist Church"
2021	Demi Lovato: Dancing with the Devil	Herself	YouTube documentary series

=== Web ===
Year	Title	Role	Notes
2009	KSM: Read Between the Lines	Herself	Episode: "Backstage Pass"; cameo appearance
2014–2015	Muertoons	Bibi	Voice; Main role
