= SuChin Pak =

Korean American journalist

- 박수진
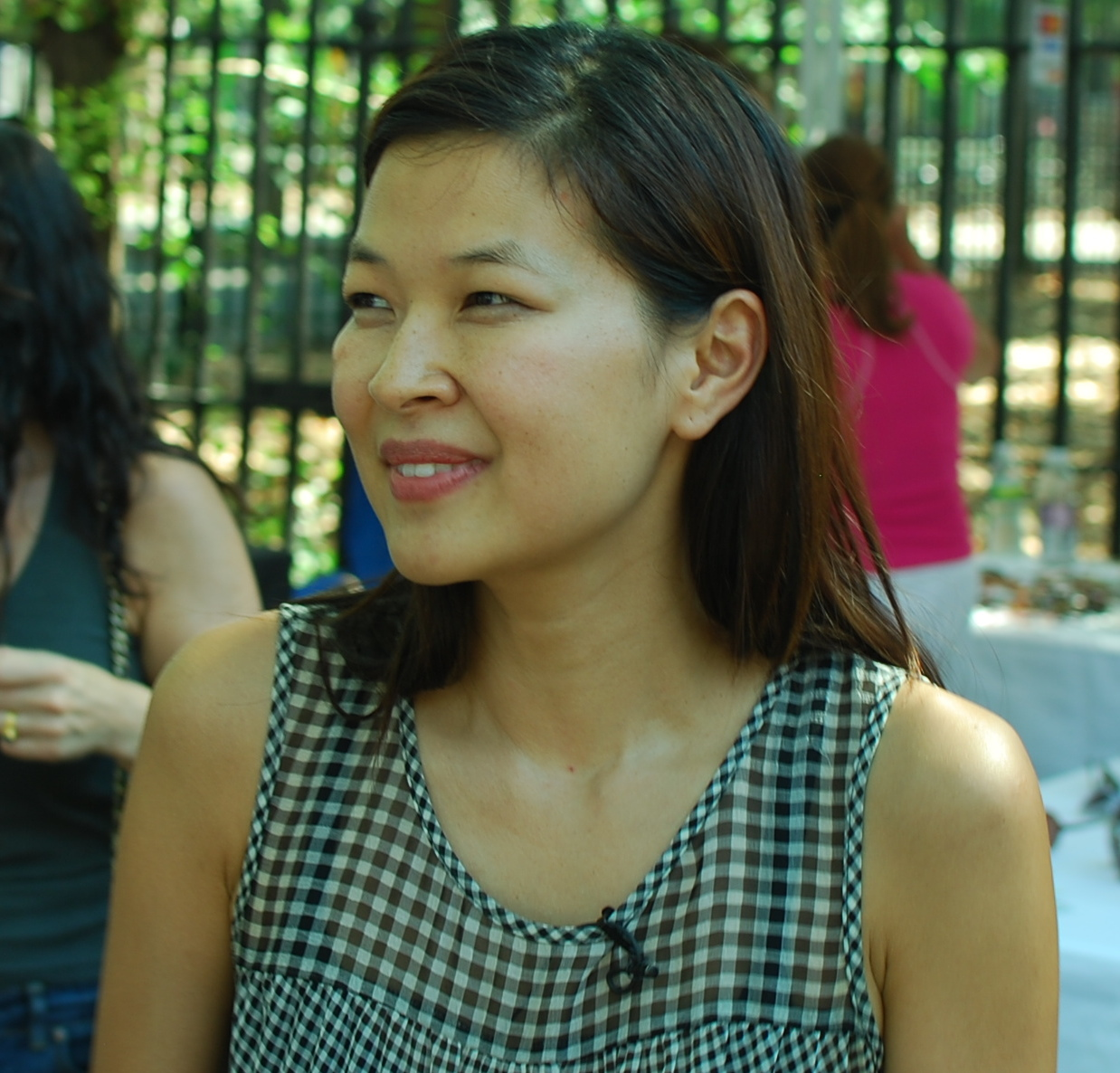
- Pak in 2010
- Born: August 15, 1976 (age 50); Seoul, South Korea
- Education: University of California Berkeley
- Occupations: Television presenter; podcaster; writer; journalist
- Known for: Podcaster, Former MTV News reporter
- Spouse: Mike Bender (m. 2012)
- Children: 2

SuChin Pak (Korean: 박수진, born August 15, 1976) is a South Korean-born American television news correspondent and podcaster, best known from her early days working for MTV News. She joined MTV News as a correspondent in May 2001. From 2021 to 2023, she resumed her role as narrator for MTV Cribs.

== Life and career ==
Born in Seoul, South Korea, Pak immigrated along with her parents to California when she was five years old. She grew up in Union City, California, a suburb southeast of San Francisco. Her parents own a small restaurant in downtown Oakland, California.

Pak never planned on a career in television. While attending James Logan High School, she volunteered for the YMCA program Youth and Government, an organization aimed at involving and educating young people in the political process. She was also a member of the school's forensics team, in which she did expository speaking. In 1992, she placed 8th in the state of California. She was interviewed for the news by KGO-TV, the ABC affiliate in San Francisco for the show Straight Talk 'N Teens. The program director for another station happened to see the piece and approached her to host the teen-based magazine show First Cut on KRON, the then-NBC (now MyNetwork TV) affiliate in San Francisco. This "after-school job" became Pak's introduction to the entertainment world. Her first big interview for the show was Ice-T.

While attending the University of California, Berkeley as a political science major, Pak was once again discovered, when the producer of a PBS science show called Newton's Apple saw a tape of her. Following graduation, she was approached by ZDTV, a cable network devoted to technology and the Internet. After a year working on Internet Tonight, a daily half-hour show at ZDTV, she was recruited to be a correspondent on KRON. Looking to move on from San Francisco, she sent in a tape to the start-up cable network Oxygen. After a year-long audition process, she was hired as a host for the show Trackers and moved to New York City. From there, MTV spotted her and she was soon the first Asian face of MTV.

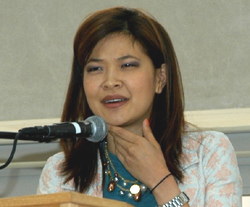
Pak speaking at an Asian Pacific American Heritage Month celebration, September 2005

She has covered the MTV Movie Awards, the Sundance Film Festival, and the MTV Video Music Awards. She also co-hosted, with Kurt Loder, MTV's pre-Grammy show. As a correspondent for "MTV Daily News", she has interviewed Mariah Carey, *NSYNC, P. Diddy, George Lucas, Jane's Addiction, Mary J. Blige, Billy Idol, and Fred Durst. On March 6, 2012, she hosted Demi Lovato: Stay Strong — The After Show. Pak hosted her own MTV documentary about multicultural young people called My Life (Translated). She narrated later seasons of MTV Cribs and True Life.

In 2007, she appeared on The Oprah Winfrey Show, revealing that she has struggled with confidence and beauty issues for many years. She mainly spoke about her epicanthal folds, and explained how her family and other Asians believe a double eyelid is crucial to beauty. She also mentioned how epicanthoplasty is the top form of plastic surgery being done in Asia.

In 2008, Pak had left MTV News for Planet Green to host G Word, which is co-hosted by Daniel Sieberg. In 2010, Pak returned to MTV News and hosted the VMAs Pre Show. Recently, Pak has been the host for the National Constitution Center's "The Exchange", a program in which high school students discuss their views on relevant constitutional issues.

In 2012, Pak was hired as the new on-air correspondent for DailyCandy, an email newsletter based in New York. In 2016, she co-hosted People's List, a weekly summer primetime infotainment series associated with People magazine on ABC.

In 2019, Pak served as the 'Tell All' host for season 3 of Sister Wives.

In October 2020, Pak was announced to be joining Lemonada Media's podcast slate as the co-host in the new show Add to Cart. The podcast launched on November 17, 2020 In 2021, Pak resumed her role as narrator of MTV Cribs.

== Personal life ==
Pak married Mike Bender, co-founder of AwkwardFamilyPhotos, on March 24, 2012. The couple have two children together, their first being a son born in 2012.
