= The Demi Lovato Show =

American talk show

- Genre: Talk show
- Directed by: Hannah Lux Davis
- Presented by: Demi Lovato
- Country of origin: United States
- Original language: English
- No. of seasons: 1
- No. of episodes: 9

Production
- Executive producers: Demi Lovato; Scooter Braun; J. D. Roth; Adam Greener; Allison Kaye; Scott Manson; Todd Yasui; Sara Hansemann
- Running time: 5–7 minutes
- Production companies: GoodStory Entertainment; SB Projects

Original release
- Network: The Roku Channel
- Release: July 30, 2021

The Demi Lovato Show is an American television talk show hosted by its namesake Demi Lovato. It premiered on July 30, 2021, on The Roku Channel.

== Premise ==
The Demi Lovato Show features candid conversations with special guests and covers topics including activism, feminism, gender identity, sex and body positivity, mental health and UFOs.

== Production ==
On February 6, 2020, Quibi announced a talk show Pillow Talk with Demi Lovato, to be hosted by Demi Lovato. Executive producers were expected to include Lovato, Scooter Braun, J. D. Roth, Allison Kaye, Scott Manson, and Adam Greener with Hannah Lux Davis was slated to direct. Production companies involved with the series were slated to consist of GoodStory Entertainment and Braun's SB Projects. In October 2020, Quibi announced its shutdown, raising questions about the future of the series.

In January 2021, Roku, Inc. acquired Quibi's programming and announced plans to release the series during that year. The show was later renamed to The Demi Lovato Show and was set to premiere on The Roku Channel on July 30, 2021. It was revealed that guests would include Lucy Hale, Jameela Jamil, YG, and Nikita Dragun.

== Episodes ==
No.	Featured guest(s)	Original release date
1	"Lucy Hale"	July 30, 2021
2	"Olivia Munn"	July 30, 2021
3	"YG"	July 30, 2021
4	"Nikita Dragun"	July 30, 2021
5	"Jameela Jamil"	July 30, 2021
6	"Jay Shetty"	July 30, 2021
7	"Steven M. Greer"	July 30, 2021
8	"Elyse Resch"	July 30, 2021
9	"Matthew Scott Montgomery and Sirah"	July 30, 2021
