= Demi Lovato: Simply Complicated =

- Film poster
- Directed by: Hannah Lux Davis
- Produced by: Sean Cooley; Jamee Ranta
- Starring: Demi Lovato
- Cinematography: Carlos Veron
- Edited by: Grant MacDowell
- Music by: Demitri Lerios; Michael Lerios
- Production company: Philymack Productions
- Distributed by: YouTube
- Release date: October 17, 2017
- Running time: 78 minutes
- Country: United States
- Language: English

This past year has been one of the most transformative years of my life, and I’m looking forward to bringing my fans on this journey of continued growth and self-discovery in both my music and my personal experiences.”

— Lovato on the documentary.

Demi Lovato: Simply Complicated is a 2017 documentary film about the life and career of American singer, songwriter, and actor Demi Lovato, released on YouTube on October 17, 2017 in support of her sixth studio album Tell Me You Love Me. A director's cut of the documentary including 10 minutes of additional footage was later released on YouTube Premium in December 2017.

Simply Complicated chronicles both the recording of Tell Me You Love Me as well as events in Lovato's life and career that she had not previously disclosed or discussed extensively, including the beginning of her career on Disney Channel and various personal struggles with mental health and addiction. Lovato also admitted to being dishonest about the initial outcome of her recovery in a previous documentary, Demi Lovato: Stay Strong (2012), and revealed she was in fact under the influence of cocaine while being interviewed about her sobriety for that film.

== Synopsis ==
Simply Complicated follows the recording of Lovato's sixth studio album Tell Me You Love Me and features appearances and commentary by several music producers, including Mitch Allan and Oak Felder. The documentary also chronicles Lovato's life and career up until 2017, including her upbringing and early career as a child star on Barney & Friends and later as a teenager on Disney Channel, as well as her first stint in rehab in 2010 for an eating disorder and emotional issues and her subsequent struggles with bipolar disorder (Note: In 2021, Lovato said that her bipolar diagnosis was inaccurate and that it had been revised to attention deficit hyperactivity disorder (ADHD).) and addiction. Lovato's mother Dianna De La Garza and sisters Dallas Lovato and Madison De La Garza also appear, discussing Lovato's talent from an early age as well as her biological father, who was abusive and suffered from alcoholism and substance abuse. The film also features appearances and commentary from Lovato's manager and life coach at the time, Phil McIntyre and Mike Bayer.

== Awards and nominations ==
The film was nominated at 2018 MTV Movie & TV Awards as Best Music Documentary. The film was also nominated at the 2019 Realscreen Awards for Non-Fiction: Arts & Culture.
