= National Children's Mental Health Awareness Week =

National Children's Mental Health Awareness Week is the official United States national awareness event, headed annually by the National Federation of Families for Children's Mental Health.

== Green Ribbon Campaign ==
Each year, beginning in January and running into the first full week of May (National Children's Mental Health Awareness Week), the National Federation runs their Green Ribbon Campaign. Started in mid-2005, this fundraising initiative aims to raise awareness of children's mental health issues and educate the general public on the needs of children with emotional, behavioral, or mental health needs and their families. Green ribbons, symbolizing the cause, as well as green lapel pins are sold and distributed to its membership base with the message for these individuals to wear them during National Children's Mental Health Awareness Week to help spread the cause wide and far. The Green Ribbon Campaign has proven to be very successful with 75,000 ribbons being distributed in 2012. For 2013, green ribbons and lapels pins are being sold and distributed through their National Children's Mental Health Awareness Portal.

== Legislative Briefing ==
For the past few years, the National Federation of Families has held a legislative briefing, done in partnership with the American Academy of Child and Adolescent Psychiatry and Mental Health America. These briefings, usually held on National Children's Mental Health Awareness Day (a separate day, held by SAMHSA that falls during National Children's Mental Health Awareness Week), aim to educate and make aware to legislators the issues facing children with emotional, behavioral, or mental health needs and their families so that change can be made at the national level to help support these individuals. The legislative briefing is held in downtown Washington D.C., usually in the United States House of Representatives or United States Senate buildings.
