= Demi Lovato: Stay Strong =

2012 documentary film

- Promotional poster
- Genre: Documentary
- Directed by: Davi Russo
- Starring: Demi Lovato
- Country of origin: United States
- Original language: English

Production
- Producers: Samantha Storr; Dave Sirulnick; Justin Wilkes; Jonathan Mussman
- Running time: 42 minutes

Original release
- Network: MTV
- Release: March 6, 2012

Demi Lovato: Stay Strong is a 2012 documentary film about American singer Demi Lovato which follows her recovery after leaving rehab and her return to the music industry after abruptly cancelling her tour with the Jonas Brothers, putting her career on a hiatus in order to seek treatment.

It premiered on March 6, 2012 on MTV with 848,000 viewers.

Several years later in her YouTube documentary about her life and career, Demi Lovato: Simply Complicated (2017), Lovato admitted to being dishonest about the outcome of her initial treatment in Demi Lovato: Stay Strong, and also revealed that she was in fact under the influence of cocaine while being interviewed about her sobriety for the documentary film.

== Background and production ==
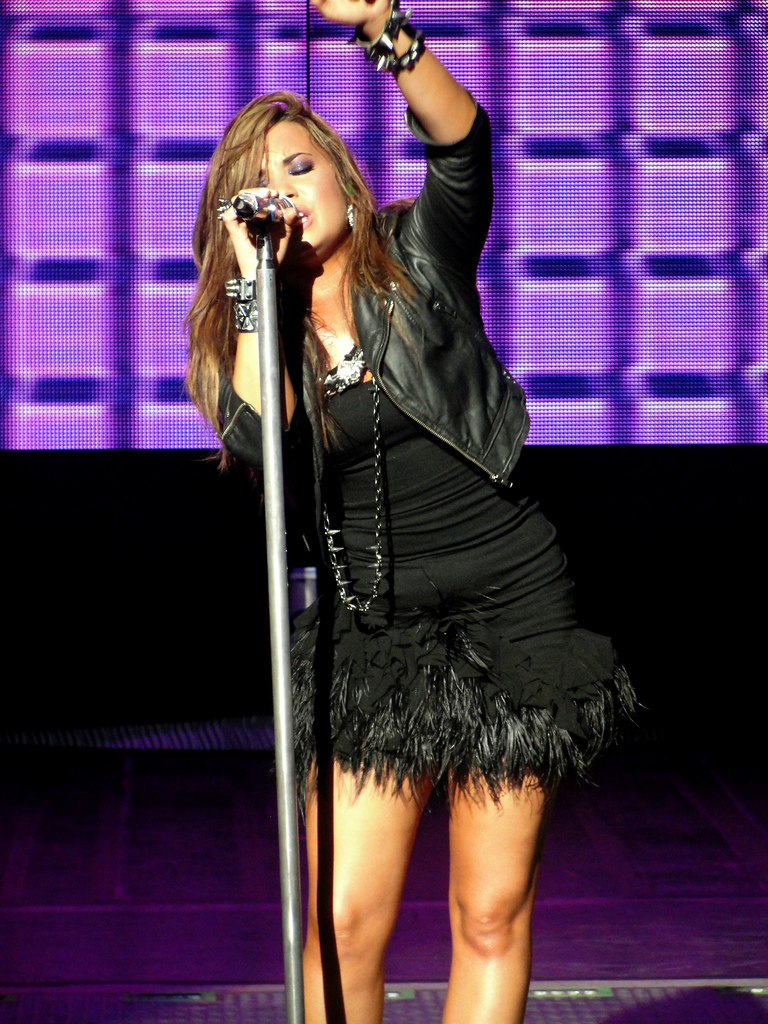
Lovato performing during the Jonas Brothers: Live in Concert in September 2010, about two months before the singer abruptly withdrew from the tour.

Lovato had suffered from depression, an eating disorder, self-harm and being bullied before she went into rehab at the age of 18. On November 1, 2010, she left the Jonas Brothers: Live in Concert, entering a treatment facility for "physical and emotional issues." She decided to enter treatment after punching female dancer Alex Welch; her management and family confronted her in a formal intervention after this incident to convince her she needed help. Lovato agreed to seek help and took "full responsibility" for the incident.

On January 28, 2011, Lovato completed inpatient treatment at Timberline Knolls and returned home. She acknowledged that she had suffered from anorexia and bulimia, had harmed themself, and had been "self-medicating" with drugs and alcohol "like a lot of teens do to numb their pain." In addition, Lovato said that she "basically had a nervous breakdown" and was diagnosed with bipolar disorder during her treatment. (Note: In 2021, Lovato said that her bipolar diagnosis was inaccurate and that it had been revised to attention deficit hyperactivity disorder (ADHD).) Lovato later added that she had used cocaine several times a day and smuggled cocaine onto airplanes. After finishing her treatment, Lovato returned to work on her third album in February 2011. In April 2011, Lovato announced she was leaving Sonny with a Chance, where she portrayed the main character Sonny Munroe, because she wanted to focus on her music career rather than acting.

Lovato's third album, Unbroken, was released on September 20, 2011 and was met with mixed to positive reviews from music critics. It debuted at number four on the Billboard 200 and was eventually certified Gold. The R&B-infused album was preceded by Lovato's critically acclaimed top ten single "Skyscraper" and spawned the triple-platinum certified hit single "Give Your Heart a Break." On February 21, 2012, Lovato announced on Twitter that a television special she had worked on with MTV would premiere on March 6, 2012, while she also revealed its title #StayStrong and the promotional poster for the documentary, showing Lovato's "Stay Strong" wrist tattoos as well as her scars. An official trailer was released by MTV on the same day.

== Synopsis ==
"I don't think I'm fixed. People think that you're like a car in a body shop. You go in, they fix you, and you're out. ... It takes constant fixing."

— Lovato describing her path to recovery.

Demi Lovato: Stay Strong commences with fans shouting Lovato's first name while waiting for her to arrive at the Fox Theatre in Detroit where she is about to perform on November 16, 2011. The tour date marks the opening night of the Unbroken Tour and her first tour date since the sold-out An Evening with Demi Lovato two-date promotional tour that took place in September 2011. Lovato starts reflecting on the rough road that led her to self-harm and addiction, while scenes of Lovato getting ready for her performance in the dressing room are interwoven featuring a short cameo appearance from her former manager Phil McIntyre. She says she "had so many issues underneath that needed to be taken care of" and that "it literally ended up driving [her] insane." Shortly after, Lovato's home in Los Angeles is shown where she is seen hugging her mother Dianna De La Garza, while Lovato's half-sister Madison De La Garza is also featured.

As soon as Lovato's makeup and hair are done, she is ready to go on stage and a huge audience is seen cheering for her. Lovato confesses, "I cannot tell you that I have not thrown up since treatment. I cannot tell you I've not cut myself since treatment. I'm not perfect. This is a daily battle that I will face for the rest of my life." She is then seen performing the track "All Night Long." Lovato reveals that her new, bigger purpose in life is to "inspire people," and "get people through their days and their problems." Some interviewed fans express what they think about Lovato's recovery and how she is an inspiration to them, while praising her strength.

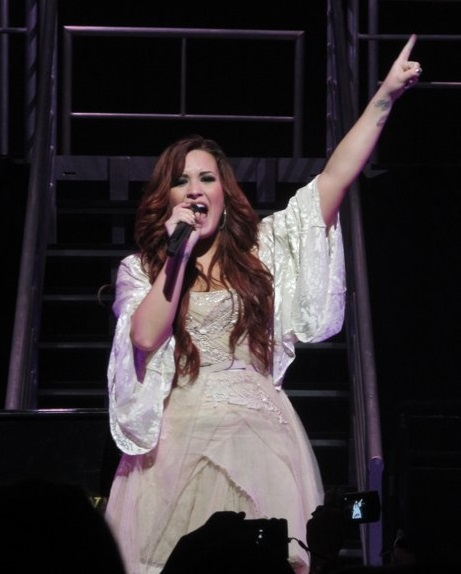
Lovato performing in the dress she wore when she let the "special" fan on stage, December 2011

The cameras follow Lovato to her childhood home, where she spends her first Thanksgiving out of treatment and explains how her eating disorder had developed. "This year I am definitely not taking any holiday for granted," she says about spending Thanksgiving with her family. After Thanksgiving, Lovato keeps thinking about what she ate on the holiday, cries about it and feels uncomfortable before going on stage. She feels sick but still decides to perform. A small part of her performance of the song "Fix a Heart" is shown, as well as Lovato taking pictures with fans at her meet-and-greet.

One of her fans, a young girl named Sanah Jivani with Alopecia, tells Lovato that she inspired her to go to the meet-and-greet without her wig. Sitting in front of the piano on stage, Lovato expresses how thankful she is to be there, "because not long ago I was in a treatment facility" and she "was so scared and was so alone but I had you guys [the fans] by my side." She mentions the "beautiful, beautiful girl that I met," tells the audience why the girl went to the concert without her wig, and states, "That's why I continue to do this [performing] every single day of my life no matter how hard it gets." The singer adds, "It's the people sitting in this audience and the strength that you guys possess, so just keep inspiring people 'cause you're inspiring me to stay so strong til this day. So, thank you," and starts singing her song "Together" while letting the special girl join her on stage to perform a duet. Sanah Jivani, the young girl who performed the duet with Lovato is the founder and CEO of a non-profit called The Love Your Natural Self Foundation and draws much of her inspiration for her organization from this moment. This was a meaningful moment for both Lovato and the fan.

The singer revisits Timberline Knolls, the treatment facility in Lemont, Illinois she entered back in 2010, for the first time since she was released in mid-January 2011. Lovato recalls on her way to Timberline Knolls, "The first time that I walked into Timberline Knolls, I sat there to eat my first meal, and it was chicken, rice, vegetables, and milk, and I took like two or three bites of the chicken and was like 'OK, I'm done,'" adding, "That's when I realized maybe I do belong here because I can't finish a meal." She confesses about the room she stayed in during her treatment, "I got so completely vulnerable and so raw, when I even step into this room I feel naked." Showing her wrist tattoos, she reveals how meaningful they are to her and she did not get them just to cover up the scars she had, but also because her fans kept encouraging her to stay strong while in rehab.

"I wish that every single person here could just live in freedom," Lovato tells the patients at Timberline Knolls while delivering a speech. It was at Timberline Knolls where she was first diagnosed with bipolar disorder. She admits that she didn't realize that she was ill before her treatment and used to assume that "writing seven songs in one night was normal." Bringing her guitarist and friend Mike Manning with her, Lovato gives an intimate acoustic performance of her empowering hit song "Skyscraper" after her speech and gets emotional, saying "Utilize your time here, 'cause this place will change your life, 'cause it changed mine."

Lovato opens up about how she realized that she could use her experience in the treatment center "for the better." Instead of keeping her struggles and demons to herself, she decided to share her story with the world "because some people need to hear it." She wanted to inspire others with her story and prove that no matter what people are going through at the moment, they will get through it. The acoustic "Skyscraper" rendition at Timberline Knolls flows into a piano-driven performance of the song at a concert venue and Lovato is seen going into the crowd. The singer and her crew dance to "B.M.F." by Rick Ross in their tour bus after the concert while she acknowledges that "recovery doesn't have a day off."

== Promotion ==
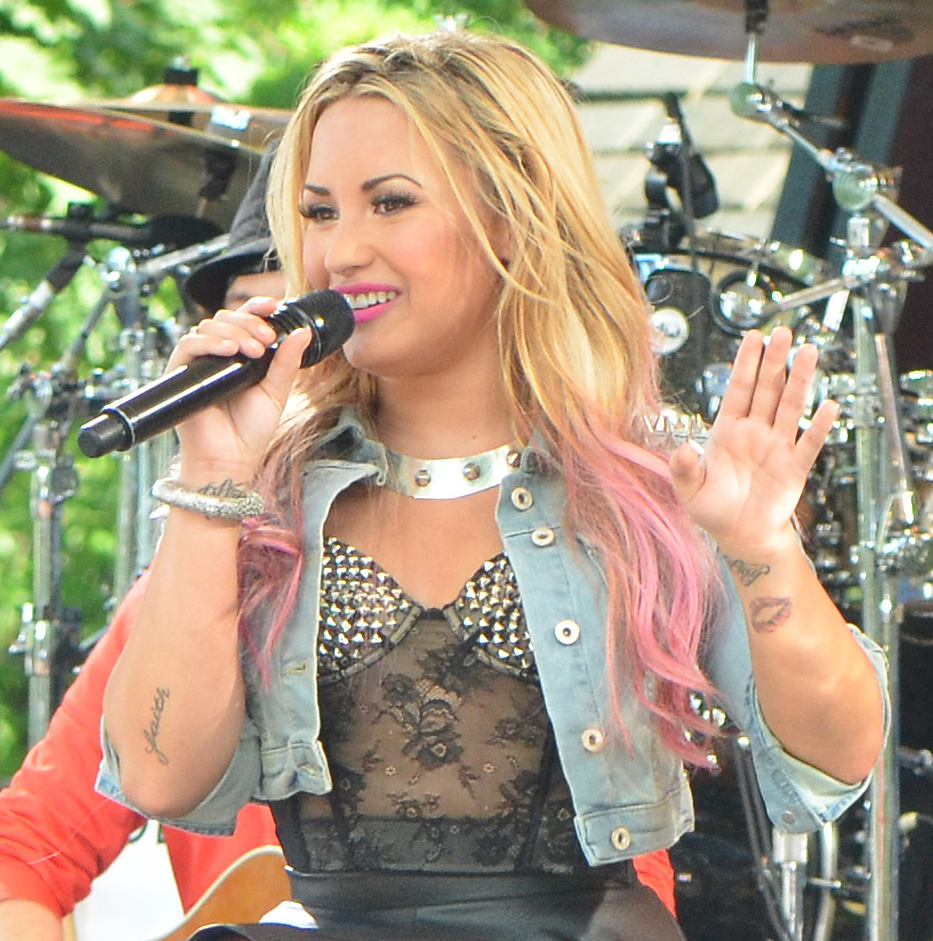
Lovato performing on Good Morning America in July 2012 as part of their Summer Concert Series.

On the morning of March 6, 2012, Lovato made an appearance on The Today Show to promote the documentary which would premiere on MTV that night. She performed her single "Give Your Heart a Break." "I've decided to tell my story because there are a lot of young teens, girls and boys, that are dealing with the same issues that I've been through. If I'm able to use my voice to do good in the world then I definitely want to do that," she told Today anchor Ann Curry.

After the documentary film was premiered, Lovato immediately appeared on Demi Lovato: Stay Strong — The After Show in order to react to her documentary and do a special question-and-answer session. The show, hosted by MTV's SuChin Pak, was broadcast live from the MTV Studios in Times Square. Fans could participate in the conversation on Twitter by tweeting the hashtag #StayStrong and ask Lovato questions by using the hashtag #AskDemi. "It feels really awesome. Doing the documentary was so interesting," she shared when talking about how she felt after releasing the documentary. She added, "I felt really vulnerable, and I still kind of do tonight. I wouldn't change it. I'm doing awesome right now. I'm living a really healthy lifestyle. It's not easy. I struggle. But each day gets easier." Lovato announced during the post-show that she would have an upcoming appearance in Punk'd.

The after show also featured some unaired extra footage. In the extra footage the singer explains every story behind her tattoos, including the reason why she got the signature heart from the Here We Go Again cover art tattooed on her wrist. She states that she sees it as a unique connection with her fans who "would draw it on their wrists every day" until she left treatment. Several fans featured in cameos raise their voices praising Lovato for being an anti-bullying advocate. Lovato says that people can make a difference by speaking up when she experiences or witnesses bullying and admits that she was bullied herself, but expresses that she does not care about what haters think about her.
