= Michael D. Ratner =

American film producer (born 1989)

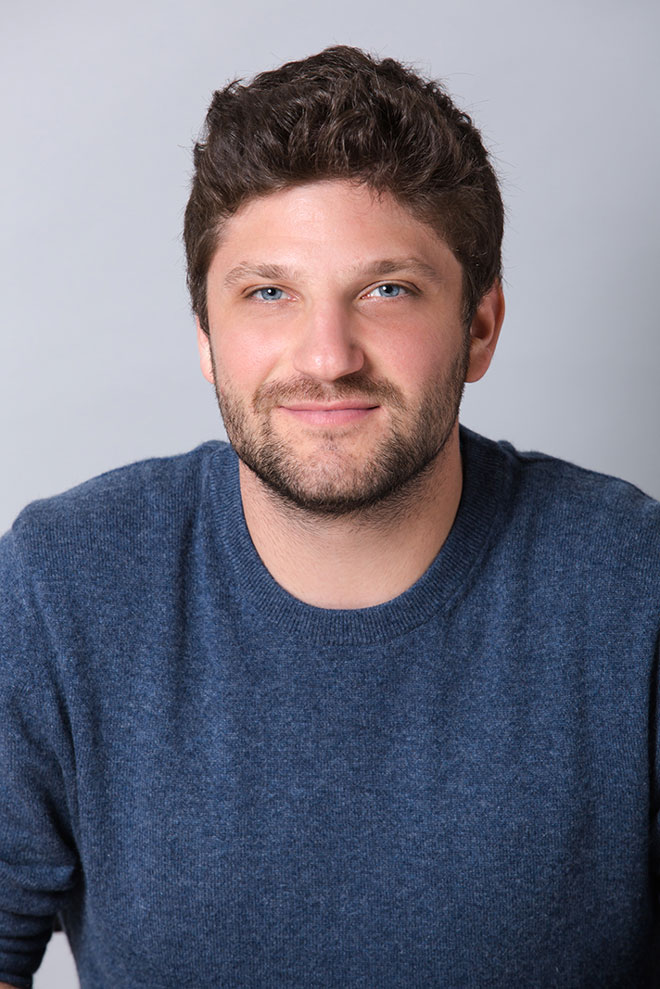
- Michael D. Ratner in 2020
- Born: July 11, 1989 (age 37); Long Island, New York, U.S.
- Education: University of Pennsylvania (B.A.); New York University Tisch School of the Arts (M.F.A.)
- Occupations: Entrepreneur; Filmmaker; Film Executive
- Spouse: Lauren Ratner (married 2022–present)

Michael D. Ratner (born July 11, 1989) is an American entrepreneur and film producer. He is the chief executive officer of OBB Media, a Los Angeles-based production studio he founded in 2016. Ratner is also a co-founder of Rhode, alongside his wife Lauren and Hailey Bieber.

Ratner is known for producing sports and entertainment digital video content. He has worked closely with Justin Bieber on several productions, including the music video for "Intentions", Seasons, and Our World. Other OBB productions include Demi Lovato: Dancing with the Devil, The Kid LAROI's Kids Are Growing Up: A Story About a Kid Named Laroi, Kevin Hart's Cold As Balls, and A Nonsense Christmas with Sabrina Carpenter.

== Early life and education ==
Ratner grew up in Long Island, New York. He studied acting at the Lee Strasberg Theatre and Film Institute. Ratner graduated from the University of Pennsylvania with a bachelor's degree in Film and English, and received a Master of Fine Arts degree in Film and Television from New York University's Tisch School of the Arts in 2014.

During his second year at Tisch, he interned at Relativity Media where he created short-form video content.

== Career ==
=== OBB ===
Ratner founded OBB Media in 2016.

In 2016, Ratner produced the documentary film Gonzo @ the Derby as part of ESPN's 30 for 30 series, marking OBB's first major deal. The film focuses on author Hunter S. Thompson's trip to the Kentucky Derby and was narrated by Sean Penn. Ratner also produced One in a Billion, which was acquired by Netflix.

The same year, Ratner partnered with Mandalay Sports Media to direct and co-produce sports-related projects. Ratner also served as co-chair of the NYU Tisch Gala 2016, which raised $2.1 million.

Ratner pitched to Lionsgate and Laugh Out Loud Productions for a show where Kevin Hart interviewed athletes while sitting in ice baths. The first seasons of the resulting show Cold as Balls was released in 2017, and has since become a multi-season franchise.

In 2019, Ratner served as Executive Producer and director for the comedy show Historical Roasts, which aired on Netflix.

In early 2020, Ratner directed and produced the docuseries Justin Bieber: Seasons, which became the most-watched YouTube premiere at the time of its release. This was followed by the Bieber music video Intentions, and a documentary follow-up Next Chapter, and Our World in 2021.

In March 2021, Ratner and Hailey Bieber partnered to create a YouTube channel featuring beauty tutorials, lifestyle tips, and mental health awareness videos. The series Who's In My Bathroom? became a viral success.

In April 2021, Ratner co-directed Demi Lovato: Dancing with the Devil. In July 2021, Ratner directed Inside Kylie Cosmetics, a mini-docuseries starring Kylie Jenner.

In 2022, Ratner announced a partnership with Kevin Hart to executive produce Storytown, a hip-hop animated series that would premiere on HBO Max.

Ratner directed the Spotify Billions Club: The Series, which won Best Social Video Series at the 2024 Webby Awards.

Ratner produced Kids Are Growing Up: A Story About A Kid Named LAROI which premiered on Prime Video in February 2024, chronicling the rise of The Kid LAROI.

=== Rhode ===
In 2022, Ratner co-founded Rhode, with Hailey Bieber after she had approached Ratner with the concept of a skincare line. Ratner serves as co-executive chairman. Rhode was acquired by e.l.f. in May 2025 in a $1 billion deal.

== Personal life ==
Ratner met Lauren Rothberg, a marketing entrepreneur while attending the University of Pennsylvania. They began dating in 2018, and the two married in Napa Valley in 2022. Their first daughter was born in December 2025.

== Filmography ==
=== Film ===
Year	Title	Type	Role	Network/Notes				
Year	Title	Type	Role	Network/Notes	2011	Supermilk	Short	Director, Writer, Producer
2014	Dwight Howard: In the Moment	Documentary	Executive Producer					
2014	The 30-Year-Old Bris	Short	Director, Writer, Producer					
2015	In Football We Trust	Documentary	Executive Producer					
2015	Mario Cuomo: More Than Words	Short	Director, Executive Producer, Writer					
2016	30 for 30: Gonzo @ The Derby	Short	Director and Executive Producer					
2016	Ride Along	Short	Director and Executive Producer					
2016	One in a Billion	Documentary	Executive Producer					
2017	Mini Marilyn	Short	Executive Producer					
2018	Comedy by Blake	TV Mini-Series	Director and Executive Producer					
2018	The 5th Quarter	TV Series	Creator, Director, Showrunner, Executive Producer					
2018–present	Cold as Balls	TV Series	Creator, Director, Showrunner, Executive Producer	Seasons 1–6; Ongoing; LOL Network				
2019	Can I Steal You for a Second?	TV Series	Executive Producer					
2019	Historical Roasts	TV Series	Director and Executive Producer					
2020	Justin Bieber feat. Quavo: Intentions	Music Video	Director and Executive Producer					
2020	Justin Bieber: Seasons	TV Series	Director and Executive Producer					
2020	A Season with the Memphis Tigers	TV Series	Executive Producer					
2020	&Music	TV Series	Director and Executive Producer					
2020	Justin Bieber: Next Chapter	Documentary Special	Director and Executive Producer					
2021	Demi Lovato: Dancing with the Devil	Documentary Series	Director and Executive Producer					
2021	Who's In My Bathroom? With Hailey Rhode Bieber	TV Series	Director and Executive Producer					
2021	Inside Kylie Cosmetics	Documentary Series	Director and Executive Producer					
2021	Justin Bieber: Our World	Documentary	Director and Executive Producer					
2021	Elton John: Inside the Lockdown Sessions	Documentary Feature	Executive Producer	Apple Music				
2021	Adele: The 30 Interview	TV Special	Executive Producer	Apple Music				
2022	The Game Plan With Shaquille O'Neal	TV Series	Executive Producer	TNT				
TBD	Storytown	Animation; TV Series	Executive Producer	HBO Max; In Development				

== Recognition ==
Ratner was recognized by Variety as one of Hollywood’s Creative New Leaders in 2018. He was named to Forbes’s 30 Under 30 2019 list for Hollywood & Entertainment. In 2023, Ratner was nominated for the Grammy Award for Best Music Film for his work on Our World.

== Awards and nominations ==
Year	Association	Award Category	Nomination	Result
2021	2021 MTV Movie & TV Awards	Best Music Documentary	Demi Lovato: Dancing with the Devil	Nominated
2021	SXSW	Official Selection - Opening Headliner	Demi Lovato: Dancing with the Devil	Nominated
2020	Streamy Awards	Sports	Cold as Balls	Nominated
2020	2020 MTV Video Music Awards	Best Pop Video	Intentions - Justin Bieber ft. Quavo	Nominated
2018	Streamy Awards	Sports	Cold as Balls	Won
2016	Tribeca Film Festival	Official Selection	Gonzo @ the Derby	Nominated
2014	Tribeca Film Festival	Official Selection	The 30 Year Old Bris	Nominated
