= Lauren Ratner =

American business executive

- Born: Lauren Rothberg
- Education: University of Pennsylvania (BA)
- Known for: Co-founder of Rhode
- Spouse: Michael D. Ratner (married 2022–present)

Lauren Ratner (née Rothberg) is an American business executive. She is president of Rhode, a skincare line co-founded with her husband Michael D. Ratner and Hailey Bieber.

== Early life and education ==
Ratner grew up in London. Between 2008 and 2012, she attended the University of Pennsylvania for a Bachelor of Arts in History.

== Career ==
Ratner joined Michael Kors in 2013. She later served as a Director of Marketing at Reformation between 2016 and 2019.

In 2020, Ratner co-founded Hailey Bieber’s skincare line Rhode. In December 2023, she was promoted to president and chief brand officer.

On May 28, 2025, Rhode was acquired by e.l.f. in a $1 billion deal. Ratner remained in a leadership role following the transaction.

== Personal life ==
She met Michael D. Ratner, an entertainment executive while attending the University of Pennsylvania. They began dating in 2018, and the two married in Napa Valley in 2022. Their first child was born in December 2025.

== Recognition ==
In 2020, Ratner was listed on the Forbes 30 Under 30.
