= 4D with Demi Lovato =

Podcast hosted by Demi Lovato

- Genre: LGBTQIA+ rights; LGBT culture; Body positivity; Mental health
- Format: Talk show; Interview podcast
- Language: English

Cast and voices
- Hosted by: Demi Lovato

Production
- Length: 25–53 minutes

Publication
- No. of episodes: 23
- Original release: May 19 – November 17, 2021
- Provider: Cadence13; OBB Media; SB Projects
- Updates: Weekly (Wednesday)

Reception
- Ratings: 3.9/5

Related
- Website: www.obbmedia.com/sound-2/4d-with-demi-lovato

4D with Demi Lovato is a podcast hosted by American singer Demi Lovato. Its first episode was released on May 19, 2021 and ended on November 17, 2021.

New episodes were released weekly, every Wednesday, for a total of 23 episodes, along with the accompanying video versions on Lovato's YouTube channel. In each episode, Lovato interviews special guests focusing on topics including mental health, LGBTQIA+ rights, equity and justice, body positivity, art, environment, and activism.

In its first episode, Lovato publicly came out as non-binary and announced her decision to change her gender pronouns to they/them, before talking about gender identity and non-binary community with author and performer Alok Vaid-Menon.

== Background ==
On March 30, 2021, Lovato announced via Twitter that she would release a podcast in partnership with Cadence13, OBB Media, and SB Projects. The podcast trailer was released on May 12, 2021, stating she would "share what's on her heart".

== Episodes ==
Episodes are released weekly, on Wednesdays. As of November 19, 2021, the podcast has aired 23 episodes.

No.	Title	Length	Original release date
1	"Alok Vaid-Menon"	36:21	May 19, 2021
Lovato delved into her journey to coming out as non-binary with author and performer Alok Vaid-Menon, explaining how Vaid-Menon and musician Sam Smith helped her to heal.
2	"Glennon Doyle"	41:08	May 26, 2021
Lovato discussed coming out, addiction, and the concept of happiness with author Glennon Doyle. She reflected on gender performance, her individual journeys toward recovery, and shared an intimate internal monologue she once told herself, that she would never be truly happy.
3	"Drew Barrymore"	37:33	June 2, 2021
Actor Drew Barrymore opened up about her experience as a child star in Hollywood and the two shared about rehabilitation experiences and addiction.
4	"Patricio Manuel"	38:41	June 9, 2021
Lovato and professional transgender boxer Patricio Manuel shared their journeys of finding their identities and to live out their truth everyday.
5	"Jane Fonda"	39:50	June 16, 2021
Lovato shared her coming out journey with actor Jane Fonda, the two talked about patriarchy and the critical fight for global climate.
6	"Jameela Jamil"	47:55	June 23, 2021
Lovato chatted with actor and advocate Jameela Jamil about taking back ownership of own bodies, eating disorders, mental health issues and addiction.
7	"Chelsea Handler"	36:48	June 30, 2021
Lovato talked with comedian Chelsea Handler about therapy, body image, being topless, and building empathy.
8	"JoJo"	40:45	July 7, 2021
Singer JoJo spoke with Lovato about her comeback story, body image, and the pressure to look a certain way as an artist.
9	"JoJo Siwa"	43:16	July 14, 2021
Dancer JoJo Siwa opened up about coming out, "gay awakenings", and building an empire.
10	"Chaz Bono"	26:16	July 21, 2021
Actor Chaz Bono talked with Lovato about his journey toward sobriety, gender transition, and fascination with cults.
11	"Dr. Steven Greer"	36:10	July 28, 2021
Lovato brought ufologist Steven M. Greer to dive deep into their mutual fascination with extraterrestrial life.
12	"Sadhguru"	43:27	August 4, 2021
Lovato discussed about cultivating joy, protecting the planet, and motorcycles with yogi and visionary Jaggi Vasudev.
13	"Michael Pollan"	44:51	August 11, 2021
Lovato talked about the powers, risks and potentiality of plant medicine.
14	"Bretman Rock"	40:28	August 18, 2021
Lovato discussed with beauty influencer Bretman Rock about spirituality, non-binary identity and her grandmother's influence.
15	"Emily Hampshire"	53:23	September 1, 2021
Lovato and actor Emily Hampshire talked about eating disorder, sexuality, and their first meeting.
16	"Jordan Firstman"	45:49	September 8, 2021
Lovato had a "hilarious", "soulful" and "meta" conversation with writer and filmmaker Jordan Firstman.
17	"Hailey Bieber"	39:16	September 17, 2021
Lovato and model Hailey Bieber recounted their memory from the Met Gala, talked about business venture and Bieber addressed rumors surrounding relationship with husband Justin Bieber.
18	"Justin Baldoni"	47:58	September 22, 2021
Lovato discussed about masculinity and femininity, trauma response, and the Baháʼí Faith with author Justin Baldoni.
19	"Jonathan Van Ness"	33:39	September 29, 2021
Lovato chatted with hairdresser and television personality Jonathan Van Ness about spirit and wisdom to Queer Eye, childhood experiences, and LGBTQIA+ rights.
20	"Jay Shetty"	40:54	October 6, 2021
Lovato and life coach Jay Shetty discussed about finding purpose, self-love and expanding circle of relationships.
21	"Ricardo Gonzalez"	25:57	October 13, 2021
Lovato talked about extraterrestrial life, illusions and the importance of living fully with author and researcher Ricardo Gonzalez.
22	"Shan Boodram"	34:28	November 8, 2021
Lovato and intimacy educator Shan Boodram talked about intimacy and tried to break down the stigma around pleasure, whilst Lovato launched a vibrator, the Demi Wand, with Bellesa.
23	"Congresswoman Cori Bush"	34:03	November 17, 2021
Lovato and US Congresswoman Cori Bush discussed how Bush's life experiences shaped her career as an activist and politician.
