= OBB Media =

American multimedia production company

- Type: Private
- Industry: Production company, television, movies, podcasts, studios
- Founded: 2016; 10 years ago
- Founder: Michael D. Ratner
- Headquarters: West Hollywood, California, United States
- Key people: Michael D. Ratner (President and CEO), Scott Ratner (Co-Founder and COO)
- Divisions: OBB Pictures, OBB Sound, OBB Branded, OBB Cares, OBB Studios
- Website: obbmedia.com

OBB Media is an American multimedia production company and vertically integrated content studio founded in 2016 by entrepreneur and producer Michael D. Ratner. OBB Media includes five different subsidiaries: OBB Pictures, the film, television, and digital arm; OBB Studios, the company’s facilities and physical production arm; OBB Sound, the podcast division; OBB Branded, the branded content and commercials vertical; and OBB Cares, the social impact division.

Since its inception in 2016, the company has become best known for projects including the Grammy-nominated Justin Bieber: Our World and Seasons; Demi Lovato: Dancing with the Devil; Kevin Hart’s Cold As Balls; Netflix’s Historical Roasts; and Hailey Bieber’s Who’s In My Bathroom?.

The company headquarters is located in West Hollywood, California. The company’s sound stages and post-production facility, OBB Studios, is located in Hollywood, California.

== History ==
Founded in 2016 by Michael D. Ratner, OBB Media is the parent company to OBB Pictures, OBB Sound, OBB Branded and OBB Cares. The multimedia production company and studio specializes in TV, digital, film, podcasts, branded content and social good, and has amassed an audience of over 2 billion.

== OBB Pictures ==
OBB Pictures is the film, television and digital content arm of the parent company OBB Media, with its most notable deal with the Walt Disney Company in multi-year, non-exclusive contract to create docu-series, documentaries, original and unscripted content.

=== TV/Digital ===
In February 2018, OBB Pictures released Cold As Balls in conjunction with Laugh Out Loud Network. The series stars Kevin Hart as he interviews different athletes and celebrities while both interviewer and interviewee are sitting in cold tubs. The series has garnered over 1.5 billion views across the platform. Season 10 of Cold as Balls kicked off in March 2024 and featured episodes that were taped for the first time in front of a live audience.

In 2019, OBB produced Netflix's Historical Roasts, an American comedy television series based on the Los Angeles live comedy show of the same name. Netflix ordered six episodes of Historical Roasts, a half-hour comedy series from Comedy Central roast star Jeff Ross and OBB Pictures. OBB optioned the rights to the live show and then secured the deal with Netflix, which beat out multiple bidders.

Also in 2019, OBB Pictures produced The Harder Way for ESPN+, with LeBron James and his SpringHill banner serving as executive producer.

In early 2020, OBB premiered a docu-series titled Justin Bieber: Seasons, which sold for more than $20M. The docuseries’ first episode was the most-viewed premiere of all the platform’s original series to date. OBB produced the music video for Justin Bieber's "Intentions", featuring Quavo, which was directed by Michael D. Ratner. In October 2020, OBB Pictures released Justin Bieber: Next Chapter, a documentary follow-up to the hit ten-episode docuseries, Justin Bieber: Seasons.

In June 2020, OBB announced it will spearhead a four-part documentary series on YouTube called Demi Lovato: Dancing with the Devil, following pop star Demi Lovato; the series was released on March 23, 2021. Earlier that year, it was announced that Demi Lovato: Dancing with the Devil was selected as the opening night headliner of SXSW and would have its world premiere at the film festival. The film explores every aspect that led to Lovato's nearly fatal overdose in 2018 and her awakenings in the aftermath.

In 2021, OBB Pictures partnered with Hailey Bieber to launch her YouTube Channel. Bieber and OBB will create a slate of short-form videos, including the hit series, Who's in my Bathroom? The channel reached a million subscribers within the first six weeks of launch.

In late 2021, Cold as Balls with Kevin Hart dropped season five and garnered over ten million views. OBB Pictures released Inside the Lockdown Sessions with Elton John and Adele: The 30 Interview on Apple Music.

In 2022, OBB Pictures released The Game Plan with Shaquille O'Neal in February 2022. The TNT TV series showcases the NBA legend working with entrepreneurs to help identify new opportunities for their business.

In late 2022, OBB Pictures and HeartBeat Productions announced Storytown, a scripted, adult animated hip-hop comedy on HBO Max.

In 2022, OBB Media struck a deal with the Walt Disney Company. The multi-year, non-exclusive development deal focuses on creating documentaries, docu-series, original specials and unscripted formats that cater to Gen Z and millennial audiences across Disney platforms, working alongside Disney’s unscripted production unit, Walt Disney Television Alternative.

In 2023, Hailey Bieber and OBB Pictures launched What’s In My Kitchen?, the first spinoff series from the popular Who’s In My Bathroom? series.

Also in 2023, OBB partnered with Spotify to produce Billions Club: The Series – an extension of the Billions Club playlist which launched in 2020 and includes all of the songs on Spotify that have hit the major milestone. The series stars Ariana Grande, Bad Bunny, Billie Eilish, Post Malone, Lisa and more. At the 2024 Webby Awards, the series won for Best Social Video Series, and was the People's Voice Winner for Best Branded Video Series.

Later in 2023, OBB Pictures two holiday specials: A Very Demi Holiday with Demi Lovato for Roku and the 2023 iHeart Radio Jingle Ball Special for ABC and Hulu, the latter of which featured Olivia Rodrigo, SZA and more, and drew 9.5 million viewers for the two-hour program.

=== Film ===
In May 2016, OBB Pictures produced Gonzo @ the Derby for ESPN's 30 for 30 series, which followed Hunter S. Thompson's trip to the Kentucky Derby and is directed by Michael D. Ratner and narrated by Sean Penn.

Also in 2016, OBB Pictures produced the Netflix film One In A Billion.

In 2021, OBB Pictures released Justin Bieber: Our World on Amazon Prime Video, a documentary film centering on Canadian singer Justin Bieber as he prepares for his first full concert in three years, directed by Michael D. Ratner. It received a nomination for Best Music Film at the 65th Annual Grammy Awards.

In 2023, OBB Pictures announced production on Demi Lovato’s directorial debut Child Star, a feature documentary deconstructing the highs and lows of growing up in the spotlight through the lens of some of the world’s most famous former child stars, including Lovato. Child Star is set to stream exclusively on Hulu in 2024.

In 2023, OBB Pictures shared a work-in-progress screening of Mountain Queen: The Summits of Lhakpa Sherpa at the Toronto Film Festival, resulting in Netflix's acquisition of the documentary for a 2024 release. Directed by two-time Academy Award nominee Lucy Walker, the film tells the story of Lhakpa Sherpa, the most decorated female climber of Everest who trains while working at Whole Foods to support her family.

In February 2024, the company released Kids Are Growing Up: A Story About A Kid Named LAROI on Prime Video, chronicling the young star's meteoric rise to fame.

== OBB Studios ==
OBB Media announced the launch of OBB Studios in January 2023, spanning 15,000 square feet and located in Hollywood, CA. The facility consists of two filming stages and thirteen support rooms, including hair and makeup, wardrobe, two green rooms, conference space and open-space work areas. Additionally, the space offers post-production facilities, such as a mix room, coloring suite, offline editing space and a vocal booth for ADR, voice and live music recording.

OBB Studios debuted with a launch event, which included various activations and musical performances by The Kid Laroi and Justin Bieber.

== OBB Sound ==
OBB Sound is the podcast division of OBB Media launched in 2019 as part of OBB Media’s expansion. The company develops and produces audio projects that span a variety of genres — from sports to music to talk and more — in scripted and unscripted formats.

In 2020, OBB Sound announced the launch of a health and wellness podcast series featuring Blake Griffin titled The Pursuit of Healthiness, which ran for multiple seasons on Audible and was Webby nominated, seasons 2 and 3 of Ashley Graham's Pretty Big Deal podcast. In October 2020, OBB Sound released Country Shine with Graham Bunn, a country music podcast with new episodes twice a week on Spotify. Billed as "the ultimate destination for fans of country music," the series is hosted by Bunn and co-hosted with sports reporter Camryn Irwin.

In January 2021, OBB Sound and Rolling Stone released a new original podcast Too Long; Didn't Watch, which is hosted by Rolling Stone chief TV critic Alan Sepinwall. OBB Sound partnered with Audible to produce original audio series. Also announced was the forthcoming scripted ten-part possession horror series The Glowing, for Audible, which is entering production in 2021. In March 2021, it was announced that OBB Sound would be partnering with Cadence 13 and Demi Lovato on a new podcast, 4D with Demi Lovato. The weekly podcast series features Lovato conversing with special guests about identity, creativity, activism, philanthropy and beyond. The series earned a GLAAD Special Recognition Award in 2022.

In 2021, OBB Sound signed an overall, non-exclusive multi-project deal with Audible.

In late 2021, OBB Sound began producing IN GOOD FAITH, a podcast series hosted by Churchome founders Chelsea and Judah Smith.

In 2022, OBB Sound relaunched The Zach Sang Radio Show as an interview podcast, as well as an accompanying daily radio show released on Amazon’s Amp app.

In October 2022, OBB Sound and Lena Waithe’s Hillman Grad released the scripted audio sitcom Kym on Audible. The podcast is an original comedy series inspired by the life of actor-comedian Kym Whitley as she navigates single motherhood and Hollywood. Kym was named one of the top ten best new podcasts of the year by both Variety and Audible.

In 2022, OBB Sound and Rolling Stone produced the podcast Musicians on Musicians, which brings together artists for conversations and asks: “what happens when the artist asks the questions?” Episodes have included RM and Pharrell, Finneas and Rick Rubin, Rina Sawayama and Shania Twain, and many more.

In 2024, OBB Sound released How to Break Up By Text hosted by comedian Allison Goldberg.

== OBB Branded ==
OBB Branded is the branded content and commercial production division of OBB Media. The group has created content for brands such as Apple Music, Rhode, Airbnb, Glenlivet, Lexus, LG, Michelin, Old Spice, Red Bull, Tinder, PointsBet Australia, GoPuff, Kylie Cosmetics and 818 Tequila.

OBB Branded created and produced the series Inside Kylie Cosmetics. The series is about Kylie Jenner and running her cosmetics brand, Kylie Cosmetics.

== OBB Cares ==
OBB Cares is the social impact arm of parent company OBB Media dedicated to leveraging its resources to inspire sustainable social change.

OBB Cares supports civic participation, producing content such as the 2022 voter education campaign with Levi’s launched on Vote Early Day, the 2020 “#VoteWithUS” campaign with Justin Bieber and Demi Lovato, and the 2022 “I am a voter." PSA campaign with Hailey Bieber that was distributed in AMC Theatres nationwide.

OBB Cares works to amplify community-based nonprofit organizations, producing content such as the 2020 Intentions music video with Justin Bieber, SB Projects, and Universal Music which supported Alexandria House, a nonprofit that provides safe housing for women and children.

OBB Cares is also working towards reducing its environmental impact on productions with the help of the Green Spark Group, and promoting climate solutions in its storytelling, serving as community partners of the Good Energy Project. In partnership with Hailey Bieber and What’s In My Kitchen?, OBB Cares sourced ingredients from local food justice organization Community Services Unlimited and included food waste tips and resources in the show.

== Awards ==
Year	Association	Award Category	Nomination	Result
2024	Webby Awards	Best Social Video Series	Spotify's Billions Club: The Series	Won
2024	Webby Awards	Best Social Video Series	Spotify's Billions Club: The Series	People’s Voice Winner
2022	Grammy Awards	Best Music Film	Justin Bieber: Our World	Nominated
2022	Streamy Awards	Crossover	Hailey Rhode Bieber	Nominated
2022	GLAAD Media Awards	Special Recognition Award	4D With Demi Lovato	Won
2021	MTV Video Music Awards	Best Video for Good	Demi Lovato: Dancing With The Devil	Nominated
2021	YouTube Creator Awards	Silver & Gold Creator Award	Hailey Rhode Bieber	Won
2021	SXSW	Opening Night Headlining Film	Demi Lovato: Dancing With The Devil	Nominated
2021	The People’s Choice Awards		Justin Bieber: Our World	Nominated
2021	The People’s Choice Awards		Demi Lovato: Dancing With The Devil	Nominated
2021	MTV Video Music Awards	Best Music Documentary	Demi Lovato: Dancing with the Devil	Nominated
2020	MTV Video Music Awards	Best Pop Video	"Intentions" – Justin Bieber ft. Quavo	Nominated
2020	Streamy Awards	Best Documentary	Justin Bieber: Seasons	Nominated
2020	Streamy Awards	Best Branded Content Series	Cold As Balls with Kevin Hart	Nominated
2019	Streamy Awards	Best Branded Content Series	Cold As Balls with Kevin Hart	Nominated
2019	Clio Awards	Sports	Blake Vs. Todd	Won
2018	Streamy Awards	Sports	Cold As Balls with Kevin Hart	Won
2018	The Telly Awards		The Fifth Quarter	Won
2016	Tribeca Film Festival	Official Selection	Gonzo @ the Derby	Nominated
2015	Sundance Film Festival	Official Selection	In Football We Trust	Nominated
2014	Tribeca Film Festival	Official Selection	The 30 Year Old Bris	Nominated

== Filmography ==
=== TV Series ===
Year	Title	Network
2012-	Paula & Pablo	Homegames Network
2018	Comedy by Blake	
2018	The 5th Quarter	
2018	Cold as Balls	Seasons 1-8; Peacock & LOL Network
2019	Can I Steal You for a Second?	Hulu
2019	Historical Roasts	Netflix
2020	Justin Bieber: Seasons	YouTube Originals
2020	A Season with the Memphis Tigers	ESPN+
2020	&Music	Roku
2021	Demi Lovato: Dancing with the Devil	YouTube Originals
2021	Who’s In My Bathroom? With Hailey Rhode Bieber	
2021	Inside Kylie Cosmetics	
2021	Adele: The 30 Interview	Apple Music
2021	Elton John: Inside the Lockdown Sessions	Apple Music
2022	The Game Plan with Shaquille O’Neal	TNT
2022-	Paula & Pablo	Nickelodeon

=== Films ===
Year	Title	Notes	Studio
2016	30 for 30: Gonzo @ The Derby	Short	ESPN
2016	Ride Along	Short	Vice
2016	One in a Billion	Documentary	Netflix
2020	Justin Bieber: Next Chapter	Documentary Special	YouTube Originals
2021	Justin Bieber: Our World	Documentary	Amazon Prime Video
2026	The Paula & Pablo Movie	???	Paramount Pictures/20th Century Studios/Homegames Studios

=== Music videos ===
Year	Title	Artist
2014	“We Don’t”	Ace Hood
2014	“I Want The Love”	Puff Daddy Feat. Meek Mill
2020	“Intentions”	Justin Bieber ft. Quavo
2020	“Changes: The Movement”	Justin Bieber
2021	“Dancing with the Devil”	Demi Lovato
