= Carla Vernón =

American consumer goods executive

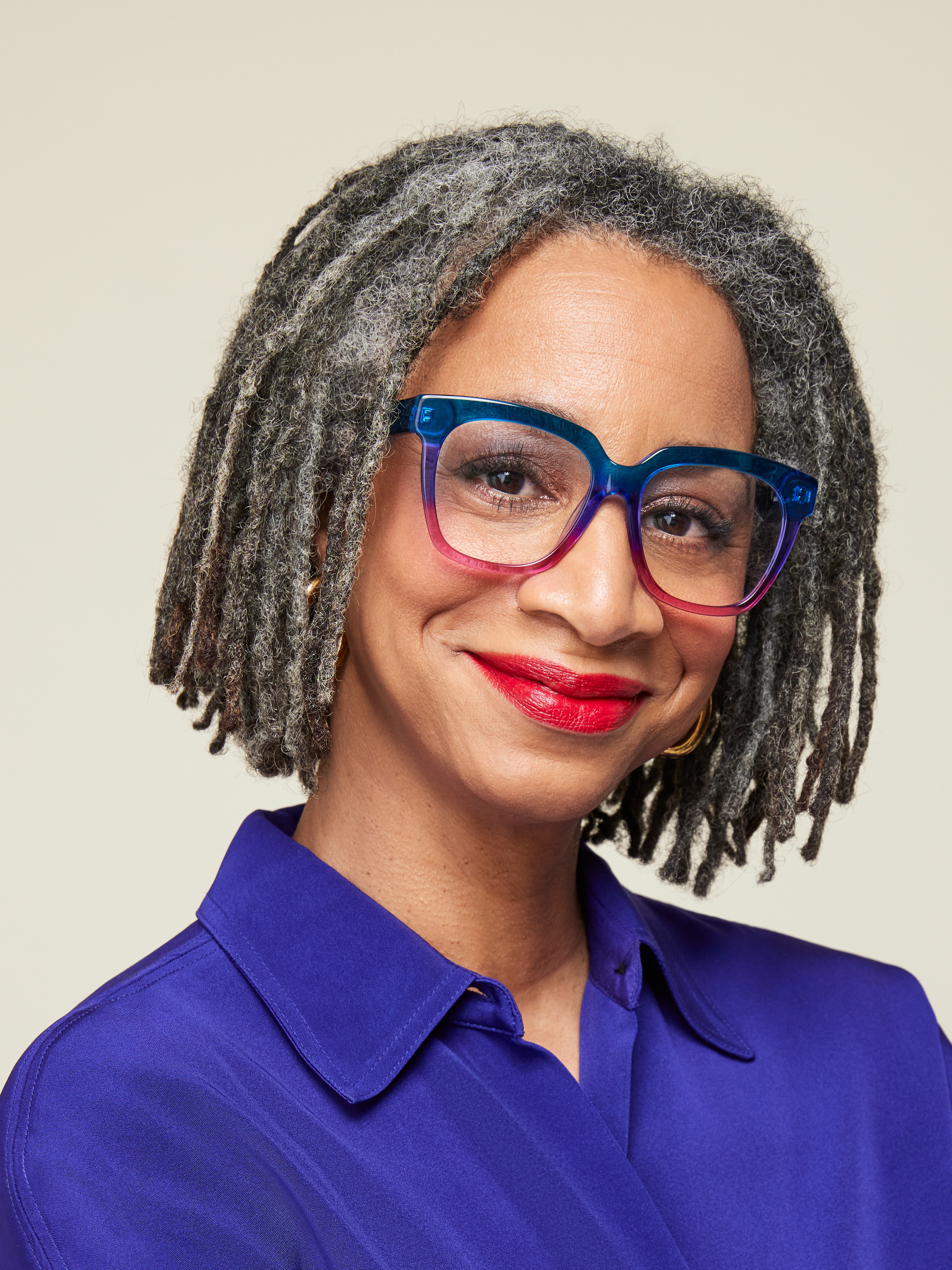
- Vernón in 2023
- Education: Princeton University (BA); University of Texas at Austin (MBA)
- Occupation: Businesswoman
- Spouse: Jason Bowles (m. 2000)
- Children: 2

Carla Vernón (/vɛərnoʊn/) is an American businesswoman. She is the chief executive officer (CEO) of The Honest Company. She previously held executive positions at Amazon and was General Mills division president of Natural and Organic Foods.

== Early life and education ==
Vernón's father immigrated from Panama to New Orleans, Louisiana in 1958. Her mother, Cynthia, is a graduate of Xavier University of Louisiana, where she met Vernón's father. She raised Carla and her brother, Tony, in Western New York state. Her mother worked as a high school math and science teacher and her father as a math professor and administrator for the State University of New York system. Her mother took her to the 1978 women's march for the Equal Rights Amendment. Vernón studied ballet and had her first partnering dance class at the age of 9, as a summer school student of Arthur Mitchell who was a former principal dancer with the New York City Ballet.

Vernón majored in ecology and biology during her undergraduate studies at Princeton University. From 1996 to 1998, she attended McCombs School of Business at the University of Texas at Austin, where she met her future husband, Jason Bowles; on August 19, 2000, they married.

== Career ==
=== Early positions ===
After her graduation from Princeton in 1992, Vernón worked for The Nature Conservancy in Chicago for a year, then for United States Senator Carol Moseley Braun (D-IL) for two years, and for City Year for a year.

Upon completion of her MBA studies at McCombs in 1998, Vernón began her career at General Mills, focusing on the Cheerios brand.

=== General Mills and Amazon ===
By 2013, Vernón was marketing director for the General Mills "Big G" cereals line. She then advanced to an executive position for the Yoplait brand. During 2015 and 2016, Vernón was vice president and business director for the General Mills snack unit, which included Nature Valley bars, Fiber One snacks, Larabar, Fruit Snacks, and Cascadian Farm bars. In 2017, she became a vice president for the natural and organic growth acceleration unit, before being promoted to president of Annie's Homegrown and president of General Mills' natural and organic operating unit.

In April 2020, Vernón left General Mills for Amazon, as Vice President of Consumables. She was the company's highest ranking woman of color at the time. In this position, she oversaw the online store's revenue growth in the baby care, household products, food, beverages, health and wellness, and beauty categories. Vernón and The Honest Company collaborated in 2021, making The Honest Company store on Amazon.com fully digital.

=== The Honest Company ===
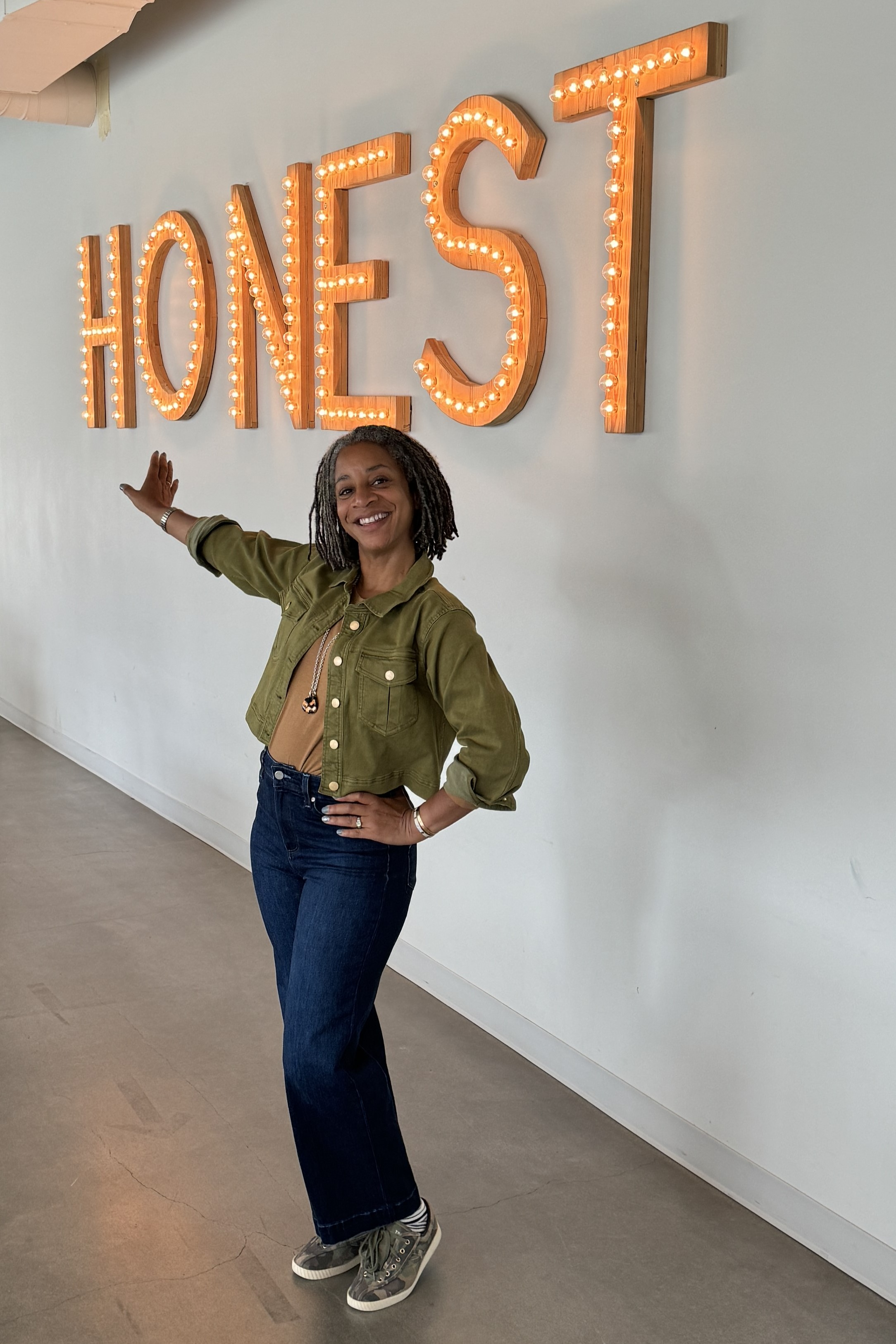
Vernón at The Honest Company headquarters in Playa Vista, Los Angeles.

Vernón was appointed Chief Executive Officer of The Honest Company, replacing Nick Vlahos, in January 2023. In the same year, she was recognized by Time as a top Latino business leader.

Her hiring as CEO was noted in interviews as a means to address the company's low share price and to define a new strategy that results in improved profitability in 2024. As part of that strategy, Vernón announced that the Honest Company would exit European and Asian markets in June 2023.

=== Board of Directors service ===
Vernón served on the national Board of Directors for the Make-A-Wish Foundation and as an Advisory Board member for the Wisconsin School of Business, Center for Brand & Product Management.

She is a Henry Crown Fellow at the Aspen Institute and was elected to the Princeton University Board of Trustees in 2020.
