= Unacceptable Levels =

- Directed by: Ed Brown
- Written by: Ed Brown
- Release date: June 2, 2013 (San Francisco Green Film Festival)
- Country: United States
- Language: English

Unacceptable Levels is a 2013 documentary film about the widespread use of artificial chemicals and their effects on the natural environment and human health. It was directed and written by first-time filmmaker Ed Brown.

== Featured people ==
The film features Ralph Nader, Devra Lee Davis, Stacy Malkan, Ken Cook, Christopher Gavigan, Alan Greene, John Warner, Andy Igrejas, Joan Blades, William Hirzy, Richard Clapp, Tyrone Hayes, Jeffrey Hollender, and Randy Hayes.

== Screenings ==
The film toured the United States in the summer of 2013, with screenings scheduled for San Francisco on July 11, Chicago on July 24, and Austin, Texas, on August 24.

== Reception ==
Unacceptable Levels received several film festival awards, including Health & Environment Film Prize at the 30th International Environmental Film Festival in Paris, a special jury prize at the 2012 Yosemite International Film Festival and the PlayItFwd Award at the 2012 FILManthropy Festival.

Geoff Berkshire in Variety writes the film "marries folksy astonishment and alarmist speculation in a documentary far too easy to dismiss." Robert Abele of the Los Angeles Times called it "an appropriately feel-bad offering for discerning environmental paranoids."
