= TDE =

TDE may refer to:

- Dichlorodiphenyldichloroethane (Tetrachlorodiphenylethane), an insecticide
- Telefónica de España, London Stock Exchange symbol
- The Daily Edited, an Australian luxury fashion brand specialising in monogrammable leather goods
- The Dark Eye, a role-playing game
- Tidal disruption event, an astronomical phenomenon near a supermassive black hole
- Top Dawg Entertainment, a record label
- Total Direct Énergie (cycling team), a UCI Continental Circuits cycling team
- Transparent data encryption, a technique to encrypt database content
- Trinity Desktop Environment, an offshoot of the KDE 3.5 desktop environment
- Thomson-Davis Editor, console text editor
