= The Honest Company =

Consumer goods company founded 2011

The Honest Company, Inc.
- Type: Public
- Traded as: Nasdaq: HNST
- Industry: Retail
- Founded: 2011; 15 years ago
- Founders: Jessica Alba; Christopher Gavigan; Brian Lee
- Headquarters: Los Angeles, California
- Area served: United States, Canada, Europe
- Key people: Carla Vernón (CEO); Jessica Alba (Former CCO)
- Products: Consumer goods
- Revenue: ▲US$344.37 million (2023)
- Net income: ▲US$−39.21 million (2023)
- Number of employees: 187 (full-time) (2021)
- Website: honest.com

The Honest Company, Inc. is an American digital-first consumer goods company, based in Los Angeles and founded by actress Jessica Alba (listed in company records by her married name, Jessica Warren), Christopher Gavigan, and Brian Lee. The company had $319 million in 2021 sales, and was valued at roughly $550 million as of February 2022. Carla Vernón, Chief Executive Officer, is one of the first Afro-Latina CEOs of a U.S. publicly traded company. The Honest Company has raised multiple rounds of venture capital, and went public via an initial public offering in May 2021, generating over $100 million in capital. Honest serves the United States, China, Canada, and Europe.

== History ==
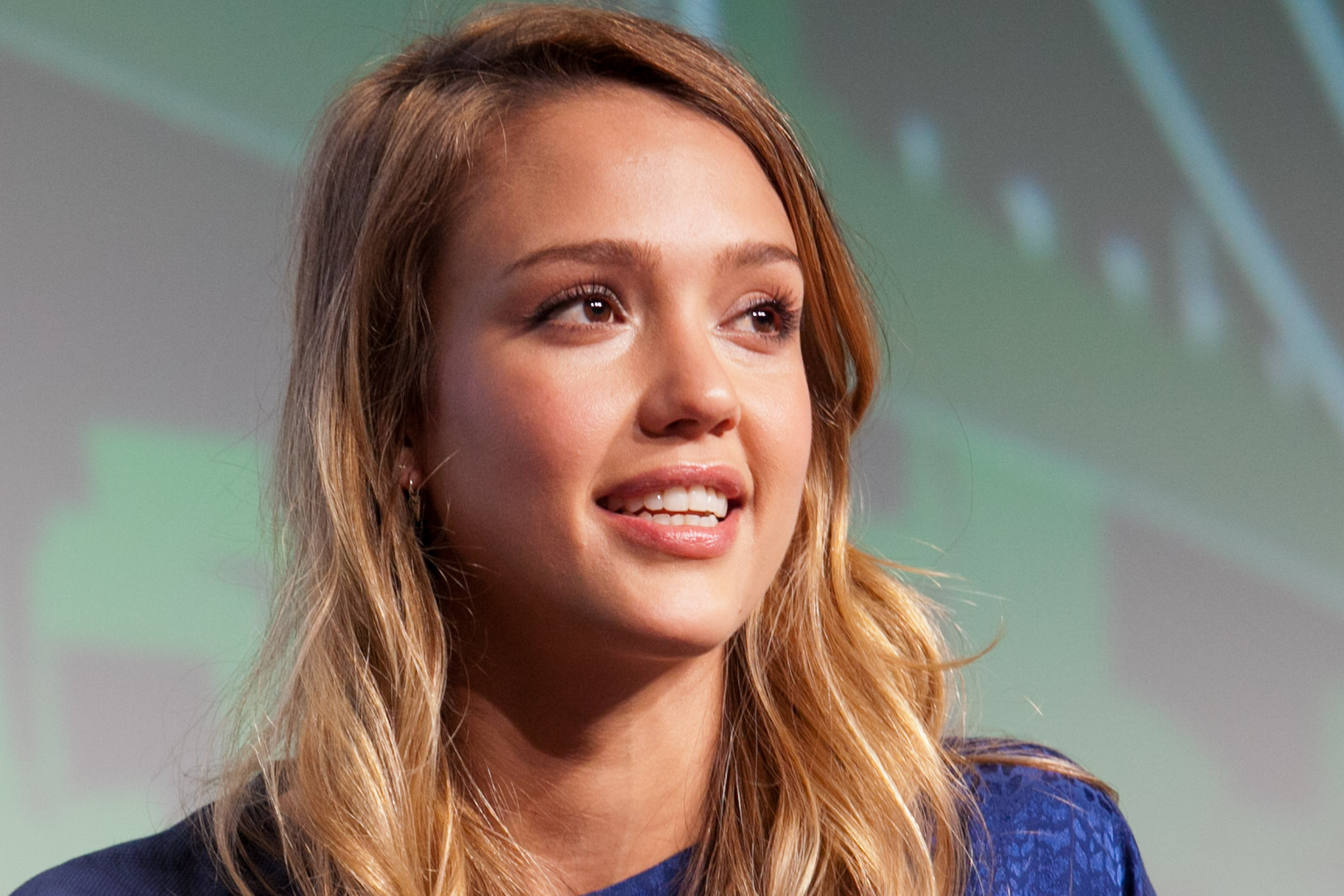
Jessica Alba, co-founder of The Honest Company

Company co-founder Jessica Alba was inspired by the 2008 birth of her first child and her own history of childhood illnesses to create a company that provided an alternative to baby products with ingredients such as petrochemicals and synthetic fragrances. The company was launched in 2012 with 17 products.

In 2013, The Honest Company's sales reached $50 million. Honest raised $70 million from venture capitalists in the summer of 2014 in preparation for an initial public offering. The financing put a value on the company of $1 billion. Prior to the 2014 round of financing led by Wellington Management Company, the company had raised $52 million in financing from ICONIQ Capital, General Catalyst Partners, Institutional Venture Partners and Lightspeed Venture Partners.

In 2016, The Honest Company moved its headquarters from Santa Monica to the Playa Vista neighborhood of Los Angeles. The following month, it announced a new round of funding that generated an additional $100 million of venture capital, implying a valuation of $1.7 billion. In late 2015, the company acquired Alt12 Apps, the makers of popular apps such as Baby Bump, Pink Pad, and Kidfolio.

In March 2017, The Honest Company announced that Nick Vlahos would replace Brian Lee as chief executive officer. Vlahos worked on several Clorox brands, including Burt's Bees, Brita and Green Works. Brian Lee would remain on the board in an advisory role.

In October 2017, The Honest Company closed a series E round of funding. After settling two lawsuits in the summer of 2017, the valuation was set at $19.60 per share down from the Series D shares sold in 2015 at $45.75, and market value of less than $1 billion.

In April 2021, The Honest Company officially filed for an initial public offering. The company began trading on the NASDAQ exchange with ticker symbol HNST on May 5, 2021. The IPO raised $412.8 million.

In April 2024, Alba stepped down from her role as Chief Creative Officer, a leadership change that led to the removal of her name and likeness from certain packaging and a short-term market reaction in the company’s shares.

== Products and distribution ==
The Honest Company offers a wide range of consumer products focused on baby care products, personal care, home cleaning, and beauty. Product lines include diapers and wipes made with sustainably harvested materials, gentle skin and body wash, lotions, shampoos, conditioners, and fragrances, many of which are free from parabens, phthalates, synthetic fragrances, and other ingredients the company excludes via its “No List”. The beauty line features skincare and color cosmetics formulated with naturally-derived ingredients, and in 2021 the company redesigned over 100 SKUs to use post-consumer recycled or "tree-free" packaging.

The Honest Company markets its products as safe and eco-friendly. The company does not use "health-compromising chemicals or compounds", including the "No List" of ingredients that it promises to never allow in its products. Whole Foods and Costco were The Honest Company's initial retail distributors. The company began selling in Target Corporation on June 15, 2014. Other stores that carried the company's products by mid 2014 included Buy Buy Baby and Nordstrom. By the end of the third quarter of 2014, the company carried 90 products. Its leading seller was diapers.

Under Vlahos's leadership as CEO, Honest Company expanded its internal laboratories and R&D team and opened a fulfillment center. In 2022, Honest expanded its retail partnerships to include Walmart, Ulta Beauty, and GNC (company). As part of the Ulta partnership, Honest released its first acne line. In the fall of 2022, the company partnered with SuperOrdinary to launch on the e-commerce platform, Tmall Global in China.

=== The Honest Standard ===
The Honest Standard is a product-safety and development protocol that governs ingredient selection, testing, manufacturing, packaging and labelling for product portfolio. Key elements include a publicly documented NO List (more than 3,500 chemicals and materials the company excludes), an ingredient-assessment process, and third-party testing and validation of formulations. Manufacturing partners are required to follow relevant Good Manufacturing Practices. The policy requires clear on-label ingredient disclosure (avoiding generic terms such as “fragrance”) and sets packaging sustainability criteria.

== Critical reception ==
In March 2016, it was reported by The Wall Street Journal that Honest's liquid laundry detergent product contained "a significant amount" of sodium lauryl sulfate or SLS, a synthetic surfactant that the company claimed it would "never consider for use in anything. Period." Honest's detergent is sourced from Earth Friendly Products (EFP) which did not test for SLS. EFP in turn purchased untested chemicals from Trichromatic West which also did not test for SLS. EFP had removed its claims of SLS-free product from its own website in late 2015.

It was reported in April 2016 that The Honest Company was being sued for representing its infant formula as organic, despite the product containing 11 synthetic substances prohibited under federal law in organic products. The Honest Company stated that the infant formula had been FDA-approved and certified USDA Organic in accordance with the National Organic Program. In December 2016, the Los Angeles Superior Court entered judgment for The Honest Company, dismissing the complaint.

== Honest Beauty ==
On September 9, 2015, the company introduced the Honest Beauty brand as a separate entity with its own website and logo. Its products are derived from botanicals free of parabens, phthalates, petrolatum, sulfates and chemical sunscreens. On September 25 of that year, the brand opened a pop-up retail shop in The Grove. The brand began selling the beauty line at Target in spring 2017.

Honest Beauty debuted in Western Europe (Germany, France, Spain, Italy, Poland, the Netherlands, and Austria) in 2019. Honest Beauty was sold exclusively by Douglas stores in Europe.

In 2021, Honest Beauty redesigned its brand packaging, using sustainable and recyclable materials. At the same time, it launched the Daily Defense skincare collection to protect from environmental pollutants. In 2022, Honest Beauty launched a four-step daily skincare routine for sensitive skin.
