= Rhode (brand) =

American skincare and beauty brand

HRBeauty LLC
- Type: Subsidiary
- Founded: 2022; 4 years ago
- Founders: Hailey Bieber; Michael D. Ratner; Lauren Ratner
- Headquarters: Beverly Hills, California, United States
- Area served: Worldwide
- Key people: Nick Vlahos (CEO); Hailey Bieber (CCO); Lauren Ratner (President and CBO)
- Products: Cosmetics; Skin care
- Revenue: ▲US$212 million (fiscal year ended March 31, 2025)
- Parent: e.l.f. Beauty, Inc.
- Website: www.rhodeskin.com

HRBeauty LLC, d.b.a. rhode (stylized in all lowercase), is an American skincare brand founded by model and entrepreneur Hailey Bieber, alongside Michael D. and Lauren Ratner, in 2022. It is based in Beverly Hills, California. Rhode products are distributed through its official website, Sephora, and available in multiple regions, including the United States, Canada, the United Kingdom, and Australia.

Originally launched offering three products, Rhode's product line has since grown to include facial cleansers, lotions, lip balms and blushes. It was acquired by e.l.f. Beauty in May 2025 in a US$1 billion deal.

== History ==
In 2019, Hailey Rhode Bieber began conceptualizing a cosmetics brand and filed to trademark "Bieber Beauty". It was rejected, as her husband Justin Bieber had already trademarked the name in 2010.

Bieber later launched rhode skin on June 15, 2022, alongside Lauren and Michael D. Ratner, choosing the name as a direct reference to her own middle name, Rhode, after her initial "Bieber Beauty" trademark application was rejected.

Rhode was funded primarily by Bieber, with investment firm One Luxury Group as a strategic partner.

Its core products at launch included the Peptide Glazing Fluid, Barrier Restore Cream and Peptide Lip Treatment. Within 11 days, Rhode had achieved $10 million in sales.

One week following the launch, a fashion brand named Rhode co-founded by Purna Khatau and Phoebe Vickers filed a trademark infringement claim against Bieber, claiming her use of the name caused consumer confusion. A judge denied the motion "for a preliminary injunction without prejudice."

In May 2025, Rhode announced it would be acquired by e.l.f. in a deal that consists of $800 million in cash and stock, with an additional $200 million based on future sales. The acquisition was completed in August.

In April 2026, Rhode released the Rhode x The Biebers collaboration with Justin Bieber, introducing Spotwear hydrocolloid pimple patches alongside limited-edition versions of its Peptide Lip Treatment and Peptide Eye Prep.
