= Justin Bieber: Our World =

- Official release poster
- Directed by: Michael D. Ratner
- Produced by: Kfir Goldberg; Andy Mininger; Michael D. Ratner; Scott Ratner
- Starring: Justin Bieber; Hailey Bieber
- Edited by: Paul Greenhouse; Vicky Lim; Paul Little; Tom Watson
- Music by: Justin Bieber
- Production companies: OBB Pictures; Bieber Time Films; Scooter Braun Films
- Distributed by: Amazon MGM Studios
- Release date: October 8, 2021
- Running time: 94 minutes
- Country: United States

Justin Bieber: Our World is a 2021 American documentary film centering on Canadian singer Justin Bieber as he prepares for his first full concert in three years, directed by Michael D. Ratner. It was released on Amazon Prime Video on October 8, 2021.

At the 65th Annual Grammy Awards, the film received a nomination for Best Music Film.

== Summary ==
The film delves into Justin Bieber's personal life and follows him as he prepares for his New Year's Eve show on December 31, 2020 on the rooftop of the Beverly Hilton hotel. The concert was attended by 240 fans and livestreamed around the world. The film also includes self-shot footage by Bieber and his wife Hailey. Ratner previously directed Bieber's music video for "Intentions", and the docu-series Justin Bieber: Seasons (2020).

== Cast ==
- Justin Bieber
- Hailey Bieber
- Scooter Braun
- Nick DeMoura
- Johnny Erasme
- Bernard "Harv" Harvey
- Chris Gratton
- Rory Kramer

== Release ==
On September 7, 2021, Bieber released a teaser for the film on his Instagram feed, with a clip of him singing "All Around Me" from his 2020 album Changes. On September 7, 2021, Amazon Studios (now known as Amazon MGM Studios) announced that the film would be released in more than 240 countries on Prime Video on October 8, 2021.

== Reception ==
Richard Roeper of the Chicago Sun-Times called it "a well-photographed and sleek film" that will be "an immensely satisfying viewing experience" for Bieber's fan base. Chris Azzopardi of The New York Times wrote, "The doc encapsulates the shared exhilaration of watching Bieber perform during this socially distanced concert spectacle, but it’s only for the biggest Beliebers. And even they, too, may wish it didn’t play out in such tedious mechanical fashion. The film has a 55% approval rating on Rotten Tomatoes based on 11 reviews.
