= Game Face (film) =

- Directed by: Michiel Thomas
- Written by: David Chang, Yuhei Ogawa, Michiel Thomas
- Produced by: Mark Schoen
- Starring: Fallon Fox, Terrence Clemmons, Kye Allums, Jason Collins
- Cinematography: Bobby T. Lewis Brandon Musselman, Michiel Thomas
- Release date: April 26, 2015
- Countries: Belgium; United States
- Language: English

Game Face is a 2015 sports documentary film directed by Michiel Thomas and produced by Mark Schoen. The documentary revolves around two LGBTQ American athletes, professional mixed martial artist Fallon Fox and college basketball player Terrence Clemens. Both stories run parallel to each other to follow the journey of the first transgender woman professional MMA fighter and Clemens, a closeted gay male, who gets accepted to play basketball in Oklahoma. The film follows both athletes through their coming out process with the support of their friends and family.

== Film festivals ==
- The Toronto LGBT Film Festival screened Game Face on May 23, 2015, on their 25th annual anniversary.
- Fringe! Queer Film and Arts Fest in London screened Game Face on November 28, 2015.
- Game Face premiered in Dublin at the GAZE International LGBT Film Festival.
- The Kaleidoscope Film Festival in Arkansas, USA screened Game Face on July 31, 2015.
