= Scott-Vincent Borba =

American former esthetician turned Catholic priest (born 1973)

The Reverend Father Scott-Vincent Borba
- Born: June 23, 1973 (age 53); Visalia, California, U.S.
- Education: Santa Clara University; Saint Patrick's Seminary and University
- Occupation: Catholic priest
- Known for: Co-founder of e.l.f. Beauty

Scott-Vincent Borba (born June 23, 1973) is an American Catholic priest of the Diocese of Fresno in California. He is a former esthetician, model, singer, actor and businessman. He founded e.l.f. Beauty; BORBA, Inc.; and Scott-Vincent Borba, Inc. He has authored three books on skin care and beauty. In 2021, he resigned from his business ventures, entered Saint Patrick's Seminary and University, and was ordained as a priest in 2026.

== Early life and education ==
Scott-Vincent Borba was born on June 23, 1973, in Visalia, California, to Evelyn Ann Borba and Anthony Robert Borba Sr. The youngest of five siblings, he completed high school and junior college in Visalia. Borba suffered from cystic acne, rosacea, and weight issues during his youth. During college, Borba worked as a model and participated in runway fashion shows. He received his B.S. degree in Psychology from Santa Clara University.

== Career ==
=== Cosmetics ===
Following graduation, he moved to Los Angeles, California, and became a licensed esthetician. He worked for Hard Candy Cosmetics and in marketing for Procter & Gamble/Wella/Sebastian, Shiseido/Joico, Murad, and Johnson & Johnson/Neutrogena, where he launched the Neutrogena Men's line.

In June 2004, Borba co-founded the budget skin care line e.l.f. (short for eyes, lips, face) Cosmetics with Joseph Shamah. He worked with scientists, dermatologists and nutritionists to develop a line of skin care products which combined topical and edible ingredients. He began to market these later that year, including BORBA Waters beverages, supplements, and topical treatments. These were distributed in about 300 department stores, including Nordstrom's Cosmetics Department, Sephora, and Fred Segal. By 2006 the products were also being sold in health food stores, Walgreens drug stores, and through the QVC/Home Shopping Network.

In 2007, Borba published a book, Makeup for Dummies. In the same year, Anheuser-Busch signed a deal with BORBA for marketing and distribution of BORBA Skin Balance Waters and the powdered form, Aqua-Less Crystallines. Borba published his second book, Skintervention: The Personalized Solution for Healthier, Younger, and Flawless-Looking Skin, in January 2011. By this time, he had become a celebrity esthetician, helping models improve the appearance of their skin for public appearances. His most widely publicized work was a $7000 HD Diamond and Ruby facial he gave Mila Kunis for the 2011 Golden Globes. In 2012, he founded Scott-Vincent Borba, Inc., and in 2013 he published a third book, Cooking Your Way to Gorgeous: Skin-Friendly Superfoods, Age-Reversing Recipes, and Fabulous Homemade Facials, in which he discussed the skin benefits of various ingredients and recipes.

In 2009, Borba was spokesperson for the nonprofit organization Covenant House California. He also works with QLu, which raises funds for charities though auctions of personal items donated by celebrities. Since the death of his father, he is a representative for the Pancreatic Cancer Action Network.

=== Priesthood ===
In third grade, Borba's mother suggested that he become a priest, asking if he wanted to be like the priest wearing robes on the altar. Looking up at the priest, Borba felt called to the priesthood in that moment.

At a party in the mid-2010s, Borba noticed a sadness and emptiness, and in that moment turned to prayer and felt a conviction towards leaving his current life path. In 2019, he sold off large quantities of product and gave the proceeds to charity, and announced that he was planning to become a Catholic priest. He went to his first meeting with the diocesan vocations director in a luxury suit and car.

In 2021, he formally resigned from his business ventures and entered formation for the Catholic priesthood for the Diocese of Fresno at St. Patrick's Seminary and University. He spent the summer of 2022 working with the homeless with the Missionaries of Charity in San Francisco. He was ordained as a transitional deacon by Joseph Vincent Brennan, Bishop of Fresno, during a Mass at St. Charles Borromeo, Visalia, California. He was ordained as a Catholic priest on May 23, 2026.
