= Brian Lee (entrepreneur) =

South Korean-American entrepreneur

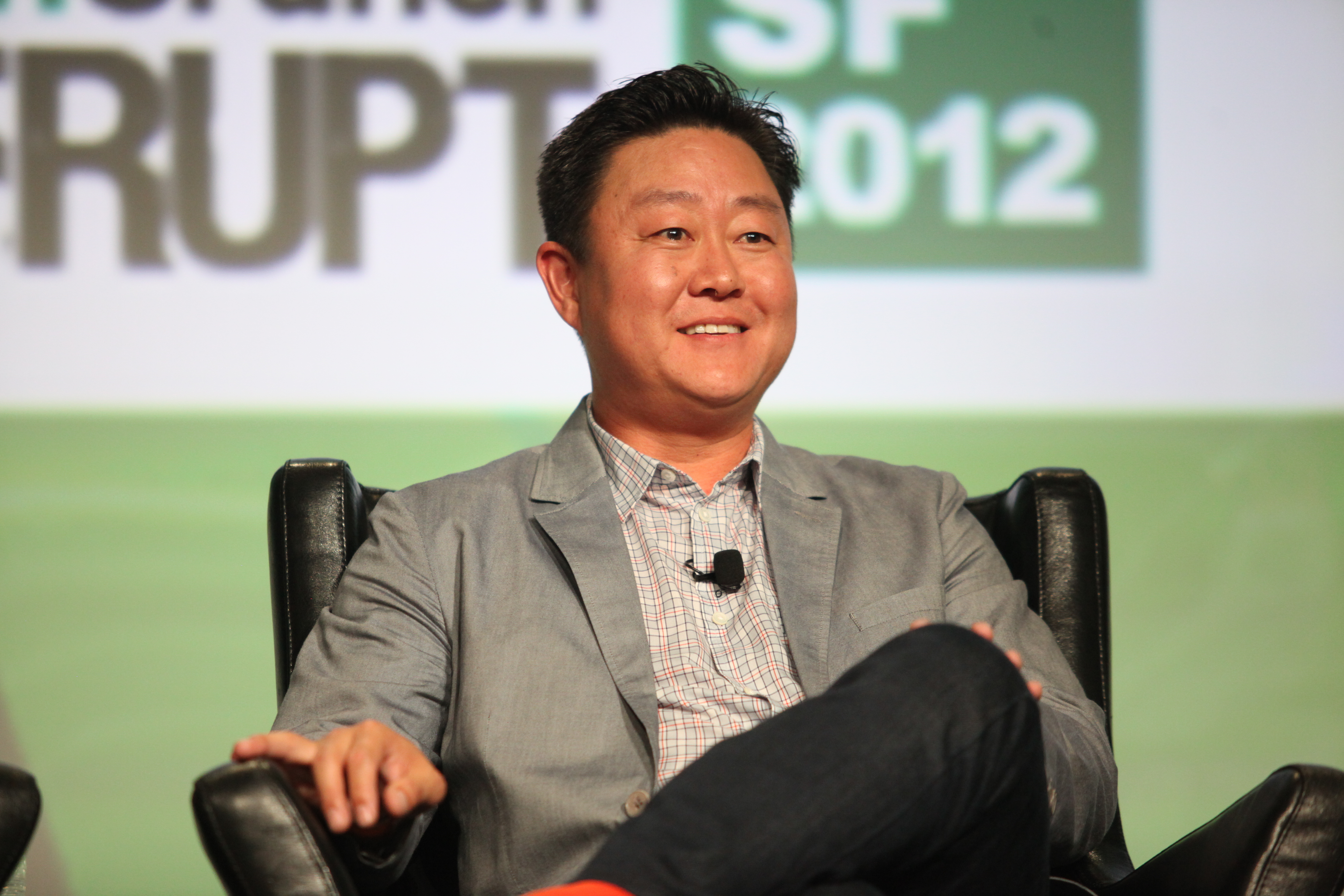
- Born: Brian Sung Lee; March 15, 1971 (age 54); Seoul, South Korea
- Education: University of California, Los Angeles (BS, JD)
- Occupation: Entrepreneur

Brian Sung Lee (born March 15, 1971) is a South Korean-American entrepreneur who co-founded LegalZoom, ShoeDazzle, and The Honest Company.

== Education and career ==
Lee was an attorney with Skadden, Arps, Slate, Meagher & Flom and a former manager at Deloitte. Lee graduated with a B.A. in Economics/Business from UCLA, and received his J.D. from UCLA School of Law.

In March 2001, Lee, along with Robert Shapiro, Brian P. Y. Liu, and Edward R. Hartman co-founded and launched Legalzoom.com, an online legal technology and services company.

In May 2009, Lee, Kim Kardashian, Robert Shapiro, and MJ Eng co-founded and launched ShoeDazzle.com, an online fashion subscription service.

Lee, Jessica Alba, Christopher Gavigan, and Sean Kane co-founded The Honest Company, a consumer goods company.

Lee has been a managing partner of BAM Ventures, a venture capital firm, since 2017.

In 2022, Lee and Derek Jeter co-founded the Arena Club, which was described as a digital sports card-collecting platform.

== Recognition ==
Lee was named one of the "25 most notable Korean-American entrepreneurs" by Forbes magazine in the year 2009. In 2014, Lee and the other co-founders of The Honest Company were recognized as the Emerging Entrepreneurs of the Year by Ernst & Young at their award show.
