= Fallon Fox =

American mixed martial artist (born 1975)

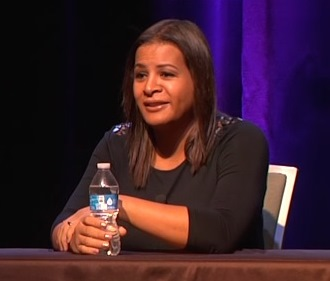
- Fox in 2016
- Born: November 29, 1975 (age 50); Toledo, Ohio, U.S.
- Nickname: The Queen of Swords
- Height: 5 ft 7 in (1.70 m)
- Weight: 135 lb (61 kg; 9.6 st)
- Division: Featherweight (2012–present)
- Reach: 70 in (178 cm)
- Fighting out of: Schaumburg, Illinois, U.S.
- Team: Midwest Training Center
- Years active: 2012–2014

Mixed martial arts record
- Total: 6
- Wins: 5
- By knockout: 3
- By submission: 2
- Losses: 1
- By knockout: 1

Other information
- Mixed martial arts record from Sherdog

Fallon Fox (born November 29, 1975) is an American former mixed martial artist (MMA), and the first MMA fighter who is openly transgender.

== Early life ==
Fox was born in Toledo, Ohio. She recalls struggling with her gender as early as age five or six. As a teenager, Fox believed she may have been a gay man, but learned the term "transgender" at the age of 17. Fox continued living as a heterosexual man and married her then-girlfriend at the age of 19, when the latter became pregnant with their daughter. Fox then joined the US Navy to support her new family and served as an operations specialist on the USS Enterprise.

After leaving the navy, Fox enrolled at the University of Toledo, but dropped out after ongoing psychological stress from her unresolved gender issues. Subsequently, Fox worked as a truck driver in order to afford sex reassignment surgery. Fox and her daughter moved to Chicago, Illinois, and in 2006, Fox traveled to Bangkok, Thailand, to undergo feminizing gender reassignment surgery, breast augmentation, and hair transplant surgeries at a hospital in Bangkok.

== Mixed martial arts career controversy ==
Fallon Fox came out as transgender on March 5, 2013, during an interview with Outsports writer Cyd Zeigler and Sports Illustrated, following her two initial professional fights in the women's division. Controversy swelled over confusion with the California State Athletic Commission (CSAC) and Florida's athletic commission over the licensing process Fox chose to complete in Coral Gables. After publications shed light on the licensing procedure and Fox's coming out many commentators brought up the issue of whether a woman who was assigned male at birth should be able to fight in women's divisions in MMA fighting. UFC color commentator and stand-up comedian Joe Rogan opposed Fallon Fox receiving licensing, saying,

First of all, she's not really a she. She's a transgender, post-op person. The operation doesn't shave down your bone density. It doesn't change. You look at a man's hands and you look at a woman's hands and they're built different. They're just thicker, they're stronger, your wrists are thicker, your elbows are thicker, your joints are thicker. Just the mechanical function of punching, a man can do it much harder than a woman can, period.

Due to controversy and the licensing procedure CFA co-founder Jorge De La Noval, who promoted Fox's fight on March 2 in Florida, postponed Fox's April 20 fight. However, De La Noval later stated his organization will not "turn our backs on her ... As long as she's licensed, she's always welcome in our promotion. We stand behind her and we give her all of our support." Fox claimed in her video interview with Cyd Zeigler to be within the rules of organizations such as the International Olympic Committee (IOC) for postoperative transsexuals and wishes to continue fighting in MMA.

On April 8, 2013, Matt Mitrione, in an appearance on The MMA Hour, said that Fox was "still a man", and called Fox an "embarrassment" and a "lying, sick, sociopathic, disgusting freak". UFC was "appalled by the transphobic comments" he made, and referring to itself as "a friend and ally of the LGBT community", it immediately suspended Mitrione, and fined him an undisclosed amount. The next day, Fox issued a response stating that Mitrione "personally attacked me as a fighter, as a woman, and as a human being". Mitrione's suspension was lifted after two weeks when his next fight against Brendan Schaub was announced.

Whether or not Fox possesses an advantage over cisgender female fighters was a topic on the April 2014 edition of HBO's Real Sports with Bryant Gumbel. In an interview with the New York Post, former UFC women's bantamweight champion Ronda Rousey stated she would be willing to fight Fox, saying "I can knock out anyone in the world", although she believes Fox has male bone density and structure, leading to an unfair advantage. In an interview with Out, Rousey said, "I feel like if you go through puberty as a 'man' it's not something you can reverse. ... There's no undo button on that." UFC president Dana White claimed that "bone structure is different, hands are bigger, jaw is bigger, everything is bigger" and said, "I don't think someone who used to be a man and became a woman should be able to fight a woman."

During Fox's fight against Tamikka Brents on September 13, 2014, Brents suffered a concussion, an orbital bone fracture, and seven staples to the head in the 1st round. After her loss, Brents took to social media to convey her thoughts on the experience of fighting Fox: "I've fought a lot of women and have never felt the strength that I felt in a fight as I did that night. I can't answer whether it's because she was born a man or not because I'm not a doctor. I can only say, I've never felt so overpowered ever in my life and I am an abnormally strong female in my own right", she stated. "Her grip was different, I could usually move around in the clinch against other females but couldn't move at all in Fox's clinch."

Eric Vilain, the director of the Institute for Society and Genetics at UCLA, worked with the Association of Boxing Commissions when they wrote their policy on transgender athletes. He stated in Time magazine: "Male to female transsexuals have significantly less muscle strength and bone density, and higher fat mass, than males", and said that, to be licensed, transgender female fighters must undergo complete "surgical anatomical changes ..., including external genitalia and gonadectomy" and subsequently a minimum of two years of hormone replacement therapy, administered by a board certified specialist. In general concurrence with peer-reviewed scientific literature, he states this to be "the current understanding of the minimum amount of time necessary to obviate male hormone gender related advantages in sports competition". Vilain reviewed Fox's medical records and said she has "clearly fulfilled all conditions". When asked if Fox could nonetheless be stronger than her competitors, Vilain replied that it was possible, but noted that "sports is made up of competitors who, by definition, have advantages for all kinds of genetics reasons". Fox herself responded to the controversy with an analogy comparing herself to Jackie Robinson in a guest editorial for a UFC and MMA news website:

Has anybody ever watched the movie 42? Remember when commentators said Jackie Robinson had an unfair advantage because black people had "larger heel bones" than the white men he was competing with? Are we repeating history yet again with bogus bone claims? Can we couple these bogus claims with Rogan's horrible language that was aimed at me from the video I put out last week? I'm a transgender woman. I deserve equal treatment and respect to other types of women. I feel that all of this is so ridiculously unnecessary and horribly mean spirited.

The documentary Game Face provides an inside look into Fox's life during the beginning of her MMA controversy. In July 2022, the BBC interviewed Fox on BBC Radio 4's Today programme, but later apologized for the interview, which had been criticised for not informing listeners that Fox had taken pride in violence against supposedly transphobic competitors. A tweet from Fox in 2020 said: "For the record, I knocked two out. One woman's skull was fractured, the other not. And just so you know, I enjoyed it. See, I love smacking up TEFS [sic] in the cage who talk transphobic nonsense. It’s bliss!" In response to the BBC, Fox said: "It's part of MMA culture to talk smack about opponents. You see it all the time. Only when I do it people take issue with it."

== Personal life ==
Fox was raised Christian, but has since become an atheist.

== Mixed martial arts record ==
Professional record breakdown
6 matches	5 wins	1 loss
By knockout	3	1
By submission	2	0

Res.	Record	Opponent	Method	Event	Date	Round	Time	Location	Notes
Win	5–1	Tamikka Brents	TKO (punches)	CCCW: The Undertaking	September 13, 2014	1	2:17	Springfield, Illinois, United States	
Win	4–1	Heather Bassett	Submission (armbar)	Xtreme Fighting Organization 50	March 21, 2014	2	0:44	Chicago, Illinois, United States	
Loss	3–1	Ashlee Evans-Smith	TKO (punches)	CFA 12	October 12, 2013	3	4:15	Coral Gables, Florida, United States	Women's Featherweight Tournament Final.
Win	3–0	Allanna Jones	Submission (shin choke)	CFA 11: Kyle vs. Wiuff 2	May 24, 2013	3	3:36	Coral Gables, Florida, United States	
Win	2–0	Ericka Newsome	KO (knee)	CFA 10: McSweeney vs. Staring	March 2, 2013	1	0:39	Coral Gables, Florida, United States	Women's Featherweight Tournament Semifinal.
Win	1–0	Elisha Helsper	TKO (injury)	KOTC Wild Card	May 17, 2012	1	2:00	Worley, Idaho, United States	

Amateur record breakdown		
1 match	1 win	0 losses
By submission	1	0

Res.	Record	Opponent	Method	Event	Date	Round	Time	Location	Notes
Win	1–0	Rickie Gomes	Submission (armbar)	Rocktown Showdown 12	June 10, 2011	1	2:27	Rockford, Illinois, United States	

== Awards ==
In 2014, Fox was inducted into the National Gay and Lesbian Sports Hall of Fame.

== See also ==
- Patricio Manuel, the first transgender professional boxer in the United States
- Parinya Charoenphol, Thai boxer and kathoey
