= Churchome =

American nondenominational megachurch based in Kirkland, Washington

- Location: Kirkland, Washington, U.S.
- Denomination: Nondenominational
- Website: churchome.org

History
- Former name: The City Church
- Founded: 1992
- Founder(s): Wendell Smith, Gini Smith

Clergy
- Pastor(s): Judah Smith, Chelsea Smith

Churchome, known as The City Church until 2017, is an American nondenominational megachurch headquartered in Kirkland, Washington, with a congregation in Beverly Hills, California and a mobile-app ministry called Churchome Global. Founded in 1992 by Wendell and Gini Smith, the church has been led since 2009 by their son Judah Smith and his wife, Chelsea Smith.

Beginning with about 40 people meeting in a hotel function room in Bellevue, the congregation grew over two decades into one of the largest churches in the Seattle metropolitan area, reaching roughly 6,000 weekly attendees across six campuses by the early 2010s. The church later became an early adopter of app-based ministry, and its congregation has included public figures such as Justin Bieber and Russell Wilson, a profile that led media outlets to describe it as a "celebrity megachurch". It has also been the subject of scrutiny over its handling of sexual-assault allegations involving staff, a class-action lawsuit alleging that it required employees to tithe, and its former membership of the Hillsong Church "Family" network.

== History ==
=== Founding and early growth (1992–1999) ===
Wendell and Gini Smith worked for about two decades at Bible Temple, later City Bible Church, in Portland, Oregon, where they worked as youth pastors, elders and Bible college instructors before moving north. They founded The City Church in 1992, beginning with about 40 people who met on Sunday mornings at the Bellevue Marriott. The name was drawn from a passage in the Book of Isaiah.

The congregation grew quickly. By 1997 it reported about 1,550 members, with about 500 people attending each of three weekend services at an auditorium near 148th Avenue Northeast and Main Street in Bellevue. That year the church agreed to acquire the Rose Hill campus of Overlake Christian Church at 9051 132nd Avenue NE in Kirkland, which had been placed on the market after Overlake built a larger facility in Redmond. When Wendell Smith announced the plan from the pulpit, members pledged more than $250,000 in a weekend; the church agreed to pay $8.25 million for the property, whose sanctuary seats 2,200. Contemporary reporting noted the congregation's ethnic diversity and its emphasis on member recruitment, and quoted neighbouring Eastside clergy who described the church as an addition to the region rather than a competitor.

Alongside the congregation, the Smiths established City Ministries, an outreach arm that during the 1990s operated a food program, a low-cost resale clothing shop, a computer-skills certification course and a transitional home for women and children; a preschool, later City Kids School, opened after the move to the Eastside.

=== Expansion and leadership transition (2000–2016) ===
The church expanded to multiple campuses across the Seattle area and developed youth, children's and internship programs. Judah Smith led the youth ministry for about ten years before he and Chelsea Smith were named lead pastors in 2009, after Wendell Smith, who had been diagnosed with cancer in 2004, stepped back from the role. Wendell Smith died in December 2010 at age 60. The family directed memorial giving toward Rose Hill Cottages, a nonprofit providing housing for foster families in the Seattle area.

By 2014 about 6,000 people attended weekly services across campuses in Kirkland, the Sammamish Plateau, Seattle's Central District, Belltown and the University District. A church spokesman told a Seattle community newspaper that weekly in-house television simulcasts reached an estimated audience of 25,000, and Judah Smith said his podcast reached about 30,000 listeners.

=== Rebranding and digital expansion (2017–2020) ===
In 2017, 25 years after its founding, the church was renamed Churchome, and a Los Angeles congregation was established. Judah Smith said the change was intended to convey a church that functions like a home rather than an institution. For a period the Smiths travelled between the two cities, leading Sunday services in the Seattle area and midweek services in Los Angeles.

In November 2018 the church launched Churchome Global, a free smartphone application with streamed services, guided prayers, discussion groups and a pastoral chat function. Judah Smith described the app as a church plant located on the user's phone, and said it was developed in response to members, particularly younger ones, who no longer attended a physical building. The app was downloaded more than 200,000 times in its first year.

The approach drew attention when the COVID-19 pandemic moved most American congregations online in 2020, as commentators noted that Churchome had built its digital infrastructure years earlier. The church closed its Washington campuses in March 2020 and launched Church@Home for virtual attendance. Guided prayers from the app reached a wider audience when Justin Bieber shared recordings with his Instagram following.

=== Consolidation (2020–present) ===
The church subsequently reduced its physical footprint, closing several Seattle-area campuses and shifting resources toward its online platform. In 2020 it moved to demolish and sell its University District property, while retaining holdings including the former IBEW hall at 2700 First Avenue in Belltown.

By 2023 Churchome held weekly services at its Kirkland campus and monthly services in Beverly Hills, and reported that more than 300,000 people engaged with its services online or in person each week. Videos on its YouTube channel had accumulated roughly 33 million views, including a service performance by Bieber and worship leader Chandler Moore viewed nearly 14 million times.

== Campuses ==
Churchome's main campus is the former Overlake Christian Church property in the Rose Hill neighbourhood of Kirkland, purchased in the late 1990s. Its Southern California congregation meets monthly in Beverly Hills, with services held at venues including the Saban Theatre. Earlier campuses in Belltown, the University District, the Central District, Issaquah and on the Sammamish Plateau operated during the church's multi-site period.

== Beliefs and practices ==
Churchome is nondenominational and charismatic evangelical in orientation. Its preaching centres on the person of Jesus and on grace rather than on doctrinal systems, and its public messaging emphasises belonging; the church's website has greeted visitors with the statement that they are welcome there.

The church's statement of faith and employee handbook include tithing, described as giving the first ten percent of income.

Women work in senior roles: Chelsea Smith is co-leader with the title "lead theologian", women sit on the board and preach at services, and the church has licensed women as ministers. The advocacy group Church Clarity scored the church's website "Clear: Egalitarian" on women in leadership.

Churchome ended its affiliation with Hillsong Church in January 2022.

Churchome has been criticized for declining to state publicly whether LGBTQ people may be baptized, married, employed or hold leadership positions in the church. In a 2016 interview with MTV News, Judah Smith said he did not want to address divisive issues or make blanket statements, and said the church had no written policy on gay leadership. After a December 2016 sermon in which he said Jesus opposes all forms of exclusion, Smith was publicly asked whether this extended to LGBTQ participation; he did not answer, deleted the associated post, and the sermon was later reposted with that passage removed. The episode contributed to the founding of Church Clarity, which scored the church's website "Undisclosed" — its least transparent rating — on LGBTQ policy.

== Organization ==
Churchome was incorporated as a nonprofit religious corporation under Washington law in 1992. Judah Smith uses the title "lead communicator" and Chelsea Smith "lead theologian"; David Kroll is chief executive officer. The board of directors has ten members, including the Smiths, Kroll and NFL quarterback Russell Wilson. In 2023 an attorney for a plaintiff suing the church estimated its staff at 80 to 100 employees following campus closures.

=== Handling of sexual-assault allegations ===
In February 2023, The Roys Report, an investigative outlet covering evangelicalism, reported that Churchome had rehired Braylon Oliver, a former campus pastor, in 2022, three years after an independent investigation commissioned by the church found a preponderance of evidence that he had raped a woman connected to the congregation. The report stated that the alleged victim had objected to his return. The Smiths declined to be interviewed; according to the investigator's summary, Oliver said he had no recollection of the alleged incident. Oliver resigned less than two weeks later.

Later reporting by the same outlet described accounts from former participants in the church's internship program who said their reports of sexual assault were mishandled, including one woman who said she was expelled from the program for drinking alcohol after reporting a rape. Churchome said it had no knowledge of one allegation, and that in another case it advised the woman to report the matter to police, conducted an internal investigation and found her account credible.

=== Employee tithing lawsuit ===
In March 2023, Churchome employee Rachel Kellogg filed a proposed class action in King County Superior Court against the church, Judah and Chelsea Smith, and David Kroll. The complaint alleged that the church required staff to return at least ten percent of their gross wages each month or face pressure, discipline or termination, conduct it characterized as a "systemic scheme of wage and hour abuse" in breach of Washington's Wage Rebate Act and Consumer Protection Act.

Kellogg said the requirement was not disclosed in the job posting or during orientation, and that she learned of it at an April 2020 staff videoconference at which Judah Smith said employees had previously been dismissed for not tithing. She said she received a written reprimand after suspending her payments following a 2020 car accident.

Through counsel, Churchome said tithing had long appeared in its statement of faith and employee handbook, that it does not deduct tithes from paychecks but asks employees to practice the church's teaching, and that the First Amendment protects a religious organization's right to limit employment to those who abide by its beliefs. The church said the Smiths, Kroll and other staff also tithe. As of May 2025, The Independent reported that the outcome of the case was unclear.

=== Hillsong "Family" payments ===
Whistleblower documents tabled in the Parliament of Australia by independent MP Andrew Wilkie in March 2023 showed that Churchome was among roughly 40 congregations worldwide paying annual fees — up to US$100,000, or three percent of tithes and offerings — for membership of the Hillsong Family network. The whistleblower alleged the network operated as a reciprocal speaking circuit producing large honorariums for prominent pastors; reporting on the documents indicated that Judah Smith received five-figure fees for Hillsong engagements and that Churchome paid comparable sums to Brian Houston. A church spokesperson said Churchome had ended the affiliation in January 2022.

== Notable attendees ==
Figures reported to have attended Churchome services include Justin Bieber, Hailey Bieber, Russell Wilson, Ciara, Bubba Watson, Kourtney Kardashian and Maria Shriver. Judah Smith officiated the Biebers' 2019 wedding and baptized the couple the following year, and Bieber has led worship at church services. In 2023, Lana Del Rey included a recording of a Churchome sermon, titled "Judah Smith Interlude", on her album Did You Know That There's a Tunnel Under Ocean Blvd.

== See also ==
- List of megachurches in the United States
- Hillsong Church
