= Colette Hayman =

Australian fashion designer

Colette Hayman is an Australian fashion designer. She and her husband founded the fashion accessories chains Diva and Colette by Colette Hayman.

== Life and career ==
Colette Hayman was born in South Africa. While working as a part-time model and retail sales assistant, she met her future husband Mark Hayman on a modelling shoot. She joined his clothing manufacturing business where she later became in charge of design and buying. She has three daughters. Hayman lived in the UK for seven years where she ran French Connection stores. The family moved to Australia in 2000.

In 2002, Hayman and her husband founded Diva, a fashion accessories chain. The couple sold Diva to BB Retail Capital in November 2007.

In 2010, she founded Colette Accessories, a retailer of affordable and trendy handbags, jewellery and fashion accessories. Hayman described the brand as "a more grown up version of Diva". In 2012, the label was renamed Colette by Colette Hayman. In February 2017, IFM Investors purchased a minority stake in the company. The retailer entered voluntary administration in February 2020 and was purchased by an investor group led by Bernie Brookes and John Skellern in September 2020. The company's 138 store count was reduced to 35 stores across Australia and New Zealand as part of a restructure.

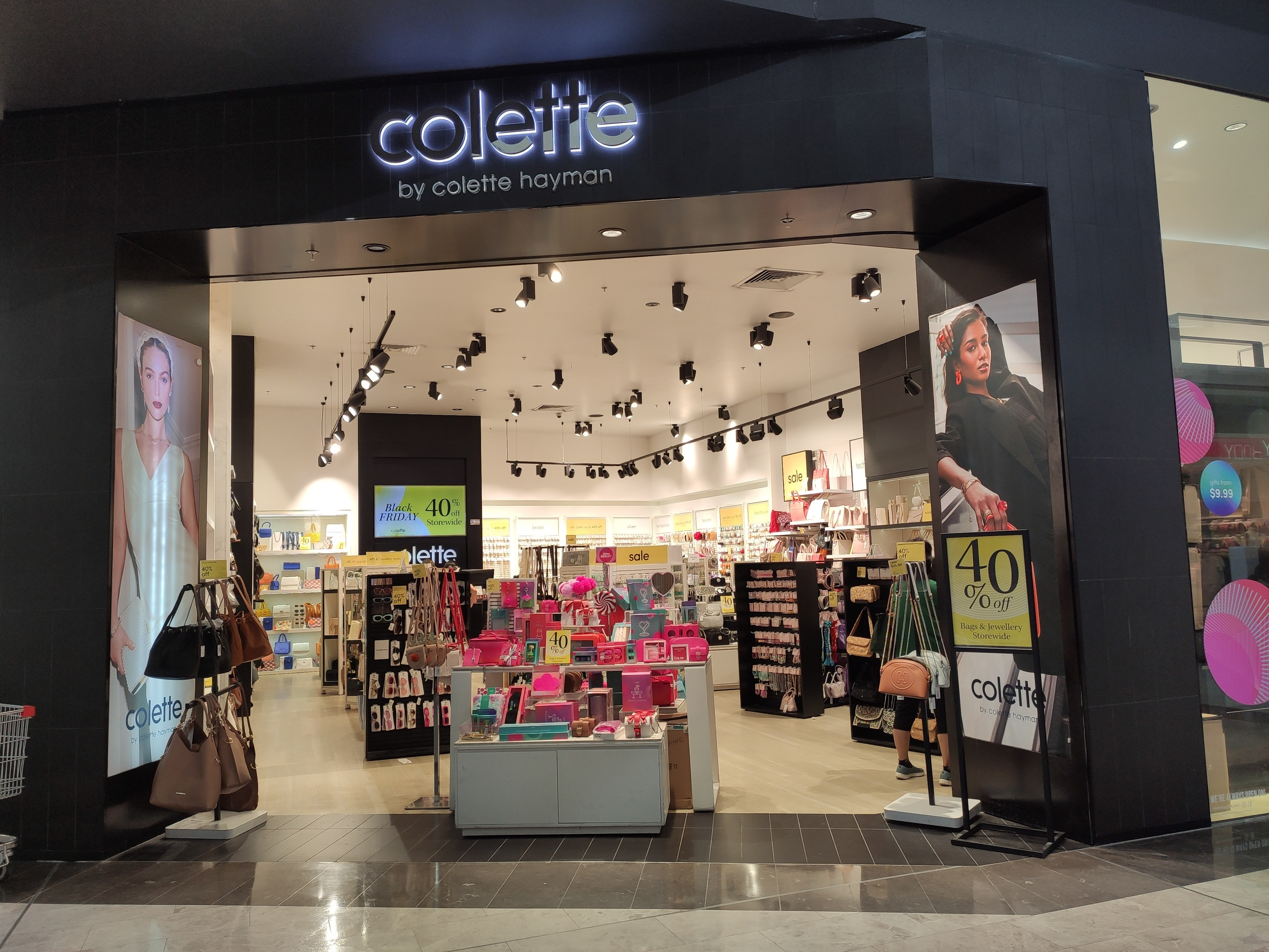
Colette by Colette Hayman store in Westfield Carousel

Colette by Colette Hayman became part of Brooke's Marquee Retail Group (MRG) in March 2023, along with The Daily Edited. In April 2024, MRG went into voluntary administration. It exited administration in June 2024. MRG collapsed in 2025 and Colette was put into liquidation. In September 2025, the Colette and The Daily Edited brands were acquired by Group48. The company plans to relaunch Colette as an online-only business.
