= Green-Works =

GreenWorks
- Industry: Recycling
- Founded: 2000
- Headquarters: Hoxton, United Kingdom
- Products: Furniture
- Website: www.green-works.co.uk

Green-Works is a British charity that attempts to reduce waste by encouraging the reuse of office furniture. Unused furniture sent to Green-Works by other UK-based organizations is resold typically at a lower price. In 2011, Green-Works was taken over by London Re-use Limited.

== History ==
The company started off in 2000 with a £400 capital and a van. In 2007, its turn-over was £2.1 million.

In the Autumn of 2011 Green-Works was taken over by London Re-use Limited and now forms the commercial division of that organisation.

== Social impact ==
In 2006, DELCE Primary School had purchased new furniture for its reception area, as well as other furniture for staff. They had purchased it at an affordable price without being detrimental to the education of children.

Since starting up in 2000, Green-Works has taken more than 60,000 tonnes of furniture. When a product cannot be sold, it is dismantled and recycled. This procedure has given Green-Works a coveted Queen's Award. Green-Works has saved around £2.5 million from others buying their recycled materials.

Green-Works, along with NGO Construction & Development Partnership (CODEP), and Build on Books (BoB) delivered 200,000 books to 100 schools in Waterloo, Sierra Leone, helping illiterate children in the country. A further 500,000 books are to be delivered in 2010 to enhance the 'book to person' ratio in the country.

Green-Works also donates furniture to other projects.
