= The Daily Edited =

Australia luxury fashion brand

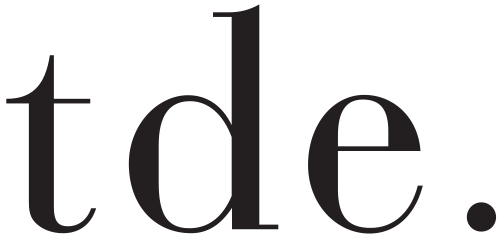
- Type: Private
- Industry: Retail
- Founded: August 2014; 12 years ago
- Founders: Alyce Tran; Tania Liu
- Headquarters: Sydney, Australia
- Products: Luxury goods
- Revenue: $30 million (2018)
- Owner: Group48
- Website: www.thedailyedited.com

The Daily Edited (TDE) is an Australian luxury fashion brand specializing in monogrammable leather goods. Based in Sydney, Australia, their products are available both online and in stores in Australia, Singapore, and the United States.

It sells embossed and personalised women's and men's leather goods, stationery and desk accessories, including bags, pouches, clutches, wallets, phone cases, diaries and overnight bags. The brand is known for its focus on individuality and personalisation, reflecting its ethos that “you can make it your own”.

== History ==
TDE was founded by Alyce Tran and Tania Liu while the two were working as lawyers at Allens in Perth.

It was initially launched on Instagram in 2011 as a lifestyle blog and fashion label, before rearticulating itself as an online leather goods brand in August 2014. It soon expanded, selling personalised leather goods through in-store through a partnership with David Jones, in Sydney, Melbourne, Adelaide, and Brisbane.

They have opened stand alone Flagship stores at Chadstone Shopping Centre in Melbourne, Pitt Street Mall in Sydney's CBD and on Bleecker Street in New York; they have a new flagship store opening in the Queen Victoria Building in Sydney’s CBD in 2021.

In the past the brand has also partnered with department stores in Singapore at Robinsons and Tangs. In December 2022, a month after being placed under administration and put up for sale, TDE was acquired by BJM and managed by another brand in its portfolio, Colette by Colette Hayman.

In 2025, the Daily Edited and Colette brands were acquired by Group48. The company plans to relaunch TDE as an online-only business.

== Notable brand representatives ==
Lara Bingle, an Australian model and media personality, was featured in TDE's Summer Christmas campaign in December 2015. American model Hailey Baldwin collaborated with The Daily Edited in 2016, promoting a collection labeled as #theHAILEYedited.

In 2017 the Stallone Sisters, Sistine, Sophia, and Scarlet, the three daughters of movie star Sylvester Stallone, were featured in the #MeetTheStallones campaign promoting a new capsule collection for TDE.

Most recently US actor and supermodel Amber Valletta was featured in the Amber In Residence campaign for the brand.
