= Overlake Christian Church =

Coordinates: 47.6891°N 122.14°W

Overlake Christian Church is a non-denominational megachurch in Redmond, Washington.

== Mission ==
The church's purpose statement is to: Love God, Love People & Serve the World. Weekend services for adults, students and children are considered the main venues where the Love God purpose is fulfilled. Life Groups (small community groups and support groups) are viewed as the fundamental way the church shows its love and concern for people. The church's Serve the World purpose is accomplished through various initiatives (throughout the Pacific Northwest and the world); the primary of which are centered on HIV/AIDS, human trafficking, and orphan care through fostering and adoption. The church also has a major focus on assisting unhoused people and single mothers in the Puget Sound region.

== Leadership ==
The Lead Pastors are Neely McQueen and Patrick Swanson, who previously served as pastors in Overlake's Student and Community Ministries, respectively. Mike Howerton, who was the "Next Generation" pastor at Saddleback Church (pastored by Rick Warren) in Orange County, California until 2004, served as Overlake's Lead Pastor until stepping down in 2020. Howerton has authored three books, Ride of Your Life, Glorious Mess and Miles to Cross, and was a contributing author to another entitled, The Relevant Church. The church is governed by a volunteer board of elders.

== History ==
Overlake Christian Church began in Kirkland, Washington, in 1969 with a handful of former attendees of Bellevue Christian Church. James Earl Ladd, then president of Puget Sound College of the Bible in the nearby city of Mountlake Terrace, agreed to serve as a temporary, part-time pastor/preacher until a replacement could be found. A pastor from Enid, Oklahoma, Bob Moorehead, was invited and became Overlake's Senior Pastor in January, 1970. During the nearly thirty years of Moorehead's tenure, weekly attendance at the Kirkland church campus grew from less than a hundred to more than 6,000. He resigned in 1998 amid allegations of sexual impropriety, mostly related to the 1970s, that he had touched or fondled male members of the congregation. The elders of the church exonerated Moorehead in the results of their initial investigation, but a year after he resigned they withdrew their support, saying they had discovered new evidence that showed he "did violate the scriptural standards of trust, self-control, purity and godly character required for the office of elder and pastor." As a conservative Christian, condemnation of homosexuality had been a major theme of his preaching.

In 1997, the church moved to a new 250,000 square foot building on 27 acres, along Willows Road NE in Redmond, Washington. After Moorehead's departure in June 1998, the senior pastor's role was filled by Rick Kingham, a former Vice President of Promise Keepers, who led the congregation until February 2007, and Mike Howerton, who was the church's lead pastor from that year until March 2020. Neely McQueen and Patrick Swanson became the church's first lead pastors under a co-lead tandem in November 2020, the former becoming the first female to serve as a lead pastor in Overlake.

In addition to the Bob Moorehead scandal, the church was again under public investigation in 2007, when $75,000 taken up as an offering from church members and visitors for victims of the 2004 Indian Ocean tsunami and Hurricane Katrina in 2005 was instead used to pay church expenses, including salaries. Bob Senatore, then chairman of the board of elders, stated that the church has borrowed from restricted funds before, and it was not improper to do so.

Overlake Christian Church has founded eight other churches in the area, the largest having more than 3,800 Sunday attendees.
