= Patricio Manuel =

American professional boxer (born 1985)

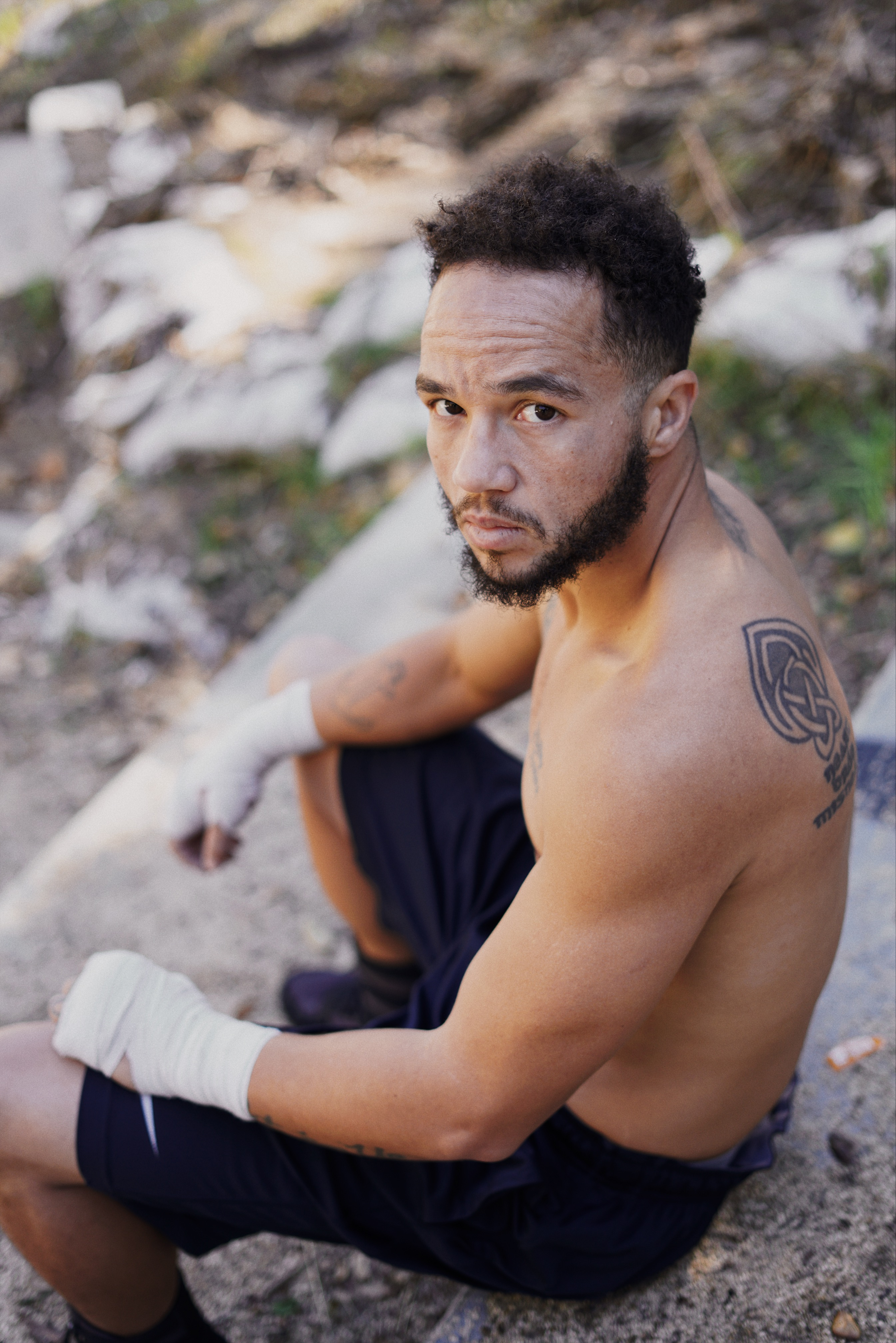
- Patricio Manuel in 2018

Personal information
- Nickname: Cacahuate
- Born: July 22, 1985 (age 41) Santa Monica, California, U.S.
- Height: 5 ft 6 in (168 cm)
- Weight: Super featherweight

Boxing career
- Stance: Orthodox

Boxing record
- Total fights: 4
- Wins: 3
- Losses: 1

Patricio Manuel (born July 22, 1985), nicknamed "Cacahuate", is an American professional boxer. In 2018, he became the first transgender boxer to fight professionally in the United States.

== Career ==
Manuel made his professional debut on a Golden Boy Promotions event on December 8, 2018 in Indio, California, scoring a four-round unanimous decision victory over Hugo Aguilar, with all three judges scoring the bout 39–37. Aguilar only knew of Manuel's transition two days prior to the bout. He stated "For me it's very respectable ... It doesn't change anything for me. In the ring he wants to win and I want to win too."

In May 2019, Manuel was a keynote speaker at the launch event for the San Francisco 49ers LGBTQ+ and allies fan club, held at Levi's Stadium.

In September 2019, Manuel became the new face of Everlast boxing equipment.

In March 2023, Manuel won his second professional bout against Hien Huynh by technical decision (cut caused by a headclash).

In June 2023, Manuel participated in Golden Boy Fight Night where he won by unanimous decision against Alexander Gutierrez.

In April 2024, Manuel participated again in Golden Boy Fight Night and was knocked out (TKO) after 21 seconds into the first round by his opponent Joshua Bryan Reyes. The bout, part of the Golden Boy Fight Night card at Fantasy Springs Resort Casino, marked a significant moment as Manuel, the first openly transgender boxer in U.S. history, faced his most accomplished opponent to date.

In July 2026, Manuel announced his retirement from boxing.

== Transition ==
Manuel came out as a trans man after being a five-time national amateur champion, as well as competing in the 2012 Women's U.S. Olympic Trials. Manuel was eliminated from those trials after being forced to withdraw due to receiving a shoulder injury. He began his transition with hormone treatments in 2013, and he had top surgery in Salt Lake City in 2014.

== Personal life ==
As of 2017, Manuel resides with his partner and their pit bull, Ginkgo, in California, maintaining a private personal life. Known by his boxing nickname "Cacahuate" (Spanish for "peanut"), he continues training under coach Victor Valenzuela in Duarte, California, with a focus on resilience despite career challenges. His advocacy and visibility as the first openly transgender professional boxer in the U.S. have made him a significant figure in both sports and social justice.

== Advocacy and public profile ==
Manuel has emerged as a prominent advocate for LGBTQ+ rights, speaking at events like the San Francisco 49ers LGBTQ+ fan club launch in May 2019 and becoming the face of Everlast's "Be First" campaign in September 2019. His journey has been featured in major media outlets, including The Los Angeles Times, ESPN, HBO, and a Webby Award-winning VICE documentary, "Identify." Despite facing discrimination, including opponents refusing to fight him and public criticism, Manuel remains committed to promoting inclusivity in sports.

== Professional boxing record ==
4 fights	3 wins	1 loss
By knockout	0	1
By decision	3	0

No.	Result	Record	Opponent	Type	Round, time	Date	Location	Notes
4	Loss	3–1	Joshua Brian Reyes	TKO	1	April 4, 2024	Fantasy Springs Casino, Indio, California, U.S.	Part of the Golden Boy Fight Night undercard; first-round TKO after Reyes landed a sharp punch to Manuel’s chin, marking Manuel’s first professional loss.
3	Win	3–0	Alexander Gutierrez	UD	4	Jun, 8 2023	Fantasy Springs Casino, Indio, California, U.S.	
2	Win	2–0	Hien Huynh	TD	4	Mar, 18 2023	Walter Pyramid, Long Beach, U.S.	
1	Win	1–0	Hugo Aguilar	UD	4	Dec 8, 2018	Fantasy Springs Casino, Indio, California, U.S.	

== See also ==
- Parinya Charoenphol, Thai boxer and kathoey
- Fallon Fox, the first openly transgender MMA athlete
