= Nick Vlahos =

American businessman

- Born: Nikolaos Vlahos
- Education: Indiana University Bloomington
- Occupation: Businessman
- Known for: Rhode

Nick Vlahos is an American businessman and the chief executive officer of Rhode. Vlahos formerly was the Chief Executive Officer of the Honest Company and chief operating officer of the Clorox Company.

== Career ==
Vlahos began his career at Helene Curtis Industries for the brands Suave, Finesse and Salon Selectives.

In 1995, Vlahos joined Clorox as a household-products regional sales manager and held many roles over his time with the company. In 2011, Vlahos was appointed chief executive officer of Burt's Bees, a Clorox company, serving in the role until 2013. Then, in 2013 he was promoted to chief customer officer of Clorox, later being promoted to chief operating officer. As COO, he oversaw marketing, sales, research and development, and product supply.

In 2017, Vlahos was appointed CEO of The Honest Company, a consumer products company founded by Jessica Alba. He also joined Honest Company's board of directors.

Vlahos is also a board advisor for Tillamook Dairy and sits on the board of the Consumer Brands Association.

== Personal life ==
Vlahos graduated from Indiana University Bloomington.
