= Christopher Gavigan =

American entrepreneur

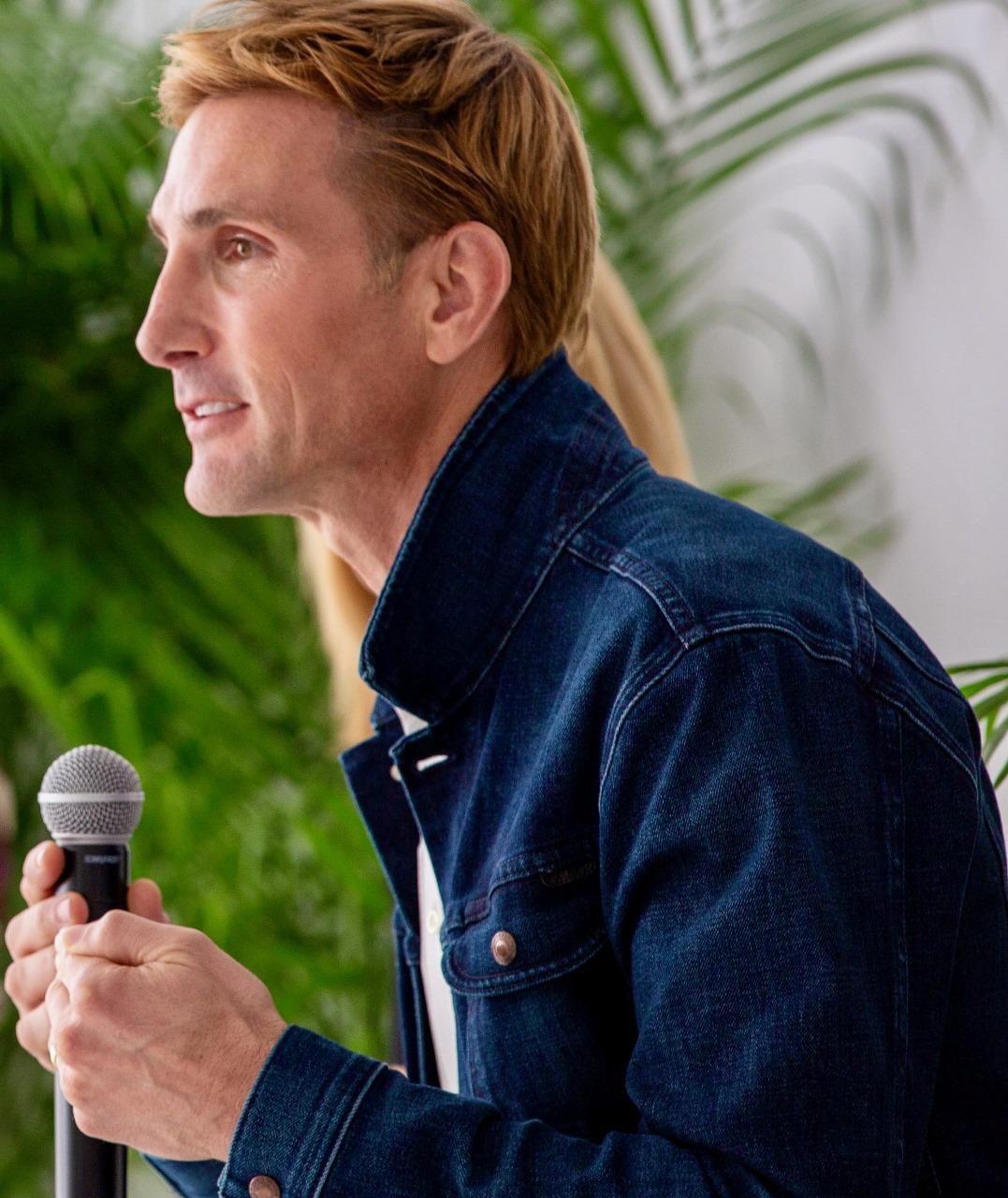
- Born: April 19, 1974 (age 52); United States
- Education: University of California, Santa Barbara
- Occupations: Entrepreneur, author
- Spouse: Jessica Capshaw (m. 2004)
- Children: 4
- Relatives: Kate Capshaw (mother-in-law)

Christopher Gavigan (born April 19, 1974) is an American entrepreneur, author, and one of the co-founders of The Honest Company. He is also the founder and CEO of Prima and CEO of Healthy Child Healthy World.

== Early life and education ==
He was born and raised in New York and Connecticut. He received degrees in environmental science and geography from the University of California, Santa Barbara, and has graduate training in child psychology and education.

Early in his career, Gavigan was also an Ecology and Science teacher in Los Angeles and the San Francisco Bay Area. He also founded Pinnacle Expeditions, a California-based adventure travel company catering to teens.

== Career ==
=== Healthy Child Healthy World ===
Before launching his business ventures, Gavigan served in the areas of non-profit advocacy work as the CEO and Executive Director of Healthy Child Healthy World. The organization focuses on protecting children from environmental toxins through advocacy, medical research, legislative efforts, and public education. His work included lobbying for chemical safety standards and promoting safer consumer products.

Gavigan authored the book Healthy Child Healthy World: Creating a Cleaner, Greener, Safer Home in 2008 with foreword written by Meryl Streep. The book featured contributions from Michelle Obama, Gwyneth Paltrow, Tom Hanks, Meryl Streep, Erin Brockovich, Philip Landrigan, and Harvey Karp.

=== The Honest Company ===
In January 2012, Gavigan along with his business partners Jessica Alba and Brian Lee co-founded The Honest Company.

Gavigan's role at The Honest Company included serving as Chief Product and Brand Officer, where he focused on building company's principles of safety, transparency, sustainability, and integrity.

In 2021, The Honest Company went public with an initial public offering (IPO), marking a growth. Gavigan continued to be involved with the company.

=== Prima ===
In 2019, Gavigan was the founder and CEO of Prima, a botanical wellness brand, called The Patagonia of CBD by Forbes in 2021, leveraging cannabinoid and plant therapeutics which was sold in Sephora, Goop Vitamin Shoppe, and Whole Foods.

== Views and opinions ==
Gavigan has emphasized the importance of protecting children and families from exposure to harmful chemicals. He has advocated for stricter chemical regulations and increased consumer awareness about environmental toxins.

Gavigan has criticized the outdated nature of chemical and product safety regulations, particularly in the United States. He argues that “the system is broken, leaving consumers vulnerable to harmful substances.”

=== Bibliography ===
- Healthy Child Healthy World: Creating a Cleaner, Greener, Safer Home (2008)

== Personal life ==
Gavigan married actress Jessica Capshaw, daughter of Kate Capshaw and stepdaughter of Steven Spielberg, in 2004. They have four children together.

== Awards and recognition ==
- Green Award 2007 by Elle
- WebMD's 2010 Health Hero Award
- Entrepreneur of the Year by Ernst and Young in April 2014.
- University of California: Outstanding Alumni Award -Environmental Sciences in 2019.
