= E.l.f. =

American cosmetics brand

e.l.f. Beauty, Inc.
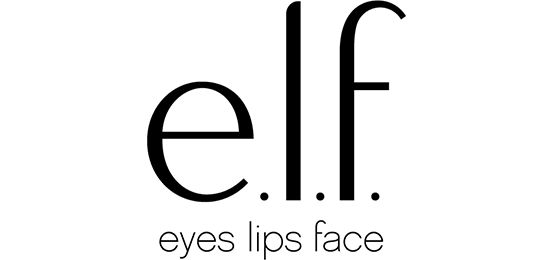
- Type: Public
- Traded as: NYSE: ELF; S&P 400 component
- Industry: Cosmetics
- Founded: June 2004; 22 years ago
- Founders: Joseph Shamah; Fr. Scott-Vincent Borba
- Headquarters: Oakland, California, U.S.
- Area served: Worldwide
- Key people: Tarang Amin (CEO); Mandy Fields (Senior Vice President, CFO); Kory Marchisotto (Senior Vice President, CMO); Scott Milsten (Senior Vice President, General Counsel & CPO)
- Products: Makeup, bath products, skin-care products
- Revenue: ▲US$1.64 billion (2026)
- Net income: ▼US$26.3 million (2026)
- Number of employees: 475 (2024)
- Website: www.elfbeauty.com
- Footnotes; Financials as of March 31, 2024.

e.l.f. Beauty, Inc. is an American cosmetics brand based in Oakland, California. It was founded by Joseph Shamah and Scott Vincent Borba in 2004. The company sells bath and skin-care products, mineral-based makeup, professional tools, eyeliners, lipstick, glosses, blushes, bronzers, brushes and mascara. Its products are sold in 18 countries and in several stores, including Target, CVS, Sephora, and Walmart. Over half the company's sales come from its website, which is also as a social networking site with over two million members.

== History and operations ==
e.l.f. (short for Eyes Lips Face) Cosmetics was founded by Joseph Shamah and businessman Scott-Vincent Borba in June 2004, with the assistance of Shamah's father, Alan.

On February 3, 2014, TPG Growth bought a majority stake in e.l.f. Cosmetics. Joey Shamah was replaced by Tarang P. Amin as president, chief executive officer, and director.

In August 2023, the company acquired the West Hollywood-headquartered skin-care brand, Naturium, for $355 million. The acquisition was finalized in October 2023.

In April 2025, British professional auto racing driver Katherine Legge, supported by E.l.f. Cosmetics, competed in at least seven NASCAR National Series events, including a return to the NASCAR Cup Series in Mexico City in June of the same year. E.l.f. was the first beauty brand to sponsor a driver and activate at the Indianapolis 500.

In May 2025, E.l.f. Cosmetics became the first beauty sponsor of the National Women’s Soccer League (NWSL) in a three-year deal starting with the NWSL Challenge Cup. The partnership includes a talent development initiative, the “Glow for Glory Contest,” and content collaboration with Footballco. It aims to support young female athletes and promote leadership through sports.

E.l.f. announced on May 28, 2025 that it intended to acquire Rhode, Hailey Bieber's beauty brand, for up to $1 billion. The acquisition was completed in August. E.l.f. plans to expand the Rhode brand into European Sephora Stores in 2026.

== Products ==
The company started with only 13 makeup products, but has since developed more than 300 products that include bath products, skin-care products, mineral-based makeup, professional tools, eyeliners, lipstick, glosses, blushes, bronzers, brushes, mascara, and many more. Most items are considered affordable, with an average retail price of $9. The variety of e.l.f. products allows the company to target a demographic with a broad age range, from teenagers to women in their 40s and 50s. According to the company, all its products are vegan and free of animal testing. The company supports PETA's no fur campaign and has been reviewed in Glamour, Allure, Self, InStyle, and Good Housekeeping.

In 2011, the company carried different product lines, which include e.l.f. Studio, e.l.f. Minerals, and e.l.f. Essentials.

In 2011, e.l.f. Cosmetics had three different lines:

- e.l.f. Studio – makeup line includes professional makeup for professional makeup artists and consumers.
- e.l.f. Minerals – consists of makeup made out of natural minerals.
- e.l.f. Essentials – includes "every-day" makeup supplies at lower prices, in an effort to be affordable.

As of 2023, the company has only two product designations, e.l.f. Cosmetics and e.l.f. Skin. The latter is a skin-care line similar to the discontinued e.l.f Bath & Body line, both including moisturizers, cleansers, and other skincare products.

In January 2026, e.l.f. Cosmetics announced its first fragrance collection through a limited-edition collaboration with H&M. The partnership marked e.l.f.’s first fragrance release and its first global collaboration with a fashion retailer.

== Sales ==
=== Retail ===
e.l.f. Cosmetics is currently available in 18 countries including the United States, Canada, Australia, the United Kingdom, Saudi Arabia, France, Colombia, and Spain. Products can be purchased at regional drug chains across the United States and Canada. e.l.f products are most commonly found in Target. In March 2010, e.l.f.'s $1 and Studio line of products were placed in over 700 Target stores, with most individual items prices at $1 and $3. Another Target expansion to include most outlets happened in March 2011. Other stores include Ulta, Dollar General, and Walmart. e.l.f. is also sold at various supermarkets and women's apparel discount retailers, often in four-tiered spinners or "fish bowls" in impulse-buy sections.

=== Website ===
==== History ====
In 2004, the company was having only partial success stocking its products in retail stores, including dollar stores. Glamour magazine wanted to feature an e.l.f. product but told the company they couldn't unless the product was nationally available for their 2 million-person readership base. e.l.f. Cosmetics at that point had a website intended as a product showcase, and that year it relaunched the site as an e-commerce site, quickly shipping out thousands of orders. Since the premiere of the new site, e.l.f. products have been featured in Glamour over seven times. The website is now the brand's primary sales vehicle and accounted for approximately 50% of all sales in 2008.

==== Features ====
In June 2007, e.l.f. launched a beauty blog and advice column that touts products (not only e.l.f.) and talks about celebrity sightings. Since then, the length of customer visits to the website has tripled. All product pages on the site host a "chat now" button that lets customers connect directly with one of the company's in-house professional makeup artists. The site hosts a "virtual makeover lab", where customers can digitally test products on models or their own photos. Customers can create a personal profile, publish and comment on blogs, converse with other customers, and access a beauty encyclopedia. They can also create a "beauty profile" and are recommended e.l.f. products according to their skin type, hair and eye colors, and typical beauty regimen. Also included is the option to create a wish-list that connects to Facebook, or view educational web videos on makeup techniques and styles. The website currently includes over 2 million members.

==== Promotions ====
In 2007, the company began to invest heavily in email marketing, and its weekly email campaigns are considered by eCommerce-Guide to be the company's strongest promotion. Subscribers on the mailing list can earn points or gift certificates for making web referrals that turn into sales transactions. Shamah claimed that as of September 2009, more than 500,000 friend referrals had come back to make a purchase.

It also frequently hosts online events, and since 2010 has asked customers of all ages and ethnicities to submit to a casting resource to select a yearly model representative for the brand. Four selected individuals are brought to New York City to receive makeovers from Achelle Dunaway, e.l.f.'s Creative Director and lead makeup artist, as well as participate in a photo shoot. There are various cash prizes for nominees, and the winner is dubbed "face of e.l.f."

== Media presence and sponsorship ==
e.l.f. products have been favorably reviewed in dozens of major magazines, including Glamour, Allure, Self, InStyle, and Good Housekeeping. A segment on e.l.f. premiered on the Style Network as well. The business has been profiled by publications such as Entrepreneur, CNN, Retail Merchandiser, Information Week, and The Wall Street Journal. In December 2010, the e.l.f. product '100-Piece Endless Eyes Pro Eyeshadow Palette' was featured in "The O List: Holiday Edition" ("Oprah's Favorite Things") in Oprah Winfrey's O magazine. In January 2011, e.l.f. reintroduced the product at half price, or $10.

In April 2023, e.l.f. debuted a digital series, "Vanity Table Talk", which will be released monthly on YouTube, Instagram, and TikTok. The first episode featured actress Jennifer Coolidge.

In November 2023, e.l.f created the Roblox experience "e.l.f UP!", a Roblox tycoon game where players become entrepreneurs.

For the 108th Running of the Indianapolis 500 in 2024, e.l.f sponsored the No. 51 IndyCar of Katherine Legge, becoming the first beauty brand to be a primary sponsor in the Indianapolis 500. This partnership (according to a report to investors) started after the previous years Indy 500.

e.l.f further sponsored Katherine Legge's racing for 2025, this time in NASCAR (both the Cup and Xfinity Series) for at least seven races starting at the Xfinity Series' return to Rockingham Speedway in April.

On August 10, 2025, e.l.f. released an ad with comedian Matt Rife and drag queen Heidi N Closet playing lawyers who were fighting beauty injustices and overpriced products. The ad gained controversy as Matt Rife has made sexist jokes that involved body shaming women, shaming women who were OnlyFans models, and made a domestic violence joke to open his comedy special. e.l.f released a statement on Instagram saying, "You know us, we're always listening, and we've heard you. This campaign aimed to humorously spotlight beauty injustice. We understand we missed the mark with people we care about in our e.l.f. community."

== Campaigns ==
=== Breast cancer funds ===
During October 2004, just months after its founding, e.l.f. donated 20% of the proceeds from its 'Shimmering Facial Whip' to Win Against Breast Cancer's research and facilities. It also provided "Color Therapy Care Packages" to breast cancer patients in inner-city hospitals in Los Angeles.

=== PETA ===
The brand only uses products that are cruelty-free. In 2007, it was announced that e.l.f. was selling tweezers in a faux leather case that read "e.l.f. Professional Supports PETA in the Fur Free Campaign. 50% of the proceeds from sales of these tweezers go straight to PETA!" CEO Joseph Shamah later earned PETA's "Trail-Blazer Award", given for "compassion and commitment to never testing on animals."

=== 2011 Japan earthquake and tsunami ===
e.l.f. Cosmetics announced the "Mi & You Can Make a Difference" campaign days after the 2011 Tōhoku earthquake and tsunami disaster, which helped fund relief efforts. The program donated 5% of all online purchases to the Red Cross for Japan's crisis recovery initiative.

=== So Many Dicks ===
In 2024, e.l.f. conducted an advertising campaign entitled "So Many Dicks" that highlighted "that nearly as many men named Richard, Rick or Dick served on public US company boards as women altogether". e.l.f. cites its loyal customer base in and CEO Tarang Amin has stated the company is not worried about anti-DEI pushback.
