= Hailey Bieber =

American model and businesswoman (born 1996)

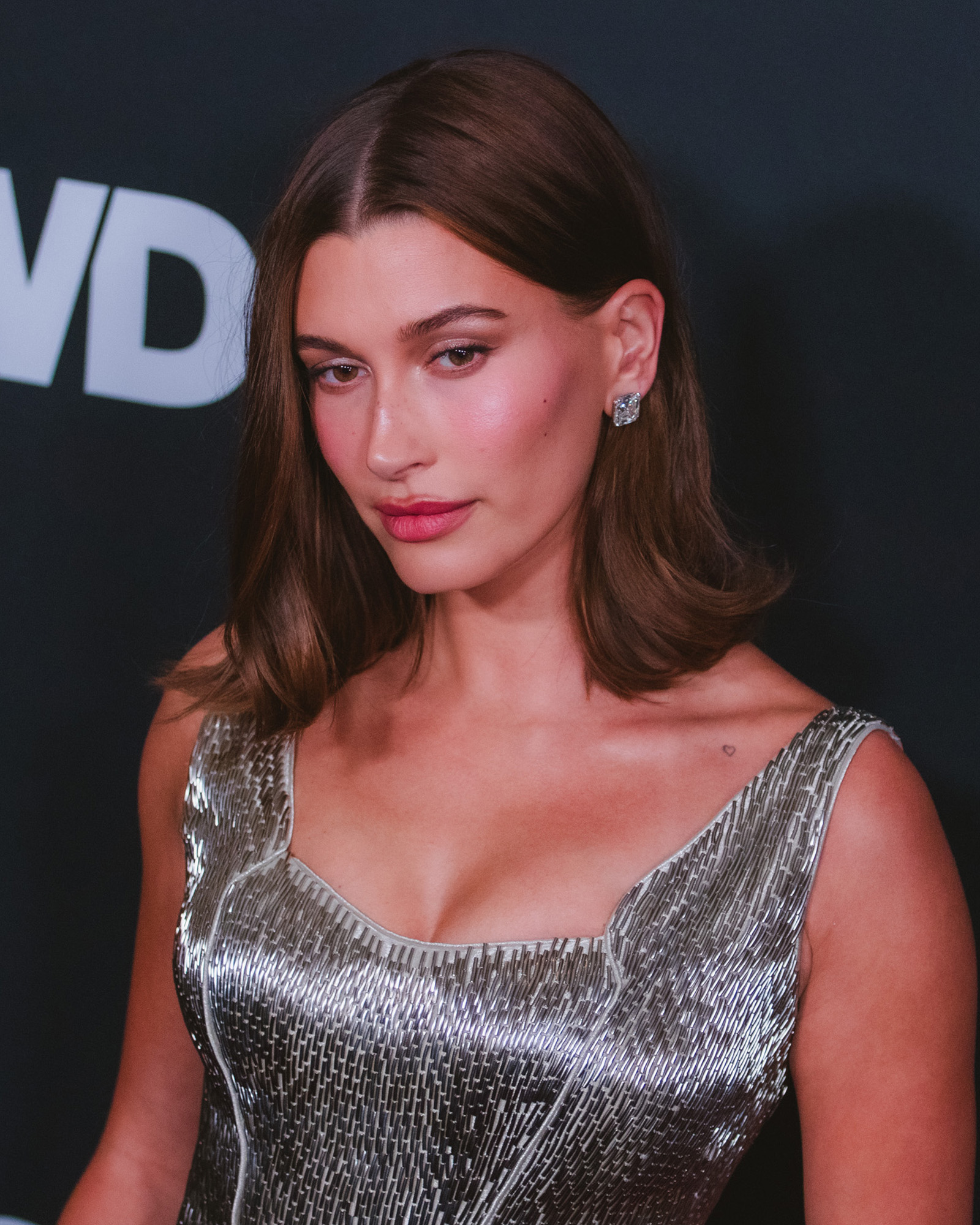
- Bieber in 2026
- Born: Hailey Rhode Baldwin; November 22, 1996 (age 29); Tucson, Arizona, U.S.
- Occupations: Model; socialite; media personality; businesswoman
- Years active: 2014–present
- Spouse: Justin Bieber (m. 2018)
- Children: 1
- Father: Stephen Baldwin
- Relatives: Eumir Deodato (maternal grandfather); Alec Baldwin (paternal uncle); Pattie Mallette (mother-in-law); Ireland Baldwin (cousin)
- Family: Baldwin
- Modeling information
- Height: 5 ft 8 in (1.73 m)
- Hair color: Light brown
- Eye color: Brown
- Agency: IMG Models

Hailey Rhode Bieber (née Baldwin; born November 22, 1996) is an American model, socialite, media personality, and businesswoman. She is the founder and chief creative officer (CCO) of the skincare brand Rhode, which was acquired by e.l.f. in a $1 billion deal. As a model, Bieber featured in campaigns for Guess, Ralph Lauren, and Tommy Hilfiger. In 2023, she was selected for the Forbes 30 under 30 list in the Art & Style category.

== Early life and family ==
Bieber was born in Tucson, Arizona, on November 22, 1996. Her mother is Kennya Deodato, a Brazilian graphic designer also of Italian descent, while her father is actor Stephen Baldwin, the youngest of the Baldwin brothers. Bieber's maternal grandfather is the Brazilian musician Eumir Deodato. She was named after Halley's Comet.

== Career ==
=== Modeling ===
The first modeling agency Bieber signed with was Ford Models, appearing in magazines such as Tatler, LOVE, V and i-D. Her first commercial campaign was for the clothing brand French Connection in the winter of 2014. In October 2014, Bieber made her runway debut walking for Topshop and French fashion designer Sonia Rykiel. In December 2014, she was involved in a photo session for Love magazine, which also produced a short movie shot by photographer Daniel Jackson and released on the magazine's official YouTube channel.

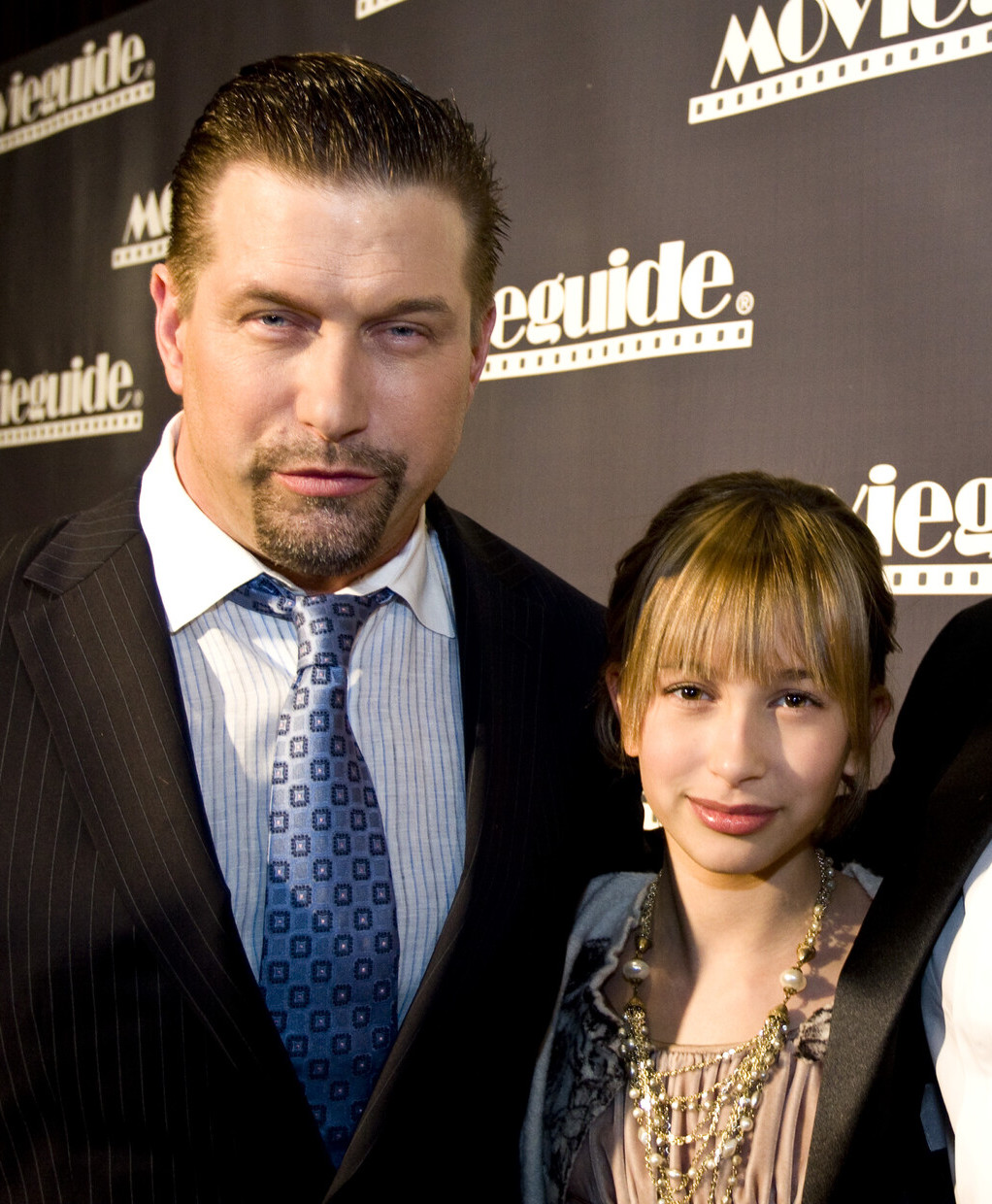
Bieber, age 12, with her father at the 2009 Movieguide Awards

In January 2015, Bieber was photographed for American Vogue and in March for Teen Vogue. In April, she shot her first magazine cover for Jalouse magazine alongside male model Lucky Blue Smith. In the same month she was involved in two further cover-shoots, for the Dutch edition of L'Officiel and the American edition of Wonderland magazine and was also pictured in editorials for Miss Vogue and W magazines. In July 2015, she was featured in Ralph Lauren advertising alongside Australian singer Cody Simpson, and in October returned to the runway for Tommy Hilfiger and Philipp Plein.

In January 2016, Bieber appeared in a Ralph Lauren campaign and shot an editorial for the Korean edition of Vogue. After walking again for Tommy Hilfiger in February, Bieber featured in spring/summer campaigns for Philipp Plein and Tommy Hilfiger. In the same period she was also shot for Self magazine and filmed for a commercial of clothing brand H&M, which was released in the Coachella Music Festival period in April. In March 2016, Bieber signed a contract with high-profile New York modeling agency IMG Models and in May appeared on the cover of Marie Claire, who described her as a "fresh face". The American cover was also released as the July cover of the Dutch edition of Marie Claire. In June, Bieber walked for Moschino alongside high-profile supermodels such as Miranda Kerr, Alessandra Ambrosio, Jourdan Dunn and Chanel Iman and in the same month she also made her debut in advertising for Guess.

During the summer of 2016, Bieber was photographed and filmed for an UGG footwear campaign, alongside supermodel Rosie Huntington-Whiteley. Along with Joan Smalls, Bieber was also the face of Karl Lagerfeld's limited-edition North American clothing line entitled "Love from Paris". Bieber also appeared in editorials for Glamour Magazine and Italian Vogue. In September, she took part in New York Fashion Week, walking for Tommy Hilfiger, Prabal Gurung, Jeremy Scott, Tory Burch and Matty Bovan. In London she made a personal appearance at a pre-London Fashion Week party at Stradivarius where she provided social media presence via selfies and tweets. She then walked for Julien Macdonald in LFW. During Milan Fashion Week Bieber walked for Dolce & Gabbana and in Paris Fashion Week she walked for Elie Saab. Bieber also appeared in advertising for Prabal Gurung Sport. Later that year she featured in campaigns for Guess' holiday collection and Australian label Sass & Bide. In November 2016, Bieber was on the cover of the Australian edition of Harper's Bazaar, and featured in a French Elle editorial.

In 2017, Bieber was featured on the cover of Spanish Harper's Bazaar alongside male model Jon Kortajarena and the British edition of Elle. Bieber also appeared in the promotion video for the Fyre Festival. She has since then stated that the money went towards charity. Bieber appeared in the March 2018 issue of US Elle. In September 2018, Bieber became a face of the Power of Good campaign for the Shiseido-owned make-up brand bareMinerals.

Bieber became the face of Levi Jeans in 2019.

=== Business and creative direction ===
On June 15, 2022, Bieber launched a skincare brand called Rhode, after her middle name. In the fiscal year ended March 31, 2025, Rhode achieved $212 million in total sales.

On May 28, 2025, e.l.f. cosmetics announced its acquisition of Rhode for $1 billion. The deal consists of a $600 million cash payment, $200 million in shares of e.l.f. stock to Rhode's existing equity holders, and a $200 million earn out that would be payable over three years based on hitting performance goals. Bieber will remain with Rhode as its chief creative officer and head of innovation, overseeing creative, product innovation, and marketing. She will also act as a strategic beauty advisor to both companies. The deal is expected to close later in 2025 subject to regulatory and shareholder approval.

=== Other ventures ===
==== Acting and TV appearances ====
In 2005, then aged nine, Bieber appeared alongside her family in the television documentary Livin It: Unusual Suspects, and in 2009, she made an appearance in an episode of the TV show Saturday Night Live by the side of her uncle Alec Baldwin. In 2011, she appeared as Australian singer Cody Simpson's love interest in the music video of the song "On My Mind" as part of her early work and several years later, in 2016, she had a role in a second music video, "Love to Love You Baby" by French model and singer Baptiste Giabiconi, a cover of the Donna Summer song released in 1975.

==== Hosting ====
On October 25, 2015, Bieber worked as a TV host in a segment of the 2015 MTV Europe Music Awards in Milan, Italy. Alongside Italian supermodel Bianca Balti and English rapper Tinie Tempah she revealed the winners of the Best Music Video Award, were Macklemore and Ryan Lewis for the video of their song "Downtown". On June 19, 2016, she co-hosted with model Gigi Hadid announcing a live exhibition by Shawn Mendes at the 2016 iHeartRadio Much Music Video Awards in Toronto, Canada.

Beginning on May 2, 2017, Bieber began hosting a new TBS show Drop the Mic with rapper Method Man, featuring four celebrities facing off in a series of rap battles. As of 2020, the show had been broadcast for two seasons but had yet to be renewed or cancelled for season three.

==== Personal branding ====
In 2016, Bieber collaborated with clothing brand The Daily Edited, promoting a handbag capsule collection labeled as #theHAILEYedited collection. In the same year, she announced a collaboration with UK footwear brand Public Desire using the hashtag #PDxHB, and announced she would be launching her own make-up collection produced by Australian brand ModelCo. In 2018, Bieber applied for and received a trademark on her name "Hailey Bieber" for commercial purposes.

== Personal life ==
Bieber enjoyed being a classical ballet dancer even though she did not see it as a career. She trained for 12 years and fought through multiple injuries. Bieber stopped ballet when she was discovered at 16 and became a model. In addition to English, Bieber speaks some Portuguese as the maternal side of her family is Brazilian.

Hailey and Justin Bieber entered a month-long relationship in December 2015 before splitting up in January 2016, and later reconciled in June 2018. The couple got engaged in July 2018, and confirmed in November 2018 that they were married. The Biebers held a second wedding ceremony in South Carolina on September 30, 2019. On May 9, 2024, it was announced that Hailey was pregnant with the couple's first child. They announced the birth of their son on August 23, 2024. As of 2024, Bieber primarily resides with her husband in La Quinta, California, having previously lived in their lakefront property in Cambridge, Ontario, in Canada.

Bieber was raised as an evangelical Christian and attends Churchome, the same nondenominational church attended by her husband.

On World Mental Health Day 2020, she endorsed Joe Biden for the United States presidential election. She had initially endorsed Senator Bernie Sanders for the Democratic nomination during the party's primaries in 2020. Bieber supports abortion rights, describing the overturning of Roe v. Wade as 'an extreme loss and disappointment. This is really really scary.' In May 2022, Bieber appeared alongside almost 160 other celebrities in a "Bans Off Our Bodies" full-page advertisement in the New York Times advocating for reproductive rights.

In October 2026, on the eve of the 2026 Brazilian presidential election runoff, Bieber endorsed the incumbent President Luiz Inácio Lula da Silva's reelection bid.

=== Health ===
Bieber was hospitalized with stroke-like symptoms on March 10, 2022, and was discharged the following day. In a 12-minute video she posted on her YouTube channel, she revealed she had suffered from a transient ischemic attack, caused by a patent foramen ovale and had surgery to repair the heart defect. Bieber stated that she had an ovarian cyst "the size of an apple" on her ovary and she had had such cysts "a few times" in November 2022. In November 2026, Bieber spoke experiencing suicidal ideation and depression after receiving online hate comments amidst a rumored feud with Selena Gomez.

== Filmography ==
=== Television ===
Year	Title	Role	Notes
2005	Livin It: Unusual Suspects	Herself	Documentary movie
2009	Saturday Night Live	Herself	Episode: "Alec Baldwin/Jonas Brothers"
2015	Secrets of New York Fashion Week	Herself	Documentary movie
2017–2019	Drop the Mic	Herself (co-host)	Musical Reality Competition TV Series
2018	2018 iHeartRadio Music Awards	Herself (co-host)	Special
2018	The American Meme	Herself	Documentary Film
2021	Dave	Herself	TV series, cameo
2023	A Very Demi Holiday Special	Herself	Television special

=== Music videos ===
Year	Title	Artist	Role	Ref.
2011	"On My Mind"	Cody Simpson	Love interest	
2016	"Love to Love You Baby"	Baptiste Giabiconi	Girl	
2019	"10,000 Hours"	Dan + Shay and Justin Bieber	Herself	
2020	"Stuck with U"	Ariana Grande and Justin Bieber	Herself	
2020	"PopStar"	DJ Khaled, Drake	Herself	
2025	"Yukon"	Justin Bieber		

== Awards and nominations ==
Year	Award	Category	Result	Ref
2016	Teen Choice Awards	Female Hottie of the Year	Nominated	
2016	Teen Choice Awards	Model of the Year	Nominated	
2017	Teen Choice Awards	Model of the Year	Nominated	
2018	Teen Choice Awards	TV Personality of the Year	Nominated	
2018	Teen Choice Awards	Female Hottie of the Year	Nominated	
2022	Streamy Awards	Best Crossover	Nominated	
2022	Beauty Inc Awards	Newcomer of the Year	Won	
2023	Streamy Awards	Best Crossover	Nominated	
2025	Daily Front Row	Beauty Innovator of the Year	Won	
2025	WSJ Innovator Beauty Awards	Beauty Innovator of the Year	Won	
