= Grey (disambiguation) =

Grey or gray is a neutral color between black and white.

Grey, greys, gray, or grays may also refer to:

== Arts, entertainment and media ==
=== Music ===
- Gray (band), an American experimental band
- Grey (duo), an American electronic music duo
- Grey (album), by Sandy Lam, 1987
- "Grey", by the 69 Eyes from Paris Kills, 2002
- "Grey", by Ani DiFranco from Revelling/Reckoning, 2001
- "Grey", by BarlowGirl from Another Journal Entry, 2005
- "Gray", by Demi Lovato from Dancing with the Devil... the Art of Starting Over, 2021
- "Grey", by Fireflight from Glam-rök, 2002
- "Grey", by Funeral for a Friend from Conduit, 2013
- "Grey", by LeToya Luckett from Back 2 Life, 2017
- "Grey", by Nasum from Inhale/Exhale, 1998
- "Grey", by Neurosis from Pain of Mind, 1987
- "Grey", by New Young Pony Club from Fantastic Playroom, 2007
- "Grey", by Paradise Lost from Paradise Lost, 2005
- "Grey", by Spineshank from Strictly Diesel, 1998
- "Grey", by Strife from In This Defiance, 1997
- "Grey", by Travis Scott from Days Before Rodeo, 2014
- "Grey", by Why Don't We from The Good Times and the Bad Ones, 2021
- "Grey", by Yellowcard from Lights and Sounds, 2006

=== Other uses in arts, entertainment, and media ===
- Grey (manga), a Japanese science fiction manga
- Grey: Fifty Shades of Grey as Told by Christian, a 2015 book by E.L. James
- The Grey (film), a 2011 thriller film

== Businesses and organizations ==
=== Businesses ===
- Grey (company), formerly Aboki Africa, an American financial technology company
- Grey Global Group, a global advertising and marketing agency
- Gray Light Car, a 1920 cyclecar
- Gray Marine Motor Company, a defunct American manufacturer
  - Gray (automobile) (1922–1926)
- Gray Media, an American TV broadcasting company
- Grays International, an English sports equipment manufacturing company

=== Education ===
- Gray Academy of Jewish Education, Winnipeg, Manitoba
- Grey College (disambiguation), several colleges
- Grey High School (disambiguation), several colleges
- Grey School of Wizardry, an online educational institution in secular esoteric arts

== Military ==
- Grey Regiment, an infantry regiment of the Canadian Militia
- Royal Scots Greys, a Scottish cavalry regiment
- The Grays, the Confederate States of America's armed forces
- USS Gray, a United States Navy frigate 1970–1991
- USS John P. Gray, a United States Navy high-speed transport 1944–1946

== People ==
- Gray (given name), including a list of people and fictional characters with the name
  - Gray (singer) (born 1986), a South Korean hip hop recording artist and record producer
- Grey (given name), including a list of people and fictional characters with the name
- Gray (surname), including a list of people and fictional characters with the name
- Grey (surname), including a list of people and fictional characters with the name

== Places ==
=== Antarctica ===
- Cape Gray
- Grey Island (South Orkney Islands)

=== Australia ===
- Gray, Northern Territory
- Gray, Tasmania
- Grey County, Queensland
- Grey County, Western Australia
- County of Grey, South Australia
- Division of Grey, electoral district in South Australia
- Grey Island (Western Australia)
- Grey River (Victoria)

=== Canada ===
- Gray, Saskatchewan
- Grays Bay, Nunavut
- Grey County, Ontario
- Grey River, Newfoundland and Labrador
- Grey Islands, Newfoundland
- Rural Municipality of Grey, Manitoba

=== New Zealand ===
- Grey County, New Zealand (1876–1989)
- Grey District
- Gray River
- Grey River (New Zealand)
- Grey (New Zealand electorate)

=== United Kingdom ===
- Grays, Essex
- Grays, Kent

=== United States ===
- Gray, Georgia
- Gray, Iowa
- Gray, Kentucky
- Gray, Louisiana
- Gray, Maine, a New England town
  - Gray (CDP), Maine, the main village in the town
- Gray, Blair County, Pennsylvania
- Gray, Somerset County, Pennsylvania
- Gray, Tennessee
- Grays, Washington
- Gray County, Kansas
- Gray County, Texas
- Gray Army Airfield in Tacoma, Washington
- Greys River, in Wyoming

=== Elsewhere ===
- Gray, Haute-Saône, France
- Grey Town, Río San Juan Department, Nicaragua
- Cape Gray, Greenland
- Grey Pond, Anguilla
- Grey River (Chile)

== Sport ==
- Grey Cup, awarded in the Canadian Football League
- Homestead Grays, a baseball team in the Negro leagues in the United States
- Louisville Grays, a 19th-century United States baseball team
- Providence Grays, a Major League Baseball team that folded in 1885
  - Providence Grays (minor league), the name of several minor league baseball teams between 1886 and 1949

== Science and technology ==
- Gray (unit), the SI unit of ionizing radiation dose
- Gray code, an encoding method used to minimise bit change between adjacent values

== Other uses ==
- Grey alien, or grey, a purported extraterrestrial being
- Gray horse, a horse with a depigmented coat

== See also ==
- The Grey (disambiguation)
- Gray Mountain (disambiguation)
- Gray Peak (disambiguation)
- Gray's Anatomy (disambiguation)
- Justice Gray (disambiguation)
- Gray-box testing, a step in software development
