= Grey Island =

Grey Island may refer to:

- Grey Island (South Orkney Islands) 60°45′S 45°2′W
- Grey Island (Western Australia) 15°03′38″S 124°57′11″E
