= The Voice of Greece season 8 =

The Voice of Greece
- Season 8
- Hosted by: Giorgos Lianos; Valia Hatzitheodorou (backstage in all rounds except Blind Auditions)
- Coaches: Helena Paparizou; Sakis Rouvas; Panos Mouzourakis; Konstantinos Argyros
- Winner: Anna Argyrou
- Winning coach: Sakis Rouvas
- Runner-up: Andreas Miliotis

Release
- Original network: Skai TV; Sigma TV
- Original release: September 18 – December 19, 2021

Season chronology
- ← Previous; Season 7

The eighth season of the talent show The Voice of Greece premiered on September 18, 2021 on Skai TV and Sigma TV. Giorgos Lianos is the host for the third time, while the three coaches from the previous five seasons, Helena Paparizou, Sakis Rouvas and Panos Mouzourakis return, welcoming Konstantinos Argyros as the new coach, replacing Eleonora Zouganeli. Valia Hatzitheodorou was the backstage host for all the rounds, except the Blind Auditions, replacing Laura Narjes.

== Teams ==
Color key

Winner
Runner-up
Third place
Fourth place
Eliminated in the Live Shows
Stolen in the Battles
Eliminated in the Battles
Stolen in the Knockouts
Eliminated in the Knockouts

Coaches' teams
Coach	Top artists				
Panos Mouzourakis					
Panos Mouzourakis	Natalia Osaouarou	Manos & Alexandra	Leonidas Vasilakopoulos	Giorgos Anastasopoulos	
Helena Paparizou					
Helena Paparizou	Fani Melemeni	Eleytheria Agapaki	Elisavet Athanasiadou	Eleni Olybiou	
Sakis Rouvas					
Sakis Rouvas	Aria Kavalari	Andreas Tsakos	Andreas Miliotis	Irini Stillo	Anna Argyrou
Konstantinos Argyros					
Konstantinos Argyros	Nikos Volikas	Stavros Aktinis	Panos Psaltis	Manolis Kapsalakis	
Note: Italicized names are stolen artists (names struck through within former teams).

== Blind auditions ==
The blind auditions begin airing on September 18, 2021, being broadcast every Saturday and Sunday on Skai TV and Sigma TV.

Color key
✔	Coach pressed "ΣΕ ΘΕΛΩ (I want you)" button
	Artist defaulted to a coach's team
	Artist elected a coach's team
	Artist was eliminated with no coach pressing their "ΣΕ ΘΕΛΩ" button
✘	Coach pressed the "ΣΕ ΘΕΛΩ" button, but was blocked by Panos from getting the artist
✘	Coach pressed the "ΣΕ ΘΕΛΩ" button, but was blocked by Helena from getting the artist
✘	Coach pressed the "ΣΕ ΘΕΛΩ" button, but was blocked by Sakis from getting the artist
✘	Coach pressed the "ΣΕ ΘΕΛΩ" button, but was blocked by Konstantinos from getting the artist

Blind auditions results
Episode	Order	Artist	Age	Song	Coach's and contestant's choices			
Episode	Order	Artist	Age	Song	Panos	Helena	Sakis	Konstantinos
Episode 1 (September 18, 2021)	1	Nikos Volikas	23	"Mazi sou"	✔	✔	✔	✔
Episode 1 (September 18, 2021)	2	Aria Kavalari	19	"Dancing with the Devil"	–	–	✔	✔
Episode 1 (September 18, 2021)	3	Dionisis Apostolopoulos	38	"Na loipon giati s' agapisa"	–	–	–	–
Episode 1 (September 18, 2021)	4	Natalia Osawarou	16	"Hallelujah"	✔	–	✔	✔
Episode 1 (September 18, 2021)	5	Andreas Tsakos	31	"Lathos"	–	–	✔	✔
Episode 1 (September 18, 2021)	6	Fani Melemeni	19	"Levitating"	✔	✔	✔	✔
Episode 1 (September 18, 2021)	7	Stavros Aktinis	20	"Kapou nichtonei"	–	–	✔	✔
Episode 1 (September 18, 2021)	8	Panos Linos	62	"Panta gelastoi"	–	–	–	–
Episode 1 (September 18, 2021)	9	Manos Thrasivoulou & Alexandra Tantou	25 & 20	"Poso mou leipeis"	✔	✔	✔	✔
Episode 1 (September 18, 2021)	10	Andreas Miliotis	28	"Purple Rain"	✔	✘	✔	✔
Episode 1 (September 18, 2021)	11	Chrisa Peppa	28	"Ola odigoun se sena"	–	–	–	–
Episode 1 (September 18, 2021)	12	Eleftheria Agapaki	26	"Beggin'"	✔	✔	✔	✔
Episode 2 (September 19, 2021)	1	Eirini Stillo	22	"Soulmate"	✔	–	✔	✔
Episode 2 (September 19, 2021)	2	Eleni Ximini	28	"Sti diskotek"	–	–	–	–
Episode 2 (September 19, 2021)	3	Leonidas Vasilakopoulos	29	"Opou kai na pao"	✔	–	–	–
Episode 2 (September 19, 2021)	4	Elisavet Athanasiadou	29	"Just Walk Away"	✔	✔	✔	✔
Episode 2 (September 19, 2021)	5	Panos Psaltis	45	"Apopse tha' thela"	✔	–	✔	✔
Episode 2 (September 19, 2021)	6	Markos Nomikos	22	"Talking to the Moon"	–	–	–	–
Episode 2 (September 19, 2021)	7	Giorgos Anastasopoulos	24	"To salami (To asteio)"	✔	–	✔	–
Episode 2 (September 19, 2021)	8	Elpida Tsivioglou	29	"Holding Out for a Hero"	–	–	–	–
Episode 2 (September 19, 2021)	9	Manolis Kapsalakis	34	"Dio psemata"	–	✔	✔	✔
Episode 2 (September 19, 2021)	10	Eleni Olympiou	21	"Runnin' (Lose It All)"	✔	✔	✔	✔
Episode 2 (September 19, 2021)	11	Anna Argyrou	16	"Stone Cold"	✔	✔	✔	✘
Episode 3 (September 25, 2021)	1	Danai Kalogianni	26	"Stereotipa"	✔	✔	–	✔
Episode 3 (September 25, 2021)	2	Konna	23	"Butter"	✔	–	✔	–
Episode 3 (September 25, 2021)	3	Stella Rebelou	24	"Perasmenes mou agapes"	–	–	–	–
Episode 3 (September 25, 2021)	4	Giorgos Pattas	22	"Writing's on the Wall"	✔	✔	✔	✔
Episode 3 (September 25, 2021)	5	Alexandra Mercedes	29	"All of Me"	–	–	–	–
Episode 3 (September 25, 2021)	6	Sotiris Gerabinis	29	"To mantili"	–	✔	✔	✔
Episode 3 (September 25, 2021)	7	Alex Laertis	28	"Black"	✔	✔	–	✔
Episode 3 (September 25, 2021)	8	Evgenia Vazoura	24	"Pote voudas pote koudas"	–	✔	–	✔
Episode 3 (September 25, 2021)	9	Stefania Gatsakou	27	"The Hills"	✔	✔	✔	✔
Episode 3 (September 25, 2021)	10	Markella Diamanti	20	"Elastic Heart"	✔	–	✔	–
Episode 3 (September 25, 2021)	11	Dimitris Kiassos	49	"'O sole mio"	–	–	–	–
Episode 3 (September 25, 2021)	12	Christina Zeniou	25	"drivers license"	✔	✔	✔	✔
Episode 4 (September 26, 2021)	1	Elena Ergati	26	"Paidia ton dromon"	✔	–	✔	–
Episode 4 (September 26, 2021)	2	Giorgos Giagidis	20	"Eï kapetanie"	–	✔	✔	✔
Episode 4 (September 26, 2021)	3	Sofia Isakidou	23	"Vals gia ena fili"	–	–	–	–
Episode 4 (September 26, 2021)	4	Apostolis Karalis	29	"Rock 'n' Roll sto krevati"	✔	–	–	–
Episode 4 (September 26, 2021)	5	Filippos Machairas	31	"O palios stratiotis"	✔	✔	✔	✔
Episode 4 (September 26, 2021)	6	Anastasia Makrinioti	26	"Ragisa"	–	–	–	–
Episode 4 (September 26, 2021)	7	Konstantinos Gremoutis	37	"San anemos"	–	✔	–	–
Episode 4 (September 26, 2021)	8	Konstantina Soulioti	23	"Petao"	–	✔	✔	✔
Episode 4 (September 26, 2021)	9	Eirini Sotiri	22	"Paradothika se sena"	–	–	–	–
Episode 4 (September 26, 2021)	10	Marios Psarianos	30	"The Blower's Daughter"	✔	✔	✔	✔
Episode 4 (September 26, 2021)	11	Vaggelis Moles	20	"Den echo chrono"	–	–	✔	–
Episode 4 (September 26, 2021)	12	Melissa Williams	49	"Strong Enough"	✔	✔	✔	✔
Episode 4 (September 26, 2021)	13	Paul Williams	24	"Hopelessly Devoted to You"	✔	–	–	–
Episode 4 (September 26, 2021)	14	Dimitris Karikis	21	"S' agapao"	–	–	–	–
Episode 4 (September 26, 2021)	15	Maria Theodorou	26	"Stop!"	✔	✔	✔	✔
Episode 5 (October 2, 2021)	1	Giannis Gerontas	38	"Astin na leei"	–	✔	✔	✔
Episode 5 (October 2, 2021)	2	Dimitris Melidis	43	"Etsi ki allios"	✔	–	–	–
Episode 5 (October 2, 2021)	3	Sindi Tane	27	"Jolene"	–	–	–	–
Episode 5 (October 2, 2021)	4	Eleftheria Tsagiri	23	"Se poia thalassa armenizeis"	–	✔	✔	–
Episode 5 (October 2, 2021)	5	Katerina Kostopoulou	22	"I Love Rock 'n' Roll"	–	–	–	–
Episode 5 (October 2, 2021)	6	Nutsa Khurtsidze	19	"Bohemian Rhapsody"	✘	✔	✔	✔
Episode 5 (October 2, 2021)	7	Charis Loufopoulos	35	"Malamatenia logia"	–	–	–	–
Episode 5 (October 2, 2021)	8	Andrea Filippou	20	"What About Us"	✔	–	–	–
Episode 5 (October 2, 2021)	9	Andreas Drakopoulos	35	"Pou na 'sai"	✔	✔	✔	✔
Episode 5 (October 2, 2021)	10	Spiros Pantazopoulos	43	"Fevgo gia mena"	–	✔	–	–
Episode 5 (October 2, 2021)	11	Nikos Aronis	29	"Electric Worry"	✔	✔	✔	✔
Episode 5 (October 2, 2021)	12	Aggeliki Kasidokosta	20	"Kouventa stin kouventa"	–	–	–	–
Episode 5 (October 2, 2021)	13	Zoi Giannouli	16	"Dangerous Woman"	✔	–	–	✔
Episode 5 (October 2, 2021)	14	Giorgos Glikokokalos	29	"Ta logia kai ta chronia"	✔	✔	✔	✔
Episode 6 (October 3, 2021)	1	Giannis Karkos	31	"I nichta mirizei giasemi"	–	–	✔	✔
Episode 6 (October 3, 2021)	2	Eleni Leontaki	27	"Ama charazei sto Aigaio"	–	–	–	–
Episode 6 (October 3, 2021)	3	Evgenia Karatzovali	18	"Genie in a Bottle"	–	✔	✔	✔
Episode 6 (October 3, 2021)	4	Giannis Zachos	23	"The Kill (Bury Me)"	✔	–	–	–
Episode 6 (October 3, 2021)	5	Christina Barzouka	19	"I Dreamed a Dream"	✔	✔	✔	✔
Episode 6 (October 3, 2021)	6	Kleio Vlachouli	21	"Ela psichoula mou"	✔	–	–	–
Episode 6 (October 3, 2021)	7	Panos Malakos	34	"Pote tha se do"	–	–	–	–
Episode 6 (October 3, 2021)	8	Christos Siogas	25	"Colors"	–	✔	✔	✔
Episode 6 (October 3, 2021)	9	Konstantinos Salpadimos	24	"To s' agapo"	–	–	–	–
Episode 6 (October 3, 2021)	10	Christina Bagdasaridou	18	"Black Dog"	✔	✔	✔	✔
Episode 6 (October 3, 2021)	11	Sofia Papoulakou	37	"Sinavlia"	–	✔	✔	–
Episode 6 (October 3, 2021)	12	Giorgos Siderakis	33	"To 'pes"	–	–	–	–
Episode 6 (October 3, 2021)	13	Iliana Alexandrou	20	"No Time to Die"	✔	✘	✔	✔
Episode 7 (October 9, 2021)	1	Lena Kirolivanou	31	"Elenitsa"	–	✔	✔	✔
Episode 7 (October 9, 2021)	2	Giorgos Vasileiou	25	"Misi kardia"	–	–	–	–
Episode 7 (October 9, 2021)	3	Dimmy Rizou	23	"Toxic"	✔	–	✔	✔
Episode 7 (October 9, 2021)	4	Evgenia Karibidou	19	"To kokkino potami"	–	–	–	–
Episode 7 (October 9, 2021)	5	Theonimfi Christaki	23	"Anyone"	✔	✔	✔	–
Episode 7 (October 9, 2021)	6	Vasilis Konstantinou	27	"I monaxia mes' ap' ta matia mou"	–	–	–	–
Episode 7 (October 9, 2021)	7	Viki Kapsali	31	"Layla"	✔	–	–	–
Episode 7 (October 9, 2021)	8	Silouani Nevrokopli	20	"Friends"	✔	–	–	✔
Episode 7 (October 9, 2021)	9	Ioanna Kirmizi	16	"Pote na mi chatheis ap' ti zoi mou"	–	–	–	–
Episode 7 (October 9, 2021)	10	Natasa Christofi	33	"One Way or Another"	✔	–	✔	✔
Episode 7 (October 9, 2021)	11	Katerina Vasilopoulou	16	"Unstoppable"	–	–	–	–
Episode 7 (October 9, 2021)	12	Thodoris Manolikas	37	"Pou 'nai ta chronia"	✔	–	–	–
Episode 7 (October 9, 2021)	13	Spiros Drougas	25	"Paraskevi proi"	–	–	✔	✔
Episode 7 (October 9, 2021)	14	Eleni Tetepoulidou	31	"Den xero poso s' agapo"	–	–	–	–
Episode 7 (October 9, 2021)	15	Kiki Tsaliki	28	"Never Enough"	✔	✔	✔	✔
Episode 8 (October 10, 2021)	1	Aggelos Baltagiannis	23	"Akoma mia zoi"	✔	–	✔	–
Episode 8 (October 10, 2021)	2	Alexandros Polichronidis	57	"Avgerinos"	–	–	–	–
Episode 8 (October 10, 2021)	3	Konstantina-Manto Sanni	31	"Ego s' agapisa edo"	✔	–	✔	–
Episode 8 (October 10, 2021)	4	Evi Koulkouvini	20	"Na 'tan i chara oikopedo (Borino oro)"	✔	–	✔	✔
Episode 8 (October 10, 2021)	5	Ana Canaza Vega	21	"Can't Take My Eyes Off You"	–	–	–	–
Episode 8 (October 10, 2021)	6	Giorgos Antonopoulos	36	"bad guy"	✔	–	–	–
Episode 8 (October 10, 2021)	7	Christos Simeonidis	25	"Patrida m' araevo se"	–	✔	–	✔
Episode 8 (October 10, 2021)	8	Aggeliki Vasileiadi & Iason Karvounis	18 & 19	"Summer Wine"	–	–	–	–
Episode 8 (October 10, 2021)	9	Fereniki Valari	22	"Back to Black"	✔	–	–	✔
Episode 8 (October 10, 2021)	10	Petros Laertis	35	"Min argeis"	–	–	–	–
Episode 8 (October 10, 2021)	11	Marios Theodorou	22	"Ta kalokairia"	✔	✔	✔	✔
Episode 8 (October 10, 2021)	12	Foteini Mastrosifaki-Chatira	29	"Ta mavra koroïdeveis"	–	–	–	✔
Episode 8 (October 10, 2021)	13	Nektaria Zabeli	23	"You Lost Me"	✔	✔	✔	✔

== Ratings ==
Episode		Date	Timeslot (EET)	Ratings	Viewers (in millions)	Rank		Share		Source
Episode		Date	Timeslot (EET)	Ratings	Viewers (in millions)	Daily	Weekly	Household	Adults 18-54	Source
1	"Blind Auditions"	September 18, 2021	Saturday 9:00pm	9.7%	1.004	#1	#9	31.6%	26.8%	
2	"Blind Auditions"	September 19, 2021	Sunday 9:00pm	9.8%	1.016	#2	#7	25.5%	22.9%	
3	"Blind Auditions"	September 25, 2021	Saturday 9:00pm	TBD	TBD	TBD	TBD	22.5%	17.8%	
4	"Blind Auditions"	September 26, 2021	Sunday 9:00pm	TBD	TBD	TBD	TBD	TBD	TBD	
