= Gray Mountain =

Gray Mountain or variants may refer to:

== Settlements ==
- Gray Mountain, Arizona, US

== Mountains ==
- Gray Mountain, Whitehorse, Yukon, Canada
- Gray Mountain (Kentucky), US, location of John Shell Cabin
- Gray Mountain, Peloncillo Mountains, New Mexico

== Arts and entertainment ==
- Gray Mountain (Grisham novel), 2014
- Grey Mountains in J. R. R. Tolkien's Middle-earth fiction Ered Mithrin
- Grey Mountains in the fictional Warhammer Fantasy (setting) by Games Workshop
- The Grey Mountains, a 1992 supplement for Middle-earth Role Playing

== See also ==
- Gray Peak (disambiguation)
- Gray Nunatak, Antarctica
- Gray Summit, Missouri, US
