= Met Him Last Night =

2021 single by Demi Lovato

Single by Demi Lovato featuring Ariana Grande

from the album Dancing with the Devil... the Art of Starting Over
- Released: April 13, 2021
- Recorded: 2021
- Studio: Westlake Recording Studios (Hollywood, California); Facet House (West Hollywood, California)
- Genre: Electro; R&B
- Length: 3:24
- Label: Island; Republic
- Songwriters: Ariana Grande; Albert Stanaj; Tommy Brown; Courageous Xavier Herrera
- Producers: Tommy Brown; Xavi

Demi Lovato singles chronology
"Dancing with the Devil" (2021)	"Met Him Last Night" (2021)	"Breakdown" (2021)

Ariana Grande singles chronology
"POV" (2021)	"Met Him Last Night" (2021)	"Save Your Tears" (remix) (2021)

Lyric video
- "Met Him Last Night" on YouTube

"Met Him Last Night" is a song by American singer Demi Lovato featuring American singer-songwriter Ariana Grande. The song was originally released on April 2, 2021, as the ninth track on Lovato's seventh studio album Dancing with the Devil... the Art of Starting Over. It was later serviced to US contemporary hit radio by Island Records on April 13, 2021, as the album's fourth and final single. "Met Him Last Night" was written by Grande alongside Albert Stanaj, Tommy Brown, and Courageous Xavier "Xavi" Herrera, and was produced by Brown and Xavi, with vocal production by Mitch Allan. Commercially, the song reached the top 40 in Hungary, Ireland, Norway, and on the Billboard Global 200. At the 64th Annual Grammy Awards, the Dave Audé remix of the song was nominated for Best Remixed Recording.

== Background ==
After Demi Lovato played Ariana Grande some songs from her then-forthcoming album in 2019, the latter began to write "Met Him Last Night" specifically with Lovato's story in mind; the former said: "She knew about the story behind it and everything, and she's a close friend of mine, so she knew my story pretty well". Originally, Grande did not want to appear on the song herself, with Lovato later convincing her: "I was like 'I feel like the world would love to hear us together, like we should do that'". She expressed her excitement about working with Grande in an interview with People.

At the end of March 2021, Lovato revealed the featured artists for her seventh studio album, Dancing with the Devil... the Art of Starting Over, by posting snippets of the collaborations on her social media accounts, including the song with Grande. In an interview with Paper Magazine, she confirmed the title of the track, "Met Him Last Night". The singer also stated that it was a late addition to the album, having been recorded in the three weeks prior to its release.

Lovato stated the song is "best representative" of a period in her life discussed in the documentary series Demi Lovato: Dancing with the Devil, which involves "the downfalls of recovery" and that "sometimes you slip up", presumably referencing a slip-up had after a "week-long intensive trauma retreat" due to calling up her drug dealer in hopes of trying to "rewrite his choice of violating me". The song is a follow-up to Lovato's prior single "Dancing with the Devil", as "Met Him Last Night" features the "Devil" as the seductive title character and antagonist that Lovato and Grande sing about meeting up with.

== Release ==
Following the release of Dancing with the Devil... the Art of Starting Over, "Met Him Last Night" was sent to contemporary hit radio in the United States on April 13, 2021, as the fourth and final single from the album. To further promotion, a remix of the song produced by Dave Audé was released on May 12, 2021. It was later nominated at the 64th Annual Grammy Awards in the category of Best Remixed Recording, Non-Classical.

== Composition ==
"Met Him Last Night" was described by Billboard as "a dark, twisted fantasy about chilling with the devil and finding out that, well, he's kind of a funny, chill dude who might be relationship material", containing the lyrics "I've seen the devil, yeah, I met him last night/ One conversation, now he's spendin' the night," which an "urgent" Lovato sings "in a couplet that clearly has a much deeper meaning about flirting with disaster."

== Reception ==
Music critics labeled "Met Him Last Night" as the most anticipated track from Dancing with the Devil... the Art of Starting Over. In reviews of the album, "Met Him Last Night" was referred to by NME as a "dark and atmospheric electro bop", and Neil McCormick from The Daily Telegraph highlighted the song as not only "a flirty duet in which the seductive title character is the Devil" that "succeeds in both acknowledging the dangers of the high life and making fun of them at the same time," but that it reflects the way in which Lovato's album as an entirety pleasurably "succeeds in grappling with serious matters without jettisoning any of the lightness, melodiousness, nimble rhythms and sugar-high hooks of her pop genre."

== Credits and personnel ==
Recording and management

- Mixed at MixStar Studios (Virginia Beach, Virginia)
- Mastered at Sterling Sound Studios (Edgewater, New Jersey)
- Published by Thomas Lee Brown (ASCAP), Space Goats Publishing (BMI), Universal Music Group Corp. (ASCAP), GrandAri Music (ASCAP), Albert Stanaj (BMI)

Personnel

- Demi Lovato – vocals
- Ariana Grande – vocals, composition
- Tommy Brown – composition, production
- Courageous Xavier Herrera – composition, production
- Albert Stanaj – composition
- Mitch Allan – vocal production
- Billy Hickey – recording
- Serban Ghenea – mixing
- John Hanes – engineering
- Peter Lee Johnson – strings
- Chris Gehringer – mastering

Credits adapted from the liner notes of Dancing with the Devil... the Art of Starting Over.

== Charts ==
Chart performance for "Met Him Last Night"
Chart (2021)	Peak position
Belgium (Ultratip Bubbling Under Flanders)	33
Canada Hot 100 (Billboard)	48
Global 200 (Billboard)	29
Greece International (IFPI)	88
Hungary (Single Top 40)	37
Ireland (IRMA)	32
Lithuania (AGATA)	66
New Zealand Hot Singles (RMNZ)	3
Norway (VG-lista)	39
Portugal (AFP)	42
Slovakia (Singles Digitál Top 100)	80
Sweden Heatseeker (Sverigetopplistan)	5
Switzerland (Schweizer Hitparade)	88
UK Singles (Official Charts)	44
US Billboard Hot 100	61
US Adult Pop Airplay (Billboard)	32
US Pop Airplay (Billboard)	37

== Certifications ==
Region	Certification	Certified units/sales
Brazil (Pro-Música Brasil)	Platinum	40,000^{‡}
^{‡} Sales+streaming figures based on certification alone.

== Release history ==
Release dates and formats for "Met Him Last Night"
Region	Date	Format(s)	Version	Label(s)	Ref.
Various	April 2, 2021	Digital download; streaming	Original	Island	
United States	April 13, 2021	Contemporary hit radio	Original	Island; Republic	
Various	May 12, 2021	Digital download; streaming	Dave Audé remix	Island	
