= Albert Stanaj =

Albanian-born American singer and songwriter (born 1994)

- Born: Daniel Albert Stanaj; 12 February 1994 (age 32); Shkodër, Albania
- Citizenship: Albania; United States
- Occupations: Singer; songwriter
- Years active: 2016–present
- Musical career
- Genres: Pop rock
- Instruments: Guitar, piano
- Label: Republic
- Website: stanaj.com

Daniel Albert Stanaj (Albanian: [alˈbɛɾt staˈnaj]; born 12 February 1994), known professionally as Stanaj, is an Albanian-born American singer and songwriter.

== Life and career ==
=== 1994–present: Early life and continued success ===
Stanaj was born to an Albanian family on 12 February 1994 in Shkodër, Albania and was raised in the city of New York, the United States. He attended the Archbishop Stepinac High School in White Plains, New York. He also participated in numerous music festivals in Albania, Europe as well as the United States. At 18, he moved to Los Angeles to continue his professional musical career. His debut single "Ain't Love Strange" released in 2016 peaked at number two in Albania.

== Artistry ==
Stanaj has cited Justin Timberlake, Maxwell, Michael Jackson and Whitney Houston as his major influences.

== Discography ==
=== Albums ===
==== Extended plays ====
List of extended plays, with selected chart positions
Title	Album details	Peak chart positions
Title	Album details	US
The Preview	Released: 9 August 2016; Label: Republic Records; Format: Digital download, streaming	— (Note: The Preview did not enter the Billboard Album Chart, but peaked at number 13 on the Heatseekers Albums chart.)
From a Distance	Released: 27 January 2017; Label: Republic Records; Format: Digital download, streaming	—
"—" denotes a recording that did not chart or was not released in that territory.

=== Singles ===
==== As lead artist ====
List of singles as lead artist, with selected chart positions
Title	Year	Peak chart positions			Album
Title	Year	ALB	CIS	NL	Album
"Ain't Love Strange"	2016	2	—	—	The Preview
"Bad Woman"	2017	—	295	—	From a Distance
"Romantic"	2017	1	—	93	From a Distance
"The Way I Love Her"	2017	18	—	—	Non-album singles
"Dirty Mind" (featuring Ty Dolla Sign)	2018	—	—	—	Non-album singles
"Amorfoda"	2018	—	—	—	Non-album singles
"Sunflower"	2019	—	—	—	Non-album singles
"Sweat"	2019	—	—	—	Non-album singles
"Love Me"	2019	—	—	—	Non-album singles
"405"	2019	—	—	—	Non-album singles
"Last Girlfriend"	2021	—	—	—	Non-album singles
"—" denotes a recording that did not chart or was not released in that territory.

==== As featured artist ====
List of singles as featured artist, with selected chart positions
Title	Year	Peak chart positions			Album
Title	Year	US	ALB	NL	Album
"Playing to Lose" (Lemaitre featuring Stanaj)	2016	—	—	—	Chapter One
"Bed of Roses" (Afrojack featuring Stanaj)	2018	—	—	28	Non-album singles
"You Remind Me" (Gryffin featuring Stanaj)	2018	— (Note: "You Remind Me" did not enter the Billboard Hot 100, but peaked at number 25 on the Dance/Electronic Digital Songs and number 43 on the Dance/Electronic Songs chart.)	—	—	Non-album singles
"Sober" (Afrojack featuring Rae Sremmurd and Stanaj)	2019	—	—	—	Non-album singles
"Momma Always Told Me" (Mike Posner featuring Yung Bae and Stanaj)	2021	—	—	—	Non-album singles
"—" denotes a recording that did not chart or was not released in that territory.

==== Other charted songs ====
List of other charted songs, with selected chart positions
Title	Year	Peak chart positions	Album
Title	Year	CIS	Album
"Changed"	2017	333	From a Distance
"Find me"	2017	396	From a Distance
"Romantic (NOTD Remix)"	2017	329	From a Distance
"—" denotes a recording that did not chart or was not released in that territory.

=== Songwriting credits ===
Song	Year	Artist(s)	Album	Ref.
"34+35"	2020	Ariana Grande	Positions	
"Met Him Last Night"	2021	Demi Lovato	Dancing with the Devil... the Art of Starting Over	
