= I Love You, Please Don't Hate Me =

Studio album by Sam Fischer
- Released: 1 December 2023
- Length: 46:03
- Label: RCA
- Producers: Stuart Crichton; John Hume; King Henry; Lostboy; Ryan Marrone; M-Phazes; Jorgen Odegard; Jordan Riley; Jimmy Robbins; Aidan Rodriguez; Rykeyz; Fraser T. Smith; Peter Thomas; Two Inch Punch; Wendy Wang

Sam Fischer chronology
Homework (2020)	I Love You, Please Don't Hate Me (2023)

Singles from I Love You, Please Don't Hate Me
- 1. "What Other People Say" Released: 4 February 2021; 2. "Hopeless Romantic" Released: 15 October 2021; 3. "Carry It Well" Released: 4 November 2022; 4. "You Don't Call Me Anymore" Released: 3 February 2023; 5. "High on You" Released: 24 February 2023; 6. "Alright" Released: 2 June 2023; 7. "Afterglow" Released: 1 September 2023; 8. "Hard to Love" Released: 24 November 2023

I Love You, Please Don't Hate Me is the debut studio album by Australian singer Sam Fischer, released on 1 December 2023 through RCA Records. It was announced in March 2023.

In an interview with For Your Consideration in June 2023, Fischer said "I'm so excited for this album to come out. It's an exploration of the relationship that I have with myself, and the way that things have gone over the last four years" adding "it feels like I've spent a lifetime writing it".

== Track listing ==
I Love You, Please Don't Hate Me track listing
No.	Title	Writer(s)	Producer(s)	Length
1.	"I Love You, Please Don't Hate Me"	Sam Fischer; Henry Brill; Ryan Marrone	M-Phazes; Marrone	3:02
2.	"Afterglow"	Fischer; Peter Thomas	Thomas	3:12
3.	"Hopeless Romantic"	Fischer; Mark Landon; Marc-Lo; Aiden Rodriguez	M-Phazes; Rodriguez	3:18
4.	"This City"	Fischer; Jackson Morgan; James Robbins	Jimmy Robbins	3:15
5.	"What Other People Say" (with Demi Lovato)	Fischer; Demi Lovato; Geoff Warburton; Ryan Williamson	Rykeyz^{[p]}; Mitch Allan^{[v]}	3:15
6.	"You Don't Call Me Anymore"	Fischer; Ben Ash; Mack Jamieson; David Kennett; Britten Newbill	Two Inch Punch; M-Phazes^{[v]}	2:55
7.	"Landslide"	Fischer; Ink; Wendy Wang; Warburton	Wang	3:34
8.	"Iceberg"	Fischer; Gez O'Connell; Jordan Riley	Riley	2:47
9.	"Hard to Love"	Fischer; Jon Hume; Lindy Robbins; Warburton	Hume	2:47
10.	"Watching My World Fall Apart"	Fischer; Fraser T. Smith	Smith; M-Phazes^{[a]}	2:31
11.	"Alright" (with Meghan Trainor)	Fischer; Newbill; Rykeyz; Megan Trainor	Rykeyz	2:52
12.	"High On You" (with Amy Shark)	Fischer; King Henry; Sasha Alex Sloan	King Henry	3:13
13.	"Secondhand Happiness"	Fischer; Tom Mann; Peter Rycroft	Lostboy	3:04
14.	"Somebody Cares"	Stuart Crichton	Crichton; ^{[a]}	2:46
15.	"Carry It Well"	Fischer; Ryan Marrone	Ryan Marrone; Jorgen Odegard	3:32
Total length:				46:03

Notes

- ^{^[p]} signifies a primary and vocal producer.
- ^{^[a]} signifies an additional producer.
- ^{^[v]} signifies a vocal producer.

== Personnel ==
Musicians

- Sam Fischer – vocals (all tracks), background vocals (tracks 2, 5, 8, 10), choir (5)
- Glen Hopper – bass guitar, guitar, organ, piano (track 1)
- Anthony Johnson – choir (track 1)
- Camille Grigsby – choir (track 1)
- Cassandra Grigsby Chism – choir (track 1)
- James Connor – choir (track 1)
- Jason McGee – choir (track 1)
- Quishima Dixon – choir (track 1)
- Teresa Davis – choir (track 1)
- Peter Thomas – acoustic guitar, background vocals, bass guitar, drums, electric guitar, keyboards, percussion, programming, strings, synthesizer (track 2)
- Aidan Rodriguez – piano (track 3)
- Mark Landon – programming (track 3)
- Alexis James – background vocals, choir (track 5)
- Ayanna Howard – background vocals, choir (track 5)
- Chelsea West – background vocals, choir (track 5)
- Desiree Washington – background vocals, choir (track 5)
- Erin Cafferky – background vocals, choir (track 5)
- Kaye Fox – background vocals, choir (track 5)
- Steve Epting – background vocals, choir (track 5)
- Taelor Murphy – background vocals, choir (track 5)
- Craig Nelson – bass guitar (track 5)
- Ryan Williamson – bass guitar, drums, keyboards, percussion (track 5)
- Carole Rabinowitz – cello (track 5)
- Sarighani Reist – cello (track 5)
- Pat McManus – guitar (track 5)
- Elizabeth Wilson Lamb – viola (track 5)
- Monisa Phillips Angell – viola (track 5)
- Demi Lovato – vocals (track 5)
- Ben Ash – bass guitar, drums, guitar, programming (track 6)
- Mack Jamieson – piano (track 6)
- Gez O'Connell – background vocals (track 8)
- Jordan Riley – bass guitar, guitar, keyboards, programming (track 8)
- Jon Hume – bass guitar, drums, piano (track 9)
- Rosie Danvers – strings (track 9)
- Fraser T. Smith – guitar, keyboards, piano, programming (track 10)
- Rykeyz – all instruments (track 11)
- Meghan Trainor – vocals (track 11)
- King Henry – acoustic guitar, bass guitar, electric guitar, programming (track 12)
- Lostboy – keyboards, programming (track 13)
- Geoff Warburton – guitar (track 15)
- Ryan Marrone – guitar, piano (track 15)

Technical

- Chris Gehringer – mastering
- Rob Kinelski – mixing (tracks 1–3, 6–15)
- Jimmy Robbins – mixing (track 4)
- Josh Gudwin – mixing (track 5)
- Peter Thomas – engineering (track 2)
- M-Phazes – engineering (track 3)
- Ryan Dulude – engineering (track 5)
- Ben Ash – engineering (track 6)
- Jordan Riley – engineering (track 8)
- Jon Hume – engineering (track 9)
- Justin Trainor – engineering (track 11)
- Rykeyz – engineering (track 11)
- King Henry – engineering (track 12)
- Stuart Crichton – engineering (track 14)
- Brad Hosking – vocal engineering (track 12)
- Matt Bartlem – vocal engineering (track 12)
- Heidi Wang – engineering assistance (track 5)
