= Grey (given name) =

Grey is a given name. Notable people with the name include:

- Grey Blake (1902–1971), British actor
- Grey Brydges, 5th Baron Chandos (c. 1580 – 1621), English nobleman and courtier
- Grey Clarke (1912–1993), nicknamed "Noisy", American baseball player
- Grey Cooper (c. 1726 – 1801), English politician
- Grey Crawford (born 1951), American conceptual artist
- Grey Damon (born 1987), American actor
- Grey DeLisle (born 1973), or Grey Griffin, American voice actress, comedian, and singer-songwriter
- Grey Ferris (1946–2008), American lawyer, farmer, and politician
- Grey Gowrie (1939–2021), 2nd Earl of Gowrie, Irish-born British peer, politician, and businessman
- Grey Mabhalani Bango (fl. 1950s), Rhodesian trade-unionist and chief of the Kalanga people
- Grey Malunga (fl. from 2009), Malawian politician and educator
- Grey McLeish (1915–1957), Canadian rower
- Grey Mills (fl. from 2008), American politician
- Grey Neville (1681–1723), English landowner and politician
- Grey Ruegamer (born 1976), American football player
- Grey Skipwith (1771–1852), 8th Baronet, English politician
- Grey Stafford (fl. 2010), American animal trainer, zoologist, and educator
- Grey Villet (1927–2000), American–South African photojournalist
- Grey Wiese (born 1981), German singer-songwriter and TV personality
- Grey Zabel (born 2002), American football player
