= Grey High School (disambiguation) =

Grey High School is a boys' school in Port Elizabeth, South Africa.

Grey High School may also refer to:

- Grey High School (California), a continuation school in the Los Angeles Unified School District
- Point Grey Secondary School, Vancouver, British Columbia, Canada

== See also ==
- Grey College (disambiguation)
- Gray High School (disambiguation)
