= The Grey (disambiguation) =

The Grey is a 2011 American thriller and survival film.

The Grey may also refer to:

- The Grey (restaurant), a restaurant in the United States
- The Grey (EP), by Agalloch, 2024
- The Grey, an EP by Levinhurst
- "The Grey", a song by Asking Alexandria from See What's on the Inside
- "The Grey", a song by Bad Omens from The Death of Peace of Mind
- "The Grey", a song by Bury Tomorrow from Cannibal
- "The Grey", a song by Lala Hsu from The Inner Me
- "The Grey", a song by Tesseract from War of Being
- "The Grey", a song by Thrice from Palms
- "The Grey", an episode of For All Mankind
- "The Gray", a song by the band Sharptooth

== See also ==
- Grey (disambiguation)
