= Robert Dumakude Bango =

Zimbabwean DJ

Robert Dumakude Bango (born Southern Rhodesia, now Zimbabwe, a descendant of the Kalanga people) is a DJ, music journalist, and radio programmer. He is the son of Grey Mabhalani Bango, a trade-unionist and tribal chief who served as guide to Joshua Nkomo during his 1953 visit to the shrines of the Matopos Hills (now Matobo National Park).

Arriving in London from the then unrecognised state of Rhodesia in 1974, he worked at the Hard Rock Cafe as a dishwasher, where he was discovered by Thin Lizzy frontman Phil Lynott when one of his homemade mixtapes was played over the sound system.

From 1976-1980 Bango ran the Camden Town record shop Sapien Sounds with Susan Alpert (cousin of musician and A&M Records founder Herb Alpert), a hangout that was frequented by members of the Eurythmics and the Buzzcocks, among others. He also worked as a DJ at local venues and on Radio London.

Since moving to Australia in 1981, Bango has DJ'd at the radio stations 6UVS Fm (now RTRFM, Perth), Triple J Fm (national) and Bondi Fm (Sydney), as well as at nightclubs Australia-wide. He has also written for the music publications Rock Australia magazine, Countdown magazine, Rolling Stone and the Melody Maker.

Bango is currently a DJ and programmer on the internet station network Lortron.com, via his radio/arts channel, 'Rhythm, Passion and Grace' (RPG). He lives in Byron Bay, northern New South Wales.
