= Gray High School =

Gray High School may refer to:

- Colonel Gray High School, Charlottetown, Prince Edward Island, Canada
- John Gray High School, George Town, Cayman Islands

== See also ==
- Grey High School (disambiguation)
