= Melon Cake =

2021 song by Demi Lovato

Song by Demi Lovato

from the album Dancing with the Devil... the Art of Starting Over
- Studio: SuCasa Recording (Los Angeles, California)
- Genre: Pop
- Length: 3:32
- Label: Island
- Songwriters: Demi Lovato; Eren Cannata; Julia Michaels; Justin Tranter; Keith "Ten4" Sorrells; Warren "Oak" Felder
- Producers: Eren Cannata; Oak; Alex Nice; Keith "Ten4" Sorrells

Music video
- "Melon Cake" on YouTube

"Melon Cake" is a song recorded by the American singer Demi Lovato for her seventh studio album, Dancing with the Devil... the Art of Starting Over, which was released through Island Records in 2021. Lovato wrote it along with Julia Michaels, Justin Tranter, and its producers Eren Cannata, Warren "Oak" Felder, and Keith "Ten4" Sorrells. Alex Nice also provided production.

The title of the song is a reference to Lovato's past hyper-restricted diet, and its lyrics emphasize on a "good-riddance send-off" to her old management. "Melon Cake" received generally positive reviews from critics. A Hannah Lux Davis-directed music video for the track premiered exclusively on Facebook on August 20, 2021, and was released on Lovato's Vevo channel on the following day.

== Composition ==
"Melon Cake" is a pop track, described by Vulture as a "catchy" song that doubles as a break-up song with restrictive diet culture. Its title is a reference to Lovato's former diet, hyper-restricted by her team, where her birthday cake was a "watermelon cake where you cut your watermelon into the shape of a cake and you put fat-free whipped cream on top", according to what the singer stated in an interview with the Ellen DeGeneres Show in 2020. On the song, Lovato also emphasizes on "overcoming her demons".

== Critical reception ==
Quinn Moreland for Pitchfork called the song "synthy", and wrote: "Even as Lovato confidently declares that melon cakes are a thing of the past, the image is so depressing [it is] difficult to focus on anything else, especially on what is intended to be a fun song. But [is not] that what so many of us do to survive? We attempt to reframe our traumas as lessons learned; we use humor as a defense mechanism; we move on because dwelling in guilt or shame furthers the destructive spiral". The Line of Best Fit's Rachel Saywitz found the track "awkwardly self-reflecting", but also "a revealing look at how strict diet regulation was harmful, and her joy to be without it makes for a celebratory listen". Writing for The Daily Telegraph, Neil McCormick dubbed "Melon Cake" as "the most cheerful song about anorexia you will ever hear". Patrick Ryan of USA Today named "Melon Cake" as the best song on Dancing with the Devil... the Art of Starting Over and a fan-favorite.

== Music video ==
The music video for "Melon Cake" was directed by Hannah Lux Davis. It premiered exclusively on Facebook on August 20, 2021, as part of Lovato's 29th birthday, and released on her Vevo channel on the following day. In a statement presenting it, she wrote: "No more melon cakes on birthdays...29, I'm here today and I'm happy you are too". The video has a "candy-colored" theme and it sees Lovato "embracing joy and apologizing to [her] past self for what [she] went through". It begins with the singer buying a girl a birthday cake at a bakery, and then transitions to Lovato in a black jumpsuit, jacket, and cowboy hat in front of colored visuals and background dancers, where she sings along to the lyrics of the track. Glitter Magazine described the video as "a true moment of self-expression for Lovato".

== Personnel ==
Performers and musicians

- Demi Lovato – vocals
- Eren Cannata – guitar, bass guitar, keyboards, drum programming
- Alex Nice – keyboards
- Oak – drums, keyboards
- Keith Sorrells – guitar, drum programming

Technical

- Eren Cannata – production
- Chris Gehringer – mastering
- Eric J – mixing
- Alex Nice – co-production
- Oak – vocal production, recording
- Keith Sorrells – co-production

Credits adapted from Dancing with the Devil... the Art of Starting Over.
