= What Other People Say =

Single by Sam Fischer and Demi Lovato

from the album Dancing with the Devil... the Art of Starting Over and I Love You, Please Don't Hate Me
- Released: 4 February 2021
- Studio: Westlake Recording Studios (Hollywood, CA)
- Length: 3:14
- Label: RCA; Island
- Songwriters: Demi Lovato; Geoff Warburton; Ryan Williamson; Sam Fischer
- Producer: Rykeyz

Sam Fischer singles chronology
"For Now" (2020)	"What Other People Say" (2021)	"Simple" (2021)

Demi Lovato singles chronology
"Monsters" (2020)	"What Other People Say" (2021)	"Dancing with the Devil" (2021)

Music video
- "What Other People Say" on YouTube

"What Other People Say" is a song by Australian singer-songwriter Sam Fischer and American singer Demi Lovato. It was released on 4 February 2021 by RCA and Island Records on digital download and streaming formats as the second single from Lovato's seventh studio album Dancing with the Devil... the Art of Starting Over and Fischer's debut studio album I Love You, Please Don't Hate Me. The song was written by both Lovato and Fischer alongside Geoff Warburton and Ryan Williamson.

The song became a top 40 hit in Fischer's home country of Australia in addition to New Zealand and The Netherlands. At the 2021 ARIA Music Awards, the song was nominated for Song of the Year.

== Background and composition ==
"What Other People Say" was announced via social media on 2 February 2021. Posting to Twitter, Lovato said "these lyrics are so special to my heart" and that they could not wait to share the track. Fischer later shared a snippet of the track via TikTok where the audio was used in over 15,000 videos before its official release.

Fischer wrote the song years ago, initially for another artist, and said in a statement that he always knew that the song was destined to be a duet. Fischer said he was "blown away" when Lovato agreed to sing on the track with him, and added that the song is "a confession, realizing how far away you can get from who you are in an effort to be liked."

About his collaboration with Lovato, Fischer told Metro that Lovato was "incredible" and he was "honoured to have Lovato on ['What Other People Say'] and [...] connected deeply with the song". "What Other People Say" is about the "feeling of being alone and not wanting to let people down". Lovato said, "This song is a reflection on what it's like to lose who you truly are in an effort to please other people and society. It's why I wanted to make this song with Sam – ultimately it's about two humans coming together to connect and find solutions to their problems". Fischer described that the song as "about the pressures of society and how getting caught up with the wrong things can change you."

== Critical reception ==
Upon the song's release, Jennifer Drysdale from Entertainment Tonight called the duet a "moving song" between Lovato and Fischer, and noted how Lovato was a "fitting duet partner" on the song. Danielle Pascual from Billboard ranked the song as one of Lovato's best collaborations in her entire discography, describing it as a "powerful emotional ballad" that "showcases her varied range while giving Fischer room to soar".

== Music video ==
The official music video was released on Lovato and Fischer's YouTube channels on 16 February 2021. It depicts the pair performing the song inside of and atop a moving train.

=== Lyric video ===
The lyric video, released on YouTube, shows Lovato and Fischer as cartoon characters in a Guess Who?-style board game, and the cartoons reflect the stereotypical labels society imposes on Lovato and Fischer, including "Angelic, Naughty, Scary, Aloof" for Lovato.

== Track listing ==
Digital download

1. "What Other People Say" – 3:14

Digital download – Sam Feldt Remix

1. "What Other People Say" (Sam Feldt Remix) – 3:01

Digital download – Stripped Version

1. "What Other People Say" (Stripped Version) – 3:28

Digital download – R3HAB Remix

1. "What Other People Say" (R3HAB Remix) – 2:34

== Personnel ==
=== Song credits ===
Recording and management

- Recorded at Westlake Recording Studios (Los Angeles, California)
- Mixed at Henson Recording Studios (Los Angeles, California)
- Mastered at Sterling Sound Studios (Edgewater, New Jersey)
- Published by DDLovato Music/Universal Music Corp. (ASCAP), Sony/ATC Music Publishing, Geoff Warburton (SOCAN), Sony/ATV Ballad (BMI), Sam Fischer (SESAC)

Personnel

- Sam Fischer – vocals, composition, choir
- Demi Lovato – vocals, composition
- Ryan "Rykeyz" Williamson – production, composition, programming, drums, bass, keyboards, percussion, vocal production, string orchestration, choir
- Geoff Warburton – composition
- Mitch Allan – vocal production
- Scott Robinson – recording
- Ryan Dulude – recording
- Josh Gudwin – mixing
- Heidi Wang – assistant mixing
- Pat McManus – guitar
- David Davidson – violin
- David Angell – violin
- Conni Ellisor – violin
- Karen Winkelmann – violin
- Jane Darnall – violin
- Monisa Angell – viola
- Elizabeth Lamb – viola
- Steve Epting – choir
- Vegaz Taelor – choir
- Chelsea "Peaches" West – choir
- Alexis James – choir
- Kaye Fox – choir
- Desiree "DeSz" Washington – choir
- Ayanna Elese – choir
- Erin Cafferky – choir
- Chris Gehringer – mastering

Credits adapted from the liner notes of Dancing with the Devil... the Art of Starting Over.

=== Music video credits ===
Music video credits adapted from YouTube.

- Dano Cerny – director
- Michelle Larkin – producer
- Missy Galanida – executive producer
- Isaac Rice – executive producer
- Nicholas Weisnet – director of photographer
- Elizabet Puksto – art director
- Jennifer Kennedy – editor
- Matt Osborne – colorist
- Ingenuity Studios – VFX

== Charts ==
=== Weekly charts ===
Weekly chart performance for "What Other People Say"
Chart (2021–2024)	Peak position
Australia (ARIA)	39
Belgium (Ultratip Bubbling Under Flanders)	17
Canada Hot 100 (Billboard)	89
Estonia Airplay (TopHit)	26
Global 200 (Billboard)	125
Ireland (IRMA)	60
Netherlands Single Tip (MegaCharts)	28
New Zealand (Recorded Music NZ)	37
Sweden Heatseeker (Sverigetopplistan)	13
UK Singles (OCC)	58
US Bubbling Under Hot 100 (Billboard)	7
US Adult Pop Airplay (Billboard)	28

=== Monthly charts ===
Monthly chart performance for "What Other People Say"
Chart (2024)	Position
Estonia Airplay (TopHit)	46

=== Year-end charts ===
2021 year-end chart performance for "What Other People Say"
Chart (2021)	Position
Australian Artist (ARIA)	18

2024 year-end chart performance for "What Other People Say"
Chart (2024)	Position
Estonia Airplay (TopHit)	59

== Certifications ==
Certifications for "What Other People Say"
Region	Certification	Certified units/sales
Australia (ARIA)	Platinum	70,000^{‡}
New Zealand (RMNZ)	Platinum	30,000^{‡}
United Kingdom (BPI)	Silver	200,000^{‡}
^{‡} Sales+streaming figures based on certification alone.

== Release history ==
Release history for "What Other People Say"
Region	Date	Format	Label	Ref.
Various	4 February 2021	Digital download; streaming	RCA; Island	
Italy	12 February 2021	Contemporary hit radio	Sony	
United States	15 February 2021	Adult contemporary radio	RCA	
