= Sam Fischer =

Australian musician (born 1991)

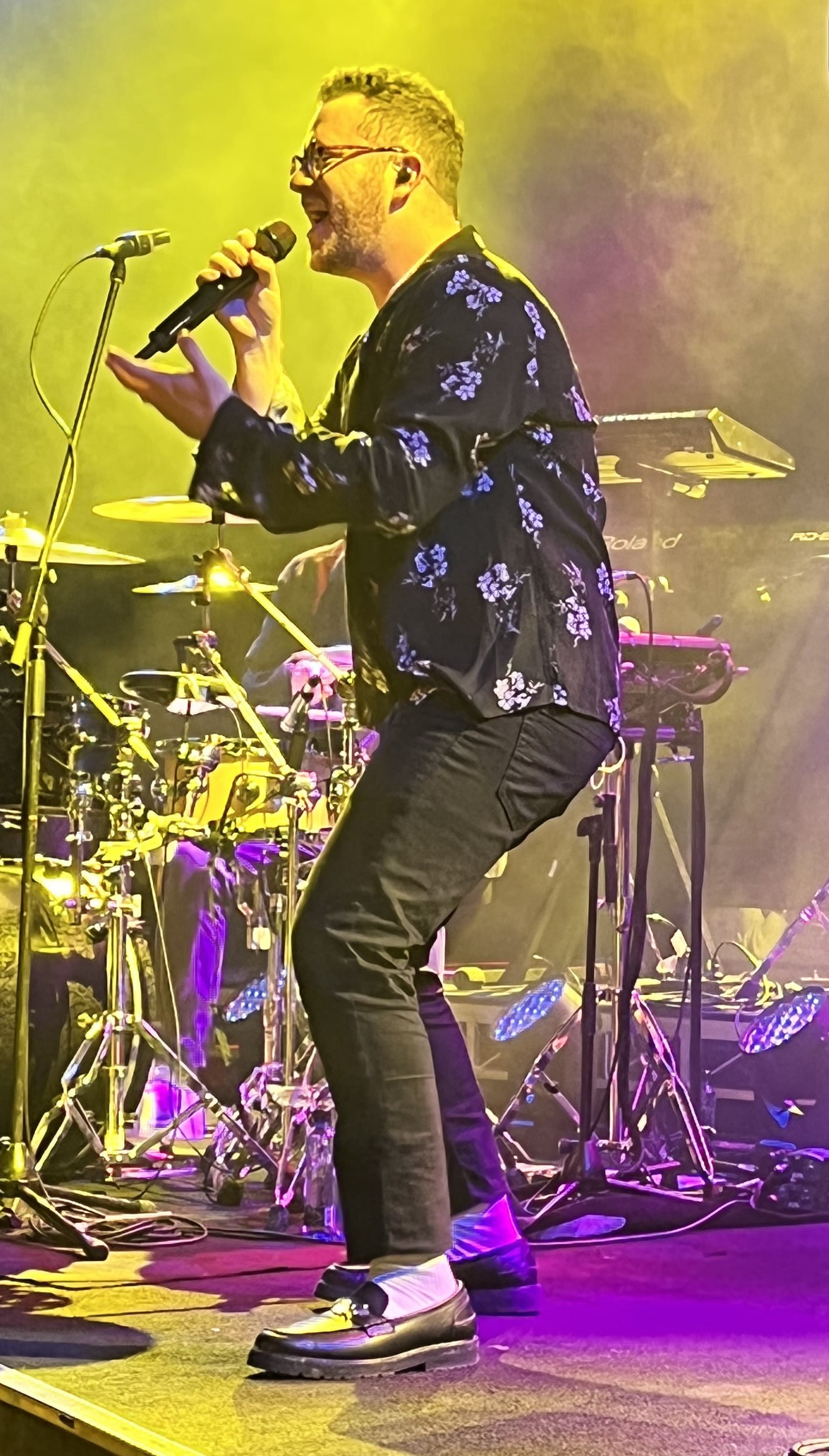
- Fischer performing in Sydney, New South Wales in 2022

Background information
- Born: Samuel Fischer; 5 July 1991 (age 35); Sydney, New South Wales, Australia
- Genres: R&B; soul; neo-soul; pop rock
- Years active: 2012–present
- Label: RCA
- Website: www.samfischermusic.com

Samuel Fischer (born 5 July 1991) is an Australian pop rock singer-songwriter and musician. Fischer released music independently before signing with RCA Records in 2019. RCA re-released his debut EP Not a Hobby in January 2020.

== Life and career ==
=== Early life ===
Fischer was born outside of Sydney in 1991 and grew up on a farm in the town of Grose Vale, just outside Sydney, New South Wales. His musical life began at age three when he started playing violin after being inspired by seeing a performance by Queenie. He moved with his family to Sydney when he was seven, and at age 10 took up the saxophone, later playing in his high school jazz band. By age 12, he was writing songs, learning to do so after listening to Human Nature's self-titled album (which included songs such as He Don't Love You, When We Were Young and Don't Come Back) which his parents had bought for him. He attended Sydney Grammar School and later the Conservatorium High School in Sydney. In 2010 he was accepted to Berklee College of Music in Boston, and moved to that city to study music. He is classically trained on saxophone and violin. At Berklee he joined the a cappella troupe Pitch Slapped and was a member when the group won the International Championship of Collegiate A Cappella in 2014.

=== 2012–2021: Not a Hobby ===
Fischer's debut release was as a featured artist on Alex Preston's single "Heartbeats" in July 2012. In September 2014, after graduating from Berklee, Fischer moved to Los Angeles, where he was active in the local a cappella scene and sang backing vocals for the band Holychild while writing songs and aiming for success as an artist on his own.

In May 2016, Fischer released his first single "Lean". The following year he released the singles "Same Friends", which premiered at Billboard on 10 November 2017 and "Getting Older". Fischer featured on Opia's single "Secrets".

In January 2018, Fischer released his debut EP, Not a Hobby. In May 2018, Fischer released a second EP titled Sam Fischer (Our Vinyl Sessions), featuring acoustic recordings of "Getting Older", "Same Friends" and "Lean". In January 2019, Fischer collaboration with London's Black Saint on "Everybody Wants You" which became a dance in mid-2019. The same year, he toured with Lewis Capaldi. Later in 2019, Fischer was signed by RCA Records who re-released "This City" in December 2019 and re-released Not a Hobby EP in January 2020. Not a Hobby peaked at number 15 on the Australian Artist Singles Chart on 9 March 2020.

Fischer has worked with a variety of producers and has written songs for artists including Ciara ("Dose"), Elle King, Sabrina Claudio, Keith Urban, MAX, Christian French, Andy Grammer, Saygrace, and Jessie J.

In February 2021, Fischer released "What Other People Say", a collaboration with American singer, Demi Lovato. The track went on to peak within the top 100 in multiple regions, including the United Kingdom, at 70, and Australia, at 58, as well as within the top 20 in Scotland. The song was subsequently included on Lovato's seventh studio album, Dancing with the Devil... The Art of Starting Over.

=== 2022–present: I Love You, Please Don't Hate Me ===
In September 2022, Fischer returned to Australia for the first time since the COVID-19 pandemic, opening as a support act for British singer Mimi Webb on her tour of the country and New Zealand.

Fischer released his debut album, I Love You, Please Don't Hate Me, on 1 December 2023.

== Personal life ==
He is bisexual and has stated that he and his wife are not in a "straight" marriage.

== Discography ==
=== Albums ===
List of albums, with selected details
Title	Details
I Love You, Please Don't Hate Me	Released: 1 December 2023; Label: RCA (19658829962); Format: CD, LP, digital download, streaming

=== Extended plays ===
List of extended plays, with selected details
Title	Details	Peak chart positions	
Title	Details	AUS	UK Down.
Not a Hobby	Released: January 2018; Label: RI Entertainment; Formats: CD, digital download, streaming	— (Note: Not a Hobby did not enter the Australia (ARIA Charts) top 50, but peaked at number 15 on the Australian Artist Singles Chart.)	—
Sam Fischer (Our Vinyl Sessions)	Released: 10 May 2018; Label: Our Vinyl TV; Formats: Digital download, streaming	—	—
Homework	Released: 28 August 2020; Label: RCA; Formats: Digital download, streaming	—	82
"—" denotes a recording that did not chart or was not released in that territory.

=== Singles ===
==== As lead artist ====
Title	Year	Peak chart positions									Certifications	Album
Title	Year	AUS	BEL (WA) Tip	CAN	IRE	NZ	SCO	SWE Heat.	UK	US Bub.	Certifications	Album
"Lean"	2016	—	—	—	—	—	—	—	—	—		Non-album singles
"Same Friends"	2017	—	—	—	—	—	—	—	—	—		Non-album singles
"Getting Older"	2017	—	—	—	—	—	—	—	—	—		Not a Hobby
"Smoke"	2018	—	—	—	—	—	—	—	—	—		Not a Hobby
"This City"	2018	—	—	—	—	—	—	—	—	—		Not a Hobby
"Restless" (with The Gifted)	2018	—	—	—	—	—	—	—	—	—		Non-album singles
"We Won't Back Down" (with Dirtier Blonde)	2018	—	—	—	—	—	—	—	—	—		Non-album singles
"This City" (re-release)	2019	17	21	72	18	20	8	2	16	5	ARIA: 3× Platinum; BPI: 2× Platinum; MC: 2× Platinum; RIAA: Gold; RMNZ: 4× Platinum	Homework
"The Usual"	2020	—	—	—	—	—	—	—	—	—		Homework
"For Now"	2020	—	—	—	—	—	—	—	—	—		Non-album single
"What Other People Say" (with Demi Lovato)	2021	39	—	89	60	37	—	13	58	7	ARIA: Platinum; BPI: Silver; RMNZ: Platinum	Dancing with the Devil... the Art of Starting Over / I Love You, Please Don't Hate Me
"Simple"	2021	—	—	—	—	— (Note: "Simple" did not enter the NZ Top 40 Singles Chart, but peaked at number 31 on the NZ Hot Singles Chart.)	—	—	—	—		Non-album singles
"Pick Me Up" (with Sam Feldt)	2021	—	—	—	—	—	—	—	—	—		Non-album singles
"Hopeless Romantic"	2021	—	—	—	—	—	—	—	—	—		I Love You, Please Don't Hate Me
"All My Loving"	2022	—	—	—	—	—	—	—	—	—		Non-album single
"Carry It Well"	2022	—	—	—	—	—	—	—	—	—		I Love You, Please Don't Hate Me
"You Don't Call Me Anymore"	2023	—	—	—	—	— (Note: "You Don't Call Me Anymore" did not enter the NZ Top 40 Singles Chart, but peaked at number 30 on the NZ Hot Singles Chart.)	—	—	—	—		I Love You, Please Don't Hate Me
"High on You" (with Amy Shark)	2023	—	—	—	—	—	—	—	—	—		I Love You, Please Don't Hate Me
"Alright" (with Meghan Trainor)	2023	—	—	—	—	— (Note: "Alright" did not enter the NZ Top 40 Singles Chart, but peaked at number 25 on the NZ Hot Singles Chart.)	—	—	—	—		I Love You, Please Don't Hate Me
"Afterglow"	2023	—	—	—	—	—	—	—	—	—		I Love You, Please Don't Hate Me
"Hard to Love"	2023	—	—	—	—	—	—	—	—	—		I Love You, Please Don't Hate Me
"Parents"	2024	—	—	—	—	—	—	—	—	—		TBA
"Summer of Love" (with James Carter and Leony)	2024	—	—	—	—	—	—	—	—	—		TBA
"Love Life"	2025	—	—	—	—	—	—	—	—	—		TBA
"Moonshine"	2025	—	—	—	—	—	—	—	—	—		TBA
"Conversations We Never Had"	2025	—	—	—	—	—	—	—	—	—		TBA
"Sweet Contradiction"	2025	—	—	—	—	—	—	—	—	—		TBA
"A Heart Doesn't Hurt Itself"	2026	—	—	—	—	—	—	—	—	—		TBA
"—" denotes a recording that did not chart or was not released in that territory.

==== As featured artist ====
Title	Year	Peak chart positions	Album
Title	Year	AUS	Album
"Heartbeats" (Alex Preston featuring Sam Fischer)	2012	—	Non-album single
"Secrets" (Opia featuring Sam Fischer)	2017	—	Faded
"Everybody Wants You" (Black Saint featuring Sam Fischer)	2019	—	Everybody Wants You
"Antidote" (Guy Sebastian featuring Sam Fischer)	2024	— (Note: "Antidote" did not enter the ARIA Top 100 Singles Chart, but peaked at number 2 on the ARIA Digital Track Chart.)	100 Times Around the Sun
"Shine" (Toby Romeo featuring Sam Fischer)	2024	—	
"—" denotes a recording that did not chart or was not released in that territory.

==== Promotional singles ====
Title	Year	Album
"Everybody's Got Somebody"	2020	Homework
"I Got to Live"	2020	Homework

== Awards and nominations ==
=== ARIA Music Awards ===
The ARIA Music Awards are a series of annual awards, which recognise excellence, innovation, and achievement across all genres of Australian music.

Year	Nominee / work	Award	Result	Ref.
2020	"This City"	Song of the Year	Nominated	
2021	"What Other People Say" (with Demi Lovato)	Song of the Year	Nominated	
