= This City (Sam Fischer song) =

Single by Sam Fischer

from the EP Not a Hobby and Homework and the album I Love You, Please Don't Hate Me
- Released: 18 January 2019; 13 December 2019 (re-release)
- Recorded: 2017
- Genre: Soft rock
- Length: 3:14
- Label: RCA; Sony
- Songwriter(s): Sam Fischer; Jackson Morgan; Jimmy Robbins
- Producer(s): Jimmy Robbins

Sam Fischer singles chronology
"Smoke" (2018)	"This City" (2019)	"Restless" (2018)

Sam Fischer singles chronology
"Everybody Wants You" (2019)	"This City" (2019)	"The Usual" (2020)

Music video
- "This City" on YouTube

"This City" is a song by Australian recording artist Sam Fischer. The song was recorded in 2017 and was released on 18 January 2019 as the third and final single from Fischer's debut EP Not a Hobby. Fisher said "I wrote this with James Michael Robbins and Jackson Morgan on a day when I felt pretty damn defeated by LA. Change is really hard, but so important. This is my experience, one that almost everyone goes through, hope it helps in some way."

After signing with RCA Records in 2019, the song was re-released on 13 December 2019 as the first single from Fischer's third EP Homework.

The song was included on Fischer's debut studio album, I Love You, Please Don't Hate Me (2023).

== Background and composition ==
Fischer wrote "This City" in 2016 and it was released in early 2018 where it was shared by people including Meghan Trainor and Lewis Capaldi. In 2020 Fischer reflects saying "The song got a lot of eyes on it, but it wasn't getting any love from anyone for a long time except for the fans. When I say anyone, I mean Spotify, Apple, Amazon. But it was a fan-favourite."

18 months later, it was featured on TikTok and as Fischer says "It changed everything for me". The exposure lead to Fischer receiving a DM from RCA Records UK which lead to the signing.

== Track listings ==
Original
No.	Title	Length
1.	"This City"	3:14

Luca Schreiner remix
No.	Title	Length
1.	"This City" (Luca Schreiner remix)	2:56

Acoustic
No.	Title	Length
1.	"This City" (Acoustic remix)	3:26

Frank Walker remix
No.	Title	Length
1.	"This City" (Frank Walker remix)	2:50

Camilo remix
No.	Title	Length
1.	"This City" (Camilo remix)	3:16

Anne-Marie remix
No.	Title	Length
1.	"This City" (Anne-Marie remix)	3:17

with Nico Santos
No.	Title	Length
1.	"This City" (with Nico Santos)	3:14

== Charts ==
=== Weekly charts ===
Chart (2019–2021)	Peak position
Australia (ARIA)	17
Belgium (Ultratip Bubbling Under Wallonia)	21
Canada (Canadian Hot 100)	72
Ireland (IRMA)	18
Lithuania (AGATA)	90
Netherlands (Single Tip)	6
New Zealand (Recorded Music NZ)	20
Portugal (AFP)	164
Scotland (OCC)	8
Sweden (Sverigetopplistan)	86
UK Singles (OCC)	16
US Bubbling Under Hot 100 Singles (Billboard)	5
US Adult Contemporary (Billboard)	29
US Adult Top 40 (Billboard)	13

=== Year-end charts ===
Chart (2020)	Position
Australia (ARIA)	36
New Zealand (Recorded Music NZ)	45
UK Singles (OCC)	35
US Adult Top 40 (Billboard)	30

Chart (2021)	Position
Australia (ARIA)	77

== Certifications ==
Region	Certification	Certified units/sales
Australia (ARIA)	3× Platinum	210,000^{‡}
Austria (IFPI Austria)	Gold	15,000^{‡}
Canada (Music Canada)	4× Platinum	320,000^{‡}
Denmark (IFPI Danmark)	Platinum	90,000^{‡}
France (SNEP)	Gold	100,000^{‡}
New Zealand (RMNZ)	4× Platinum	120,000^{‡}
Poland (ZPAV)	Gold	10,000^{‡}
Portugal (AFP)	Gold	5,000^{‡}
Spain (PROMUSICAE)	Gold	30,000^{‡}
United Kingdom (BPI)	2× Platinum	1,200,000^{‡}
United States (RIAA)	Gold	500,000^{‡}
^{‡} Sales+streaming figures based on certification alone.

== Release history ==
Region	Date	Format	Label	Version
Various	18 January 2018	Digital download	RI Entertainment	Original
Various	13 December 2019	Digital download, streaming	RCA; Sony Music	Original (re-release)
Australia	17 January 2020	Contemporary hit radio	Sony Music Australia	Original
Various	21 February 2020	Digital download, streaming	RCA; Sony Music	Luca Schreiner remix
United States	24 February 2020	Hot AC radio	RCA	Original
United States	17 March 2020	Contemporary hit radio	RCA	Original
Various	27 March 2020	Digital download, streaming	RCA; Sony Music	Acoustic
Various	3 April 2020	Digital download, streaming	RCA; Sony Music	Frank Walker remix
Various	28 May 2020	Digital download, streaming	RCA; Sony Music	Camilo remix
Various	29 May 2020	Digital download, streaming	RCA; Sony Music	Anne-Marie remix
Italy	19 June 2020	Contemporary hit radio	Sony	Original
Italy	19 June 2020	Contemporary hit radio	Sony	Anne-Marie remix
Various	26 June 2020	Digital download, streaming	RCA; Sony Music	with Nico Santos
