= Gray Light Car =

Cyclecar

The Gray Light Car was a cyclecar built in Longmont, Colorado, in 1920 by H A Gray. Only two prototypes were made and, though articles of incorporation for the Gray Light Car Corporation were filed in July, it never reached production. Company officers were given as Gray, H M Koutz, G E Gumston, E J Kiel, and J H Vickery. Koutz and Keil were cigar manufacturers.

Gray continued to promote the cars into early 1921, but was unable to raise sufficient interest or the $1 million capital to proceed. He had planned to start producing 25 automobiles per day at a 14,000 square foot factory in Longmont once the price of steel had stabilized. Steel prices had fallen after World War I but surged again in 1920.

Gray claimed to have advance orders for 2,500 cars. He did set up an experimental testing station at the McFarlane-Eggers Machinery Company on the corner of 28th and Blake Street, Denver.

Gray was unlikely to ever succeed. The large car companies such as Ford and Chevrolet had reduced their costs to the point where cyclecars needed to be produced on a very large scale in order to compete. A Model T cost $260 in the 1920s. Between 1920 and 1921 America was in a severe depression.

Prices for the Gray were set at $350 for a single cylinder motor cycle engined car and $450 for a twin cylinder. The cars used Harley-Davidson engines and weighted 850 lbs with a body and 540 lbs without. The car ran on motorcycle wheels and had room for two people. It was claimed to obtain 50 miles per gallon of gasoline. The cars transmission had two forward gears and reverse.
