= Gray Mountain (Grisham novel) =

2014 novel by John Grisham

- First edition (US)
- Author: John Grisham
- Language: English
- Genre: Legal thriller
- Publisher: Doubleday (US); Hodder & Stoughton (UK)
- Publication date: October 23, 2014
- Publication place: United States
- ISBN: 978-0-385-53714-8

Gray Mountain is a legal thriller novel by John Grisham, published in hardcover on October 23, 2014. The book is set in Appalachia after the Great Recession and follows third-year associate Samantha Kofer after the Bankruptcy of Lehman Brothers, when she becomes a legal clinic intern in Virginia's coal mining country.

== Plot ==
Samantha Kofer is a lawyer at a major New York City law firm, which is hit hard at the onset of the Great Recession. Rather than lay her off, the firm suggests that Sam conduct a charity service while she is put on furlough for a year. Sam takes up on the offer since she has no other choice and relocates to Virginia's Appalachian Mountains. She finds a job with a woman named Mattie, who runs a legal aid firm in the town of Brady. Mattie and another woman, Annette, take up cases in the town. At first, Sam does not fit in, but eventually warms up to Mattie and the townspeople.

Sam eventually meets Mattie's nephew, Donovan Gray. Donovan fills in that he and his firm have been battling against the strip-coal mining businesses in the town. Several employees of the coal mines work themselves until they are sick and the businesses have cut corners on safety measures, resulting in a few deaths. The coal mining has also contaminated the town's water supply.

Sam meets Donovan's brother Jeff, who acquired some important documents from the coal businesses, showing that the companies' owners deliberately allowed the sludge from the mines to runoff into the rivers. Donovan intends to sue the companies, but he is killed in a mysterious plane crash. Jeff is convinced that the coal mine owners sabotaged Donovan's plane in order to keep the evidence from leaking out.
