= Justice Gray (disambiguation) =

Justice Gray refers to Horace Gray, associate justice of the Massachusetts Supreme Judicial Court, and of the United States Supreme Court.

Justice Gray may also refer to:

- John Clinton Gray (1843–1915), judge of the New York Court of Appeals
- Karla M. Gray (1947–2017), chief justice of the Montana Supreme Court
- Peter W. Gray (1819–1874), associate justice of the Texas Supreme Court
- Hiram Gray (1801–1890), ex officio a judge of the New York Court of Appeals
- Pardon Gray (1737–1814), associate justice of the Rhode Island Supreme Court
