= Grey Mabhalani Bango =

Grey Mabhalani Bango (born Southern Rhodesia, now Zimbabwe), son of Luposwa Bango, was a trade-unionist and chief of the Kalanga people of Matopos. He is best known for guiding Joshua Nkomo, leader of the Zimbabwe African Peoples Union (ZAPU) through the shrines of the Matopos Hills (now Matobo National Park) during Nkomo’s legendary 1953 visit to Dula.

Joshua Nkomo wrote:

As the spirit of Zimbabwean nationalism came to the fore again in the early 1950s, I examined for myself the power of the traditional faith of my people and visited the shrine where Mwali resides in the Matopos Hills. Well before dawn, at about 3am, William Sivako and Grey Mabhalani Bango, the nephew of the chief of my father’s village, accompanied me to the place called Dula.

According to legend, Nkomo heard a voice from the shrine addressing him and his guides by name, and asking them what they wanted.

Nkomo replied that he had come "to ask you to give this land back to your children, the people of the land." The voice replied: "Yes, my children. I will give you back your land. It will be after thirty years and it will be after a big war in which many will die... But you, son of Nyangolo, great-son of Maweme, you will lead this nation."... Narratives of Nkomo’s visit to Dula, which came to be widely distributed in Matabeleland, bestowed a sacred legitimacy on his leadership.

Grey Bango is the father of DJ, journalist and radio programmer Robert Dumakude Bango, who escaped the then unrecognised state of Rhodesia to London in 1974.
