= Gray (given name) =

Gray is a given name.

== People with the given name ==
- Gray (singer) (born 1986), South Korean hip hop recording artist and record producer
- Gray Davis, former Governor of California
- Gray Dorsey, American law professor
- Gray Gaulding, American racing driver
- Grey DeLisle, American voice actress and singer-songwriter
- Gray Newell, American racing driver
- Gray Silver (1870–1935), American politician and farmer from West Virginia

== Fictional characters ==
- Gray, a DARPA operative in James Rollins's Sigma Force novels
- Gray Fullbuster, a character in the manga series Fairy Tail
- Gray Harkness, a character in the TV programme Torchwood

== See also ==
- Gray (surname)
