= Demi Lovato: Dancing with the Devil =

2021 documentary series

- Genre: Documentary
- Directed by: Michael D. Ratner
- Starring: Demi Lovato; Madison De La Garza; Sirah; Dallas Lovato; Matthew Scott Montgomery; Dianna De La Garza; Eddie De La Garza
- Opening theme: "Dancing with the Devil" by Demi Lovato
- Country of origin: United States
- Original language: English
- No. of episodes: 4

Production
- Executive producers: Demi Lovato; Scooter Braun; Allison Kaye; Scott Manson; Michael D. Ratner; Miranda Sherman; Andy Mininger; Kfir Goldberg
- Producer: Marc Ambrose
- Cinematography: Michael Dwyer
- Editor: Paul Little
- Running time: 21-28 minutes
- Production companies: SB Films; OBB Pictures

Original release
- Network: YouTube Premium
- Release: March 23 – April 6, 2021

Demi Lovato: Dancing with the Devil is a 2021 documentary series about the life and career of American singer, songwriter, and actor Demi Lovato. Released in four parts on YouTube from March 23 to April 6, 2021, the series covers a range of topics including Lovato's near-fatal overdose in 2018. It serves as a companion piece to Lovato's seventh studio album Dancing with the Devil... the Art of Starting Over. The documentary is titled after Lovato's song "Dancing with the Devil", which serves as the album's third single.

== Background ==
The series was announced by YouTube in June 2020 during the COVID-19 pandemic, saying that it would "showcase the singer's personal and professional journey over the last three years". Michael D. Ratner was announced as director the same day. The series, which is made up of four parts, is a follow-up to Lovato's 2017 YouTube Originals documentary, Demi Lovato: Simply Complicated. In January 2021, Lovato shared the title of the series in a social media post, exclaiming that "there has been so much that I've wanted to say" and she felt that this was the right way of doing so. Lovato stated that she wanted to "set the record straight" with the series and shed light on the overdose and what led to it. She also shared a desire to help others who are dealing with similar struggles and keep themself accountable moving forward, something she found to be helpful during the 6 years of sobriety which they maintained before 2018. Lovato also said she experienced tremendous "growth" during her experiences, and was fundamentally eager to share that with others.

Before the series' release, Lovato confirmed that not every topic will revolve around her substance abuse and that the documentary goes beyond just her relapse and recovery, into previously unspoken traumas of their past as well as the music industry.

== Cast ==
- Demi Lovato
- Dianna De La Garza, mother
- Eddie De La Garza, stepfather
- Madison De La Garza, sister
- Dallas Lovato, sister
- Matthew Scott Montgomery, best friend
- Sirah, best friend and former sober companion
- Jordan Jackson, former assistant
- Scooter Braun, manager
- Max Lea, head of security and chief of staff
- Dani Vitale, former choreographer and creative director
- Glenn Nordlinger, business manager
- Charles Cook, case manager
- Dr. Shouri Lahiri, neurologist
- Elton John
- Christina Aguilera
- Will Ferrell

Additionally, the archive footages used in the documentary feature record producer DJ Khaled, singer Kehlani, newscasters Robin Roberts, George Stephanopoulos, Lester Holt, and stylist Law Roach.

== Production ==
Demi Lovato: Dancing with the Devil is directed, produced and executive produced by Michael D. Ratner, executive produced by Lovato herself and Braun, Allison Kaye, Scott Manson for SB Projects, and Scott Ratner, Kfir Goldberg, and Miranda Shannon for OBB Pictures. Marc Ambrose served as producer, and Andy Mininger, Arlen Konopaki, Jen McDaniels, Scott Marcus, James Shin and Hannah Lux Davis served as co-executive producers.

== Episodes ==
No.	Title	Directed by	Original release date
1	"Losing Control"	Michael D. Ratner	March 23, 2021
Demi and her family and friends candidly open up for the first time about what led to her near-fatal overdose.
2	"5 Minutes from Death"	Michael D. Ratner	March 23, 2021
Demi and her closest confidants give a firsthand account of the aftermath of the overdose as she woke up in the hospital after being minutes away from death.
3	"Reclaiming Power"	Michael D. Ratner	March 30, 2021
Demi goes to rehab and begins her road to recovery but faces challenges along the way. As she returns to the stage for the first time since her overdose, she needs to find balance in her life.
4	"Rebirthing"	Michael D. Ratner	April 6, 2021
In the conclusion to her documentary, Demi discusses her upcoming album, her canceled engagement, and her attempts at moderation with her sobriety.

== Release ==
Similarly to Simply Complicated, the documentary features interviews with friends and family speaking of Lovato's near-fatal 2018 overdose and the health scares she experienced from the event. Elton John and Christina Aguilera also appear.

Dancing with the Devil debuted as the opening night headliner at the South by Southwest (SXSW) Film Festival on March 16, 2021 and the first two episodes were released on YouTube on March 23, 2021. The last two episodes premiered March 30 and April 6, respectively.

== Critical reception ==
The docs series received positive reviews. The review aggregator website Rotten Tomatoes reported an 85% approval rating with an average rating of 7/10 based on 34 reviews. The website's critical consensus reads: "Harrowing and heartfelt, Dancing with the Devil at times trips over itself, but there's no denying the power of Demi Lovato's candid courage in facing their demons." On Metacritic, the film received a weighted average score of 73 out of 100 based on nine reviews. Lea Palmieri of Decider gave the series a positive review, writing that Dancing with the Devil is "raw and heartbreaking and challenging to watch — which makes it all the more imperative that people do hear Lovato's harrowing story."

The Guardian writer Alim Kheraj gave the series four out of five, commenting that Dancing with the Devil explores the devastating consequences of living under the restraints of being a child star, and that "if the point of music documentaries is to humanize her subject, then Demi Lovato: Dancing With the Devil should become the blueprint." Daniel D'Addario from Variety praised Lovato for her "outright shocking bluntness" and powerfulness throughout the series. In a mixed review, Inkoo King of The Hollywood Reporter praised Lovato's brutal honesty throughout the series, but felt that at times the "honesty is sometimes undermined aesthetically by production choices ... at other times, Lovato's openness is underserved by Ratner's preference for momentum over proper contextualization".

Rating the series a C-grade, The Playlist critic Robert Daniels complimented Lovato for courageously attempting to reclaim her agency but criticized the series for "falling into the same cycle of manicured myth-building [Lovato] had hoped to leave behind". Scoring the series two out of five, Dewey Singleton of AwardsWatch stated that "the film comes off as more of a PR move than any deep dive into addressing their inner demons".
