= Grey (company) =

American financial technology company

- Former name: Aboki Africa
- Founded: 2020; 6 years ago
- Headquarters: Delaware, United States
- Area served: Europe; US; Africa; Latin America; South-East Asia
- Founders: Idorenyin Obong; Femi Aghedo
- Industry: Financial Services
- Services: Foreign Exchange; Remittance
- Website: grey.co

Grey, formerly known as Aboki Africa, is a financial technology company headquartered in Delaware, US. Founded in 2020 by Idorenyin Obong and Femi Aghedo during the global pandemic of 2020, the company focuses on creating global financial products for digital nomads. Grey is registered and licensed in Canada by FinTrac and the USA by FinCen and operates in the financial service market. The business model of Grey revolves around offering an online platform that facilitates international transactions and currency exchange for users in countries across Africa, the United States, Europe, and now Latin America and South East Asia.

== History ==
Grey was founded as Aboki Africa in July 2020.

In 2022, the company rebranded from Aboki Africa to Grey and was accepted into Y Combinator's Winter Batch Accelerator Program (YC W22) after completing a pre-seed funding round led by Ingressive Capital. A move which marked a key step in its early growth, helping the company gain visibility and financial backing to drive expansion

In 2022, the company raised $2 million in a seed funding round, enabling Grey's services to expand across Kenya and in other regions in East Africa. By November 2023, Grey had reached 500,000 users, and by August 2024, its user base had grown to over 1 million.

In 2022, Grey partnered with pan-African payments company, Cellulant to provide foreign bank accounts, instant currency exchange, and international money transfers to Kenyans. Cellulant acts as the payment processor to facilitate payouts to local bank accounts and mobile money platforms like M-Pesa

By 2024, the company had expanded its services into more regions, entering the Latin American (LATAM) and Southeast Asian (SEA) markets. As part of this expansion, the company introduced additional payout options in over 80 countries, including the ability to send USD Coin (USDC) via Ethereum and TRON networks. As of 2024, Grey had raised $2 million in seed funding over two rounds from ten investors including Y Combinator, Samvit Ramadurgam, Soma Capital, Alan Rutledge, Heirloom Investment Management, True Culture Fund, and Karthik Ramakrishnan

== East African expansion ==
In 2022, Grey expanded its operations into East Africa by establishing a regional hub in Kenya. The expansion followed the company's growth in West Africa, where it had already built a substantial user base in countries like Nigeria and Ghana. Kenya was chosen as the hub for East Africa due to its strong remittance inflows, which reached $4 billion in 2022 and accounted for more than 3% of the country's GDP.

Grey's services in Kenya include virtual foreign bank accounts in major currencies (USD, GBP, and EUR), which allow users to receive international payments and convert them into local currencies, such as the Kenyan Shilling. The service is tailored for freelancers, remote workers, and small businesses that rely on cross-border payments.

As of 2024, the company gained 300,000 users in the region and announced plans to expand into neighboring markets like Uganda and Rwanda.

== Latin America and Southeast Asia ==
In July 2024, Grey extended its cross-border financial services beyond Africa and expanded its operations into Latin America (LATAM) and Southeast Asia (SEA). In LATAM, Grey focused on markets such as Brazil and Mexico, where a significant portion of the population remains unbanked.

In Southeast Asia, Grey entered key markets like Indonesia and the Philippines, where remittance inflows and the gig economy play a crucial role in the economy. In LATAM and SEA, Grey introduced USD Coin (USDC) payouts, for sending USDC to external wallet addresses via Ethereum or TRON networks.

== See also ==
- Wise (Formerly TransferWise)
- Flutterwave
- Payoneer
- Cross-border payments
- Digital banking
