= Dancing with the Devil (song) =

2021 single by Demi Lovato

Single by Demi Lovato

from the album Dancing with the Devil... the Art of Starting Over
- Released: March 26, 2021
- Studio: Westlake Recording Studios (Los Angeles, CA); The Hollywood Compound (Los Angeles, CA); The Sonic Church (Brentwood, TN)
- Length: 4:04; 3:08 (radio edit)
- Label: Island; Republic
- Songwriters: Demi Lovato; Mitch Allan; Bianca "Blush" Atterberry; John Ho
- Producer: Mitch Allan

Demi Lovato singles chronology
"What Other People Say" (2021)	"Dancing with the Devil" (2021)	"Met Him Last Night" (2021)

Music video
- "Dancing with the Devil" on YouTube

"Dancing with the Devil" is a song by American singer Demi Lovato. It was released on March 26, 2021 by Island Records as the third single from Lovato's seventh studio album Dancing with the Devil... the Art of Starting Over. The singer co-wrote the song with Bianca Atterberry, John Ho, and its producer Mitch Allan. The song debuted and peaked at number 56 on the Billboard Hot 100 and reached the top 50 in the UK and the Billboard Global 200 and number 7 in Hungary.

== Background and composition ==
"Dancing with the Devil" was featured in the trailer for Lovato's 2021 documentary Demi Lovato: Dancing with the Devil and is the second track from the album Dancing with the Devil... the Art of Starting Over. Set in the key of C minor, the vocal range spans nearly three octaves, from E♭_{3} to B♭_{5}.

The song begins with currently recovered Lovato chronicling a 2018 substance dependency relapse, which would lead to a near-fatal overdose later that same year. The opening verses describe the relapse's initial phase, which was primarily with red wine: "It's just a little red wine, I'll be fine/ Not like I wanna do this every night/ I've been good, don't I deserve it? I think I've earned it/ Feels like it's worth it in my mind." The second verse describes an introduction to heavier drugs: "A little white line" that eventually became "a little glass pipe."

Ultimately, Lovato becomes addicted to smoking heroin, singing "Tinfoil remedy almost got the best of me," and confessing in the pre-chorus that during this time, "I told you I was OK, but I was lying." The track's chorus, "almost made it to heaven" by "playing with the enemy / gambling with my soul", refers to a past overdose. Lovato also sings about the grip that addiction had and the psychological difficulty it imposed, repeating throughout the song "It's so hard to say no / When you're dancing with the devil".

== Lyric video ==
A lyric video was released with various visually muddled graphics, including imagery of an ocean, flames of a fire, and butterflies.

== Music video ==
The video for "Dancing with the Devil" is a detailed re-creation of the events involved in Lovato's 2018 drug overdose, sexual assault, and harrowing near-death experience, as well as the aftermath in the hospital the days after. The music video is a re-enactment, and includes the green jacket worn that night with scenes of substance abuse at a party, followed by proceeding home and unzipping of the drug dealer's duffel bag in Lovato's bedroom, and later the drug dealer looming ominously over the singer's unconscious and unclothed body, presumably after a sexual assault. The paramedics are then shown reviving and transporting Lovato to the hospital, where a neck tube is sewn in, in order to pump out blood, clean it, and pump it back in. This is followed by scenes of family and friends shuddering at the hospital during the first post-overdose day, when survival was in doubt. Finally Lovato wakes up, and is given a sponge bath by a nurse, which reveals a "survivor" tattoo near where the neck blood tube used to be.

== Critical reception ==
Prior to its release, "Dancing with the Devil" was described by Shana Naomi Krochmal of Entertainment Weekly as "evok[ing] Adele's "Skyfall" theme". Billboard described the song as "powerful" and "confessional". Rob Harvilla of The Ringer, describes the song as "an expert slow-burn barrage of Bond Movie Theme extravagant melodrama."

== Credits and personnel ==
Recording and management

- Recorded at Westlake Recording Studios, The Hollywood Compound (Los Angeles, California), The Sonic Church (Brentwood, Tennessee)
- Mixed at MixStar Studios (Virginia Beach, Virginia)
- Mastered at Sterling Sound Studios (Edgewater, New Jersey)
- Published by DDLovato Music/Universal Music Corp. (ASCAP), Seven Summits Music obo itself and High Rise Life Publishing (BMI), John Ho (ASCAP), Money Making Machine, I Just Can't Read Music (ASCAP) administered by Kobalt Songs Music Publishing (ASCAP)

Personnel

- Demi Lovato – lead vocals, composition
- Mitch Allan – composition, production, vocal production, programming, bass, keyboards, guitar, percussion
- John Ho – composition, co-production
- Bianca "Blush" Atterberry – composition, background vocals
- Andy Guerrero – engineering
- Caleb Hulin – engineering, programming, guitar
- Midi Jones – programming, keyboards, piano
- Kevin Kadish – piano engineering
- Serban Ghenea – mixing
- John Hanes – engineering
- Chris Gehringer – mastering

Credits adapted from the liner notes of Dancing with the Devil... the Art of Starting Over.

== Accolades ==
Year	Organization	Award	Result	Ref.
2021	MTV Europe Music Awards	Video for Good	Nominated	
2021	MTV Video Music Awards	Video for Good	Nominated	

== Charts ==
Chart performance for "Dancing with the Devil"
Chart (2021)	Peak position
Canada Hot 100 (Billboard)	49
Global 200 (Billboard)	50
Hungary (Single Top 40)	7
Ireland (IRMA)	46
New Zealand Hot Singles (RMNZ)	6
Portugal (AFP)	82
UK Singles (OCC)	50
US Billboard Hot 100	56
US Adult Pop Airplay (Billboard)	39

== Certifications ==
Certifications and sales for "Dancing with the Devil"
Region	Certification	Certified units/sales
Brazil (Pro-Música Brasil)	Platinum	40,000^{‡}
United States (RIAA)	Gold	500,000^{‡}
^{‡} Sales+streaming figures based on certification alone.

== Release history ==
Release history for "Dancing with the Devil"
Region	Date	Format	Label	Ref.
Various	March 26, 2021	Digital download; streaming	Island	
Italy	March 26, 2021	Contemporary hit radio	Universal	
United States	March 29, 2021	Hot adult contemporary radio	Island; Republic	
United States	March 30, 2021	Contemporary hit radio	Island; Republic	
