= Grey College =

Grey College can refer to:

- Grey College, Durham
- Grey College, Bloemfontein
