= Dancing with the Devil... the Art of Starting Over =

Studio album by Demi Lovato
- Released: April 2, 2021
- Recorded: February 2018 – February 2021
- Studios: Westlake (Hollywood, California); The Hollywood Compound (Los Angeles, California); The Sonic Church (Brentwood, Tennessee); SuCasa (Los Angeles); Dry Snack (Los Angeles); Sitwell (Toronto, Ontario); Facet House (West Hollywood, California); MXM (Los Angeles); MXM (Stockholm, Sweden); BLND (Sweden)
- Genre: Pop
- Length: 57:11
- Labels: Island; Republic
- Producers: Dayyon Alexander; Mitch Allan; Marcus Andersson; Lauren Aquilina; Tommy Brown; Eren Cannata; Philip "Phil the Keys" Cornish; Warren "Oak" Felder; Courageous Xavier Herrera; Jussifer; Matthew Koma; Pop & Oak; Ryan "Rykeyz" Williamson

Demi Lovato chronology
Tell Me You Love Me (2017)	Dancing with the Devil... the Art of Starting Over (2021)	Holy Fvck (2022)

Singles from Dancing with the Devil... the Art of Starting Over
- 1. "Anyone" Released: January 26, 2020; 2. "What Other People Say" Released: February 4, 2021; 3. "Dancing with the Devil" Released: March 26, 2021; 4. "Met Him Last Night" Released: April 13, 2021

Dancing with the Devil... the Art of Starting Over is the seventh studio album by American singer Demi Lovato. It was released on April 2, 2021, by Island Records, and was recorded alongside a docu-series by YouTube Originals, titled Demi Lovato: Dancing with the Devil, which documents her recovery and self-discovery. It follows a reformative period in the singer's life and career, after being hospitalized for a drug overdose in 2018. The lyrics of the album emphasize on Lovato's journey through her hurdles and self-empowerment.

Produced by a variety of collaborators, such as Mitch Allan, Lauren Aquilina, Tommy Brown, Oak Felder, Jussifer, Matthew Koma and Pop & Oak, the album is primarily a pop record with elements of pop rock, country pop, folk-pop, and R&B. Multiple versions of the album were made available to pre-order, including alternate artworks, bundles and a Target-exclusive edition with bonus tracks. Lovato released two additional versions of the album, with a deluxe version and an expanded edition that was released digitally including three previously released bonus tracks. It was also delayed in part due to the COVID-19 pandemic.

Dancing with the Devil... the Art of Starting Over was supported by the release of four singles: "Anyone", "What Other People Say", "Dancing with the Devil" and "Met Him Last Night". Noah Cyrus, Ariana Grande, Sam Fischer and Saweetie are featured on the album as vocal guests, while collaborations with Sam Smith and Marshmello are included on the digital expanded edition. The album has charted within the top 10 in Australia, Austria, Belgium, Canada, Ireland, the Netherlands, Norway, Portugal, Scotland, Spain, Switzerland, the United Kingdom, and the United States. It was nominated for a GLAAD Media Award in the Outstanding Music Artist category.

== Background and development ==
Following the release of Lovato's previous studio album Tell Me You Love Me (2017), she took a hiatus from her career following her 2018 hospitalization and subsequent treatment for a drug overdose. In May 2019, Lovato revealed she had signed with a new manager, Scooter Braun, and confirmed to Teen Vogue the following November that new music was coming, stating "I didn't say when — now I'm just teasing you. It's important to remember that I am so cautious this time around of jumping back into things. I've really decided to take my time with things. When the time is right, I will put it out there. I am dying to release new music ... but everything in due time." Lovato made her first musical appearance since her hiatus with a performance of single "Anyone" at the 62nd Annual Grammy Awards in January 2020. Throughout 2020, Lovato released further stand-alone solo singles "I Love Me" and "Still Have Me" and collaborations "I'm Ready" with Sam Smith and "OK Not to Be OK" with Marshmello. Lovato also released "Commander in Chief" as a political ballad ahead of the 2020 presidential election. Planned for release in 2020, Lovato's seventh studio album was postponed due to the COVID-19 pandemic.

Lovato's first music release of 2021 was the single "What Other People Say" in collaboration with Australian singer Sam Fischer. The release and title of Dancing with the Devil... the Art of Starting Over was subsequently announced on March 16, 2021. Lovato explained that the original title was just The Art of Starting Over, but she then decided to give it a double title to reflect the importance of "the darker opening songs" on the album. During a livestream on the audio-chat app Clubhouse, Lovato explained about the album, "If you listen to it track by track, if you follow the track listing, it's kind of actually like the non-official soundtrack to the documentary. Because it really does follow my life over the past couple of years. When we went through the track listing and kind of mapped out how it kind of coincided with my life's story, it made sense to add the more emotional stuff in the beginning and then transition into 'The Art of Starting Over'". Lovato also revealed three collaborations with female artists on the album: Noah Cyrus, Ariana Grande and Saweetie.

A promotional website was launched for the album, where its artwork and pre-save link was released on March 16, 2021. The album serves as a companion piece to Demi Lovato: Dancing with the Devil, a YouTube Originals docu series, which began release on March 23, 2021. Both projects focus on Lovato's near fatal 2018 overdose for the first time, while also exploring her life and path to healing in the time since.

== Singles ==
The album was supported by four singles. The lead single from the album, "Anyone", was released on January 26, 2020. The second single, "What Other People Say" with Sam Fischer, was released on February 4, 2021, and the third single, "Dancing with the Devil" was released on March 26, 2021. "Met Him Last Night" featuring Ariana Grande was serviced to US contemporary hit radio in the United States on April 13, 2021, as the album's fourth and last single.

== Artwork and versions ==
Multiple versions of the album were issued with different album covers including three variations for DTC versions of the album via Lovato's website, as well as a UK exclusive cover and another version for Target in the United States. The UK versions all feature an additional bonus track, while the Target version adds two bonus tracks in addition to the different album cover. Dancing with the Devil... the Art of Starting Over was also made available in a bundle featuring the three exclusive album covers along with either the UK-specific cover or the general standard edition cover. Multiple DTC cassette variations were made available for preorder via Lovato's website. All three alternate covers have their own cassette variations exclusive to the UK, while the American cassette release uses the standard edition cover art. The album artwork was shot by American photographer Dana Trippe.

== Composition ==
=== Music and lyrics ===
Primarily a pop record, Dancing with the Devil... the Art of Starting Over also includes pop rock, country pop, folk-pop and R&B elements. At the premiere event for the documentary, Lovato described the album as her "most cohesive project" ever made. Lovato described the songs as a mashup of genres, including R&B, country, and pop. Vulture references rock songs on the album, describing "Lonely People" and "Melon Cake" as "anthemic '80s pop-rock", while "The Art of Starting Over" and "The Kind of Lover I Am" are described as "yacht rock". "My Girlfriends Are My Boyfriend" and "Met Him Last Night" are described as having a contemporary R&B flair. Lastly, some songs on the album, such as "15 Minutes", "The Way You Don't Look At Me", and "What Other People Say" are described as "pop-country" and "folk-pop" with guitar-driven instrumentals and earnest oversharing. The first three tracks of Dancing with the Devil... the Art of Starting Over are listed as "Prelude", and consist of "power ballads chronicling Lovato's darkest days" before moving into her recovery.

=== Songs ===
The opening track and lead single "Anyone" was compared by Olivia Truffaut-Wong of Bustle with Lovato's 2011 single "Skyscraper", which was also deemed as her musical comeback following her stint at a treatment center in 2010 for issues with bulimia and self-harm. Bryan Rolli of Forbes opined the lyrics talk about the singer's "feelings of isolation and anguish", as exemplified in the chorus, "Anyone, please send me anyone / Lord, is there anyone? / I need someone". The second track and third single "Dancing with the Devil" was described by Billboard as "powerful" and "confessional". Entertainment Weekly opined that it "evokes Adele's "Skyfall" theme. The third track, "I.C.U." (Madison's Lullabye), is a "stark piano ballad" which "echoes a key scene in her documentary in which Lovato wakes up post-overdose, temporarily blind, and can't recognize her sister sitting at her bedside". Playing the song privately for her younger sister was "a really emotional and personal experience" for Lovato.

Following the spoken-word interlude "Intro", the fifth track "The Art of Starting Over" was compared by Entertainment Weekly to "early Stevie Nicks", with Lovato describing it as "the perfect driving song", while adding, "There's been so many times in my life where I've had to start over once again, whether I felt like I've hit rock bottom, or after a breakup. We can pull ourselves back up and keep fighting the good fight." The "guitar driven" Oak Felder-produced sixth track "Lonely People" was inspired by "a text from [Lovato] about how even if [she was] happier single, it could still be lonely", while the seventh track "The Way You Don't Look at Me" was described by Entertainment Weekly as a "standout track with a swirling, melodic hook" with Lovato singing, "I've lost 10 pounds in two weeks, 'cause I told me I shouldn't eat" and "I'm so scared if I undress that you won't love me after". Co-writer Justin Tranter stated that "it's this very intimate, raw, heartbreaking song, but there's this beauty to it, because of how it sounds and it feels, and Demi's vocal performance on that really destroys me". The eighth track "Melon Cake" contains lyrics referring to Lovato's struggles with eating disorders; described as "punchy" and a "plinky-plunky bop about the bad old days when Lovato struggled with pressure 'to make me Barbie-sized'". The Ariana Grande collaboration "Met Him Last Night" was referred to by NME as a "dark and atmospheric electro bop".

The tenth track and second single "What Other People Say" is a collaboration with Australian singer-songwriter Sam Fischer, and is about the "feeling of being alone and not wanting to let people down". Lovato said, "This song is a reflection on what it's like to lose who you truly are in an effort to please other people and society. It's why I wanted to make this song with Sam – ultimately it's about two humans coming together to connect and find solutions to their problems". Fischer described that the song as "about the pressures of society and how getting caught up with the wrong things can change you". Eleventh track "Carefully" "combines acoustic guitar and a Nineties electro-pulse" with the lyrics "approach with caution/ I can get overwhelming... Cause I'm strong in a way that I'm able to show my fragile". The twelfth track "The Kind of Lover I Am", a "lightly funky number", was compared with Harry Styles' 2019 single "Watermelon Sugar" and features the lyrics "Doesn't matter if you're a woman or a man, that's the kind of lover I am", with Lovato elaborating that "I'm a very fluid person when it comes to sexuality, so I wanted to write a song about that. That's something that I hadn't written about since 'Cool for the Summer'. But this isn't about bi-curiosity anymore. It's a part of who I am and I feel very secure in that". The "savagely upbeat" track "15 Minutes", features Lovato "neatly turn[ing] claims from her ex-fiancé that [she was] trading on her breakup for clout right back around" with the lyric "Good riddance — you got your 15 minutes".

"My Girlfriends Are My Boyfriend", featuring Saweetie, includes "Billie Eilish-esque close-mic'd vocals and staccato electronics". "California Sober" is a "strummy mid-tempo" which "explains where Lovato is at with her recovery today". "Butterfly" discusses "the complicated relationship" she had with her biological father, who died in 2013. "Good Place", the last track of the standard edition of the album, "makes further use of acoustic guitar balladry to celebrate her recovery".

== Critical reception ==
Professional ratings
Aggregate scores
Source	Rating
AnyDecentMusic?	6.8/10
Metacritic	73/100
Review scores
Source	Rating
AllMusic	3/5 stars
Consequence of Sound	B
The Daily Telegraph	5/5 stars
Evening Standard	3/5 stars
The Guardian	3/5 stars
The Independent	4/5 stars
The Line of Best Fit	7/10
NME	4/5 stars
Pitchfork	6.5/10
Rolling Stone	3/5 stars

Dancing with the Devil... the Art of Starting Over received generally positive reviews from music critics. At Metacritic, which assigns a normalized rating out of 100 to reviews from publications, the album received a weighted average score of 73, based on 13 reviews, indicating "generally favorable reviews".

In positive reviews, Robin Murray of Clash hailed Dancing with the Devil... the Art of Starting Over "an ambitious and hugely revealing journey into pop redemption", and praised the combination of darkness with lightness. He noted that the album, after the first three tracks, progresses into a more uplifting direction. Jeffrey Davies of PopMatters described the album as "Demi Lovato like we have never heard before". He added that the singer is "sassy and carefree" yet "serious about her identity and personhood" and praised the creative freedom on display. Awarding the album a perfect score, Neil McCormick of The Daily Telegraph lauded Dancing with the Devil... the Art of Starting Over, calling it "the perfect contemporary pop artefact" that mixes intimate ballads with upbeat club tracks, and admired the progression of its tracks. Nick Levine of NME wrote that the album is Lovato's "definitive artistic statement to date", further describing the record as "musically varied and lyrically unvarnished: an album of 'take me as I am' jams that to an extent", recalling Pink's 2001 album Missundaztood.

Dubbing it an album about "death that is full of life", Kate Solomon from i declared that Lovato had achieved a cohesiveness to the album not present on previous efforts, "by echoing the peaks and troughs of recovery, the moments of pure relief and joy at being alive elevating even the minor swings and misses". Helen Brown, writing for The Independent, stated that Lovato "embraces independence" on the album, through confessional themes, emotional authenticity and powerful delivery. Mark Richardson of The Wall Street Journal wrote that, while Lovato's previous album Tell Me You Love Me (2017) "found her embracing R&B and club-ready electronic pop", Dancing with the Devil... the Art of Starting Over "is much more subdued" and that it is "certainly a recovery narrative, but the details of her story, many of which make it into these songs, are almost unbearably harrowing." Reviewing for The Line of Best Fit, Rachel Saywitz remarked that there are more "gems than duds" on the album, in which Lovato experimented more than her previous releases, both musically and vocally.

A few reviews expressed mixed feelings. Alexis Petridis of The Guardian commented that the album is "simultaneously shocking, laudable" but thought it was "a little underwhelming". Evening Standard's David Smyth felt that Lovato "reaches too easily for cliches" in the album, as the "polished pop inhibits her power". Consequence of Sound critic Mary Siroky appreciated Lovato's vocals, but found the latter half of the record "forgettable". Questioning whether the album "is a work of art, an exhale, and a reclamation, rather than an opportunity to profit", Siroky asserted that it is powerful to see Lovato continue making music inspired by her bravery, however, "it would be nice to see a day when [she doesn't] have to be so brave anymore and can instead create joyfully and freely". Rolling Stone's Keith Harris concluded that Dancing with the Devil... The Art of Starting Over "delivers" what it suggests in the first half of its title, while skimping on the second half. He explained that Lovato's hurdles are efficiently portrayed in the album, but is unclear "how [she wants] to begin again." Chris Willman of Variety complimented Lovato's vocals, though was concerned over the "overtly autobiographical" numbers, some of which are "pretty good" while few others are "not-so-hot", resulting in an "unevenness". He picked "The Way You Don't Look at Me", "Melon Cake" and "California Sober" as the highlights and dismissed the Ariana Grande and Saweetie collaborations as letdowns.

In June 2021, during Pride Month, Billboard included the album among the 15 best albums by LGBTQ artists of 2021 so far, remarking that Lovato "finds [her breath] again in the album that showcases [her] most confessional songwriting to date".

== Commercial performance ==
In the United States, Dancing with the Devil... the Art of Starting Over opened at number two on the Billboard 200 with 74,000 album-equivalent units, of which 38,000 were pure album sales making it the highest-selling album of that week and her seventh in a row to reach the country's top five. The album also debuted at number two on the UK Albums Chart with sales of 20,183 album-equivalent units (of which 2,849 were streaming sales), becoming Lovato's highest-charting album in the country. In Australia, it entered at number 8 on the ARIA Albums Chart and is her third album to reach the nation's top 10 after Confident and Tell Me You Love Me. Overall the album has peaked in the top 10 in 13 countries.

== Track listing ==
Standard edition
No.	Title	Writer(s)	Producer(s)	Length
1.	"Anyone"	Demi Lovato; Badriia "Bibi" Bourelly; Eyelar Mirzazadeh; Jay Mooncie; Sam Roman; Dayyon Alexander	Romans; Jay Mooncie; Dayyon Alexander^{[b]}	3:47
2.	"Dancing with the Devil"	Lovato; Bianca Atterberry; Mitch Allan; John Ho	Allan^{[a]}; Ho^{[c]}	4:03
3.	"ICU (Madison's Lullabye)"	Lovato; Atterberry; Philip Cornish	Phil the Keys; Allan^{[b]}	3:16
4.	"Intro"	Lovato		0:26
5.	"The Art of Starting Over"	Lovato; Caroline Pennell; Warren "Oak" Felder; Trevor David Brown; William Zaire Simmons	Oak^{[a]}; "Downtown" Trevor Brown^{[c]}; Zaire Koalo^{[c]}	2:47
6.	"Lonely People"	Lovato; Felder; Pennell; Justin Tranter; Brown; Simmons; Billy Walsh	Oak^{[a]}; "Downtown" Trevor Brown^{[c]}; Zaire Koalo^{[c]}	2:40
7.	"The Way You Don't Look at Me"	Lovato; Tranter; Eren Cannata; Julia Michaels; Jussi Karvinen; Pennell	Jussifer; Eren Cannata; Allan^{[b]}	2:28
8.	"Melon Cake"	Lovato; Michaels; Tranter; Cannata	Cannata; Oak^{[b]}	3:32
9.	"Met Him Last Night" (featuring Ariana Grande)	Grande; Albert Stanaj; Tommy Brown; Courageous Xavier Herrera	Tommy Brown; Xavi; Allan^{[b]}	3:24
10.	"What Other People Say" (with Sam Fischer)	Lovato; Ryan Williamson; Fischer; Geoff Warburton	Rykeyz^{[a]}; Allan^{[b]}	3:14
11.	"Carefully"	Marcus Andersson; Pennell; Lauren Aquilina	Aquilina; Andersson; Allan^{[b]}	3:11
12.	"The Kind of Lover I Am"	Lovato; Michaels; Pennell; Tranter; Felder; Brown; Simmons	Oak^{[a]}; "Downtown" Trevor Brown^{[c]}; Zaire Koalo^{[c]}	3:09
13.	"Easy" (with Noah Cyrus)	Matthew Koma; Taylor Goldsmith; Madison Love; Simon Wilcox	Matthew Koma^{[a]}; Bart Schoudel^{[b]}	3:28
14.	"15 Minutes"	Lovato; Tranter; Atterberry; Felder; Brown; Gregory Aldea Hein	Oak^{[a]}; "Downtown" Trevor Brown^{[c]}; Zaire Koalo^{[c]}	2:51
15.	"My Girlfriends Are My Boyfriend" (featuring Saweetie)	Lovato; Felder; Andrew Wansel; Diamonté Harper; Love; Michael Pollack	Pop & Oak; Oak^{[b]}	3:07
16.	"California Sober"	Lovato; Felder; Alex Niceforo; Keith Sorrells; Andersson; Sam Homaee; Pennell; Aquilina	Oak^{[a]}; Alex Nice^{[c]}; The Roommates^{[c]}; Sorrells^{[c]}	3:05
17.	"Mad World"	Roland Orzabal	Allan^{[a]}	3:02
18.	"Butterfly"	Andersson; Pennell; Aquilina	Aquilina; Andersson; Allan^{[b]}	2:37
19.	"Good Place"	Lovato; Cannata; Michaels; Tranter	Cannata; Oak^{[b]}	3:04
Total length:				57:11

Digital expanded edition
No.	Title	Writer(s)	Producer(s)	Length
20.	"I Love Me"	Lovato; Anne-Marie Nicholson; Jennifer Decilveo; Niceforo; Sean Douglas; Sorrells; Felder	Alex Nice; Sorrells; Felder	3:24
21.	"I'm Ready" (with Sam Smith)	Smith; Lovato; Ilya Salmanzadeh; Savan Kotecha; Peter Svensson	Ilya	3:20
22.	"OK Not to Be OK" (with Marshmello)	Lovato; Gregory Hein; James Gutch; James Nicholas Bailey; Christopher Comstock	Marshmello	2:39
Total length:				66:34

Digital deluxe edition
No.	Title	Writer(s)	Producer(s)	Length
20.	"Sunset"	Lovato; Atterberry; Pollack; Brown; Simmons	"Downtown" Trevor Brown; Kaolo; Pollack	4:04
21.	"Anyone" (live acoustic)	Lovato; Bourelly; Mirzazadeh; Mooncie; Roman; Alexander	Roman; Mooncie; Alexander; D'Elia^{[b]}	3:42
22.	"Dancing with the Devil" (live acoustic)	Lovato; Atterberry; Allan; Ho	Allan^{[a]}; Ho^{[c]}	4:10
23.	"ICU (Madison's Lullabye)" (live acoustic)	Lovato; Atterberry; Cornish	Phil the Keys; Allan^{[b]}	3:29
Total length:				72:00

Limited CD edition
No.	Title	Writer(s)	Producer(s)	Length
20.	"Gray"	Lovato; Caroline Ailin; Tranter; Simmons; Felder; Brown	Oak; Downtown^{[c]}; Koalo^{[c]}	3:11
Total length:				60:22

Target CD/LP and international CD special edition
No.	Title	Writer(s)	Producer(s)	Length
20.	"I'm Sorry"	Lovato; Chloe Angelides; Ryan Vojtesak; Love	Charlie Handsome; Allan^{[b]}	3:37
21.	"Change You"	Lovato; Trey Campbell; Angelides; Michael Woods; Kevin White	Rice N' Peas; Allan^{[b]}	3:09
Total length:				63:57

=== Notes ===
- On CD editions of the album, tracks 1–3 are listed under a subtitle of Prelude, whereas tracks 4–19 are listed under the subtitle The Art of Starting Over.
- "Mad World" is a cover of the song of the same name, as written by Roland Orzabal and originally performed by Tears for Fears.
- ^{^[a]} denotes producer and vocal producer.
- ^{^[b]} denotes vocal producer only.
- ^{^[c]} denotes a co-producer.

== Personnel ==
Credits were adapted from the liner notes of the alternate cover and UK release edition.

=== Performers and musicians ===
- Demi Lovato – lead vocals, spoken word (3–4, 12), background vocals (6)
- Ariana Grande – featured artist (9)
- Sam Fischer – featured artist (10), background vocals (10)
- Noah Cyrus – featured artist (13)
- Saweetie – featured artist (15)
- Dayyon Alexander – keys (1), programming (1)
- Mitch Allan – programming (2, 17), bass (2, 17), keyboards (2), guitar (2, 17), percussion (2, 17)
- Marcus Andersson – guitars (11, 18), bass (11), drum programming (11, 18), synth programming (11, 18), background vocals (11)
- David Angell – violins (10)
- Monisa Angell – viola (10)
- Bianca "Blush" Atterberry – background vocals (2)
- Lauren Aquilina – string programming (11), horn programming (11), synth programming (11, 18), background vocals (11)
- "Downtown" Trevor Brown – guitar (5–6, 12, 14, 20), bass (5, 12, 14, 20), keys (6, 14, 20), background vocals (6, 12), vocal samples (14, 20)
- Alex Brumel – pedal steel guitar (7)
- Erin Cafferky – background vocals (10)
- Eren Cannata – guitar (7–8, 19), keyboards (7–8, 19), drum programming (7–8), bass (8), programming (19)
- Philip "Phil the Keys" Cornish – piano (3)
- Peter Lee Johnson – strings (9)
- Jane Darnall – violins (10)
- David Davidson – violins (10)
- Madison De La Garza – spoken word (3)
- Ayanna Elese – background vocals (10)
- Conni Ellisor – violins (10)
- Steve Epting – background vocals (10)
- Warren "Oak" Felder – keys (5–6, 8, 12, 14–16, 20), bass (6, 14–16, 20), drum programming (6, 15–16), background vocals (6, 12, 20), drums (8)
- Kaye Fox – background vocals (10)
- Griffin Goldsmith – bass (13), drums (13)
- Caleb Hulin – programming (2), guitar (2)
- Alexis James – background vocals (10)
- Midi Jones – programming (2), keyboards (2), piano (2)
- Jussifer – bass (7), guitar (7), keyboards (7)
- Elizabeth Lamb – viola (10)
- Madison Love – background vocals (15)
- Matthew Koma – piano (13), synths (13)
- Pat McManus – guitar (10)
- Craig Nelson – bass (10)
- Alex Nice – keys (8, 16), guitars (16), strings (16)
- Caroline Pennell – background vocals (5–6, 11–12)
- Pop & Oak – instrumentation (15), programming (15)
- Carol Rabinowitz – cello (10)
- Sari Reist – cello (10)
- Rykeyz – programming (10), drums (10), bass (10), keyboards (10), percussion (10), string orchestration (10), background vocals (10)
- Louis Schoorl – piano (17)
- Keith Sorrells – guitar (8, 16), drum programming (8, 16), bass (16)
- Vegaz Taelor – background vocals (10)
- Cynthia Tolson – violin (13), viola (13), cello (13)
- Justin Tranter – background vocals (6, 12)
- Andrew "Pop" Wansel – drum programming (15)
- Desiree "DeSz" Washington – background vocals (10)
- Chelsea "Peaches" West – background vocals (10)
- Karen Winkelmann – violins (10)
- Zaire Koalo – drum programming (5–6), background vocals (6, 12), drums (12, 14, 20)

=== Production ===
- Demi Lovato – executive production
- Dayyon Alexander – production (1)
- Mitch Allan – production (2, 17), vocal production (2–3, 7, 9–11, 17–18), mixing (3, 17), recording (4)
- Marcus Andersson – production (11, 18)
- Lauren Aquilina – production (11, 18)
- Scooter Braun – executive production
- Aaron Brohman – assistant mix engineering (3, 17)
- Tommy Brown – production (9)
- "Downtown" Trevor Brown – co-production (5–6, 12, 14, 20)
- Eren Cannata – production (7–8, 19), recording (7, 19)
- Brian Cruz – engineering (3)
- Lauren D'Elia – vocal production (1), engineering (1), mixing (1)
- DJ Riggins – mixing assistant (15)
- Ryan Dulude – recording (10)
- Chris Gehringer – mastering (2–3, 5–16, 18–20)
- Serban Ghenea – mixing (2, 7, 9, 11)
- Josh Gudwin – mixing (10)
- Andy Guerrero – engineering (2)
- John Hanes – engineering for mix (2, 7, 9, 11)
- Courageous Xavier "Xavi" Herrera – production (9)
- Billy Hickey – recording (9)
- Caleb Hulin – engineering (2, 7, 11, 17–18)
- John Ho – co-production (2)
- Ryan Hommel – string arrangement (13)
- Eric J – mixing (8, 12, 20)
- Jaycen Joshua – mixing (15)
- Jussifer – production (7)
- Kevin Kadish – piano engineering (2)
- Dave Kutch – mastering (1)
- Manny Marroquin – mixing (5–6)
- Matthew Koma – production (13), vocal production (13), string arrangement (13)
- Brodie Means – engineering (3)
- Alex Nice – co-production (16)
- Oak – production (5–6, 12, 14, 16, 20), vocal production (5–6, 8, 12, 14–16, 19–20), recording (5–6, 8, 12, 14–15, 20)
- Phil the Keys – production (3)
- Pop & Oak – production (15)
- Jacob Richards – mixing assistant (15)
- Scott Robinson – recording (10)
- Rykeyz – production (10)
- Mike Seaberg – mixing assistant (15)
- Bart Schoudel – Noah Cyrus vocal production (13), engineering (13)
- Keith "Ten4" Sorrells – co-production (16)
- Mark "Spike" Stent – mixing (13–14, 16, 18–19)
- Cynthia Tolson – string arrangement (13)
- Heidi Wang – mixing assistant (10)
- Zaire Koalo – co-production (5–6, 12, 14, 20)

=== Artwork and creative ===
- Paul Lane – package production
- Ashley Pawlak – art direction, design
- Dana Trippe – photography, artwork

== Charts ==
Weekly chart performance
Chart (2021)	Peak position
Australian Albums (ARIA)	8
Austrian Albums (Ö3 Austria)	8
Belgian Albums (Ultratop Flanders)	5
Belgian Albums (Ultratop Wallonia)	14
Canadian Albums (Billboard)	6
Czech Albums (ČNS IFPI)	23
Dutch Albums (Album Top 100)	4
French Albums (SNEP)	56
German Albums (Offizielle Top 100)	12
Hungarian Albums (MAHASZ)	26
Irish Albums (Official Charts)	8
Italian Albums (FIMI)	36
Lithuanian Albums (AGATA)	46
New Zealand Albums (RMNZ)	12
Norwegian Albums (VG-lista)	4
Polish Albums (ZPAV)	28
Portuguese Albums (AFP)	3
Scottish Albums (Official Charts)	2
Slovak Albums (ČNS IFPI)	19
Spanish Albums (Promusicae)	9
Swiss Albums (Schweizer Hitparade)	7
UK Albums (Official Charts)	2
US Billboard 200	2

== Certifications ==
List of certifications and sales
Region	Certification	Certified units/sales
New Zealand (RMNZ)	Gold	7,500^{‡}
United Kingdom (BPI)	Silver	60,000^{‡}
^{‡} Sales+streaming figures based on certification alone.

== Release history ==
List of release dates and formats
Region	Date	Format(s)	Label	Edition(s)	Ref.
Various	April 2, 2021	Cassette; CD; digital download; streaming	Island	Standard; expanded; Target; UK	
Various	April 5, 2021	Digital download	Island	Deluxe	
