= Grey Island (Western Australia) =

Island in Western Australia

Grey Island (15°03′38″S 124°57′11″E) is located off the Kimberley coast of Western Australia.
