= Gray Peak =

Gray Peak may refer to:

- Gray Peak (California), Yosemite National Park, California, USA
- Gray Peak (New York), Adirondacks, New York, USA
- Gray Peak (Washington), North Cascades, Washington, USA
- Gray Peak (Wyoming), Gallatin Range, Wyoming, USA
- Gray Peak (Yukon), Big Salmon Range, Yukon, Canada
- Gray Peak (Antarctica), Queen Maud Mountains, Antarctica

== See also ==
- Grays Peak (British Columbia), Kokanee Glacier Park, British Columbia, Canada
- Grays Peak, Rocky Mountains, Colorado, USA
- Greys Peak, East Humboldt Range, Nevada, USA
- Grey Peaks National Park, Queensland, Australia
- Grauspitz, the highest peak in Liechtenstein
