= List of songs recorded by Selena Gomez =

Songs by American singer and actress

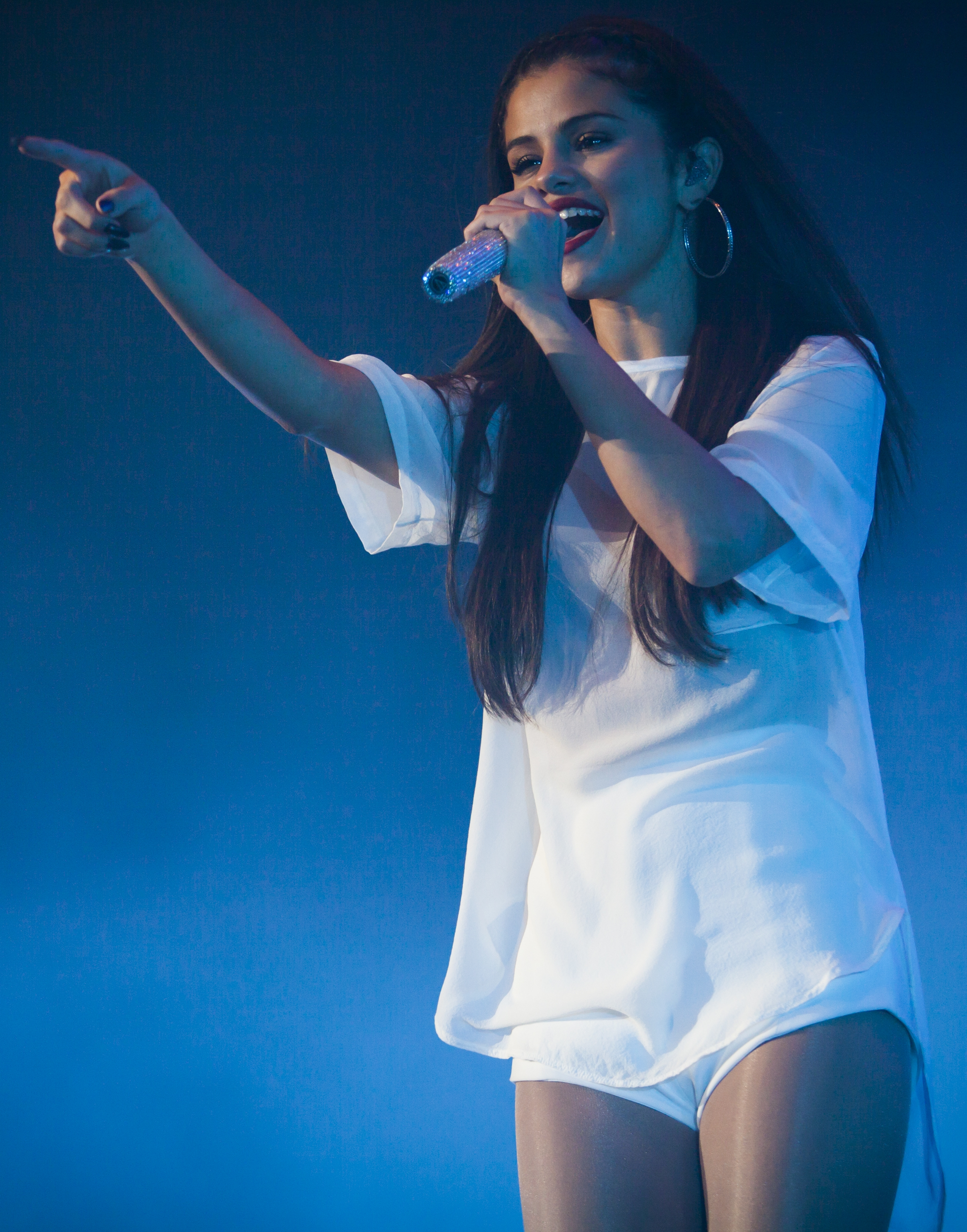
Gomez during her Stars Dance Tour in 2013.

Selena Gomez is an American singer, songwriter, and actress. In 2008, Gomez signed a record deal with Hollywood Records. Gomez later formed a band named Selena Gomez & the Scene. In 2008, Gomez released her first extended play (EP), Another Cinderella Story, by Razor & Tie. Selena Gomez & the Scene released their debut album, Kiss & Tell in 2009. Their second album, A Year Without Rain was released in 2010 and their third album, When the Sun Goes Down, in 2011. Gomez announced the band would take a hiatus while Gomez focused on her acting career. In 2013, she confirmed that she would be releasing her solo debut album, as opposed to another album with her band. The result was Stars Dance, released on July 19, 2013. Stars Dance is an album rooted stylistically in EDM and pop, this later specifically showcased as electropop.

Having spent seven years with Hollywood Records, Gomez signed a recording contract with Interscope Records in 2014. To officially end her contract with Hollywood Records, Gomez released the compilation album For You (2014). Her second studio album, Revival was released on October 9, 2015. Revival is primarily a dance-pop and electropop album with R&B vibes, which has been also described as "a heady mix of electronic dance music pop". The album was met with a positive reaction from critics, who praised the album's production and lyrical content. Her third studio album, Rare was released on January 10, 2020. Rare is a dance-pop record, it incorporates elements of R&B and electronic music. Lyrically, the album explores themes of self-love, self-empowerment, self-acceptance, and self-worth. Gomez released her first Spanish-language project, an extended play titled Revelación on March 12, 2021. The album blends reggaeton and latin pop with urbano elements, the project marked a stylistic departure from the dance-pop sound of Rare. The EP became her best-reviewed project on Metacritic.

Gomez and Benny Blanco released the collaborative album, I Said I Love You First on March 21, 2025. The album is a pop, alt-pop and bedroom pop record, it incorporates elements of synth-pop, pop rock and latin pop.

== Songs ==
Key
†	Indicates single release

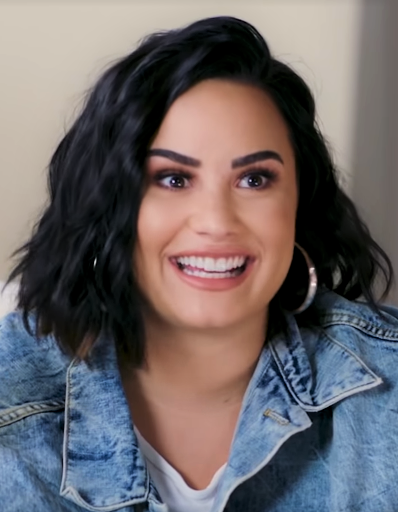
Demi Lovato collaborated with Gomez on "One and the Same" and "Send It On".

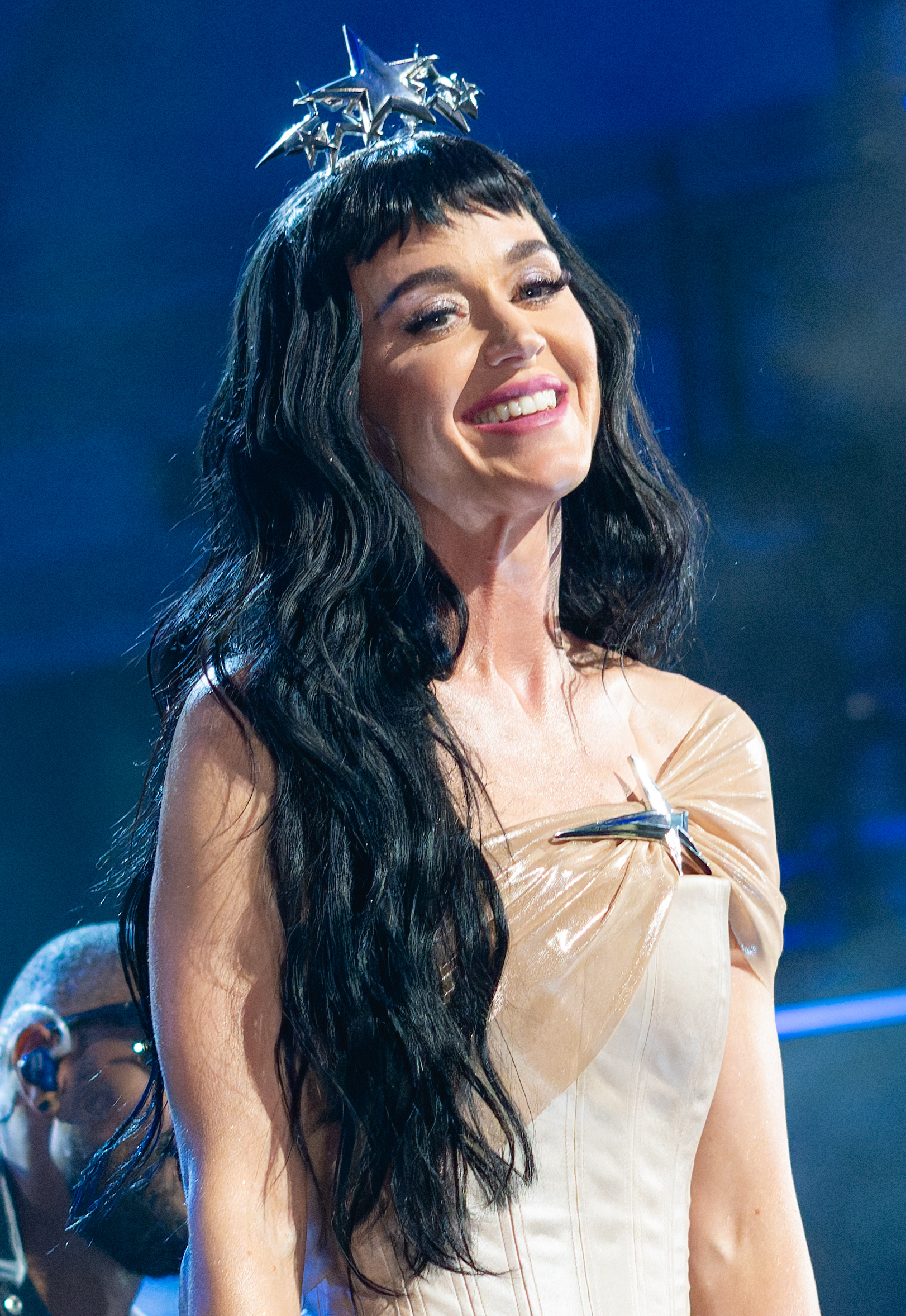
Katy Perry co-wrote two songs for Gomez, "Rock God" and "That's More Like It".

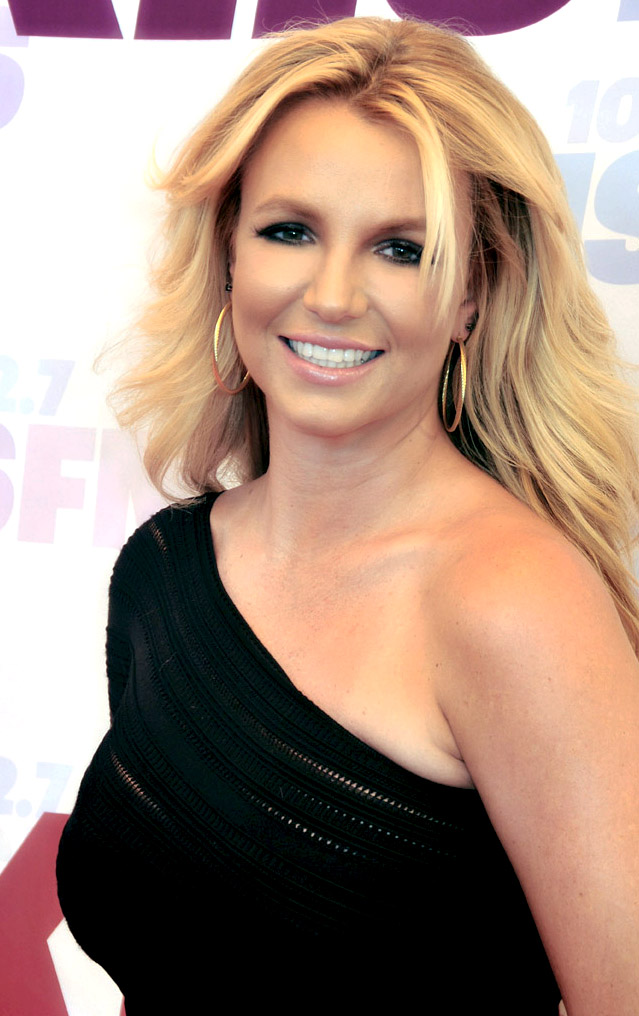
Britney Spears co-wrote "Whiplash".

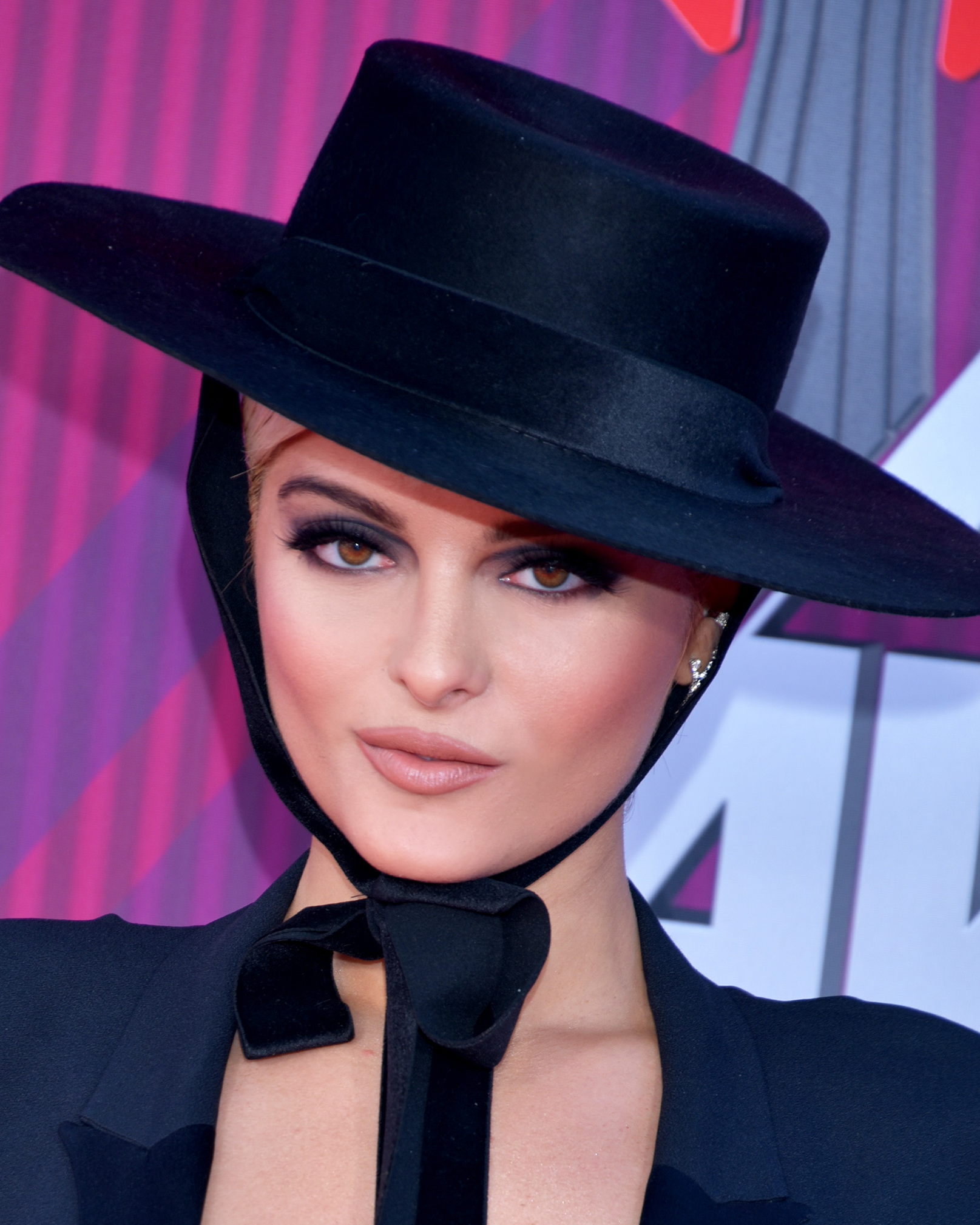
Bebe Rexha co-wrote "Like a Champion" and "Crowded Room".

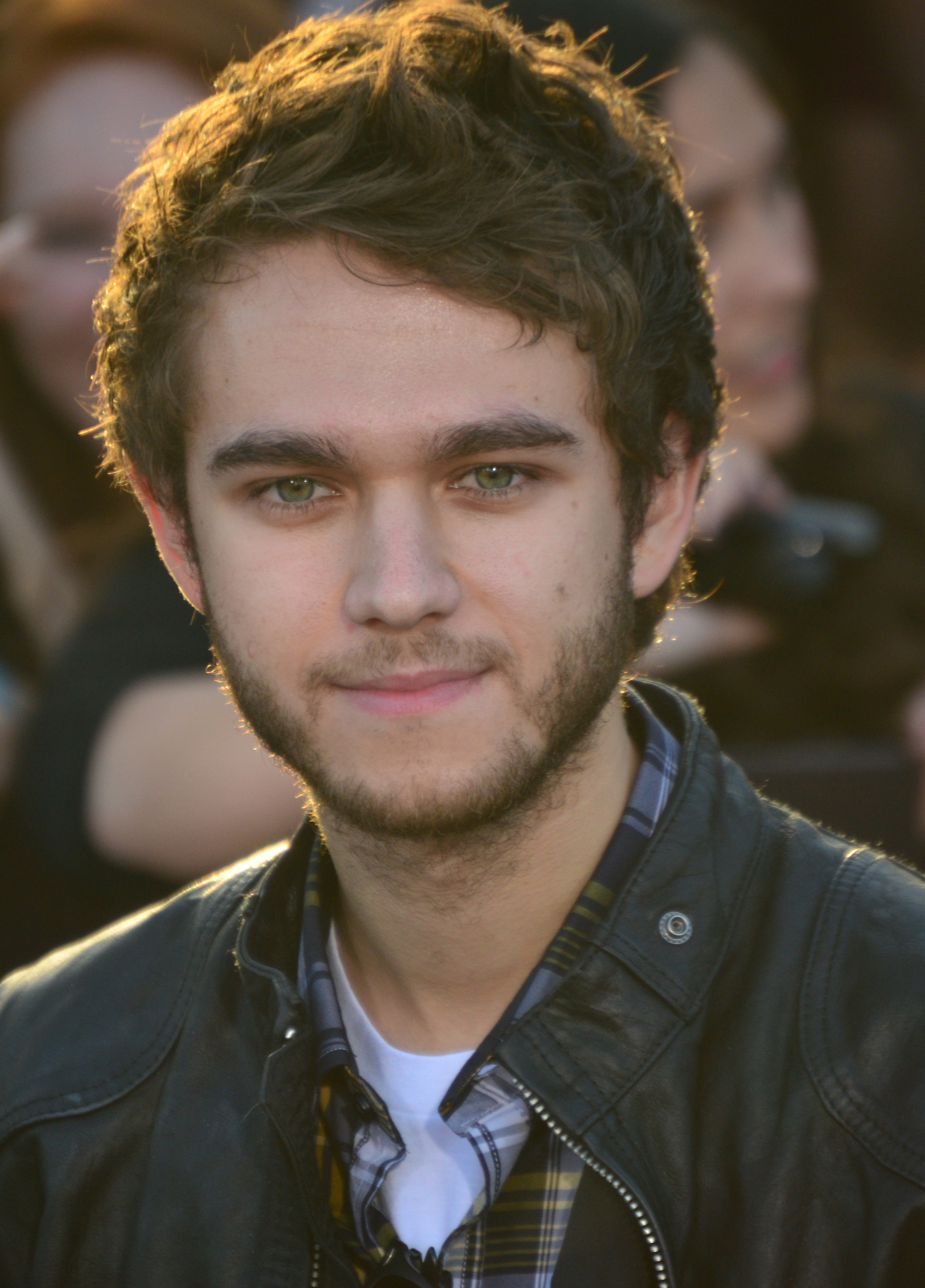
Zedd collaborated with Gomez on "I Want You to Know".

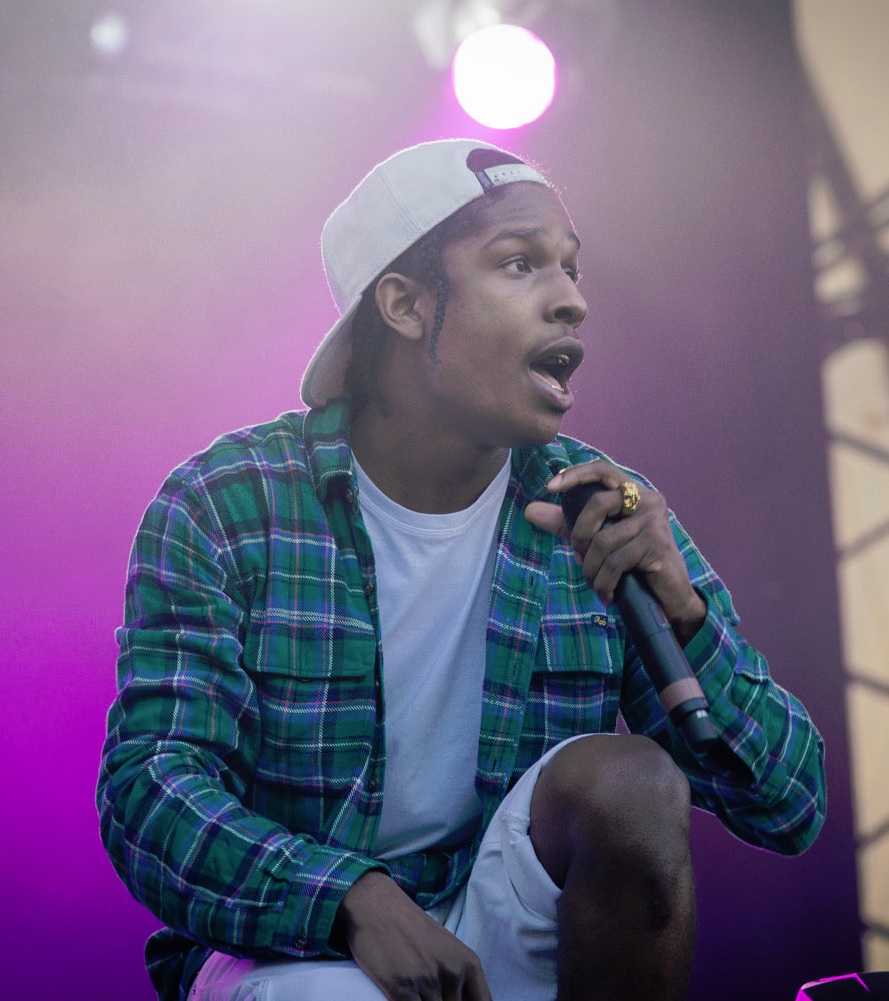
ASAP Rocky co-wrote "Good for You" and appears as a featured artist.

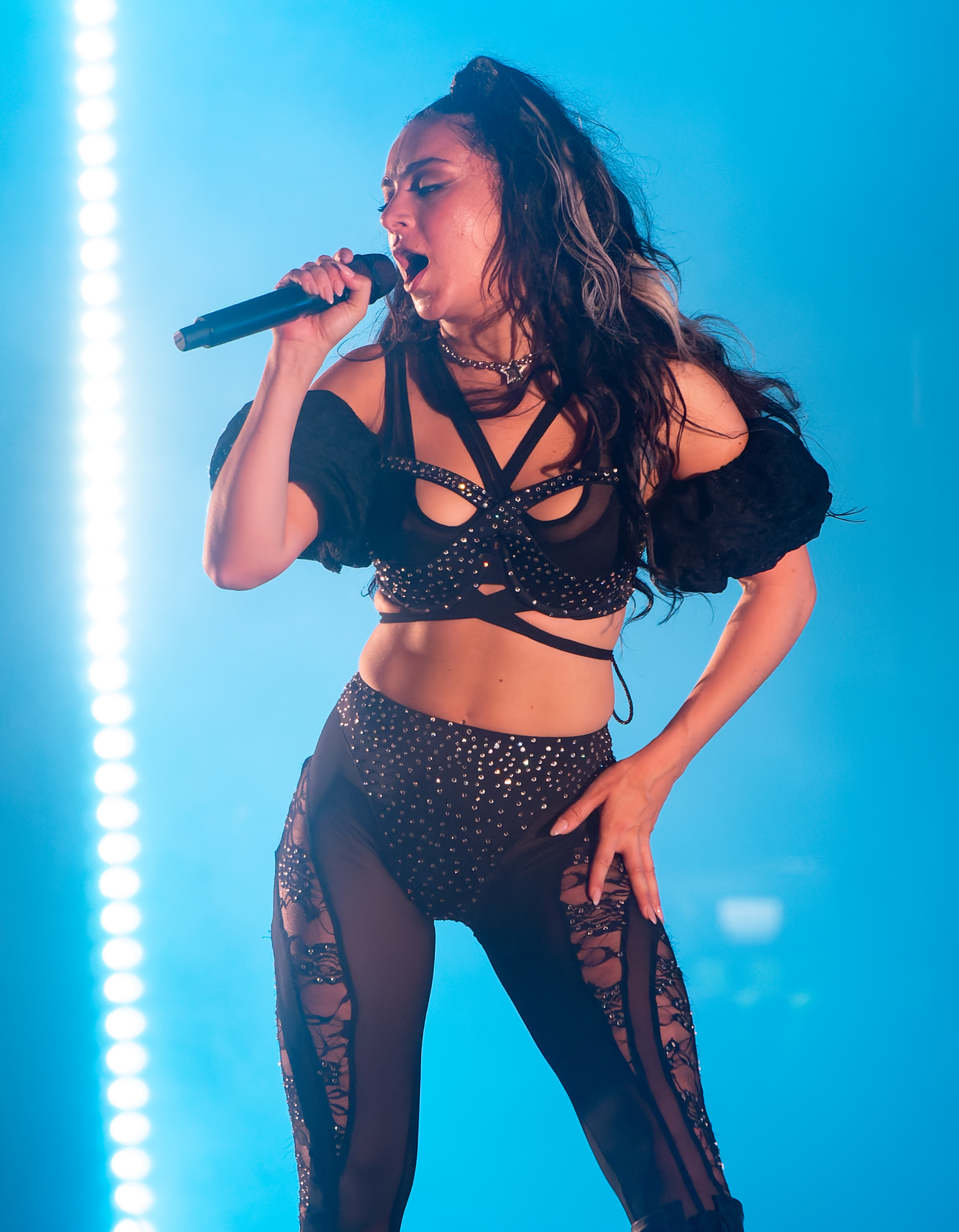
Charli XCX co-wrote "Same Old Love" and "Bluest Flame".

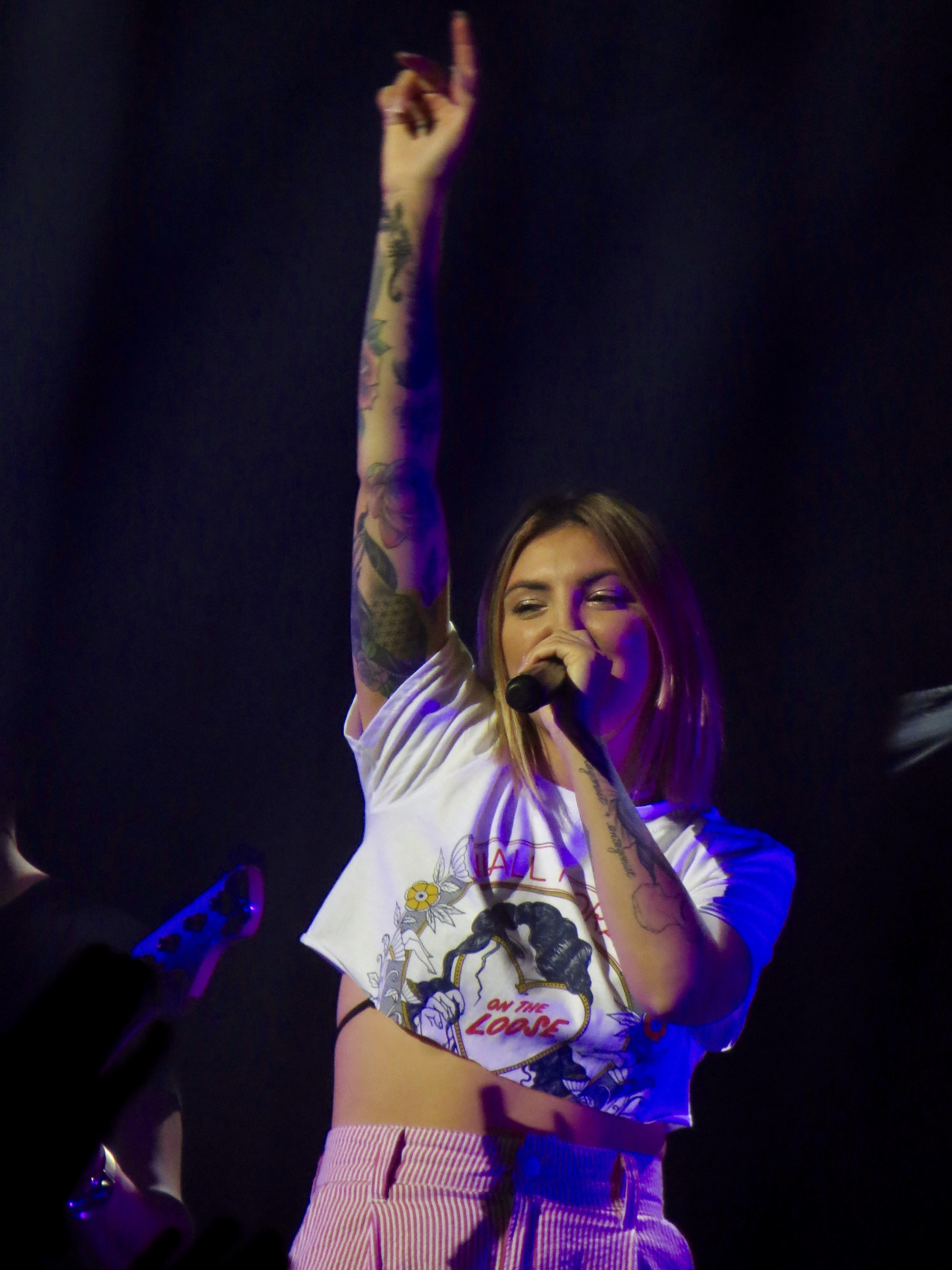
Julia Michaels co-wrote "Good for You", "Hands to Myself", and other songs for Revival. Michaels also collaborated with Gomez on "Anxiety".

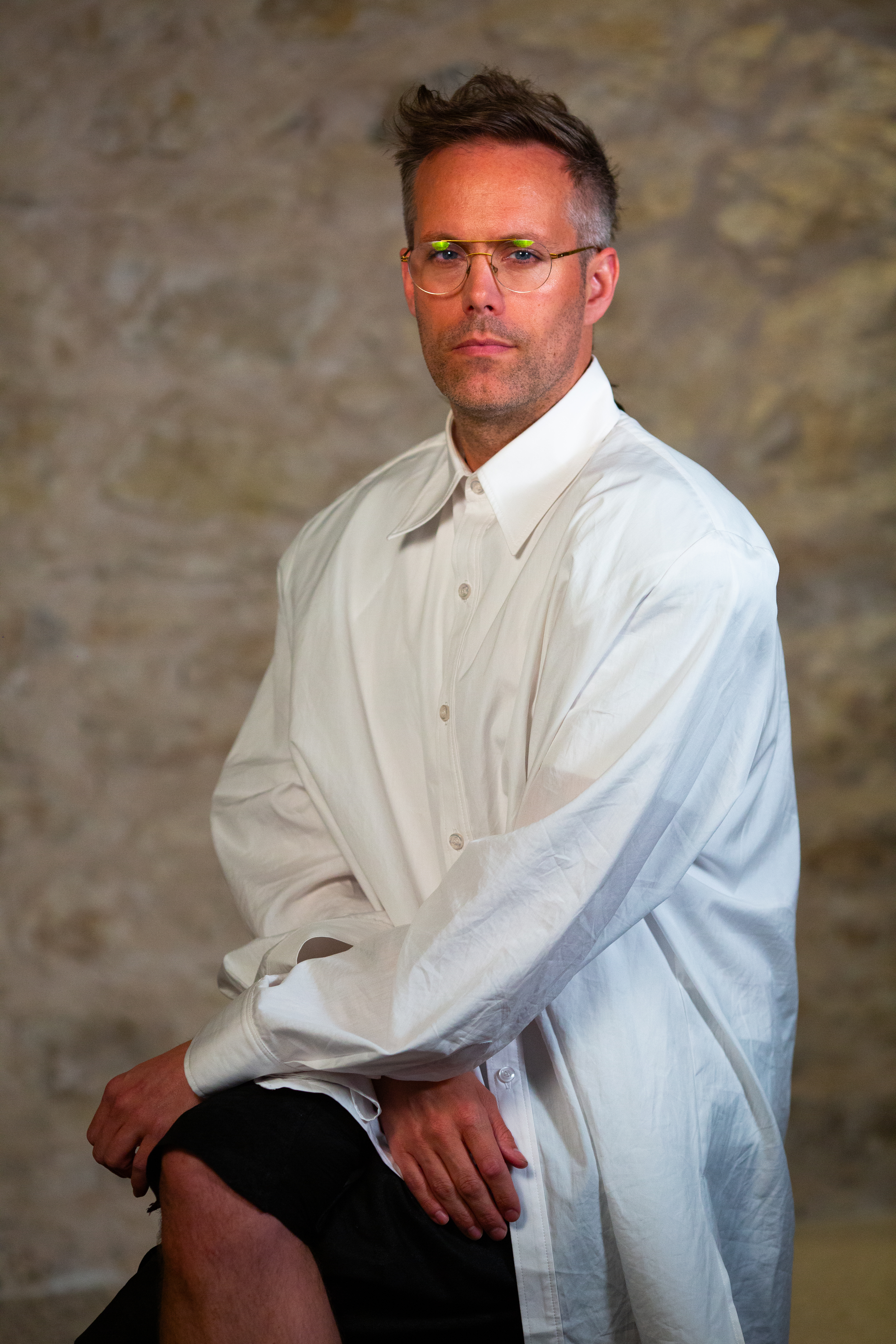
Justin Tranter co-wrote "Good for You", "Hands to Myself", "Bad Liar", and other songs for Revival.

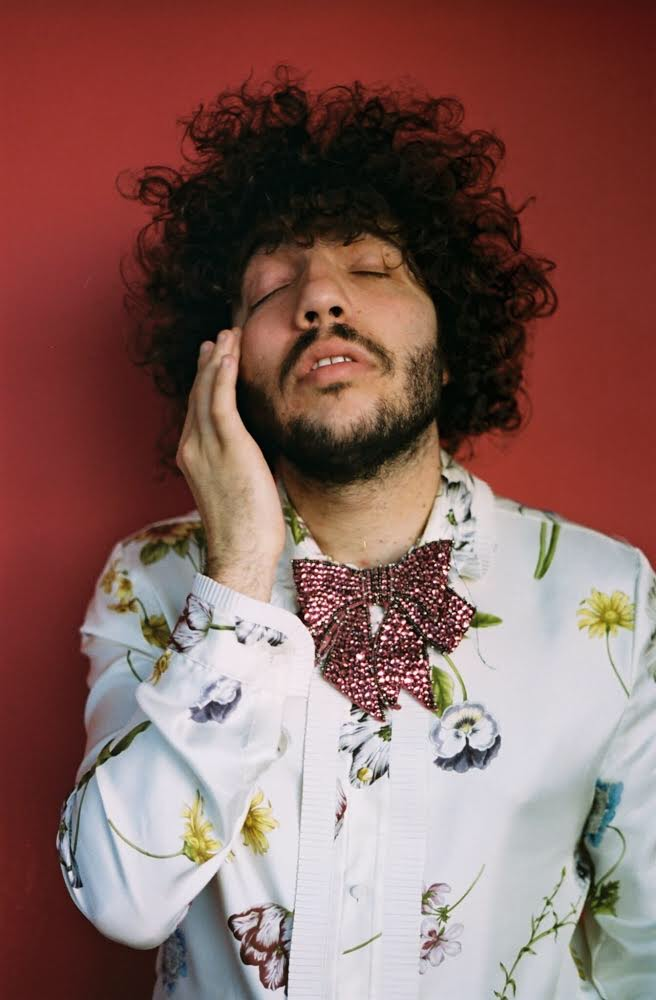
Benny Blanco co-wrote three songs for Gomez : "Same Old Love", "Kill Em with Kindness" and "Trust Nobody".

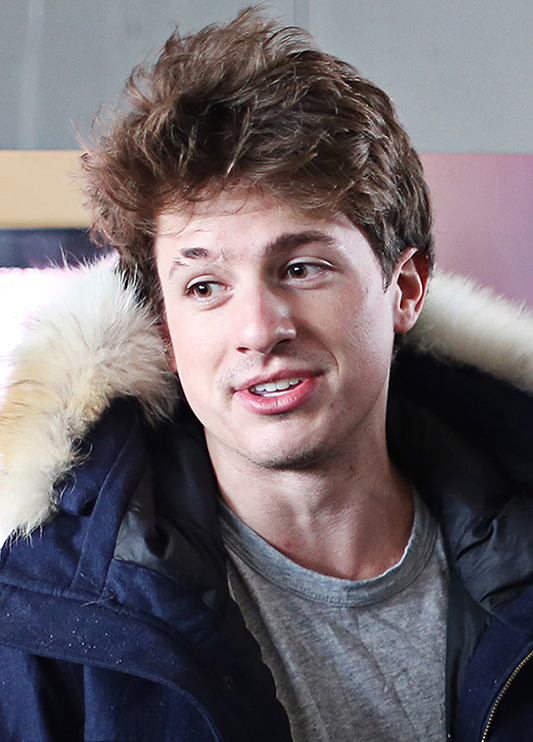
Charlie Puth collaborated with Gomez on "We Don't Talk Anymore".

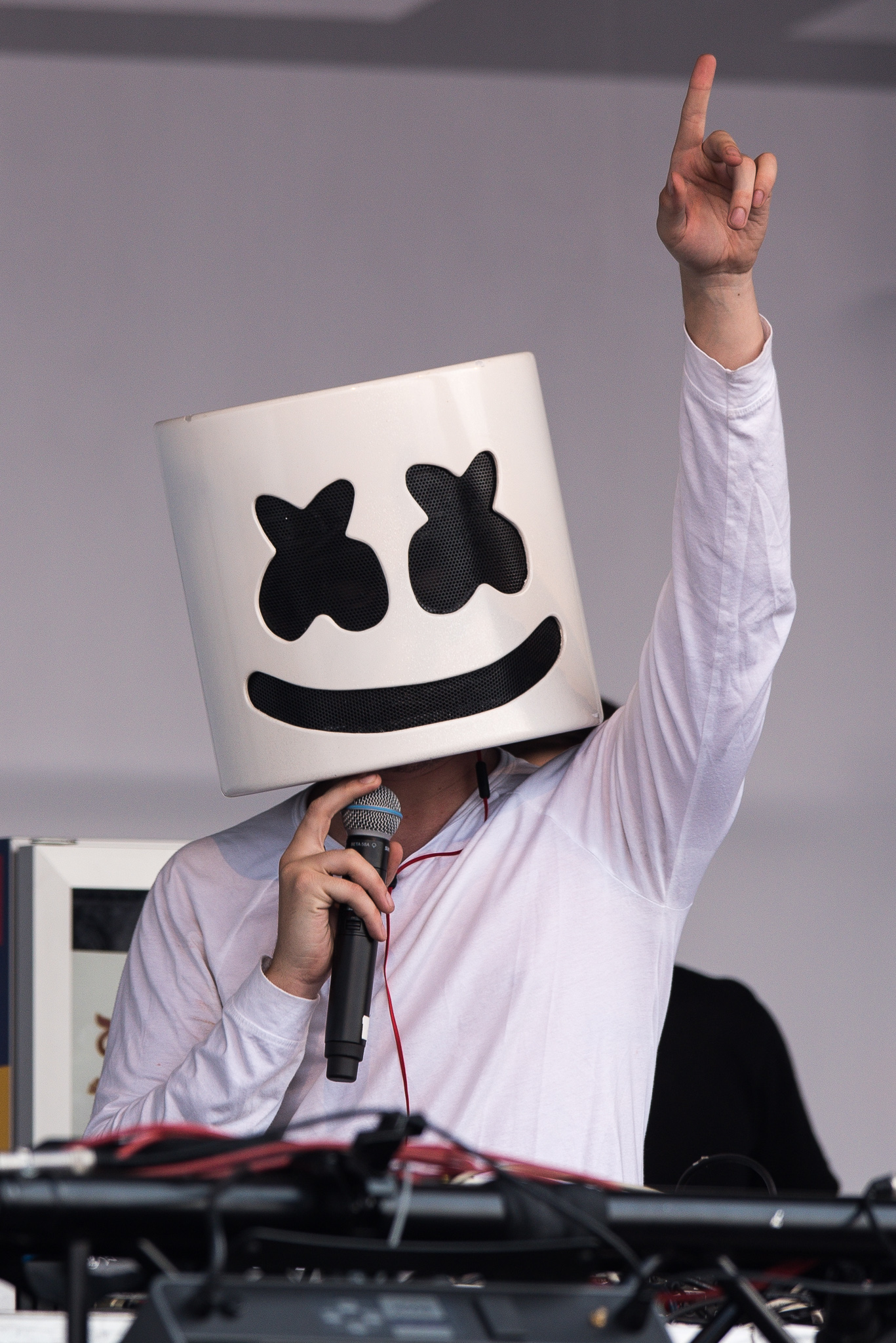
Marshmello collaborated with Gomez on "Wolves".

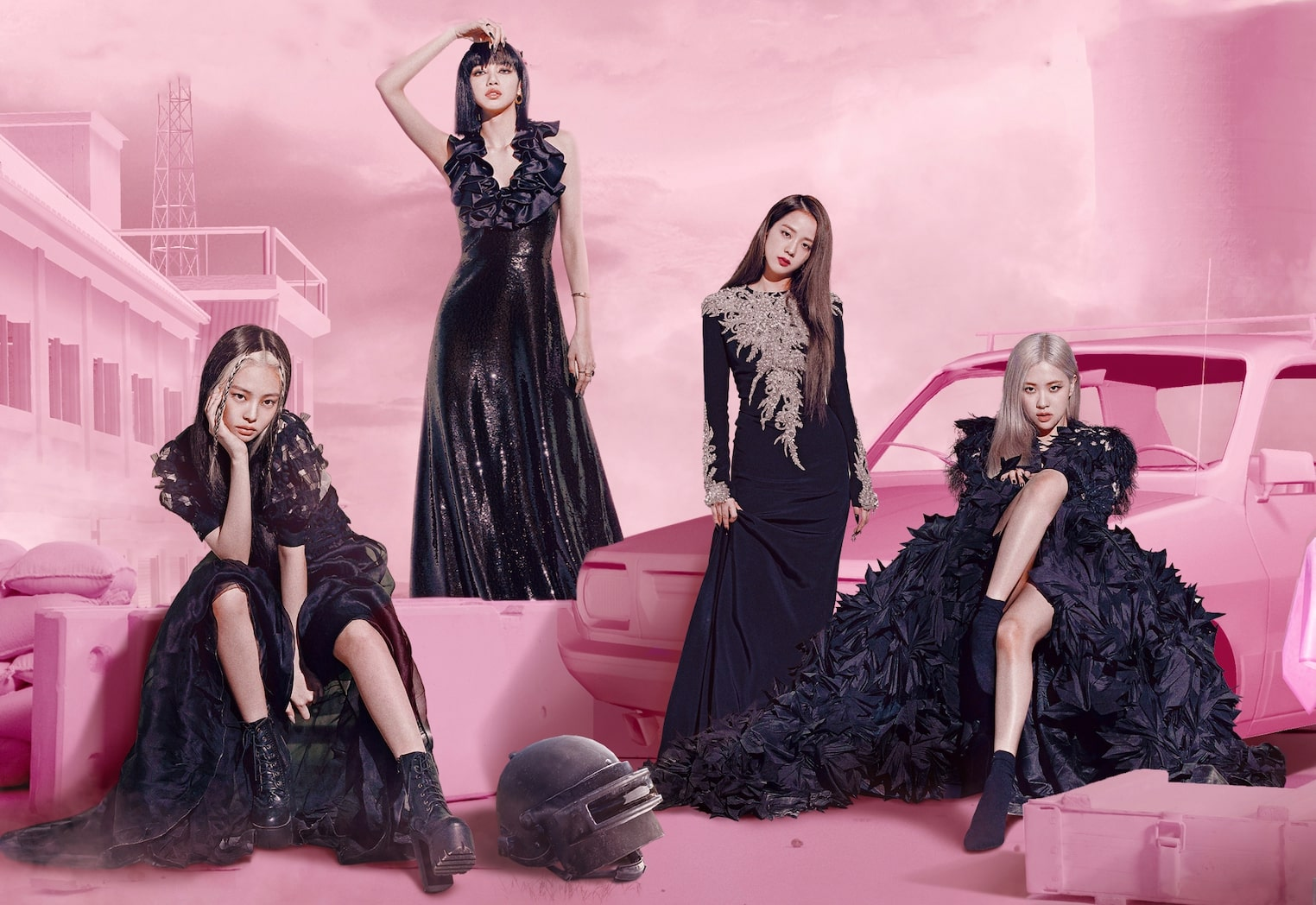
South Korean girl group Blackpink collaborated with Gomez on the song "Ice Cream".

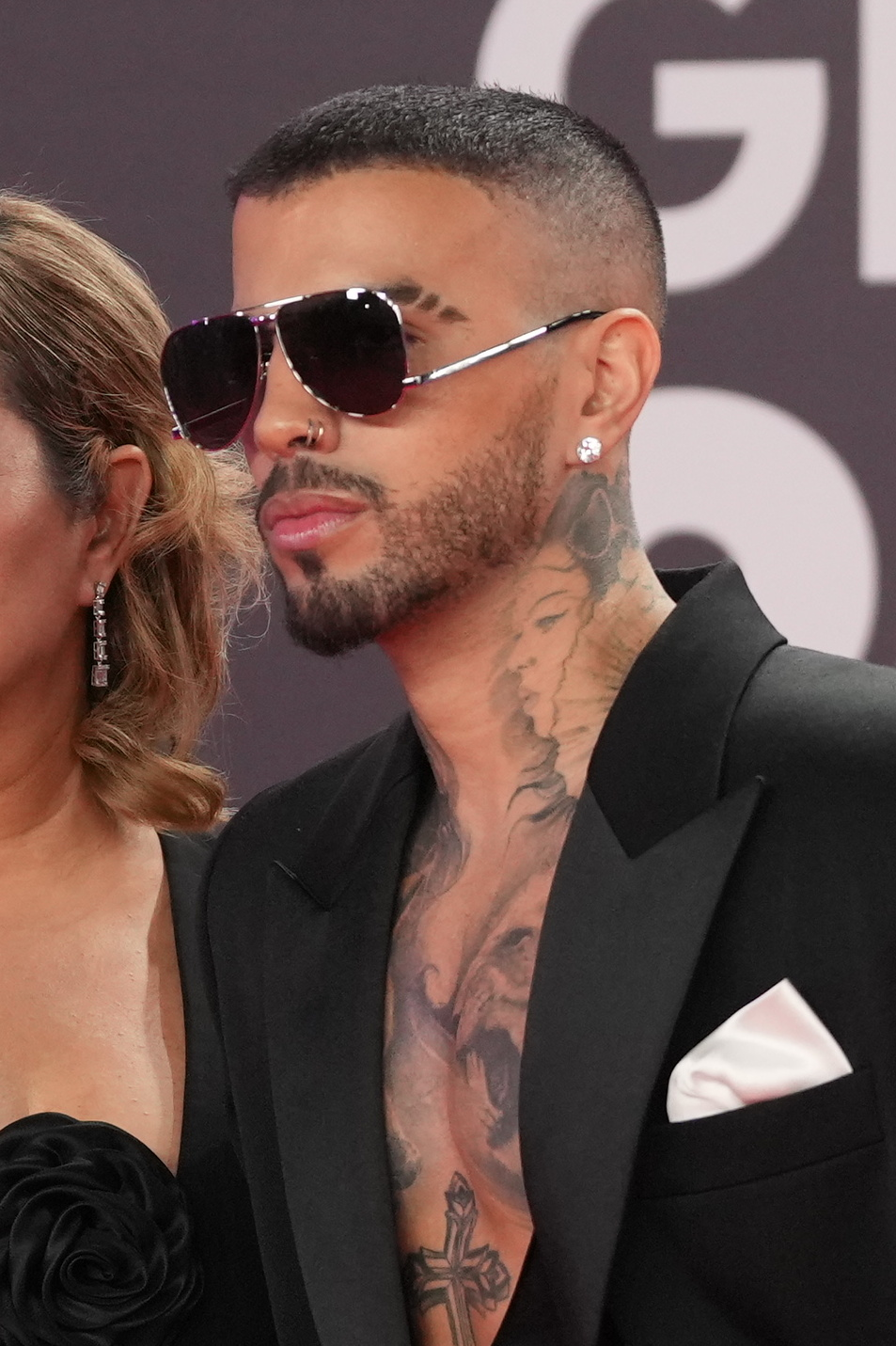
Puerto Rican singer-rapper Rauw Alejandro collaborated with Gomez on "Baila Conmigo".

Name of song, featured performers, writers, originating album, and year released.
Song	Artist(s)	Writer(s)	Originating album	Year	Ref.
"999" †	Selena Gomez and Camilo	Selena Gomez; Camilo Echeverry; Édgar Barrera	—N/a	2021	
"Adiós"	Selena Gomez	Selena Gomez; Abner Cordero Boria; Alejandro Borrero; Carolina Isabel Colón Juarbe; Ivanni Rodríguez; Jorge Luis Perez, Jr. Juan Andrés Ceballos; Marco Masís	Revelación	2021	
"Already Missing You"	Prince Royce featuring Selena Gomez	Geoffrey Royce Rojas; Selena Gomez; Toby Gad; Makeba Riddick	Soy el Mismo	2013	
"Anxiety" †	Julia Michaels featuring Selena Gomez	Julia Michaels; Scott Harris; Selena Gomez; Ian Kirkpatrick	Inner Monologue Part 1	2019	
"As a Blonde" (cover)	Selena Gomez & the Scene	Shelly Peiken; Greg Wells; Fefe Dobson	Kiss & Tell	2009	
"Back to You" †	Selena Gomez	Parrish Warringron; Diederik Van Elsas; Amy Allen; Micah Premnath; Selena Gomez	Rare (Note: The song also appeared on the target and international deluxe of the Rare album.) (Note: This song appears on the soundtrack to the second season of 13 Reasons Why.)	2018	
"Bad Liar" (Note: "Bad Liar" samples "Psycho Killer" by Talking Heads.) †	Selena Gomez	Julia Michaels; Ian Kirkpatrick; David Byrne; Selena Gomez; Tina Weymouth; Justin Tranter; Christopher Frantz	Rare	2017	
"Baila Conmigo" †	Selena Gomez and Rauw Alejandro	Abner Cordero Boria; Christopher Ramos Carballo; Alberto Carlos Melendez; Marco Masís; Elena Rose; Édgar Barrera; Selena Gomez; Alejandro Borrero; Ivanni Rodríguez; Raúl Alejandro Ocasio Ruiz; Jorge A. Diaz	Revelación	2021	
"Bang a Drum"	Selena Gomez	Ralph Churchwell; Michael Nielsen; Joleen Belle	Another Cinderella Story	2008	
"Bang Bang Bang"	Selena Gomez & the Scene	Toby Gad; Meleni Smith; Priscilla Hamilton	When the Sun Goes Down	2011	
"B.E.A.T."	Selena Gomez	Freddy Wexler; Jai Marlon; Heather Jeanette Miley	Stars Dance	2013	
"Bidi Bidi Bom Bom"	Selena featuring Selena Gomez	Selena Quintanilla-Pérez; Pete Astudillo	Enamorada de Ti	2012	
"Bienvenida"	Selena Gomez	Clément Ducol; Camille Dalmais	Emilia Pérez	2024	
"Birthday"	Selena Gomez	Crista Russo; Mike Del Rio; Jacob Kasher Hindlin	Stars Dance	2013	
"Bluest Flame"	Selena Gomez and Benny Blanco	Dylan Brady; Selena Gomez; Benjamin Levin; Magnus August Høiberg; Charlotte Aitchison	I Said I Love You First	2025	
"Body Heat"	Selena Gomez	Antonina Armato; Tim James Price; Chauncey Hollis; Justin Tranter; Julia Michaels; Selena Gomez	Revival	2015	
"Boyfriend" †	Selena Gomez	Selena Gomez; Julia Michaels; Justin Tranter; Jon Wienner; Sam Homaee	Rare	2020	
"Buscando Amor"	Selena Gomez	Selena Gomez; Abner Cordero Boria; Alejandro Borrero; Elena Rose; Ivanni Rodríguez; Marco Masís; Randy Class; Zabdiel De Jesús	Revelación	2021	
"Call Me When You Break Up" †	Selena Gomez, Benny Blanco and Gracie Abrams	Selena Gomez; Benjamin Levin; Dylan Brady; Gracie Abrams; Julia Michaels; Justin Tranter; Magnus August Høiberg; Mattias Larsson; Robin Fredriksson	I Said I Love You First	2025	
"Calm Down" †	Rema and Selena Gomez	Amanda Ibanez; Divine Ikubor; Selena Gomez; Michael Hunter; Alexandre Uwaifo	Rave & Roses Ultra	2022	
"Camouflage"	Selena Gomez	Badriia Bourelly; Christopher Braide	Revival	2015	
"Cologne"	Selena Gomez	Chloe Angelides; Ross Golan; Mikkel Eriksen; Tor Erik Hermansen; Kent Sundberg; Cato Sundberg; Selena Gomez	Revival	2015	
"Come & Get It" †	Selena Gomez	Ester Dean; Mikkel S. Eriksen; Tor E. Hermansen	Stars Dance	2013	
"Cowboy" (Note: A remix of "Cowboy" with GloRilla was released on May 2, 2025.)	Selena Gomez and Benny Blanco	Selena Gomez; Jake Torrey; Benjamin Levin; Amanda Ibanez; Magnus August Høiberg; Gloria Woods (Note: Credited as the songwriter on the remix version.)	I Said I Love You First	2025	
"Crowded Room"	Selena Gomez featuring 6lack	Selena Gomez; Bleta Rexha; Simon Wilcox; Nolan Lambroza; Ricardo Valentine; Simon Rosen	Rare	2020	
"Cruella de Vil" (cover)	Selena Gomez	Mel Leven	Disneymania 6	2008	
"Crush"	Selena Gomez & the Scene	Ted Bruner; Trey Vittetoe; Gina Schock	Kiss & Tell	2009	
"Cut You Off"	Selena Gomez	Selena Gomez; David Pramik; Lisa Owen; Chloe Angelides	Rare	2020	
"Dámelo To'"	Selena Gomez featuring Myke Towers	Selena Gomez; Abner Cordero Boria; Alberto Carlos Melendez; Alejandro Borrero; Elena Rose; Christopher Ramos Carballo; Ivanni Rodríguez; Julia Michaels; Marco Masís; Michael Torres Monge	Revelación	2021	
"Dance Again"	Selena Gomez	Selena Gomez; Mattias Larsson; Robin Fredriksson; Justin Tranter; Caroline Ailin	Rare	2020	
"De Una Vez"	Selena Gomez	Selena Gomez; Abner Boria; Christopher Ramos; Marco Masís; Elena Rose; Alejandro Borrero; Ivanni Rodríguez; Ricardo Lopez	Revelación	2021	
"Disappear"	Selena Gomez	Will Anderson; John Fields; William James McAuley III	Wizards of Waverly Place	2009	
"Do It"	Selena Gomez	Selena Gomez; Antonina Armato; Tim James Price; David Jost	For You	2014	
"Do You Wanna Be Perfect"	Selena Gomez and Benny Blanco	Selena Gomez; Benjamin Levin; Jeremy Malvin; Magnus August Høiberg	I Said I Love You First	2025	
"Don't Take It Personally"	Selena Gomez and Benny Blanco	Blake Slatkin; Selena Gomez; John Stephen Sudduth; Justin Tranter; Benjamin Levin	I Said I Love You First	2025	
"Don't Wanna Cry"	Selena Gomez and Benny Blanco	Blake Slatkin; Jackson Shanks; Selena Gomez; John Stephen Sudduth; Justin Tranter; Benjamin Levin; Sébastien Akchoté-Bozović; Magnus August Høiberg	I Said I Love You First	2025	
"Everything Is Not What It Seems"	Selena Gomez	John Adair; Ryan Elder; Bradley Hamilton; Stephen Hampton	Wizards of Waverly Place	2009	
"Falling Down" †	Selena Gomez & the Scene	Ted Bruner; Trey Vittetoe; Gina Schock	Kiss & Tell	2009	
"Feel Me"	Selena Gomez	Selena Gomez; Jacob Kasher Hindlin; Ammar Malik; Ross Golan; Phil Shaouy; Lisa Scinta; Kurtis McKenzie; Jon Mills	Rare	2020	
"Fetish" †	Selena Gomez featuring Gucci Mane	Alex Schwartz; Chloe Angelides; Brett McLaughlin; Selena Gomez; Jonas Jeberg; Radric Davis; Gino Barletta; Joseph Khajadourian	Rare	2017	
"Forget Forever"	Selena Gomez	Jason Evigan; Clarence Coffee; Alexander Izquierdo; Stefan Johnson; Jordan K. Johnson; Marcus Lomax	Stars Dance	2013	
"Fly to Your Heart"	Selena Gomez	Michelle Tumes	Tinker Bell	2008	
"Fun"	Selena Gomez	Selena Gomez; Julia Michaels; Scott Harris; Mark Williams; Raul Cubina	Rare	2020	
"Ghost of You"	Selena Gomez & the Scene	Jonas Jeberg; Shelly Peiken; Rasmus Seebach	A Year Without Rain	2010	
"Good for You" †	Selena Gomez featuring ASAP Rocky	Julia Michaels; Nolan Lambroza; Hector Delgado; Selena Gomez; Rakim Mayers; Nicholas Monson; Justin Tranter	Revival	2015	
"Guess You Could Say I'm in Love" (Note: Greg Gonzalez provided uncredited vocals for "Guess You Could Say I'm in Love".)	Selena Gomez and Benny Blanco	Gregory Steven Gonzalez; Selena Gomez; Justin Tranter; Benjamin Levin; Magnus August Høiberg	I Said I Love You First	2025	
"Hands" †	Selena Gomez among various artists	Justin Tranter; Julia Michaels; Michael Tucker	—N/a	2016	
"Hands to Myself" †	Selena Gomez	Justin Tranter; Julia Michaels; Robin Fredriksson; Mattias Larsson; Max Martin; Selena Gomez (Note: Gomez is not credited as a writer on Revival booklet, although she is listed as a writer in both ASCAP and BMI repertoires.)	Revival	2015	
"The Heart Wants What It Wants" †	Selena Gomez	Selena Gomez; Antonina Armato; David Jost; Tim James Price	For You	2014	
"Hit the Lights" †	Selena Gomez & the Scene	Leah Haywood; Daniel James; Tony Nilsson	When the Sun Goes Down	2011	
"Hold On"	Ben Kweller and Selena Gomez	Charlton Pettus; Simon Steadman	Rudderless	2014	
"How Does It Feel to Be Forgotten"	Selena Gomez and Benny Blanco	Selena Gomez; John Stephen Sudduth; Justin Tranter; William Fly; Benjamin Levin	I Said I Love You First	2025	
"I Can't Get Enough" †	Benny Blanco, Selena Gomez, J Balvin and Tainy	Maria Cristina Chiluiza; Jesús Manuel Nieves Cortés; Marco Masís; Mike Sabath; Benjamin Levin; Selena Gomez; José Álvaro Osorio Balvín	I Said I Love You First	2019	
"I Don't Miss You at All"	Selena Gomez & the Scene	Lindy Robbins; Toby Gad	Kiss & Tell	2009	
"I Got U"	Selena Gomez & the Scene	Matthew Wilder; Tamara Dunn	Kiss & Tell	2009	
"I Like It That Way"	Selena Gomez	Joshua Coleman; Jacob Kasher Hindlin; Rickard Göransson; Fransisca Hall; Alexander Castillo Vasquez	Stars Dance	2013	
"I Promise You"	Selena Gomez & the Scene	Isaac Hasson; Lindy Robbins; Mher Filian	Kiss & Tell	2009	
"I Said I Love You First"	Selena Gomez and Benny Blanco	Selena Gomez; Benjamin Levin; Finneas O'Connell	I Said I Love You First	2025	
"I Want You to Know" †	Zedd featuring Selena Gomez	Anton Zaslavski; Ryan Tedder; Kevin Nicholas Drew	True Colors	2015	
"I Won't Apologize"	Selena Gomez & the Scene	Selena Gomez; John Fields; William McAuley	Kiss & Tell	2009	
"Ice Cream" †	Blackpink and Selena Gomez	Rebecca Rose Johnson; Victoria Monét; Teddy Park; Tommy Brown; Steven Franks; Jeong Hun-Seol; Selena Gomez; Ariana Grande	The Album	2020	
"In The Dark" †	Selena Gomez	Selena Gomez; Andrew Wotman; Louis Bell; Alexandra Tamposi; Justin Tranter; Henry Russell Walter	Nobody Wants This	2025	
"Intuition"	Selena Gomez & the Scene featuring Eric Bellinger	Toby Gad; Lindy Robbins; Eric Bellinger	A Year Without Rain	2010	
"It Ain't Me" †	Kygo and Selena Gomez	Andrew Wotman; Brian Lee; Alexandra Tamposi; Kyrre Gørvell-Dahll; Selena Gomez	Stargazing and Rare	2017	
"Kill Em with Kindness" †	Selena Gomez	Antonina Armato; Tim James Price; Benjamin Levin; Dave Audé; Selena Gomez	Revival	2015	
"Kinda Crazy"	Selena Gomez	Selena Gomez; Rami Yacoub; Justin Tranter; Jasmine Thompson; Kristoffer Fodgelmark; Albin Nedler	Rare	2020	
"Kiss & Tell"	Selena Gomez & the Scene	Ted Bruner; Trey Vittetoe; Gina Schock	Kiss & Tell	2009	
"Let Me Get Me"	Selena Gomez	Selena Gomez; Mattias Larsson; Robin Fredriksson; Justin Tranter; Caroline Ailin	Rare	2020	
"Let Somebody Go" †	Coldplay and Selena Gomez	Apple Martin; Bill Rahko; Chris Martin; Guy Berryman; Jonny Buckland; Leland Wayne; Max Martin; Olivia Waithe; Oscar Holter; Will Champion	Music of the Spheres	2021	
"Like a Champion"	Selena Gomez	Daniel James; Leah Haywood; Peter Thomas; Bleta Rexha; Mark Myrie; Leroy Sibbles	Stars Dance	2013	
"Live Like There's No Tomorrow"	Selena Gomez & the Scene	Matt Bronleewe; Nicky Chinn; Andrew Fromm; Meghan Kabir	Ramona and Beezus	2010	
"Look at Her Now"	Selena Gomez	Selena Gomez; Julia Michaels; Justin Tranter; Ian Kirkpatrick	Rare	2019	
"Lose You to Love Me" (Note: A Demo Version of "Lose You to Love Me" was released on September 29, 2019.) †	Selena Gomez	Selena Gomez; Julia Michaels; Justin Tranter; Mattias Larsson; Robin Fredriksson	Rare	2019	
"Love On" †	Selena Gomez	Selena Gomez; Julia Michaels; Michael Pollack; Stefan Johnson; Jordan K. Johnson; Isaiah Tejada	—N/a	2024	
"Love Will Remember"	Selena Gomez	Antonina Armato; Desmond Child; David Jost; Tim James Price	Stars Dance	2013	
"Love You like a Love Song" †	Selena Gomez & the Scene	Antonina Armato; Tim James Price; Adam Schmalholz	When the Sun Goes Down	2011	
"Lover In Me"	Selena Gomez	Selena Gomez; Daniel James; Leah Haywood; Brian Lee; Stuart Crichton	Stars Dance	2013	
"Magic"	Selena Gomez	William Lyall; David Paton	Wizards of Waverly Place	2009	
"Magical"	Selena Gomez	Leah Haywood; Leon Haywood; Daniel James; Shelly Peiken	Wizards of Waverly Place	2009	
"Me & My Girls"	Selena Gomez	Antonina Armato; Tim James Price; Matt Morris; Selena Gomez	Revival	2015	
"Me & the Rhythm"	Selena Gomez	Justin Tranter; Julia Michaels; Robin Fredriksson; Mattias Larsson; Selena Gomez	Revival	2015	
"Mi camino"	Selena Gomez	Clément Ducol; Camille Dalmais	Emilia Pérez	2024	
"Middle of Nowhere"	Selena Gomez & the Scene	Espen Lind; Amund Bjorklund; Sandy Wilhelm; Carmen Michelle Key	When the Sun Goes Down	2011	
"More" (Note: A Spanish version of "More" was released in 2014.)	Selena Gomez & the Scene	Isaac Hasson; Lindy Robbins; Mher Filian	Kiss & Tell	2009	
"Music Feels Better"	Selena Gomez	Selena Gomez; Leah Haywood; Daniel James; Jeremy Coleman	Stars Dance	2013	
"My Dilemma"	Selena Gomez & the Scene	Antonina Armato; Tim James Price; Devrim Karaoglu	When the Sun Goes Down	2011	
"My Mind & Me" †	Selena Gomez	Selena Gomez; Amy Allen; Jonathan Bellion; Jordan K. Johnson; Stefan Johnson; Michael Pollack	—N/a	2022	
"Naturally" †	Selena Gomez & the Scene	Antonina Armato; Tim James Price; Devrim Karaoglu	Kiss & Tell	2009	
"New Classic"	Drew Seeley and Selena Gomez	Ralph Churchwell; Michael Nielsen; Drew Seeley; Joleen Belle	Another Cinderella Story	2008	
"Nobody"	Selena Gomez	Julia Michaels; Shane Stevens; Nicholas Monson; Selena Gomez	Revival	2015	
"Nobody Does It Like You"	Selena Gomez	Selena Gomez; Toby Gad; Lindy Robbins	Stars Dance	2013	
"Off the Chain"	Selena Gomez & the Scene	Antonina Armato; Tim James Price; Devrim Karaoglu	A Year Without Rain	2010	
"Ojos Tristes" (Note: "Ojos Tristes" samples "El muchacho de los ojos tristes" by Jeanette.) †	Selena Gomez, Benny Blanco and The Marías	Josh Conway; María Zardoya; Selena Gomez; Benjamin Levin; Amanda Ibanez; Manuel Álvarez-Beigbeder Pérez; Purificación Casas Romero	I Said I Love You First	2025	
"One and the Same"	Demi Lovato and Selena Gomez	Dave Derby; Colleen Fitzpatrick; Michael Kotch	Disney Channel Playlist	2009	
"Only You" (cover)	Selena Gomez	Vince Clarke	13 Reasons Why	2017	
"Outlaw"	Selena Gomez & the Scene	Selena Gomez; Antonina Armato; Tim James Price	When the Sun Goes Down	2011	
"Outta My Hands (Loco)"	Selena Gomez	Antonina Armato; Tim James Price; Selena Gomez	Revival	2015	
"Past Life" (Note: A remix of "Past Life" by Lil Mosey was released on July 31, 2020.) †	Trevor Daniel and Selena Gomez	Trevor Daniel; Finneas O'Connell; Caroline Pennell; Jay Stolar; Mich Cougin; Sean Myer; Selena Gomez	—N/a	2020	
"People You Know"	Selena Gomez	Selena Gomez; Mathieu Jomphe Lépine; Alexandra Hope; Stephenie Jones; Aaron Puckett; Jason Evigan	Rare	2020	
"Perfect"	Selena Gomez	Julia Michaels; Justin Tranter; Felix Snow; Selena Gomez	Revival	2015	
"Pick It Up"	Cardi B featuring Selena Gomez	Belcalis Almánzar; Philip Constable; Jordan Thorpe; Roosevelt Jean; Hadar Adora; Lewis Shoates	Am I the Drama?	2025	
"Rare" †	Selena Gomez	Selena Gomez; Madison Love; Brett McLaughlin; Nolan Lambroza; Simon Rosen	Rare	2020	
"Revival"	Selena Gomez	Antonina Armato; Tim James Price; Chauncey Hollis; Justin Tranter; Julia Michaels; Adam Schmalholz; Selena Gomez	Revival	2015	
"Ring"	Selena Gomez	Selena Gomez; Sean Douglas; Julie Frost; Breyan Isaac; David Ciente; Nolan Lambroza	Rare	2020	
"Rise"	Selena Gomez	Antonina Armato; Tim James Price; Adam Schmalholz; Selena Gomez	Revival	2015	
"Rock God"	Selena Gomez & the Scene	Katy Perry; Printz Board; Victoria Jane Horn	A Year Without Rain	2010	
"Round & Round" †	Selena Gomez & the Scene	Kevin Rudolf; Jacob Kasher; Fefe Dobson; Jeff Halavacs; Andrew Bolooki	A Year Without Rain	2010	
"Same Old Love" (Note: A remix of "Same Old Love" by Fetty Wap was released on January 8, 2016.) †	Selena Gomez	Mikkel Eriksen; Tor Erik Hermansen; Benjamin Levin; Charlotte Aitchison; Ross Golan	Revival	2015	
"Save the Day"	Selena Gomez	Mitch Allan; Jason Evigan; Livvi Franc	Stars Dance	2013	
"Scared of Loving You"	Selena Gomez and Benny Blanco	Benjamin Levin; Selena Gomez; Finneas O'Connell	I Said I Love You First	2025	
"Selfish Love" †	DJ Snake and Selena Gomez	William Grigahcine; Selena Gomez; Katriana Huguet; Marty Maro; Karen Sotomayor; Kris Floyd	Revelación	2021	
"Send It On"	Disney's Friends for Change featuring Demi Lovato, Jonas Brothers, Miley Cyrus and Selena Gomez	Adam Anders; Nikki Hassman; Peer Åström	—N/a	2009	
"Shake It Up"	Selena Gomez	Jeannie Lurie; Aris Archontis; Chen Neeman	Shake It Up: Break It Down	2013	
"She"	Selena Gomez	Selena Gomez; Justin Tranter; Uzoechi Emenike; Jon Wienner; Sam Hoemaee	Rare	2020	
"Sick of You"	Selena Gomez & the Scene	Matt Squire; Lucas Banker	A Year Without Rain	2010	
"Single Soon" †	Selena Gomez	Ammar Malik; Benjamin Levin; Jacob Kasher Hindlin; Lisa Scinta; Magnus August Høiberg; Phil Shaouy; Ross Golan; Selena Gomez	—N/a	2023	
"Slow Down" †	Selena Gomez	Lindy Robbins; Julia Michaels; Niles Hollowell-Dhar; David Kuncio; Freddy Wexler	Stars Dance	2013	
"Sober"	Selena Gomez	Chloe Angelides; Jacob Kasher Hindlin; Julia Michaels; Mikkel Eriksen; Tor Erik Hermansen	Revival	2015	
"Souvenir"	Selena Gomez	Selena Gomez; Madison Love; Sean Douglas; Ian Kirkpatrick	Rare	2020	
"Spotlight"	Selena Gomez & the Scene	Shelly Peiken; Nikki Hassman; Peer Åström; Adam Anders	A Year Without Rain	2010	
"Stained"	Selena Gomez	Selena Gomez; Magnus August Høiberg; Julia Michaels; Daniel Omelio	I Said I Love You First	2025	
"Stars Dance"	Selena Gomez	Antonina Armato; Tim James Price; Adam Schmalholz	Stars Dance	2013	
"Stop & Erase"	Selena Gomez & the Scene	Ted Bruner; Trey Vittetoe; Gina Schock	Kiss & Tell	2009	
"Summer's Not Hot"	Selena Gomez & the Scene	Nadir Khayat; Antonina Armato; Tim James Price	A Year Without Rain	2010	
"Sunset Blvd" †	Selena Gomez and Benny Blanco	Selena Gomez; Justin Tranter; Michael Pollack; Benjamin Levin; Amanda Ibanez; Jeremy Malvin; Magnus August Høiberg	I Said I Love You First	2025	
"Survivors"	Selena Gomez	Ross Golan; Steve Mac	Revival	2015	
"A Sweeter Place"	Selena Gomez featuring Kid Cudi	Selena Gomez; Scott Seguro Mescudi; Madison Love; Uzoechi Emenike; Ian Kirkpatrick	Rare	2020	
"Taki Taki" †	DJ Snake featuring Selena Gomez, Ozuna and Cardi B	William Grigahcine; Ava Brignol; Jorden Thorpe; Belcalis Almánzar; Selena Gomez; Juan Carlos Ozuna Rosado; Juan Gabriel Rivera	Carte Blanche	2018	
"Talk"	Selena Gomez and Benny Blanco	Ian Kirkpatrick; Selena Gomez; Justin Tranter; John Stephen Sudduth; John McCrea; Benjamin Levin	I Said I Love You First	2025	
"Te Olvido (La La)" †	Benny Blanco, Selena Gomez and Becky G	Benjamin Levin; Kevyn Mauricio Cruz Moreno; Magnus August Høiberg; Nathaniel Campany; Rebbeca Marie Gomez; Sara Schell; Selena Gomez	Hermoso	2026	
"Tell Me Something I Don't Know" (Note: A remix of "Tell Me Something I Don't Know" was released in 2009.) †	Selena Gomez	Ralph Churchwell; Michael Nielsen; Antonina Armato	Another Cinderella Story and Kiss & Tell	2008 and 2009	
"That's More Like It"	Selena Gomez & the Scene	Josh Alexander; Billy Steinberg; Katy Perry	When the Sun Goes Down	2011	
"That's When I'll Care"	Selena Gomez and Benny Blanco	Ian Kirkpatrick; Selena Gomez; Justin Tranter; Julia Michaels; Benjamin Levin	I Said I Love You First	2025	
"The Way I Loved You"	Selena Gomez & the Scene	Shelly Peiken; Rob Wells	Kiss & Tell	2009	
"Trust Nobody" †	Cashmere Cat featuring Selena Gomez and Tory Lanez	Magnus August Høiberg; Brittany Hazzard; Daystar Peterson; Selena Gomez; Benjamin Levin; Adam Feeney	9	2016	
"Trust in Me" (cover)	Selena Gomez	Robert B. Sherman; Richard M. Sherman	Disneymania 7	2010	
"Undercover"	Selena Gomez	Niles Hollowell-Dhar; Lindy Robbins; Julia Michaels; Rome Ramirez	Stars Dance	2013	
"Vicio"	Selena Gomez	Selena Gomez; Abner Cordero Boria; Alberto Carlos Melendez; Alejandro Borrero; Elena Rose; Gregory Hein; Ivanni Rodríguez; Marco Masís; Santiago Beltran	Revelación	2021	
"Vulnerable"	Selena Gomez	Selena Gomez; Amy Allen; Jonathan Bellion; Stefan Johnson; Jordan K. Johnson	Rare	2020	
"We Don't Talk Anymore" †	Charlie Puth featuring Selena Gomez	Charles Otto Puth Jr. Jacob Kasher Hindlin; Selena Gomez	Nine Track Mind	2016	
"We Own the Night"	Selena Gomez & the Scene featuring Pixie Lott	Toby Gad; Pixie Lott	When the Sun Goes Down	2011	
"When the Sun Goes Down"	Selena Gomez & the Scene	Selena Gomez; Joey Clement; Steve Sulikowsk; Stefan Abingdon	When the Sun Goes Down	2011	
"Whiplash"	Selena Gomez & the Scene	Greg Kurstin; Nicole Morier; Britney Spears	When the Sun Goes Down	2011	
"Whoa Oh! (Me vs. Everyone) (remix)"	Forever the Sickest Kids featuring Selena Gomez	Austin Bello; Caleb Turman; Jonathan Cook	—N/a	2009	
"Who Says" (Note: A spanish version of "Who Says" was released in 2011.) †	Selena Gomez & the Scene	Emanuel Kiriakou; Priscilla Hamilton	When the Sun Goes Down	2011	
"Winter Wonderland" (cover)	Selena Gomez & the Scene	Felix Bernard; Richard B. Smith	All Wrapped Up Vol. 2	2009	
"Wolves" †	Selena Gomez and Marshmello	Selena Gomez; Christopher Comstock; Brian Lee; Alexandra Tamposi; Andrew Wotman; Louis Bell; Carl Rosen	Rare	2017	
"Write Your Name"	Selena Gomez	Daniel James; Leah Haywood; Arnthor Birgisson	Stars Dance	2013	
"A Year Without Rain" (Note: A spanish version of "A Year Without Rain" was released in 2010.) †	Selena Gomez & the Scene	Toby Gad; Lindy Robbins	A Year Without Rain	2010	
"You Said You Were Sorry"	Selena Gomez and Benny Blanco	Selena Gomez; John Byron; Justin Tranter; Benjamin Levin; Magnus August Høiberg; Amanda Ibanez	I Said I Love You First	2025	
"Younger and Hotter Than Me"	Selena Gomez and Benny Blanco	Selena Gomez; Benjamin Levin; Finneas O'Connell	I Said I Love You First	2025	

== Songwriting credits ==
Song	Artist(s)	Writer(s)	Album	Year	Ref.
"Stay on Me"	Sophie Ellis-Bextor	Sophie Ellis-Bextor; Selena Gomez; Julia Michaels; Caroline Ailin; Thomas Hull	Perimenopop	2025	
"Worst Thing"	NOTD and kenzie	Julia Michaels; Justin Tranter; Selena Gomez; Heather Sommer; Will Murray Dailey; Matteo Scher; Mackenzie Ziegler; Samuel Brandt; Tobias Danielsson; Bubele Booi; David Balshaw	Noted...EP	2022	
