= Vulnerable =

Vulnerable may refer to:

== General ==
- Vulnerability
- Vulnerability (computing)
- Vulnerable adult
- Vulnerable species

== Music ==
=== Albums ===
- Vulnerable (Marvin Gaye album), 1997
- Vulnerable (Tricky album), 2003
- Vulnerable (The Used album), 2012

=== Songs ===
- "Vulnerable" (Roxette song), 1994
- "Vulnerable" (Selena Gomez song), 2020
- "Vulnerable", a song by Secondhand Serenade from Awake, 2007
- "Vulnerable", a song by Pet Shop Boys from Yes, 2009
- "Vulnerable", a song by Tinashe from Black Water, 2013
- "Vulnerability", a song by Operation Ivy from Energy, 1989

== Other uses ==
- Climate change vulnerability, vulnerability to anthropogenic climate change used in discussion of society's response to climate change
- Vulnerable, a scoring feature of the game of contract bridge where larger bonuses and penalties apply; see Glossary of contract bridge terms#Vulnerable
