= Rare (Selena Gomez album) =

2020 studio album by Selena Gomez

- Standard edition cover

Studio album by Selena Gomez
- Released: January 10, 2020
- Studios: Home Away from Home (Los Angeles, CA); MXM (Los Angeles, CA); Interscope (Santa Monica, CA); House Mouse (Stockholm, Sweden); Costa Mesa (Newport, CA); Westlake (West Hollywood, CA); Chalice (Hollywood, CA); Chumba Meadows (Tarzana, CA); EastWest (Hollywood, CA); Studio at the Palms (Las Vegas, NV); No Excuses (Santa Monica, CA); Hydde (Encino, CA); Big Noize (Hollywood, CA); The Hit Factory (Miami, FL); Zenseven (Tarzana, CA); Conway (Los Angeles, CA); PMD (Los Angeles, CA); The Village (Santa Monica, CA)
- Genres: Pop; dance-pop
- Length: 41:59
- Label: Interscope
- Producers: Jon Bellion; Kid Cudi; Sean Douglas; Jason Evigan; Kristoffer Fogelmark; Ian Kirkpatrick; Mattman & Robin; Albin Nedler; Ojivolta; David Pramik; Simon Says; Sir Nolan; The Monsters & Strangerz; Rami Yacoub

Selena Gomez chronology
Revival (2015)	Rare (2020)	Revelación (2021)

Alternative cover
- Deluxe edition cover

Singles from Rare
- 1. "Lose You to Love Me" Released: October 23, 2019; 2. "Rare" Released: January 10, 2020

Singles from Rare (Deluxe)
- 1. "Boyfriend" Released: April 9, 2020

Rare is the third solo studio album by American singer Selena Gomez, released by Interscope Records on January 10, 2020. As the executive producer, she worked with various producers, including Ian Kirkpatrick, Jason Evigan, Mattman & Robin, Sir Nolan, Simon Says, The Monsters & Strangerz and David Pramik.

Rare is a midtempo pop and dance-pop record, taking cues from electronic, Latin pop and R&B styles. Lyrically, the album explores themes of self-love, self-empowerment, self-acceptance, and self-worth. Guest features on Rare are from singer 6lack and rapper Kid Cudi. The album was promoted by two singles prior to its release: The lead single "Lose You to Love Me" which topped the US Billboard Hot 100 and became Gomez's first number-one single in the country. "Look at Her Now" peaked at number 27 on the chart, while the title track reached at number 30 on the Hot 100.

Rare received positive reviews from music critics, who praised its production and cohesiveness, with many calling it Gomez's best album to date. The album debuted at number one in Argentina, Australia, Belgium, Canada, Estonia, Lithuania, Mexico, Norway, Portugal, Scotland, and the United States. Rare has since been certified platinum by the Recording Industry Association of America (RIAA) for sales of over 1 million equivalent units in the United States.

A Target-exclusive edition of Rare additionally includes five of Gomez's standalone singles released in 2017–2018: "Bad Liar", "Fetish" featuring Gucci Mane, "It Ain't Me" with Kygo, "Back to You", and "Wolves" with Marshmello. The vinyl edition of Rare adds "Feel Me" as a bonus track. A deluxe edition with three new tracks, including the single "Boyfriend", was released on April 9, 2020.

== Background and release ==
Speaking in a November 2019 interview for Apple Music on the subject of her then upcoming studio album, Gomez admitted that the unreleased tracks were where she currently was. She also said that the songs on the tracklist went well with each other, after putting them in order. Gomez appeared on the radio program On Air with Ryan Seacrest and stated that she had "a million ideas and it's just going to be cooler and it's going to be stronger and it's going to be better." She stated on The Tonight Show Starring Jimmy Fallon that the album would have a "sense of strong pop", and that she experimented with electric guitar. According to Gomez, it took her "four years now to even feel at a good place with this album".

Rare was one of 2020's three most-searched albums on Google, collecting 1.2 million monthly searches; the other two are Taylor Swift's Folklore and J Balvin's Colores. The deluxe edition with three new tracks was released on April 9, 2020, including the single "Boyfriend".

== Music and lyrics ==
Rare is primarily a pop and dance-pop record with a dark tone, deriving elements from various musical styles, such as R&B, electro, funk-pop, reggaeton, alternative pop and electronic music. The main themes are of "love, loss and dating". Gomez herself stated that the album is "honest, empowering and uplifting", while its main messages are "self-love, acceptance and empowerment". She also added that the songs on Rare are "the most honest music I've ever made".

=== Songs ===
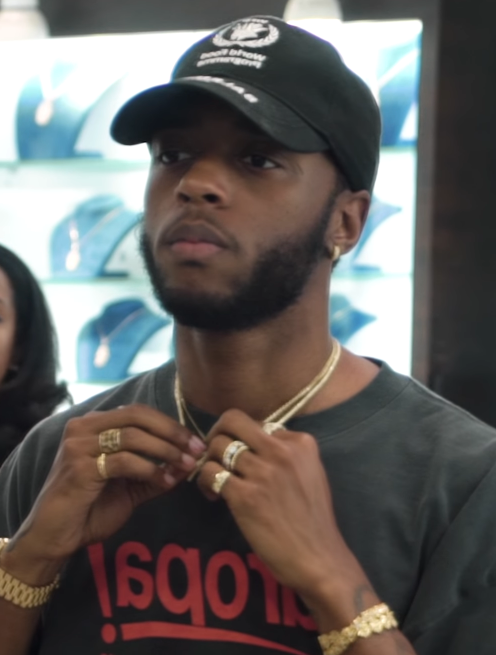
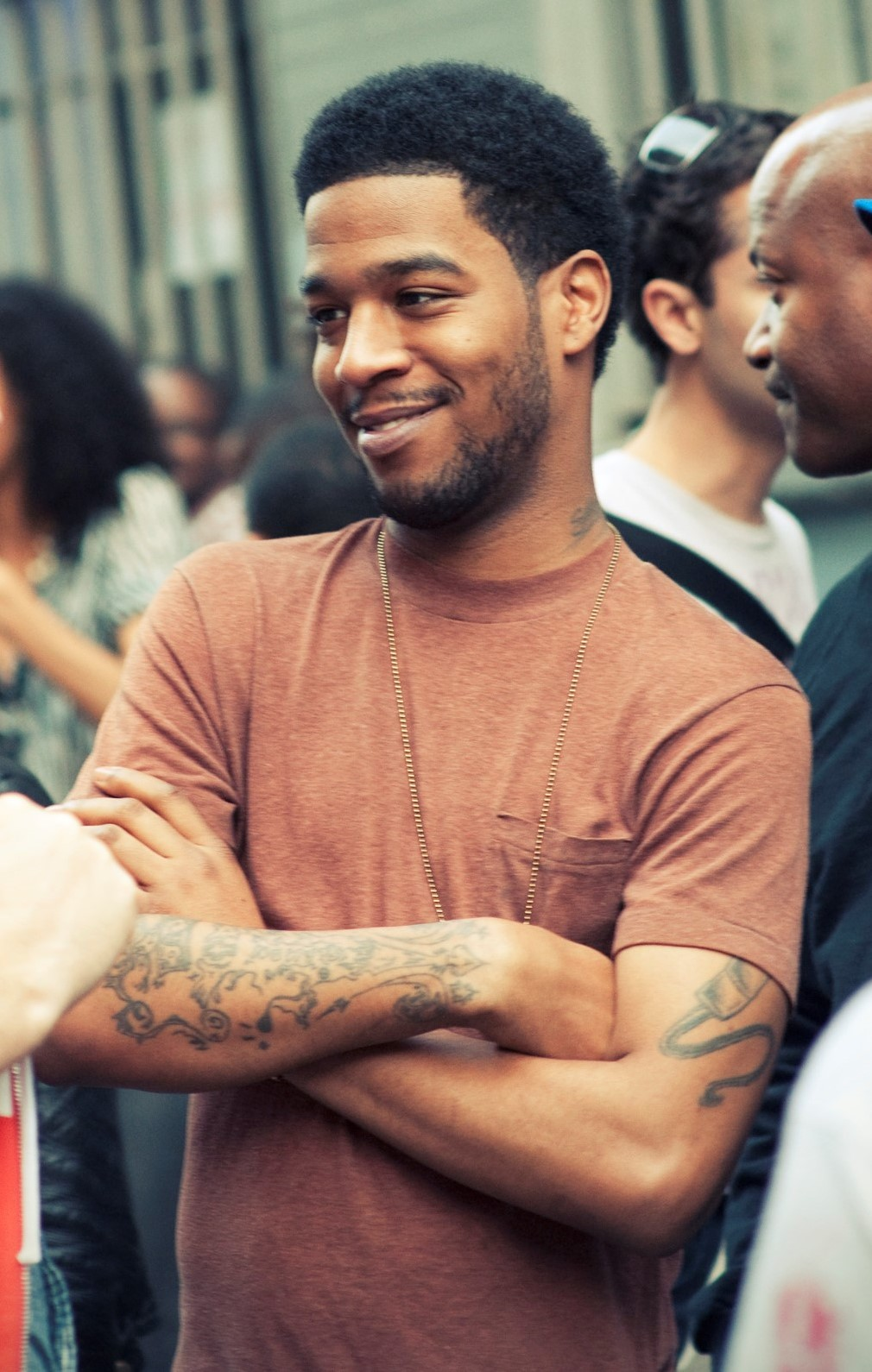
Rare contains two collaborations: The ninth track "Crowded Room" features singer 6lack (left) in the song's bridge, while the thirteenth track "A Sweeter Place" features rapper Kid Cudi (right) in the second verse and outro.

The standard edition of Rare contains 13 tracks. The opener and title track is a "quiet but impactful self-love anthem" with lyrics discussing "the wavering interests of a lover" and the singer realizing "her love interest isn't valuing her in the way she deserves". Its sound has been referred to as "backing vocals and instrumentals muffled as if the whole thing has been dunked underwater". The following track, "Dance Again", is a blend of multiple genres, including funk, dance, electro, and electropop. It encompasses an "infectious" and "mellifluous" melody, "Cure-like" bass, "fuzzy" synths and a "walloping disco bassline". It has been described as "lite-Daft Punk" and "low-key yet deeply infectious". Co-written with Julia Michaels and Justin Tranter, "Look at Her Now" is an upbeat dance-pop and electropop track which explores "being better off without the bad ones" and getting over the end of a relationship. The fourth song, "Lose You to Love Me", is the only ballad on Rare. Its "bare-bones" production incorporates "plucked" violins, "booming" bass, "tearjerker" piano, an orchestra, and "multi-tracked Gomez voices cascading against each other". The song is about self-love and finding out one's true self while losing a lover in the process. Critics speculated that it may reference about Gomez's relationship with Justin Bieber. The Latin-infused "Ring", which deals with "toying with noncommittal lovers", drew comparisons to the works of Camila Cabello (namely her 2017 hit single "Havana"), Gotye's "Somebody That I Used to Know", as well as Santana's "Smooth". Produced by the Monsters & Strangerz with Jon Bellion, "Vulnerable" is a "warm" disco and electropop record with a "moody synth groove" and elements of italo disco and tropical house.

Influences of Latin music are also present on the upbeat and "dancefloor-ready" "Let Me Get Me". The first of Rare's two collaborations, "Crowded Room", is an R&B song which features singer 6lack. Tracks 10, 11, and 12 all have a funk sound. "Kinda Crazy" is a "tongue-in-cheek tune" and "sinuous kiss-off" driven by a "clean bluesy guitar lick and accompanying horns". "Cut You Off" is a "slinky" funk-inflected downtempo pop song and a slow jam about "saying goodbye to a relationship that's dragging you down". It has been compared to the works of Taylor Swift. Rare concludes with "A Sweeter Place": A collaboration with rapper Kid Cudi, the song "documents the life lessons [Gomez] has learned and expresses hope that brighter days lie ahead". The vinyl and digital bonus track editions of Rare feature the song "Feel Me", which was previously featured on the setlist of Gomez's 2016 Revival Tour. Gomez released the song on digital platforms on February 21, 2020, the day of the vinyl release.

== Promotion ==
The album and its title were first announced on Gomez's Instagram page, where she revealed the cover art and included a snippet of the title track.

The standard edition of the studio album was promoted and preceded by the release of "Lose You to Love Me" released October 23, 2019, and "Look at Her Now" on October 24, 2019. On November 24, 2019, Gomez performed "Lose You to Love Me" and "Look at Her Now" at the 2019 American Music Awards to promote the album. The title track was released as the second single the same day the album came out. Gomez also appeared on The Tonight Show Starring Jimmy Fallon, The Ellen Degeneres Show, and The Kelly Clarkson Show to promote the album.

In addition, "Dance Again" was scheduled to be used to promote CBS Sports and Turner Sports' coverage of the 2020 NCAA tournament. However, the song was never used, as the event was canceled over concerns of the COVID-19 pandemic. A part of the proceeds from "Dance Again" went toward the MusiCares COVID-19 Relief Fund. A performance video of the track was posted on YouTube on March 26, 2020.

== Critical reception ==
Professional ratings
Aggregate scores
Source	Rating
AnyDecentMusic?	6.7/10
Metacritic	76/100
Review scores
Source	Rating
AllMusic	4/5 stars
Consequence of sound	B−
Entertainment Weekly	B+
The Independent	3/5 stars
MusicOMH	4/5 stars
NME	3/5 stars
Pitchfork	6.8/10
Rolling Stone	4/5 stars
Slant Magazine	3/5 stars
Tom Hull – on the Web	B+

Rare received positive reviews from music critics. At Metacritic, which assigns a normalized rating out of 100 to reviews from mainstream critics, the album has an average score of 76 based on 12 reviews, indicating "generally favorable reviews".

Jem Aswad of Variety labeled Rare "one of the best pop albums to be released in recent memory" and described it as "sophisticated, precisely written and expertly produced music". While calling it "shockingly, and beautifully, upbeat", Brittany Spanos of Rolling Stone opined that the album is "an act of divine ruthlessness, full of dance-y, mid-tempo clarity". Writing for NME, Rhian Daly called the album "a beautifully confident return from one of pop's most underrated stars, and a quietly defiant wrestling back of the narrative surrounding her", while Leah Greenblatt of Entertainment Weekly praised the album's "lightness" despite its "heavy messaging".

Mikael Wood of the Los Angeles Times named Rare as Gomez's "most meaningful solo disc" and opined that it embraces "an infectious spirit of adventure". Similarly, Vulture's Craig Jenkins wrote that the album is "almost inarguably Selena Gomez's best album". In a mixed review, Pitchfork's Quinn Moreland stated that the album was her "most cohesive record to date" but that "[Gomez's] introspection can only go so deep when it's paired with sleek, easy songwriting that lets her slip by". In concurrence, Alexandra Pollard of The Independent gave the album three stars out of five, deeming it "an accomplished, coherent record, with moments of ecstasy and others of pathos" but concluding that it "never quite gets out from beneath the shadow of half a decade of behemothic bangers".

Idolator listed Rare among the 20 best pop albums of 2020, for being an "extraordinarily accomplished pop album that tackles serious issues like self worth and mental health" while complimenting "Lose You to Love Me" as a "Grammy-worthy ballad"; the tracks "Vulnerable", "Ring", "People You Know" and "A Sweeter Place" were highlighted as the "delights" from the album.

=== Year-end lists ===
Rare was featured on several year-end list of best albums. It was listed at number 30 on Uproxx's "The Best Albums of 2020" list, with the editors commenting "Coming into her adulthood necessarily meant facing down those two demons, and she does it with idiosyncratic lyrics, outstanding vocal performances, and earworm hooks." Rolling Stone ranked it at number 24 on "The Best Albums of 2020" list, with Julia Childing stating that "it's cathartic to hear Gomez dump out the bad years like they're just burned toast". The publication also listed "Cut You Off", a song from the album as the 19th best song of 2020. Billboard listed the title track as one of the best pop songs of 2020.

Year-end lists
Publication	List	Rank	Ref.
AllMusic	Favorite Pop Albums of 2020	—N/a	
Billboard	The 50 Best Albums of 2020	22	
Billboard	The 25 Best Pop Albums of 2020	—N/a	
The Guardian	The 50 Best Albums of 2020	45	
The Guardian	Alim Kheraj's Best Albums of 2020	—N/a	
The Guardian	Kate Solomon's Best Albums of 2020	—N/a	
Metro	The Best Albums of 2020	—N/a	
NYLON	Top Albums of 2020	—N/a	
People	The Best Albums of 2020	5	
PopSugar	Best Albums of 2020	33	
Rolling Stone	The 50 Best Albums of 2020	24	
Uproxx	The Best Albums of 2020	30	
Uproxx	The Best Pop Albums of 2020	7	

UMI Yearlies named Rare album of the year in 2020.

== Commercial performance ==
In the United States, Rare debuted at number one on the US Billboard 200, earning 112,000 album-equivalent units (including 53,000 copies as pure album sales) in its first week. This became Gomez's third US number-one debut and the first album released in the 2020s to top the chart. The album also accumulated a total of 79.3 million on-demand streams for album's tracks that week. In its second week, the album dropped to number six on the chart, earning an additional 38,000 units. As of December 2020, the album has earned 703,000 album-equivalent units in the US, according to Nielsen Music/MRC Data. In July 2021, Rare had sold 123,000 pure copies in the US.

In the United Kingdom, the album debuted at number two on the UK Albums Chart earning 17,661 album-equivalent units in its first week. It became her highest-peaking album in the country and also her longest-charting one, spending 26 weeks on the chart. It was eventually certified gold by the British Phonographic Industry (BPI) in April 2021 for sales of 100,000 album units, making it Gomez's first album to do. In Australia, the album debuted at number one on the ARIA Top 100 Albums Chart, becoming Gomez's first number-one debut in the country. It also became her first number-one album in Argentina, Belgium (Flanders), Lithuania, Portugal and Scotland.

== Track listing ==
=== Standard edition ===
Rare track listing
No.	Title	Lyrics	Music	Producer(s)	Length
1.	"Rare"	Madison Love; Brett McLaughlin	Selena Gomez; Nolan Lambroza; Simon Rosen	Sir Nolan^{[a]}; Simon Says^{[a]}	3:40
2.	"Dance Again"	Gomez; Justin Tranter; Caroline Ailin	Mattias Larsson; Robin Fredriksson	Mattman & Robin^{[a]}; Bart Schoudel^{[b]}	2:50
3.	"Look at Her Now"	Gomez; Julia Michaels	Tranter; Ian Kirkpatrick	Kirkpatrick^{[a]}; Schoudel^{[b]}	2:42
4.	"Lose You to Love Me"	Gomez; Michaels	Tranter; Larsson; Fredriksson	Mattman & Robin^{[a]}; Schoudel^{[b]}; Finneas^{[c]}	3:26
5.	"Ring"	Sean Douglas; Julie Frost	Gomez; Breyan Isaac; David Ciente; Lambroza	Schoudel^{[b]}; Sir Nolan^{[b]}^{[d]}; Johan Lenox^{[c]}; Simon Says^{[c]}; Douglas^{[d]}	2:28
6.	"Vulnerable"	Gomez; Amy Allen	Jonathan Bellion; Jordan Johnson; Stefan Johnson	The Monsters & Strangerz; Bellion; Schoudel^{[b]}; Gian Stone^{[e]}	3:12
7.	"People You Know"	Steph Jones; Aaron Puckett	Gomez; Mathieu Jomphe; Alex Hope; Jason Evigan	Evigan; Schoudel^{[b]}; Billboard^{[d]}; Hope^{[d]}	3:14
8.	"Let Me Get Me"	Gomez; Tranter; Ailin	Larsson; Fredriksson	Mattman & Robin^{[a]}; Schoudel^{[b]}	3:09
9.	"Crowded Room" (with 6lack)	Bebe Rexha; Simon Wilcox; Ricardo Valentine	Gomez; Lambroza; Rosen	Sir Nolan^{[a]}; Simon Says^{[a]}; Benjamin Rice^{[b]}	3:06
10.	"Kinda Crazy"	Tranter; Jasmine Thompson	Gomez; Rami Yacoub; Albin Nedler; Kristoffer Fogelmark	Nedler; Fogelmark; Yacoub; Rice^{[b]}; Schoudel^{[b]}	3:32
11.	"Fun"	Michaels; Scott Harris	Gomez; Raul Cubina; Mark Williams	Ojivolta; Schoudel^{[b]}	3:09
12.	"Cut You Off"	Liza Owen; Chloe Angelides	Gomez; David Pramik	Pramik; Rice^{[b]}	3:02
13.	"A Sweeter Place" (featuring Kid Cudi)	Scott Mescudi; Love; Uzoechi Emenike	Gomez; Kirkpatrick	Kid Cudi; Mike Dean^{[d]}; Patrick Reynolds^{[d]}; Oladipo Omishore^{[d]}; Kirkpatrick^{[d]}	4:23
Total length:					41:59

=== Deluxe edition ===
Rare (Deluxe) track listing
No.	Title	Writer(s)	Producer(s)	Length
1.	"Boyfriend"	Gomez; Michaels; Tranter; Wienner; Homaee	The Roommates^{[a]}; Schoudel^{[b]}	2:41
2.	"Lose You to Love Me"			3:26
3.	"Rare"			3:40
4.	"Souvenir"	Gomez; Love; Douglas; Kirkpatrick	Kirkpatrick^{[a]}; Rice^{[b]}	2:41
5.	"Look at Her Now"			2:42
6.	"She"	Gomez; Tranter; Emenike; Wienner; Homaee	The Roommates^{[a]}	2:52
7.	"Crowded Room" (with 6lack)			3:06
8.	"Vulnerable"			3:12
9.	"Dance Again"			2:50
10.	"Ring"			2:28
11.	"A Sweeter Place" (featuring Kid Cudi)			4:23
12.	"People You Know"			3:14
13.	"Cut You Off"			3:02
14.	"Let Me Get Me"			3:09
15.	"Kinda Crazy"			3:32
16.	"Fun"			3:09
17.	"Feel Me"	Jacob Kasher; Ammar Malik; Ross Golan; Lisa Scinta	Phil Phever; McKenzie; Mills	3:46
Total length:				53:55

=== Notes ===
- ^{^[a]} signifies a producer and vocal producer
- ^{^[b]} signifies a vocal producer
- ^{^[c]} signifies an additional producer
- ^{^[d]} signifies a co-producer
- ^{^[e]} signifies an additional vocal producer
- "Feel Me" was initially added in the vinyl standard edition as a bonus track.
- Target-exclusive standard edition includes the five standalone singles "Bad Liar", "Fetish" featuring Gucci Mane, "It Ain't Me" with Kygo, "Back to You", and "Wolves" with Marshmello.
- Japanese limited edition includes a bonus DVD which features the behind the scenes, and music videos of "Lose You to Love Me", and "Look at Her Now".
- Japanese special edition features the standard edition track listing order and includes all the bonus tracks from the deluxe edition at the end of the album. Additionally, it comes with a bonus DVD, offering exclusive behind the scenes footage, the music video, and a live performance from the Village Studio of "Rare", the performance video of "Dance Again", the live performance from the Revival Tour of "Feel Me", and the music video of "Boyfriend".
- Fifth anniversary edition CDs include an exclusive snippet of "Sunset Blvd", with Benny Blanco, from their 2025 collaborative album I Said I Love You First.

== Credits and personnel ==
Credits were adapted from the liner notes.

=== Recording locations ===
- Home Away from Home Studios (Los Angeles, CA)
- MXM Studios (Los Angeles, CA)
- Interscope Studios (Santa Monica, CA)
- House Mouse Studios (Stockholm, Sweden)
- Costa Mesa Recording Studios (Newport, CA)
- Westlake Studios (West Hollywood, CA)
- Chalice Recording (Hollywood, CA)
- Chumba Meadows (Tarzana, CA)
- EastWest Studios (Hollywood, CA)
- Studio at the Palms (Las Vegas, NV)
- No Excuses Studios (Santa Monica, CA)
- Hydde Studios (Encino, CA)
- Big Noize Studio (Hollywood, CA)
- The Hit Factory (Miami, FL)
- Zenseven Studios (Tarzana, CA)
- Conway Recording Studios (Los Angeles, CA)
- PMD Recording Studios (Los Angeles, CA)
- The Village (Santa Monica, CA)

=== Vocals ===
- Selena Gomez – lead vocals (all tracks), backing vocals (1)
- 6lack – featured vocals (9)
- Kid Cudi – featured vocals, backing vocals (13)
- Caroline Ailin – backing vocals (2, 8)
- Amy Allen – backing vocals (6)
- Chloe Angelides – backing vocals (12)
- Jon Bellion – backing vocals (6)
- Jason Evigan – backing vocals (7)
- Steph Jones – backing vocals (7)
- Ian Kirkpatrick – backing vocals (13)
- Madison Love – backing vocals (1, 13)
- Mattman & Robin – backing vocals, choir vocals (4)
- MNEK – backing vocals (13)
- Julia Michaels – backing vocals (3, 4, 11), choir vocals (4)
- Liza Owen – backing vocals (12)
- Henry Oyekanmi – backing vocals (5)
- David Pramik – backing vocals (12)
- Avena Savage – backing vocals (12)
- Jasmine Thompson – backing vocals (10)
- Justin Tranter – backing vocals, choir vocals (4)
- Mark Williams – backing vocals (11)

=== Instrumentation ===
- Jon Bellion – instrumentation (6)
- Billboard – instrumentation (7)
- Carl Bodell – trumpet (10)
- David Bukovinszky – cello (4)
- Mattais Bylund – string synthesizer, string arrangement, string editing, string recording (4)
- Kid Cudi – instrumentation (13)
- Mike Dean – instrumentation (13)
- Jason Evigan – instrumentation (7)
- Jake Faun – instrumentation (1), guitar (5)
- Finneas – percussion, synths, strings, bass guitar (4)
- Kristoffer Fogelmark – keyboards, drums, instrumentation, guitar, bass (10)
- Alex Hope – instrumentation (7)
- Mattias Johansson – violin (4)
- Ian Kirkpatrick – instrumentation (3, 13)
- Johan Lenox – string composition, string arrangement (5)
- Mattman & Robin – drums (2, 8), guitar (2), percussion, bass (2, 4, 8), piano, synths (2, 4), 808, organ, strings (4), keyboards, claps, harp (8)
- Albin Nedler – keyboards, drums, instrumentation, guitar (10)
- Sir Nolan – instrumentation (1, 9), percussion (5)
- Oladipo Omishore – instrumentation (13)
- Henry Oyekanmi – percussion (5)
- David Pramik – instrumentation, Fender Stratocaster, Gibson Les Paul (12)
- Patrick Reynolds – instrumentation (13)
- Simon Says – instrumentation (1)
- The Monsters & Strangerz – instrumentation (6)
- Mark Williams – instrumentation (11)
- Rami Yacoub – keyboards, drums, instrumentation (10)

=== Production ===
- Selena Gomez – executive production
- Jon Bellion – production (6)
- Kid Cudi – production (13)
- Sean Douglas – production (5)
- Jason Evigan – production (7)
- Kristoffer Fogelmark – production (10)
- Ian Kirkpatrick – production, vocal production (3), co-production (13)
- Mattman & Robin – production, vocal production (2, 4, 8)
- Albin Nedler – production (10)
- Sir Nolan – production, vocal production (1, 5, 9)
- Dante Hemingway – co-production, vocal production (1, 4)
- Ojivolta – production (11)
- David Pramik – production (12)
- Simon Says – production, vocal production (1), additional production (5)
- The Monsters & Strangerz – production (6)
- Rami Yacoub – production (10)
- Finneas – additional production (4)
- Johan Lenox – additional production (5)
- Billboard – co-production (7)
- Mike Dean – co-production (13)
- Alex Hope – co-production (7)
- Oladipo Omishore – co-production (13)
- Patrick Reynolds – co-production (13)
- Benjamin Rice – vocal production (9–10, 12)
- Bart Schoudel – vocal production (2–4, 6–8, 10–11)
- Gian Stone – additional vocal production (6)

=== Technical ===
- Cory Bice – engineering (2, 8)
- Raul Cubina – engineering, programming (11)
- Ryan Dulude – engineering (8), assistant engineering (4)
- Rafael "Come2Brazil" Fadul – engineering (7)
- John Hanes – engineering (2, 6, 8), mix engineering (4)
- Sam Holland – engineering (8)
- Stefan Johnson – engineering (6)
- Ian Kirkpatrick – engineering (3, 13)
- Jeremy Lertola – engineering (2, 8)
- Mattman & Robin – engineering (4), programming (2, 4, 8)
- Sir Nolan – engineering (1, 5, 9), programming (5)
- David Pramik – engineering (12)
- Benjamin Rice – engineering (1, 9–10, 12)
- Simon Says – engineering (1)
- Bart Schoudel – engineering (1–8, 10–11, 13)
- William J. Sullivan – engineering (13)
- Mark Williams – engineering, programming (11)
- Bo Bodnar – assistant engineering (13)
- Andrew Boyd – assistant engineering (3, 6, 8, 10–11, 13)
- Kevin Brunhober – assistant engineering (2, 5, 7–8, 11, 13)
- Lionel Crasta – assistant engineering (7)
- Gavin Finn – assistant engineering (4)
- Chris Kahn – assistant engineering (13)
- Sedrick Moore II – assistant engineering (3, 12)
- Mick Raskin – assistant engineering (2, 7, 10)
- Jeremy Tomlinson – assistant engineering (5)
- Finneas – programming (4)
- Kristoffer Fogelmark – programming (10)
- Albin Nedler – programming (10)
- Rami Yacoub – programming (10)
- Ben Dotson – post production vocal and sound editing (11)
- Jon Castelli – mixing (11)
- Serban Ghenea – mixing (2, 4, 6, 8)
- Manny Marroquin – mixing (3, 9)
- Tony Maserati – mixing (1, 5, 7, 10, 12–13)
- Miles Comaskey – mix engineering (1), assistant mix engineering (10, 12)
- Josh Deguzman – mix engineering (11)
- Chris Galland – mix engineering (3)
- Scott Desmarais – assistant mix engineering (3)
- Robin Florent – assistant mix engineering (3)
- Jeremie Inhaber – assistant mix engineering (3)
- Najeeb Jones – assistant mix engineering (5, 7)
- David Kim – assistant mix engineering (9, 13)
- Dale Becker – mastering (11)
- Chris Gehringer – mastering (1–10, 12–13)
- Will Quinnell – mastering (2–10, 12–13)

=== Design ===
- Petra Collins – photography
- Max Angles – design
- Dina Hovsepian – art direction

== Charts ==
=== Weekly charts ===
Sales chart performance for Rare
Chart (2020)	Peak position
Argentine Albums (CAPIF)	1
Australian Albums (ARIA)	1
Austrian Albums (Ö3 Austria)	3
Belgian Albums (Ultratop Flanders)	1
Belgian Albums (Ultratop Wallonia)	3
Canadian Albums (Billboard)	1
Czech Albums (ČNS IFPI)	2
Danish Albums (Hitlisten)	5
Dutch Albums (Album Top 100)	2
Estonian Albums (Eesti Ekspress)	1
Finnish Albums (Suomen virallinen lista)	5
French Albums (SNEP)	6
German Albums (Offizielle Top 100)	3
Greek Albums (IFPI)	3
Hungarian Albums (MAHASZ)	28
Irish Albums (Official Charts)	4
Italian Albums (FIMI)	6
Japan Hot Albums (Billboard Japan)	30
Japanese Albums (Oricon)	20
Lithuanian Albums (AGATA)	1
Mexican Albums (AMPROFON)	1
New Zealand Albums (RMNZ)	2
Norwegian Albums (VG-lista)	1
Polish Albums (ZPAV)	3
Portuguese Albums (AFP)	1
Scottish Albums (Official Charts)	1
Slovak Albums (ČNS IFPI)	2
Spanish Albums (PROMUSICAE)	3
Swedish Albums (Sverigetopplistan)	7
Swiss Albums (Schweizer Hitparade)	3
Swiss Albums (Romandie)	2
UK Albums (Official Charts)	2
US Billboard 200	1

=== Year-end charts ===
2020 year-end chart performance for Rare
Chart (2020)	Position
Belgian Albums (Ultratop Flanders)	60
Belgian Albums (Ultratop Wallonia)	128
Danish Albums (Hitlisten)	73
Dutch Albums (Album Top 100)	70
French Albums (SNEP)	184
Irish Albums (IRMA)	36
Norwegian Albums (VG-lista)	14
Portuguese Albums (AFP)	100
Spanish Albums (PROMUSICAE)	84
UK Albums (OCC)	55
US Billboard 200	101
US Rolling Stone 200	62
US Top Current Album Sales (Billboard)	45

== Certifications ==
Region	Certification	Certified units/sales
Austria (IFPI Austria)	Gold	7,500^{‡}
Brazil (Pro-Música Brasil) Deluxe	3× Platinum	120,000^{‡}
Denmark (IFPI Danmark)	Platinum	20,000^{‡}
France (SNEP)	Platinum	100,000^{‡}
New Zealand (RMNZ)	Platinum	15,000^{‡}
Norway (IFPI Norway)	Platinum	20,000^{‡}
Poland (ZPAV)	Platinum	20,000^{‡}
Singapore (RIAS)	Gold	5,000^{*}
United Kingdom (BPI)	Gold	100,000^{‡}
United States (RIAA)	Platinum	1,000,000^{‡}
^{*} Sales figures based on certification alone.^{‡} Sales+streaming figures based on certification alone.

== Release history ==
Release dates and formats for Rare
Region	Date	Version	Format	Label	Ref.
Various	January 10, 2020	Standard	CD; cassette; digital download; streaming	Interscope	
United States	January 10, 2020	Target/Japanese	CD	Interscope	
Japan	January 22, 2020	Target/Japanese	CD; CD+DVD	Universal	
Various	February 21, 2020	Bonus track	Vinyl	Interscope	
Various	February 28, 2020	Bonus track	Digital download; streaming	Interscope	
Various	April 9, 2020	Deluxe edition	CD; Digital download; streaming	Interscope	
Japan	July 22, 2020	Special edition	CD+DVD	Universal	

== See also ==
- List of 2020 albums
- List of Billboard 200 number-one albums of 2020
- List of number-one albums of 2020 (Australia)
- List of number-one albums of 2020 (Belgium)
- List of number-one albums of 2020 (Canada)
- List of number-one albums of 2020 (Mexico)
- List of number-one albums of 2020 (Norway)
- List of number-one albums of 2020 (Portugal)
- List of number-one albums of 2020 (Scotland)
- List of UK top-ten albums in 2020
