= Boyfriend (Selena Gomez song) =

2020 single by Selena Gomez

Single by Selena Gomez

from the album Rare (Deluxe)
- Released: April 9, 2020
- Recorded: November 19, 2019
- Studio: EastWest Studios (Los Angeles, CA); Interscope Studios (Santa Monica, CA); PMD Recording Studios (Los Angeles, CA)
- Genre: Electropop; house
- Length: 2:41
- Label: Interscope
- Songwriters: Selena Gomez; Julia Michaels; Justin Tranter; Jon Wienner; Sam Homaee
- Producer: The Roommates

Selena Gomez singles chronology
"Rare" (2020)	"Boyfriend" (2020)	"Past Life" (2020)

Music video
- "Boyfriend" on YouTube

"Boyfriend" is a song by American singer Selena Gomez, included on the deluxe edition of her third studio album Rare (2020). The song was released as the album's fourth and final single overall on April 9, 2020.

== Background ==
Gomez wrote "Boyfriend" after having a text message conversation with co-writer Julia Michaels. "I want a boyfriend" was the original title of the song. Gomez first revealed the song in an interview on The Tonight Show Starring Jimmy Fallon on January 14, 2020, where she said it was an unreleased song from Rare. She later announced the song would appear on the deluxe edition of Rare on April 6, 2020. The next day she teased the song's lyrics "There's a difference between a want and a need. Some nights I just want more than me" on social media. She wrote about the song's background saying:

Many of you know how excited I have been to release a song called 'Boyfriend.' It's a lighthearted song about falling down and getting back up time and time again in love, but also knowing that you don't need anyone other than yourself to be happy. We wrote it long before our current crisis, but in the context of today, I want to be clear that a boyfriend is nowhere near the top of my list of priorities. Just like the rest of the world, I'm praying for safety, unity and recovery during this pandemic.

== Composition ==
The song features a house beat and an electropop pre-chorus. In terms of music notation, "Boyfriend" was composed using 4/4 common time, with a tempo of 92 beats per minute. Gomez's vocal range spans from the low note of G♯_{3} to the high note of E_{5}.

== Music videos ==
The official music video premiered on YouTube on April 10, 2020. It features Gomez meeting boys in choosing who will be her new lover, but she realizes the boys are not sincere. Hence, Gomez uses magic perfume that transforms the boys into frogs and then puts them into a small cage and takes the boys who are turned into frogs with her to the car. It was directed by Matty Peacock. The video was nominated for Best Art Direction at the 2020 MTV Video Music Awards. Billboard named it one of the best music videos of 2020.

=== Doll version ===
A doll music video for the song, directed by a fan, was released on April 29, 2020.

== Credits and personnel ==
Credits adapted from Tidal.

- Selena Gomez – vocals, songwriting
- The Roommates – production, vocal production, percussion
- Julia Michaels – songwriting, backing vocals
- Justin Tranter – songwriting
- Jon Wienner – songwriting, recording, studio personnel
- Sam Homaee – songwriting, synthesizer
- Dante Hemingway - mix engineer, vocal production
- Bart Schoudel – vocal production
- Will Quinnell – assistant mastering engineer, studio personnel
- Chris Gehringer – mastering, studio personnel
- Miles Comaskey – mix engineer, studio personnel
- Tony Maserati – mixing, studio personnel

== Charts ==
Chart performance for "Boyfriend"
Chart (2020)	Peak position
Australia (ARIA)	54
Austria (Ö3 Austria Top 40)	60
Belgium (Ultratip Bubbling Under Flanders)	41
Belgium (Ultratip Bubbling Under Wallonia)	15
Canada Hot 100 (Billboard)	66
Czech Republic Singles Digital (ČNS IFPI)	59
Estonia (Eesti Ekspress)	36
France (SNEP)	159
Germany (GfK)	86
Greece (IFPI)	29
Hungary (Stream Top 40)	19
Ireland (IRMA)	35
Lithuania (AGATA)	22
Netherlands (Dutch Top 40 Tipparade)	17
Netherlands (Single Tip)	7
New Zealand Hot Singles (RMNZ)	1
Portugal (AFP)	68
Scottish Singles Sales (Official Charts)	60
Slovakia Singles Digital (ČNS IFPI)	38
Sweden Heatseeker (Sverigetopplistan)	3
Switzerland (Schweizer Hitparade)	63
UK Singles (Official Charts)	55
US Billboard Hot 100	59

== Certifications ==
Certifications and sales for "Boyfriend"
Region	Certification	Certified units/sales
Brazil (Pro-Música Brasil)	Platinum	40,000^{‡}
^{‡} Sales+streaming figures based on certification alone.

== Release history ==
Release dates and formats for "Boyfriend"
Region	Date	Format	Label	Ref.
Various	April 9, 2020	Digital download; streaming	Interscope	
Australia	April 13, 2020	Contemporary hit radio	Universal	
United Kingdom	April 17, 2020	Contemporary hit radio	Interscope	
Italy	May 1, 2020	Contemporary hit radio	Universal	
