= Back to You (Selena Gomez song) =

2018 single by Selena Gomez

Single by Selena Gomez

from the album 13 Reasons Why: Season 2 (Music from the Original TV Series)
- Released: May 10, 2018
- Studio: Zenseven Studios (Tarzana, CA); Westlake Recording Studios (Hollywood, CA); Conway Recording Studios (Los Angeles, CA)
- Genre: Dance-pop; electropop
- Length: 3:30
- Label: Interscope
- Songwriters: Parrish Warrington; Diederik Van Elsas; Amy Allen; Micah Premnath; Selena Gomez
- Producers: Trackside; Ian Kirkpatrick

Selena Gomez singles chronology
"Wolves" (2017)	"Back to You" (2018)	"Taki Taki" (2018)

Music video
- "Back to You" on YouTube

"Back to You" is a song by American singer Selena Gomez from the second season soundtrack to 13 Reasons Why (2018), a serialized television adaptation of the eponymous book. It appears as an international bonus track on her third studio album Rare (2020) and was written by Gomez, Parrish Warrington, Diederik Van Elsas, Amy Allen, and Micah Premnath. The production was handled by Ian Kirkpatrick and Trackside. It was released on May 10, 2018, as the second single from the soundtrack following the release of "Lovely" by Billie Eilish and Khalid.

Commercially, the song reached number one in Israel, the top five in Australia, Canada, the Czech Republic, Greece, Hungary, Ireland, Malaysia, the Netherlands, Poland, Singapore and Slovakia; the top ten in Belgium, Finland, New Zealand, Norway, Portugal and Scotland; as well as the top 20 in Denmark, Germany, Switzerland, Sweden, the United Kingdom and the United States. In the US, the song also became Gomez's 15th consecutive top 40 entry on the Billboard Hot 100, peaking at number 18.

== Background and release ==
Before its official announcement, the song was registered in ASCAP and teased by various US radio stations such as 104.7 KISS FM. Gomez finally confirmed the release through social media on May 1, as well as its inclusion on the soundtrack of the second season of the Netflix's original series 13 Reasons Why, in which she takes part as an executive producer. The song premiered on May 10 in Zane Lowe's Apple Music radio show Beats 1 as the release day's "World Record". She was also interviewed by Lowe and confirmed that her third solo studio album was being completed.

== Composition ==
"Back to You" was written by Parrish Warrington, Diederik Van Elsas, Amy Allen, Micah Premnath, and Selena Gomez. The production was handled by Trackside and Ian Kirkpatrick, the latter also working on Gomez's previous single "Bad Liar". The track has been described as an emotional acoustic midtempo with country influences, being also called a "dance-pop anthem", as well as an electropop ballad. Gomez said that it was a "very special record" and that she wanted it to be "a beautiful message in a really complicated way but really fun".

The song is performed in the key of F♯ major with a tempo of 102 beats per minute in 4/4 time and follows a chord progression of D♯m–B–F♯. Gomez's vocal range spans two octaves, from C♯_{3} to C♯_{5}.

== Music video ==
A lyric video with scenes of the second season of 13 Reasons Why was released on May 10, 2018.

=== Release and synopsis ===
The official music video was directed by Scott Cudmore. The imagery for the music video is inspired from the 1965 French New Wave film Pierrot le Fou. The music video starts at a party with Gomez, dressed in a vintage feather-trimmed green sequined high-neck dress, locking eyes with a sharply suited man (Andrey Kupchenko), and they steal a convertible and end up frolicking in a bucolic pasture. Gomez wears an ensemble fit for the French countryside: a vintage white skirt and a sleeveless orange-and-yellow crop top. and take Gomez's twist on iconic ’60s French-girl style as some summer style inspiration.

Nevertheless, Gomez's video, is saturated with Godard's quintessential filmmaking quirks: fragmented editing; characters breaking the fourth wall; melodramatic dialogue; a garish, primary color-focused palette; and cartoonish neorealism. Cinemaphiles will immediately notice parallels, as the music video's opening visual directly mirrors the famous party scene in "Pierrot le Fou," both doused in deep, ever-changing colors. The inane dialogue from side characters serves to highlight the shallow, bourgeois lifestyle that Pierrot wants to escape from. The two find they are wanted and burn their car to destroy the evidence. The video returns to the party from the start and despite everything, Gomez cycles back, locks eyes with the sharply dressed man and asks: "Do you want to steal a car?".

== Accolades ==
Year	Ceremony	Award	Result	Ref
2018	Teen Choice Awards	Choice Summer Song	Won	
2018	People's Choice Awards	The Song Of 2018	Nominated	
2018	People's Choice Awards	The Music Video of 2018	Nominated	
2019	ASCAP Pop Music Awards	Winning Songs	Won	
2019	New Music Awards	Top40 Single of the Year	Nominated	
2019	BMI Pop Awards	Award-Winning Songs	Won	
2020	iHeartRadio Awards	Titanium Awards	Won	

== Track listing ==
- Digital download
1. "Back to You" – 3:30
- Riton and Kah-Lo remix
1. "Back to You" (Riton and Kah-Lo remix) – 3:27
- Joey Pecoraro remix
1. "Back to You" (Joey Pecoraro remix) – 3:46
- Anki Remix
1. "Back to You" (Anki remix) – 4:41

== Credits and personnel ==
Credits and personnel adapted from Rare album liner notes.

- Selena Gomez – lead vocals, songwriting
- Amy Allen – background vocals, songwriting
- Micah Premnath – background vocals, songwriting
- Parrish Warrington – songwriting
- Diederik Van Elsas – songwriting
- Ian Kirkpatrick – production

- Trackside – production
- Benjamin Rice – vocal production
- Tony Maserati – mixing
- Tyler Scott – mix engineering assistance
- Chris Gehringer – mastering

== Charts ==
=== Weekly charts ===
Chart (2018)	Peak position
Argentina Anglo (Monitor Latino)	8
Australia (ARIA)	4
Austria (Ö3 Austria Top 40)	8
Belgium (Ultratop 50 Flanders)	10
Belgium (Ultratop 50 Wallonia)	37
Bolivia (Monitor Latino)	18
Canada Hot 100 (Billboard)	4
Canada CHR/Top 40 (Billboard)	8
Canada Hot AC (Billboard)	7
CIS Airplay (TopHit)	137
Czech Republic Airplay (ČNS IFPI)	4
Czech Republic Singles Digital (ČNS IFPI)	3
Denmark (Tracklisten)	12
Finland (Suomen virallinen lista)	8
France (SNEP)	51
Germany (GfK)	19
Greece International Digital (IFPI)	5
Hungary (Rádiós Top 40)	5
Hungary (Single Top 40)	22
Hungary (Stream Top 40)	3
Ireland (IRMA)	4
Israel (Media Forest TV Airplay)	1
Italy (FIMI)	49
Japan Hot 100 (Billboard)	90
Japan Hot Overseas (Billboard)	8
Lebanon (Lebanese Top 20)	7
Lithuania (AGATA)	73
Malaysia (RIM)	3
Mexico (Mexico Airplay)	21
Mexico Ingles Airplay (Billboard)	21
Netherlands (Dutch Top 40)	5
Netherlands (Single Top 100)	5
New Zealand (Recorded Music NZ)	8
Norway (VG-lista)	10
Poland Airplay (ZPAV)	5
Portugal (AFP)	8
Scottish Singles Sales (Official Charts)	9
Singapore (RIAS)	3
Slovakia Airplay (ČNS IFPI)	53
Slovakia Singles Digital (ČNS IFPI)	2
Slovenia (SloTop50)	12
Spain (Promusicae)	44
Sweden (Sverigetopplistan)	14
Switzerland (Schweizer Hitparade)	20
UK Singles (Official Charts)	13
US Billboard Hot 100	18
US Adult Contemporary (Billboard)	14
US Adult Pop Airplay (Billboard)	5
US Dance Airplay (Billboard)	9
US Pop Airplay (Billboard)	4

=== Year-end charts ===
Chart (2018)	Position
Australia (ARIA)	58
Austria (Ö3 Austria Top 40)	46
Belgium (Ultratop Flanders)	25
Canada (Canadian Hot 100)	32
Denmark (Tracklisten)	82
Hungary (Rádiós Top 40)	82
Iceland (Plötutíóindi)	35
Netherlands (Dutch Top 40)	55
Netherlands (Single Top 100)	63
Poland (ZPAV)	38
Portugal (AFP)	93
Sweden (Sverigetopplistan)	74
Switzerland (Schweizer Hitparade)	100
US Billboard Hot 100	41
US Adult Contemporary (Billboard)	50
US Adult Top 40 (Billboard)	26
US Dance/Mix Show Airplay (Billboard)	41
US Mainstream Top 40 (Billboard)	10

== Certifications ==
Region	Certification	Certified units/sales
Australia (ARIA)	5× Platinum	350,000^{‡}
Austria (IFPI Austria)	Platinum	30,000^{‡}
Belgium (BRMA)	Gold	20,000^{‡}
Brazil (Pro-Música Brasil)	Diamond	160,000^{‡}
Denmark (IFPI Danmark)	Platinum	90,000^{‡}
Germany (BVMI)	Gold	200,000^{‡}
Italy (FIMI)	Gold	25,000^{‡}
Mexico (AMPROFON)	Platinum	60,000^{‡}
New Zealand (RMNZ)	3× Platinum	90,000^{‡}
Norway (IFPI Norway)	3× Platinum	180,000^{‡}
Poland (ZPAV)	3× Platinum	60,000^{‡}
Portugal (AFP)	Gold	5,000^{‡}
Spain (Promusicae)	Platinum	60,000^{‡}
United Kingdom (BPI)	Platinum	600,000^{‡}
United States (RIAA)	2× Platinum	2,000,000^{‡}
Streaming
Sweden (GLF)	Platinum	8,000,000^{†}
^{‡} Sales+streaming figures based on certification alone.^{†} Streaming-only figures based on certification alone.

== Release history ==
Region	Date	Format	Version	Label	Ref.
Various	May 10, 2018	Digital download; streaming	Original	Interscope	
United States	May 15, 2018	Contemporary hit radio	Original	Interscope	
Various	August 10, 2018	Digital download	Remixes	Interscope	
