= Dance Again (Selena Gomez song) =

2020 song by Selena Gomez

Song by Selena Gomez

from the album Rare
- Released: January 10, 2020
- Studio: MXM Studios (Los Angeles, California); Interscope Studios (Santa Monica, California); House Mouse Studios (Stockholm, Sweden)
- Genre: Dance; electropop; electro; funk
- Length: 2:50
- Label: Interscope
- Songwriters: Selena Gomez; Mattias Larsson; Robin Fredriksson; Justin Tranter; Caroline Ailin
- Producer: Mattman & Robin

Music video
- "Dance Again (Performance Video)" on YouTube

"Dance Again" is a song by American singer Selena Gomez from her third studio album Rare (2020), included as the second track on the standard version album and the ninth track on the deluxe version.

== Promotion ==
"Dance Again" was scheduled to be used to promote CBS Sports and Turner Sports' coverage of the 2020 NCAA tournament. However, the song was never used, as the tournament was cancelled over concerns of the COVID-19 pandemic. Gomez announced that a portion of the proceeds from "Dance Again" would go towards the MusiCares COVID-19 Relief Fund.

== Composition ==
"Dance Again" is a dance, electropop, electro, and funk song with influences of disco. In terms of music notation, it was composed in the key of D♭ minor with a tempo of 112 beats per minute.

== Music video ==
The song received a video titled "Dance Again (Performance Video)" which was directed by Craig Murray and released on March 26, 2020.

== Credits and personnel ==
Credits adapted from the liner notes of Rare.

=== Recording locations ===
- Recorded at MXM Studios (Los Angeles, California), Interscope Studios (Santa Monica, California) and House Mouse Studios (Stockholm, Sweden)
- Mixed at MixStar Studios (Virginia Beach, Virginia)
- Mastered at Sterling Sound (Edgewater, New Jersey)

=== Personnel ===
- Selena Gomez – lead vocals, songwriting
- Mattman & Robin – production for Wolf Cousins Productions, vocal production, programming, drums, bass, synths, piano, guitar, percussion
- Mattias Larsson – songwriting
- Robin Fredriksson – songwriting
- Justin Tranter – songwriting
- Caroline Ailin – songwriting, backing vocals
- Bart Schoudel – engineering, vocal production
- Cory Bice – engineering
- Jeremy Lertola – engineering
- John Hanes – engineering
- Kevin Brunhober – assisting
- Mick Raskin – assisting
- Serban Ghenea – mixing
- Chris Gehringer – mastering

== Charts ==
Chart performance for "Dance Again"
Chart (2020)	Peak position
Canada Hot 100 (Billboard)	96
CIS Airplay (TopHit)	14
New Zealand Hot Singles (RMNZ)	14
Portugal (AFP)	124
Russia Airplay (TopHit)	14
Slovakia Singles Digital (ČNS IFPI)	54
US Bubbling Under Hot 100 (Billboard)	19

=== Year-end charts ===
2020 year-end chart performance for "APT."
Chart (2020)	Position
CIS Airplay (TopHit)	166
Russia Airplay (TopHit)	164

== Release history ==
Release formats for "Dance Again"
Region	Date	Format	Label	Ref.
Various	January 10, 2020	Digital download; streaming	Interscope	
