= Look at Her Now =

2019 promotional single by Selena Gomez

Promotional single by Selena Gomez

from the album Rare
- A-side: "Lose You to Love Me"
- Released: October 24, 2019
- Recorded: August 1, 2019
- Studio: Interscope Studios (Santa Monica, California)
- Genre: Dance-pop; electropop; synth-pop
- Length: 2:42
- Label: Interscope
- Songwriters: Selena Gomez; Julia Michaels; Justin Tranter; Ian Kirkpatrick
- Producer: Ian Kirkpatrick

Music video
- "Look at Her Now" on YouTube

"Look at Her Now" is a song by American singer Selena Gomez. It was released on October 24, 2019, by Interscope Records as the first promotional single from her third studio album Rare (2020), a day after "Lose You to Love Me". In a social media post accompanying the release of the song, Gomez dedicated the track to her fans, stating: "And here’s my special gift to all of my ride or dies! I created this especially for you." The song was written by Gomez, Julia Michaels, Justin Tranter and its producer Ian Kirkpatrick. It has been described as a dance-pop, electropop and synth-pop song. The song reached the top ten in Greece, Latvia, and Slovakia, as well as the top forty in seventeen additional countries, including The United States, where it peaked at number 27. The song received widespread acclaim from music critics, with many praising its production and self-confidence message.

== Critical reception ==
The song received widespread acclaim from music critics. Madeline Roth from MTV News called the track a "fresh tune", and an "upbeat, danceable track that unabashedly celebrates her post-heartbreak bounce-back". Roth also wrote that the song was "her way of assuring fans, and herself, that she's moving on in stunning fashion". Writing for Entertainment Tonight, Zach Seemayer found that the lyrics "explores the confidence that can be regained when you find yourself after a split". In an article for Rolling Stone, Brittany Spanos described the song as an "upbeat, club-primed song" that "sounds like a part two to "Lose You to Love Me"". Chris Murphy, in an article by Vulture, saw Gomez as an "incredibly famous girl singing in the third person about getting over her incredibly famous ex-boyfriend". While quoting lyrics from the song, Murphy wrote that Gomez "has entered a new phase of her life. She’s now Selena 2.0". Lake Schatz from Consequence of Sound felt that the track "encourages self-love and perseverance". Alyssa Bailey from Elle wrote that the song was a "far more splashy take on a boy cheating on her". Mike Nied from Idolator wrote that Gomez "sings over simmering beats" while she "celebrates her perseverance after a devastating breakup". Nied also called the chorus "instantly hummable" and that it was "an absolute earworm that is bound to dominate radio for months to come". Writing for Paper Magazine, Michael Love Michael described the track as "confident" and that it was a "club-ready refresh, with an infectious 'mmm' chorus", and described the beat as "bouncy and "minimal". Tino Kolokathis from Elite Daily wrote that the chorus "gives fans major techno vibes", and called the song as a whole "empowering", and also wrote that the lyrics of the track "will have you saying, 'Yaaaas, girl!'".

Uproxx listed the song as one of the best songs of 2020.

== Commercial performance ==
After one day of tracking, the song debuted at number three on the US Billboard Bubbling Under Hot 100 Singles chart, and entered the US Billboard Hot 100 at number 27 a week after, earning her her eighteenth top-forty entry on the chart. That same week, the song debuted at number 26 in the UK and number 29 in Australia. The song entered the top 20 on charts in Canada, Ireland, Norway, Singapore, and Switzerland. It also debuted in the top 10 of Greece, Latvia and Slovakia.

== Music video ==
The music video, which was released the same day as the song, features Gomez and background dancers, dancing in a very colorful tent. Like the "Lose You to Love Me" music video, it was also fully shot on an iPhone 11 Pro, and was also directed by Sophie Muller. The video's aesthetic was inspired by early 2000s pop and R&B, specifically referencing music videos by Aaliyah, Britney Spears and Missy Elliott.

== Live performances ==
The song, along with "Lose You to Love Me" was first performed at the 2019 American Music Awards as the opening number on November 24, 2019.

== Credits and personnel ==
Credits adapted from the liner notes of Rare.

=== Recording locations ===
- Recorded at Interscope Studios (Santa Monica, California)
- Mixed at Larrabee Studios (North Hollywood, California)
- Mastered at Sterling Sound (Edgewater, New Jersey)

=== Personnel ===
- Selena Gomez – vocals, songwriter
- Julia Michaels – songwriter, backing vocals
- Justin Tranter – songwriter
- Ian Kirkpatrick – producer, songwriter, engineer, vocal producer, instrumentation
- Andrew Boyd – assistant recording engineer
- Sedrick Moore II – assistant recording engineer
- Bart Schoudel – engineer, vocal producer
- Chris Gehringer – mastering engineer
- Manny Marroquin – mixer
- Chris Galland – mix engineer
- Robin Florent – assistant mix engineer
- Scott Desmarais – assistant mix engineer
- Jeremie Inhaber – assistant mix engineer

== Charts ==
Chart performance for "Look at Her Now"
Chart (2019)	Peak position
Argentina (Argentina Hot 100)	91
Australia (ARIA)	29
Austria (Ö3 Austria Top 40)	26
Belgium (Ultratip Bubbling Under Flanders)	9
Belgium (Ultratip Bubbling Under Wallonia)	33
Canada Hot 100 (Billboard)	13
Colombia (National-Report)	88
Croatia (HRT)	93
Czech Republic Singles Digital (ČNS IFPI)	14
Estonia (Eesti Ekspress)	11
France (SNEP)	113
Germany (GfK)	43
Greece (IFPI)	6
Hungary (Single Top 40)	12
Hungary (Stream Top 40)	12
Ireland (IRMA)	15
Latvia (LAIPA)	7
Lithuania (AGATA)	12
Malaysia (RIM)	16
Netherlands (Single Top 100)	78
New Zealand (Recorded Music NZ)	23
Norway (VG-lista)	15
Portugal (AFP)	31
Romania (Airplay 100)	53
Scotland Singles (OCC)	44
Singapore (RIAS)	14
Slovakia Singles Digital (ČNS IFPI)	7
Spain (Promusicae)	71
Sweden (Sverigetopplistan)	53
Switzerland (Schweizer Hitparade)	20
UK Singles (OCC)	26
US Billboard Hot 100	27
US Rolling Stone Top 100	16
Venezuela Anglo (Record Report)	3
Venezuela Pop (Record Report)	17

== Certifications ==
Region	Certification	Certified units/sales
Australia (ARIA)	Platinum	70,000^{‡}
Brazil (Pro-Música Brasil)	3× Platinum	120,000^{‡}
New Zealand (RMNZ)	Gold	15,000^{‡}
Norway (IFPI Norway)	Gold	30,000^{‡}
Poland (ZPAV)	Gold	10,000^{‡}
Portugal (AFP)	Gold	5,000^{‡}
United Kingdom (BPI)	Silver	200,000^{‡}
^{‡} Sales+streaming figures based on certification alone.

== Release history ==
Region	Date	Format	Label	Ref.
Various	October 24, 2019	Digital download; streaming; 12-inch vinyl	Interscope	
