= Rare (Selena Gomez song) =

2020 single by Selena Gomez

- Live version artwork

Single by Selena Gomez

from the album Rare
- Released: January 10, 2020
- Recorded: November 2018
- Studio: Home Away From Home Studios (Los Angeles, California)
- Genre: Pop; electropop
- Length: 3:40
- Label: Interscope
- Songwriters: Selena Gomez; Madison Love; Brett McLaughlin; Nolan Lambroza; Simon Rosen
- Producers: Sir Nolan; Simon Says

Selena Gomez singles chronology
"Lose You to Love Me" (2019)	"Rare" (2020)	"Boyfriend" (2020)

Music video
- "Rare" on YouTube

"Rare" is a song by American singer Selena Gomez from her third studio album of the same name (2020). It was released alongside the album as the second and final single of the standard edition on January 10, 2020, by Interscope Records. The track was written by Gomez, Madison Love, Brett McLaughlin and its producers Sir Nolan and Simon Says. "Rare" is a pop and electropop song with lyrics exuding self-love and individuality. It peaked at number 30 on the US Billboard Hot 100. "Rare" was ranked as the 12th best song of the first half of 2020 by Billboard.

== Background ==
"Rare" was developed in a writing session with producer Sir Nolan and songwriters Madison Love and Brett McLaughlin. The song was initially written for Gomez, however she declined, and the song was recorded by other artists such as Madison Beer and Charli XCX. In 2018, Selena wanted the song for the album and received it through her label's A&R. According to Nolan, Gomez added melodies and ad-libs to make it fit her perspective. Producer Simon Says co-produced "Rare" with Nolan stating: "Simon and I went through her vocal takes a million times, comped them, Melodyned them, and went over the timing a trillion times. When it's an artist this big, you don't want to take any risks."

The song was revealed in an Instagram Live by Gomez on August 15, 2018. Later that day, co-writer McLaughlin confirmed his involvement in the song. Gomez teased the song's lyrics in an interview with Elle in September 2018. The song was then teased in the Rare album trailer.

On February 28, 2020, the Alexander 23 Edit of "Rare" was released for digital download and streaming.

== Composition ==
Musically, "Rare" is three minutes and forty seconds long and has been described as a pop and electropop song. In terms of music notation, "Rare" was composed using 4/4 common time in the key of C Mixolydian with a tempo of 115 beats per minute, following a chord progression of C–B♭. Gomez's vocal range spans from the low note of C_{4} to the high note of A_{5}, giving the song one octave and five notes of range. Gomez spoke to Billboard about "Rare":

I have always loved that song, and I always wanted it to be the title of the record. And I felt like it was a great complement to where I left off with my other singles, because it is honest and raw, and basically saying, "I know I don't have it all, I’m not perfect, but I know that I deserve great, and I deserve love, and I deserve all of it, self-love." It's just one of those things where it's a confidence thing, but without being cocky.

== Chart performance ==
"Rare" debuted and peaked at number thirty on the US Billboard Hot 100 following the release of the parent album and its accompanying music video. It later peaked at number 17 on the Mainstream Top 40 chart following its release as a radio single.

The song also peaked within the top 40 on charts in Canada, Australia, Ireland, New Zealand, the United Kingdom, and Scotland.

== Music video ==
The BRTHR-directed music video, released on January 10, 2020, accompanied the song and album's release. It features Gomez wandering in an ethereal world, laying on a spinning bed in a discotheque inspired room, and swimming in a pool. It was stated by Gomez that the music video was inspired by her philanthropic trip to Kenya months prior to the album release.

The dress Gomez wore in the video was designed by AADNEVIK.

== Live performances ==
On February 24, 2020, Gomez performed the song for the first time at the Village Studio. This live version was released for digital download and streaming on March 6, 2020.

== Track listing ==
- Album version
1. "Rare" – 3:40
- Digital download – Alexander 23 edit
1. "Rare" (Alexander 23 edit) – 3:48
- Digital download – Live from The Village Studio
1. "Rare" (Live from The Village Studio) – 3:51

== Awards and nominations ==
Year	Organization	Award	Result	Ref.
2020	People's Choice Awards	The Soundtrack Song of 2020	Nominated	

== Credits and personnel ==
Credits adapted from the liner notes of Rare.

=== Recording locations ===
- Recorded at Home Away From Home Studios (Los Angeles, California)
- Mixed at Mirrorball Studios (North Hollywood, California)
- Mastered at Sterling Sound (New York City)

=== Personnel ===
- Selena Gomez – lead vocals, backing vocals, songwriting
- Madison Love – songwriting, backing vocals
- Brett McLaughlin – songwriting
- Sir Nolan – songwriting, production, vocal production, engineering, instrumentation
- Simon Says – songwriting, production, vocal production, engineering, instrumentation
- Bart Schoudel – engineering
- Benjamin Rice – engineering
- Jake Faun – instrumentation
- Tony Maserati – mixing
- Miles Comaskey – mix engineering
- Chris Gehringer – mastering

== Charts ==
Chart (2020)	Peak position
Australia (ARIA)	22
Austria (Ö3 Austria Top 40)	19
Belgium (Ultratop 50 Flanders)	30
Belgium (Ultratop 50 Wallonia)	35
Canada Hot 100 (Billboard)	21
Canada CHR/Top 40 (Billboard)	22
Canada Hot AC (Billboard)	32
Croatia (HRT)	22
Czech Republic Airplay (ČNS IFPI)	12
Czech Republic Singles Digital (ČNS IFPI)	13
Denmark (Tracklisten)	36
Ecuador (National-Report)	49
Estonia (Eesti Ekspress)	17
France (SNEP)	73
Germany (GfK)	42
Greece (IFPI)	3
Hungary (Stream Top 40)	7
Hungary (Single Top 40)	19
Ireland (IRMA)	17
Italy (FIMI)	85
Lebanon (The Official Lebanese Top 20 English Chart)	17
Lithuania (AGATA)	14
Malaysia (RIM)	12
Mexico (Mexico Airplay)	9
Mexico Ingles Airplay (Billboard)	9
Netherlands (Dutch Top 40)	25
Netherlands (Single Top 100)	40
New Zealand (Recorded Music NZ)	28
Norway (VG-lista)	29
Panama (Monitor Latino)	18
Portugal (AFP)	33
Romania (Airplay 100)	46
Scottish Singles Sales (Official Charts)	35
Singapore (RIAS)	19
Slovakia Singles Digital (ČNS IFPI)	17
Slovenia (SloTop50)	25
Spain (PROMUSICAE)	60
Sweden (Sverigetopplistan)	44
Switzerland (Schweizer Hitparade)	28
UK Singles (Official Charts)	28
US Billboard Hot 100	30
US Dance Airplay (Billboard)	31
US Pop Airplay (Billboard)	17
US Rolling Stone Top 100	12

== Certifications ==
Region	Certification	Certified units/sales
Australia (ARIA)	Platinum	70,000^{‡}
Brazil (Pro-Música Brasil)	3× Platinum	120,000^{‡}
Canada (Music Canada)	Platinum	80,000^{‡}
New Zealand (RMNZ)	Gold	15,000^{‡}
Norway (IFPI Norway)	Gold	30,000^{‡}
Poland (ZPAV)	Gold	10,000^{‡}
United Kingdom (BPI)	Silver	200,000^{‡}
United States (RIAA)	Platinum	1,000,000^{‡}
^{‡} Sales+streaming figures based on certification alone.

== Release history ==
Region	Date	Format	Label	Ref.
Various	January 10, 2020	Digital download; streaming	Interscope	
Italy	January 17, 2020	Contemporary hit radio	Universal	
United Kingdom	January 18, 2020	Adult contemporary radio	Interscope	
United Kingdom	January 24, 2020	Contemporary hit radio	Interscope	
United States	February 4, 2020	Contemporary hit radio	Interscope	
