= Feel Me (Selena Gomez song) =

2020 promotional single by Selena Gomez

Promotional single by Selena Gomez

from the album Rare
- Released: February 21, 2020
- Recorded: 2016
- Studio: The Village (Santa Monica, CA)
- Genre: Dance
- Length: 3:46
- Label: Interscope
- Songwriters: Selena Gomez; Jacob Kasher; Ammar Malik; Ross Golan; Phil Shaouy; Lisa Scinta; Kurtis McKenzie; Jon Mills
- Producers: The Arcade; Phil Phever; Mills

Lyric video
- "Feel Me" on YouTube

"Feel Me" is a song by American singer Selena Gomez from the digital, streaming, vinyl and deluxe versions of her third studio album Rare (2020). It was released alongside the album's vinyl release date. The song debuted on her Revival Tour and was not originally intended for release. However, due to the song's popularity and high demand from fans, the track was announced for a February 2020 release date. It was released officially on February 21, 2020, through streaming services and digital copies, as the album's second promotional single. It also appears on the vinyl and deluxe editions of the album. The song achieved greater success in Poland, topping the chart. Musically, it is a dance track with ambient house influences.

== Credits and personnel ==
Credits adapted from Tidal.

- Selena Gomez – lead vocals, backing vocals, songwriter
- Phil Phever – producer, songwriter, vocal producer, programmer, backing vocals, bass guitar, keyboards
- J. Mills – producer, songwriter
- Kurtis McKenzie – producer, songwriter
- Ammar Malik – songwriter, backing vocals
- Ross Golan – songwriter, backing vocals
- Lisa Scinta – songwriter, backing vocals
- Jacob Kasher – songwriter
- Tony Maserati – mixer
- Najeeb Jones – assistant mixer
- Chris Gehringer – mastering engineer
- Will Quinnell – mastering engineer

== Charts ==
=== Weekly charts ===
Chart (2020)	Peak position
Australia (ARIA)	58
Austria (Ö3 Austria Top 40)	49
Canada Hot 100 (Billboard)	56
Czech Republic Singles Digital (ČNS IFPI)	44
Estonia (Eesti Tipp-40)	35
France (SNEP)	175
Germany (GfK)	63
Greece (IFPI)	51
Hungary (Stream Top 40)	24
Ireland (IRMA)	42
Lithuania (AGATA)	28
Netherlands (Single Top 100)	90
New Zealand Hot Singles (RMNZ)	2
Norway (VG-lista)	32
Poland Airplay (ZPAV)	1
Portugal (AFP)	78
Scotland Singles (OCC)	43
Slovakia Singles Digital (ČNS IFPI)	34
Sweden (Sverigetopplistan)	71
Switzerland (Schweizer Hitparade)	39
UK Singles (OCC)	89
US Billboard Hot 100	98
US Rolling Stone Top 100	76

=== Year-end charts ===
Chart (2020)	Position
Poland (ZPAV)	25

== Certifications ==
Region	Certification	Certified units/sales
Australia (ARIA)	Gold	35,000^{‡}
Brazil (Pro-Música Brasil)	Platinum	40,000^{‡}
Norway (IFPI Norway)	Gold	30,000^{‡}
Poland (ZPAV)	Gold	10,000^{‡}
^{‡} Sales+streaming figures based on certification alone.

== Release history ==
Region	Date	Format	Label	Ref.
Various	February 21, 2020	Digital download; streaming	Interscope	

== See also ==
- List of number-one singles of 2020 (Poland)
