= Vulnerable (Selena Gomez song) =

2020 song by Selena Gomez

Song by Selena Gomez

from the album Rare
- Released: January 10, 2020
- Studio: Interscope Studios (Santa Monica, California)
- Genre: Disco; electropop; synth-pop
- Length: 3:12
- Label: Interscope
- Songwriters: Selena Gomez; Amy Allen; Jonathan Bellion; Jordan Johnson; Stefan Johnson
- Producers: The Monsters & Strangerz; Jon Bellion

Lyric video
- "Vulnerable" on YouTube

"Vulnerable" is a song by American singer Selena Gomez from her third studio album, Rare (2020), included as the sixth track on the standard version album, and on the deluxe version the eighth track. The track was written by Gomez, Amy Allen, Jordan Johnson, Stefan Johnson, and Jonathan Bellion, with the latter handling production alongside the Monsters & Strangerz.

The song received acclaim from music critics, who praised Gomez's vocals and the songwriting.

== Composition ==
Musically, "Vulnerable" is a disco, electropop, and synth-pop song with elements of Italo disco and tropical house genres. The song features a "moody synth groove", a "chugging rhythm", and vocoded vocals with a "ghostly edge". In terms of music notation, "Vulnerable" was composed using common time in the key of G minor, with a tempo of 100 beats per minute. Gomez's vocal range spans from the low note of F_{3} to the high note of D^{5}, giving the song one octave and four tones of range. Lyrically, it finds Gomez struggling to let someone in, through the chorus "if I show you all my demons/and we dive into the deep end/would we crash and burn like every time before?", wondering whether they could handle her, if she showed her vulnerabilities to them. Gomez has also stated that the song is one of her favorites off the album.

== Critical reception ==
"Vulnerable" received acclaim from music critics. Quinn Moreland of Pitchfork called the song Gomez's "best performance" stating that she "sounds firm and assured even when she dips into a whisper." Idolator highlighted the song as a "delight" from Rare. Mike Wass from the website wrote that "Vulnerable" ranks "as one of best synth-pop offerings of 2020", calling it as "frighteningly addictive" as "musical heroin". Furthermore, the site ranked the song at number 6 on "The 100 Best Pop Songs of 2020" list.

== Credits and personnel ==
Credits adapted from the liner notes of Rare.

=== Recording locations ===
- Recorded at Interscope Studios (Santa Monica, California)
- Mixed at MixStar Studios (Virginia Beach, Virginia)
- Mastered at Sterling Sound (Edgewater, New Jersey)

=== Personnel ===
- Selena Gomez – lead vocals, songwriting
- The Monsters & Strangerz – production, instrumentation
- Jon Bellion – production, songwriting, instrumentation, backing vocals
- Amy Allen – songwriting, backing vocals
- Jordan Johnson – songwriting
- Stefan Johnson – songwriting, engineering
- Bart Schoudel – vocal production, engineering
- Gian Stone – additional vocal production
- Andrew Boyd – assisting
- John Hanes – engineering
- Serban Ghenea – mixing
- Chris Gehringer – mastering
- Will Quinnell – mastering

== Charts ==
| Chart (2020) | Peak position |
|---|---|
| Canada Hot 100 (Billboard) | 87 |
| New Zealand Hot Singles (RMNZ) | 13 |
| Portugal (AFP) | 129 |
| US Bubbling Under Hot 100 (Billboard) | 14 |

== Certifications ==
Certifications for "Vulnerable"
| Region | Certification | Certified units/sales |
|---|---|---|
| Brazil (Pro-Música Brasil) | Gold | 20,000^{‡} |
^{‡} Sales+streaming figures based on certification alone.

== Release history ==
| Region | Date | Format | Label | Ref. |
|---|---|---|---|---|
| Various | January 10, 2020 | Digital download; streaming | Interscope | |
