= Cashmere Cat discography =

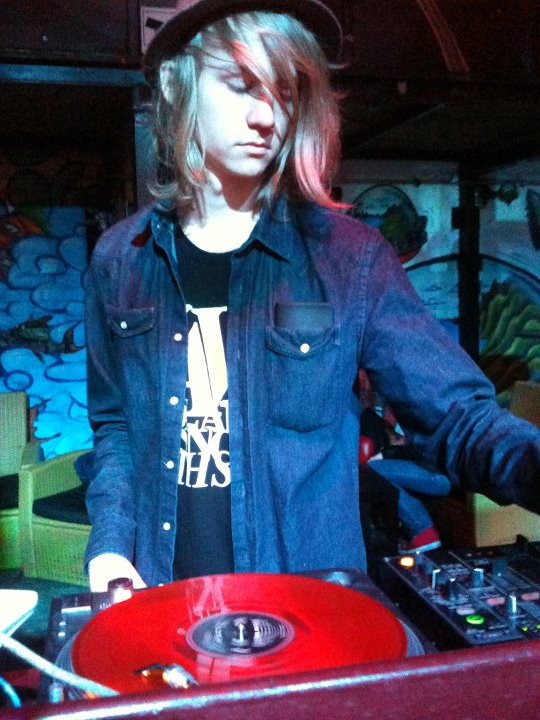
- Studio albums: 2
- EPs: 3
- Singles: 11

Norwegian DJ and producer Cashmere Cat has released two studio albums, three extended plays and several singles.

== Albums ==
List of albums, with selected details
Title	Album details	Peak chart positions			
Title	Album details	NOR	CAN	NZ Heat.	US
9	Released: 28 April 2017; Label: Interscope, Mad Love; Format: Digital download	14	70	4	119
Princess Catgirl	Released: 20 September 2019; Label: Interscope, Mad Love; Formats: Digital download, streaming	—	—	—	— (Note: Princess Catgirl did not enter the Billboard 200, but peaked at No. 12 on the Dance/Electronic Album Sales.)
"—" denotes a recording that did not chart or was not released.

== Extended plays ==
List of EPs, with selected details
Title	Extended play details
Mirror Maru	Released: 22 October 2012; Label: Pelican Fly; Format: Digital download
Mirror Maru (Remixes)	Released: 2 April 2013; Label: Pelican Fly, Ed Banger; Format: Digital download
Wedding Bells	Released: 10 February 2014; Label: LuckyMe; Format: Digital download, vinyl

== Singles ==
=== As lead artist ===
List of singles as lead artist, with selected chart positions, showing year released and album name
Title	Year	Peak chart positions										Certifications	Album
Title	Year	US	AUS	BEL (FL)	CAN	FRA	ITA	NLD	NZ Heat.	SPA	UK	Certifications	Album
"Aurora"	2013	—	—	—	—	—	—	—	—	—	—		Feathers EP Vol. 1
"With Me"	2013	—	—	— (Note: "With Me" did not enter the Ultratop 50, but peaked at No. 90 on the Flemish Ultratip chart.)	—	—	—	—	—	—	—		Wedding Bells EP
"Ice Rink" (with DJ Mustard)	2015	—	—	—	—	—	—	—	—	—	—		Non-album singles
"Adore" (Note: "Adore" only appears on the Japanese deluxe edition of 9.) (featuring Ariana Grande)	2015	93	—	— (Note: "Adore" did not enter the Ultratop 50, but peaked at No. 27 on the Flemish Urban chart.)	—	—	—	—	—	—	—		Non-album singles
"Throw Myself a Party" (featuring Starrah, 2 Chainz and Tory Lanez)	2016	—	—	—	—	—	—	—	—	—	—		Non-album singles
"9 (After Coachella)" (featuring MØ and Sophie)	2017	—	—	—	—	—	—	—	—	—	—		9
"Quit" (featuring Ariana Grande)	2017	—	56	—	100	152	—	81	4	—	—	RIAA: Gold; RMNZ: Gold	9
"Wild Love" (featuring The Weeknd and Francis and the Lights)	2017	—	—	—	—	—	—	—	—	—	—		9
"Trust Nobody" (featuring Selena Gomez and Tory Lanez)	2017	— (Note: "Trust Nobody" did not enter the Billboard Hot 100, but peaked at number three on the Bubbling Under Hot 100 Singles chart.)	46	— (Note: "Trust Nobody" did not enter the Ultratop 50, but peaked at No. 30 on the Flemish Ultratip chart.)	61	174	92	86	—	—	92	RIAA: Gold; RMNZ: Gold	9
"Love Incredible" (featuring Camila Cabello)	2017	—	—	—	—	—	—	—	5	45	—		9
"Miss You" (with Major Lazer and Tory Lanez)	2018	—	65	— (Note: "Miss You" did not enter the Ultratop 50, but peaked at No. 15 on the Flemish Ultratip chart.)	66	—	—	95	5	—	—	RMNZ: Gold	Non-album single
"Emotions"	2019	—	—	—	—	—	—	—	—	—	—		Princess Catgirl
"For Your Eyes Only"	2019	—	—	—	—	—	—	—	—	—	—		Princess Catgirl
"—" denotes items which were not released in that country or failed to chart.

=== As featured artist ===
List of singles as featured artist, with selected chart positions, showing year released and album name
Title	Year	Peak chart positions			Album
Title	Year	US	US R&B	US Rap	Album
"Party Girls" (Ludacris featuring Wiz Khalifa, Jeremih and Cashmere Cat)	2014	— (Note: "Party Girls" did not enter the Billboard Hot 100, but peaked at No. 13 on the Bubbling Under Hot 100 Singles.)	36	20	Non-album single

== Other appearances ==
List of other album appearances
Title	Year	Other artist(s)	Album
"Be My Baby"	2014	Ariana Grande	
"Four"	2014	BenZel, Juicy J	MEN EP
"Just a Thought"	2014	BenZel, Ryn Weaver	MEN EP
"Hopeless"	2017	Halsey	
"3AM"	2018	Trill Sammy	No Sleep Vol. 1

== Songwriting and production credits ==
Year	Title	Artist(s)	Album	Producer	Songwriter
2014	"OctaHate"	Ryn Weaver	Promises EP / The Fool	check	check
2014	"Break the Rules"	Charli XCX	Sucker	check	check
2014	"Body Language" (featuring Tinashe & Usher)	Kid Ink	Full Speed	check	check
2014	"All Hands on Deck"	Tinashe	Aquarius	check	check
2015	"Drop That Kitty" (featuring Charli XCX & Tinashe)	Ty Dolla Sign	Non-album single	check	check
2015	"Red Balloon"	Charli XCX	Home: OST	check	check
2015	"New Constellations"	Ryn Weaver	The Fool	check	check
2015	"Drifting" (featuring Chris Brown & Tory Lanez)	G-Eazy	When It's Dark Out	check	check
2016	"Ezy"	Nina Las Vegas		check	check
2016	"LA Confidential"	Tory Lanez	Non-album single	check	check
2016	"Wolves"	Kanye West	The Life of Pablo	check	check
2016	"Frank's Track"	Kanye West	The Life of Pablo	check	check
2016	"Comeback"	Francis and the Lights	Farewell, Starlite!	check	
2016	"My Citys Gone"	Francis and the Lights	Farewell, Starlite!	check	
2016	"Running Man / Gospel OP1	Francis and the Lights	Farewell, Starlite!	check	
2016	"Can't Stay Party"	Francis and the Lights	Farewell, Starlite!	check	
2016	" I Want You to Shake"	Francis and the Lights	Farewell, Starlite!	check	
2016	"It's Alright 2 Cry"	Francis and the Lights	Farewell, Starlite!	check	
2016	"Thank You"	Francis and the Lights	Farewell, Starlite!	check	
2016	"See Her Out (That's Just Life)" (featuring Bon Iver)	Francis and the Lights	Farewell, Starlite!	check	
2016	"Friends" (featuring Bon Iver & Kanye West)	Francis and the Lights	Farewell, Starlite!	check	
2016	"May I Have This Dance"	Francis and the Lights	Farewell, Starlite!	check	
2016	"Yammy Gang" (featuring ASAP Mob & Tatianna Paulino)	ASAP Ferg	Always Strive and Prosper	check	check
2016	"Luv"	Tory Lanez	I Told You	check	check
2016	"High"	Tory Lanez	I Told You	check	check
2016	"Just Luv Me"	Britney Spears	Glory	check	check
2016	"The Ends"	Travis Scott	Birds in the Trap Sing; McKnight	check	check
2016	"Way Back"	Travis Scott	Birds in the Trap Sing; McKnight	check	check
2016	"True Colors"	The Weeknd	Starboy	check	check
2016	"Attention"	The Weeknd	Starboy	check	check
2016	"All I Know" (featuring Future)	The Weeknd	Starboy	check	check
2016	"Die for You"	The Weeknd	Starboy	check	check
2017	"Nights with You"	MØ	Forever Neverland (Japanese edition)	check	check
2017	"Now or Never"	Halsey	Hopeless Fountain Kingdom	check	check
2017	"Hopeless" (featuring Cashmere Cat)	Halsey	Hopeless Fountain Kingdom	check	check
2017	"Eyes Closed"	Halsey	Hopeless Fountain Kingdom	check	check
2017	"Crying in the Club"	Camila Cabello	Crying in the Club	check	check
2017	"When a Woman"	Shakira	El Dorado	check	check
2017	"Lonely Together" (featuring Rita Ora)	Avicii	Avīci (01) EP	check	check
2017	"Selfish Love"	Jessie Ware	Glasshouse	check	check
2017	"Never Call Me" (featuring Kurupt)	Jhene Aiko	Trip	check	check
2017	"I Sip"	Tory Lanez	Non-album single	check	check
2017	"Never Go Back"	Francis and the Lights	Just for Us	check	
2017	"Just For Us"	Francis and the Lights	Just for Us	check	
2017	"Back In Time"	Francis and the Lights	Just for Us	check	
2017	"Cruise"	Francis and the Lights	Just for Us	check	
2018	"Buttcheeks"	6 Dogs	Non-album single	check	check
2018	"Hypnotized"	Tory Lanez	Memories Don't Die	check	check
2018	"Freaky Friday" (featuring Chris Brown)	Lil Dicky	Non-album single		check
2018	"Black & White"	Juice WRLD	Goodbye & Good Riddance		check
2018	"Gang Gang"	Migos	Culture II	check	
2018	"Feel the Love" (featuring Pusha T)	Kids See Ghosts	Kids See Ghosts	check	
2018	"Not for Radio" (featuring Puff Daddy & 070 Shake)	Nas	Nasir	check	check
2018	"Everything" (featuring The-Dream & Kanye West)	Nas	Nasir	check	check
2018	"Eastside" (with Halsey & Khalid)	Benny Blanco	Friends Keep Secrets	check	
2018	"Better to Lie" (with Jesse & Swae Lee)	Benny Blanco	Friends Keep Secrets	check	check
2018	"Roses" (with Juice Wrld featuring Brendon Urie)	Benny Blanco	Friends Keep Secrets	check	check
2018	"Just for Us, Pt. 2"	Benny Blanco	Friends Keep Secrets	check	check
2018	"More / Diamond Ring" (featuring Ty Dolla Sign and 6lack)	Benny Blanco	Friends Keep Secrets	check	check
2018	"Graduation (with Juice Wrld)"	Benny Blanco	Friends Keep Secrets	check	check
2018	"Break My Heart" (featuring Ryan Beatty)	Benny Blanco	Friends Keep Secrets		check
2018	"The Video in the Pool"	Francis and The Lights	The Video in the Pool	check	
2019	"Earth"	Lil Dicky	Non-album single	check	check
2019	"Nightmare"	Halsey	Non-album single	check	check
2019	"Euphorion"	Palmistry	Afterlife	check	check
2019	"Do u Need Love"	Francis and the Lights	Non-album single	check	check
2019	"Señorita"	Shawn Mendes and Camila Cabello	Shawn Mendes / Romance	check	check
2019	"Take Me to the Light" (featuring Bon Iver and Kanye West)	Francis and the Lights	Take Me to the Light	check	
2019	"Sad Day"	FKA Twigs	Magdalene	check	check
2019	"Mary Magdalene"	FKA Twigs	Magdalene		check
2020	"Ashley"	Halsey	Manic	check	check
2020	"Forever ... (Is a Long Time)"	Halsey	Manic	check	check
2020	"I Hate Everybody"	Halsey	Manic	check	check
2020	"Killing Boys"	Halsey	Manic	check	check
2020	"More"	Halsey	Manic	check	check
2020	"Real Shit"	Juice WRLD featuring Benny Blanco	Friends Keep Secrets 2	check	check
2020	"Palladium"	Kacy Hill	Is It Selfish If We Talk About Me Again	check	
2020	"Erase U"	The Kid Laroi	F*ck Love	check	check
2021	"Unlearn" (with Gracie Abrams)	Benny Blanco	Friends Keep Secrets 2	check	check
2021	"Stay" (with Justin Bieber)	The Kid Laroi	F*ck Love 3: Over You	check	check
2021	"Matt Hardy 999" (with Juice Wrld)"	Trippie Redd	Trip at Knight	check	check
2021	"Danny Phantom" (with XXXTentacion)"	Trippie Redd	Trip at Knight	check	check
2022	"regret"	Iann Dior	on to better things	check	check
2022	"Bad Decisions"	BTS		check	check
2023	"Moonlight"	Kali Uchis	Red Moon In Venus	check	check
2023	"Count of Three"	Underscores		check	check
2023	"Die For You Remix"	The Weeknd and Ariana Grande		check	check
2023	"Die 4 Me"	Halsey	Non-album single	check	check
2023	"Single Soon"	Selena Gomez	Non-album single	check	check
2023	"Lace It"	Juice WRLD & Eminem	Non-album single	check	check
2023	"Second Coming"	Lil Dicky	Penith	check	check
2023	"I'm Drunk"	Lil Dicky	Penith	check	check
2024	"Touch"	Katseye	Non-album single	check	check
2024	"DEGENERE"	Myke Towers	Non-album single	check	check
2024	"We Good"	Lil Uzi Vert	Eternal Atake 2	check	check
2024	"Meteor Man"	Lil Uzi Vert	Eternal Atake 2	check	check
2024	"Paars in the Mars"	Lil Uzi Vert	Eternal Atake 2	check	check
2024	"The Rush" (feat. Big Time Rush)	Lil Uzi Vert	Eternal Atake 2	check	check
2024	"She stank"	Lil Uzi Vert	Eternal Atake 2	check	check
2024	"Black Hole"	Lil Uzi Vert	Eternal Atake 2	check	check
2024	"Chill Bae"	Lil Uzi Vert	Eternal Atake 2	check	check
2024	"Goddard Song"	Lil Uzi Vert	Eternal Atake 2	check	check
2024	"Perky Sex"	Lil Uzi Vert	Eternal Atake 2	check	check
2024	"Space High"	Lil Uzi Vert	Eternal Atake 2	check	check
2024	"Conceited"	Lil Uzi Vert	Eternal Atake 2	check	check
2024	"What Do I Do"	SZA	SOS Deluxe: LANA	check	check
2025	"Call Me When You Break Up"	Selena Gomez, Benny Blanco, Gracie Abrams	I Said I Love You First	check	check
2025	"Don't Wanna Cry"	Selena Gomez and Benny Blanco	I Said I Love You First		check
2025	"Cowboy"	Selena Gomez and Benny Blanco	I Said I Love You First	check	check
2025	"Bluest Flame"	Selena Gomez and Benny Blanco	I Said I Love You First	check	check
2025	"Do You Wanna Be Perfect"	Selena Gomez and Benny Blanco	I Said I Love You First	check	check
2025	"You Said You Were Sorry"	Selena Gomez and Benny Blanco	I Said I Love You First	check	check
2025	"Pretty Promises, (feat. Mariah The Scientist)	Kali Uchis	Sincerely: P.S	check	check
2025	"Dancing in the Smoke"	Giveon		check	check
2025	"Nachica"	Neton Vega	DELIRIUM	check	check
2025	"906090"	Neton Vega Ft. Myke Towers	DELIRIUM	check	check
2025	"Perro Fiel"	Neton Vega with benny blanco	DELIRIUM	check	check
2025	"Unica"	Tainy and Karol G			check
2026	"Butterflies"	Brent Faiyaz		check	check
2026	"Other side"	Brent Faiyaz		check	check
2026	“Matadora”	Karol G		check	check
2026	"Less than a Lover"	JENNIE		check	check
2026	"Too Nice"	Lizzo		check	check
2026	"Te Olvido (La La)"	benny blanco, Selena Gomez, Becky G	Hermoso	check	check
2026	"Joven I Salvage"	benny blanco and Bb Trickz	Hermoso	check	check
2026	"Un Poco Perdido"	benny blanco and Neton Vega	Hermoso	check	check
2026	"Memoria De Paz"	benny blanco and The Marías	Hermoso	check	check
2026	"Te Amo"	benny blanco	Hermoso	check	check
2026	"Cinco"	benny blanco	Hermoso	check	check
2026	"Ay Bendito"	benny blanco, Mora and Ovy On The Drums	Hermoso	check	check
2026	"Degenere"	benny blanco and Myke Towers	Hermoso	check	check
2026	"I'm the Man"	Adéla	Prima	check	check

== Remixes and edits ==
- "Cross the Dancefloor (DJ Final Remix)" by Treasure Fingers (2009)
- "I'll Get You (Final Remix)" on Kitsuné X The Cobrasnake EP (featuring Jeppe) by Classixx (Hush Sound, 2009)
- "220V/Spektral (Final Mix)" on Bananfluer Overalt by Jaga Jazzist (Ninja Tune, 2010)
- "Les Paradis Artificiels (Final Remix)" on Les Paradis Artificiels EP by Douze (Discotexas, 2010)
- "Mátkelávlla (The Traveller)" on Fargga by Berit Margrethe Oskal (Mátki Records, 2010)
- "Oslo (Final Remix)" by Mathias Eick (2010)
- "Faith (Final Remix)" on Faith Remixes by Montée (Oslo Records, 2011)
- "Different (Cashmere Cat Remix)" on Different (Special Remix Edition) EP by LidoLido (Universal Music A/S, 2011)
- "Fake ID (Kidz in the Club) (Cashmere Cat Remix)" on Different (Special Remix Edition) EP by LidoLido (Universal Music A/S, 2011)
- "Treasury of We (X.V. & Cashmere Cat Remix)" by Glasser (2011)
- "Shell Suite (Cashmere Cat Remix)" on Shell Suite & Remixes by Chad Valley (Loose Lips, 2011)
- "Heart on Fire (Merry-Go-Round) - Cashmere Cat Remix" by Winta (daWorks Entertainment Ltd, 2011)
- "Jaywalking (Cashmere Cat Remix)" on Jaywalking (Remixes) by Samsaya (3 millimeter, 2011)
- "Give (Cashmere Cat Remix)" on Best Intentions by Sound of Rum (Sunday Best Recordings, 2011)
- "Bruk (Fellepus Remix)" on Draw EP by Slick Shoota (Hyperboloid Records, 2012)
- "National Anthem (Cashmere Cat Remix)" by Lana Del Rey (Interscope Records, 2012)
- "773 Love (Cashmere Cat Edit)" by Jeremih (published on SoundCloud, 2012)
- "No Lie (Cashmere Cat Edit)" (featuring Drake) by 2 Chainz (published on SoundCloud, 2012)
- "Call My Name (Cashmere Cat Remix)" on Tove Styrke by Tove Styrke (Sony Music Germany, 2012)
- "Wettex (Cashmere Cat Remix)" on Electric Empire Remixes by Feadz & Kito (Ed Banger Records, 2012)
- "Fallin Love (Cashmere Cat Remix)" by BenZel (published on SoundCloud, 2013)
- "Do You... (Cashmere Cat Remix)" by Miguel (published on SoundCloud, 2013)
- "Be My Baby (Cashmere Cat Edit)" by Ariana Grande (published on SoundCloud, 2014)
- "Octahate (Cashmere Cat Remix)" by Ryn Weaver (Friends Keep Secrets, 2014)
- "And Uh (Cashmere Cat Edit)" by Kid Antoine (Her Records, 2015)
- "Forever 1 (Cashmere Cat Remix)" on Lantern by Hudson Mohawke (Warp Records, 2015)
