= Benny Blanco production discography =

Projects supervised by American producer

This is the production discography for American producer Benny Blanco.

== Albums and singles ==
Year	Title	Artist	Album / EP	Songwriter	Producer	Exec. Producer
2007	"Send Some Shootaz"	Hell Rell	Eat with Me or Eat a Box of Bullets		check	
2007	"Shake That"	Spank Rock	Bangers & Cash	check	check	
2007	"B-O-O-T-A-Y"	Spank Rock	Bangers & Cash	check	check	
2007	"Pu$$y"	Spank Rock	Bangers & Cash	check	check	
2007	"Bitch!"	Spank Rock	Bangers & Cash	check	check	
2007	"Loose"	Spank Rock	Bangers & Cash	check	check	
2008	"Circus"; RIAA: 5× Platinum	Britney Spears	Circus; RIAA: 3× Platinum	check	check	
2008	"Shattered Glass"	Britney Spears	Circus; RIAA: 3× Platinum	check	check	
2008	"Lace and Leather"	Britney Spears	Circus; RIAA: 3× Platinum	check	check	
2008	"Broken Pieces"	Lil Mama	Voice of the Young People		check	
2008	"Hot n Cold"; RIAA: 8× Platinum	Katy Perry	One of the Boys; RIAA: 3× Platinum		check	
2008	"I Kissed a Girl" RIAA: 6× Platinum	Katy Perry	One of the Boys; RIAA: 3× Platinum		check	
2008	"Don't Ask Why"	Vanessa Hudgens	Identified		check	
2008	"Amazed"	Vanessa Hudgens	Identified		check	
2008	"Set It Off"	Vanessa Hudgens	Identified		check	
2008	"Kennedy"	Vanessa Hudgens	Identified		check	
2009	"Watch You Go"	Jordin Sparks	Battlefield	check	check	
2009	"Tell Me What Your Name Is"	Ciara	Fantasy Ride	check	check	
2009	"Dollhouse"	Priscilla Renea	Jukebox	check	check	
2009	"Touch Me"	Flo Rida	R.O.O.T.S. RIAA: Platinum	check	check	
2009	"Don't Trust Me" RIAA: 5× Platinum	3OH!3	Want RIAA: Platinum	check	check	
2009	"Rich Man" RIAA: Gold	3OH!3	Want RIAA: Platinum	check	check	
2009	"So Human"	Lady Sovereign	Jigsaw	check	check	
2009	"Pennies"	Lady Sovereign	Jigsaw	check	check	
2009	"Stupid Love Letter"	Friday Night Boys	Off the Deep End	check	check	
2010	"Dynamite" RIAA: 8× Platinum	Taio Cruz	Rokstarr	check	check	
2010	"Dirty Picture"	Taio Cruz	Rokstarr			
2010	"Eenie Meenie" RIAA: Platinum	Sean Kingston and Justin Bieber	My World 2.0; RIAA: 4× Platinum	check	check	
2010	"Blah Blah Blah"	Ke$ha	Animal; RIAA: 4× Platinum	check	check	
2010	"Tik Tok" RIAA: 12× Platinum	Ke$ha	Animal; RIAA: 4× Platinum	check	check	
2010	"Party at a Rich Dude's House"	Ke$ha	Animal; RIAA: 4× Platinum	check	check	
2010	"Dancing With Tears in My Eyes"	Ke$ha	Animal; RIAA: 4× Platinum	check	check	
2010	"Blind"	Ke$ha	Animal; RIAA: 4× Platinum	check	check	
2010	"Your Love Is My Drug" RIAA: 5× Platinum	Ke$ha	Animal; RIAA: 4× Platinum	check	check	
2010	"Somebody to Love (Remix)"	Justin Bieber and Usher	Versus	check	check	
2010	"California Gurls" RIAA: Diamond	Katy Perry	Teenage Dream; RIAA: Diamond	check	check	
2010	"Teenage Dream" RIAA: Diamond	Katy Perry	Teenage Dream; RIAA: Diamond	check	check	
2010	"My First Kiss" RIAA: Gold	3OH!3	Streets of Gold	check	check	
2010	"Streets of Gold"	3OH!3	Streets of Gold	check	check	
2010	"Double Vision"	3OH!3	Streets of Gold	check	check	
2010	"Please Don't Go" RIAA: 2× Platinum	Mike Posner	31 Minutes to Takeoff RIAA: Platinum	check	check	
2010	"Cheated"	Mike Posner	31 Minutes to Takeoff RIAA: Platinum	check	check	
2010	"We R Who We R" RIAA: 5× Platinum	Ke$ha	Cannibal; RIAA: Platinum	check	check	
2010	"Sleazy" RIAA: Gold	Ke$ha	Cannibal; RIAA: Platinum	check	check	
2010	"Blow" RIAA: 4× Platinum	Ke$ha	Cannibal; RIAA: Platinum	check	check	
2010	"Grow A Pear"	Ke$ha	Cannibal; RIAA: Platinum	check	check	
2010	"Who Dat Girl"	Flo Rida	Only One Flo	check	check	
2011	"Get Over U"	Neon Hitch	Non-album singles	check	check	
2011	"Bad Dog"	Neon Hitch	Non-album singles	check	check	
2011	"Silly Girl"	Neon Hitch	Non-album singles	check	check	
2011	"(Drop Dead) Beautiful"	Britney Spears	Femme Fatale; RIAA: Platinum	check	check	
2011	"Gasoline"	Britney Spears	Femme Fatale; RIAA: Platinum	check	check	
2011	"No Sleep" RIAA: 2× Platinum	Wiz Khalifa	Rolling Papers RIAA: 2× Platinum	check	check	
2011	"Stereo Hearts" featuring Adam Levine RIAA: 5× Platinum	Gym Class Heroes	The Papercut Chronicles II	check	check	
2011	"Ass Back Home" RIAA: Platinum	Gym Class Heroes	The Papercut Chronicles II	check	check	
2011	"Moves like Jagger" featuring Christina Aguilera RIAA: Diamond	Maroon 5	Hands All Over RIAA: Platinum	check	check	
2011	"Come N Go"	Pitbull	Planet Pit RIAA: 2× Platinum	check	check	
2011	"She Doesn't Mind"	Sean Paul	Tomahawk Technique	check	check	
2012	"Fuck U Betta"	Neon Hitch	Non-album singles	check	check	
2012	"Gold"	Neon Hitch	Non-album singles	check	check	
2012	"Heart Attack" RIAA: Platinum	Trey Songz	Chapter V	check	check	
2012	"Masquerade"	Nicki Minaj	Pink Friday: Roman Reloaded	check	check	
2012	"Payphone" featuring Wiz Khalifa RIAA: 7× Platinum	Maroon 5	Overexposed RIAA: Platinum	check	check	
2012	"Beautiful Goodbye"	Maroon 5	Overexposed RIAA: Platinum	check	check	
2012	"Work Hard, Play Hard" RIAA: 2× Platinum	Wiz Khalifa	O.N.I.F.C.	check	check	
2012	"Naked Love"	Adam Lambert	Trespassing	check	check	
2012	"Seasons"	Rome	Dedication EP	check	check	
2012	"Oz of Love"	Rome	Dedication EP	check	check	
2012	"Die Young" RIAA: 6× Platinum	Kesha	Warrior; RIAA: Platinum	check	check	
2012	"C'Mon" RIAA: Platinum	Kesha	Warrior; RIAA: Platinum	check	check	
2012	"Thinking of You"	Kesha	Warrior; RIAA: Platinum	check	check	
2012	"Crazy Kids" RIAA: Platinum	Kesha	Warrior; RIAA: Platinum	check	check	
2012	"Supernatural"	Kesha	Warrior; RIAA: Platinum	check	check	
2012	"Last Goodbye"	Kesha	Warrior; RIAA: Platinum	check	check	
2012	"Diamonds" RIAA: Diamonds	Rihanna	Unapologetic; RIAA: 3× Platinum	check	check	
2012	"Turn Around"	Conor Maynard	Contrast	check	check	
2012	"Natalie"	Bruno Mars	Unorthodox Jukebox; RIAA: 6× Platinum	check	check	
2012	"That High"	Pitbull	Global Warming: Meltdown	check	check	
2012	"Seasons"	Rome	Dedication EP	check	check	
2013	"If I Lose Myself" RIAA: 2× Platinum	OneRepublic	Native; RIAA: Platinum	check	check	
2013	"Something I Need"	OneRepublic	Native; RIAA: Platinum	check	check	
2013	"Fall Down"	Will.i.am	#willpower	check	check	
2013	"How to Be a Heartbreaker" RIAA: Platinum	Marina and the Diamonds	Electra Heart RIAA: Gold	check	check	
2013	"Thunder"	Jessie J	Alive	check	check	
2013	“Just Be Mine”	Cher Lloyd	Sorry I’m Late	check	check	
2013	"Other Side of Love"	Sean Paul	Full Frequency	check	check	
2013	"Shame"	Keith Urban	Fuse RIAA: Platinum	check	check	
2013	"This Moment"	Katy Perry	Prism; RIAA: 5× Platinum	check	check	
2013	"It Takes Two"	Katy Perry	Prism; RIAA: 5× Platinum	check	check	
2013	"Cannonball"	Lea Michele	Louder	check	check	
2013	"Make a Move"	Gavin DeGraw	Make a Move	check	check	
2013	"Top of the World"	Mike Posner	Non-album single	check	check	
2013	"Losing Sleep"	John Newman	Tribute	check	check	
2013	"Rough Water"	Travie McCoy	Non-album single		check	
2013	"When I Find Love Again"	James Blunt	Single from Moon Landing (Apollo Edition)		check	
2014	"Want Dem All"	Sean Paul	Full Frequency	check		
2014	"Just Another Night"	Icona Pop	This Is... Icona Pop RIAA: Gold	check	check	
2014	"We All Want the Same Thing"	Rixton	Let the Road	check	check	
2014	"Hotel Ceiling"	Rixton	Let the Road	check	check	
2014	"Me and My Broken Heart" RIAA: Platinum	Rixton	Let the Road	check	check	
2014	"Appreciated"	Rixton	Let the Road	check	check	
2014	"Maps" RIAA: 4× Platinum	Maroon 5	V RIAA: 3× Platinum	check	check	
2014	"Animals" RIAA: Platinum	Maroon 5	V RIAA: 3× Platinum	check	check	
2014	"Leaving California"	Maroon 5	V RIAA: 3× Platinum	check	check	
2014	"My Heart Is Open"	Maroon 5	V RIAA: 3× Platinum	check	check	
2014	"Shoot Love"	Maroon 5	V RIAA: 3× Platinum	check		
2014	"Black Widow" RIAA: 5× Platinum	Iggy Azalea	The New Classic RIAA: 2× Platinum	check	check	
2014	"Don't" RIAA: 5× Platinum	Ed Sheeran	x RIAA: 6× Platinum	check	check	
2014	"Why Try"	Ariana Grande	My Everything; RIAA: 4× Platinum	check	check	
2014	"Be My Baby"	Ariana Grande	My Everything; RIAA: 4× Platinum	check	check	
2014	"Wait on Me"	Rixton	Let the Road	check	check	
2014	"I Like Girls"	Rixton	Let the Road			
2014	"We All Want The Same Thing"	Rixton	Let the Road			
2014	"Make Out"	Rixton	Let the Road			
2014	"Tough Love"	Jessie Ware	Tough Love	check	check	
2014	"You and I Forever"	Jessie Ware	Tough Love	check	check	
2014	"Say You Love Me"	Jessie Ware	Tough Love	check	check	
2014	"Kind of... Sometimes... Maybe"	Jessie Ware	Tough Love	check	check	
2014	"Champagne Kisses"	Jessie Ware	Tough Love	check	check	
2014	"Baby Don't Lie" RIAA: Gold	Gwen Stefani	Non-album single	check	check	
2014	"Caught in the Middle"	Charli XCX	Sucker	check	check	
2014	"So Over You"	Charli XCX	Sucker			
2014	"Just a Thought"	Benzel	Men			
2014	"Four"	Benzel	Men			
2014	"Touch"	Benzel	Men			
2014	"Wasted Love"	Benzel	Men			
2014	"Party Girls"	Ludacris	Non-album single		check	
2014	"Together"	Calvin Harris	Motion RIAA: Platinum			
	"The City is Yours"	Jamie Foxx	Annie			
2015	"The Fool"	Ryn Weaver	The Fool	check	check	check
2015	"Octahate" RIAA: Gold	Ryn Weaver	The Fool			
2015	"Promises"	Ryn Weaver	The Fool			
2015	"Sail On"	Ryn Weaver	The Fool			
2015	"Here is Home"	Ryn Weaver	The Fool			
2015	"Stay Low"	Ryn Weaver	The Fool			
2015	"Free"	Ryn Weaver	The Fool			
2015	"Pierre" RIAA: Gold	Ryn Weaver	The Fool			
2015	"Runaway"	Ryn Weaver	The Fool			
2015	"New Constellations"	Ryn Weaver	The Fool			
2015	"Traveling Song"	Ryn Weaver	The Fool			
2015	"Lifted Up (1985)"	Passion Pit	Kindred	check	check	
2015	"Whole Life Story"	Passion Pit	Kindred	check	check	
2015	"All I Want"	Passion Pit	Kindred	check	check	
2015	"Until We Can't (Let's Go)"	Passion Pit	Kindred	check	check	
2015	"Kill Em with Kindness" RIAA: Platinum	Selena Gomez	Revival RIAA: Platinum	check	check	
2015	"Same Old Love" RIAA: 3× Platinum	Selena Gomez	Revival RIAA: Platinum	check	check	
2015	"When Love Hurts"	JoJo	III.	check	check	
2015	"R.I.P. 2 My Youth" RIAA: Gold	The Neighbourhood	Wiped Out! RIAA: Gold	check	check	
2015	"Fire and the Flood"	Vance Joy	Dream Your Life Away RIAA: 2× Platinum	check	check	
2015	"Straight Into Your Arms"	Vance Joy	Dream Your Life Away RIAA: 2× Platinum	check	check	
2015	"...goingtohell"	Miguel	Wildheart	check	check	
2015	"Love Yourself" RIAA: 9× Platinum	Justin Bieber	Purpose; RIAA: 6× Platinum	check	check	
2015	"Sitting Pretty" ft. Wiz Khalifa	Ty Dolla $ign	Free TC RIAA: Gold	check	check	
2015	"Watch Me Rise"	Mikky Ekko	Time			
2015	"Somebody Else"	Rico Love	Turn The Lights On			
2015	"Blind Fool"	Max Frost	Intoxication			
2015	"Withdrawal"	Max Frost	Intoxication			
2016	"All in My Head (Flex)" ft. Fetty WapRIAA: Platinum	Fifth Harmony	7/27 RIAA: Platinum	check		
2016	"Luv" RIAA: 2× Platinum	Tory Lanez	I Told You RIAA: Gold	check	check	
2016	"Cold Water" ft. Justin Bieber and MØ; RIAA: 4× Platinum	Major Lazer	Music Is the Weapon	check	check	
2016	"See Her Out (That's Just Life)"	Francis and the Lights	Farewell, Starlite!	check	check	
2016	"Comeback"	Francis and the Lights	Farewell, Starlite!	check	check	
2016	"Can't Stay Party"	Francis and the Lights	Farewell, Starlite!	check	check	
2016	"I Want You to Shake"	Francis and the Lights	Farewell, Starlite!	check	check	
2016	"May I Have This Dance"	Francis and the Lights	Farewell, Starlite!	check	check	
2016	"May I Have This Dance (Remix)" ft. Chance the Rapper	Francis and the Lights	Farewell, Starlite!	check	check	
2016	"My City's Gone" ft. Kanye West	Francis and the Lights	Farewell, Starlite!	check	check	
2016	"Running Man / Gospel OP1"	Francis and the Lights	Farewell, Starlite!	check	check	
2016	"It's Alright to Cry"	Francis and the Lights	Farewell, Starlite!	check	check	
2016	"Friends" ft. Bon Iver and Kanye West	Francis and the Lights	Farewell, Starlite!	check	check	
2016	"Thank You"	Francis and the Lights	Farewell, Starlite!	check	check	
2016	"True Colors" RIAA: Platinum	The Weeknd	Starboy; RIAA: 6× Platinum	check	check	
2016	"Attention"	The Weeknd	Starboy; RIAA: 6× Platinum	check	check	
2016	"Don't Wanna Know" featuring Kendrick LamarRIAA: 2× Platinum	Maroon 5	Red Pill Blues RIAA: Platinum	check	check	
2016	"So Long"	Sam Trocki	Bye Polar	check	check	
2016	"Wild Love" ft. The Weeknd and Francis and the Lights	Cashmere Cat	9	check	check	
2016	"Trust Nobody" ft. Selena Gomez and Tory Lanez; RIAA: Gold	Cashmere Cat	9	check	check	
2016	"Throw Myself a Party" ft. 2 Chainz, Starrah and Tory Lanez	Cashmere Cat	Non-album single	check	check	
2016	"LA Confidential" RIAA: Gold	Tory Lanez	Non-album single	check	check	
2016	"Stuck On U"	Tory Lanez	Non-album single	check	check	
2017	"Run Up" ft. PARTYNEXTDOOR and Nicki Minaj	Major Lazer	Music Is the Weapon	check		
2017	"Castle on the Hill"	Ed Sheeran	÷ RIAA: 5× Platinum	check	check	check
2017	"Dive" RIAA: Platinum	Ed Sheeran	÷ RIAA: 5× Platinum	check	check	check
2017	"Perfect" RIAA: 13× Platinum	Ed Sheeran	÷ RIAA: 5× Platinum		check	check
2017	"Barcelona" RIAA: Gold	Ed Sheeran	÷ RIAA: 5× Platinum	check	check	check
2017	"Happier" RIAA: 2× Platinum	Ed Sheeran	÷ RIAA: 5× Platinum	check	check	check
2017	"Supermarket Flowers" RIAA: Platinum	Ed Sheeran	÷ RIAA: 5× Platinum	check	check	check
2017	"Nancy Mulligan" RIAA: Gold	Ed Sheeran	÷ RIAA: 5× Platinum	check	check	check
2017	"Bibia Be Ye Ye" RIAA: Gold	Ed Sheeran	÷ RIAA: 5× Platinum	check	check	check
2017	"New Man" RIAA: Gold	Ed Sheeran	÷ RIAA: 5× Platinum	check	check	check
2017	"Love" RIAA: Platinum	Lana Del Rey	Lust for Life RIAA: Gold	check	check	
2017	"Issues" RIAA: 5× Platinum	Julia Michaels	Nervous System	check	check	
2017	"At My Best" ft. Hailee SteinfeldRIAA: Platinum	Machine Gun Kelly	Bloom	check		
2017	"Now or Never" RIAA: 3× Platinum	Halsey	Hopeless Fountain Kingdom; RIAA: 2× Platinum	check	check	
2017	"Eyes Closed" RIAA: Gold	Halsey	Hopeless Fountain Kingdom; RIAA: 2× Platinum	check	check	
2017	"Hopeless"	Halsey	Hopeless Fountain Kingdom; RIAA: 2× Platinum	check	check	
2017	"Nights with You" RIAA: Gold	MØ	Non-album single	check	check	
2017	"Night Night" ft. Kehlani	Cashmere Cat	9	check	check	
2017	"Europa Pools" ft. Kacy Hill	Cashmere Cat	9	check		
2017	"9 (After Coachella)" ft. MØ and SOPHIE	Cashmere Cat	9	check	check	
2017	"Quit" ft. Ariana Grande; RIAA: Gold	Cashmere Cat	9	check	check	
2017	"Infinite Stripes" ft. Ty Dolla Sign	Cashmere Cat	9	check	check	
2017	"Love Incredible" ft. Camila Cabello	Cashmere Cat	9	check	check	
2017	"Plz Don't Go" ft. Jhené Aiko	Cashmere Cat	9	check	check	
2017	"Crying in the Club" RIAA: Platinum	Camila Cabello	Crying in the Club	check	check	
2017	"Lonely Together" ft. Rita Ora; RIAA: Platinum	Avicii	Avīci (01) and Phoenix	check	check	
2017	"Selfish Love"	Jessie Ware	Glasshouse	check	check	
2017	"Hearts"	Jessie Ware	Glasshouse	check	check	
2017	"Sam"	Jessie Ware	Glasshouse	check	check	
2017	"Never Call Me" ft. Kurupt	Jhené Aiko	Trip RIAA: Platinum	check	check	
2017	"Hard to Do"	Gavin James	Non-album single	check	check	
2017	"Just for Us"	Francis and the Lights	Just for Us	check	check	
2017	"Back in Time"	Francis and the Lights	Just for Us	check		
2017	"I Won't Lie to You"	Francis and the Lights	Just for Us	check		
2017	"Breaking Up"	Francis and the Lights	Just for Us	check		
2017	"Never Go Back"	Francis and the Lights	Just for Us	check	check	
2018	"Parallel Line" RIAA: Gold	Keith Urban	Graffiti U RIAA: Gold	check	check	
2018	"Buttcheeks"	6 Dogs	Non-album single	check	check	
2018	"Hypnotized"	Tory Lanez	Memories Don't Die	check	check	
2018	"Do Not Disturb"	Trill Sammy	Non-album single	check	check	
2018	"Freaky Friday" RIAA: 5× Platinum	Lil Dicky	Non-album single	check	check	check
2018	"Thru Your Phone" RIAA: 2× Platinum	Cardi B	Invasion of Privacy RIAA: 4× Platinum	check	check	
2018	"2002" RIAA: 2× Platinum	Anne-Marie	Speak Your Mind RIAA: Platinum	check		
2018	"Black & White" RIAA: 4× Platinum	Juice WRLD	Goodbye & Good Riddance RIAA: 5× Platinum	check	check	
2018	"Nervous"	The Neighbourhood	Hard to Imagine the Neighbourhood Ever Changing	check	check	
2018	"I Thought About Killing You" RIAA: Gold	Kanye West	ye RIAA: Platinum	check	check	
2018	"Ghost Town" RIAA: 2× Platinum	Kanye West	ye RIAA: Platinum		check	
2018	"Feel the Love" RIAA: Gold	Kids See Ghosts	Kids See Ghosts RIAA: Gold	check	check	
2018	"Reborn" RIAA: Platinum	Kids See Ghosts	Kids See Ghosts RIAA: Gold	check	check	
2018	"Not for Radio"	Nas	NASIR	check	check	
2018	"everything"	Nas	NASIR	check	check	
2018	"Eastside (featuring Halsey and Khalid)" RIAA: 7× Platinum	Benny Blanco	Friends Keep Secrets; RIAA: Platinum	check	check	check
2018	"Roses (with Juice WRLD featuring Brendon Urie)" RIAA: 2× Platinum	Benny Blanco	Friends Keep Secrets; RIAA: Platinum	check	check	check
2018	"Just for Us pt. 2"	Benny Blanco	Friends Keep Secrets; RIAA: Platinum	check	check	check
2018	"I Found You (with Calvin Harris)"	Benny Blanco	Friends Keep Secrets; RIAA: Platinum	check	check	check
2018	"Better to Lie (with Jesse & Swae Lee)"	Benny Blanco	Friends Keep Secrets; RIAA: Platinum	check	check	check
2018	"More/Diamond Ring (featuring Ty Dolla $ign & 6LACK)"	Benny Blanco	Friends Keep Secrets; RIAA: Platinum	check	check	check
2018	"Break My Heart (featuring Ryan Beatty)"	Benny Blanco	Friends Keep Secrets; RIAA: Platinum	check	check	check
2019	"I Found You / Nilda's Story (with Calvin Harris & Miguel)"	Benny Blanco	Non-album single	check	check	
2019	"Earth" RIAA: Platinum	Lil Dicky	Non-album single	check	check	
2019	"Nightmare" RIAA: 2× Platinum	Halsey	Non-album single	check	check	check
2019	"Señorita" RIAA: 5× Platinum	Shawn Mendes & Camila Cabello	Shawn Mendes (Deluxe)	check	check	
2019	"Best Part of Me"	Ed Sheeran, YEBBA	No.6 Collaborations Project	check	check	
2019	"Take Me to the Light"	Francis and the Lights, Bon Iver, Kanye West	Take Me to the Light	check	check	
2019	"Graduation (with Juice WRLD)" RIAA: 2× Platinum	Benny Blanco & Juice Wrld	Non-album single	check	check	
2019	"Back For You"	Cashmere Cat	Princess Catgirl	check	check	
2019	"Emotions"	Cashmere Cat	Princess Catgirl	check	check	
2019	"For Your Eyes Only"	Cashmere Cat	Princess Catgirl	check	check	
2019	"Moo"	Cashmere Cat	Princess Catgirl	check	check	
2019	"Watergirl"	Cashmere Cat	Princess Catgirl	check	check	
2019	"Without You"	Cashmere Cat	Princess Catgirl	check	check	
2019	"Mary Magdalene"	FKA Twigs	MAGDALENE	check	check	
2019	"Sad Day"	FKA Twigs	MAGDALENE	check	check	
2020	"Ashley"	Halsey	Manic; RIAA: 2× Platinum	check	check	
2020	"Erase U"	The Kid LAROI	Fuck Love; RIAA: 3× Platinum	check	check	
2020	"Lonely" RIAA: 2× Platinum	Justin Bieber & Benny Blanco	Friends Keep Secrets 2 RIAA: Platinum	check	check	check
2021	"You"	Benny Blanco, Marshmello, Vance Joy	Friends Keep Secrets 2 RIAA: Platinum	check	check	check
2021	"Lost"	Benny Blanco, 6 Dogs	Friends Keep Secrets 2 RIAA: Platinum	check	check	check
2021	"Real Shit"	Benny Blanco, Juice Wrld	Friends Keep Secrets 2 RIAA: Platinum	check	check	check
2021	"Care"	Benny Blanco, Omar Apollo	Friends Keep Secrets 2 RIAA: Platinum	check	check	check
2021	"Obsessed"	Addison Rae	Non-album single	check	check	
2022	"Living Hell"	Bella Poarch	Dolls	check	check	
2022	"Bad Decisions" RIAA: Gold	Benny Blanco, BTS, Snoop Dogg	Non-album single	check	check	
2022	"Bad Decisions" (Acoustic)	Benny Blanco, BTS, Snoop Dogg	Non-album single	check	check	
2022	"Grrrls"	Lizzo	Special	check	check	
2022	"Special" RIAA: Platinum	SZA	SOS; RIAA: 6× Platinum	check	check	
2022	"Nobody Gets Me" RIAA: 3× Platinum	SZA	SOS; RIAA: 6× Platinum	check	check	
2023	"Moonlight" RIAA: 2× Platinum	Kali Uchis	Red Moon in Venus RIAA: Gold	check	check	
2023	"Count of Three (You can eat $#@!)	Underscores	Non-album single	check		
2023	"Die 4 Me"	Halsey	Non-album single	check	check	
2023	"Single Soon"	Selena Gomez	Non-album single	check	check	
2023	"The World Is Blind"	Abu	Non-album single	check	check	
2023	"Lace It"	Juice WRLD & Eminem"	The Party Never Ends	check	check	
2023	“Mr. McAdams”	Lil Dicky	Penith	check	check	check
2023	"Ally’s Song"	Lil Dicky	Penith			check
2023	"Burst"	Lil Dicky	Penith	check	check	check
2023	"Second Coming"	Lil Dicky	Penith	check	check	check
2023	"I Love Myself"	Lil Dicky	Penith	check	check	check
2023	"Kareem Abdul-Jabbar"	Lil Dicky	Penith	check	check	check
2023	"Going Gray"	Lil Dicky	Penith	check	check	check
2023	"YG Interlude"	Lil Dicky	Penith	check	check	check
2023	"No Fruits or Vegetables"	Lil Dicky	Penith	check	check	check
2023	"I'm Drunk"	Lil Dicky	Penith	check	check	check
2023	"Jail (Part 1)"	Lil Dicky	Penith		check	check
2023	"We Good " (featuring GaTa)	Lil Dicky	Penith	check	check	check
2023	"Brand New"	Lil Dicky	Penith			check
2023	"Honestly"	Lil Dicky	Penith			check
2023	"HAHAHA"	Lil Dicky	Penith			check
2023	"Harrison Ave"	Lil Dicky	Penith			check
2023	"I Met a Girl"	Lil Dicky	Penith			check
2023	"Morning After"	Lil Dicky	Penith			check
2023	"My D!ck Sucks"	Lil Dicky	Penith			check
2023	"Still Freestyling (Outro)"	Lil Dicky	Penith			check
2023	"Hearsay"	Lil Dicky	Penith			check
2023	"Hi, I'm Dave (From DAVE)"	Lil Dicky	Penith			check
2024	"Quédate Bebé"	Grupo Frontera	Jugando a Que No Pasa Nada	check		
2024	"lock/unlock"	j-hope	Hope on the Street Vol. 1	check	check	
2024	"Go On"	Sia	Reasonable Woman	check	check	
2024	"Somebody Save Me"	Eminem, Jelly Roll	The Death of Slim Shady (Coup De Grâce)	check	check	
2024	"DEGENERE"	Myke Towers	Non-album single	check	check	
2024	"What Do I Do"	SZA	SOS Deluxe: LANA	check	check	
2025	"I Said I Loved You First"	Selena Gomez & Benny Blanco	I Said I Love You First	check	check	
2025	"Younger and Hotter Than Me"	Selena Gomez & Benny Blanco	I Said I Love You First	check	check	
2025	"Call Me When You Break Up"	Selena Gomez, benny blanco, Gracie Abrams	I Said I Love You First	check	check	
2025	"Ojos Tristes"	Selena Gomez & Benny Blanco, The Marías	I Said I Love You First	check	check	
2025	"Don't Wanna Cry"	Selena Gomez, Benny Blanco	I Said I Love You First	check	check	
2025	"Sunset Blvd"	Selena Gomez & Benny Blanco	I Said I Love You First	check	check	
2025	"Cowboy"	Selena Gomez & Benny Blanco	I Said I Love You First	check	check	
2025	"Bluest Flame"	Selena Gomez & Benny Blanco	I Said I Love You First	check	check	
2025	"How Does It Feel to Be Forgotten"	Selena Gomez & Benny Blanco	I Said I Love You First	check	check	
2025	“Do You Want To Be Perfect”	Selena Gomez & Benny Blanco	I Said I Love You First	check	check	
2025	“You Said You Were Sorry”	Selena Gomez & Benny Blanco	I Said I Love You First	check	check	
2025	"I Can't Get Enough" RIAA: Gold	Benny Blanco, Tainy, J Balvin, Selena Gomez	I Said I Love You First	check	check	check
2025	"Don't Take It Personally"	Selena Gomez & Benny Blanco	I Said I Love You First	check	check	
2025	"Scared Of Loving You"	Selena Gomez & Benny Blanco	I Said I Love You First	check	check	
2025	"Nobody New"	The Marías		check	check	
2025	"Talk"	Selena Gomez & Benny Blanco	I Said I Love You First...And You Said It Back	check	check	
2025	"Bluest Flame (DJ Sliink Remix)"	Selena Gomez & Benny Blanco	I Said I Love You First...And You Said It Back	check	check	
2025	"How Does It Feel To Be Forgotten (Live From Vevo)"	Selena Gomez & Benny Blanco	I Said I Love You First...And You Said It Back	check	check	
2025	"Call Me When You Break Up (Acoustic Version)"	Selena Gomez, Benny Blanco & Gracie Abrams	I Said I Love You First...And You Said It Back	check	check	
2025	"Cowboy (GloRilla Remix)"	Selena Gomez & Benny Blanco	I Said I Love You First...And You Said It Back	check	check	
2025	"Guess You Could Say I'm In Love"	Selena Gomez & Benny Blanco	I Said I Love You First...And You Said It Back	check	check	
2025	"Scared Of Loving You (Live From Vevo)"	Selena Gomez & Benny Blanco	I Said I Love You First...And You Said It Back	check	check	
2025	"That's When I'll Care"	Selena Gomez & Benny Blanco	I Said I Love You First...And You Said It Back	check	check	
2025	"Pretty Promises, (feat. Mariah The Scientist)	Kali Uchis		check	check	
2025	"Perro Fiel"	Netón Vega and benny blanco	DELIRIUM	check	check	
2025	"906090"	Netón Vega	DELIRIUM	check	check	
2025	"Nachica"	Netón Vega	DELIRIUM	check	check	
2026	"Butterflies"	Brent Faiyaz		check	check	
2026	"Other Side"	Brent Faiyaz		check	check	
2026	"Te Olvido (La La)	benny blanco, Selena Gomez, Becky G	Hermoso	check	check	
2026	"Joven y Salvaje"	benny blanco and Bb trickz	Hermoso	check	check	
2026	"Un Poco Perdido"	benny blanco and Neton Vega	Hermoso	check	check	
2026	"Memoria De Paz"	benny blanco and The Marías	Hermoso	check	check	
2026	"Te Amo"	benny blanco	Hermoso	check	check	
2026	"Cinco"	benny blanco	Hermoso	check		
2026	"Ay Bendito"	benny blanco, Mora and Ovy On The Drums	Hermoso	check	check	
2026	"Degenere"	benny blanco and Myke Towers	Hermoso	check	check	

== Single peaks ==
The following singles peaked inside the top ten on the Billboard Hot 100, Hot 100 Airplay (Radio Songs) and/or the UK Singles Chart.

- 2008: "I Kissed a Girl" (Katy Perry) number one
- 2008: "Hot n Cold" (Katy Perry) number one
- 2008: "Circus" (Britney Spears)
- 2009: "Don't Trust Me" (3OH!3) number one
- 2009: "Tik Tok" (Ke$ha) number one
- 2010: "Eenie Meenie" (Sean Kingston and Justin Bieber)
- 2010: "Blah Blah Blah" (Ke$ha featuring 3OH!3)
- 2010: "Your Love Is My Drug" (Ke$ha) number one
- 2010: "My First Kiss" (3OH!3 featuring Ke$ha)
- 2010: "California Gurls" (Katy Perry featuring Snoop Dogg) number one
- 2010: "Please Don't Go" (Mike Posner)
- 2010: "Dynamite" (Taio Cruz) number one
- 2010: "Teenage Dream" (Katy Perry) number one
- 2010: "We R Who We R" (Ke$ha) number one
- 2010: "Teenage Dream" (Glee Cast)
- 2011: "Blow" (Ke$ha)
- 2011: "No Sleep" (Wiz Khalifa)
- 2011: "Stereo Hearts" (Gym Class Heroes featuring Adam Levine) number one
- 2011: "Ass Back Home" (Gym Class Heroes featuring Neon Hitch)
- 2011: "Moves like Jagger" (Maroon 5 featuring Christina Aguilera) number one
- 2012: "Payphone" (Maroon 5 and Wiz Khalifa) number one
- 2012: "Work Hard, Play Hard" (Wiz Khalifa)
- 2012: "Heart Attack" (Trey Songz)
- 2012: "Die Young" (Ke$ha) number one
- 2012: "Diamonds" (Rihanna) number one
- 2013: "Other Side of Love" (Sean Paul)
- 2014: "If I Lose Myself" (OneRepublic)
- 2014: "Me and My Broken Heart" (Rixton) number one
- 2014: "Maps" (Maroon 5) number one
- 2014: "Animals" (Maroon 5) number one
- 2014: "Black Widow" (Iggy Azalea featuring Rita Ora) number one
- 2014: "Don't" (Ed Sheeran) number one
- 2015: "Fire and the Flood" (Vance Joy) number one
- 2015: "Same Old Love" (Selena Gomez) number one
- 2015: "Love Yourself" (Justin Bieber) number one
- 2016: "Cold Water" (Major Lazer featuring Justin Bieber and MØ) number one
- 2016: "Luv" (Tory Lanez) number one
- 2016: "Don't Wanna Know" (Maroon 5 featuring Kendrick Lamar) number one
- 2017: "Castle on the Hill" (Ed Sheeran)
- 2017: "Lonely Together" (Avicii)
- 2017: "Perfect" (Ed Sheeran) number one
- 2018: "Freaky Friday" (Lil Dicky) number one
- 2018: "2002" (Anne-Marie)
- 2018: "Eastside" (Benny Blanco) number one
- 2019: "Señorita" (Shawn Mendes and Camila Cabello) number one
- 2020: "Lonely" (Justin Bieber & Benny Blanco) number one
- 2022: "Bad Decisions" (Benny Blanco, BTS & Snoop Dogg)
