= Real Shit =

2020 single by Juice Wrld and Benny Blanco

Single by Juice Wrld and Benny Blanco

from the album Friends Keep Secrets 2
- Released: December 2, 2020
- Genre: Pop-punk; trap
- Length: 3:03
- Label: Grade A; Interscope
- Songwriters: Jarad Higgins; Benjamin Levin; Jack Karaszewski; Dylan Brady; Henry Kwapis; Magnus Høiberg
- Producers: Benny Blanco; Cashmere Cat; Henry Kwapis; Jack Karaszewski; Dylan Brady

Juice Wrld singles chronology
"Smile" (2020)	"Real Shit" (2020)	"Reminds Me of You" (2020)

Benny Blanco singles chronology
"Lonely" (2020)	"Real Shit" (2020)	"You" (2021)

"Real Shit" is a song by American rapper Juice Wrld and American record producer Benny Blanco. It was written by Juice Wrld alongside producers Blanco, Cashmere Cat, Dylan Brady, Henry Kwapis, and Jack Karaszewski. It was released to digital retailers as a single by Grade A Productions and Interscope Records on December 2, 2020. It was included as part of the reissue of Blanco's debut studio album Friends Keep Secrets, released in 2021.

== Background ==
"Real Shit" was released on what would have been Juice Wrld's twenty-second birthday. While Juice and Blanco have collaborated in the past on "Graduation" and "Roses", Blanco revealed that the posthumous song was the first song they recorded, although the commercial release is an updated version of the original recording with more musicians contributing to the production.

My friend played me a song like 2 or 3 years ago, I looked at him and said it was one of the best songs I had ever heard. My friend didn't even know the artists name, said it was Juice or something, I searched and searched on Instagram until I came across Juice's page, he had 9K followers at the time. I DMed him and said we had to work, he said he was coming to LA in a week and we could go in then. I booked us a studio, he didn't even have a record deal. Labels were coming to the session all night trying to butter him up and offer him anything he wanted. He didn’t give a fuck, he just wanted to make music.

— Benny Blanco, in an Instagram post.

They made about six songs on the first night, including "Roses" and "Real Shit", the latter of which was "the first time [Blanco] saw [Juice's] magic". Blanco said that "the whole room dropped their jaws and watched [Juice] in awe", knowing that they "were in the room with a man who was going to change music forever". Juice went in the vocal booth and recorded the entire song in one take, then he did it three more times and said: "Pick the best one". Blanco said that "they were all perfect songs".

== Release ==
"Real Shit" was first teased on November 30, 2020. Blanco posted a short instrumental snippet on social media which featured an animated version of the single cover art and a caption which reads "tomorrow", along with an old picture of him and Wrld cracking up. On December 2, 2020, a lyric video for the song was released on YouTube.

== Composition ==
"Real Shit" is a pop-punk and trap song with a length of three minutes and three seconds. Lyrically, Juice reflects on his life, celebrating happier moments and counting his blessings.

== Credits and personnel ==
Credits adapted from Tidal.

- Juice Wrld – songwriting, rap vocals
- Benny Blanco – songwriting, production, keyboards, mixing
- Cashmere Cat – songwriting, production, keyboards, programming
- Dylan Brady – songwriting, production, guitar, keyboards, programming
- Henry Kwapis – songwriting, production, keyboards, programming
- Jack Karaszewski – songwriting, production, guitar, keyboards, programming
- Chris Gehringer – mastering

== Charts ==
Chart performance for "Real Shit"
Chart (2020–2021)	Peak position
Australia (ARIA)	52
Belgium (Ultratip Bubbling Under Flanders)	34
Global 200 (Billboard)	79
Canada Hot 100 (Billboard)	52
Ireland (IRMA)	57
New Zealand Hot Singles (RMNZ)	4
Portugal (AFP)	159
Sweden Heatseeker (Sverigetopplistan)	1
UK Singles (Official Charts)	75
US Billboard Hot 100	72
US Hot R&B/Hip-Hop Songs (Billboard)	18
US Rolling Stone Top 100	67
