= You (Benny Blanco, Marshmello and Vance Joy song) =

2021 single by Benny Blanco, Marshmello and Vance Joy

Single by Benny Blanco, Marshmello and Vance Joy

from the album Friends Keep Secrets 2
- Released: January 29, 2021
- Genre: EDM; pop rock; indie folk
- Length: 2:49
- Label: Interscope; Friends Keep Secrets; Joytime Collective
- Songwriters: Benjamin Levin; Christopher Comstock; James Keogh; Blake Slatkin; Caroline Pennell
- Producers: Benny Blanco; Marshmello; Blake Slatkin

Benny Blanco singles chronology
"Real Shit" (2020)	"You" (2021)	"Unlearn" (2021)

Marshmello singles chronology
"Too Much" (2020)	"You" (2021)	"Lavandia" (2021)

Vance Joy singles chronology
"I'm with You" (2018)	"You" (2021)	"Missing Piece" (2021)

Music video
- "You" on YouTube

"You" is a song by American record producer Benny Blanco, American DJ Marshmello, and Australian singer Vance Joy. It was released through Interscope Records, Blanco's Friends Keep Secrets and Mello's Joytime Collective on January 29, 2021. It was written alongside Caroline Pennell and Blake Slatkin, the latter producing the song with the DJs. The song was included on the 2021 reissue of Blanco's debut studio album Friends Keep Secrets.

At the APRA Music Awards of 2022, the song was nominated for Most Performed Pop Work.

== Background ==
The song was announced on January 22. In a statement Blanco said that he has been friends with Vance Joy and Marshmello for a long time and that it was the right time to do something together. Marshmello added that "Benny showed me this demo in his studio one day" and "I was instantly drawn to the song and knew I had to try something a little different with it. I sent my initial idea to Benny and from there we went back and forth until we created what everyone can hear right now".

== Critical reception ==
"You" received positive criticism from music critics. Alexander Costello of We Rave You opined that the song "is a refreshing track that embodies soft melodies and a charming character [...]. With Joy's vocals [...], the track discharges a delightful mid-section and chorus that gets better and better with every listen". uDiscoverMusic critic Sam Armstrong described that "this collaboration brings out the best in each artist, fusing Blanco's easy popcraft, Marshmello's slick production, and Joy's buoyant vocals".

== Music video ==
The video, directed by William Child, shows an animation made of clay of the three artists at a picnic until Marshmello and Vance Joy are kidnapped by a green monster. Blanco tracks them down, but when he confronts the kidnapper, he hugs the monster instead, and they all end up hanging out together and enjoying joints in the hot tub and playing some pool, and then say goodbye to him.

== Credits and personnel ==
Credits adapted from Tidal.

- Vance Joy – lead vocals, songwriter
- Benny Blanco – producer, songwriter, keyboard, programming, recording engineer
- Marshmello – producer, songwriter, keyboard, programming
- Blake Slatkin – songwriter, guitar, keyboard, programming, recording engineer
- Caroline Pennell – songwriter
- Dan Higgins – baritone saxophone, tenor saxophone
- Sean Hurley – bass guitar
- John Hanes – engineer
- Serban Ghenea – engineer, mixer
- Jerry Hey – horn arranger
- Chris Gehringer – mastering
- Bill Reichenbach Jr. – trombone
- Wayne Bergeron – trumpet

== Charts ==
=== Weekly charts ===
Weekly chart performance for "You"
Chart (2021)	Peak position
Australia (ARIA)	55
Belgium (Ultratip Bubbling Under Flanders)	3
Global 200 (Billboard)	167
Canada Hot 100 (Billboard)	62
Canada Rock (Billboard)	47
Germany (Deutsche Single Trend Charts)	10
Ireland (IRMA)	77
Lithuania (AGATA)	61
Netherlands (Dutch Top 40 Tipparade)	26
Netherlands Single Tip (MegaCharts)	22
New Zealand Hot Singles (RMNZ)	2
Sweden (Sverigetopplistan)	38
Switzerland Airplay (Schweizer Hitparade)	69
US Hot Rock & Alternative Songs (Billboard)	12
US Rock & Alternative Airplay (Billboard)	18

=== Year-end charts ===
Year-end chart performance for "You"
Chart (2021)	Position
US Hot Rock & Alternative Songs (Billboard)	87

== Release history ==
Release history for "You"
Region	Date	Format	Label	Ref.
Various	January 29, 2021	Digital download; streaming	Interscope; Friends Keep Secrets; Joytime Collective	
