= LA Confidential (song) =

Single by Tory Lanez
- Released: January 29, 2016
- Genre: R&B; rap rock
- Length: 2:54
- Label: Mad Love; Interscope
- Songwriters: Daystar Peterson; Benjamin Levin; Miguel Pimentel; Andrew Wansel; Magnus Høiberg; Autoro Whitfield
- Producers: Cashmere Cat; Benny Blanco; Pop; Toro

Tory Lanez singles chronology
"Drifting" (2015)	"LA Confidential" (2016)	"Tim Duncan" (2016)

"LA Confidential" is a song by Canadian Singer Tory Lanez. The song was released on January 29, 2016 by Mad Love Records and Interscope Records. The song is produced by Benny Blanco, Cashmere Cat, Pop and Toro.

== Critical reception ==
"LA Confidential" received positive reviews from music critics. Rap-Up wrote, "the Toronto singer-rapper keeps it real with his girl on the rock-edged jam, singing about remaining faithful in a relationship". Paul Thompson of XXL opined that the song "invokes a town with an entirely different cache" and "is exactly the kind of slinking cut that Lanez would hope to leverage into mainstream success in 2016".

== Music video ==
On March 30, 2016, a 15-second teaser of the music video was released. The video premiered on MTV on April 1, 2016, and was uploaded on Lanez's VEVO channel on the same day.

== Charts ==
=== Weekly charts ===
Chart (2016)	Peak position
US Bubbling Under Hot 100 (Billboard)	24
US Hot R&B/Hip-Hop Songs (Billboard)	43

== Certifications ==
Region	Certification	Certified units/sales
United States (RIAA)	Gold	500,000^{‡}
^{‡} Sales+streaming figures based on certification alone.
