= I Found You (Benny Blanco and Calvin Harris song) =

2018 single by Benny Blanco and Calvin Harris

Single by Benny Blanco and Calvin Harris

from the album Friends Keep Secrets
- Released: November 2, 2018
- Recorded: October 2018
- Genre: Dance-pop; house; nu-disco
- Length: 3:11
- Label: Friends Keep Secrets; Interscope
- Songwriters: Benjamin Levin; Adam Wiles; Wayne Hector
- Producers: Benny Blanco; Calvin Harris

Benny Blanco singles chronology
"Eastside" (2018)	"I Found You" (2018)	"Better to Lie" (2018)

Calvin Harris singles chronology
"Promises" (2018)	"I Found You" (2018)	"Checklist" (2018)

Music video
- "I Found You" on YouTube

"I Found You" is a song by American producer Benny Blanco and Scottish DJ Calvin Harris. It was released as a single on November 2, 2018. Blanco first mentioned the collaboration in an interview with the British radio show The EE Official Big Top 40 in August 2018, and officially confirmed it through his Twitter in October. It follows Blanco's single "Eastside" and Harris's "Promises", which both reached number one in the UK. Harris provides vocals on the track, making it his first single since "My Way" in 2016 to feature his own voice.

On 4 January 2019, Blanco and Harris released a charity version of the track entitled "I Found You/Nilda’s Story" with Miguel.

== Background ==
Blanco previously stated that he has been a fan of Harris since 2007, and that he "was always attracted to how much soul and musicality he brought to the table... he also has one of my favorite recorded voices ever.. even tho he thinks it sounds like shit... I love it!" Blanco said that when they decided to work on a song together, Harris initially resisted the idea of singing on it but Blanco "wore [him] down" and he agreed.

== Promotion ==
Blanco posted a video on Instagram of himself listening back to the master of the song on his computer, revealing the title as "I Found You". Harris also mentioned the upcoming release on his social media accounts in a post that included a picture of Blanco and himself.

== Track listing ==
Digital download
No.	Title	Length
1.	"I Found You"	3:11

== Charts ==
=== Weekly charts ===
Chart (2018–2019)	Peak position
Australia (ARIA)	54
Belgium (Ultratip Bubbling Under Flanders)	12
Belgium (Ultratop 50 Wallonia)	19
Canada Hot 100 (Billboard)	95
CIS Airplay (TopHit)	8
Croatia (HRT)	32
Czech Republic Singles Digital (ČNS IFPI)	60
Greece International Digital Singles (IFPI)	73
Hungary (Rádiós Top 40)	28
Ireland (IRMA)	24
Israel (Media Forest TV Airplay)	1
Netherlands (Dutch Top 40)	35
New Zealand Hot Singles (RMNZ)	3
Poland Airplay (ZPAV)	62
Portugal (AFP)	78
Russia Airplay (TopHit)	7
Scottish Singles Sales (Official Charts)	43
Slovakia Singles Digital (ČNS IFPI)	64
Sweden (Sverigetopplistan)	86
UK Singles (Official Charts)	29
Ukraine Airplay (TopHit)	25
US Dance Club Songs (Billboard)	23
US Hot Dance/Electronic Songs (Billboard)	9
US Pop Airplay (Billboard)	37

=== Year-end charts ===
Chart (2019)	Position
CIS (Tophit)	61
Russia Airplay (Tophit)	54
US Hot Dance/Electronic Songs (Billboard)	25

== Certifications ==
Region	Certification	Certified units/sales
Brazil (Pro-Música Brasil)	Platinum	40,000^{‡}
New Zealand (RMNZ)	Platinum	30,000^{‡}
United Kingdom (BPI)	Silver	200,000^{‡}
^{‡} Sales+streaming figures based on certification alone.

== Release history ==
Region	Date	Format	Label	Ref.
Various	November 2, 2018	Digital download	Friends Keep Secrets; Interscope	
Italy	November 11, 2018	Contemporary hit radio	Sony	
United States	November 13, 2018	Contemporary hit radio	Interscope	
United Kingdom	November 30, 2018	Contemporary hit radio	Sony; Columbia	

== I Found You / Nilda's Story ==
"I Found You / Nilda’s Story"

Single by Benny Blanco, Calvin Harris and Miguel
- Released: January 4, 2019
- Length: 3:11 (single version); 5:23 (video version)
- Label: Friends Keep Secrets; Interscope
- Songwriters: Benny Blanco; Adam Wiles
- Producers: Benny Blanco; Calvin Harris; Thomas Bartlett

Benny Blanco singles chronology
"Roses" (2018)	"I Found You / Nilda’s Story" (2019)	"I Can't Get Enough" (2019)

Calvin Harris singles chronology
"Checklist" (2018)	"I Found You / Nilda’s Story" (2019)	"Giant" (2019)

Miguel singles chronology
"Banana Clip" (2018)	"I Found You / Nilda’s Story" (2019)	"Show Me Love" (2019)

Music video
- "I Found You/Nilda’s Story" on YouTube

On January 4, 2019, Blanco released an acoustic version of the track with American R&B singer Miguel.

=== Music video ===
The music video was released on January 4, 2019.

=== Track listing ===
Digital download
No.	Title	Length
1.	"I Found You / Nilda’s Story" (with Calvin Harris and Miguel)	3:11

=== Release history ===
Region	Date	Format	Label	Ref.
Worldwide	January 4, 2019	Digital download	Friends Keep Secrets; Interscope	
