= Friends Keep Secrets =

Studio album by Benny Blanco
- Released: December 7, 2018
- Genre: Pop; hip-hop
- Length: 21:43
- Label: Friends Keep Secrets; Interscope
- Producer: Benny Blanco; Watt; Cashmere Cat; Happy Perez; Calvin Harris; Two Inch Punch

Benny Blanco chronology
Bangers & Cash (2007)	Friends Keep Secrets (2018)	I Said I Love You First (2025)

Singles from Friends Keep Secrets
- 1. "Eastside" Released: July 12, 2018; 2. "I Found You" Released: November 2, 2018; 3. "Better to Lie" Released: November 30, 2018; 4. "Roses" Released: December 5, 2018

Singles from Friends Keep Secrets 2
- 1. "Graduation" Released: August 2, 2019; 2. "Lonely" Released: October 15, 2020; 3. "Real Shit" Released: December 2, 2020; 4. "You" Released: January 29, 2021; 5. "Unlearn" Released: March 24, 2021

Friends Keep Secrets is the debut studio album by American record producer Benny Blanco, released on December 7, 2018. It shares its name with Blanco's imprint of Interscope Records, through which it was released. It was preceded by four singles: "Eastside", "I Found You", "Better to Lie", and "Roses". A reissue of the album was released on March 26, 2021. It features guest appearances by Halsey, Khalid, Juice Wrld, Brendon Urie, Jesse, Swae Lee, Ty Dolla Sign, 6lack, Ryan Beatty, Justin Bieber, 6 Dogs, Gracie Abrams, Vance Joy and Omar Apollo.

== Promotion ==
On December 6, 2018, Blanco announced on his Instagram story that he was "releasing an album Friday", later posting that he was "still working on the track list" as he had just finished. He also announced his intention to host a "really small BBQ for fans in the LA area" to play his album.

== Track listing ==
Friends Keep Secrets track listing
No.	Title	Writer(s)	Producer(s)	Length
1.	"Eastside" (with Halsey and Khalid)	Benjamin Levin; Edward Christopher Sheeran; Nathan Perez; Ashley Frangipane; Khalid Robinson	Andrew Watt; Benny Blanco; Cashmere Cat; Happy Perez	2:50
2.	"Roses" (with Juice Wrld featuring Brendon Urie)	Levin; Magnus August Høiberg; Perez; Brendon Urie; Jarad Higgins	Blanco; Cashmere Cat; Happy Perez	3:43
3.	"Just for Us, Pt. 2"	Levin; Høiberg; Perez; Aaron Lammer; Brandon Joyner Burton; Francis Farewell Starlite; Justin Vernon	Blanco; Cashmere Cat; Perez^{[a]}	1:55
4.	"I Found You" (with Calvin Harris)	Levin; Adam Wiles	Blanco; Calvin Harris	3:09
5.	"Better to Lie" (with Jesse and Swae Lee)	Levin; Høiberg; Perez; Ammar Malik; Jacob Kasher Hindlin; Jesse Rutherford; John Ryan; Kahlif Brown	Blanco; Cashmere Cat^{[a]}; Perez^{[a]}	2:55
6.	"More / Diamond Ring" (featuring Ty Dolla Sign and 6lack)	Levin; Høiberg; Perez; Rutherford; Ricardo Valentine; Romy Madley Croft; Tyrone Griffin Jr.	Blanco; Cashmere Cat; Perez	3:02
7.	"Break My Heart" (featuring Ryan Beatty)	Levin; Benjamin Ross Ash; Høiberg; Perez; Poor Riley; Ryan Beatty	Blanco; Two Inch Punch	4:09
Total length:				21:43

Friends Keep Secrets 2 disc one track listing
No.	Title	Writer(s)	Producer(s)	Length
1.	"Lonely" (with Justin Bieber)	Justin Bieber; Levin; Finneas O'Connell	Blanco; Finneas	2:29
2.	"Lost" (with 6 Dogs)	Levin; Henry Kwapis; Jack Karaszewski; Høiberg; Ronald Chase Amick	Blanco; Cashmere Cat; Henry Kwapis; Jack Karaszewski	3:27
3.	"Unlearn" (with Gracie Abrams)	Levin; Blake Slatkin; Gracie Abrams; Kwapis; Karaszewski; Julia Michaels; Høiberg; Michael Pollack	Blanco; Blake Slatkin; Cashmere Cat; Kwapis; Karaszewski	2:34
4.	"Real Shit" (with Juice Wrld)	Levin; Dylan Brady; Kwapis; Karaszewski; Higgins; Høiberg	Blanco; Cashmere Cat; Dylan Brady; Kwapis; Karaszewski	3:03
5.	"You" (with Marshmello and Vance Joy)	Levin; Slatkin; Caroline Pennell; Christopher Comstock; James Keogh	Blanco; Marshmello; Slatkin^{[a]}	2:49
6.	"Graduation" (with Juice Wrld)	Levin; Colleen Fitzpatrick; Higgins; Josh Deutsch; Høiberg; Perez	Blanco; Cashmere Cat; Perez	2:57
7.	"Care" (with Omar Apollo)	Levin; Slatkin; Kwapis; Karaszewski; Omar Apollo	Blanco; Slatkin; Kwapis; Karaszewski	4:50

Friends Keep Secrets 2 – Apple Music bonus videos track listing
No.	Title	Director	Length
15.	"Lonely" (with Justin Bieber)	Jake Schreier	2:37
16.	"Unlearn" (with Gracie Abrams)	Schreier	2:36
17.	"You" (with Marshmello and Vance Joy)	William Child	2:50
18.	"Graduation" (with Juice Wrld)	Schreier	4:06
19.	"Eastside" (with Halsey and Khalid)	Schreier	2:53
20.	"I Found You" (with Calvin Harris)	Schreier	3:13

Notes

- ^{^[a]} indicates an additional producer.
- Disc two of the reissue contains the tracks listed on the original release.

== Personnel ==
Musicians

- Benny Blanco – keyboards (1–3, 6, 7), programming (1–3, 5–7), guitar (5)
- Happy Perez – guitar (1, 3, 5, 6), keyboards (2, 5), programming (1–3, 5–7)
- Andrew Watt – guitar, programming (1)
- Cashmere Cat – keyboards, programming (1–3, 5–7)
- Khalid – vocals (1)
- Halsey – vocals (1)
- Brendon Urie – vocals (2)
- Juice Wrld – vocals (2)
- Francis and the Lights – vocals (3)
- Justin Vernon – vocals (3)
- Calvin Harris – vocals (4)
- John Ryan – background vocals (5)
- Ammar Malik – guitar (5)
- Jesse – vocals (5), additional vocals (6)
- Swae Lee – vocals (5)
- Ryan Beatty – additional vocals (6), vocals (7)
- Romy – guitar (6)
- 6lack – vocals (6)
- Ty Dolla Sign – vocals (6)
- Sandra Levin – additional vocals (7)
- Poor Riley – guitar (7)
- Phil Peterson – strings (7)
- Victoria Parker – violin (7)

Technical

- Serban Ghenea – mixer (1, 5)
- Benny Blanco – mixer (2, 3, 6, 7), engineer (1–3, 6, 7), mix engineer (2, 3)
- Calvin Harris – mixer, engineer (4)
- David Schwerkolt – engineer (1, 2)
- Chris Sclafani – engineer (1)
- Denis Kosiak – engineer (1)
- Chris Messina – engineer (3)
- Justin Vernon – engineer (3)
- John Ryan – engineer (5)
- Happy Perez – engineer (6, 7)
- James Royo – engineer (6)
- 6lack – engineer (6)
- John Hanes – mix engineer (7), assistant mixer (1)
- Louis Bell – vocal editing (1)
- Alex Layne – assistant recording engineer (2)
- Jeremy Simoneaux – assistant recording engineer (6)

== Charts ==
=== Weekly charts ===
Chart (2018–2021)	Peak position
Australian Albums (ARIA)	39
Canadian Albums (Billboard)	21
Finnish Albums (Suomen virallinen lista)	14
French Albums (SNEP)	160
Irish Albums (IRMA)	74
Latvian Albums (LAIPA)	7
Norwegian Albums (VG-lista)	35
US Billboard 200	41

=== Year-end charts ===
Chart (2019)	Position
US Billboard 200	151

== Certifications ==
Certifications and sales for Friends Keep Secrets
Region	Certification	Certified units/sales
Poland (ZPAV)	Gold	10,000^{‡}
Singapore (RIAS)	Gold	5,000^{*}
United States (RIAA)	Platinum	1,000,000^{‡}
^{*} Sales figures based on certification alone.^{‡} Sales+streaming figures based on certification alone.
