= Graduation (Benny Blanco and Juice Wrld song) =

Single by Benny Blanco and Juice Wrld

Single by Benny Blanco and Juice Wrld

from the album Friends Keep Secrets 2
- Released: August 30, 2019
- Length: 2:57
- Label: Friends Keep Secrets; Interscope
- Songwriters: Benjamin Levin; Jarad Higgins; Magnus Høiberg; Nathan Perez; Colleen Fitzpatrick; Josh Deutsch
- Producers: Benny Blanco; Cashmere Cat; Happy Perez

Benny Blanco singles chronology
"I Can't Get Enough" (2019)	"Graduation" (2019)	"Lonely" (2020)

Juice Wrld singles chronology
"Ransom (Remix)" (2019)	"Graduation" (2019)	"Bandit" (2019)

Music video
- "Graduation" on YouTube

"Graduation" is a song by American record producer Benny Blanco and American rapper Juice Wrld. The song is based on Vitamin C's 2000 hit "Graduation (Friends Forever)".

The song was released on August 30, 2019, and is the second collaboration between the artists since "Roses" in December 2018, which also featured Brendon Urie. It was later included on the reissue of Blanco's debut studio album Friends Keep Secrets, released in 2021.

Juice Wrld's pose in the song's promotional material was later included on the cover art for his first posthumous album, Legends Never Die.

== Music videos ==
=== Official video ===
The music video was released on August 30, 2019, and was directed by Jake Schreier. The video is made up of a montage of students, played by various celebrities, with captions describing how they turned out after high school. Celebrities who make cameos as students in the video include Justice Smith, Hailee Steinfeld, Noah Cyrus, Dove Cameron, Maddie Ziegler, David Dobrik, Madison Beer, and others. Juice Wrld appears in the video as a student named "Gary, whose obsession with video games would cost him his sight" while Benny Blanco plays "Mr. Upchuck", a math teacher who claims to have hooked up with a popular clique at a party. Only Steinfeld appears as herself, and she saves humanity by ending the "Robotic War". Additionally, American comedic rapper Lil Dicky makes an appearance as the principal of the high school.

They are (in order of appearance):

- Hailee Steinfeld as Hailee
- Justice Smith as Jackson
- Dove Cameron as Ashley
- Kaitlyn Dever as Decker
- Noah Cyrus as Becky
- Ross Butler as Scott Hammer
- Tony Revolori as Danny
- Gracie Abrams as Jill
- Nat Wolff as Jasper
- Maddie Ziegler as Kristen
- Juice Wrld as Gary
- Olivia Munn as Greta
- Austin Abrams as Dom
- Tommy Dorfman as Vance
- Peyton List as Jenny
- David Dobrik as Ryan
- Benny Blanco as Mr. Upchuck
- Lil Dicky as Principal Chooke
- Charlotte Lawrence, Madison Beer, Elsie Hewitt and Bianca Finch as The Untouchables

=== Vertical video ===
A vertical video was released on October 4, 2019, which features the characters from the music video in a form of the school yearbook.

== Charts ==
Chart (2019)	Peak position
Canada Hot 100 (Billboard)	90
Ireland (IRMA)	56
New Zealand Hot Singles (RMNZ)	12
UK Singles (Official Charts)	88
US Bubbling Under Hot 100 (Billboard)	8
US Rolling Stone Top 100	77

== Certifications ==
Region	Certification	Certified units/sales
New Zealand (RMNZ)	Gold	15,000^{‡}
United Kingdom (BPI)	Silver	200,000^{‡}
United States (RIAA)	2× Platinum	2,000,000^{‡}
^{‡} Sales+streaming figures based on certification alone.
