= Lonely (Justin Bieber and Benny Blanco song) =

2020 single by Justin Bieber and Benny Blanco

Single by Justin Bieber and Benny Blanco

from the album Justice and Friends Keep Secrets 2
- Released: October 16, 2020
- Genre: Pop
- Length: 2:29
- Label: Def Jam; Interscope; Friends Keep Secrets
- Songwriters: Justin Bieber; Benjamin Levin; Finneas O'Connell
- Producers: Benny Blanco; Finneas

Justin Bieber singles chronology
"Holy" (2020)	"Lonely" (2020)	"Mood (Remix)" (2020)

Benny Blanco singles chronology
"Graduation" (2019)	"Lonely" (2020)	"Real Shit" (2020)

Music video
- "Lonely" on YouTube

"Lonely" is a song by Canadian singer Justin Bieber and American record producer Benny Blanco. It was released through Def Jam Recordings, Interscope Records, and Friends Keep Secrets on October 16, 2020, as the second single from Bieber's sixth studio album, Justice (2021), and was also included on the 2021 reissue of Blanco's debut studio album, Friends Keep Secrets (2018). The song was produced by Blanco and Finneas, who both wrote it alongside Bieber. At the 64th Annual Grammy Awards, "Lonely" received a nomination for Best Pop Duo/Group Performance.

== Background ==
"Lonely" marks the fifth collaboration between Bieber and Blanco, but it is the first where Blanco is credited as an artist. Past Bieber songs where Blanco is credited as a producer and songwriter include "Eenie Meenie" and "Somebody to Love" in 2010, "Love Yourself" in 2015, and "Cold Water" in 2016. "When [Blanco] and [Finneas] showed me this song to be honest it was hard to listen to considering how tough it was to get through some of these chapters," Bieber wrote of the song. At one point, Bieber broke down and cried in the studio. "I went into the studio and sang through it which wasn't easy but started to really see the importance of telling this story! It made me realise we all feel lonely at times! Being someone in my position I believe it is powerful to express vulnerability and that's why I believe this song is so powerful!" Speaking of the song, Blanco revealed that Bieber was "real nervous", and contemplated on whether to release the song. "Because he's like, 'People know me for this thing and it's like I've never been this raw.' He's raw on this song. This song brought us so much closer together. And it was just he's really opening up on this and he's super vulnerable."

== Composition and lyrics ==
"Lonely" is a pop ballad that is set in the key of B minor, vocal range spans from A_{3} to G_{5} with a tempo of 80 beats per minute. It contains a minimalist arrangement and a somber electric piano accompaniment. It has a length of two minutes and twenty-nine seconds. Lyrically, Bieber reflects on the effects of money and fame, as well as the obstacles he faced during his early career, including some perceptions and criticisms he had to deal with as he was gaining fame in his teenage years, and the feelings of isolation and loneliness he experienced as he failed to find anyone who could relate to his situation and provide him with emotional support. He also admits to the wrongdoings he has committed along the way.

== Release and promotion ==
The song was first hinted at by Blanco on October 5, 2020, when he posted a series of pictures on Instagram, including one with his head photoshopped onto Bieber's advertisement for Calvin Klein underwear. There was also a picture of Blanco standing in front of a real-life billboard with the photoshopped ad. On October 9, Bieber posted a short clip on social media, which features himself, Blanco and American rapper Lil Dicky. The post reads: "Next week ..." Blanco posted the full version of that clip, which sees Lil Dicky arriving at Blanco's mansion and being welcomed with an array of odd phrases, before being greeted by Bieber who was awaiting him inside the house. He also teases a release "next week". On October 12, 2020, Bieber and Blanco confirmed the song and its release, along with the artwork and a link for pre-saving the song on digital download and streaming services. He also posted a short snippet of the song on his Instagram Stories, and shared a still from the music video. On October 15, almost a day before the official release time, an early snippet of "Lonely" was made available exclusively in Snapchat's "Featured Sounds" list of its new feature called Sounds, which allows users to add licensed music to their Snaps.

== Commercial performance ==
"Lonely" debuted at number one on the Canadian Hot 100 issued for October 31, 2020. Music Canada certified the song 2× platinum. On the US Billboard Hot 100, it peaked at number 12; it earned a platinum certification from the Recording Industry Association of America (RIAA), which denotes one million units based on sales and track-equivalent on-demand streams. "Lonely" reached number 17 on the UK Singles Chart, and the British Phonographic Industry (BPI) certified it gold. In Australia, the song charted at number 11 and went double platinum. It peaked at number 12 in New Zealand. "Lonely" peaked within the top five of national record charts, at number one in Hungary, Malaysia and Norway, number two in the Netherlands, number four in Denmark and Singapore, and number five in Portugal and Switzerland. The song received a gold certification in Italy, Norway, and Spain, as well as a double platinum certification in Portugal.

== Music video ==
=== Background ===
The music video premiered on YouTube at 9 pm PDT alongside the single on October 15, 2020. It was directed by American music video director Jake Schreier and stars Canadian actor Jacob Tremblay, who plays a younger version of Bieber. In an interview with etalk, Tremblay said that starring in a Justin Bieber music video "is something [he] would have never seen coming". He explained that Bieber's team reached out about the role, and Bieber later texted him to ask if he had any questions. The two ultimately agreed to chat over the phone to address Tremblay's questions, but they did not schedule an exact time, so Bieber ended up calling him when he was in a grocery store. "I was like, to my parents, 'I have to go outside because Justin Bieber's calling me.'" Tremblay also revealed that he was nervous about starring in the video, because he had never played a real person before. "I've always played made-up characters, so I just really wanted to make sure that I had the feelings of the song and how Justin wanted me to feel. I really got to understand—it's a bit more of a serious song but I'm really excited for people to hear it, so they can see the story. It's really good."

Bieber praised Jacob Tremblay for his talent, adding that he became emotional when he saw Tremblay play himself, while he acts as a spectator "from the outside looking in". In a livestream on Bieber's YouTube channel after the song's release, both Bieber and Blanco called Tremblay one of the best child actors they have ever seen. "The first time I watched him go through the segment ... I legitimately lost it," Justin said of witnessing Tremblay on set. "I was tearing up, like completely."

On October 27, 2020, an acoustic video for "Lonely" was released. Directed by Schreier, the video sees Blanco playing on a Wurlitzer electronic piano, with Bieber singing beside him while sitting in front of a mic in a recording studio.

=== Synopsis ===
The video opens with Tremblay sitting alone in a dressing room, staring at himself in the mirror. He is dressed like Bieber in the early days of his career, with bowl-style side-swept hair, a purple hoodie, white denim jacket and pants, and a pair of purple sneakers. Blanco makes an appearance as he enters the room to notify Tremblay it is time to get on stage. Tremblay then proceeds to pick up a hockey stick and practice hockey briefly, before exiting the dressing room. As the video progresses, Tremblay walks around the backstage by himself, and ultimately ends up on stage facing an empty theater, mouthing the lyrics "I'm so lonely". As the camera zooms out, Bieber is revealed to be the only member of the audience, watching Tremblay's performance in his seat with a blank expression, reflecting on and judging his own past.

=== Credits and personnel ===
Credits adapted from YouTube.

- Park Pictures – production company
- Jake Schreier – director
- Jackie Kelman Bisbee – executive producer
- Cody Ryder – producer
- Jason McCormick – director of photography
- Dana Morris – Steadicam
- Scott Falconer – production designer
- Chris Buongiorno – visual effects
- Michael Rossiter – color grading

== Live performances ==
On October 17, 2020, Bieber and Blanco performed "Lonely" live, alongside Bieber's previous single, "Holy", featuring American rapper Chance the Rapper, the lead and previous single from Justice on Saturday Night Live. Both songs were performed live for the first time. Instead of performing in a traditional stage setup, Bieber started his performance in a backstage dressing room. He sang to himself in a mirror, before wandering through the dimly lit, empty hallways of Studio 8H. He eventually made his way onto the stage under a singular spotlight, with Blanco on the piano. At the end of the performance, he kept his head down for a bit, then walked over to give Blanco a hug. On November 15, 2020, Bieber and Blanco performed the song at the 46th ceremony of the People's Choice Awards. The performance began with Bieber sitting alone at a bus stop on an empty city street, with Blanco off to the side playing the keyboard. On November 22, 2020, Bieber and Blanco gave another live performance of the song at the American Music Awards of 2020. Bieber, dressed in a blue plaid shirt and orange beanie, performed the song on a stage surrounded by mirrors, while Blanco played the keyboard behind him.

== Critical reception ==
=== Year-end lists ===
Publication	List	Rank	Ref.
iHeartRadio	The 30 Songs That Made Us Feel Something In 2020	20	

== Personnel ==
- Justin Bieber – vocals, songwriting
- Benny Blanco – songwriting, production, engineering, keyboards, programming
- Finneas – songwriting, production, engineering, keyboards, programming
- Elijah Marrett-Hitch – mixing assistance
- Devin Nakao – engineering
- Josh Gudwin – engineering, mixing, vocal engineering, vocal production
- Chris O'Ryan – vocal engineering, vocal production
- Chris Gehringer – mastering
- Andrew Luftman – production coordination
- Sarah Shelton – production coordination
- Scooter Braun – production coordination

== Charts ==
=== Weekly charts ===
Chart (2020–2021)	Peak position
Australia (ARIA)	11
Austria (Ö3 Austria Top 40)	7
Belgium (Ultratop 50 Flanders)	6
Belgium (Ultratop 50 Wallonia)	37
Canada Hot 100 (Billboard)	1
Canada CHR/Top 40 (Billboard)	13
Canada Hot AC (Billboard)	26
Czech Republic Singles Digital (ČNS IFPI)	24
Denmark (Tracklisten)	4
Finland (Suomen virallinen lista)	6
France (SNEP)	35
Germany (GfK)	9
Global 200 (Billboard)	5
Greece (IFPI)	11
Hungary (Rádiós Top 40)	30
Hungary (Single Top 40)	1
Hungary (Stream Top 40)	5
Iceland (Tónlistinn)	10
Ireland (IRMA)	7
Italy (FIMI)	56
Japan Hot Overseas (Billboard)	3
Lithuania (AGATA)	6
Malaysia (RIM)	1
Mexico Ingles Airplay (Billboard)	21
Netherlands (Dutch Top 40)	2
Netherlands (Single Top 100)	2
New Zealand (Recorded Music NZ)	12
Norway (VG-lista)	1
Peru (UNIMPRO)	97
Poland Airplay (ZPAV)	43
Portugal (AFP)	5
Portugal Airplay (AFP)	1
Scottish Singles Sales (Official Charts)	16
Singapore (RIAS)	4
Slovakia Airplay (ČNS IFPI)	16
Slovakia Singles Digital (ČNS IFPI)	10
Spain (Promusicae)	38
Sweden (Sverigetopplistan)	9
Switzerland (Schweizer Hitparade)	5
UK Singles (Official Charts)	17
US Billboard Hot 100	12
US Adult Contemporary (Billboard)	14
US Adult Pop Airplay (Billboard)	9
US Dance Airplay (Billboard)	20
US Pop Airplay (Billboard)	2

=== Year-end charts ===
Chart (2020)	Position
Denmark (Tracklisten)	192
Hungary (Single Top 40)	70
Hungary (Stream Top 40)	68
Netherlands (Dutch Top 40)	52
Netherlands (Single Top 100)	85
Portugal (AFP)	149

Chart (2021)	Position
Belgium (Ultratop Flanders)	89
Canada (Canadian Hot 100)	58
Denmark (Tracklisten)	94
Global 200 (Billboard)	89
Portugal (AFP)	78
US Billboard Hot 100	65
US Adult Contemporary (Billboard)	35
US Adult Top 40 (Billboard)	30
US Mainstream Top 40 (Billboard)	22

== Certifications ==
Region	Certification	Certified units/sales
Australia (ARIA)	2× Platinum	140,000^{‡}
Belgium (BRMA)	Platinum	40,000^{‡}
Brazil (Pro-Música Brasil)	Diamond	160,000^{‡}
Canada (Music Canada)	2× Platinum	160,000^{‡}
Denmark (IFPI Danmark)	Platinum	90,000^{‡}
France (SNEP)	Diamond	333,333^{‡}
Germany (BVMI)	Gold	200,000^{‡}
Italy (FIMI)	Gold	35,000^{‡}
Mexico (AMPROFON)	4× Platinum	240,000^{‡}
New Zealand (RMNZ)	Platinum	30,000^{‡}
Norway (IFPI Norway)	2× Platinum	120,000^{‡}
Poland (ZPAV)	2× Platinum	100,000^{‡}
Portugal (AFP)	2× Platinum	20,000^{‡}
Spain (Promusicae)	Platinum	60,000^{‡}
United Kingdom (BPI)	Gold	400,000^{‡}
United States (RIAA)	2× Platinum	2,000,000^{‡}
Streaming
Sweden (GLF)	Platinum	8,000,000^{†}
^{‡} Sales+streaming figures based on certification alone.^{†} Streaming-only figures based on certification alone.

== Release history ==
Region	Date	Format(s)	Label(s)	Ref.
Various	October 16, 2020	Digital download; streaming	Def Jam; Interscope; Friends Keep Secrets	
United States	October 20, 2020	Contemporary hit radio	Def Jam; Interscope; Friends Keep Secrets	
Italy	October 30, 2020	Radio airplay	Universal	

== See also ==
- List of number-one songs of 2020 (Malaysia)
