= Better to Lie =

2018 single by Benny Blanco

Single by Benny Blanco, Jesse and Swae Lee

from the album Friends Keep Secrets
- Released: November 30, 2018
- Genre: Pop rock
- Length: 2:56
- Label: Friends Keep Secrets; Interscope
- Songwriter(s): Benjamin Levin; Jesse Rutherford; Khalif Brown; John Ryan; Nathan Perez; Ammar Malik; Magnus Høiberg; Jacob Kasher Hindlin
- Producer(s): Benny Blanco; Happy Perez; Cashmere Cat

Benny Blanco singles chronology
"I Found You" (2018)	"Better to Lie" (2018)	"Roses" (2018)

Jesse singles chronology
"Too High" (2018)	"Better to Lie" (2018)

Swae Lee singles chronology
"Arms Around You" (2018)	"Better to Lie" (2018)	"Christmas At Swae's" (2018)

"Better to Lie" is a song by American record producer Benny Blanco, American singer Jesse, and American rapper Swae Lee. It was released by Friends Keep Secrets and Interscope on November 30, 2018.

== Background ==
Benny Blanco first announced the song on November 27, 2018 via Twitter and Instagram. He stated that the song made him feel "like 15 again". Swae Lee and Jesse Rutherford also promoted the song through their social media accounts. Rutherford shared a clip of him playing a part of the song prior to release.

== Track listing ==
Digital download
No.	Title	Length
1.	"Better to Lie"	2:56

== Charts ==
Chart (2018)	Peak position
Ireland (IRMA)	88
New Zealand Hot Singles (RMNZ)	15
Sweden Heatseeker (Sverigetopplistan)	19

== Release history ==
Region	Date	Format	Label	Ref.
Various	November 30, 2018	Streaming; digital download	Friends Keep Secrets; Interscope	
