= I Can't Get Enough =

Single by Benny Blanco, Tainy, Selena Gomez and J Balvin
- Language: English; Spanish
- Released: February 28, 2019
- Studio: 555 Studio (Los Angeles, CA); Blackwood Studios (Studio City, CA); Studio 5020 (Miami, FL); Interscope Studios (Santa Monica, CA); Sweet Victory Studios (London, England)
- Genre: Electronic; urban; reggaeton
- Length: 2:38
- Label: Interscope
- Songwriter(s): Benjamin Levin; Marco Masis; Selena Gomez; José Osorio; Mike Sabath; Jhay Cortez; Cristina Chiluiza
- Producer(s): Benny Blanco; Tainy

Benny Blanco singles chronology
"I Found You / Nilda's Story" (2018)	"I Can't Get Enough" (2019)	"Graduation" (2019)

Tainy singles chronology
"Delicia" (2018)	"I Can't Get Enough" (2019)	"Callaíta" (2019)

Selena Gomez singles chronology
"Anxiety" (2019)	"I Can't Get Enough" (2019)	"Lose You to Love Me" (2019)

J Balvin singles chronology
"Bola Rebola" (2019)	"I Can't Get Enough" (2019)	"Con Altura" (2019)

Music video
- "I Can't Get Enough" on YouTube

"I Can't Get Enough" is an English-Spanish song by American record producer Benny Blanco, Puerto Rican record producer Tainy, American singer Selena Gomez, and Colombian singer J Balvin. It was released as a single on February 28, 2019. It was sent to radio on March 12, 2019. It was written by Tainy, Blanco, Gomez, Balvin, Cristina Chiluiza, Jhay Cortez and Mike Sabath. Its music video, directed by Jake Schreier, was released on March 12, 2019. The song was later included on Blanco's and Gomez's joint studio album I Said I Love You First (2025).

== Background ==
The collaboration was teased on Gomez's Instagram after she posted pictures of her wearing Benny Blanco's merch and what appeared to be the set of a music video. Gomez later revealed the title.

J Balvin told Entertainment Tonight that Gomez sings in English on the track, while he sings in Spanish. Balvin also spoke positively of working with Gomez, calling her "humble" and "amazing". In another interview, Balvin said Tainy invited him to participate on the song and that he thought it would be a "worldwide hit".

== Writing and composition ==
"I Can't Get Enough" was written by Mike Sabath, Cris Chiluiza, Jesús M. Nieves Cortes along with producers Benny Blanco and Tainy as well as performers Selena Gomez and J Balvin. It runs for 2 minutes and 38 seconds. Gomez opens the track with humming, while J Balvin follows, rapping in Spanish. Sonically, the song has been described as "a chill electronic track" as well as "a sultry electronic-meets-urban fusion" while lyrically is about "a couple's hot and steamy relationship".

It is composed in a key of B-flat minor and has a tempo of 95 beats per minute.

== Music video ==
The music video for "I Can't Get Enough" premiered on 12 March 2019 on Benny Blanco's YouTube channel. The video was directed by Jake Schreier. The video featured the four artists dancing on a gigantic bed. Selena Gomez, J Balvin and Tainy are wearing pyjamas. Benny Blanco is dressed in a large teddy bear suit. The video features Gomez walking and dancing, later with Balvin, Tainy and Blanco, then all four dancing together in the last part of the video.

The video gained almost 5 million online views in the first 24 hours of release. As of June 2021, the video has received over 224 million views on YouTube.

The music video also received a nomination at the 2019 MTV Video Music Awards for "Best Latin".

== Commercial performance ==
In the United States, "I Can't Get Enough" debuted at number 93 on Billboard Hot 100, and peaked at number 66 in its third week. It also entered and peaked at number 31 on the Mainstream Top 40.

Additionally, the song debuted at 46 in Australia, later peaking at number 43. It debuted at number 43 in the United Kingdom, falling off the chart the following week. It re-entered the chart and peaked at number 42 in the next week. The song also debuted and peaked at number 41 in Spain.

== Credit and personnel ==
Credits are adapted from Genius.

- Benny Blanco – writer, producer, programming, keyboard
- Marco Masis – writer, producer, programming, keyboard
- Selena Gomez – lead vocals, background vocals, writer
- J Balvin – writer, lead vocals, background vocals, featured artist
- Mike Sabath – writer
- Cris Chiluiza – writer
- Jhay Cortez – writer
- Serban Ghenea – mix engineer

== Charts ==
=== Weekly charts ===
Chart (2019)	Peak position
Argentina (Argentina Hot 100)	100
Australia (ARIA)	43
Austria (Ö3 Austria Top 40)	38
Belgium (Ultratop 50 Flanders)	39
Belgium (Ultratop 50 Wallonia)	48
Canada (Canadian Hot 100)	33
Colombia (National-Report)	29
Czech Republic (Singles Digitál Top 100)	17
France (SNEP)	91
Germany (GfK)	53
Greece (IFPI)	11
Hungary (Single Top 40)	20
Hungary (Stream Top 40)	7
Ireland (IRMA)	20
Italy (FIMI)	53
Lithuania (AGATA)	9
Netherlands (Single Top 100)	86
New Zealand Hot Singles (RMNZ)	4
Portugal (AFP)	35
Puerto Rico (Monitor Latino)	8
Romania (Airplay 100)	77
Singapore (RIAS)	18
Slovakia (Rádio Top 100)	33
Slovakia (Singles Digitál Top 100)	7
Spain (PROMUSICAE)	41
Sweden (Sverigetopplistan)	53
Switzerland (Schweizer Hitparade)	28
UK Singles (OCC)	42
US Billboard Hot 100	66
US Pop Airplay (Billboard)	31
US Latin Airplay (Billboard)	37
Venezuela (National-Report)	53

=== Year-end charts ===
Chart (2019)	Position
Portugal (AFP)	132

== Certifications ==
Region	Certification	Certified units/sales
Brazil (Pro-Música Brasil)	2× Platinum	80,000^{‡}
Canada (Music Canada)	2× Platinum	160,000^{‡}
France (SNEP)	Gold	100,000^{‡}
New Zealand (RMNZ)	Gold	15,000^{‡}
Poland (ZPAV)	Gold	25,000^{‡}
Spain (PROMUSICAE)	Gold	30,000^{‡}
United States (RIAA)	Gold	500,000^{‡}
^{‡} Sales+streaming figures based on certification alone.

== Release history ==
Region	Date	Format	Label	Ref.
Various	February 28, 2019	Digital Download	Interscope	
Italy	March 4, 2019	Contemporary hit radio	Universal	
United States	March 12, 2019	Contemporary hit radio	Interscope	
United States	March 12, 2019	Mainstream radio	Interscope	
United States	March 12, 2019	Rhythmic contemporary radio	Interscope	
