= Eastside (song) =

2018 debut single by Benny Blanco

Single by Benny Blanco, Halsey and Khalid

from the album Friends Keep Secrets
- Released: July 12, 2018
- Length: 2:53
- Label: Friends Keep Secrets; Interscope
- Songwriters: Benjamin Levin; Ashley Frangipane; Nathan Perez; Khalid Robinson; Edward Sheeran
- Producers: Andrew Watt; Benny Blanco; Cashmere Cat; Happy Perez

Benny Blanco singles chronology
"Eastside" (2018)	"I Found You" (2018)

Halsey singles chronology
"Alone" (2018)	"Eastside" (2018)	"Without Me" (2018)

Khalid singles chronology
"Ocean" (2018)	"Eastside" (2018)	"Better" (2018)

Music video
- "Eastside" on YouTube

"Eastside" is a song by American record producer Benny Blanco and American singers Halsey and Khalid. The song was released on July 12, 2018, as Blanco's debut single, and the lead single from his debut studio album Friends Keep Secrets.

The single debuted on the Billboard Hot 100 in the issue dated July 28, 2018, at number 56, and peaked at number nine on the chart, marking Blanco's first top 10 single credited as an artist and his 27th top 10 as a songwriter. Outside of the United States, "Eastside" topped the charts in New Zealand, the Republic of Ireland, Singapore, and the United Kingdom, and peaked within the top ten of the charts in several other countries, including Australia, Canada, Denmark, and Norway.

Additionally, "Eastside" spent 45 weeks on Billboard's Pop Songs radio airplay chart, tying the longevity record for the most weeks spent on the chart with Khalid and Normani's "Love Lies" and Dua Lipa's "New Rules"; this record has since been broken and is currently held by Rema and Selena Gomez's "Calm Down".

== Composition ==
Sheet music for "Eastside" shows the key of F♯ minor, with a tempo of 89 beats per minute and a chord progression of F♯m–E–A–D–E. The song is musically based around a "hazily" plucked guitar riff. Lyrically, "Eastside" discusses the development and complexities of a forbidden romantic relationship; it also discusses maturing, similar to a coming of age story.

== Release ==
Blanco premiered the song on July 12 on the Beats 1 station on Apple Music, in an interview with Zane Lowe. The song was then released for streaming and as a download, and the music video was released on the same day.

== Live performances ==
Blanco, Halsey, and Khalid performed the song at the American Music Awards of 2018, with a "bedroom setting". Halsey also performed "Eastside" solo on her 2018 tour. In February 2019, Halsey performed the entire song live on Saturday Night Live. During her performance of the song, she painted an upside-down portrait of a woman's head on the floor of the stage.

== Copyright infringement lawsuit ==
In May 2021 a lawsuit for copyright infringement was filed against Blanco and the other co-writers of "Eastside" by the band American XO alleging that the guitar riff that forms the basis of "Eastside" was copied from their 2015 song "Loveless." The Lawsuit contains an audio comparison, referred to as "Exhibit A" of the two songs being played simultaneously that allegedly shows the similarities between the main riff of "Eastside" and the guitar hook for "Loveless." The suit was eventually dropped. "While we are grateful that plaintiffs belatedly recognized they had no viable claim of copyright infringement," one of the defense attorneys said afterwards, "it is unfortunate that our clients ever had to deal with an infringement accusation that never should have been made."

== Charts ==
=== Weekly charts ===
Weekly chart performance
Chart (2018–2019)	Peak position
Australia (ARIA)	2
Austria (Ö3 Austria Top 40)	12
Belgium (Ultratop 50 Flanders)	28
Belgium (Ultratop 50 Wallonia)	30
Canada Hot 100 (Billboard)	6
Canada AC (Billboard)	34
Canada CHR/Top 40 (Billboard)	2
Canada Hot AC (Billboard)	5
Croatia (HRT)	26
Czech Republic Singles Digital (ČNS IFPI)	9
Denmark (Tracklisten)	2
Finland Airplay (Radiosoittolista)	15
France (SNEP)	97
Germany (GfK)	15
Greece International (IFPI)	13
Hungary (Single Top 40)	34
Hungary (Stream Top 40)	9
Ireland (IRMA)	1
Italy (FIMI)	59
Lebanon (Lebanese Top 20)	1
Malaysia (RIM)	4
Mexico Airplay (Billboard)	23
Netherlands (Dutch Top 40)	20
Netherlands (Single Top 100)	21
New Zealand (Recorded Music NZ)	1
Norway (VG-lista)	3
Portugal (AFP)	7
Romania (Airplay 100)	69
Scottish Singles Sales (Official Charts)	4
Singapore (RIAS)	1
Slovakia Airplay (ČNS IFPI)	23
Slovakia Singles Digital (ČNS IFPI)	8
Slovenia (SloTop50)	22
Spain (PROMUSICAE)	62
Sweden (Sverigetopplistan)	7
Switzerland (Schweizer Hitparade)	22
UK Singles (Official Charts)	1
US Billboard Hot 100	9
US Adult Contemporary (Billboard)	21
US Adult Pop Airplay (Billboard)	1
US Dance Airplay (Billboard)	4
US Pop Airplay (Billboard)	1
US Rhythmic Airplay (Billboard)	19
US Rolling Stone Top 100	70

=== Year-end charts ===
Annual chart rankings
Chart (2018)	Position
Australia (ARIA)	10
Austria (Ö3 Austria Top 40)	32
Belgium (Ultratop Flanders)	93
Canada (Canadian Hot 100)	60
Denmark (Tracklisten)	19
Estonia (IFPI)	31
Germany (Official German Charts)	57
Ireland (IRMA)	13
Netherlands (Dutch Top 40)	99
Netherlands (Single Top 100)	54
New Zealand (Recorded Music NZ)	16
Portugal (AFP)	42
Sweden (Sverigetopplistan)	56
Switzerland (Schweizer Hitparade)	69
UK Singles (Official Charts Company)	19
US Billboard Hot 100	77
US Mainstream Top 40 (Billboard)	47
Chart (2019)	Position
Australia (ARIA)	12
Canada (Canadian Hot 100)	17
Denmark (Tracklisten)	53
Ireland (IRMA)	37
Latvia (LAIPA)	38
New Zealand (Recorded Music NZ)	14
Portugal (AFP)	74
UK Singles (Official Charts Company)	42
US Billboard Hot 100	17
US Adult Top 40 (Billboard)	6
US Dance/Mix Show Airplay (Billboard)	15
US Mainstream Top 40 (Billboard)	3
US Rolling Stone Top 100	40
Chart (2020)	Position
Australia (ARIA)	77

=== Decade-end charts ===
Chart (2010–2019)	Position
Australia (ARIA)	58

== Certifications ==
Region	Certification	Certified units/sales
Australia (ARIA)	17× Platinum	1,190,000^{‡}
Belgium (BRMA)	Gold	20,000^{‡}
Brazil (Pro-Música Brasil)	Diamond	160,000^{‡}
Canada (Music Canada)	5× Platinum	400,000^{‡}
Denmark (IFPI Danmark)	3× Platinum	270,000^{‡}
France (SNEP)	Platinum	200,000^{‡}
Germany (BVMI)	Platinum	400,000^{‡}
Italy (FIMI)	Platinum	50,000^{‡}
Mexico (AMPROFON)	Gold	30,000^{‡}
New Zealand (RMNZ)	9× Platinum	270,000^{‡}
Norway (IFPI Norway)	3× Platinum	180,000^{‡}
Poland (ZPAV)	2× Platinum	100,000^{‡}
Portugal (AFP)	3× Platinum	30,000^{‡}
Spain (Promusicae)	Platinum	60,000^{‡}
United Kingdom (BPI)	5× Platinum	3,000,000^{‡}
United States (RIAA)	7× Platinum	7,000,000^{‡}
Streaming
Sweden (GLF)	Platinum	8,000,000^{†}
^{‡} Sales+streaming figures based on certification alone.^{†} Streaming-only figures based on certification alone.

== Release history ==
Region	Date	Format	Label	Ref.
Various	July 12, 2018	Digital download	Friends Keep Secrets; Interscope	
United States	July 24, 2018	Contemporary hit radio	Interscope	
United States	July 24, 2018	Rhythmic contemporary radio	Interscope	
Italy	July 27, 2018	Contemporary hit radio	Universal	

== See also ==
- List of best-selling singles in Australia
- List of number-one songs of 2018 (Singapore)
