= Benny Blanco =

American record producer (born 1988)

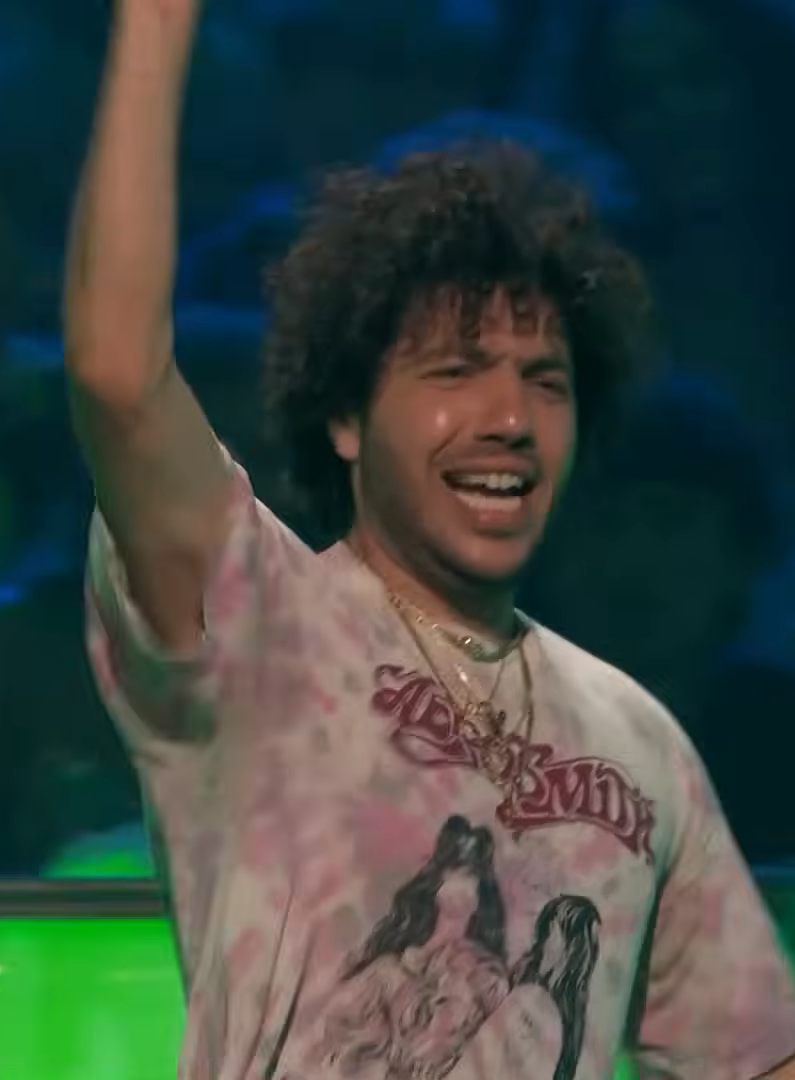
- Blanco in 2025

Background information
- Born: Benjamin Joseph Levin; March 8, 1988 (age 38); Reston, Virginia, U.S.
- Genre: Pop
- Occupations: Record producer; songwriter; music executive; author
- Works: Benny Blanco production discography
- Years active: 2007–present
- Label: Interscope
- Formerly of: Bangers & Cash; BenZel
- Spouse: Selena Gomez (m. 2025)
- Website: benny-blanco.com

Benjamin Joseph Levin (born March 8, 1988), known professionally as Benny Blanco (stylized in all lowercase), is an American record producer. He is the recipient of the 2013 Hal David Starlight Award from the Songwriters Hall of Fame. Blanco has also won five BMI Songwriter of the Year Awards, won the 2017 iHeartRadio Producer of the Year Award, and received eleven Grammy Award nominations.

He was mentored by fellow producer Dr. Luke, who signed him to his production company Kasz Money Productions. Blanco was thereafter credited on various productions with Luke from 2008 to the mid-2010s. Since then, Blanco has contributed to albums and singles that have sold a cumulative 500 million album-equivalent units; having produced or co-written for Ed Sheeran, BTS, Eminem, Justin Bieber, Halsey, Katy Perry, Maroon 5, Christina Aguilera, Kesha, Britney Spears, Rihanna, Sia, the Weeknd, Kanye West, Avicii, Adam Lambert, Charlie Puth, Keith Urban, OneRepublic, Wiz Khalifa, J Balvin, Ariana Grande, Kali Uchis, Juice Wrld, and SZA, among others.

In July 2018, Blanco released his debut single as a lead artist, "Eastside" (with Halsey and Khalid). The song peaked at number nine on the US Billboard Hot 100—marking his 27th top-ten song as a writer, a sum which includes seven number-one singles on the chart—and served as lead single for his debut studio album, Friends Keep Secrets (2018). Its deluxe issue, titled Friends Keep Secrets 2 (2021), spawned the top 40 single "Lonely" (with Justin Bieber). He and his wife Selena Gomez released the album I Said I Love You First in 2025.

Blanco has founded two labels as imprints of Interscope Records—Mad Love Records and Friends Keep Secrets—in 2014, through both of which he has signed acts including Tory Lanez, Jessie Ware, and Cashmere Cat, among others.

== Early life and career beginnings ==
Benjamin Joseph Levin was born on March 8, 1988, in Reston, Virginia, where he also grew up. He is Jewish. He began producing hip-hop instrumentals in his bedroom and recording his own vocals on top of them. His first serious exposure to music came in 1994, when he was six years old with Nas's "The World Is Yours" and All-4-One's "I Swear" on cassette tapes, which influenced his early productions. After early experiments with beat making and recording himself on his boombox, Blanco's rapping earned the attention of The Source magazine and executives at Columbia Records. His stage name came from the fictional character of the same name (played by John Leguizamo) in the 1993 film Carlito's Way, and was a reference to him being a white rapper.

He attended Camp Airy for many years of his childhood in Thurmont, Maryland, where he would routinely perform and host a radio show under the name "Ebba Ebba". Blanco eventually secured an apprenticeship with producer Disco D after multiple trips to New York City from his home in Virginia to meet with labels and producers.

== Career ==
=== 2007–2025 ===
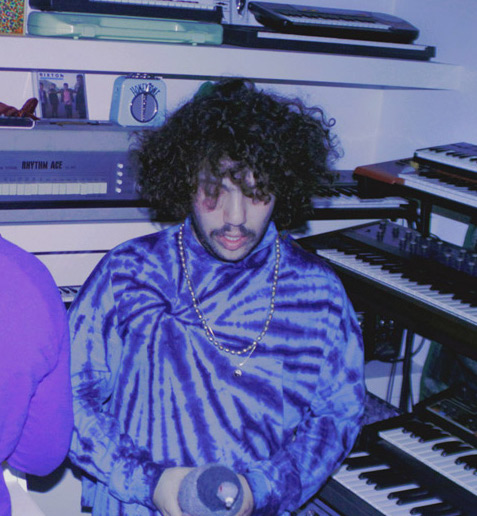
Blanco in 2015

Blanco was mentored for several years by Dr. Luke, who signed Blanco to his production company Kasz Money Productions. While under Dr. Luke's tutelage, Blanco co-produced and co-wrote many songs, including hits such as Katy Perry's "Teenage Dream", Kesha's "TiK ToK", and Taio Cruz's "Dynamite".

In 2008, he took part in writing and producing Britney Spears' "Circus" (with Dr. Luke, and Claude Kelly). The song reached number three on the Billboard Hot 100 and number one on American pop radio and is her second-best-selling digital song in the United States, having sold over 3.2 million downloads as of July 2016. On a global scale, "Circus" was one of the top 10 best-selling songs of 2009 with 5.5 million digital copies sold that year across the world, according to the IFPI.

In 2011, Blanco wrote and produced his first charting hits without Dr. Luke, among them Maroon 5's "Moves like Jagger" and Gym Class Heroes' "Stereo Hearts". The same year, Blanco went on to work on Maroon 5's Platinum-selling album Overexposed and its lead single "Payphone" featuring Wiz Khalifa.

On June 13, 2013, Blanco was presented with the Hal David Starlight Award at the 44th Annual Songwriters Hall of Fame ceremony, an honor awarded to young artists who have already made an impression on the music industry. In his acceptance speech, he joked, "They picked the wrong person, I'm in a room with people I should probably be serving food to."

In the years since, Blanco has amassed 29 total number-one songs and is recognized for his achievements with artists including BTS, Gracie Abrams, Ed Sheeran, Justin Bieber, the Weeknd, Selena Gomez, Ariana Grande, Britney Spears, Lana Del Rey, Miguel, Halsey, and Camila Cabello.

Blanco was named Producer of the Year at the 2017 iHeartRadio Music Awards.

In 2025, Blanco was nominated for Latin Billboard Award for Latin Pop Song of the Year, and won Crossover Artist of the Year.

On November 7, 2025, Blanco received a Grammy nomination for Best Dance Pop Recording for Bluest Flame with Selena Gomez.

=== Artist projects ===
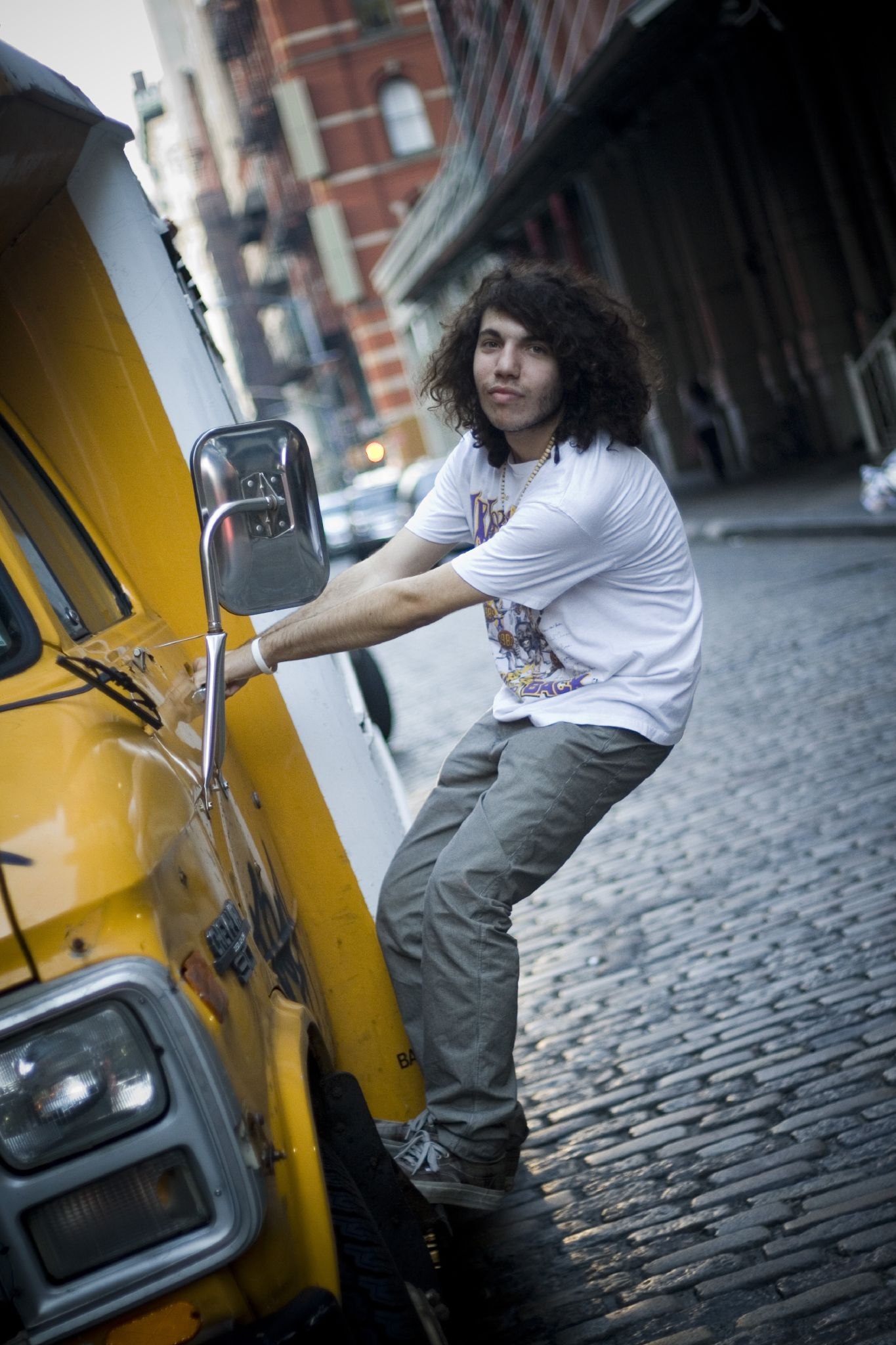
Blanco in 2008

In 2007, Blanco teamed up with Baltimore rapper Spank Rock to release Spank Rock and Benny Blanco Are... "Bangers & Cash", a collaborative EP for both artists based on 2 Live Crew samples that caught the attention of many in the industry and sparked connections to future collaborators Amanda Blank and Santigold. The EP received acclaim from the likes of Rolling Stone, Pitchfork and more.

In July 2018, Blanco released his debut song as a standalone solo artist, "Eastside" featuring Halsey and Khalid, on his own label Friends Keep Secrets with Interscope Records. The song peaked at number nine on the Billboard Hot 100, and was also a global success, topping the charts in New Zealand, the Republic of Ireland, Singapore, and the United Kingdom, and peaking within the top ten of the charts in several other countries, including Australia, Canada, Denmark, and Norway. Later in 2018, he released his second, third, and fourth singles: "I Found You" with Calvin Harris, "Better to Lie" with Jesse and Swae Lee, and "Roses" with Juice Wrld featuring Brendon Urie, respectively. His debut album Friends Keep Secrets was released on December 7, 2018.

In January 2019, Blanco released "I Found You / Nilda's Story" with Calvin Harris and Miguel in conjunction with the launch of The While They Wait Fund to benefit asylum seekers in the United States, an initiative by Brooklyn Defender Services, Refugee and Immigrant Center for Education and Legal Services and American Civil Liberties Union. The song debuted with a video directed by Jake Schreier highlighting the story of one Honduran woman, Nilda, and her two-year-old son Keyden.

In February 2019, Blanco released "I Can't Get Enough" with Tainy, Selena Gomez, and J Balvin. On August 30, 2019, Blanco released a song with Juice Wrld called "Graduation", their second collaboration after "Roses".

In October 2020, Blanco released his first artist collaboration with Justin Bieber titled "Lonely". The second and third singles ("Real Shit" with Juice Wrld and "Unlearn" with Gracie Abrams) followed in December 2020 and March 2021, respectively.

A deluxe version of his album Friends Keep Secrets 2 was released on March 26, 2021, and was certified RIAA platinum on the day of release.

On August 5, 2022, Blanco released his first artist collaboration with BTS members Jin, Jimin, V, and Jungkook as well as Snoop Dogg titled "Bad Decisions".

On December 16, 2023, a posthumous Juice Wrld song with Blanco and Eminem titled "Lace It" was released.

On October 17, 2024, Blanco released a collaboration with Myke Towers, the song "Degenere" reached #1 on the Latin Pop Chart, Latin Airplay Chart and Billboard's Latin Rhythm Chart.

In February 2025, Blanco and fiancée Selena Gomez announced a collaborative album, I Said I Love You First, which was released on March 21, 2025. "Scared of Loving You" was the first track to be released from the album. On August 25, 2025, their collaboration with The Marías “Ojos Tristes” reached #1 on the overall Latin Chart, Latin Pop Chart and Urban Latin Chart.

On November 14, 2025 Blanco released a collaboration with Netón Vega titled "Perro Fiel". The song serves as the lead single off Blanco's second studio album, titled Hermoso, set to be released on August 14, 2026.

=== Media ===
On March 9, 2020, Blanco and acclaimed chef Matty Matheson debuted a new collaborative cooking show, Matty and Benny Eat Out America, on Blanco's YouTube channel. The first episode featured a behind-the-scenes visit to fellow YouTuber Kenny Beats's show The Cave where Blanco teaches Matheson to rap. Additional episodes included Lil Dicky, Mason Ramsey, Diplo, Laird Hamilton and more.

On April 16, 2020, Blanco made his TV debut playing a fictionalized version of himself on the first and second seasons of the FXX series Dave with Lil Dicky.

On March 31, 2021, Blanco and chef Matty Matheson debuted a new cooking show on Blanco's YouTube channel, called Stupid F*cking Cooking Show.

On February 18, 2026, Blanco, Lil Dicky, and Kristin Batalucco launched Friends Keep Secrets, a multimedia podcast, featuring informal conversations with celebrity guests including Ed Sheeran and Lizzo. The series is filmed in the Los Angeles home of Lil Dicky and Batalucco using hidden cameras. On April 16, 2026, Blanco made an appearance as a fictionalized version of himself on an episode of Beef.

=== Books ===
Blanco's first book, Open Wide: A Cookbook for Friends, was co-authored with Jess Damuck and published on April 30, 2024. Blanco's second book, F*ck Failure, released on September 15, 2026.

== Record labels ==
In 2014, Blanco founded two imprint labels under Interscope, Mad Love Records and Friends Keep Secrets. The label includes the following artists, many of whom were initially signed with the former, which served as its predecessor.

- Tory Lanez (former)
- Cashmere Cat
- Trill Sammy
- 6 Dogs (former; deceased)
- Ryn Weaver
- Jessie Ware

== Personal life ==
In 2019, it was reported that Blanco was dating model Elsie Hewitt. Blanco has been in a relationship with Selena Gomez since June 2023. They formally announced their engagement on December 11, 2024, following a period of media speculation, and were married on September 27, 2025 at the Sea Crest Nursery in Santa Barbara, California.

== Discography ==
=== Studio albums ===
List of studio albums, with selected details and chart positions
Title	Details	Peak chart positions										Sales	Certifications
Title	Details	US	AUS	CAN	DEN	GER	IRE	NOR	NZ	SWE	UK	Sales	Certifications
Friends Keep Secrets	Released: December 7, 2018; Label: Friends Keep Secrets, Interscope; Format: Digital download, streaming	41	39	21	—	—	74	35	—	—	—		RIAA: Platinum; RIAS: Gold; ZPAV: Gold
I Said I Love You First (with Selena Gomez)	Released: March 21, 2025; Label: SMG Music LLC, Friends Keep Secrets, Interscope; Format: CD, digital download, LP, streaming	2	5	6	15	2	4	10	6	45	4	US: 78,000 (Note: United States first week (71,000) and second week (7,000) sales figures for I Said I Love You First.)	
Hermoso	Released: August 14, 2026; Label: Friends Keep Secrets, Interscope; Format: Digital download, streaming	—	—	—	—	—	—	—	—	—	—		
"—" denotes a recording that did not chart in that territory.

==== Reissues ====
List of reissues, with selected details and chart positions
Title	Details	Peak chart positions	Certifications
Title	Details	IRE	Certifications
Friends Keep Secrets 2	Released: March 26, 2021; Label: Friends Keep Secrets, Interscope; Format: Digital download, streaming	97	BPI: Silver

=== Extended plays ===
List of extended plays, with selected details, and certifications
Title	Details	Certifications
Bangers & Cash (with Spank Rock)	Released: October 9, 2007; Label: Downtown; Format: CD	RIAA: Platinum

=== Singles ===
==== As lead artist ====
List of singles as lead artist, with selected chart positions and certifications, showing year released and album name
Title	Year	Peak chart positions										Certifications	Album
Title	Year	US	AUS	CAN	DEN	GER	IRE	NOR	NZ	SWE	UK	Certifications	Album
"Eastside" (with Halsey and Khalid)	2018	9	2	6	2	15	1	3	1	7	1	RIAA: 7× Platinum; ARIA: 17× Platinum; BPI: 5× Platinum; BVMI: Platinum; GLF: Platinum; IFPI DEN: 2× Platinum; IFPI NOR: 3× Platinum; MC: 5× Platinum; RMNZ: 8× Platinum	Friends Keep Secrets
"I Found You" (with Calvin Harris)	2018	—	54	95	—	—	24	—	— (Note: "I Found You" did not enter the NZ Top 40 Singles Chart, but peaked at number three on the NZ Hot Singles Chart.)	86	29	BPI: Silver; RMNZ: Platinum	Friends Keep Secrets
"Better to Lie" (with Jesse and Swae Lee)	2018	—	—	—	—	—	88	—	— (Note: "Better to Lie" did not enter the NZ Top 40 Singles Chart, but peaked at number 15 on the NZ Hot Singles Chart.)	— (Note: "Better to Lie" did not enter the Swedish Singellista Chart, but peaked at number 19 on the Swedish Heatseeker Chart.)	—		Friends Keep Secrets
"Roses" (with Juice Wrld featuring Brendon Urie)	2018	85	—	58	—	—	81	38	— (Note: "Roses" did not enter the NZ Top 40 Singles Chart, but peaked at number 10 on the NZ Hot Singles Chart.)	— (Note: "Roses" did not enter the Swedish Singellista Chart, but peaked at number five on the Swedish Heatseeker Chart.)	—	RIAA: 2× Platinum; BPI: Silver; MC: Platinum; RMNZ: Gold	Friends Keep Secrets
"I Found You / Nilda's Story" (with Calvin Harris and Miguel)	2019	—	—	—	—	—	—	—	—	—	—		Non-album single
"I Can't Get Enough" (with Tainy, Selena Gomez and J Balvin)	2019	66	43	33	—	53	20	—	— (Note: "I Can't Get Enough" did not enter the NZ Top 40 Singles Chart, but peaked at number four on the NZ Hot Singles Chart.)	53	42	RIAA: Gold; MC: 2× Platinum; RMNZ: Gold	I Said I Love You First
"Graduation" (with Juice Wrld)	2019	— (Note: "Graduation" did not enter the Billboard Hot 100, but peaked at number eight on the Bubbling Under Hot 100 chart.)	—	90	—	—	56	—	— (Note: "Graduation" did not enter the NZ Top 40 Singles Chart, but peaked at number 12 on the NZ Hot Singles Chart.)	—	88	RIAA: Platinum; BPI: Silver; RMNZ: Gold	Friends Keep Secrets 2
"Lonely" (with Justin Bieber)	2020	12	11	1	4	9	7	3	12	15	17	RIAA: 2× Platinum; ARIA: 2× Platinum; BPI: Gold; BVMI: Gold; GLF: Platinum; IFPI DEN: Platinum; IFPI NOR: 2× Platinum; MC: 2× Platinum; RMNZ: Platinum	Justice and Friends Keep Secrets 2
"Real Shit" (with Juice Wrld)	2020	72	52	52	—	—	57	—	— (Note: "Real Shit" did not enter the NZ Top 40 Singles Chart, but peaked at number four on the NZ Hot Singles Chart.)	— (Note: "Real Shit" did not enter the Swedish Singellista Chart, but peaked at number one on the Swedish Heatseeker Chart.)	75		Friends Keep Secrets 2
"You" (with Marshmello and Vance Joy)	2021	—	55	62	—	—	77	—	— (Note: "You" did not enter the NZ Top 40 Singles Chart, but peaked at number two on the NZ Hot Singles Chart.)	38	—		Friends Keep Secrets 2
"Unlearn" (with Gracie Abrams)	2021	—	—	—	—	—	—	—	—	—	—		Friends Keep Secrets 2
"Bad Decisions" (with BTS and Snoop Dogg)	2022	10	31	31	—	89	63	—	— (Note: "Bad Decisions" did not enter the NZ Top 40 Singles Chart, but peaked at number three on the NZ Hot Singles Chart.)	— (Note: "Bad Decisions" did not enter the Swedish Singellista Chart, but peaked at number six on the Swedish Heatseeker Chart.)	53	RIAA: Gold; MC: Gold	Non-album single
"Lace It" (with Juice Wrld and Eminem)	2023	85	—	55	—	—	—	—	— (Note: "Lace It" did not enter the NZ Top 40 Singles Chart, but peaked at number three on the NZ Hot Singles Chart.)	—	95		The Party Never Ends
"Degenere" (with Myke Towers)	2024	— (Note: "Degenere" did not enter the Billboard Hot 100, but peaked at number 35 on the Billboard Hot Latin Songs chart.)	—	—	—	—	—	—	—	—	—		La Pantera Negra and Hermoso
"Call Me When You Break Up" (with Selena Gomez and Gracie Abrams)	2025	46	84	41	—	61	37	—	— (Note: "Call Me When You Break Up" did not enter the NZ Top 40 Singles Chart, but peaked at number six on the NZ Hot Singles Chart.)	— (Note: "Call Me When You Break Up" did not enter the Swedish Singellista Chart, but peaked at number two on the Swedish Heatseeker Chart.)	28	BPI: Silver; MC: Gold	I Said I Love You First
"Sunset Blvd" (with Selena Gomez)	2025	97	—	79	—	—	—	—	— (Note: "Sunset Blvd" did not enter the NZ Top 40 Singles Chart, but peaked at number 15 on the NZ Hot Singles Chart.)	—	100		I Said I Love You First
"Ojos Tristes" (with Selena Gomez and the Marías)	2025	56	—	83	—	—	—	—	— (Note: "Ojos Tristes" did not enter the NZ Top 40 Singles Chart, but peaked at number 12 on the NZ Hot Singles Chart.)	—	—		I Said I Love You First
"Joven y Salvaje" (with Bb Tricks)	2026	—	—	—	—	—	—	—	—	—	—		Hermoso
"Te Olvido (La La)" (with Selena Gomez and Becky G)	2026	—	—	—	—	—	—	—	—	—	—		Hermoso
"—" denotes a recording that did not chart in that territory.

==== Promotional singles ====
List of promotional singles, with selected chart positions, showing year released and album name
Title	Year	Peak chart positions			Album
Title	Year	US Bub.	CAN	NZ Hot	Album
"Scared of Loving You" (with Selena Gomez)	2025	12	97	14	I Said I Love You First
"Younger and Hotter Than Me" (with Selena Gomez)	2025	2	85	11	I Said I Love You First
"—" denotes a recording that did not chart in that territory.

=== Other charted songs ===
List of other charted songs, with selected chart positions, showing year released and album name
Title	Year	Peak chart positions						Album
Title	Year	US	CAN	IRE	NZ Hot	UK	WW	Album
"Don't Wanna Cry" (with Selena Gomez)	2025	— (Note: "Don't Wanna Cry" did not enter the Billboard Hot 100, but peaked at number 18 on the Bubbling Under Hot 100 chart.)	—	—	—	—	—	I Said I Love You First
"Cowboy" (with Selena Gomez)	2025	— (Note: "Cowboy" did not enter the Billboard Hot 100, but peaked at number 14 on the Bubbling Under Hot 100 chart.)	—	—	—	—	—	I Said I Love You First
"Bluest Flame" (with Selena Gomez)	2025	— (Note: "Bluest Flame" did not enter the Billboard Hot 100, but peaked at number seven on the Bubbling Under Hot 100 chart.)	92	17	13	55	—	I Said I Love You First
"How Does It Feel to Be Forgotten" (with Selena Gomez)	2025	71	63	81	10	86	98	I Said I Love You First
"Talk" (with Selena Gomez)	2025	—	—	—	21	—	—	I Said I Love You First... And You Said It Back
"—" denotes a recording that did not chart in that territory.

== Songwriting and production discography ==
Blanco has written and produced songs for artists including Ed Sheeran ("Don't" and "Castle on the Hill"), Justin Bieber ("Love Yourself"), Major Lazer ("Cold Water"), Maroon 5 ("Moves like Jagger", "Payphone", "Maps", "Animals", "Don't Wanna Know"), the Weeknd ("True Colors"), Katy Perry ("Teenage Dream", "California Gurls"), Rihanna ("Diamonds"), Kesha ("TiK ToK", "We R Who We R"), Taio Cruz ("Dynamite"), Wiz Khalifa ("Work Hard, Play Hard"), Gym Class Heroes ("Stereo Hearts"), Kanye West ("I Thought About Killing You", "Ghost Town") Lil Dicky ("Freaky Friday"), Tory Lanez ("Luv").

== Awards and nominations ==
Name of the award ceremony, year presented, nominee(s) of the award, category, and the result of the nomination
Award ceremony	Year	Nominee(s)/work(s)	Category	Result	Ref.
BMI Awards	2011	Benny Blanco	Pop Songwriter of the Year	Won	
BMI Awards	2012	Benny Blanco	Pop Songwriter of the Year	Won	
BMI Awards	2012	"Moves like Jagger" (Maroon 5)	Song of the Year	Won	
BMI Awards	2012	Benny Blanco	R&B/ Hip Hop Songwriter of the Year	Won	
BMI Awards	2012	Benny Blanco	Pop Songwriter of the Year	Won	
BMI Awards	2013	Benny Blanco	Urban Songwriter of the Year	Won	
BMI Awards	2014	Benny Blanco	Pop Songwriter of the Year	Won	
BMI Awards	2024	Benny Blanco	Presidents Award	Won	
Clio Awards	2019	"I Found You / Nilda's Story" (Benny Blanco, Calvin Harris, and Miguel)	Music Videos	Gold	
Clio Awards	2019	"I Found You / Nilda's Story" (Benny Blanco, Calvin Harris, and Miguel)	Direction	Gold	
Golden Globe Awards	2017	"Faith" (Stevie Wonder featuring Ariana Grande)	Best Original Song	Nominated	
Grammy Awards	2011	Teenage Dream	Album of the Year	Nominated	
Grammy Awards	2013	"Heart Attack"	Best R&B Song	Nominated	
Grammy Awards	2015	x	Album of the Year	Nominated	
Grammy Awards	2017	Purpose	Album of the Year	Nominated	
Grammy Awards	2017	"Love Yourself"	Song of the Year	Nominated	
Grammy Awards	2017	"Luv"	Best R&B Song	Nominated	
Grammy Awards	2017	Benny Blanco	Producer of the Year, Non-Classical	Nominated	
Grammy Awards	2018	"Issues"	Song of the Year	Nominated	
Grammy Awards	2022	"Lonely"	Best Pop Duo/Group Performance	Nominated	
Grammy Awards	2022	Justice (Triple Chucks Deluxe)	Album of the Year	Nominated	
Grammy Awards	2023	Special	Album of the Year	Nominated	
Grammy Awards	2026	"Bluest Flame"	Best Dance Pop Recording	Nominated	
iHeartRadio Music Awards	2017	"Love Yourself" (Justin Bieber)	Best Lyrics	Won	
iHeartRadio Music Awards	2017	Benny Blanco	Producer of the Year	Won	
iHeartRadio Music Awards	2018	Benny Blanco	Producer of the Year	Nominated	
iHeartRadio Music Awards	2026	"Degenere"	Latin Pop / Urban Song of the Year	Nominated	
iHeartRadio Titanium Award	2019	"Eastside" (with Khalid & Halsey)	1 Billion Total Audience Spins on iHeartRadio Stations	Won	
Ivor Novello Awards	2018	"Castle on the Hill" (Ed Sheeran)	PRS for Most Performed Work	Nominated	
Songwriters Hall of Fame	2013	Benny Blanco	Hal David Starlight Award	Won	
Spotify Secret Genius Awards	2018	Benny Blanco	Secret Genius: Pop	Won	
Billboard	2025	Benny Blanco	Latin Pop Song of the Year	Nominated	
Billboard	2025	Benny Blanco	Crossover Artist of the Year	Won	

== Filmography ==
Year	Title	Role	Ref.
2020	Dave	Actor and Producer	
2021	Juice Wrld: Into the Abyss	Himself	
2023	The Eric Andre Show	Himself	
2026	Beef (TV series)	Himself	
