= Roses (Benny Blanco and Juice Wrld song) =

Single by Benny Blanco and Juice Wrld featuring Brendon Urie

from the album Friends Keep Secrets
- Released: December 5, 2018
- Genre: pop-rap
- Length: 3:43
- Label: Friends Keep Secrets; Interscope
- Songwriters: Benjamin Levin; Jarad Higgins; Brendon Urie; Magnus Høiberg; Nathan Perez
- Producers: Benny Blanco; Cashmere Cat; Happy Perez

Benny Blanco singles chronology
"Better to Lie" (2018)	"Roses" (2018)	"I Found You/Nilda's Story" (2019)

Juice Wrld singles chronology
"Armed and Dangerous" (2018)	"Roses" (2018)	"Robbery" (2019)

Brendon Urie singles chronology
"Love in the Middle of a Firefight" (2014)	"Roses" (2018)	"Me!" (2019)

"Roses" is a song by American record producer Benny Blanco and American rapper Juice Wrld featuring American singer Brendon Urie of Panic! at the Disco. It debuted on Zane Lowe's show World Record on Beats 1 the same day as the single's release, December 5, 2018. Rock Sound likened its announcement to an "ambitious crossover event".

== Promotion ==
Blanco initially posted a text exchange between himself and Juice Wrld before sharing two snippets of the song on Instagram. The following day he announced on Twitter that it would be released on December 5.

== Track listing ==
Digital download
No.	Title	Length
1.	"Roses" (with Juice Wrld featuring Brendon Urie)	3:43

== Charts ==
Chart (2018–2019)	Peak position
Belgium (Ultratip Bubbling Under Flanders)	27
Canada Hot 100 (Billboard)	58
Ireland (IRMA)	81
Lithuania (AGATA)	99
New Zealand Hot Singles (RMNZ)	10
Norway (VG-lista)	38
Slovakia Singles Digital (ČNS IFPI)	100
Sweden Heatseeker (Sverigetopplistan)	5
US Billboard Hot 100	85

== Certifications ==
Region	Certification	Certified units/sales
Brazil (Pro-Música Brasil)	Gold	20,000^{‡}
Canada (Music Canada)	Platinum	80,000^{‡}
Denmark (IFPI Danmark)	Gold	45,000^{‡}
New Zealand (RMNZ)	Platinum	30,000^{‡}
Portugal (AFP)	Gold	5,000^{‡}
United Kingdom (BPI)	Silver	200,000^{‡}
United States (RIAA)	2× Platinum	2,000,000^{‡}
^{‡} Sales+streaming figures based on certification alone.

== Release history ==
Region	Date	Format	Label	Ref.
Worldwide	December 5, 2018	Digital download	Friends Keep Secrets; Interscope	
