= 6 Dogs =

American rapper (1999–2021)

- 6 Dogs in 2020

Background information
- Born: Ronald Chase Amick; May 5, 1999; Dahlonega, Georgia, U.S.
- Died: January 26, 2021 (aged 21) Atlanta, Georgia, U.S.
- Genres: Alternative hip-hop; cloud rap; emo rap
- Occupations: Rapper; songwriter
- Years active: 2016–2021
- Labels: Mad Love; Interscope Records

Ronald Chase Amick (May 5, 1999 – January 26, 2021), better known by his stage name 6 Dogs, was an American rapper. He initially rose to fame when he released a music video for his song "Flossing.” During this time, he also released his song "Faygo Dreams,” which was certified gold by the Recording Industry Association of America (RIAA).

== Biography ==
=== Early life ===
Ronald Amick was born on May 5, 1999. He preferred to go by his middle name, Chase. He had part Native American ancestry. He grew up homeschooled by his mother, later attending Alpharetta High School, where he started his music career as a 17 year-old junior.

=== Career ===
Amick began posting songs to SoundCloud in 2016. In 2017, he released his eponymous debut album 6 Dogs. Shortly after, he signed a record deal with Interscope records in 2018, leading him to pursue collaborations with rap media titans such as No Jumper, Cole Bennett, Benny Blanco, and Danny Wolf.

In 2018, Amick co-directed a music video for his single "Buttcheeks,” with executive producer and director Cole Bennett. Later that year, 6 Dogs and Danny Wolf released their collaborative EP 6 Wolves, which included rapper Yung Bans as the sole feature. Also in 2018, 6 Dogs released his single "Off the Gas" featuring Lil Skies. He left Interscope in 2019 to independently release his second studio album, Hi-Hats & Heartaches.

=== Mental health ===
During his career, Amick was open about his struggles with mental health. He was known to suffer from bipolar disorder and psychotic episodes. He shared with fans how he became addicted to Oxycontin after a medical procedure, but later turned to music to treat his condition.

=== Death ===
On January 26, 2021, Amick fell from a building in Atlanta and died. Due to his history of mental health issues, many people speculated that his death was a suicide; however, the manner of his fall could not be determined. Amick reportedly often went to the building's rooftop to stargaze.

=== Legacy ===
His third and final studio album, Ronald., was released posthumously on March 12, 2021. Exactly three years after his death, he made an appearance on Lyrical Lemonade’s debut album All Is Yellow (2024) alongside fellow rapper Snot.

6 Dogs has generated more than 500 million streams on streaming services.

== Discography ==
=== Studio albums ===
Title	Details
6 Dogs	Released: July 3, 2017; Label: 6 Dogs Records; Format: Digital download, streaming
Hi-Hats & Heartaches	Released: October 24, 2019; Label: Mad Love/Interscope Records, Chaos Club; Format: Digital download, streaming
Ronald.	Released: March 12, 2021; Label: Don't Be Greedy; Format: Digital download, streaming

=== Extended plays ===
Title	Details
6 Wolves (with Danny Wolf)	Released: May 4, 2018; Label: Mad Love/Interscope Records, Chaos Club; Format: Digital download, streaming

=== Singles ===
==== As lead artist ====
List of singles as lead artist showing year released and album name
Title	Year	Album
"Mazi Love"	2017	6 Dogs
"Spaceship"	2017	6 Dogs
"Buttcheeks"	2018	Non-album singles
"OK"	2018	Non-album singles
"Off The Gas" (featuring Lil Skies)	2018	Non-album singles
"Guccy Armor"	2019	Non-album singles
"Spooky"	2019	Non-album singles
"Gucci Panda"	2019	Non-album singles
"Pokemon x Digimon"	2019	Non-album singles
"Saturn"	2019	Non-album singles
"Max Keeble"	2019	Non-album singles
"Drifting"	2019	Non-album singles
"Waffle House Song"	2019	Non-album singles
"Wallabeez"	2020	Non-album singles
"Energy"	2020	Non-album singles
"Burberry Weather"	2020	Non-album singles
"Takashi Murakami"	2020	Non-album singles
"Flex 4 No Reason" (featuring Yung Pinch)	2020	Non-album singles
"Starfire (Teen Titans)"	2021	Ronald.
"Beach House" (featuring RIZ LA VIE)	2021	Ronald.
"Dawg Shit"	2021	Non-album singles
"Turtles"	2022	Non-album singles
