= Dámelo To' =

2021 song by Selena Gomez

Song by Selena Gomez featuring Myke Towers

from the EP Revelación
- Released: March 12, 2021
- Studio: NEON16 Studio (Miami, FL); Gomez's house
- Length: 3:04
- Label: SMG Music LLC; Interscope
- Songwriters: Selena Gomez; Abner Cordero Boria; Alberto Carlos Melendez; Alejandro Borrero; Elena Rose; Christopher Ramos Carballo; Ivanni Rodríguez; Julia Michaels; Marco Masís; Michael Torres Monge
- Producers: Albert Hype; Jota Rosa; Neon16; Tainy; Schoudel

Lyric video
- "Dámelo To'" on YouTube

"Dámelo To'" is a song by American singer Selena Gomez from her first extended play Revelación (2021), included as the fourth track.

== Charts ==
| Chart (2021) | Peak position |
|---|---|
| Global Excl. US (Billboard) | 176 |
| New Zealand Hot Singles (RMNZ) | 29 |
| Spain (PROMUSICAE) | 90 |
| US Hot Latin Songs (Billboard) | 20 |
