= Baila Conmigo (Selena Gomez and Rauw Alejandro song) =

2021 single by Selena Gomez and Rauw Alejandro

Single by Selena Gomez and Rauw Alejandro

from the EP Revelación
- Language: Spanish
- English title: "Dance with Me"
- Released: January 29, 2021
- Studio: NEON16 Studio (Miami, FL); Gomez's house
- Genre: Reggaeton
- Length: 3:06
- Label: SMG Music LLC; Interscope
- Songwriters: Abner Cordero Boria; Christopher Carballo Ramos; Alberto Carlos Melendez; Marco Masís; Elena Rose; Édgar Barrera; Selena Gomez; Alejandro Borrero; Ivanni Rodríguez; Raúl Alejandro; Jorge A. Diaz
- Producers: Tainy; Albert Hype; Jota Rosa; Neon16

Selena Gomez singles chronology
"Ice Cream" (2020)	"Baila Conmigo" (2021)	"Selfish Love" (2021)

Rauw Alejandro singles chronology
"Fantasía Sexual" (2021)	"Baila Conmigo" (2021)	"Dile a Él" (2021)

Music video
- "Baila Conmigo" on YouTube

"Baila Conmigo" (transl. "Dance with Me") is a song by American singer Selena Gomez and Puerto Rican singer Rauw Alejandro for Gomez's third extended play Revelación (2021). It was written by Jorge A. Diaz, Édgar Barrera, Alejandro Borrero, Gomez, Abner Cordero Boria, Tainy, Ivanni Rodríguez, Alberto Carlos Melendez, Elena Rose, Alejandro, and Christopher Carballo Ramos, while the production was handled by NEON16, Jota Rosa, Albert Hype, and Tainy. The song was released for digital download and streaming by Interscope Records on January 29, 2021, as the lead single from the EP. A Spanish language slow-wind reggaeton song with bouncy midtempo drum rhythms, it is about dance and desire, despite there being a language barrier between the singers. The track received widely positive reviews from music critics, who complimented its danceable and catchy rhythm and the singers' vocals.

"Baila Conmigo" won the award for Music-Ship of the Year at the 2021 MTV Millennial Awards and was nominated for Collaboration of the Year – Pop at the 2022 Lo Nuestro Awards. The song was commercially successful, reaching number one in seven countries, including Argentina and Venezuela, as well as the top five in several other countries such as Bolivia and Costa Rica, and on Billboard's Hot Latin Songs in the United States. It also reached the summit of the Latin Airplay, Latin Pop Airplay, and Latin Rhythm Airplay charts, and became Alejandro's first entry on the Billboard Hot 100. The song has received several certifications, including double platinum in Spain. An accompanying music video, released simultaneously with the song, was directed by Fernando Nogari.

== Background and release ==
In a February 2020 interview with Dazed, Selena Gomez revealed that she had plans to release Spanish-language music. In December 2020, she stated that she has "a whole little vessel of good things coming", and Billboard stated that this "could include a Spanish-language project". Various murals were spotted in Mexico, stating the song titles "De Una Vez" and "Baila Conmigo", generating speculation amidst fans and mainstream media that Gomez would be releasing Latin music soon.

On January 14, 2021, Gomez released "De Una Vez" as the first and only promotional single from her first Spanish-language EP, Revelación (2021). The words "baila conmigo" were seen at the end of the music video. On January 26, Gomez shared the artwork for "Baila Conmigo" and announced that it was a collaboration with Rauw Alejandro and would be released on January 29. Gomez said in a press release that, with the song, she "wants to get everyone dancing." During an interview with E! Online, Alejandro stated:

The fact an artist of Selena's caliber considered me to collaborate on her project is a blessing. "Baila Conmigo" is super catchy and sexy. I hope fans love this collaboration as much as I do.

During an interview with Billboard, Gomez told the magazine: "I knew I wanted a male voice on 'Baila Conmigo' and I love Rauw's voice; I think he brings the right amount of sexiness to the song." On January 29, 2021, "Baila Conmigo" was released for digital download and streaming by Interscope Records as the lead single from the EP, marking the first collaboration between Gomez and Alejandro. It was included as the third track on Revelación, released March 12, 2021.

== Music and lyrics ==
It was a really interesting song for me to work on with Selena, since it fuses an authentic reggaeton sound with elements like the plucked electric guitar that lean more pop.

— Tainy on producing "Baila Conmigo".

Musically, "Baila Conmigo" is a slow-wind reggaeton song, with bouncy midtempo drum rhythms. It starts with a funky fingerpicked bass guitar riff, which has been compared with Charlie Puth records. The song was written by Jorge A. Diaz, Édgar Barrera, Alejandro Borrero, Gomez, Abner Cordero Boria, Tainy, Ivanni Rodríguez, Alberto Carlos Melendez, Elena Rose, Alejandro, and Christopher Carballo Ramos. Its production was handled by NEON16, Jota Rosa, Albert Hype, and Tainy, and the track runs for a total of 3 minutes and 6 seconds. According to the song's sheet music on Musicnotes.com, the song is composed in the key of D minor with a groove of 120 beats per minute. The singers' vocals span from the low note of D_{3} to the high note of A_{4}.

In "Baila Conmigo", which translates to "Dance with Me" in English, Gomez and Alejandro exchange sultry lyrics about dance and desire, despite there being a language barrier between them. The lyrics include, "Bebé, no sé si hablas mucho español / Si entiendes cuando digo 'mi amor' / Comernos sin entendernos, es mejor / Solo tenemos que gustarnos" ("Baby, I don't know if you speak a lot of Spanish / If you understand when I say 'my love' / Devouring each other without understanding each other is better / We only have to like each other").

== Critical reception ==
Upon release, "Baila Conmigo" was met with widely positive reviews from music critics. Billboard's Griselda Flores described the song as "seductive and contagious". Carolyn Twersky of Seventeen wrote that the track will "definitely have you up and dancing", while Josh Mendes from Monitor Latino desrcribed it as "catchy" due to its "musical structure". Gabriella Ferlita from Gigwise called Gomez's vocals "soft" and wavering" and Alejandro's tone "silky". Writing for We Are Mitú, Lucas Villa described the chemistry between Alejandro and Gomez in the track as "tangible", and called them a "dream team that we didn’t know we needed." In his review for Rolling Stone, he stated that "Gomez playfully channels the criticism that she's not fluent in Spanish into a red-hot moment on the EP" in "Baila Conmigo". Also from Rolling Stone, Ernesto Lechner ranked the track as the Alejandro's 50th-best song and named it "a cure for post-pandemic isolation".

== Accolades ==
Amazon Music ranked "Baila Conmigo" as the eighth-best Latin song of 2021. The song has received a number of awards and nominations. It won the award for Music-Ship of the Year at the 2021 MTV Millennial Awards and was nominated for Collaboration of the Year – Pop at the 2022 Lo Nuestro Awards.

Awards and nominations for "Baila Conmigo"
Organization	Year	Category	Result	Ref.
ASCAP Latin Awards	2022	Winning Song	Won	
Berlin Commercial Awards	2021	Best Music Video	Nominated	
Berlin Commercial Awards	2021	Craft: Idea	Nominated	
Berlin Commercial Awards	2021	Craft: Direction	Nominated	
Berlin Commercial Awards	2021	Craft: Cinematography	Nominated	
BMI Latin Awards	2023	Winning Songs (Note: Alejandro, Barrera, Cordero, Díaz, Hype, Rodriguez, Rose and Tainy has received as songwriter.)	Won	
Buenos Aires Music Video Festival (Note: The Buenos Aires Music Video Festival was established in 2019 to honour excellence in music video craft around the world based on a peer-voted selection process.)	2021	Video Pop	Nominated	
Ciclope Latino Festival (Note: The Ciclope Festival was established in 2010 to honour craft skills in advertising around the world based on a peer-voted selection process. The Ciclope Latino Festival was launched in 2016.)	2021	Music Video	Nominated	
E40 Music Awards	2021	Music Video of the Year	Won	
Premio Lo Nuestro	2022	Collaboration of the Year – Pop	Nominated	
MTV MIAW Awards	2021	Music-Ship of the Year	Won	
M-V-F Awards	2021	Best International Music Video	Won	
M-V-F Awards	2021	Best Direction in an International Music Video	Nominated	
Kids' Choice Awards Mexico	2021	Global Hit	Nominated	
Premios Juventud	2021	Colaboración OMG	Nominated	
Premios Juventud	2021	El Traffic Jam	Nominated	
Prêmios Likes Brasil	2021	Latin Hit of the Summer	Nominated	
Prêmios Tudo Information	2021	International Hit	Nominated	
UK Music Video Awards	2021	Best Pop Video – International	Nominated	

== Commercial performance ==
"Baila Conmigo" debuted and peaked at number four on the US Billboard Hot Latin Songs chart on February 13, 2021, with a first-week tally of 3000 downloads sold, 6.1 million streams, and 4.7 million radio impressions. Thus, it became both Gomez and Alejandro's third top 10 hit on the chart. The song also reached number one on the US Latin Digital Song Sales, Latin Airplay, Latin Rhythm Airplay, and Latin Pop Airplay charts. On the US Billboard Hot 100, "Baila Conmigo" debuted and peaked at number 74, giving Alejandro his first entry. It also became the highest-charting track from Revelación, surpassing "De Una Vez" which peaked at 92. In Canada, "Baila Conmigo" debuted and peaked at number 68 on Billboard's Canadian Hot 100 on the chart issue dated February 13, 2021, earning Alejandro his first entry.

Besides North America, the track hit the charts in several European countries, including France, Germany, and Switzerland. In the Netherlands, the song peaked at number one on the Single Tip chart on February 6, 2021. In Spain's official weekly chart, the song debuted at number 10 on February 7, 2021, becoming Gomez's fourth and Alejandro's seventh top-10 hit on the chart. It subsequently peaked at number seven on the chart on February 21, 2021. It was later certified double platinum by the Productores de Música de España (PROMUSICAE), for track-equivalent sales of over 80,000 units in the country. In Latin America, the song experienced further commercial success. It peaked at number one in Argentina, Ecuador, Panama, Paraguay, Puerto Rico, and Venezuela, and reached the top 10 in Bolivia, Costa Rica, El Salvador, Latin America, Mexico, Peru, and Uruguay. In Guatemala, Honduras, and Nicaragua, it reached the top 20.

== Promotion ==
=== Music video ===
A music video for "Baila Conmigo" premiered alongside the track's release on January 29, 2021, and was directed by Brazilian filmmaker Fernando Nogari. In the video, a woman sits alone watching Alejandro and Gomez dance and perform to the song. This inspires the woman out to the beach where she dances to the song. Gomez only appears in the video a "handful of times". The video was filmed between Los Angeles, Miami and a remote fishing village in Icapuí, Brazil. On the video and its significance with the COVID-19 pandemic, Gomez said: "The video portrays the sense of isolation we all are experiencing right now and how music truly does connect us all no matter where we are in the world."

=== Live performances ===
Gomez and Alejandro performed "Baila Conmigo" as pre-taped for the 33rd Annual Lo Nuestro Awards on February 18, 2021.

== Track listing ==
Digital download / streaming
No.	Title	Length
1.	"Baila Conmigo"	3:06

== Credits and personnel ==
Credits adapted from Tidal.

- Selena Gomez – associated performer, composer, lyricist, background vocalist, vocals
- Rauw Alejandro – associated performer, composer, lyricist
- Tainy – associated performer, producer, composer, lyricist, programming
- Abner Cordero Boria – composer, lyricist
- Christopher Carballo Ramos – composer, lyricist
- Alberto Carlos Melendez – composer, lyricist
- Elena Rose – associated performer, composer, lyricist, background vocalist
- Édgar Barrera – composer, lyricist
- Alejandro Borrero – composer, lyricist
- Ivanni Rodríguez – composer, lyricist, A&R
- Jorge A. Diaz – composer, lyricist
- Albert Hype – associated performer, producer, programming
- Jota Rosa – associated performer, producer, programming
- Neon16 – producer
- John Janick – A&R
- Sam Riback – A&R
- Vanessa Angiuli – A&R
- Lex Borrero – A&R
- Bart Schoudel – associated performer, engineer, vocal producer
- John Hanes – engineer
- Angelo Carretta – engineer
- Chris Gehringer – mastering engineer
- Serban Ghenea – mixer

== Charts ==
=== Weekly charts ===
Weekly chart performance for "Baila Conmigo"
Chart (2021)	Peak position
Argentina Hot 100 (Billboard)	8
Argentina (Monitor Latino)	1
Austria (Ö3 Austria Top 40)	55
Belgium (Ultratip Bubbling Under Flanders)	47
Bolivia (Monitor Latino)	2
Canada Hot 100 (Billboard)	68
Chile Urbano (Monitor Latino)	13
Colombia (National-Report)	39
Costa Rica (Monitor Latino)	5
Croatia (HRT)	80
Ecuador (Monitor Latino)	1
El Salvador (Monitor Latino)	8
France (SNEP)	187
Germany (GfK)	86
Global 200 (Billboard)	22
Global Excl. US (Billboard)	15
Greece (IFPI)	36
Guatemala (Monitor Latino)	14
Honduras (Monitor Latino)	13
Ireland (IRMA)	62
Latin America (Monitor Latino)	10
Lithuania (AGATA)	32
Mexico (Mexico Español Airplay)	19
Mexico Streaming (AMPROFON)	9
New Zealand Hot Singles (RMNZ)	4
Netherlands (Single Tip)	1
Nicaragua (Monitor Latino)	16
Panama (Monitor Latino)	1
Paraguay (Monitor Latino)	3
Peru Streaming (UNIMPRO)	7
Peru Urbano (Monitor Latino)	11
Puerto Rico (Monitor Latino)	1
Portugal (AFP)	52
Romania (Airplay 100)	25
Slovakia (Singles Digitál Top 100)	67
Spain (Promusicae)	7
Sweden Heatseeker (Sverigetopplistan)	12
Switzerland (Schweizer Hitparade)	28
Uruguay (Monitor Latino)	15
US Billboard Hot 100	74
US Hot Latin Songs (Billboard)	4
US Latin Airplay (Billboard)	1
US Latin Pop Airplay (Billboard)	1
US Latin Rhythm Airplay (Billboard)	1
Venezuela (Monitor Latino)	1
Venezuela (Record Report)	34

=== Monthly charts ===
Monthly chart position for "Baila Conmigo"
Chart (2022)	Peak position
Paraguay (SGP)	1
Uruguay (CUDISCO)	10

=== Year-end charts ===
Year-end chart performance for "Baila Conmigo"
Chart (2021)	Position
Argentina (Monitor Latino)	22
Bolivia (Monitor Latino)	29
Chile (Monitor Latino)	50
Costa Rica (Monitor Latino)	36
Ecuador (Monitor Latino)	23
El Salvador (Monitor Latino)	37
Global 200 (Billboard)	178
Guatemala (Monitor Latino)	48
Honduras (Monitor Latino)	85
Latin America (Monitor Latino)	46
Mexico Pop (Monitor Latino)	96
Nicaragua Urbano (Monitor Latino)	79
Panama (Monitor Latino)	60
Paraguay (Monitor Latino)	7
Peru (Monitor Latino)	70
Puerto Rico (Monitor Latino)	64
Spain (PROMUSICAE)	44
Uruguay (Monitor Latino)	38
US Hot Latin Songs (Billboard)	19
US Latin Airplay (Billboard)	23
US Latin Pop Airplay (Billboard)	7
US Latin Rhythm Airplay (Billboard)	17
Venezuela (Monitor Latino)	33

2022 year-end chart performance for "Baila Conmigo"
Chart (2022)	Position
Costa Rica Urbano (Monitor Latino)	61

== Certifications ==
Certifications and sales for "Baila Conmigo"
Region	Certification	Certified units/sales
Brazil (Pro-Música Brasil)	2× Platinum	80,000^{‡}
Poland (ZPAV)	Gold	25,000^{‡}
Spain (Promusicae)	2× Platinum	80,000^{‡}
^{‡} Sales+streaming figures based on certification alone.

== Release history ==
Release history for "Baila Conmigo"
Region	Date	Format	Label(s)	Ref.
Various	January 29, 2021	Digital download; streaming	Interscope	
Australia	January 29, 2021	Contemporary hit radio	Universal	
Latin America	January 29, 2021	Contemporary hit radio	Universal	
Italy	February 5, 2021	Contemporary hit radio	Universal	

== See also ==
- List of Billboard Argentina Hot 100 top-ten singles in 2021
- List of Billboard Hot Latin Songs and Latin Airplay number ones of 2021
