= Selfish Love (DJ Snake and Selena Gomez song) =

2021 single by DJ Snake and Selena Gomez

Single by DJ Snake and Selena Gomez

from the EP Revelación
- Language: Spanish; English
- Released: March 4, 2021
- Studio: DJ Snake's house; Gomez's house
- Genre: Tropical house; dance
- Length: 2:48
- Label: DJ Snake Music; Interscope
- Songwriters: William Grigahcine; Selena Gomez; Kat Dahlia; Marty Maro; Karen Sotomayor; Kris Floyd
- Producers: DJ Snake; Maro

DJ Snake singles chronology
| "Trust Nobody" (2020) | "Selfish Love" (2021) | "Ring the Alarm" (2021) |

Selena Gomez singles chronology
| "Baila Conmigo" (2021) | "Selfish Love" (2021) | "999" (2021) |

Music video
- "Selfish Love" on YouTube

"Selfish Love" is a song recorded by DJ Snake and Selena Gomez. It was released through Interscope Records on March 4, 2021, as the third and final single from Gomez's third EP, Revelación. "Selfish Love" marks the second collaboration between DJ Snake and Gomez, the first being "Taki Taki" in 2018.

== Background and release ==
On February 24, 2021, DJ Snake posted a video to his social media accounts displaying messages with Selena Gomez about them receiving the RIAA 4× Platinum certification plaque for "Taki Taki", their previous collab with Cardi B and Ozuna. He then sends Gomez a message reading; "I think it's time we gave them another one", followed by an audio clip. They announced the release date and title of the single the following day, February 25.

== Music video ==
The song was released on March 4, 2021, along with its music video. A music video was released alongside the song. The video is set inside an oriental hair salon, accompanied by psychedelic transitions and costumes.

== Accolades ==
Awards and nominations for "Selfish Love"
| Organization | Year | Category | Result | Ref. |
|---|---|---|---|---|
| Berlin Commercial Awards | 2021 | Best Music Video | Nominated | |
| Ciclope Latino Festival (Note: The Ciclope Festival was established in 2010 to honour craft skills in advertising around the world based on a peer-voted selection process. The Ciclope Latino Festival was launched in 2016.) | 2021 | Music Video | Nominated | |
| NRJ Music Awards | 2021 | International Collaboration of the Year | Nominated | |
| NRJ Music Awards | 2021 | Video of the Year | Nominated | |
| UK Music Video Awards | 2021 | Best Production Design Video | Won | |

== Track listing ==
- Digital download
1. "Selfish Love" – 2:48
- Digital download – Tiësto remix
1. "Selfish Love" (Tiësto remix) – 2:33
- Digital download - Jack Chirak remix
1. "Selfish Love" (Jack Chirak remix) - 2:42
- Selfish Love EP
1. "Selfish Love" (Acoustic Mix) - 2:49
2. "Selfish Love" (Jack Chirak remix) - 2:42
3. "Selfish Love" (Tiësto remix) – 2:33
4. "Selfish Love" – 2:48

== Composition ==
With the whole world being separated from each other I kept looking and working only on pure good vibes, I wanted to make music for the world and mix all my favorite influences of Afrobeat, Latin music, something that felt grounded and organic. [...] "Selfish Love" came very naturally for us and I think it's the perfect evolution for our history together.

— DJ Snake on "Selfish Love"

"Selfish Love" is a tropical house and dance song with dubstep influences, Latin, Middle Eastern and "chill" saxophone rhythms. With lyrics in both Spanish and English, the song tells the story of a girl admitting feelings of jealousy. The song was written by DJ Snake and Gomez alongside Kat Dahlia, Kris Floyd, K Sotomayor and Marty Maro, and was produced by DJ Snake and Maro.

== Credits and personnel ==
Credits adapted from Tidal.

- DJ Snake – songwriting, production, mixing
- Selena Gomez – vocals, songwriting
- Maro – songwriting, production
- K Sotomayor – songwriting
- Kat Dahlia – songwriting, backing vocals
- Kris Floyd – songwriting
- Bart Schoudel – engineering, vocal engineering
- Nicholas Mercier – engineering, mastering, mixing

== Charts ==
=== Weekly charts ===
Weekly chart performance for "Selfish Love"
| Chart (2021) | Peak position |
|---|---|
| Belgium (Ultratip Bubbling Under Flanders) | 23 |
| Belgium (Ultratop 50 Wallonia) | 13 |
| Canada Hot 100 (Billboard) | 71 |
| France (SNEP) | 54 |
| Global 200 (Billboard) | 72 |
| Global Excl. US (Billboard) | 84 |
| Ireland (IRMA) | 61 |
| Lithuania (AGATA) | 46 |
| Mexico (Mexico Español Airplay) | 21 |
| New Zealand Hot Singles (RMNZ) | 14 |
| Portugal (AFP) | 98 |
| Sweden Heatseeker (Sverigetopplistan) | 19 |
| Switzerland (Schweizer Hitparade) | 76 |
| UK Singles (Official Charts) | 93 |
| UK Dance (Official Charts) | 34 |
| US Bubbling Under Hot 100 (Billboard) | 5 |
| US Hot Dance/Electronic Songs (Billboard) | 4 |
| US Hot Latin Songs (Billboard) | 6 |

=== Year-end charts ===
Year-end chart performance for "Selfish Love"
| Chart (2021) | Position |
|---|---|
| Belgium (Ultratop Wallonia) | 72 |
| France (SNEP) | 115 |
| US Hot Dance/Electronic Songs (Billboard) | 25 |

== Certifications ==
| Region | Certification | Certified units/sales |
|---|---|---|
| Brazil (Pro-Música Brasil) | Gold | 20,000^{‡} |
| France (SNEP) | Platinum | 200,000^{‡} |
^{‡} Sales+streaming figures based on certification alone.

== Release history ==
Release dates and formats for "Selfish Love"
| Region | Date | Format | Version | Label | Ref. |
|---|---|---|---|---|---|
| Various | March 4, 2021 | Digital download; streaming | Original | Interscope | |
| United States | March 5, 2021 | Contemporary hit radio; dance radio; rhythmic contemporary | Original | Interscope | |
| Italy | April 9, 2021 | Radio airplay | Original | Universal | |
| Various | April 16, 2021 | Digital download; streaming | Tiësto remix | Interscope | |
| Various | May 7, 2021 | Digital download; streaming | EP | Interscope | |
