= Revelación =

EP by Selena Gomez
- Released: March 12, 2021
- Recorded: March–November 2020
- Genres: Reggaeton; Latin pop; alternative R&B
- Length: 19:31
- Languages: Spanish; English
- Labels: SMG Music LLC; Interscope
- Producers: Albert Hype; DJ Snake; Jota Rosa; Maro; Neon16; Tainy

Selena Gomez chronology
Rare (2020)	Revelación (2021)	I Said I Love You First (2025)

Singles from Revelación
- 1. "Baila Conmigo" Released: January 29, 2021; 2. "Selfish Love" Released: March 4, 2021

Revelación is the first extended play by American singer Selena Gomez. It was released on March 12, 2021, by SMG Music LLC and Interscope Records. Gomez collaborated with various producers, such as Albert Hype, DJ Snake, Jota Rosa, Maro, Neon16, and Tainy, to achieve her desired sound. She stated that the EP centers on themes of "strength, love, forgiveness and moving on".

The EP was supported by several singles and a promotional single: "De Una Vez", "Baila Conmigo" with Rauw Alejandro, and "Selfish Love" with DJ Snake, and is Gomez's first project to be prominently in Spanish language. It blends reggaeton, electropop, Latin pop, R&B and alternative R&B genres with urbano elements. It marks a departure from the dance-pop sound of its predecessor, Rare (2020). Upon release, Revelación received acclaim from music critics, who highlighted its tasteful production, and praised Gomez's expansion of her artistry. The EP became her best-reviewed project on Metacritic.

Commercially, Revelación debuted at number 22 on the US Billboard 200, shifting 23,000 equivalent album units in its first week of release, marking the biggest sales week for a Latin music album by a woman since Shakira's El Dorado (2017). It also debuted atop the Billboard Top Latin Albums chart, becoming the first album by a woman to do so, also since 2017's El Dorado. Revelación also debut with 8.57 million streams on Spotify in its first 24 hours, becoming the biggest debut of a female EP on the platform. Four tracks from Revelación entered on the Billboard Hot Latin Songs chart dated March 27, 2021. The music video for its opening track, "De Una Vez", was nominated for Best Short Form Music Video at the 22nd Annual Latin Grammy Awards.

Revelación was nominated for Best Latin Pop Album at the 64th Annual Grammy Awards, earning Gomez her first nomination.

== Background ==
In a February 2020 interview with Dazed, Gomez revealed that she had plans to release Spanish-language music. To tease the unveiling of new music in Spanish, in January 2021, Gomez "quoted" a tweet from January 2011 that referenced a never-released Spanish-language album, stating: "I think it will be worth the wait".

This has been something I've wanted to do for 10 years, working on a Spanish project, because I'm so, so proud of my heritage, and just genuinely felt like I wanted this to happen. Just with all the division in the world, there's something about Latin music that globally just makes people feel things, you know?

— Selena Gomez on making Spanish music, Zane Lowe

=== Recording ===
Recording of Revelación began right before the introduction of COVID-19 pandemic-related lockdowns; it was almost entirely recorded remotely, in a home recording studio, using Zoom to communicate. Gomez hired Leyla Hoyle-Guerrero, a language coach, to help restore her Spanish vocabulary, work on her accent, and practice her slang.

== Composition ==
Revelación has been described as a reggaeton, electropop, Latin pop and both R&B and alternative R&B record, with influences of urbano. It marks a departure from the dance-pop sound of its predecessor, Rare (2020). Gomez stated that the EP's themes are "strength, love, forgiveness and moving on".

== Release and promotion ==
The EP's first and only promotional single, "De Una Vez", was released on January 14, 2021. Her first venture into Latin music since the release of the Spanish-language version of her former band Selena Gomez & the Scene 2010 single "A Year Without Rain", titled "Un Año Sin Lluvia", she described the song as "a beautiful love anthem". The music video, directed by Los Pérez premiered the same day.

The EP's release was announced on January 27, 2021, along with the announcement of its lead single, "Baila Conmigo", featuring Puerto Rican rapper and singer Rauw Alejandro. The single was released on January 29, 2021, and the EP was made available for pre-order the same day. The accompanying music video also premiered along with the song and was directed by Brazilian filmmaker Fernando Nogari.

The second single from the project, a collaboration with French DJ and producer DJ Snake, titled "Selfish Love", was announced on February 25, 2021, and was released on March 4, 2021, alongside its music video, directed by Rodrigo Saavedra. The track marked the second partnership between the artists, first as a duo, following their 2018 hit single "Taki Taki" with Cardi B and Ozuna. The track listing for the EP was unveiled on March 2, 2021. In the days prior to Revelación's release, Gomez released previews of the songs yet to be released through social media. Gomez planned to embark on a tour in Latin America, but these plans were never followed through.

== Critical reception ==
Professional ratings
Aggregate scores
Source	Rating
Metacritic	83/100
Review scores
Source	Rating
AllMusic	4/5 stars
Entertainment Weekly	A−
Gigwise	7/10 stars
NME	4/5 stars
NPR	positive
Rolling Stone	3.5/5 stars

Revelación was met with critical acclaim upon release. At Metacritic, which assigns a normalized score out of 100 to ratings from publications, the album received a weighted mean score of 83 based on 4 reviews, indicating "universal acclaim". The EP is Gomez's best-reviewed project on the site.

AllMusic's Matt Collar found Gomez remaining "artistically fearless" on Revelación, by taking up her Latin roots and sophisticating her pop sound furthermore, which ensued in a "romantic atmosphere that balances chic studio-cool with warm vulnerability". Hannah Mylrea of NME stated that the EP replaces "all-out pop belters" of Gomez's older catalog with "tasteful R&B and reggaeton" that shine new confidence. Entertainment Weekly writer Marcus Jones wrote that the project succeeds in establishing Gomez's ability "to toe the line", as she does not fully embrace urbano, but adds her own twist to it. He opined that the EP is a risky venture for Gomez, calling her "a far more versatile musician than she's been given credit for". Rolling Stone critic Lucas Villa viewed Revelación as Gomez's "captivating flirtation" with Latin music, through which she discovers "her groove among the reggaetón beats". He praised Gomez's "ASMR-ready" Spanish vocals as "alluring", and Tainy's "masterful" production that blurs the lines between pop and Latin music scenes. Villa further suggested that Gomez's Spanish venture deserves a full-length studio album. Gabriella Ferlita, writing for Gigwise, remarked that the EP is not ground-breaking, but "it is fun; and quite frankly, we could all use a bit of that". She picked "De Una Vez", "Baila Conmigo" and "Selfish Love" as the best tracks, while dismissing "Buscando Amor", "Dámelo To" and "Adiós" as outdated.

=== Awards and nominations ===
Year	Awards	Category	Result	Ref.
2021	Billboard Latin Music Awards	Latin Pop Album of the Year	Nominated	
2021	Latin American Music Awards	Favorite Pop Album	Nominated	
2022	Grammy Awards	Best Latin Pop Album	Nominated	
2022	Lo Nuestro Awards	Pop – Album Of The Year	Nominated	

Revelación was nominated for Best Latin Pop Album at the 64th Annual Grammy Awards, marking Gomez's first career Grammy nomination. The album was also nominated for Favorite Pop Album at the Latin American Music Awards of 2022.

== Commercial performance ==
Revelación debuted at number 22 on the US Billboard 200, shifting 23,000 equivalent album units in its first week of release, marking the biggest sales week for a Latin album by a woman since Shakira's El Dorado in 2017. It also debuted atop the Billboard Top Latin Albums chart, becoming the first album by a woman to do so, also since 2017's El Dorado. Revelación also debuted with 8.57 million streams on Spotify in its first 24 hours, becoming the biggest debut for a female EP on the platform. Four tracks from Revelación charted on the Billboard Hot Latin Songs chart on the chart dated March 27, 2021; "Baila Conmigo", which rose to number five; "Selfish Love" at number 18; "Dámelo To" at number 20, and "De Una Vez", which re-entered at number 50. In the same week, Gomez became the first female act to top the Billboard Top Latin Albums and Latin Airplay charts simultaneously since 2010, with the EP and "Baila Conmigo" respectively.

Outside of the US, Revelación peaked at number 2 in Portugal, number 4 in Spain and number 28 in the UK.

== Track listing ==
Revelación track listing
No.	Title	Writer(s)	Producer(s)	Length
1.	"De Una Vez"	Selena Gomez; Abner Cordero Boria; Christopher Carballo Ramos; Marco Masís; Andrea Mangiamarchi; Alejandro Borrero; Ivanni Rodríguez; Ricardo López Lalinde	Albert Hype; Jota Rosa; Neon16; Tainy; Bart Schoudel^{[a]}	2:36
2.	"Buscando Amor"	Gomez; Borrero; Cordero Boria; Mangiamarchi; Masís; Rodríguez; Randy Class; Zabdiel De Jesús	Jota Rosa; Neon16; Tainy; Schoudel^{[a]}	3:08
3.	"Baila Conmigo" (with Rauw Alejandro)	Cordero Boria; Melendez; Borrero; Carballo Ramos; Edgar Barrera; Mangiamarchi; Rodríguez; Jorge A. Diaz; Masís; Gomez; Raúl Alejandro Ocasio Ruiz	Albert Hype; Jota Rosa; Neon16; Tainy; Schoudel^{[a]}	3:06
4.	"Dámelo To'" (featuring Myke Towers)	Gomez; Borrero; Carballo Ramos; Cordero Boria; Mangiamarchi; Masís; Melendez; Julia Michaels; Rodriguez; Michael Torres	Albert Hype; Jota Rosa; Neon16; Tainy; Schoudel^{[a]}	3:04
5.	"Vicio"	Gomez; Cordero Boria; Melendez; Borrero; Mangiamarchi; Gregory Aldae Hein; Rodríguez; Masís; Santiago Beltran	Albert Hype; Jota Rosa; Neon16; Tainy	2:40
6.	"Adiós"	Gomez; Cordero Boria; Borrero; Carolina Isabel Colón Juarbe; Rodríguez; Masis; Jorge Luis Perez Jr.; Juan Andrés Ceballos	Neon16; Nito; Tainy; Schoudel^{[a]}	2:10
7.	"Selfish Love" (with DJ Snake)	William Grigahcine; Gomez; Kat Dahlia; Marty Maro; Karen Sotomayor; Kris Floyd	DJ Snake; Maro	2:48
Total length:				19:34

=== Notes ===
- ^{^[a]} indicates a vocal producer

== Personnel ==
Credits adapted from Tidal.

Performers

- Selena Gomez – vocals (all tracks), background vocals (3, 7)
- Elena Rose – background vocals (1–6)
- Albert Hype – programming (1, 3, 4)
- Jota Rosa – programming (1–4, 6)
- Tainy – programming (1–4, 6)
- Kat Dahlia – background vocals (5–7)
- Nito – programming (6)

Technical

- Chris Gehringer – mastering engineer (1–6)
- Nicholas Mercier – mastering engineer, mixing engineer (7)
- Serban Ghenea – mixer (1–6)
- DJ Snake – mixer (7)
- John Hanes – mix engineer (1, 3, 6)
- Angelo Carretta – engineer (1, 3)
- Bart Schoudel – engineer (all tracks), vocal engineer (7)
- Mick Raskin – assistant recording engineer (5)
- Dante Hemingway – post-production
- Andi Elloway – post-production

Artwork

- Stephen Serrato – creative direction & graphic design
- Gerardo Santos – set design
- Camila Falquez – photographer
- Kate Young – wardrobe
- Orlando Pita – hair
- Hung Vanngo – make-up

== Charts ==
Chart performance for Revelación
Chart (2021)	Peak position
Argentine Albums (CAPIF)	10
Austrian Albums (Ö3 Austria)	33
Belgian Albums (Ultratop Flanders)	19
Belgian Albums (Ultratop Wallonia)	18
Canadian Albums (Billboard)	38
Dutch Albums (Album Top 100)	52
Finnish Albums (Suomen virallinen lista)	32
French Albums (SNEP)	36
German Albums (Offizielle Top 100)	39
Hungarian Albums (MAHASZ)	22
Italian Albums (FIMI)	33
Japanese Albums (Oricon)	103
Lithuanian Albums (AGATA)	10
Polish Albums (ZPAV)	23
Portuguese Albums (AFP)	2
Scottish Albums (Official Charts)	20
Spanish Albums (Promusicae)	4
Swiss Albums (Schweizer Hitparade)	19
UK Albums (Official Charts)	28
US Billboard 200	22
US Top Latin Albums (Billboard)	1

=== Year-end charts ===
Year-end chart performance for Revelación
Chart (2021)	Position
US Top Latin Albums (Billboard)	41
US Top Latin Pop Albums (Billboard)	6

== See also ==
- 2021 in Latin music
- List of number-one Billboard Latin Albums from the 2020s

== Release history ==
Release dates and formats for Revelación
Region	Date	Version	Format	Label	Ref.
Various	March 12, 2021	Standard	Box set; CD; digital download; streaming	Interscope	
Japan	March 19, 2021	Deluxe	CD	Universal	
United States	June 25, 2021	Standard	LP	Interscope	
