= 999 (Selena Gomez and Camilo song) =

2021 single by Selena Gomez and Camilo

Single by Selena Gomez and Camilo
- Language: Spanish
- Released: August 27, 2021
- Genre: Latin pop
- Length: 3:44
- Label: SMG Music LLC; Interscope
- Songwriters: Selena Gomez; Camilo Echeverry; Édgar Barrera
- Producers: A.C.; Camilo; Barrera

Selena Gomez singles chronology
"Selfish Love" (2021)	"999" (2021)	"Let Somebody Go" (2022)

Camilo singles chronology
"Kesi" (2021)	"999" (2021)	"Indigo" (2021)

Music video
- "999" on YouTube

"999" is a song recorded by American singer Selena Gomez and Colombian singer Camilo. It was released through Interscope Records on August 27, 2021. The song was written by Gomez, Camilo, and Édgar Barrera and is produced by Camilo and Barrera.

== Release ==
The song was first teased on Twitter with Gomez teasing the song tweeting "1000 yo sé que piensas en mí y el corazón se te mueve...si tú quieres ir a 1000...". Camilo quote tweeted her tweet saying "999... yo estoy en 999!", further confirming the collaboration. They tweeted a pre-save link shortly after. The song was released on August 27, 2021.

== Composition ==
The song described as a dreamy and rhythmic-pop song with ballad at its arrangement. Where it composed in the key of C♯ Major, with a fast tempo of 150 beats per minute and runs for three minutes and 44 seconds. Lyrically, its "about the beauty of true love".

== Music video ==
The official music video for "999" was released on the same day as the song on August 27, 2021. It was directed by Sophie Muller.

== Awards and nominations ==
Year	Awards	Category	Result	Ref.
2021	Premios Quiero	Best Extraordinary Encounter	Nominated	
2021	Lo Más Escuchado	Best International Collaboration Song	Nominated	

== Credits and personnel ==
Credits adopted from Tidal.

- Selena Gomez — vocals, lyricist, composer
- Camilo — vocals, lyricist, composer, producer
- Édgar Barrera — vocal, lyricist, composer, producer
- A.C. — producer, guitar, programmer
- Vnsa — mix engineer
- Mick Raskin — mix engineer
- Kat Dahlia — background vocals
- John Hanes — engineer, mix engineer
- Nicholas Ramirez — engineer
- Natalia Ramirez — engineer, vocal producer
- Bart Schoudel — engineer, vocal producer
- Chris Gehringer — mastering engineer
- Serban Ghenea — mixer
- Sam Riback — production coordinator
- Aleen Keshishian — production coordinator
- John Janick — production coordinator
- Nir Seroussi — production coordinator
- Zack Morgenroth — production coordinator
- Benjamin Tischker — production coordinator
- Vanessa Angiuli — production coordinator

== Charts ==
Weekly chart performance for "999"
Chart (2021)	Peak position
Argentina Hot 100 (Billboard)	88
Global Excl. US (Billboard)	196
Mexico Espanol Airplay (Billboard)	29
US Hot Latin Songs (Billboard)	25
US Latin Airplay (Billboard)	34
US Latin Pop Airplay (Billboard)	7

=== Year-end charts ===
Chart (2021)	Position
Puerto Rico (Monitor Latino)	88
Chart (2022)	Position
Dominican Republic Pop (Monitor Latino)	77
Puerto Rico Pop (Monitor Latino)	88
US Latin Pop Airplay Songs (Billboard)	44

== Release history ==
Release dates and formats for "999"
Region	Date	Format	Label	Ref.
Various	August 27, 2021	Digital download; streaming	Interscope	
