= Selena Gomez =

American actress and singer (born 1992)

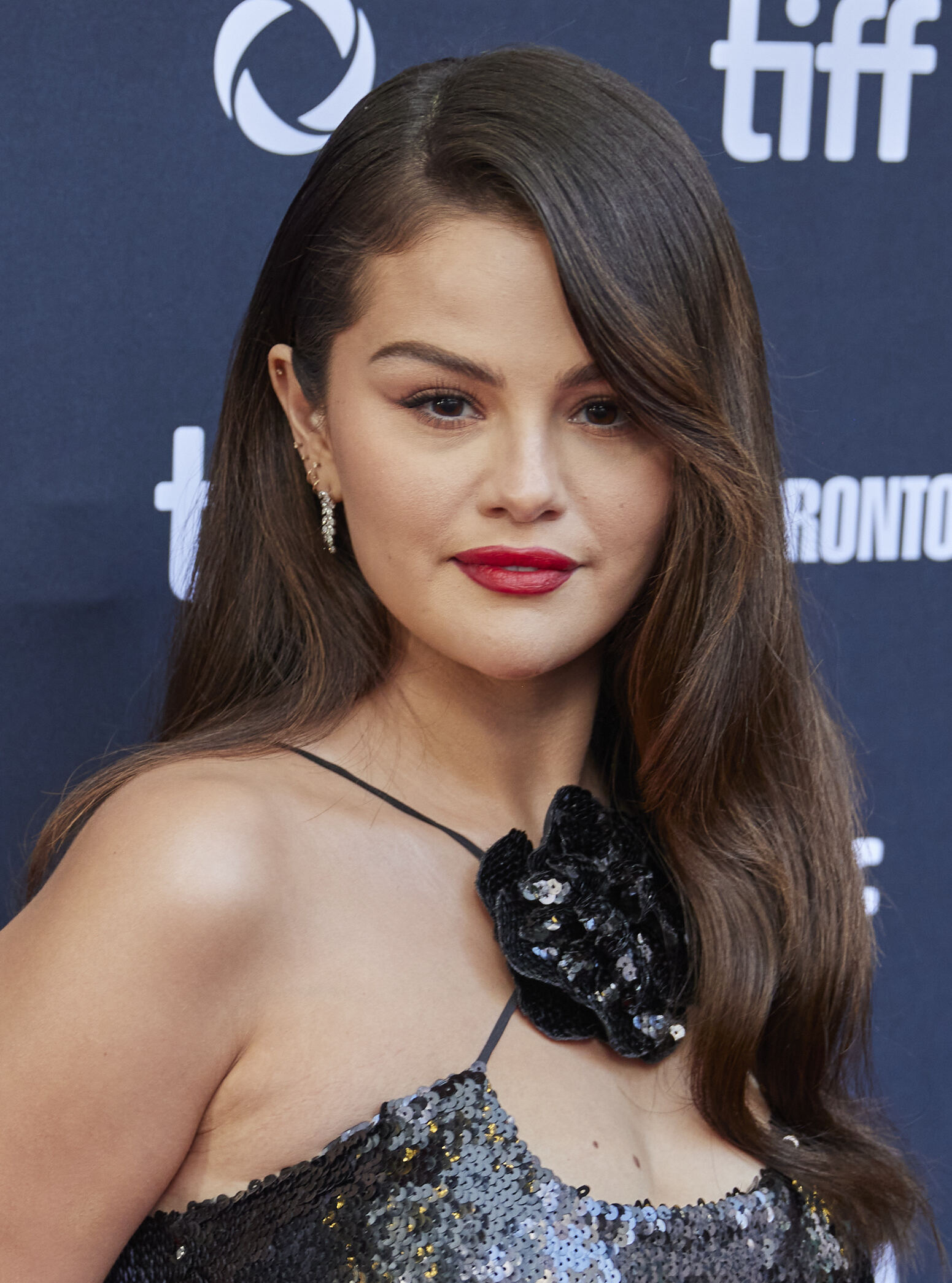
- Gomez in 2024
- Born: Selena Marie Gomez; July 22, 1992 (age 34); Grand Prairie, Texas, US
- Occupations: Actress; singer; businesswoman; songwriter; producer
- Years active: 2002–present
- Organization: Rare Beauty
- Works: Discography (Note: For her discography as Selena Gomez & the Scene, see Selena Gomez & the Scene discography.); songs recorded; performances; videography
- Spouse: Benny Blanco (m. 2025)
- Awards: Full list
- Musical career
- Genres: Pop; EDM
- Instrument: Vocals
- Labels: Walt Disney; Hollywood; Interscope
- Formerly of: Selena Gomez & the Scene
- Website: selenagomez.com

Selena Marie Gomez (born July 22, 1992) is an American actress, singer, songwriter, businesswoman, and producer. Gomez began her career as a child actress on the children's television series Barney & Friends (2002–2004), and emerged as a teen idol for her leading role as Alex Russo on the Disney Channel sitcom Wizards of Waverly Place (2007–2012). She signed with Hollywood Records in 2008 and formed the band Selena Gomez & the Scene, which released three albums: Kiss & Tell (2009), A Year Without Rain (2010), and When the Sun Goes Down (2011).

Gomez has released three solo albums. The first of these, Stars Dance (2013), featured "Come & Get It". She followed it with Revival (2015), and reached the top five of the US Billboard Hot 100 with its singles "Good for You" and "Same Old Love". Rare (2020) produced the US number-one single "Lose You to Love Me". She also launched the Spanish EP Revelación (2021) and her fourth album I Said I Love You First (2025) with her husband Benny Blanco. Other collaborations include "We Don't Talk Anymore", "It Ain't Me", "Wolves", "Taki Taki" and "Calm Down".

She has starred in films, including Another Cinderella Story (2008), Monte Carlo (2011), Spring Breakers (2012), Hotel Transylvania film franchise (2012–2022), The Fundamentals of Caring (2016), The Dead Don't Die (2019), and Emilia Pérez (2024). Gomez has produced series such as 13 Reasons Why (2017–2020), and Selena + Chef (2020–2023), and has played a lead role in Only Murders in the Building since 2021. Her accolades include an Actor Award, an American Music Award, a Billboard Music Award, a Cannes Film Festival Award, two MTV Video Music Awards and 17 Guinness World Records.

Gomez is a UNICEF Goodwill Ambassador and advocates for mental health and equality. She founded the cosmetic company Rare Beauty, which was valued at $2 billion, and the Rare Impact Fund. Recognized in listicles such as the Forbes 30 Under 30 (2016 and 2020) and Time 100 (2020), she has received various awards and honors, including Billboard's Woman of the Year (2017), and Latin Woman of the Year (2025). She is the most-followed woman on Instagram and one of the wealthiest musicians.

== Early life ==
Selena Marie Gomez was born on July 22, 1992, in Grand Prairie, Texas, a suburb of Dallas. Her parents are Ricardo Joel Gomez and Amanda Dawn "Mandy" (née Cornett) Teefey, a Texas-born former stage actress. She was named after Tejano singer Selena Quintanilla. Her father is of Mexican descent, while her mother, who was adopted, has Italian ancestry. Her paternal grandparents emigrated from Monterrey, Mexico, to Texas in the 1970s. Gomez has described herself as a "proud third-generation American-Mexican". She has said that she spoke Spanish fluently as a child, but became less fluent after she began attending school and working in entertainment.

Gomez's parents divorced when she was five years old, and she remained with her mother. She maintained ties to her Mexican heritage by spending weekends and holidays with her father, including attending quinceañera celebrations. Gomez has also said that her family was Catholic and attended church on Sundays. Her mother later married Brian Teefey, with whom she had a daughter, Gracie Elliot Teefey, in 2013. Her father also remarried, and Gomez has another half-sister and a stepbrother.

Gomez was born when her mother was 16 years old. The family faced financial difficulties during her childhood, and her mother worked three jobs to support them. Gomez recalled being stranded on the highway several times because they could not afford gasoline. Despite these hardships, she saved money to take Gomez to concerts and took her to museums and aquariums. Reflecting on her childhood, Gomez said, "We didn't have much. But I felt like we did," crediting her mother with making efforts to keep her happy. Her grandmother also helped raise her.

As a child, Gomez participated in beauty pageants and staged concerts in her family's living room. She also made short films with neighborhood children, who auditioned for roles in them. Gomez has said that her mother's involvement in theater inspired her interest in acting. Unable to afford travel for television pilot auditions, she recorded audition tapes instead. Gomez was largely homeschooled, although she briefly attended a traditional school. She also received tutoring while working on television sets and earned her high-school diploma in May 2010.

== Career ==
=== 2002–2006: Career beginnings ===
Gomez began her acting career in 2002 on the children's television series Barney & Friends, appearing in thirteen episodes through 2004 and in two related direct-to-video films. Reflecting on the experience, she said, "I was very shy when I was little [...] I didn't know what 'camera right' was. I didn't know what blocking was. I learned everything from Barney." She left the series after two seasons when producers felt she had outgrown the role. Gomez later had small roles in the family film Spy Kids 3-D: Game Over (2003) and the made-for-television film Walker, Texas Ranger: Trial by Fire (2005), and guest-starred in a 2006 episode of the Disney Channel series The Suite Life of Zack & Cody.

=== 2007–2012: Breakthrough with Disney and Selena Gomez & the Scene ===
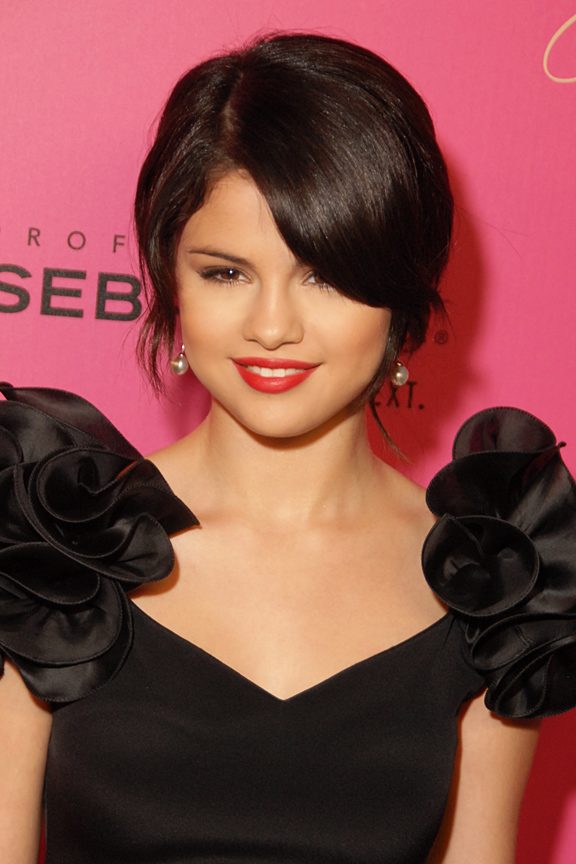
Gomez at the 2009 Hollywood Style Awards in Beverly Hills

Gomez had a recurring role on the Disney Channel series Hannah Montana in 2007 as Mikayla, a rival pop star. She rose to prominence later that year after being cast as Alex Russo in the Disney Channel sitcom Wizards of Waverly Place. Gomez and her mother subsequently moved to Los Angeles. The series premiered in October 2007 and ran for four seasons. It became a major success for the network and established Gomez as a teen idol. The show received positive reviews, with critics highlighting Gomez's sarcastic delivery; Mary McNamara of the Los Angeles Times described her as "sweet and sassy" with "great comic timing". For her performance, she earned an ALMA Award and five consecutive Kids' Choice Awards for Favorite TV Actress.

In 2008, Gomez had a minor voice role in the animated film Horton Hears a Who!. She also starred as aspiring dancer Mary Santiago in the direct-to-video teen musical comedy film Another Cinderella Story, the second installment in the A Cinderella Story series. Her performance earned her a Young Artist Award. Gomez contributed several songs to the soundtrack, including her debut single "Tell Me Something I Don't Know", which marked her first entry on the US Billboard Hot 100 chart. At age 16, Gomez signed with Hollywood Records and formed the production company July Moon Productions.

Gomez continued working with Disney Channel in 2009, appearing in Sonny with a Chance and the crossover event Wizards on Deck with Hannah Montana. She co-starred with Demi Lovato in the television film Princess Protection Program, and reprised her role as Alex Russo in Wizards of Waverly Place: The Movie. The latter premiered in August to 11.4 million viewers and became the second-highest-rated cable television film at the time, behind High School Musical 2. Roxana Hadadi of The Washington Post credited the film's young leads—Gomez, David Henrie and Jake T. Austin—with carrying the production. Gomez also recorded songs for the franchise's soundtrack, including "Magic", and voiced Princess Selenia in two films from Luc Besson's Arthur series.

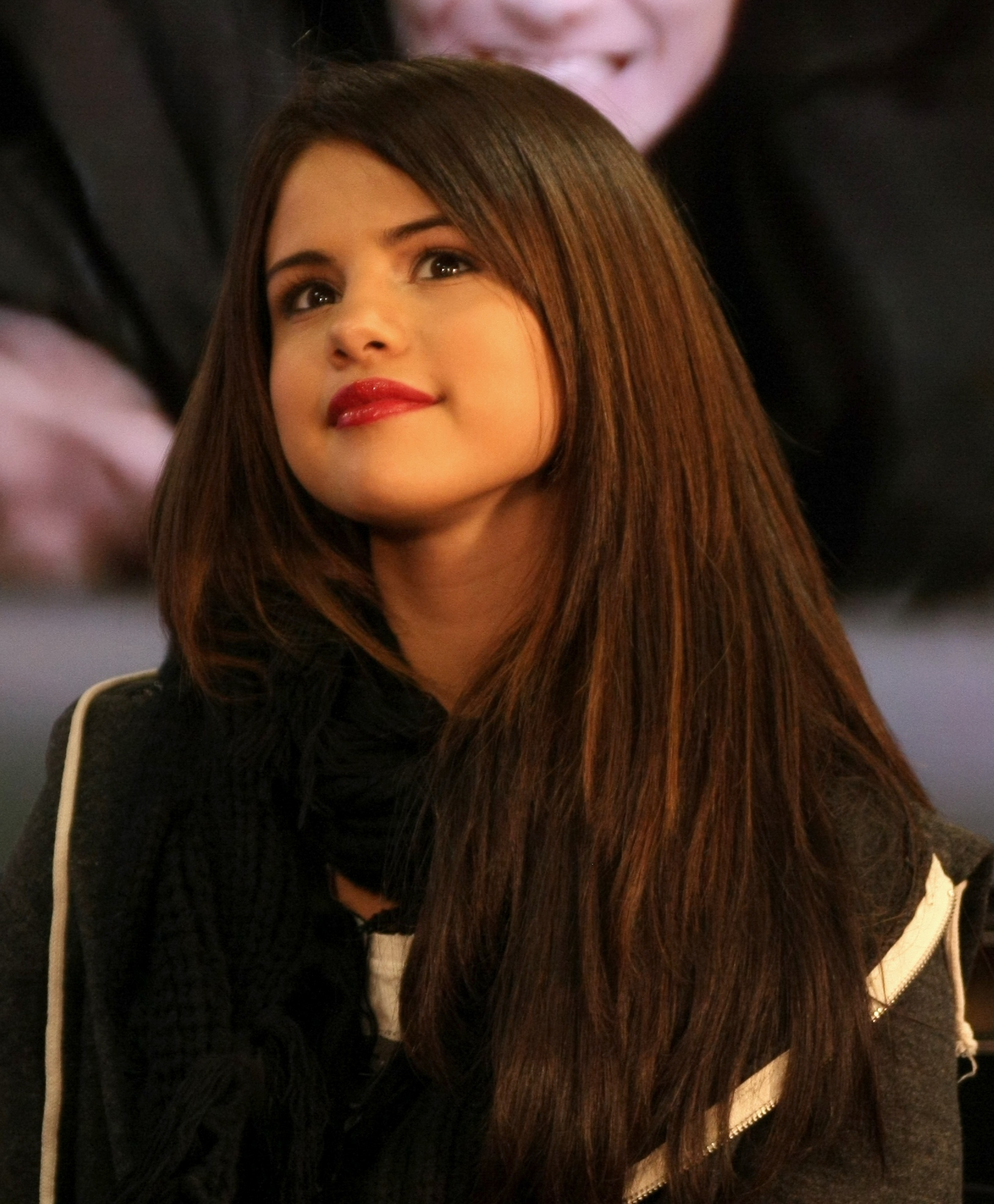
Gomez at the 2010 KISS FM Jingle Ball

Under her Hollywood Records contract, Gomez formed the band Selena Gomez & the Scene. She had initially wanted to work as part of a band rather than as a solo artist, though the label chose to attach her name to the group because of her existing "fan base". The band released three studio albums—Kiss & Tell (2009), A Year Without Rain (2010), and When the Sun Goes Down (2011)—which reached the top ten of the US Billboard 200. They found mainstream success with singles such as "Naturally", "Who Says", and "Love You Like a Love Song". Billboard later ranked the lattermost as the biggest Hot 100 hit to peak at number twenty-two.

Gomez expanded into feature film roles with the family comedy Ramona and Beezus (2010), based on Beverly Cleary's Ramona series, in which she starred opposite Joey King as Beezus Quimby. The film was well received by critics; Roger Ebert described it as "a sweet salute" and found both actresses "appealing". In 2011, Gomez starred in the romantic comedy Monte Carlo alongside Leighton Meester and Katie Cassidy, playing dual roles as Grace Bennett and her lookalike, British heiress Cordelia Winthrop-Scott. The film received mixed reviews, with critics divided over Gomez's performance, particularly her portrayal of the British character. She also made a cameo appearance in the film The Muppets.

=== 2012–2014: Stars Dance and films ===
In 2012, Selena Gomez & the Scene went on hiatus, which ultimately became a permanent split. Gomez described her time with the band as an "exploratory period" before pursuing a solo music career. That year, Wizards of Waverly Place ended its run on the Disney Channel after four seasons, and Gomez began seeking projects intended to move her beyond her Disney image.

Gomez starred in Harmony Korine's independent crime film Spring Breakers (2012), alongside James Franco, Vanessa Hudgens and Ashley Benson. The film premiered at the 69th Venice International Film Festival and was released in March 2013. Gomez portrayed Faith, a religious college student whose spring break trip takes a criminal turn. The film received generally positive reviews from critics and grossed US$31.7 million worldwide against a budget of US$5 million, and later developed a reputation as a cult classic. Manohla Dargis of The New York Times wrote that the film gave Gomez "the chance to simulate the behavior that feeds the tabloids" without the "humiliations" or "career-crushing price" associated with it.

Gomez also voiced Mavis Dracula in the animated film Hotel Transylvania (2012). The film received mixed reviews and grossed US$358 million worldwide. In 2013, she starred opposite Ethan Hawke in the action thriller Getaway, playing a young hacker. The film was critically panned and became a box-office bomb, with some critics describing Gomez as miscast. That year, she served as executive producer and reprised her role as Alex Russo in the Disney Channel television special The Wizards Return: Alex vs. Alex.

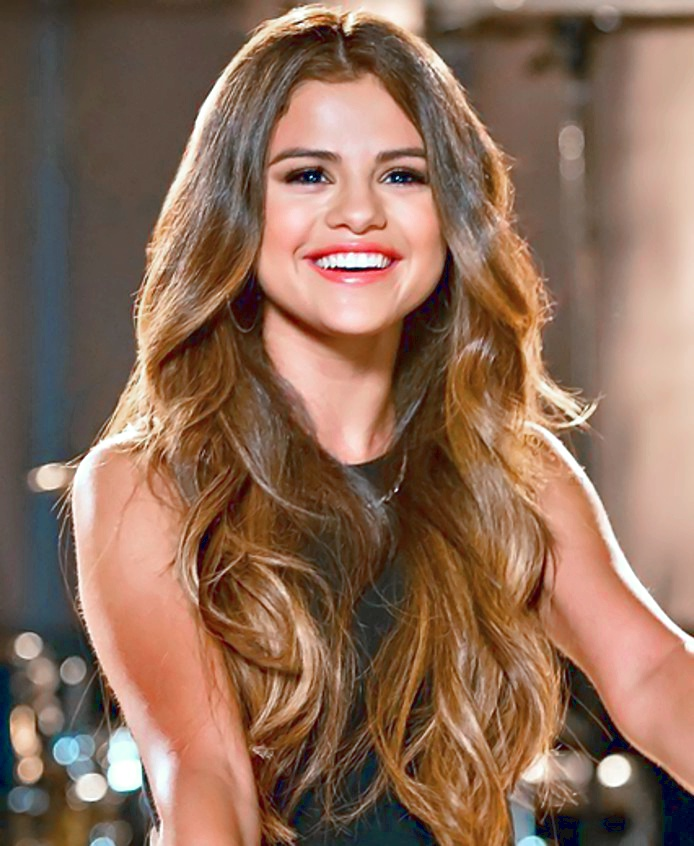
Gomez at a concert promoting Stars Dance in 2013

Despite earlier claims that she would take a break from music, Gomez released "Come & Get It" in April 2013 as the lead single from her solo debut album. The song became her first top-ten entry on the US Billboard Hot 100, peaking at number six, and reached the top ten in Canada and the UK. It later won Best Pop Video at the 2013 MTV Video Music Awards. The album, Stars Dance, was released in July 2013. Rooted in EDM and electropop, it debuted atop the US Billboard 200 with first-week sales of 97,000 copies, and also reached number one in Canada. The record received mixed reviews from music critics, some of whom felt she had yet to establish a distinct musical identity. Its second single, "Slow Down", achieved moderate success.

Gomez embarked on her Stars Dance Tour in August 2013. After performing in North America and Europe, she canceled the Australian and Asian legs of the tour in December 2013, wanting to take time for herself. In January 2014, it was reported that she had spent two weeks in treatment at the Meadows facility in Arizona. Gomez later revealed in 2015 that she was diagnosed with lupus and underwent chemotherapy, leading her to cancel tour dates in 2013.

In 2014, Gomez had a supporting role in William H. Macy's directional debut Rudderless, and starred in the teen comedy Behaving Badly. The former received mixed reviews, while the latter was critically panned, though critics deemed Gomez's performance superior to the film. That year, she ended her management arrangement with her mother and stepfather, who had managed her since her Disney years. The Hollywood Reporter reported that the move reflected a strategy to pursue more adult-oriented work in film and music. She subsequently signed with the WME and Brillstein companies to manage her career.

In November 2014, Gomez released the single "The Heart Wants What It Wants" and announced a compilation album that would complete her contract with Hollywood Records. The single peaked at number six on the Billboard Hot 100, becoming her second top-ten hit in the US. Her greatest-hits album, For You followed later that month. Gomez officially parted ways with Hollywood Records and signed with Interscope Records in December 2014.

=== 2015–2016: Revival ===
While working on her then-upcoming second studio album, Gomez collaborated with German DJ and producer Zedd on "I Want You to Know", released in February 2015, which peaked at number seventeen in the US. Later that year, she reprised her voice role as Mavis in Hotel Transylvania 2, a commercial success that grossed US$475 million worldwide, and made a cameo appearance in Adam McKay's film The Big Short.

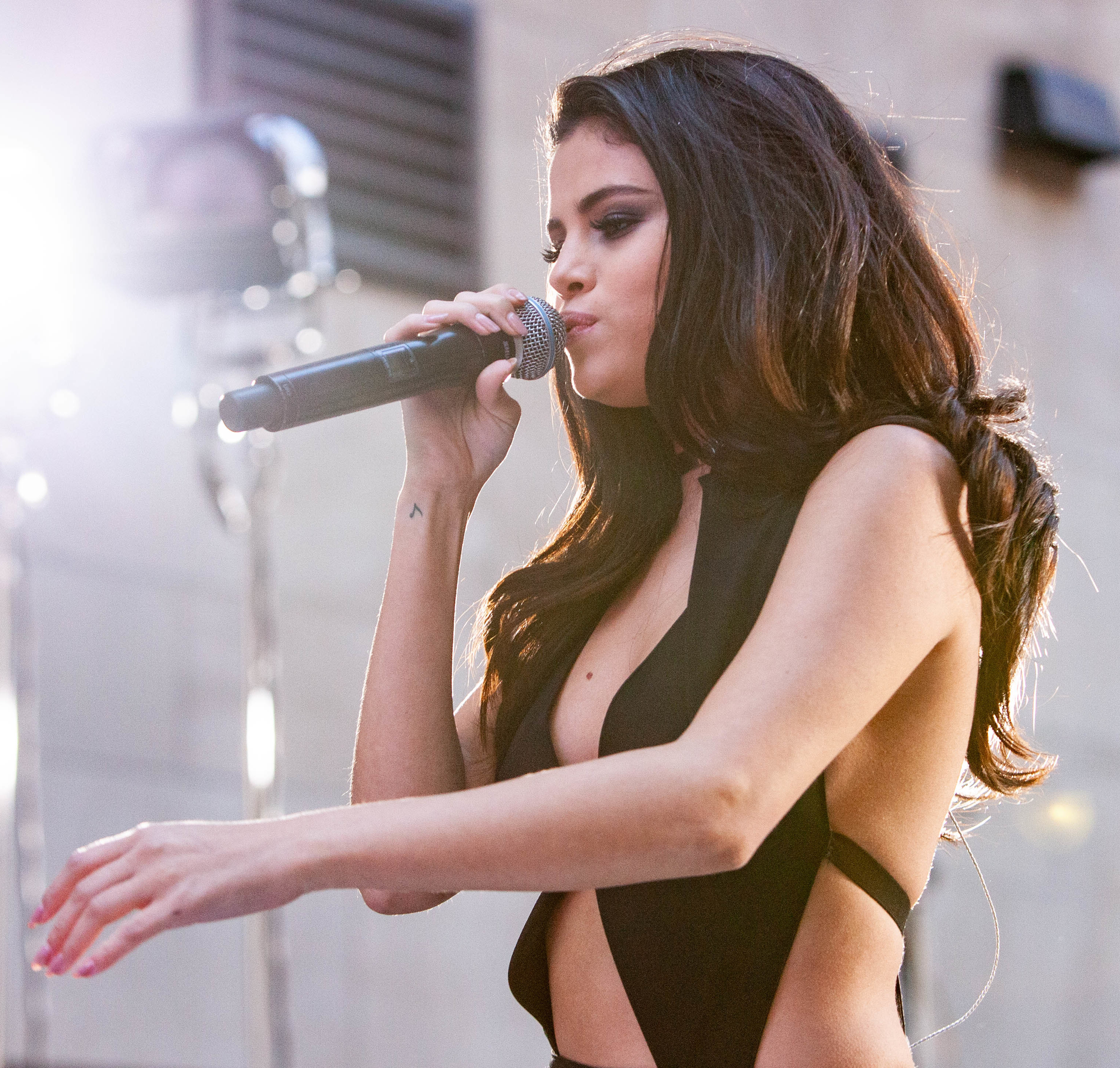
Gomez performing on The Today Show in 2015

Gomez released her second studio album, Revival, in October 2015. Primarily a dance-pop and electropop record with R&B influences, it received positive reviews from critics, who praised its production and lyrical content. Writing for Rolling Stone, Brittany Spanos described the album as "the sound of a newly empowered pop artist growing into her strengths like never before." Some critics later described Revival as an influential pop album of the 2010s. The album opened at number one on the US Billboard 200 with 117,000 album units in its first week. Its lead single, "Good for You" featuring rapper ASAP Rocky, debuted at number one on the Digital Song Sales chart with first-week sales of 179,000 copies—the highest sales week of her career for a single. The album's first three singles—"Good for You", "Same Old Love", and "Hands to Myself"—each reached the top ten in the US and topped the Pop Airplay chart, making Gomez the sixth woman to achieve three Pop Airplay number-ones from a single set. "Kill Em with Kindness" was released as the album's fourth single. Gomez received the Chart-Topper Award at the Billboard Women in Music event.

In 2016, Gomez continued promoting Revival, appearing as the musical guest on Saturday Night Live. She also starred alongside Paul Rudd in the comedy-drama The Fundamentals of Caring. The film premiered at the Sundance Film Festival and was released on Netflix in June 2016 to positive reviews. She appeared in the comedy film Neighbors 2: Sorority Rising, and had a supporting role in James Franco's drama film In Dubious Battle, which received mixed reviews.

Gomez embarked on her worldwide Revival Tour in May 2016. She began working on her third studio album while touring and added a new song titled "Feel Me" to the tour's setlist; it was later released in 2020. After completing dates in North America, Asia and Oceania, she canceled the European and South American legs in August to seek treatment for anxiety, panic attacks and depression caused by lupus. She subsequently entered a treatment facility for 90 days. That year, Gomez was featured on Charlie Puth's single "We Don't Talk Anymore", an international success that reached the top ten in the US and several international markets, including Australia, France and Spain, and topped the chart in Italy. She also appeared on Cashmere Cat's "Trust Nobody". In November 2016, she made her first public appearance in several months at the American Music Awards, where she won Favorite Pop/Rock Female Artist and was nominated for Artist of the Year. She was also nominated for Top Female Artist at the Billboard Music Awards.

=== 2017–2019: Standalone releases and 13 Reasons Why ===
Gomez released a series of standalone collaborations and singles between 2017 and 2019. Her collaboration with Norwegian DJ and producer Kygo, "It Ain't Me", was released in February 2017. The song became an international hit, reaching the top ten on most major music charts worldwide, including the US and UK, with top-five peaks in Australia, Canada, Germany and several other European countries. In May, Gomez released the single "Bad Liar", accompanied by a vertical music video available exclusively on Spotify. It was the platform's first vertical music video. The song peaked at number twenty in the US, and received widespread critical acclaim, with some deeming it Gomez's best song to date; Billboard ranked it as the best song of 2017. She followed it with "Fetish" featuring rapper Gucci Mane, and "Wolves" with Marshmello, the latter of which became an international hit, reaching the top ten in Australia, Canada, the UK, and several European countries, while peaking at number twenty in the US. Later that year, Gomez was named Billboard's Woman of the Year.

Gomez also served as an executive producer on the Netflix drama series 13 Reasons Why, adapted from Jay Asher's novel. She had initially been attached to portray Hannah Baker in a planned film adaptation before the project shifted to television, with Gomez remaining involved as an executive producer. The series premiered in March 2017. It drew criticism from mental health and suicide-prevention groups over its handling of sensitive themes. Gomez addressed the controversy, saying that the production aimed to remain faithful to the book and "do it justice," adding that backlash was inevitable and that "it's not an easy subject to talk about." Critical reception was positive for the first season but generally negative for the subsequent seasons. 13 Reasons Why was the most-watched original streaming series of 2018, and concluded after four seasons in June 2020.

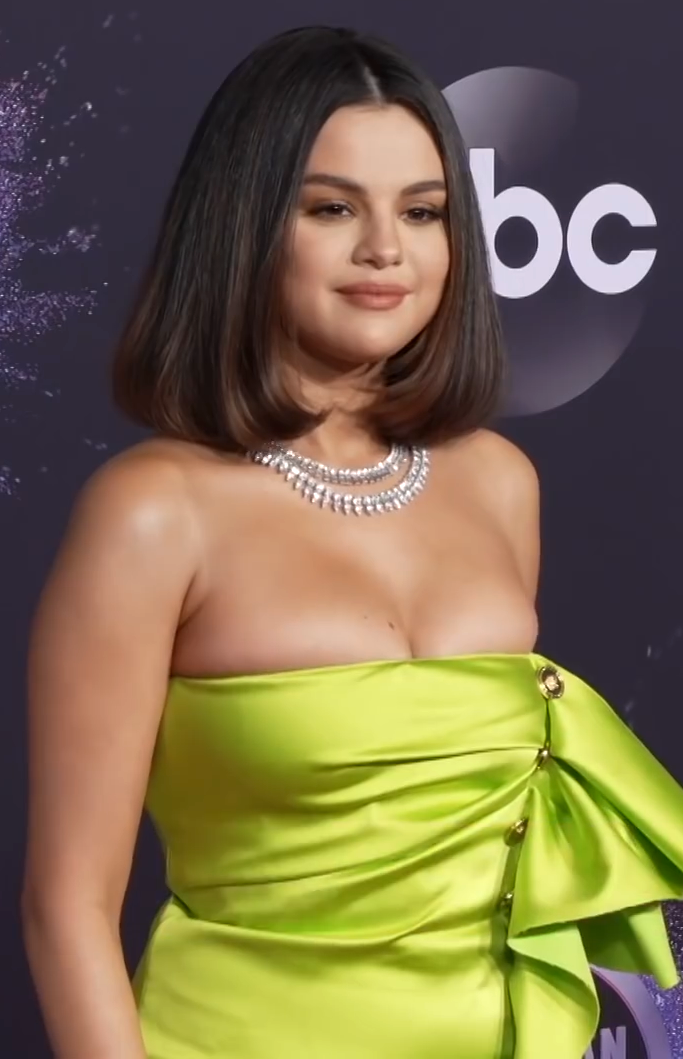
Gomez at the 2019 American Music Awards

Gomez continued releasing standalone material with "Back to You", issued in May 2018 for the soundtrack to the second season of 13 Reasons Why. The song reached the top ten in Australia, Canada, and several European countries, and peaked within the top twenty in the US and the UK. In July, she reprised Mavis in Hotel Transylvania 3: Summer Vacation, which grossed US$528 million worldwide. Later that year, she featured on DJ Snake's single "Taki Taki" alongside Ozuna and Cardi B. The single achieved global success, reaching the top ten in Canada, France, Germany, and Italy, topping the charts in Spain and several Latin American countries, while peaking at number eleven in the US. In 2019, Gomez featured on Julia Michaels's "Anxiety", and collaborated with Benny Blanco, Tainy and J Balvin on "I Can't Get Enough". Billboard noted that Gomez's 2017–2018 standalone releases contributed to her omnipresence in the streaming era, while also making her seem distant.

Gomez joined the ensemble cast of Jim Jarmusch's comedy horror The Dead Don't Die, which opened the 2019 Cannes Film Festival, and received mixed reviews. That year, she also starred in Woody Allen's romantic comedy A Rainy Day in New York, alongside Timothée Chalamet and Elle Fanning. Amid renewed attention to the 1992 sexual abuse allegation against Allen prompted by the MeToo movement, Gomez donated over $1 million—more than her salary from the film—to the Time's Up initiative. Although the film garnered mixed reviews, Gomez's performance was praised; Jessica Kiang of Variety wrote that she "comes out the best of the younger cast, husking her way through some of the film's better lines."

Gomez also served as an executive producer for the Netflix docuseries Living Undocumented, released in October 2019, which follows eight undocumented families in the US. In an op-ed for Time, she wrote that she joined the project after viewing footage that captured the "shame, uncertainty, and fear" her own family had experienced, as well as the "hope, optimism, and patriotism" many undocumented immigrants still hold.

=== 2020–2023: Rare, Revelación, and Only Murders in the Building ===
Gomez released her third studio album, Rare, in January 2020. Primarily a dance-pop record, it incorporates elements of R&B and electronic music. Critics responded positively, praising its production and cohesiveness, with several publications describing it as Gomez's best album to date. Jem Aswad of Variety labeled Rare "one of the best pop albums to be released in recent memory". The album debuted atop the Billboard 200 with 112,000 album-equivalent units in its first week, becoming her third consecutive number-one album in the US. It also topped the charts in Australia, Canada, and several territories, and peaked at number two in the UK. Its lead single, "Lose You to Love Me", became Gomez's first number-one song in the US and Canada, and reached the top five on various national charts, including Australia and the UK. "Look at Her Now", the title track, and "Boyfriend" were also released from the album. Later that year, Gomez appeared on the remix of Trevor Daniel's "Past Life", and collaborated with South Korean girl group Blackpink on "Ice Cream", which peaked at number thirteen in the US, and reached the top ten on the Billboard Global 200.

In film and television, Gomez had a voice role in the adventure film Dolittle (2020). She then hosted and executive produced the HBO Max cooking show Selena + Chef, which premiered in August 2020 and was initially filmed remotely due to the COVID-19 pandemic. The series ran for four seasons, and later expanded into additional Food Network spin-offs. Her work across the franchise earned her three Daytime Emmy Award nominations. She also executive produced two films: the teen comedy-drama This Is the Year, and the romantic comedy The Broken Hearts Gallery; the latter received positive reviews from critics. That year, the Latin Recording Academy honored her as one of its Leading Ladies of Entertainment, and Time named her one of the 100 most influential people in the world.

Gomez released her first Spanish-language project, an EP titled Revelación, in March 2021. Incorporating reggaeton and Latin pop with urbano elements, it marked a stylistic departure from the dance-pop sound of Rare. The project debuted atop the Billboard Top Latin Albums chart, becoming the first album by a female act to top the chart since Shakira's El Dorado in 2017. The EP received positive reviews, and was nominated for the Grammy Award for Best Latin Pop Album. It was preceded by the promotional single "De Una Vez", and supported by the singles "Baila Conmigo" with Rauw Alejandro, and "Selfish Love" with DJ Snake. With Revelación and "Baila Conmigo", she became the first female act to top simultaneously the US Latin Albums and Latin Airplay charts in over a decade. Gomez later collaborated with Colombian singer Camilo on the single "999".

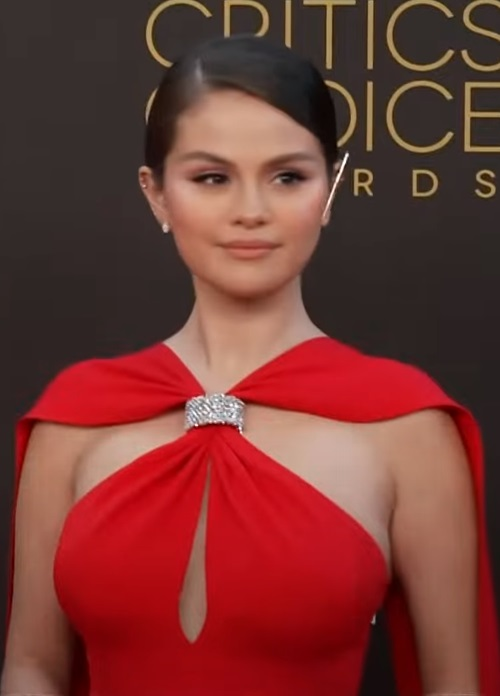
Gomez at the 2022 Critics' Choice Awards

Gomez starred in and executive produced the mystery-comedy series Only Murders in the Building alongside Steve Martin and Martin Short, portraying Mabel Mora. The series premiered in August 2021 and became Hulu's most-watched comedy premiere at the time. Ahead of the premiere, Gomez said she felt more in control of her return to television, naming the sophistication of the material as her main reason for joining the series and noting that she appreciated being cast as a character her own age. The series has received critical acclaim since its debut, with critics highlighting the chemistry among the three leads, and Gomez's dry, deadpan delivery. Richard Roeper of the Chicago Sun-Times wrote: "Gomez is a true co-star in the series and does a superb job of meshing with Martin and Short to form one of the more entertaining albeit unlikely friendship trios in recent memory." For her performance, Gomez won the Satellite Award for Best Actress – Television Series Musical or Comedy, and received nominations for the Critics' Choice Award and the Primetime Emmy Award, as well as four Golden Globe Award nominations, all for Best Actress in a Comedy Series. The cast later won the SAG Award for Outstanding Ensemble in a Comedy Series in 2025, while Gomez has received five Primetime Emmy Award nominations as an executive producer for Outstanding Comedy Series.

Gomez reprised Mavis and served as an executive producer for the animated film Hotel Transylvania: Transformania, released on Amazon Prime Video in January 2022. She collaborated with Coldplay on "Let Somebody Go", released as a single in February, hosted an episode of Saturday Night Live in May, and executive produced the ViX+ docuseries Mi vecino, el cartel. In August, she was featured on the remix of Nigerian singer Rema's single "Calm Down". The song became a major international hit, reaching number three on both the Billboard Global 200 and the Hot 100. It marked Gomez's ninth top-ten entry in the US and her second number-one hit in Canada. In the US, the song topped Billboard's all-genre Radio Songs chart for ten weeks and became the longest-charting song on the Pop Airplay chart. Billboard described the track as "Afrobeats' biggest crossover hit," while the International Federation of the Phonographic Industry (IFPI) ranked it as the second best-selling song worldwide of 2023. At the 2023 Billboard Music Awards, it received five nominations, winning Top Afrobeats Song, and won Best Afrobeats at the MTV Video Music Awards.

Gomez was the subject of the documentary film Selena Gomez: My Mind & Me, directed by Alek Keshishian. It premiered at the AFI Fest in November 2022, and was subsequently released on Apple TV+ and in select theaters. Critics responded positively, particularly to its candid approach to mental health. She released the accompanying song "My Mind & Me". In August 2023, she released the standalone single "Single Soon", which reached the top twenty on the Billboard Global 200 and in the US.

=== 2024–present: Continued acting and I Said I Love You First ===
In January 2024, Gomez admitted to having a preference for acting over music and mentioned having "one more album in me". She said she had "never really intended on being a singer full-time", but "that hobby" evolved into a career during her days working with Disney. The following month, she released the standalone single "Love On". In November, she clarified that "music isn't going away" and that she had "just set it down for a second".

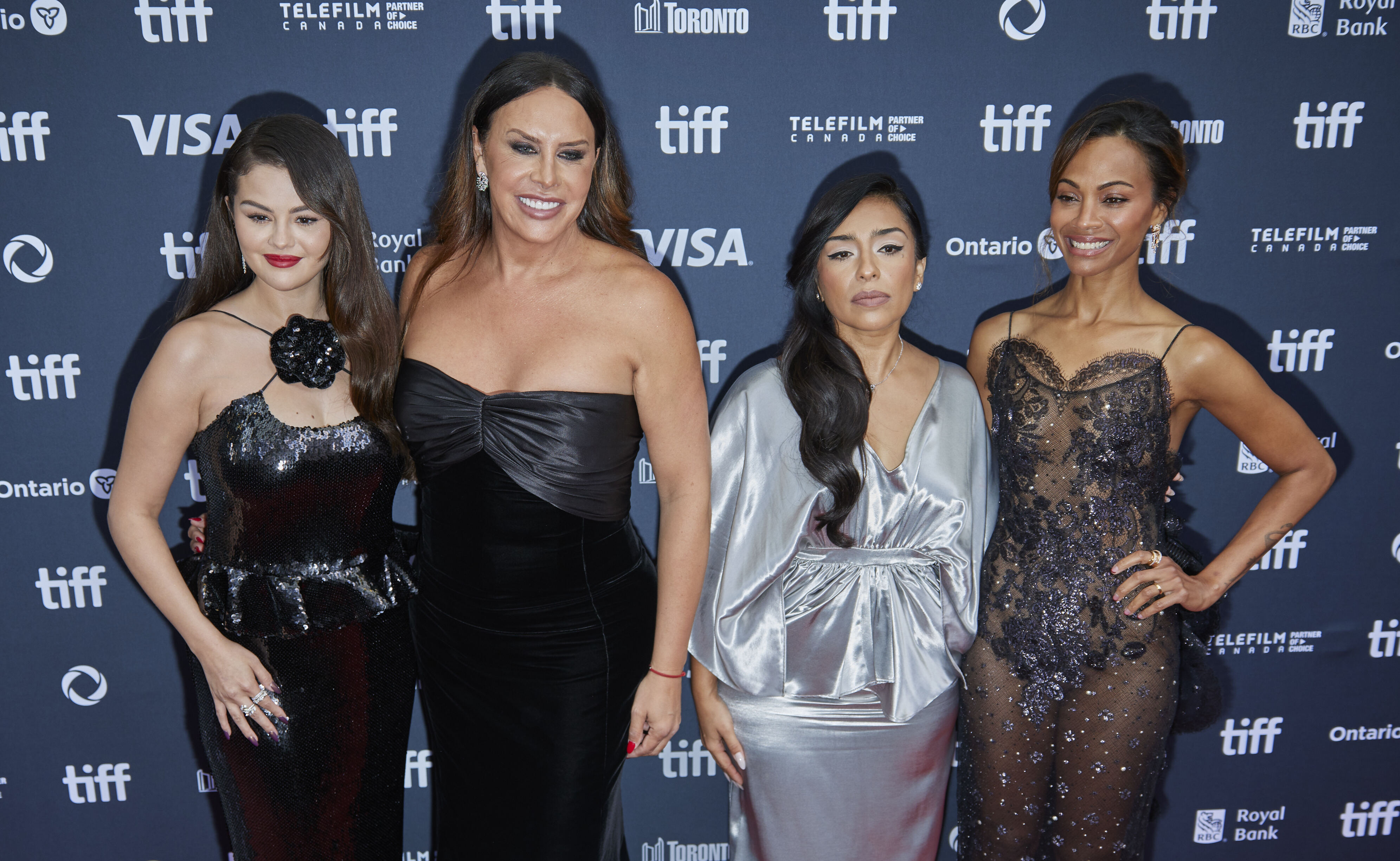
Gomez with her co-stars of Emilia Pérez (2024), all of whom were awarded the Cannes Film Festival Award for Best Actress

Gomez starred in Jacques Audiard's Spanish-language musical crime film Emilia Pérez, portraying Jessi, the wife of the title character, a former cartel leader. She took Spanish lessons for the role. The film premiered at the 2024 Cannes Film Festival, where Gomez and her co-stars—Karla Sofía Gascón, Adriana Paz, and Zoe Saldaña—jointly won the Best Actress Award. The film received generally positive reviews, though it drew criticism for its depiction of Mexico and transgender identity. Critics praised Gomez's presence and emotional range, although her Spanish pronunciation drew criticism. David Rooney of The Hollywood Reporter noted that although her role is less central, Gomez effectively conveyed both Jessi's "hard edges" and vulnerability. Gomez received nominations for the BAFTA Award and Golden Globe Award for Best Supporting Actress, while the ensemble cast was nominated for a Critics' Choice Award and a SAG Award. She also performed two songs for the film's soundtrack, including "Mi camino".

Gomez co-produced and appeared in the documentary Louder: The Soundtrack of Change, released on HBO Max in October 2024. She returned to the Wizards of Waverly Place franchise as an executive producer and recurring guest star on Wizards Beyond Waverly Place, reprising her role as Alex Russo. The series premiered on Disney Channel and Disney+ in October 2024, and concluded with its third season in August 2026. Gomez made her directorial debut with the third-season premiere.

In March 2025, Gomez and record producer Benny Blanco released the collaborative album I Said I Love You First. It received generally favorable reviews and debuted at number two on the Billboard 200, with 120,000 units, marking the largest sales week of Gomez's career. The album also reached the top five in several countries, including Australia, Germany, and the UK. It was supported by the singles "Call Me When You Break Up" with Gracie Abrams, "Sunset Blvd", and "Ojos Tristes" with The Marías. The latter became the inaugural number-one on Billboard's Hot Latin Pop Songs chart. The track "Bluest Flame" received a nomination for the Grammy Award for Best Dance Pop Recording. In April, Gomez was named Billboard Latin Women of the Year. Later that year, she released the single "In the Dark" for the soundtrack to the second season of the Netflix series Nobody Wants This.

In May 2026, Gomez was confirmed to star alongside Cate Blanchett and Michael Fassbender in Brady Corbet's upcoming film The Origin of the World. The following month, Gomez was announced to voice Fran in the animated film Not Alone, scheduled for theatrical release in April 2027. In July, Gomez collaborated with Benny Blanco and Becky G on the single "Te Olvido (La La)". She is also set to executive produce The Haunting of Hotel Transylvania, the new installment in the Hotel Transylvania film franchise, scheduled for theatrical release in October 2027.

== Artistry ==
=== Acting approach ===
Gomez's performance as Alex Russo was noted for its comic timing and sarcastic edge, which helped distinguish Wizards of Waverly Place from comparable youth-oriented sitcoms. In later years, critics described her comic delivery as dry and deadpan, particularly when portraying Mabel Mora in Only Murders in the Building. She compared Mabel Mora to "an older version" of Alex Russo, while People noted that both characters share a dry, sarcastic wit. Steve Martin praised Gomez's approach to performance, saying that she understood that "quiet acting is powerful acting".

Gomez has expressed a preference for working with auteur filmmakers and taking on unconventional supporting roles. She described her role in Spring Breakers as a turning point in her acting career. When accepting the Spotlight Award at the 2024 IndieWire honors, Gomez mentioned having long been drawn to independent film and credited directors such as Harmony Korine, Jim Jarmusch, and Jacques Audiard with helping shape her as an actress. She also has discussed preferring smaller parts in distinctive films over more conventional leading roles, saying "I'd rather have four scenes in a Martin Scorsese film" than star in a standard coming-of-age romance.

=== Musical style ===
Gomez is a pop artist whose music primarily encompasses dance-pop. Her early recordings with Selena Gomez & the Scene incorporated electronic rock and pop rock influences, before transitioning toward dance-pop and electropop on later releases. Stars Dance adopted an EDM-pop sound incorporating electronic, disco, techno, and dancehall influences, which she described as "baby dubstep". The 2014 single "The Heart Wants What It Wants" has been described as a turning point in her musical direction, introducing darker themes and more personal lyrical subject matter.

Revival incorporated dance-pop, electropop, and R&B influences, and was described as marking a more mature artistic phase in Gomez's career. Gomez said she was more creatively involved in the album's writing process than on her previous releases. Billboard wrote that Revival helped define her restrained vocal style, often described as "soft, delicate, husky, and whispery", and linked the album to mainstream pop's mid-2010s shift away from EDM maximalism toward softer, R&B-inflected production. Its follow-up, Rare, was noted for its more personal and introspective themes inspired by Gomez's experiences, while her Spanish-language EP Revelación explored reggaeton, Latin pop, and urbano influences. Critics have highlighted Gomez's artistic versatility; Entertainment Weekly critic Marcus Jones described her as "a far more versatile musician than she's been given credit for".

Writing for The Guardian, Peter Robinson credited Gomez with popularizing so-called "whisper pop", a style characterized by soft and hushed vocal performances; songs such as "Good for You" and "Bad Liar" were described as representing the apotheosis of the style. Other songwriting briefs reportedly sought a "Selena whisper sound". Producer Tainy described her voice as distinctive and said that she conveys emotion through "subtlety" rather than power. Gomez has said that her strengths as a singer lie in storytelling and performing in a lower vocal register with a softer tone. Rolling Stone critic Rob Sheffield observed that Gomez often sings about her emotions with a sense of vulnerability and described her lyrics as forming an "awesomely contorted private language" that is instantly recognizable.

=== Influences ===
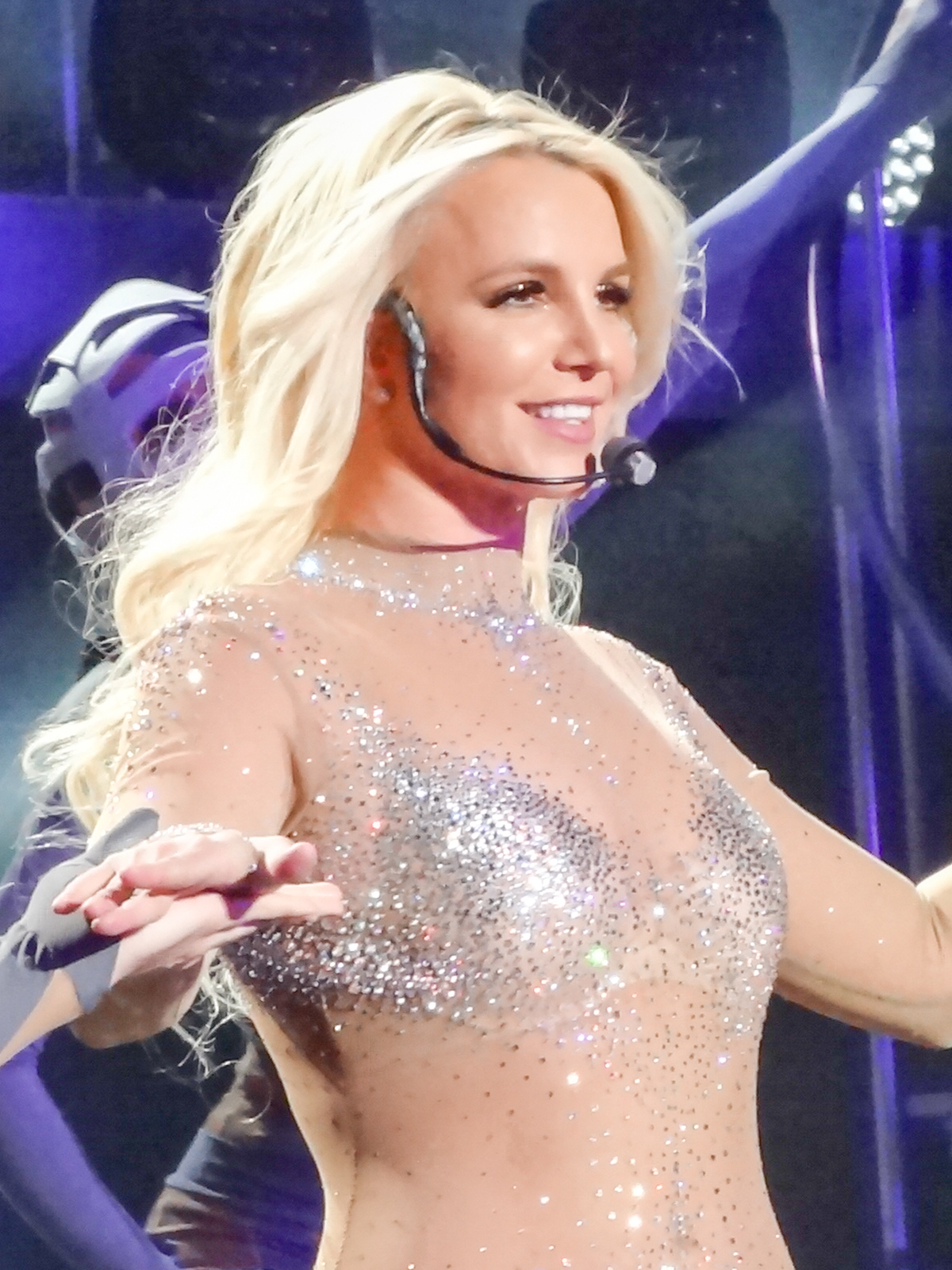
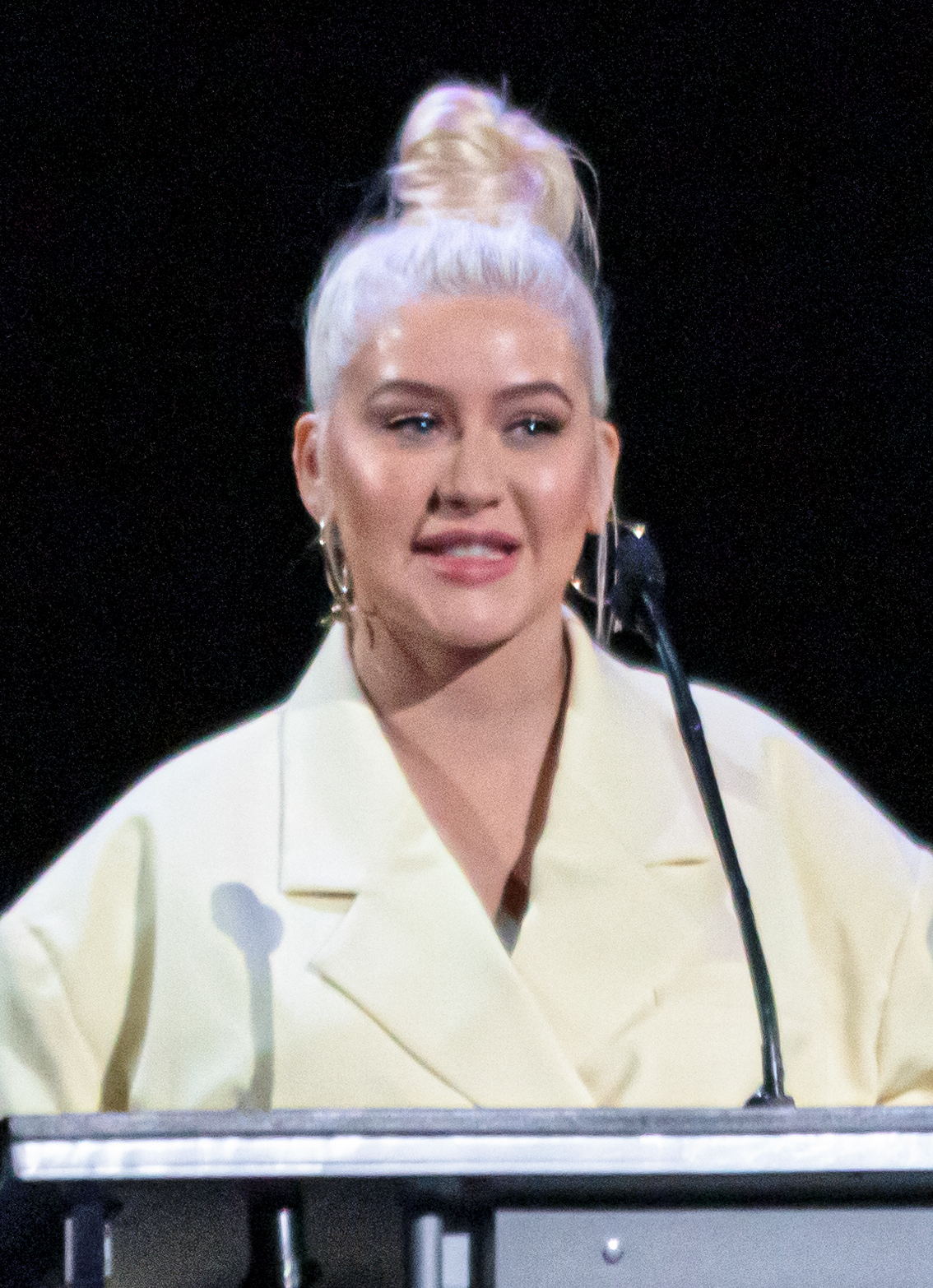
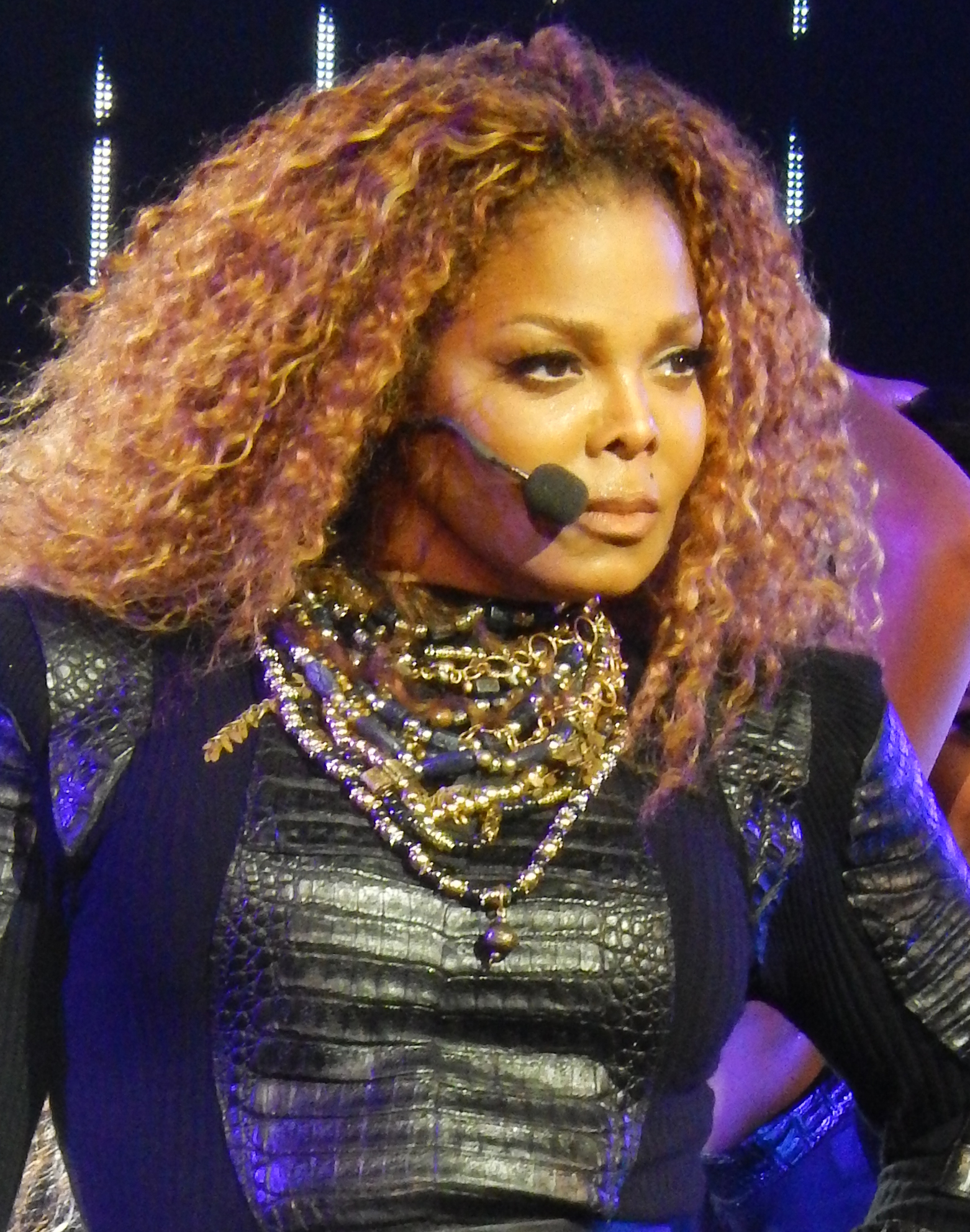
Gomez's musical influences include (left to right) Britney Spears, Christina Aguilera, and Janet Jackson.

As an actress, Gomez has cited Judy Garland as a childhood role model and credited The Wizard of Oz (1939) and Alice in Wonderland (1951) with inspiring her to pursue acting. She has said that Jennifer Aniston influenced the mannerisms she used while portraying Alex Russo, and has named Friends as an influence on her comedic timing. Earlier in her career, Gomez called Shia LaBeouf and Rachel McAdams models for her film career, admiring LaBeouf's transition from Disney Channel to film roles in adulthood and McAdams's versatility and approach to choosing projects. Gomez has also cited Meryl Streep as a longtime acting inspiration, admiring her ability to portray complex characters. After working with Streep on Only Murders in the Building, she praised her humility, professionalism, and commitment to her craft.

Musically, Gomez grew up listening to artists such as Britney Spears, Christina Aguilera, Janet Jackson, and NSYNC. Inspired by rock bands Paramore and Fall Out Boy, she chose to form Selena Gomez & the Scene rather than initially pursue a solo music career. She has cited Spears as a major inspiration for her performances and described her as a "huge inspiration" when seeking to shed her Disney image. Spears and Jackson also influenced the dance-focused concept of the Stars Dance Tour, while EDM producer Skrillex influenced the sound of Stars Dance, particularly through his work on the Spring Breakers score. Gomez has described Aguilera's Stripped (2002) as a favorite album and an influence on the conceptual approach behind Revival. For Revelación, Gomez drew inspiration from reggaeton, a genre she had enjoyed since her youth.

Gomez's musical influences also include Bruno Mars, Rihanna, and Taylor Swift, whose songwriting and ability to transition between genres Gomez has praised. She additionally has taken inspiration from singers of earlier eras, including Billie Holiday, Patsy Cline, Carole King and Ella Fitzgerald, noting that she is drawn to the "smoky, soft tenderness" and distinct vocal tones of their voices.

== Philanthropy and advocacy ==
=== UNICEF ===
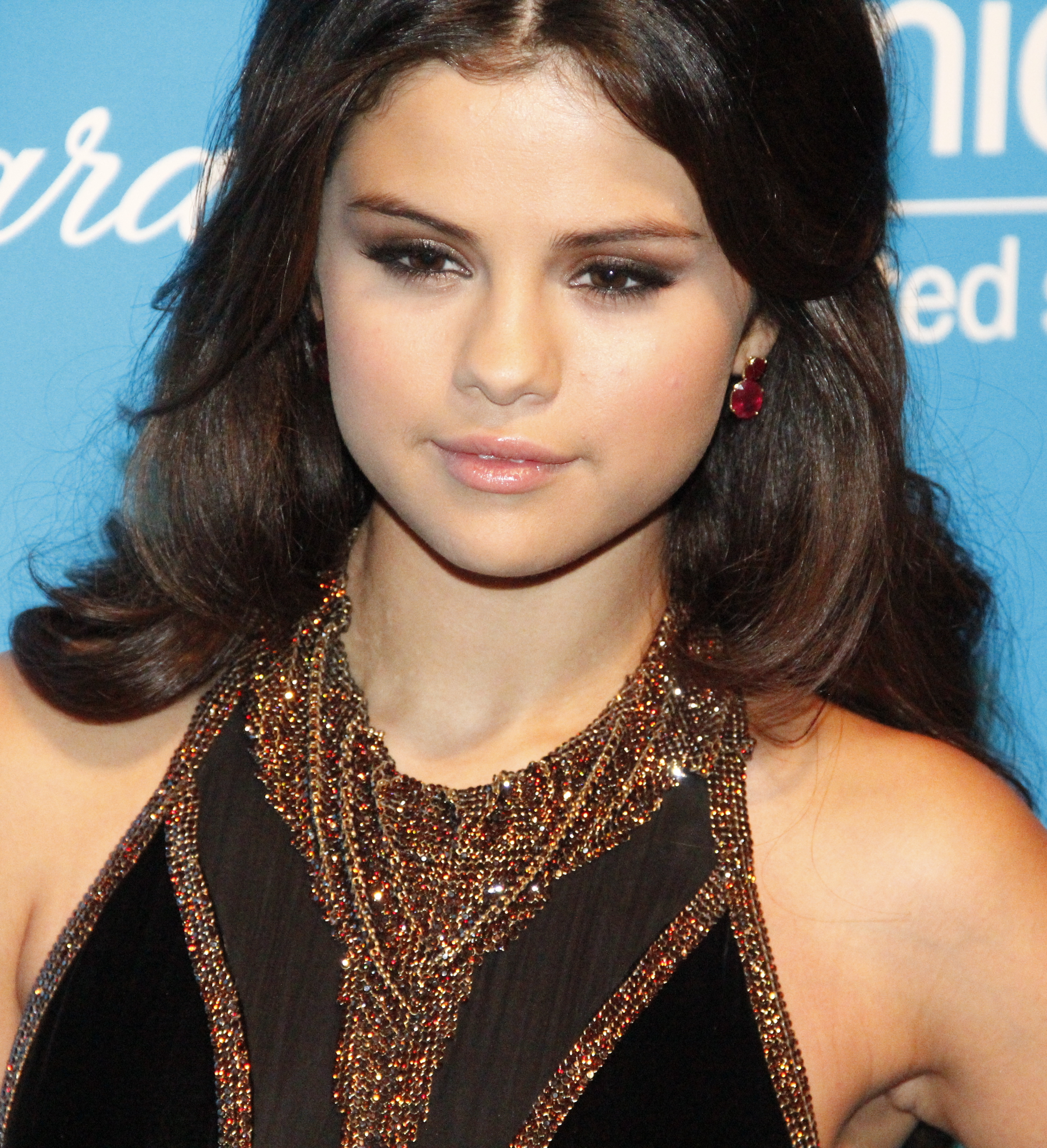
Gomez at the UNICEF 2012 Snowflake Ball in New York City

Gomez has been involved with UNICEF since 2008, when she was named spokesperson for Trick-or-Treat for UNICEF, a Halloween fundraising campaign that raised more than US$700,000 that year. In September 2009, at age 17, she was appointed as a UNICEF Goodwill Ambassador, becoming the organization's youngest ambassador at the time. Later that month, she undertook her first official field mission to Ghana, where she visited programs focused on clean water, nutrition, education, and healthcare.

Gomez continued her involvement with the Trick-or-Treat campaign and other UNICEF fundraising initiatives, including a benefit concert marking the campaign's 60th anniversary in 2010. From 2010 to 2013, she conducted three Acoustic Charity Concerts benefiting UNICEF, which collectively raised nearly US$400,000 for programs supporting nutrition, clean water, medicine, and education.

Her later field work included a 2011 visit to Chile, where she observed the UNICEF-supported Programa Puente initiative assisting vulnerable families with early childhood development and parenting support, and a 2014 trip to Nepal to raise awareness of children in need and access to education. She also supported campaigns addressing clean water and malnutrition, including the Tap Project in 2011 and Sound the Alarm in 2012.

During the COVID-19 pandemic, Gomez participated in a collective UNICEF fundraising effort supporting vaccination initiatives. In 2021, she also signed an open letter urging G7 nations to increase vaccine donations through the COVAX initiative.

=== Other charity work ===
Beyond her work with UNICEF, Gomez has supported various charitable initiatives. In 2009, she became an ambassador for DoSomething, and participated in Disney's Friends for Change campaign, recording the charity single "Send It On" with Demi Lovato, Miley Cyrus, and the Jonas Brothers. The song debuted at number 20 in the US and raised more than US$500,000 for conservation projects worldwide. She later became an ambassador for the Ryan Seacrest Foundation and, through the Make-A-Wish Foundation, had granted more than 90 wishes by 2013.

Following the 2016 Pulse nightclub shooting, Gomez collaborated with other artists on the charity single "Hands" to raise funds for Equality Florida's Pulse Victims Fund, GLAAD, and the LGBT Community Center of Central Florida. She also supported the Lupus Research Alliance by donating a portion of ticket sales from her Revival Tour and encouraging public donations, helping raise nearly US$500,000 for research. In 2017, she partnered with the Keck School of Medicine of the University of Southern California to establish the Selena Gomez Fund for Lupus Research; Puma later donated US$100,000 from the proceeds of its collaboration with Gomez to the fund. She also partnered with the Coach Foundation in its support of Step Up, a nonprofit organization mentoring girls from under-resourced communities. In 2018, she revealed that she had been volunteering with A21, an anti-human trafficking organization.

In 2020, in conjunction with the launch of her cosmetics company Rare Beauty, Gomez founded the Rare Impact Fund, which aims to raise US$100 million over ten years to expand access to youth mental health services and education. One percent of Rare Beauty's sales supports the initiative, which had raised more than US$30 million by April 2026. Since 2023, she has hosted the annual Rare Impact Fund Benefit. In June 2020, she partnered with PLUS1 to launch the Black Equality Fund, directing proceeds to organizations supporting racial justice. Gomez has also incorporated charitable giving into several professional projects, including Selena + Chef, which donated US$10,000 per episode to selected charities and raised US$400,000 in total, as well as brand partnerships that have directed portions of proceeds to the Rare Impact Fund.

Gomez has contributed to humanitarian relief efforts, including pledging donations during the 2019–20 Australian bushfire season. In 2023, amid the Gaza war, Gomez and Rare Beauty announced donations to Magen David Adom and the Palestinian Red Crescent Society to support urgent care efforts, as well as to UNICEF to provide medical relief and resources to children in Gaza. The inclusion of Magen David Adom among the recipient organizations drew criticism from some commentators, while others expressed support for the humanitarian focus of the initiative. During the 2025 Southern California wildfires, Gomez volunteered in local relief efforts, while Rare Beauty assembled emergency care kits and made donations to the Los Angeles Fire Department Foundation and World Central Kitchen.

=== Advocacy ===
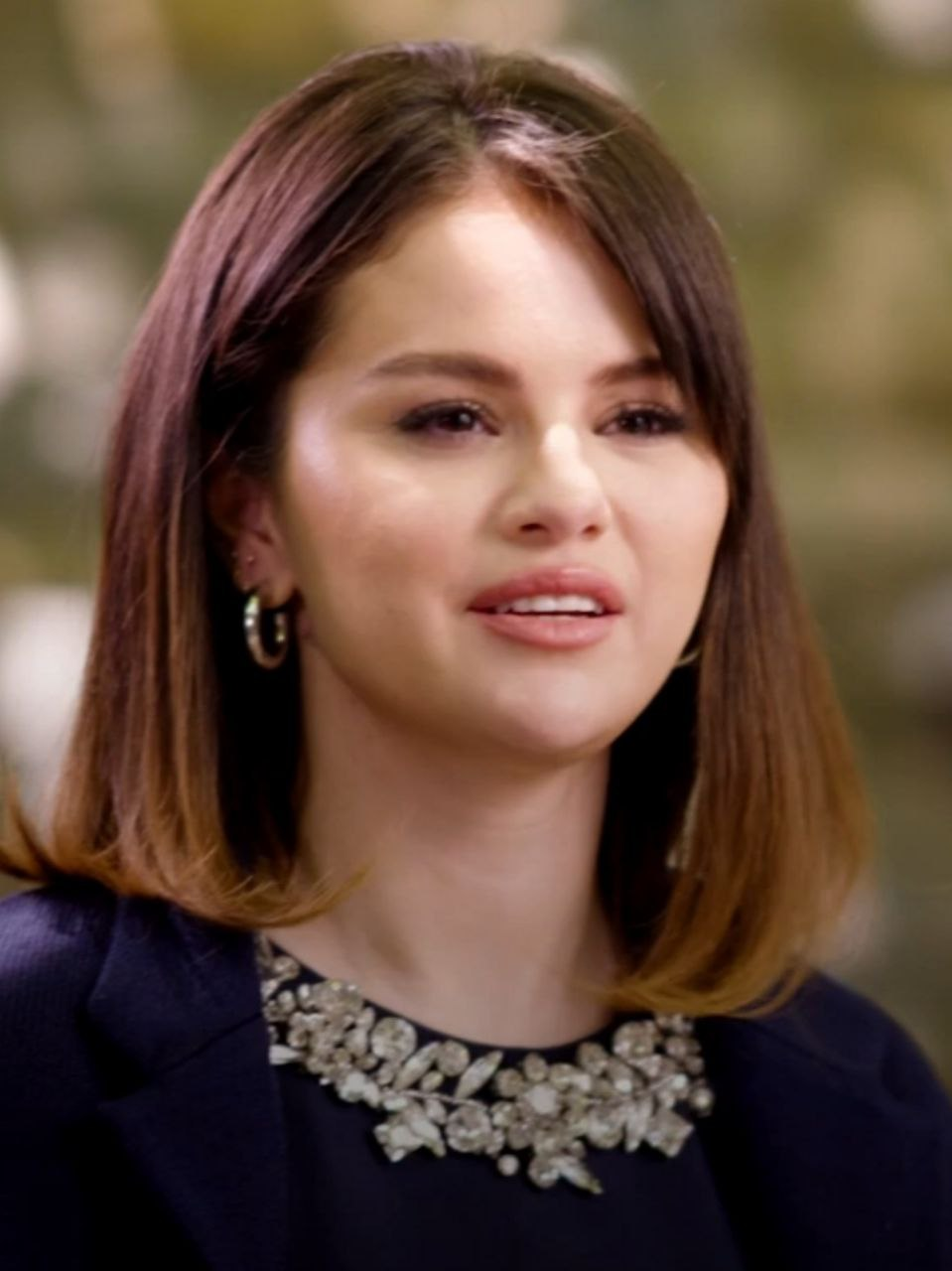
Gomez at the White House in 2022

Gomez has been an outspoken advocate for mental health awareness and has spoken openly about her own experiences with mental health challenges. She received the McLean Award for mental health advocacy in 2019, and was honored by the Stanford Healthcare Innovation Lab and the Ruderman Family Foundation in 2022. In May 2022, she participated in the inaugural Mental Health Youth Action Forum at the White House. Since 2023, she has hosted the inaugural Rare Beauty Mental Health Summit. In April 2024, she discussed mental health and the effects of social media at the TIME100 Summit.

Gomez has also participated in civic and youth-focused initiatives. She served as a spokesperson for the UR Votes Count campaign in 2008, narrated the documentary Girl Rising (2013), which promoted girls' education worldwide, and hosted several We Day events between 2014 and 2017. In 2019, she became a co-chair of Michelle Obama's nonpartisan organization When We All Vote, and in 2020 joined the Voto Latino Foundation's Impact Council as a co-chair.

Gomez has supported LGBTQ rights and racial justice initiatives. During her 2016 Revival Tour, she donated proceeds from a North Carolina concert to Equality North Carolina in opposition to the state's Public Facilities Privacy & Security Act. In 2017, she contributed a "love letter" to Billboard's "30 Days of Pride" initiative. In June 2020, she voiced support for the Black Lives Matter movement and temporarily gave control of her Instagram account to several Black activists, including Alicia Garza. She has also signed advocacy letters supporting the Equality Act and transgender rights.

Gomez has spoken out on political and humanitarian issues. During the 2014 Gaza War, she posted a message on social media asking for prayers for Gaza, and later clarified that she was "not picking any sides" but praying for "peace and humanity for all". In 2017, she opposed the rescission of the Deferred Action for Childhood Arrivals (DACA) program, participated in the 2018 March for Our Lives in support of gun reform, and voiced support for abortion rights following the 2019 Alabama abortion ban and the 2022 overturning of Roe v. Wade. In 2020, she urged Facebook executives Mark Zuckerberg and Sheryl Sandberg to address hate speech and misinformation on their platforms, reiterating her concerns following the January 6 US Capitol attack.

In May 2021, Gomez hosted Vax Live: The Concert to Reunite the World, organized by Global Citizen to promote equitable access to COVID-19 vaccines through the COVAX program. The campaign raised US$302 million and secured more than 26 million vaccine doses for global distribution. In October 2023, she was among more than 260 artists who signed an open letter organized by Artists4Ceasefire urging US leaders to call for an immediate ceasefire in the Gaza war. In January 2025, she posted and later deleted a video expressing distress over increased deportation efforts by US Immigration and Customs Enforcement (ICE) under the Trump administration; the post drew criticism from conservative commentators, and the White House subsequently shared a response video defending the administration's immigration policies.

== Business and ventures ==
=== Products and endorsements ===
In 2009, Gomez appeared in advertising campaigns for Sears and Borden Milk. The following year, she launched Dream Out Loud by Selena Gomez, a clothing line distributed through Kmart that featured bohemian-inspired apparel and incorporated recycled and eco-friendly materials. She later expanded into fragrances through a licensing agreement with Adrenalina. Her self-titled debut perfume was released in 2012, followed by the fragrance Vivamore and a nail polish collection with Nicole by OPI in 2013.

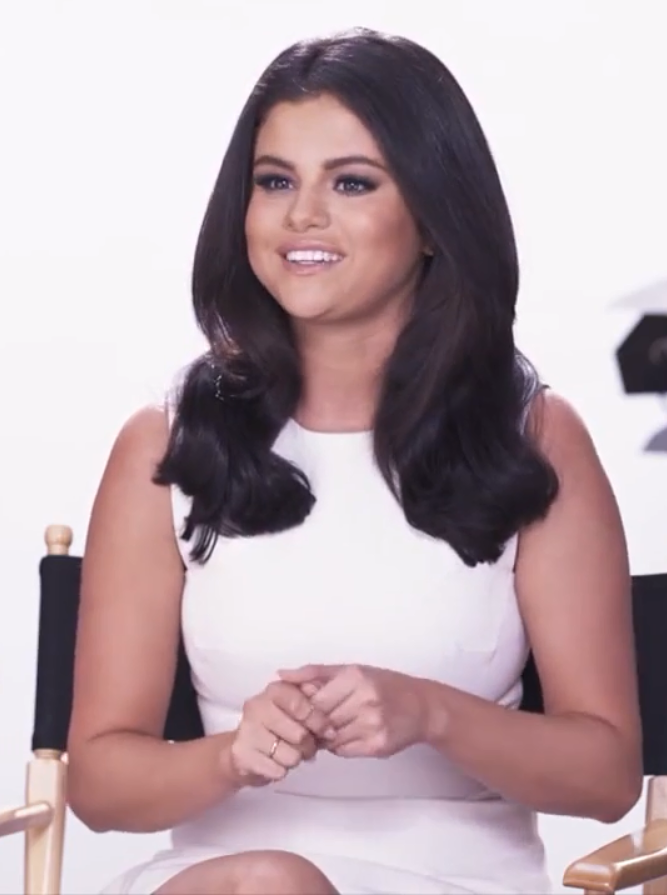
Gomez promoting the hair products brand Pantene in 2015

From 2013 to 2015, Gomez served as a representative and guest designer for the Adidas NEO label, appearing in advertising campaigns and collaborating on seasonal collections. In 2015, she became the face of Pantene's "Strong Is Beautiful" campaign. She subsequently appeared in campaigns for Louis Vuitton under creative director Nicolas Ghesquière, and participated in Coca-Cola's "Share a Coke and a Song" campaign, whose associated promotional Instagram post became the most-liked image on the platform at the time.

In December 2016, Gomez entered into a partnership with Coach, collaborating with creative director Stuart Vevers on design projects and appearing in advertising campaigns. The partnership produced several Coach x Selena Gomez collections, beginning with a handbag line in 2017 and later expanding into ready-to-wear apparel. In 2017, she became a brand ambassador and collaborator for Puma, contributing to footwear and apparel collections.

In 2020, Gomez became an investor and partner in Serendipity Brands, collaborating on a flavor released in conjunction with her single "Ice Cream" with Blackpink, and later became a co-owner of the company. In 2021, she released a capsule collection with swimwear brand La'Mariette and co-founded the mental health media platform Wondermind. Wondermind raised US$5 million in funding in 2022, valuing the pre-revenue startup at US$100 million, and Gomez was included in Inc.'s Female Founders 250 list in 2024. In August 2026, Gomez and her Wondermind co-founders were sued by investors who alleged fraud and misrepresentations concerning the company's operations and leadership. The plaintiffs voluntarily dismissed the lawsuit in its entirety with prejudice in November 2026. Her other business ventures include an investment in the food delivery company Gopuff, collaborations with cookware brand Our Place on collections released in 2022 and 2023, and a 2025 partnership with Mondelez International to release a limited-edition Oreo cookie inspired by horchata. A 2025 profile in Vogue Business described Gomez as having shifted from endorsement deals toward business development and ownership ventures.

=== Rare Beauty ===
In September 2020, Gomez launched the cosmetics brand Rare Beauty. The company promotes inclusivity and mental health awareness and offers cruelty-free and vegan products. Initially sold through its official website and Sephora stores in the US, the brand later expanded into Europe, the Middle East, and Southeast Asia. Rare Beauty was named Startup of the Year at the 2020 WWD Beauty Inc Awards, and Gomez received the Pete Born Impact Award in 2023. The company entered the fragrance market in 2025 with Rare Eau de Parfum and expanded to Ulta Beauty stores in the US in 2026.

As of May 2024, Rare Beauty was valued at US$2 billion. Its estimated annual revenue reached US$300 million in 2023, an increase of approximately 50 percent from 2022. The company was also included on Time's list of the most influential companies of 2024. In September 2024, Bloomberg L.P. reported that Gomez had become a billionaire with an estimated net worth of $1.3 billion, with roughly 81% derived from Rare Beauty. At age 32, she was described as "one of the country's youngest female self-made billionaires". In 2026, she was included on Forbes' Self-Made 250 list.

== Public image and impact ==
[Gomez] is not just a pop star, she's a multifaceted businesswoman with diverse income streams contributing to her impressive net worth ($1.3 billion).

— Stacy Jones, founder and chief executive officer of Hollywood Branded, on Gomez (2024)

Initially regarded as a teen idol, Gomez was later described as a pop icon and a "triple threat" entertainer. Early coverage emphasized her broad appeal among young audiences, and her presence across television, film, music, and social media. In 2011, Billboard described Gomez as the "Internet queen of Disney", while The Guardian dubbed her the "Tween Queen". Later coverage linked her public appeal to her relatability, perceived authenticity, and multifaceted career. Writing for Rolling Stone in 2022, Alex Morris noted that Gomez's openness about personal struggles had become central to her public image.

Writing in 2013, Hadley Freeman of The Guardian said that Gomez had navigated the transition beyond her Disney image more successfully than some of her peers, while noting that the association could still hinder efforts to be taken seriously. Gomez has since spoken about tabloid scrutiny, the loss of privacy, and feeling defined by her personal life rather than her work. In a 2017 interview with Billboard, she said that she had often felt defined "not by my work but by who I was". She has also discussed being sexualized at a young age and later feeling uncomfortable with attempts to project a more adult image.

Gomez has had a significant impact on popular culture. In 2016, David Amsden of W described Gomez as "the most popular girl in America", writing that she "embodies a particular strain of American fame: you know who she is without quite knowing who she is". Billboard ranked her at number 38 on its Top Artists of the 2010s decade chart, and Spotify ranked her as the eighth-most-streamed female artist of the 2010s. Her social-media reach has also drawn attention; Hugh McIntyre of Forbes noted Gomez's influence on social media, writing that posts mentioning her often attract unusually high engagement online. In 2016, she became the most followed person on Instagram, and the first person to reach 100 million followers on the platform, a milestone later recognized by Time in its Firsts series, "Women Who Are Changing the World". In 2023, she regained her status as the most-followed woman on the platform. The following year, the BBC reported that Gomez was the most-followed woman globally on social media. From 2022 to 2025, she was included in The Hollywood Reporter's annual Power 100 list of the most powerful women in entertainment.

Gomez's influence has also been cited by a number of artists and entertainers, including Hailee Steinfeld, Tate McRae, Millie Bobby Brown, Jenna Ortega, and Joey King. In 2015, Justin Bieber said that much of the inspiration for his album Purpose came from his relationship with Gomez. Britney Spears later cited Gomez's album Revival as an inspiration while working on her album Glory. Gomez's openness about health issues has also been praised by Lady Gaga and Miranda Hart, and Vanessa Hudgens said that Gomez inspired her involvement with UNICEF.

== Achievements ==
Gomez has won an Actor Award, an American Music Award, a Billboard Music Award, the Cannes Film Festival Award for Best Actress, and two MTV Video Music Awards. She holds the record for the most Kids' Choice Awards wins (13) for an individual, and has been recognized with 17 Guinness World Records. She has received five Golden Globe nominations for acting, as well as nominations for a BAFTA Award, three Critics' Choice Awards, three Grammy Awards, a Latin Grammy Award, and a Primetime Emmy Award for acting. As an executive producer of Only Murders in the Building, Gomez became the most-nominated Latina producer in Primetime Emmy Awards history after receiving five nominations for Outstanding Comedy Series, according to trade publications. She has also received three Daytime Emmy Award nominations, and was nominated for five Producers Guild of America Awards.

Gomez has achieved three consecutive number-one albums on the Billboard 200 and has topped the Billboard Hot 100 chart. Between 2011 and 2018, she recorded 15 consecutive top-forty entries on the Hot 100, the longest active run of any artist. According to the Recording Industry Association of America (RIAA), Gomez has accumulated 51.5 million certified units in the US, (Note: As of February 2025, Gomez's albums have garnered 3 million certified units. She has had a cumulative single certifications of 40.5 million digital downloads and on-demand streaming as a lead artist (including collaborations), and 8 million as a featured artist.) in addition to a further 22 million as part of Selena Gomez & the Scene. As of 2022, her recordings had amassed over 45 billion global streams. Billboard ranked her at number 30 on its 2025 list of the Top 100 Women Artists of the 21st Century.

Gomez has received several industry honors, including the Ultimate Choice Award at the 2014 Teen Choice Awards, Woman of the Year at the Billboard Women in Music event in 2017, and Latin Woman of the Year at the Billboard Latin Women in Music in 2025. She was named to Forbes 30 Under 30 in 2016, while Time included her on its annual list of the 100 most influential people in 2020. That year, she was also recognized as one of the Leading Ladies of Entertainment by the Latin Recording Academy and received the Arts Award from the Hispanic Heritage Foundation. In 2024, she was also appointed Chevalier de l'Ordre des Arts et des Lettres by the French Minister of Culture and received the Equity in Entertainment Award at The Hollywood Reporter's Women in Entertainment gala.

== Personal life ==
=== Beliefs ===
Gomez was raised Catholic. At age 13, she asked her father for a purity ring, which he had blessed at a church. She stopped wearing it in 2010, but later expressed respect for what it represented.

Gomez has spoken publicly about her Christian faith. In 2016, she performed her song “Nobody” at a Hillsong Young & Free concert in Los Angeles and later said that its lyrics referred to God. During her Revival Tour, she also performed Hillsong Worship's song "Transfiguration". In 2017, she expressed discomfort with the term "religion", emphasizing instead her faith and personal relationship with God. She was also seen attending Hillsong Church in Los Angeles on several occasions that year.

In 2021, Gomez described herself as spiritual rather than religious, said that she had been a Christian "for a while", and had read The Purpose Driven Life by evangelical Christian pastor Rick Warren three times.

=== Health ===
Gomez was diagnosed with a form of lupus erythematosus sometime between 2012 and early 2014. In September 2017, she revealed on Instagram that she had withdrawn from public events during the previous few months because she had received a kidney transplant from actress and friend Francia Raisa. During the transplant, one of her arteries ruptured, requiring emergency autotransplantation of a femoral vein to replace the artery.

Gomez has been open about her struggles with both anxiety and depression. She began psychotherapy in her early twenties and spent time in treatment facilities. When she reached 100 million Instagram followers, Gomez said she "sort of freaked out" and has since taken several extended breaks from social media, partly due to negative comments. In April 2020, she revealed she has bipolar disorder. In November 2022, she revealed that she had an episode of psychosis in 2018.

In October 2022, Gomez canceled an appearance on The Tonight Show Starring Jimmy Fallon after testing positive for COVID-19. In September 2024, Gomez revealed her inability to have children naturally due to her health issues, and mentioned wanting to explore either surrogacy or adoption in the future. In November 2024, she disclosed a prior diagnosis of small intestinal bacterial overgrowth.

=== Relationships ===
Gomez dated singer Nick Jonas in 2008. She briefly dated actor Taylor Lautner during 2009. She was in a highly publicized, on-again, off-again relationship with singer Justin Bieber between 2010 and 2018. During their periods apart, she dated DJ and producer Zedd in 2015 and singer-songwriter the Weeknd from January to October 2017. In a 2020 interview with NPR, Gomez mentioned experiencing emotional abuse during her relationship with Bieber.

She began dating record producer Benny Blanco in June 2023 and publicly confirmed their relationship that December. Gomez announced their engagement on December 11, 2024. They married on September 27, 2025, in Santa Barbara, California.

== Filmography ==
Films

- Another Cinderella Story (2008)
- Ramona and Beezus (2010)
- Monte Carlo (2011)
- Spring Breakers (2012)
- Hotel Transylvania film franchise (2012–2022)
- The Fundamentals of Caring (2016)
- The Dead Don't Die (2019)
- A Rainy Day in New York (2019)
- Selena Gomez: My Mind & Me (2022)
- Emilia Pérez (2024)

Television

- Barney & Friends (2002–2004)
- Wizards of Waverly Place (2007–2012)
- Selena + Chef (2020–2023)
- Only Murders in the Building (2021–present)

== Discography ==
Selena Gomez & the Scene studio albums

- Kiss & Tell (2009)
- A Year Without Rain (2010)
- When the Sun Goes Down (2011)

Solo studio albums

- Stars Dance (2013)
- Revival (2015)
- Rare (2020)

Collaborative studio albums

- I Said I Love You First (with Benny Blanco) (2025)

== Tours ==
Selena Gomez & the Scene tours

- Live in Concert (2009–2010)
- A Year Without Rain Tour (2010–2011)
- We Own the Night Tour (2011–2012)

Solo tours

- Stars Dance Tour (2013–2014)
- Revival Tour (2016)

== See also ==
- List of artists who reached number one in the United States
- List of artists who reached number one on the U.S. Pop Airplay chart
- List of most-followed Instagram accounts
- List of most-liked Instagram posts
- List of artists who reached number one on the U.S. Dance Club Songs chart
- List of Billboard Social 50 number-one artists
- History of Mexican Americans in Dallas–Fort Worth
