= De Una Vez =

2021 single by Selena Gomez

Promotional single by Selena Gomez

from the EP Revelación
- Language: Spanish
- Released: January 14, 2021
- Studio: Sacramento, California, United States
- Genre: Pop; alternative R&B
- Length: 2:35
- Label: SMG Music LLC; Interscope
- Songwriters: Selena Gomez; Abner Cordero Boria; Christopher Carballo Ramos; Marco Masís; Elena Rose; Alejandro Borrero; Ivanni Rodríguez; Ricardo López
- Producers: Albert Hype; Jota Rosa; Neon16; Tainy

Music video
- "De Una Vez" on YouTube

"De Una Vez" (English: "At Once") is a song recorded by American singer Selena Gomez. It was released on January 14, 2021, by Interscope Records, as the first single from her first Spanish extended play, Revelación (2021). Tapping into her Mexican heritage, "De Una Vez" marks Gomez's first Spanish single, with production from Tainy, Albert Hype, and Jota Rosa. It is a rhythmic pop and alternative R&B song with urban elements, discussing themes of love, self-worth, emotional growth, and empowerment.

Gomez described the song as a "beautiful love anthem". The official music video for "De Una Vez" was released to YouTube alongside the song. Heavily inspired by her Latin American culture, the mystical video adapts the art style of magic realism and depicts Gomez with a glowing milagro resembling the Sacred Heart, chronicling her personal evolution and healing. The video was met with critical acclaim and was nominated for the Latin Grammy Award for Best Short Form Music Video at the 22nd ceremony, marking Gomez's first nomination. "De Una Vez" reached top-ten in Costa Rica, Panama, Paraguay, Venezuela, US Hot Latin Songs, and the top-forty on the Billboard Global 200.

== Release and composition ==
"You know what's funny, is I actually think I sing better in Spanish. That was something I discovered. It was a lot of work, and look, you cannot mispronounce anything. It is something that needed to be precise, and needed to be respected by the audience I'm going to release this for. Of course I want everyone to enjoy the music, but I am targeting my fan base. I'm targeting my heritage, and I couldn't be more excited."

— Gomez on venturing into Spanish-language music

In December 2020, Gomez stated that she has "a whole little vessel of good things coming", and Billboard pointed out that this "could include a Spanish-language project". Various murals were spotted in Mexico, stating the song titles "De Una Vez" and "Baila Conmigo", generating speculating amidst fans and mainstream media that Gomez would be releasing Latin music soon.

On January 14, 2021, Gomez announced the release of "De Una Vez" slated for midnight. Later that day, she "quoted" a tweet dating from January 2011 that referenced a Spanish-language album that was never released, stating: "I think it will be worth the wait", which is exactly a decade since the tweet. "De Una Vez" acts as Gomez's first official Spanish-language single in over 10 years, and second overall after the Spanish version of "A Year Without Rain" (2010), titled "Un Año Sin Lluvia", by her former band Selena Gomez & the Scene. It is her first Spanish effort since "Taki Taki" (2018) with DJ Snake, Ozuna and Cardi B, and first solo foray since the track "Más" from her 2014 compilation album, For You. The song is two minutes and 36 seconds in length, and is the first promotional single from her first Spanish-language EP Revelación.

"De Una Vez" is a rhythmic pop and alternative R&B song inspired by Empress Of. It also has minimal urban elements. It discusses Gomez's personal healing, love, empowerment, forgiveness, and having the strength to move forward, away from the past. It was produced by Tainy, Albert Hype, and Jota Rosa.

== Music video ==
The official music video for "De Una Vez", was recorded and shot in September 2020 and directed by Los Pérez, produced by Caviar LA and post produced by Eighty4, premiered on January 14, 2021, alongside the release of the song. It received critical acclaim for its visuals and symbolisms, and was nominated for Best Short Form Music Video at the 22nd Annual Latin Grammy Awards, and winning Favorite Music Video at the 2021 Latin American Music Awards.

=== Synopsis ===
A still from the music video, in which Gomez wakes up from a bed, surrounded by flora.

In the video, Gomez traverses through many rooms in a mystical house, depicting her creative and personal growth using metaphors that reflect on her evolution. She moves from a bedroom decorated with fertile plants and dreams, to a room luminated with lamps, then a kitchen, and a room with levitating vinyl discs and music instruments. Throughout the video, Gomez wears a glowing crystal heart on her chest (an object similar to Sacred Heart), representing her resilience, while she sings the song's lyrics that center on love and healing. The video ends with the words "Baila Conmigo..." (transl. "Dance with Me..."), which has been noted to be a clue to a follow-up song or album.

=== Direction and production ===
As "De Una Vez" steers Gomez into a new phase in her music career, she wanted the song's visuals to have an impact on viewers, handled by directors that can deeply connect to the material. She stated: "If I was going to completely immerse myself into a project inspired by Latin culture, I wanted to work with native Spanish-speaking creators". Due to the COVID-19 pandemic and accompanying travel restrictions, the video was shot remotely. The directors were unable to fly to Los Angeles to shoot the video, and were linked to the shooting spot via laptop instead. The entire video was filmed at night, in a single shot with hidden cuts.

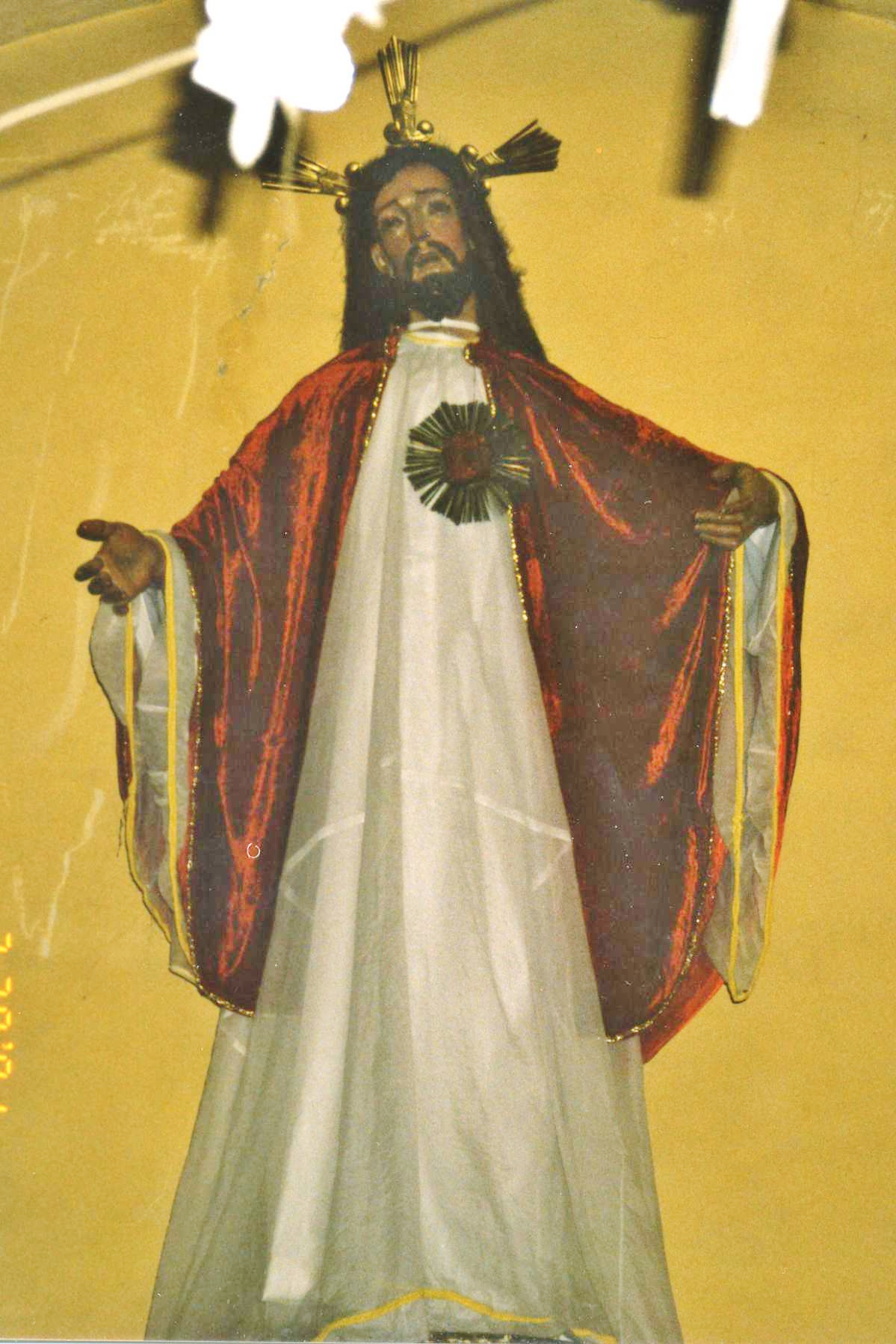
The music video and cover artwork for "De Una Vez" depicts Gomez with a Sacred Heart on her chest, a popular religious motif in Mexican culture and art.

Gomez collaborated with Los Pérez, a duo consisting of Mexican director Tania Verduzco and Spanish director Adrián Pérez—a married couple who have worked on commercial advertisements such as for Pepsi and Candy Crush Saga. Wanting to create an emotional journey with the video, Verduzco explained that they "thought that the song had a sincere and personal message, more of the woman than the artist. We had to bring that to light [because] it's a song about a mature woman healing a wound, leaving the past behind, and entering into a new chapter". To channel this idea, Gomez and Los Pérez looked at popular Latin American writers Isabel Allende, Gabriel García Márquez, and Laura Esquivel, whose literary works delved into supernatural concepts of magical realism, an art genre that blends real-world problems with elements of fantasy. Gomez also infused Mexican cultural references into the video, such as the Sacred Heart, a symbol tightly related to Mexican folk art. The team designed the heart based on a Milagro, a Christian folk charm, to symbolize the video's themes of healing.

Gomez's fashion choice for the video follows a "botanical motif", which represents emotional growth. Styled by Shirley Kurata, Gomez wears a soft-pink floral Rodarte dress, with a V-neck, puffed sleeves, and pink, white and yellow daisy prints. The crystal heart is pinned to the centre of the dress. Her wavy hair is adorned with Frida Kahlo-inspired flower accessories made from silk, paired with feathered opal earrings from Mexican designer Daniela Villegas. Gomez's makeup was kept soft, romantic and feminine, using her own Rare Beauty line, in collaboration with longtime makeup artist Melissa Murdick. Murdick was inspired by the runway images from Dolce & Gabbana spring 2014 and Alexander McQueen's spring 2016 fashion shows for Gomez's look.

== Accolades ==
Awards and nominations for "De Una Vez"
Year	Organization	Award	Result	Ref(s)
2021	Latin American Music Awards	Favorite Video	Won	
2021	Latin Grammy Awards	Best Short Form Music Video	Nominated	
2021	Berlin Music Video Awards	Best Visual Effects	Runner-up	

== Credits and personnel ==
Credits adapted from YouTube.

=== Musicians ===
- Selena Gomez – vocals, songwriting
- Tainy – songwriting, production, programming
- Jota Rosa – production, programming
- Albert Hype – production, programming
- Neon16 – production
- Abner Cordero Boria – songwriting
- Christopher Carballo Ramos – songwriting
- Andrea Mangiamarchi – songwriting
- Alejandro Borrero – songwriting
- Ivanni Rodríguez – songwriting
- Ricardo López Lalinde – songwriting

=== Technical ===
- Serban Ghenea – mixing, studio personnel
- John Hanes – mix engineering, studio personnel
- John Janick – A&R, studio personnel, production coordinating
- Sam Riback – A&R, studio personnel, production coordinating
- Vanessa Angiuli – A&R, studio personnel, production coordinating
- Lex Borrero – A&R, studio personnel, production coordinating
- Ivanni Rodríguez – A&R, studio personnel, production coordinating
- Aleen Keshishian – studio personnel, production coordinating
- Zack Morgenroth – studio personnel, production coordinating
- Bart Schoudel - vocal production, engineering, studio personnel
- Chris Gehringer – master engineering, studio personnel
- Angelo Carretta – engineering, studio personnel

== Charts ==
Chart performance for "De Una Vez"
Chart (2021)	Peak position
Argentina Hot 100 (Billboard)	91
Canada Hot 100 (Billboard)	91
Costa Rica Anglo (Monitor Latino)	8
Ecuador Anglo (Monitor Latino)	14
Global 200 (Billboard)	40
Global Excl. US (Billboard)	36
Guatemala Anglo (Monitor Latino)	11
Hungary (Single Top 40)	39
Ireland (IRMA)	100
Mexico (Mexico Español Airplay)	23
New Zealand Hot Singles (RMNZ)	16
Panama Anglo (Monitor Latino)	4
Paraguay Anglo (Monitor Latino)	10
Portugal (AFP)	67
Spain (Promusicae)	62
UK Singles Downloads (Official Charts)	63
Uruguay Anglo (Monitor Latino)	14
US Billboard Hot 100	92
US Hot Latin Songs (Billboard)	4
Venezuela Anglo (Monitor Latino)	9

== Release history ==
Release history for "De Una Vez"
Region	Date	Format	Label(s)	Ref.
Various	January 14, 2021	Digital download; streaming	Interscope	
