= Selena Gomez discography =

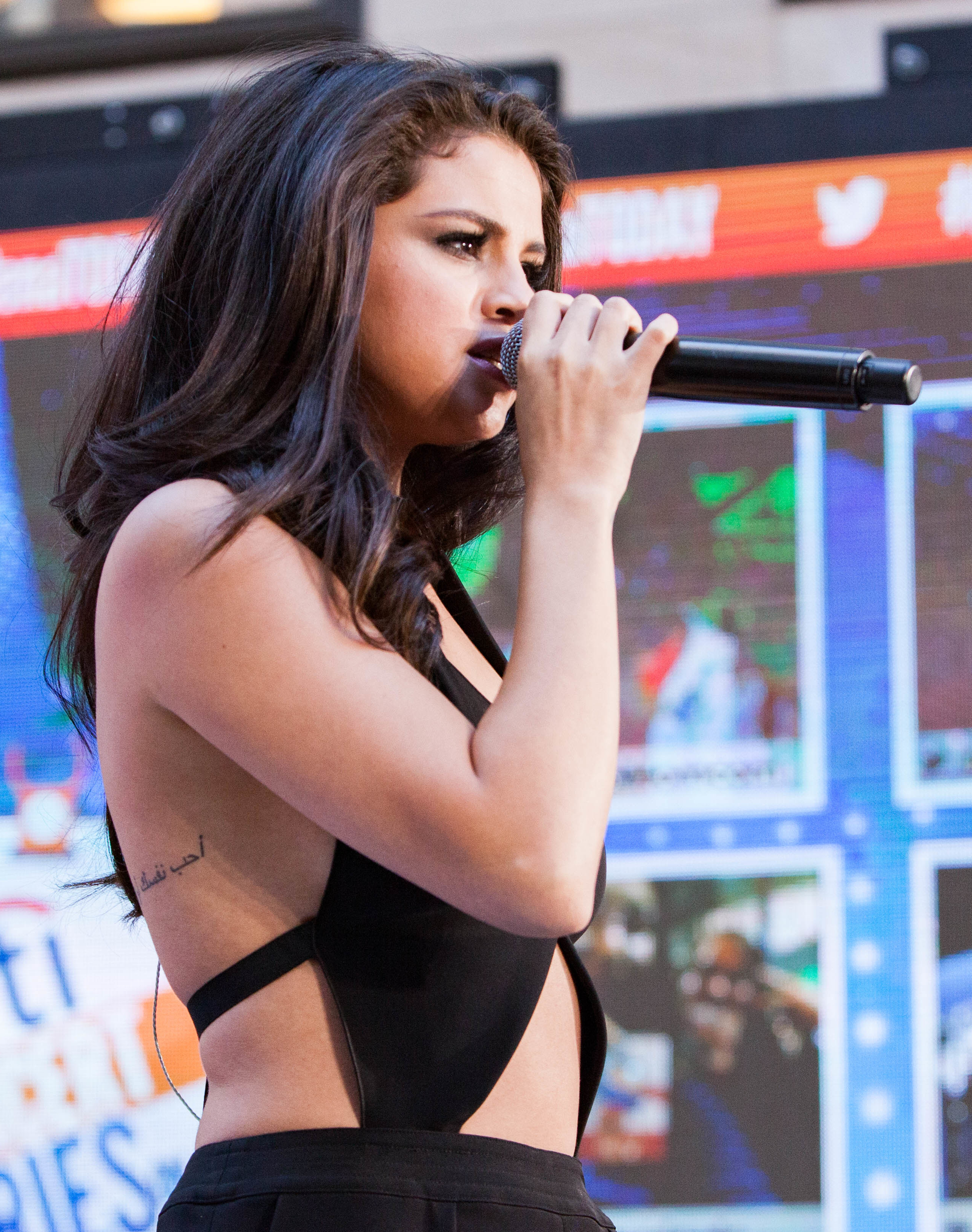
- Gomez performing in 2015
- Studio albums: 3
- Extended plays: 4
- Compilation albums: 3
- Singles: 37
- Collaborative albums: 1
- Promotional singles: 9
- Charity singles: 2

American singer Selena Gomez has released three solo studio albums, one collaborative studio album, three compilation albums, four extended plays (EPs), 37 singles (including five as a featured artist), nine promotional singles, and two charity singles. Gomez's first solo studio album, Stars Dance (2013), debuted at number one in both the United States and Canada. Its lead single, "Come & Get It", became a top-ten hit in the US, Canada, and the United Kingdom. Having spent seven years with Hollywood Records—including her time with her former band Selena Gomez & the Scene—the singer signed a recording contract with Interscope Records in 2014. To officially end her contract with Hollywood Records, she released the compilation album For You (2014), which featured the US and Canada top-ten single "The Heart Wants What It Wants".

The singer's second studio album, Revival (2015), debuted atop the US Billboard 200, and charted within the top ten of many territories. It spawned three top-ten hits in the US—"Good for You", "Same Old Love", and "Hands to Myself"—all of which topped the Pop Airplay chart, making Gomez the sixth woman to score at least three number-one singles on that chart from a single set. Between 2016 and 2019, Gomez released a series of successful standalone singles and collaborations, notably featured on Charlie Puth's global hit "We Don't Talk Anymore", which topped the charts in Italy and reached the top ten in the US, Australia, and France. She later collaborated with Kygo on "It Ain't Me", and with DJ Snake on "Taki Taki", both songs reached the top ten of most major music charts worldwide. Additional releases like "Wolves" and "Back to You" were also top-ten hits globally. From 2011 to 2018, Gomez achieved a streak of 16 consecutive top 40 hits on the Billboard Hot 100, which is the "longest active run of any artist".

Gomez's third studio album, Rare (2020), became her third consecutive number one in the US, and topped the charts in Australia, Canada, and several other territories, while peaking at number two in the UK. Its lead single, "Lose You to Love Me", achieved global success, becoming her first number-one single in the US, Canada, and Ireland, and reached the top five of various national charts worldwide. The following year, Gomez released her first Spanish-language project, an EP titled Revelación, which debuted at number one on the US Billboard Top Latin Albums chart, becoming the biggest week for a Latin album by a woman since 2017. The EP and its single "Baila Conmigo" made her the first female artist in over a decade to simultaneously lead both the US Latin Albums and US Latin Airplay charts. In 2022, Gomez collaborated with Rema on the remix of "Calm Down", which is widely regarded as the most successful Afrobeats song of all time, and became the second best-selling song of 2023 globally. The song peaked at number three on both the Billboard Global 200 and the US Billboard Hot 100, and topped the Canadian and Radio Songs charts. It also became the longest-charting song on the Pop Airplay chart. Gomez and Benny Blanco released the collaborative album I Said I Love You First (2025), which debuted in the top ten in several countries, including number two in the US, where it achieved Gomez's highest first-week sales to date.

As of August 2023, Gomez has sold 3.6 million albums in the United States, and shifted more than 11.5 million album-equivalent units, including releases with her former band. As of May 2017, she has sold 24.3 million songs in the US. According to the Recording Industry Association of America (RIAA), she has achieved 51.5 million certified units in the US, (Note: As of February 2025, Gomez's albums have garnered 3 million certified units. She has had a cumulative single certifications of 40.5 million digital downloads and on-demand streaming as a lead artist (including collaborations), and 8 million as a featured artist.) in addition to a further 22 million as part of Selena Gomez & the Scene. She has a total of 46 chart entries on the US Billboard Hot 100, including a number one hit and nine top ten songs. (Note: Including releases with the Scene.)

== Albums ==
=== Solo studio albums ===
List of studio albums, with selected chart positions, sales figures and certifications
Title	Album details	Peak chart positions										Sales (Note: Pure sales and not equivalent units (streaming and song downloads).)	Certifications
Title	Album details	US	AUS	CAN	DEN	FRA	GER	NOR	NZ	SWI	UK	Sales	Certifications
Stars Dance	Released: July 19, 2013; Label: Hollywood; Formats: CD, LP, digital download, streaming	1	8	1	2	12	4	1	5	6	14	US: 412,000 (Note: United States sales figures for Stars Dance as of July 2021.); CAN: 16,500 (Note: Canada first week sales figures for Stars Dance.); FRA: 30,000 (Note: France sales figures for "Stars Dance" as of October 2015.)	RIAA: Gold; MC: Gold; RMNZ: Gold
Revival	Released: October 9, 2015; Label: Interscope; Formats: CD, LP, digital download, streaming	1	3	2	6	8	12	2	2	10	11	US: 441,000 (Note: United States sales figures for Revival as of July 2021.); CAN: 29,385 (Note: Canada sales figures for Revival from January 2016 to December 2016, including its first week on the Billboard Canadian Albums Chart.); FRA: ~15,000 (Note: France sales figures for "Revival" as of April 2016.)	RIAA: Platinum; ARIA: Platinum; BPI: Gold; IFPI DEN: 2× Platinum; IFPI NOR: 3× Platinum; MC: Gold; RMNZ: 2× Platinum
Rare	Released: January 10, 2020; Label: Interscope; Formats: CD, LP, digital download, cassette, streaming	1	1	1	5	6	3	1	2	3	2	US: 123,000 (Note: United States sales figures for Rare as of July 2021.); FRA: 4,000 (Note: France sales figures for Rare as of February 2020.); UK: 5,122 (Note: United Kingdom sales figures for Rare in 2020 (cassette only).)	RIAA: Platinum; BPI: Gold; IFPI DEN: Platinum; IFPI NOR: Platinum; RMNZ: Platinum; SNEP: Platinum

=== Collaborative studio albums ===
List of collaborative studio albums, with selected chart positions and sales figures
Title	Album details	Peak chart positions										Sales
Title	Album details	US	AUS	CAN	FRA	GER	IRE	NOR	NZ	SWI	UK	Sales
I Said I Love You First (with Benny Blanco)	Released: March 21, 2025; Label: SMG Music LLC, Friends Keep Secrets, Interscope; Formats: CD, LP, digital download, streaming	2	5	6	12	2	4	10	6	6	4	US: 78,000 (Note: United States first week (71,000) and second week (7,000) sales figures for I Said I Love You First.)

=== Compilation albums ===
List of compilation albums, with selected chart positions and sales figures
Title	Album details	Peak chart positions										Sales	Certifications
Title	Album details	US	AUT	BEL (FL)	BEL (WA)	FRA	IRE	ITA	NOR	SPA	UK	Sales	Certifications
For You	Released: November 24, 2014; Label: Hollywood; Formats: CD, digital download, streaming	24	73	40	67	80	95	34	37	40	64	US: 119,000 (Note: United States sales figures for For You as of July 2021.)	RIAA: Gold; BPI: Gold
Selena x Votes (Note: The streaming-exclusive compilation Selena x Votes was released in 2020 as a voting playlist to encourage voter participation ahead of the 2020 U.S. presidential election and features six previously released tracks.)	Released: October 30, 2020; Label: Universal; Format: Streaming	—	—	—	—	—	—	—	—	—	—		
Love You like a Love Song, and More (Note: The streaming-exclusive compilation Love You Like a Love Song, and More features a selection of previously released tracks.)	Released: August 20, 2021; Label: Universal; Format: Streaming	—	—	—	—	—	—	—	—	—	—		
"—" denotes a recording that did not chart or was not released in that territory.

== Extended plays ==
List of extended plays, with selected chart positions and sales figures
Title	EP details	Peak chart positions										Sales
Title	EP details	US	AUT	CAN	FRA	GER	ITA	NLD	SPA	SWI	UK	Sales
Another Cinderella Story EP – Featuring Selena Gomez	Released: June 16, 2009; Label: Razor & Tie; Format: Digital download	—	—	—	—	—	—	—	—	—	—	
For You EP	Released: March 31, 2015; Label: Hollywood; Format: Digital download, streaming	—	—	—	—	—	—	—	—	—	—	
Revelación	Released: March 12, 2021; Label: SMG Music LLC, Interscope; Formats: CD, LP, digital download, cassette, streaming	22	33	38	36	39	33	52	4	19	28	US: 24,000 (Note: United States sales figures for Revelación as of July 2021.)
Droplets	Released: April 18, 2026 (Note: It was released as a Record Store Day exclusive.); Label: SMG Music LLC, Interscope; Formats: LP	—	—	—	—	—	—	—	—	—	—	
"—" denotes a recording that did not chart or was not released in that territory.

== Singles ==
=== As lead artist ===
==== 2000s and 2010s ====
List of singles released in the 2000s and 2010s as lead artist, showing selected chart positions, certifications, and associated albums
Title	Year	Peak chart positions										Certifications	Album
Title	Year	US	AUS	CAN	DEN	GER	IRE	NOR	NZ	SWE	UK	Certifications	Album
"Tell Me Something I Don't Know"	2008	58	— (Note: "Tell Me Something I Don't Know" did not enter the ARIA Singles Chart, but peaked at number 13 on the ARIA Hitseekers Singles Chart.)	—	—	—	—	—	—	—	— (Note: "Tell Me Something I Don't Know" did not enter the UK Singles Chart, but peaked at number 13 on the UK Independent Singles Breakers Chart.)		Another Cinderella Story
"Come & Get It"	2013	6	46	6	34	58	6	16	14	—	8	RIAA: 5× Platinum; ARIA: 2× Platinum; BPI: Gold; GLF: Gold; IFPI DEN: Gold; IFPI NOR: Platinum; MC: 2× Platinum; RMNZ: Platinum	Stars Dance
"Slow Down"	2013	27	93	29	—	—	98	—	—	—	106	RIAA: 2× Platinum; ARIA: Gold	Stars Dance
"The Heart Wants What It Wants"	2014	6	33	6	9	53	60	13	19	53	30	RIAA: 4× Platinum; ARIA: Platinum; BPI: Silver; GLF: Gold; IFPI DEN: Platinum; IFPI NOR: 4× Platinum; MC: Platinum; RMNZ: Platinum	For You
"Good for You" (featuring ASAP Rocky)	2015	5	10	8	11	29	23	9	14	24	23	RIAA: 3× Platinum; ARIA: 5× Platinum; BPI: Platinum; BVMI: Gold; GLF: 2× Platinum; IFPI DEN: 2× Platinum; IFPI NOR: 3× Platinum; MC: 2× Platinum; RMNZ: 2× Platinum	Revival
"Same Old Love"	2015	5	33	6	23	56	72	37	— (Note: "Same Old Love" did not enter the NZ Top 40 Singles Chart, but peaked at number 2 on the NZ Heatseekers chart.)	37	81	RIAA: 3× Platinum; ARIA: 2× Platinum; BPI: Gold; BVMI: Gold; GLF: Platinum; IFPI DEN: Platinum; IFPI NOR: 2× Platinum; MC: 2× Platinum; RMNZ: Platinum	Revival
"Hands to Myself"	2016	7	13	5	22	52	24	18	5	20	14	RIAA: 2× Platinum; ARIA: 4× Platinum; BPI: Platinum; BVMI: Gold; GLF: 2× Platinum; IFPI DEN: Platinum; IFPI NOR: 2× Platinum; MC: Platinum; RMNZ: 2× Platinum	Revival
"Kill Em with Kindness"	2016	39	33	14	30	39	24	33	28	34	35	RIAA: Platinum; ARIA: 2× Platinum; BPI: Gold; BVMI: Gold; GLF: Platinum; IFPI DEN: Gold; IFPI NOR: Platinum; RMNZ: Platinum	Revival
"It Ain't Me" (with Kygo)	2017	10	4	2	2	2	2	1	3	2	7	RIAA: 3× Platinum; ARIA: 5× Platinum; BPI: 2× Platinum; BVMI: 2× Platinum; GLF: 7× Platinum; IFPI DEN: 3× Platinum; IFPI NOR: 7× Platinum; MC: 9× Platinum; RMNZ: 4× Platinum	Stargazing
"Bad Liar"	2017	20	13	11	38	36	23	28	17	23	21	RIAA: Platinum; ARIA: 3× Platinum; BPI: Gold; GLF: Gold; IFPI DEN: Gold; IFPI NOR: Platinum; MC: 3× Platinum; RMNZ: Platinum	Non-album singles (Note: "Bad Liar", "Fetish", and "Wolves" were originally released as standalone singles but were later included on the Target edition and the special international CD edition of Rare, as well as the Record Store Day-exclusive EP Droplets.)
"Fetish" (featuring Gucci Mane)	2017	27	23	10	22	36	29	29	16	24	33	RIAA: Platinum; ARIA: 2× Platinum; BPI: Silver; GLF: Gold; IFPI DEN: Gold; IFPI NOR: Platinum; MC: 2× Platinum; RMNZ: Platinum	Non-album singles
"Wolves" (with Marshmello)	2017	20	5	7	8	11	5	5	10	7	9	RIAA: 4× Platinum; ARIA: 7× Platinum; BPI: Platinum; BVMI: Platinum; GLF: 2× Platinum; IFPI DEN: Platinum; IFPI NOR: 3× Platinum; MC: 6× Platinum; RMNZ: 3× Platinum	Non-album singles
"Back to You"	2018	18	4	4	12	19	4	10	8	14	13	RIAA: 2× Platinum; ARIA: 5× Platinum; BPI: Platinum; BVMI: Gold; GLF: Platinum; IFPI DEN: Platinum; IFPI NOR: 3× Platinum; RMNZ: 3× Platinum	13 Reasons Why: Season 2
"I Can't Get Enough" (with Benny Blanco, Tainy and J Balvin)	2019	66	43	33	—	53	20	—	— (Note: "I Can't Get Enough" did not enter the NZ Top 40 Singles Chart, but peaked at number 4 on the NZ Hot Singles Chart.)	53	42	RIAA: Gold; MC: 2× Platinum; RMNZ: Gold	I Said I Love You First (Note: "I Can't Get Enough" was first released as a standalone single before being included on Gomez and Benny Blanco's collaborative studio album I Said I Love You First.)
"Lose You to Love Me"	2019	1	2	1	8	7	1	2	2	6	3	RIAA: 3× Platinum; ARIA: 5× Platinum; BPI: 2× Platinum; BVMI: Gold; GLF: Platinum; IFPI DEN: Platinum; IFPI NOR: 2× Platinum; MC: 5× Platinum; RMNZ: 3× Platinum	Rare
"—" denotes a recording that did not chart or was not released in that territory.

==== 2020s ====
List of singles released in the 2020s as lead artist, showing selected chart positions, certifications, and associated albums
Title	Year	Peak chart positions										Certifications	Album
Title	Year	US	AUS	CAN	FRA	GER	IRE	NZ	SWI	UK	WW	Certifications	Album
"Rare"	2020	30	22	21	73	42	17	28	28	28	—	RIAA: Platinum; ARIA: Platinum; BPI: Silver; MC: Platinum; RMNZ: Gold	Rare
"Boyfriend"	2020	59	54	66	159	86	35	— (Note: "Boyfriend" did not enter the NZ Top 40 Singles Chart, but peaked at number 1 on the NZ Hot Singles Chart.)	63	55	—		Rare (Deluxe)
"Past Life" (Remix) (with Trevor Daniel)	2020	77	— (Note: "Past Life" did not enter the ARIA Singles Chart, but peaked at number 38 on the ARIA Digital Track Chart.)	68	—	—	—	— (Note: "Past Life" did not enter the NZ Top 40 Singles Chart, but peaked at number 5 on the NZ Hot Singles Chart.)	—	—	—	RIAA: Gold; MC: Platinum	Non-album single
"Ice Cream" (with Blackpink)	2020	13	16	11	135	78	33	18	45	39	8	ARIA: Platinum; BPI: Silver; MC: Platinum; RMNZ: Gold	The Album
"Baila Conmigo" (with Rauw Alejandro)	2021	74	—	68	187	86	62	— (Note: "Baila Conmigo" did not enter the NZ Top 40 Singles Chart, but peaked at number 4 on the NZ Hot Singles Chart.)	28	—	22		Revelación
"Selfish Love" (with DJ Snake)	2021	— (Note: "Selfish Love" did not enter the US Billboard Hot 100, but peaked at number 5 on the US Bubbling Under Hot 100 chart.)	—	71	54	—	61	— (Note: "Selfish Love" did not enter the NZ Top 40 Singles Chart, but peaked at number 14 on the NZ Hot Singles Chart.)	76	93	72	SNEP: Platinum	Revelación
"999" (with Camilo)	2021	— (Note: "999" did not enter the US Billboard Hot 100, but peaked at number 25 on the US Hot Latin Songs chart.)	—	—	—	—	—	—	—	—	— (Note: "999" did not enter the Billboard Global 200 chart, but peaked at number 196 on the Global Excl. US chart.)		Non-album single
"Let Somebody Go" (with Coldplay)	2022	91	66	45	115	74	25	— (Note: "Let Somebody Go" did not enter the NZ Top 40 Singles Chart, but peaked at number 4 on the NZ Hot Singles Chart.)	27	24	32	BPI: Silver; RMNZ: Gold; SNEP: Gold	Music of the Spheres
"Calm Down" (Remix) (with Rema)	2022	3	11	1	—	—	—	7	—	—	3	ARIA: 8× Platinum; MC: Diamond; RMNZ: 2× Platinum	Rave & Roses Ultra
"My Mind & Me"	2022	83	98	63	—	—	50	— (Note: "My Mind & Me" did not enter the NZ Top 40 Singles Chart, but peaked at number 13 on the NZ Hot Singles Chart.)	61	78	80		Non-album singles
"Single Soon"	2023	19	26	17	66	68	19	35	47	21	13	ARIA: Platinum; MC: Gold	Non-album singles
"Love On"	2024	56	83	56	—	—	73	— (Note: "Love On" did not enter the NZ Top 40 Singles Chart, but peaked at number 7 on the NZ Hot Singles Chart.)	—	61	67		Non-album singles
"Call Me When You Break Up" (with Benny Blanco and Gracie Abrams)	2025	46	82	41	—	61	37	— (Note: "Call Me When You Break Up" did not enter the NZ Top 40 Singles Chart, but peaked at number 6 on the NZ Hot Singles Chart.)	—	28	54	BPI: Silver; MC: Gold	I Said I Love You First
"Sunset Blvd" (with Benny Blanco)	2025	97	—	79	—	—	—	— (Note: "Sunset Blvd" did not enter the NZ Top 40 Singles Chart, but peaked at number 15 on the NZ Hot Singles Chart.)	—	100	123		I Said I Love You First
"Ojos Tristes" (with Benny Blanco and The Marías)	2025	56	—	83	—	—	—	— (Note: "Ojos Tristes" did not enter the NZ Top 40 Singles Chart, but peaked at number 12 on the NZ Hot Singles Chart.)	—	—	51		I Said I Love You First
"In the Dark"	2025	—	—	—	—	—	—	— (Note: "In the Dark" did not enter the NZ Top 40 Singles Chart, but peaked at number 36 on the NZ Hot Singles Chart.)	—	—	—		Nobody Wants This
"Te Olvido (La La)" (with Benny Blanco and Becky G)	2026	— (Note: "Te Olvido (La La)" did not enter the US Billboard Hot 100, but peaked at number 14 on the US Hot Latin Songs chart.)	—	—	—	—	—	—	—	—	—		Hermoso
"—" denotes a recording that did not chart or was not released in that territory.

=== As featured artist ===
List of singles as featured artist, with selected chart positions and certifications, showing year released and album name
Title	Year	Peak chart positions										Certifications	Album
Title	Year	US	AUS	CAN	DEN	FRA	GER	ITA	NZ	SWI	UK	Certifications	Album
"I Want You to Know" (Zedd featuring Selena Gomez)	2015	17	22	19	25	61	39	49	—	48	14	RIAA: 2× Platinum; ARIA: 2× Platinum; BPI: Silver; BVMI: Gold; FIMI: Gold; IFPI DEN: Gold; RMNZ: Gold	True Colors
"We Don't Talk Anymore" (Charlie Puth featuring Selena Gomez)	2016	9	10	11	13	8	52	1	8	16	14	RIAA: 5× Platinum; ARIA: 6× Platinum; BPI: 2× Platinum; BVMI: Gold; FIMI: 5× Platinum; IFPI DEN: 2× Platinum; IFPI SWI: Gold; MC: Diamond; RMNZ: 5× Platinum; SNEP: Diamond	Nine Track Mind
"Trust Nobody" (Cashmere Cat featuring Selena Gomez and Tory Lanez)	2016	— (Note: "Trust Nobody" did not enter the US Billboard Hot 100, but peaked at number 6 on the US Bubbling Under Hot 100 chart.)	46	61	—	174	—	92	—	—	92	RIAA: Gold; RMNZ: Gold	9
"Taki Taki" (DJ Snake featuring Selena Gomez, Ozuna and Cardi B)	2018	11	24	7	8	2	8	2	12	3	15	RIAA: 4× Platinum; ARIA: 3× Platinum; BPI: Platinum; BVMI: Platinum; FIMI: 2× Platinum; IFPI DEN: Platinum; MC: 6× Platinum; RMNZ: 2× Platinum; SNEP: Diamond	Carte Blanche
"Anxiety" (Julia Michaels featuring Selena Gomez)	2019	— (Note: "Anxiety" did not enter the US Billboard Hot 100, but peaked at number 28 on the Digital Song Sales chart.)	67	69	—	— (Note: "Anxiety" did not enter the French Singles Chart, but peaked at number 84 on the French Singles Downloads Chart.)	—	—	— (Note: "Anxiety did not enter the NZ Top 40 Singles Chart, but peaked at number 8 on the NZ Hot Singles Chart.)	—	— (Note: "Anxiety" did not enter the UK Singles Chart, but peaked at number 19 on the UK Video Streaming Chart.)	MC: Gold	Inner Monologue Part 1
"—" denotes a recording that did not chart or was not released in that territory.

=== Promotional singles ===
List of promotional singles, with selected chart positions, showing year released and album name
Title	Year	Peak chart positions										Certifications	Album
Title	Year	US	AUS	CAN	FRA	GER	IRE	NOR	NZ	SWI	UK	Certifications	Album
"Whoa Oh! (Me vs. Everyone)" (Remix) (Forever the Sickest Kids featuring Selena Gomez)	2009	—	—	—	—	—	—	—	—	—	—		Non-album promotional single
"Magic"	2009	61	—	80	—	—	—	5	—	—	90	RIAA: Gold	Wizards of Waverly Place
"Shake It Up"	2011	— (Note: "Shake It Up" did not enter the Billboard Hot 100, but peaked at number nine on the US Bubbling Under Hot 100 Singles chart.)	—	—	—	—	—	—	—	—	—	RIAA: Gold	Shake It Up: Break It Down
"Me & the Rhythm"	2015	— (Note: "Me & the Rhythm" did not enter the Billboard Hot 100, but peaked at number 6 on the US Bubbling Under Hot 100 Singles chart.)	—	57	143	—	—	—	—	—	—		Revival
"Look at Her Now"	2019	27	29	13	113	43	15	15	23	20	26	ARIA: Platinum; BPI: Silver; IFPI NOR: Gold; RMNZ: Gold	Rare
"Feel Me"	2020	98	58	56	175	63	42	32	— (Note: "Feel Me" did not enter the NZ Top 40 Singles Chart, but peaked at number 2 on the NZ Hot Singles Chart.)	39	89	ARIA: Gold; IFPI NOR: Gold	Rare (Deluxe)
"De Una Vez"	2021	92	—	91	—	—	100	—	— (Note: "De Una Vez" did not enter the NZ Top 40 Singles Chart, but peaked at number 16 on the NZ Hot Singles Chart.)	—	— (Note: "De Una Vez" did not enter the UK singles chart, but peaked at number 66 on the UK Singles Sales Chart.)		Revelación
"Scared of Loving You" (with Benny Blanco)	2025	— (Note: "Scared of Loving You" did not enter the Billboard Hot 100, but peaked at number 12 on the US Bubbling Under Hot 100 Singles chart.)	—	97	—	—	—	—	— (Note: "Scared of Loving You" did not enter the NZ Top 40 Singles Chart, but peaked at number 14 on the NZ Hot Singles Chart.)	—	—		I Said I Love You First
"Younger and Hotter Than Me" (with Benny Blanco)	2025	— (Note: "Younger and Hotter Than Me" did not enter the Billboard Hot 100, but peaked at number 2 on the US Bubbling Under Hot 100 Singles chart.)	—	85	—	—	—	—	— (Note: "Younger and Hotter Than Me" did not enter the NZ Top 40 Singles Chart, but peaked at number 11 on the NZ Hot Singles Chart.)	—	— (Note: "Younger and Hotter Than Me" did not enter the UK Singles Chart, but peaked at number 4 on the UK Physical Singles Chart.)		I Said I Love You First
"—" denotes a recording that did not chart or was not released in that territory.

=== Charity singles ===
List of charity singles, with selected chart positions, showing year released
Title	Year	Peak chart positions
Title	Year	US
"Send It On" (with Miley Cyrus, Jonas Brothers and Demi Lovato)	2009	20
"Hands" (among various artists)	2016	—
"—" denotes a recording that did not chart or was not released in that territory.

== Other charted and certified songs ==
List of songs, with selected chart positions, showing year released and album name
Title	Year	Peak chart positions										Certifications	Album
Title	Year	US	US Latin	AUS	CAN	FRA	IRE	NZ Hot	POR	UK	WW	Certifications	Album
"Cruella de Vil"	2008	— (Note: "Cruella de Vil" did not enter the Billboard Hot 100, but peaked at number 100 on the US Pop 100 chart.)	—	—	—	—	—	—	—	—	—		Disneymania 6
"New Classic" (with Drew Seeley)	2009	— (Note: "New Classic" did not enter the Billboard Hot 100, but peaked at number 14 on the US Bubbling Under Hot 100 Singles chart.)	—	—	—	—	—	—	—	—	—		Another Cinderella Story
"One and the Same" (with Demi Lovato)	2009	82	—	—	—	—	—	—	—	—	—		Disney Channel Playlist
"Bidi Bidi Bom Bom" (with Selena)	2012	—	— (Note: "Bidi Bidi Bom Bom" did not enter the Billboard Hot 100, but peaked at number 38 on the Billboard Latin Digital Song Sales.)	—	—	—	—	—	—	—	—		Enamorada de Ti (Note: "Bidi Bidi Bom Bom" was originally featured on Selena's posthumous tribute album Enamorada de Ti, and was later included on the compilation album For You.)
"Birthday"	2013	— (Note: "Birthday" did not enter the Billboard Hot 100, but peaked at number 12 on the US Bubbling Under Hot 100 Singles chart.)	—	—	—	—	—	—	—	—	—		Stars Dance
"Stars Dance"	2013	—	—	—	—	102	—	—	—	—	—		Stars Dance
"Sober"	2015	— (Note: "Sober" did not enter the Billboard Hot 100, but peaked at number 22 on the US Bubbling Under Hot 100 Singles chart.)	—	—	—	—	—	—	—	—	—		Revival
"Me & My Girls"	2015	—	—	—	77	—	—	—	—	—	—		Revival (Deluxe)
"Only You"	2017	—	—	—	—	—	—	—	—	— (Note: "Only You" did not enter the UK Singles Chart, but peaked at number 99 on the UK Singles Downloads Chart.)	—		13 Reasons Why
"Dance Again"	2020	— (Note: "Dance Again" did not enter the Billboard Hot 100, but peaked at number 19 on the US Bubbling Under Hot 100 Singles chart.)	—	183	96	—	—	14	124	—	—		Rare
"Ring"	2020	— (Note: "Ring" did not enter the Billboard Hot 100, but peaked at number 17 on the US Bubbling Under Hot 100 Singles chart.)	—	—	—	—	—	15	141	—	—		Rare
"Vulnerable"	2020	— (Note: "Vulnerable" did not enter the Billboard Hot 100, but peaked at number 14 on the US Bubbling Under Hot 100 Singles chart.)	—	162	87	— (Note: "Vulnerable" did not enter the French Singles Chart, but peaked at number 93 on the French Singles Downloads Chart.)	—	13	129	—	—		Rare
"People You Know"	2020	—	—	—	—	—	—	—	143	—	—	ARIA: Gold; RMNZ: Gold	Rare
"Let Me Get Me"	2020	—	—	—	—	—	—	—	178	—	—		Rare
"Crowded Room" (featuring 6lack)	2020	— (Note: "Crowded Room" did not enter the Billboard Hot 100, but peaked at number 20 on the US Bubbling Under Hot 100 Singles chart.)	—	—	92	—	—	—	156	—	—		Rare
"Souvenir"	2020	—	—	—	—	—	—	26	—	—	—		Rare (Deluxe)
"Buscando Amor"	2021	—	— (Note: "Buscando Amor" did not enter the Hot Latin Songs, but peaked at number 13 on the Billboard Latin Digital Song Sales.)	—	—	—	—	—	—	—	—		Revelación
"Dámelo To'" (featuring Myke Towers)	2021	—	20	—	—	—	—	29	—	—	— (Note: "Dámelo To" did not enter the Billboard Global 200 chart, but peaked at number 176 on the Billboard Global Excl. US chart.)		Revelación
"Vicio"	2021	—	— (Note: "Vicio" did not enter the Hot Latin Songs, but peaked at number 22 on the Billboard Latin Digital Song Sales.)	—	—	—	—	—	—	—	—		Revelación
"Adiós"	2021	—	— (Note: "Adiós" did not enter the Hot Latin Songs, but peaked at number 16 on the Billboard Latin Digital Song Sales.)	—	—	—	—	—	—	—	—		Revelación
"Don't Wanna Cry" (with Benny Blanco)	2025	— (Note: "Don't Wanna Cry" did not enter the Billboard Hot 100, but peaked at number 18 on the US Bubbling Under Hot 100 Singles chart.)	—	—	—	—	—	—	—	—	—		I Said I Love You First
"Cowboy" (with Benny Blanco)	2025	— (Note: "Cowboy" did not enter the Billboard Hot 100, but peaked at number 14 on the US Bubbling Under Hot 100 Singles chart.)	—	—	—	—	—	—	—	—	—		I Said I Love You First
"Bluest Flame" (with Benny Blanco)	2025	— (Note: "Bluest Flame" did not enter the Billboard Hot 100, but peaked at number 7 on the US Bubbling Under Hot 100 Singles chart.)	—	—	92	—	17	13	—	47	—		I Said I Love You First
"How Does It Feel to Be Forgotten" (with Benny Blanco)	2025	71	—	—	63	—	81	10	—	86	98		I Said I Love You First
"Talk" (with Benny Blanco)	2025	—	—	—	—	—	—	21	—	—	—		I Said I Love You First... And You Said It Back
"Stained"	2025	—	—	—	—	—	—	—	—	— (Note: "Stained" did not enter the UK Singles Chart, but peaked at number 98 on the UK Singles Downloads Chart.)	—		I Said I Love You First... And You Said It Back
"Pick It Up" (Cardi B featuring Selena Gomez)	2025	45	—	—	—	—	—	17	—	—	157		Am I the Drama?
"—" denotes a recording that did not chart or was not released in that territory.

== See also ==
- List of songs recorded by Selena Gomez
