= Selena Gomez videography =

Videos and media by American singer

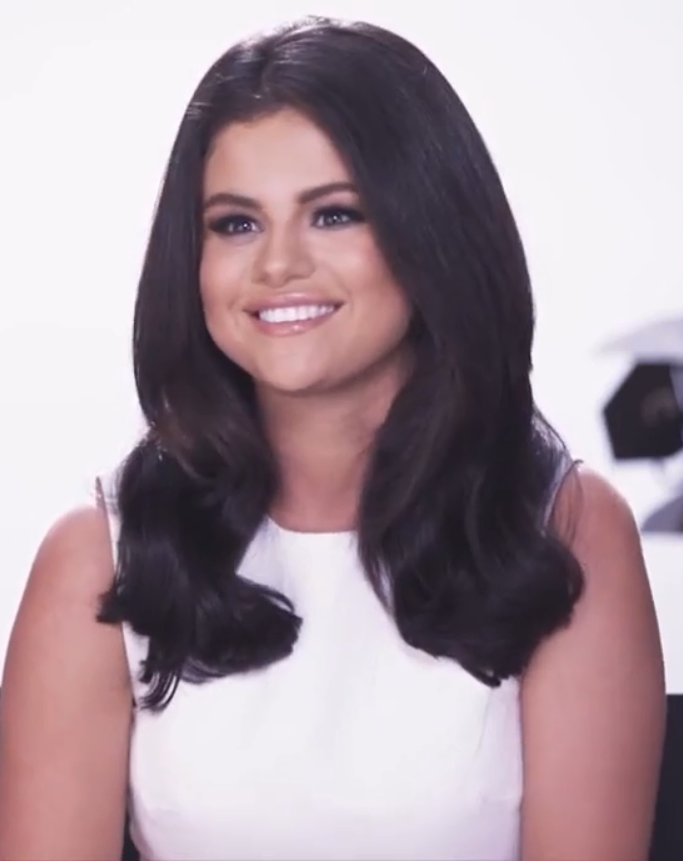
Gomez in a behind the scenes for Pantene

Selena Gomez is an American actress, singer, and producer. She began her acting career as a child on the television series Barney & Friends (2002–2004), before appearing in several Disney Channel productions. She rose to prominence for her starring role as Alex Russo in the sitcom Wizards of Waverly Place (2007–2012). She subsequently starred in the direct-to-video film Another Cinderella Story (2008) and the 2009 Disney Channel films Princess Protection Program and Wizards of Waverly Place: The Movie. She later transitioned to theatrical films with leading roles in Ramona and Beezus (2010) and Monte Carlo (2011).

In 2012, Gomez starred in Harmony Korine's crime film Spring Breakers, marking a departure from her earlier kid-friendly, Disney roles. Her subsequent film work included the comedy-drama The Fundamentals of Caring (2016), the comedy horror The Dead Don't Die (2019), and the romantic comedy A Rainy Day in New York (2019). She also voiced Mavis Dracula in the Hotel Transylvania film franchise (2012–2022). As a producer, Gomez executive produced the Netflix drama series 13 Reasons Why (2017–2020), and hosted and executive produced the HBO Max cooking series Selena + Chef (2020–2023).

Since 2021, Gomez has starred in and executive produced the Hulu mystery-comedy series Only Murders in the Building. For her performance, she won the Satellite Award for Best Actress – Television Series Musical or Comedy, and received nominations for the Critics' Choice Award and the Primetime Emmy Award, as well as four Golden Globe Award nominations, all for Best Actress in a Comedy Series. She was also the subject of the documentary film Selena Gomez: My Mind & Me (2022). In 2024, she starred in Jacques Audiard's Spanish-language musical crime film Emilia Pérez, for which she and her co-stars won the Cannes Film Festival Award for Best Actress. She also received nominations for the BAFTA Award and Golden Globe Award for Best Supporting Actress.

== Filmography ==
=== Film ===
Key
†	Denotes films that have not yet been released

Year	Title	Role	Notes	Ref.
2003	Barney: Read with Me, Dance with Me	Gianna	Direct-to-video	
2003	Spy Kids 3-D: Game Over	Waterpark Girl		
2003	Barney's Best Manners: Your Invitation to Fun!	Gianna	Direct-to-video	
2006	Brain Zapped	Emily Grace Garcia	Short film	
2008	Another Cinderella Story	Mary Santiago	Direct-to-video	
2008	Horton Hears a Who!	Helga (voice)		
2009	Arthur and the Revenge of Maltazard (Note: In the United Kingdom and Ireland, Arthur and the Revenge of Maltazard and Arthur 3: The War of the Two Worlds were combined and released as Arthur and the Great Adventure in 2010.)	Selenia (voice)		
2010	Ramona and Beezus	Beezus Quimby		
2010	Arthur 3: The War of the Two Worlds	Selenia (voice)		
2011	Monte Carlo	Grace / Cordelia Winthrop Scott (Note: Gomez played two different characters in this film.)		
2011	The Muppets	Herself	Cameo	
2012	Spring Breakers	Faith		
2012	Hotel Transylvania	Mavis (voice)		
2012	Aftershock	VIP Girl	Cameo	
2013	Getaway	The Kid		
2013	Girl Rising	Narrator (voice)	Documentary	
2013	Searching	Violet	Short film	
2014	Rudderless	Kate		
2014	Behaving Badly	Nina Pennington		
2015	Unity	Narrator (voice)	Documentary	
2015	Hotel Transylvania 2	Mavis (voice)		
2015	The Big Short	Herself	Uncredited cameo	
2015	The 1989 World Tour Live	Herself	Concert film	
2016	The Fundamentals of Caring	Dot		
2016	Neighbors 2: Sorority Rising	Madison		
2016	In Dubious Battle	Lisa		
2017	Puppy!	Mavis (voice)	Short film	
2018	A Love Story	Girl	Short film	
2018	Hotel Transylvania 3: Summer Vacation	Mavis (voice)		
2019	The Dead Don't Die	Zoe		
2019	A Rainy Day in New York	Chan Tyrell		
2020	Dolittle	Betsy (voice)		
2020	This Is the Year	—N/a	Executive producer	
2020	The Broken Hearts Gallery	—N/a	Executive producer	
2022	Hotel Transylvania: Transformania	Mavis (voice)	Also executive producer	
2022	Selena Gomez: My Mind & Me	Herself	Documentary	
2024	Emilia Pérez	Jessica "Jessi" Del Monte		
2024	Louder: The Soundtrack of Change	Herself	Documentary; also producer	
2025	Making Emilia Pérez	Herself	Short documentary	
2025	Karol G: Tomorrow Was Beautiful	Herself	Documentary; uncredited appearance	
2027	Not Alone †	Fran (voice)	In production	
2027	The Haunting of Hotel Transylvania †	—N/a	Executive producer	
TBA	The Origin of the World †	TBA	Filming	

=== Television ===
Year	Title	Role	Notes
2002–2004	Barney & Friends	Gianna	13 episodes
2005	What's Stevie Thinking?	Stevie Sanchez	Unsold pilot (Note: Cancelled spin-off of Lizzie McGuire.)
2005	Walker, Texas Ranger: Trial by Fire	Julie	Television film
2006	The Suite Life of Zack & Cody	Gwen	Episode: "A Midsummer's Nightmare"
2007	Arwin!	Alexa	Unsold pilot (Note: Cancelled spin-off of The Suite Life of Zack & Cody.)
2007	The Amazing O'Malleys	Julia O'Malley	Unaired pilot (Note: Early concept for Wizards of Waverly Place, originally set in a magic store and centered on twin siblings, before being reworked with a new cast and title.)
2007	Shorty McShorts' Shorts	Ivy (voice)	Unaired episode: "Bad Hair Daze"
2007–2008	Hannah Montana	Mikayla	3 episodes (Note: Uncredited for "(We're So Sorry) Uncle Earl")
2007–2012	Wizards of Waverly Place	Alex Russo	Lead role; 106 episodes
2007	The Hills	Herself	Uncredited; episode: "Young Hollywood"
2008	Jonas Brothers: Living the Dream	Herself	Episode: "Hello Hollywood"
2008	Disney Channel Games	Herself (contestant)	5 episodes
2008	Studio DC: Almost Live	Herself (host)	Television special; episode: "The Second Show"
2008	Disney Channel's Totally New Year	Herself (host)	Television special
2009	Sonny with a Chance	Herself	Episode: "Battle of the Networks' Stars"
2009	Princess Protection Program	Carter	Television film
2009	The Suite Life on Deck	Alex Russo	Episode: "Double-Crossed"
2009	Wizards of Waverly Place: The Movie	Alex Russo	Television film
2009	Extreme Makeover: Home Edition	Herself	Episode: "Scott Family"
2009	Dreams Come True: A Celebration of Disney Animation	Herself	Television special
2011	So Random!	Herself	Episode: "Selena Gomez & the Scene"
2011	2011 MuchMusic Video Awards	Herself (host)	Television special
2011	PrankStars	Herself	Episode: "Something to Chew on"
2011	Make Your Mark: Ultimate Dance Off — Shake It Up Edition	Herself (judge)	Television special
2011	2011 MTV Video Music Awards Pre-Show	Herself (host)	Television special
2011	2011 MTV Europe Music Awards	Herself (host)	Television special
2013	The Wizards Return: Alex vs. Alex	Alex Russo / Evil Alex (Note: Gomez played two different characters in this television special.)	Television special; also executive producer
2014–2015, 2017	We Day	Herself (host)	3 television specials
2015	The Voice	Herself (guest advisor)	4 episodes
2016, 2022	Saturday Night Live	Various	3 episodes
2016	Inside Amy Schumer	Herself	Episode: "Fame"
2017–2020	13 Reasons Why	—N/a	Executive producer
2017	13 Reasons Why: Beyond the Reasons	Herself	Television documentary
2019	Living Undocumented	—N/a	Docuseries; executive producer
2020–2023	Selena + Chef	Herself (host)	Also executive producer
2020	Whose Vote Counts, Explained	Narrator (voice)	Docuseries; episode: "Can You Buy an Election?"
2021	Vax Live: The Concert to Reunite the World	Herself (host)	Television special
2021–present	Only Murders in the Building	Mabel Mora	Main role; 50 episodes; also executive producer
2022	Mi vecino, el cartel	—N/a	Docuseries; executive producer
2023	Dear...	Herself	Docuseries; episode: "Selena Gomez"
2024	Steve! (Martin): A Documentary in 2 Pieces	Herself	Two-part documentary; cameo; episode: "Now"
2024	Selena + Restaurant	Herself (host)	Also executive producer
2024–2026	Wizards Beyond Waverly Place	Alex Russo	7 episodes; also executive producer, and director (episode "The Rift That Keeps on Giving")
2026	Hannah Montana 20th Anniversary Special	Herself	Television special

=== Web ===
Year	Title	Role	Notes	Ref.
2010	Selena Gomez: Girl Meets World	Herself	Short docuseries	
2012	Fifty Shades of Blue	Woman	Funny or Die short	
2013	Austin Mahone Takeover	Herself	Episode: "Austin Mahone and Selena Gomez at the Billboard Music Awards"	
2025	Suspicious Minds: AI and Psychosis	—N/a	Executive producer; docuseries, also released as a podcast	
2025	Actors on Actors	Herself	Episode: "Selena Gomez & Saoirse Ronan"	

== Music videos ==
Year	Title	Other performer(s) credited	Director(s)	Ref.
2008	"Cruella de Vil"	None	Unknown	
2008	"Fly to Your Heart"	None	Unknown	
2008	"Tell Me Something I Don't Know"	None	Elliott Lester	
2009	"New Classic"	Drew Seeley	Kenny Stoff	
2009	"One and the Same"	Demi Lovato	Brandon Dickerson	
2009	"Magic"	None	Roman Perez	
2009	"Send It On"	Miley Cyrus; Demi Lovato; Jonas Brothers	F. Michael Blum	
2013	"Come & Get It"	None	Anthony Mandler	
2013	"Slow Down"	None	Philip Andelman	
2013	"Birthday"	None	Ben Renschen	
2014	"Hold On"	Ben Kweller	William H. Macy	
2014	"The Heart Wants What It Wants"	None	Dawn Shadforth	
2015	"I Want You to Know"	Zedd	Brent Bonacorso	
2015	"Good for You" +(Explicit version featuring ASAP Rocky) (Note: A second version of the video was later released, featuring additional scenes with ASAP Rocky.)	None	Sophie Muller	
2015	"Same Old Love"	None	Michael Haussman	
2016	"Hands to Myself"	None	Alek Keshishian	
2016	"Kill Em with Kindness"	None	Emil Nava	
2016	"We Don't Talk Anymore" (Note: Gomez does not appear in the official video.)	Charlie Puth	Phil Pinto	
2016	"Trust Nobody"	Cashmere Cat; Tory Lanez	Jake Schreier	
2017	"It Ain't Me"	Kygo	Philip R. Lopez	
2017	"Bad Liar" (Spotify-exclusive video)	None	Petra Collins	
2017	"Bad Liar"	None	Jesse Peretz	
2017	"Fetish"	Gucci Mane	Petra Collins	
2017	"Wolves" (Vertical Video)	Marshmello	Harry McNally	
2017	"Wolves"	Marshmello	Colin Tilley	
2018	"Back to You" +(Vertical Video) (Note: A vertical video was released ahead of the official music video, featuring behind-the-scenes footage from its production.)	None	Scott Cudmore	
2018	"Taki Taki"	DJ Snake; Ozuna; Cardi B	Colin Tilley	
2019	"I Can't Get Enough"	Benny Blanco; J Balvin; Tainy	Jake Schreier	
2019	"Lose You to Love Me"	None	Sophie Muller	
2019	"Look at Her Now"	None	Sophie Muller	
2020	"Rare"	None	BRTHR	
2020	"Lose You to Love Me" (Alternative Video)	None	Sophie Muller	
2020	"Dance Again" (Performance Video)	None	Craig Murray	
2020	"Boyfriend"	None	Matty Peacock	
2020	"Past Life"	Trevor Daniel	Vania Heymann; Gal Muggia	
2020	"Ice Cream"	Blackpink	Seo Hyun-Seung	
2021	"De Una Vez"	None	Los Pérez	
2021	"Baila Conmigo"	Rauw Alejandro	Fernando Nogari	
2021	"Baila Conmigo" (Performance Video)	Rauw Alejandro	Fernando Nogari	
2021	"Selfish Love"	DJ Snake	Rodrigo Saavedra	
2021	"999"	Camilo	Sophie Muller	
2022	"Let Somebody Go"	Coldplay	Dave Meyers	
2022	"Calm Down"	Rema	Charm La'Donna	
2022	"My Mind & Me" (Film version)	None	Unknown	
2023	"Single Soon"	None	Philip Andelman	
2024	"Love On"	None	Gregory Ohrel	
2025	"Call Me When You Break Up"	Benny Blanco; Gracie Abrams	Benny Blanco	
2025	"Sunset Blvd"	Benny Blanco	Petra Collins	
2025	"Younger and Hotter Than Me"	Benny Blanco	Jake Schreier	
2025	"Talk"	Benny Blanco	Tony Yacenda	
2025	"In the Dark"	None	Luke Orlando	
2026	"Te Olvido (La La)"	Benny Blanco; Becky G	Stillz	

=== Guest appearances ===
Year	Title	Performer(s)	Director(s)	Ref.
2008	"We Rock" (Around the World version)	Cast of Camp Rock	Unknown	
2008	"Burnin' Up"	Jonas Brothers	Brendan Malloy; Tim Wheeler	
2011	"The Dance Routine"	The Midnight Beast	Adam Barton	
2013	"Everybody Knows"	Dustin Tavella	Unknown	
2013	"City of Angels"	Thirty Seconds to Mars	Jared Leto	
2015	"Bad Blood"	Taylor Swift featuring Kendrick Lamar	Joseph Kahn	
