= List of number-one Billboard Latin Pop Airplay songs of 2024 =

The Billboard Latin Pop Airplay is a subchart of the Latin Airplay chart that ranks the most-played Latin pop songs on Latin radio stations. Published by Billboard magazine, the data are compiled by Nielsen SoundScan based collectively on each single's weekly airplay.

== Chart history ==
Issue date	Song	Artist	Ref.
January 6	"Copa Vacía"	Shakira and Manuel Turizo	
January 13	"No Es Normal"	Venesti, Nacho and Maffio	
January 20	"No Es Normal"	Venesti, Nacho and Maffio	
January 27	"No Es Normal"	Venesti, Nacho and Maffio	
February 3	"No Es Normal"	Venesti, Nacho and Maffio	
February 10	"No Es Normal"	Venesti, Nacho and Maffio	
February 17	"No Es Normal"	Venesti, Nacho and Maffio	
February 24	"No Es Normal"	Venesti, Nacho and Maffio	
March 2	"TQMQA"	Eladio Carrión	
March 9	"No Es Normal"	Venesti, Nacho and Maffio	
March 16	"No Es Normal"	Venesti, Nacho and Maffio	
March 23	"No Es Normal"	Venesti, Nacho and Maffio	
March 30	"TQMQA"	Eladio Carrión	
April 6	"Puntería"	Shakira and Cardi B	
April 13	"TQMQA"	Eladio Carrión	
April 20	"TQMQA"	Eladio Carrión	
April 27	"Puntería"	Shakira and Cardi B	
May 4	"Puntería"	Shakira and Cardi B	
May 11	"Puntería"	Shakira and Cardi B	
May 18	"Puntería"	Shakira and Cardi B	
May 25	"Puntería"	Shakira and Cardi B	
June 1	"Puntería"	Shakira and Cardi B	
June 8	"Puntería"	Shakira and Cardi B	
June 15	"Amor"	Danny Ocean	
June 22	"Amor"	Danny Ocean	
June 29	"Igual Que Un Ángel"	Kali Uchis and Peso Pluma	
July 6	"Te Va a Doler"	Thalía and Grupo Firme	
July 13	"Puntería"	Shakira and Cardi B	
July 20	"Es Normal"	Venesti	
July 27	"Es Normal"	Venesti	
August 3	"Es Normal"	Venesti	
August 10	"Es Normal"	Venesti	
August 17	"La Mision"	Piso 21 and Wisin	
August 24	"Touching the Sky"	Rauw Alejandro	
August 31	"Santa Marta"	Luis Fonsi and Carlos Vives	
September 7	"Santa Marta"	Luis Fonsi and Carlos Vives	
September 14	"Santa Marta"	Luis Fonsi and Carlos Vives	
September 21	"Santa Marta"	Luis Fonsi and Carlos Vives	
September 28	"Santa Marta"	Luis Fonsi and Carlos Vives	
October 5	"Santa Marta"	Luis Fonsi and Carlos Vives	
October 12	"Santa Marta"	Luis Fonsi and Carlos Vives	
October 19	"Soltera"	Shakira	
October 26	"Soltera"	Shakira	
November 2	"Soltera"	Shakira	
November 9	"Soltera"	Shakira	
November 16	"Soltera"	Shakira	
November 23	"Soltera"	Shakira	
November 30	"Soltera"	Shakira	
December 7	"Soltera"	Shakira	
December 14	"Soltera"	Shakira	
December 21	"Soltera"	Shakira	
December 28	"Soltera"	Shakira	
