= Soltera (Shakira song) =

2024 single by Shakira

Single by Shakira
- Released: 25 September 2024
- Genre: Afrobeats; shatta
- Length: 3:35
- Label: Sony Latin
- Songwriters: Shakira; Keityn; Édgar Barrera; Bizarrap
- Producers: Shakira; AC

Shakira singles chronology
"(Entre Paréntesis)" (2024)	"Soltera" (2024)	"Bésame" (2025)

Music video
- "Soltera" on YouTube

"Soltera" (Single) is a song by Colombian singer-songwriter Shakira. It was released through Sony Music Latin on 25 September 2024.

== Background ==
On 22 March 2024, Shakira released her twelfth studio album, Las Mujeres Ya No Lloran. On 13 June 2024, she revealed in an interview for Rolling Stone that "there are some songs we have lying around" from the album sessions and that "it's not a new album, but let's say I have a new project".

On 14 September 2024, Shakira was seen filming a music video at LIV nightclub in Miami, Florida. On 20 September, she revealed the single's release date and cover art featuring herself partying with Anitta, Danna Paola, Lele Pons.

"Soltera" is a afrobeats and tropical-pop song with notes of kizomba and calypso rhythms.

== Music video ==
The music video was directed by Jaume de la Iguana. Its cinematography was handled by Rafa Lluch. It features Anitta, Danna Paola, Karolína Kurková, Lele Pons, Natti Natasha, Winnie Harlow, Bizarrap and Harry Jowsey.

== Reception ==
Lizzette Vela from e-consulta.com commented that the song "promises to be a hymn of feminine liberty and empowerment", continuing how Shakira "invites people to celebrate independence and challenges critics of her personal life" in the lyrics.

Chris Malone Mendez of Forbes described the song as a "spiritual successor" to "Bzrp Music Sessions, Vol. 53", because the singer sang about "having the right to behave badly and have a good time, celebrating being free and doing as she pleases, and enjoying living a single life".

Writing for Italian online newspaper Fanpage.it, Elena Betti stated that "Shakira wants to be alone" because the song is "a hymn to independence". Betti stressed that the song is about "a story that surely marked her deeply", probably about her ex-husband Gerard Piqué and the fact that "Shakira says she changed friends because those who were left kept telling her about him".

== Charts ==
=== Weekly charts ===
Weekly chart performance for "Soltera"
Chart (2024–2026)	Peak position
Argentina Hot 100 (Billboard)	7
Argentina Airplay (Monitor Latino)	1
Brazil Airplay (Top 10 Latino)	1
Bolivia Airplay (Monitor Latino)	1
Bolivia (Billboard)	5
Central America Airplay (Monitor Latino)	1
Central America + Caribbean (FONOTICA)	1
Chile Airplay (Monitor Latino)	3
Chile (Billboard)	5
Colombia Airplay (Monitor Latino)	1
Colombia Airplay (National-Report)	1
Colombia (Billboard)	5
Costa Rica Airplay (Monitor Latino)	1
Costa Rica Streaming (FONOTICA)	1
Dominican Republic Airplay (Monitor Latino)	4
Ecuador Airplay (Monitor Latino)	1
Ecuador (Billboard)	3
El Salvador Airplay (Monitor Latino)	2
Global 200 (Billboard)	28
Guatemala Airplay (Monitor Latino)	5
Honduras Airplay (Monitor Latino)	1
Italy Airplay (EarOne)	52
Latin America Airplay (Monitor Latino)	1
Mexico Airplay (Monitor Latino)	1
Mexico (Billboard)	25
Nicaragua Airplay (Monitor Latino)	3
Panama Airplay (Monitor Latino)	1
Panama International (PRODUCE)	5
Paraguay Airplay (Monitor Latino)	4
Peru Airplay (Monitor Latino)	1
Peru (Billboard)	3
Puerto Rico Airplay (Monitor Latino)	1
Portugal (AFP)	73
Romania Airplay (TopHit)	54
Spain (PROMUSICAE)	4
Uruguay Airplay (Monitor Latino)	2
US Bubbling Under Hot 100 (Billboard)	13
US Hot Latin Songs (Billboard)	9
US Latin Airplay (Billboard)	1
US Latin Pop Airplay (Billboard)	1
Venezuela Airplay (Record Report)	1

=== Monthly charts ===
Monthly chart performance for "Soltera"
Chart (2025)	Peak position
Romania Airplay (TopHit)	66
Uruguay Streaming (CUD)	9

=== Yearly charts ===
2024 year-end chart performance for "Soltera"
Chart (2024)	Peak position
Spain Airplay (PROMUSICAE)	42

2025 year-end chart performance for "Soltera"
Chart (2025)	Position
Argentina Airplay (Monitor Latino)	2
Bolivia Airplay (Monitor Latino)	22
Central America Airplay (Monitor Latino)	4
Chile Airplay (Monitor Latino)	1
Spain (PROMUSICAE)	92

== Certifications ==
Certifications for "Soltera"
Region	Certification	Certified units/sales
Brazil (Pro-Música Brasil)	Platinum	40,000^{‡}
Colombia	Diamond	
Mexico (AMPROFON)	3× Platinum	420,000^{‡}
Spain (Promusicae)	2× Platinum	120,000^{‡}
United States (RIAA)	Platinum (Latin)	60,000^{‡}
Streaming
Central America (CFC)	2× Platinum	14,000,000^{†}
^{‡} Sales+streaming figures based on certification alone.^{†} Streaming-only figures based on certification alone.

== See also ==
- List of Billboard Latin Pop Airplay number ones of 2024
- List of Billboard number-one Latin pop songs of 2025
- List of Billboard Hot Latin Songs and Latin Airplay number ones of 2025
