= List of Billboard number-one Latin pop songs of 2025 =

Hot Latin Pop Songs and Latin Pop Airplay are charts that rank the top-performing Latin pop songs in the United States, published by Billboard magazine.

== Chart history ==
Chart history
Issue date	Hot Latin Pop Songs			Latin Pop Airplay		
Issue date	Title	Artist(s)	Ref.	Title	Artist(s)	Ref.
January 4	—N/a			"Soltera"	Shakira	
January 11	—N/a			"Soltera"	Shakira	
January 18	—N/a			"Soltera"	Shakira	
January 25	—N/a			"Soltera"	Shakira	
February 1	—N/a			"Soltera"	Shakira	
February 8	—N/a			"Soltera"	Shakira	
February 15	—N/a			"Soltera"	Shakira	
February 22	—N/a			"Cables Cruzados"	Faruko	
March 1	—N/a			"Cosas Pendientes"	Maluma	
March 8	—N/a			"Fuera de Lugar"	Venesti	
March 15	—N/a			"Imaginate"	Danny Ocean and Kapo	
March 22	—N/a			"Imaginate"	Danny Ocean and Kapo	
March 29	—N/a			"Imaginate"	Danny Ocean and Kapo	
April 4	—N/a			"Imaginate"	Danny Ocean and Kapo	
April 12	"Ojos Tristes"	Selena Gomez, Benny Blanco and The Marias		"Imaginate"	Danny Ocean and Kapo	
April 19	"Ojos Tristes"	Selena Gomez, Benny Blanco and The Marias		"Imaginate"	Danny Ocean and Kapo	
April 26	"Ojos Tristes"	Selena Gomez, Benny Blanco and The Marias		"Imaginate"	Danny Ocean and Kapo	
May 3	"Ojos Tristes"	Selena Gomez, Benny Blanco and The Marias		"Yo Me Lo Busqué"	Thalía and Los Ángeles Azules	
May 10	"Ojos Tristes"	Selena Gomez, Benny Blanco and The Marias		"Raices"	Gloria Estefan	
May 17	"Ojos Tristes"	Selena Gomez, Benny Blanco and The Marias		"Raices"	Gloria Estefan	
May 24	"Milagros"	Karol G		"Raices"	Gloria Estefan	
May 31	"Milagros"	Karol G		"Carita Linda"	Rauw Alejandro	
June 7	"Ojos Tristes"	Selena Gomez, Benny Blanco and The Marias		"Carita Linda"	Rauw Alejandro	
June 14	"Ojos Tristes"	Selena Gomez, Benny Blanco and The Marias		"Carita Linda"	Rauw Alejandro	
June 21	"Ojos Tristes"	Selena Gomez, Benny Blanco and The Marias		"Carita Linda"	Rauw Alejandro	
June 28	"Ojos Tristes"	Selena Gomez, Benny Blanco and The Marias		"La Pelirroja"	Sebastian Yatra	
July 5	"Coleccionando Heridas"	Karol G and Marco Antonio Solís		"La Pelirroja"	Sebastian Yatra	
July 12	"Coleccionando Heridas"	Karol G and Marco Antonio Solís		"La Pelirroja"	Sebastian Yatra	
July 19	"Coleccionando Heridas"	Karol G and Marco Antonio Solís		"Carita Linda"	Rauw Alejandro	
July 26	"Coleccionando Heridas"	Karol G and Marco Antonio Solís		"Carita Linda"	Rauw Alejandro	
August 2	"Coleccionando Heridas"	Karol G and Marco Antonio Solís		"Me toca a mí"	Morat and Camilo	
August 9	"Ojos Tristes"	Selena Gomez, Benny Blanco and The Marias		"Soleao"	Myke Towers and Quevedo	
August 16	"Ojos Tristes"	Selena Gomez, Benny Blanco and The Marias		"Soleao"	Myke Towers and Quevedo	
August 23	"Ojos Tristes"	Selena Gomez, Benny Blanco and The Marias		"Ojos Tristes"	Selena Gomez, Benny Blanco and The Marias	
August 30	"Ojos Tristes"	Selena Gomez, Benny Blanco and The Marias		"Ojos Tristes"	Selena Gomez, Benny Blanco and The Marias	
September 6	"Ojos Tristes"	Selena Gomez, Benny Blanco and The Marias		"Soleao"	Myke Towers and Quevedo	
September 13	"Ojos Tristes"	Selena Gomez, Benny Blanco and The Marias		"Vivir Sin Aire"	Carín León and Maná	
September 20	"Ojos Tristes"	Selena Gomez, Benny Blanco and The Marias		"Soleao"	Myke Towers and Quevedo	
September 27	"GuabanSexxx"	Rauw Alejandro		"Bronceador"	Maluma	
October 4	"Culpable"	Junior H		"Bronceador"	Maluma	
October 11	"Besito en la Frente"	Rauw Alejandro		"Bronceador"	Maluma	
October 18	"Weltita"	Bad Bunny and Chuwi		"Bronceador"	Maluma	
October 25	"Coleccionando Heridas"	Karol G and Marco Antonio Solís		"Bronceador"	Maluma	
November 1	"Coleccionando Heridas"	Karol G and Marco Antonio Solís		"Bronceador"	Maluma	
November 8	"Coleccionando Heridas"	Karol G and Marco Antonio Solís		"Bronceador"	Maluma	
November 15	"Coleccionando Heridas"	Karol G and Marco Antonio Solís		"Tengo Celos"	Myke Towers	
November 22	"La Perla"	Rosalía and Yahritza y su Esencia		"Dificile"	Venesti and Mike Bahía	
November 29	"La Perla"	Rosalía and Yahritza y su Esencia		"Dificile"	Venesti and Mike Bahía	
December 6	"La Perla"	Rosalía and Yahritza y su Esencia		"Besito en la Frente"	Rauw Alejandro	
December 13	"La Perla"	Rosalía and Yahritza y su Esencia		"Besito en la Frente"	Rauw Alejandro	
December 20	"La Perla"	Rosalía and Yahritza y su Esencia		"Sin Ti"	Morat and Jay Wheeler	
December 27	"La Perla"	Rosalía and Yahritza y su Esencia		"Sin Ti"	Morat and Jay Wheeler	
