= Spotlight (Marshmello and Lil Peep song) =

Single by Marshmello and Lil Peep
- Released: January 12, 2018
- Recorded: November 2017
- Length: 2:57
- Label: Joytime Collective; Geffen

Marshmello singles chronology
"Wolves" (2017)	"Spotlight" (2018)	"Friends" (2018)

Lil Peep singles chronology
"Avoid" (2017)	"Spotlight" (2018)	"4 Gold Chains" (2018)

Music video
- "Spotlight" on YouTube

"Spotlight" is a song by American music producer Marshmello and American rapper Lil Peep. It was released on January 12, 2018, as a tribute to Peep following his death. Marshmello initially had no plans of releasing the song until Peep's mother made a request. The song is the rapper's first posthumous release.

== Background ==
Marshmello was among the first artists in the dance music community to comment on Peep's death. In a series of tweets, Marshmello says Peep was "the nicest person" and that they had spoken about a collaboration a week before. "Peep was the nicest person. Hanging out with him, talking to him about music, the song ideas we were going to do together and touring was so amazing. Everyone will miss you man," he wrote. On November 20, 2017, Marshmello worked a live tribute into his performance at GoldRush Festival in Arizona, by mixing the rapper's song "Beamer Boy" into his set, as a large image of Peep reading "RIP" appeared on the screen behind him.

On December 20, 2017, it was announced that Marshmello would release the song on January 12, 2018. A spokesperson said the pair began working on the song before Peep died, and that it will be accompanied by a music video. While some fans questioned Marshmello's decision, since other artists are withholding their work with Peep, he revealed that Peep's mother encouraged him to release it as a tribute to her son. He wrote in a tweet: "I didn't plan on releasing the song until peeps mom reached out and told me she wanted her sons music to come out...what am I supposed to do?" On January 10, 2018, Marshmello unveiled the song's title and artwork on social media. He later uploaded a brief audio preview of the track on social media.

Marshmello praised Peep's enthusiasm for making music in a statement, writing: "Peep brought an excitement to music that was unparalleled to anybody I've ever met. We started an idea together, that unfortunately we were never able to officially finish together. When I listen to this track now I get chills wishing he could hear it. This record is dedicated to Peep's mother, family, friends and his fans. Gus will live forever through his music and that is something we should all be extremely thankful for." Peep's mother added that she was appreciative that Marshmello released the song since it continued "to allow Peep's voice to be heard through his art."

== Critical reception ==
Beatrice Hazlehurst of Paper regarded it as "a classic example of Peep's emo garage-rap that made him so popular". Colin Joyce of Vice called the song a "heartbreaker", and described it as "slow-moving, but starry-eyed". He wrote that Marshmello "bends in Peep's direction" by "offering foreboding mid-aughts-emo-intro guitar line for [Peep] to sing over before launching into the skyscraper-scale drums", similar to his collaboration with Migos, "Danger", and his remix of the Future song "Mask Off". Sheldon Pearce of Pitchfork deemed the song "a reminder of Peep's promise as a rap-rock spitfire", with "all the urgency of the more lovestruck Peep tracks, full of obsession and contempt". Jeff Benjamin of Fuse wrote that it "honors Peep's signature trap/emo sound and his knack for brutally honest storytelling", and that "the track indicated bigger things coming for Lil Peep as he edged closer and closer to mainstream accessibility, bringing an exciting new look and sound to the scene". He noted that the song does not feature Marshmello's signature sound, and "instead plays more to Peep's trap styles". Similarly, Eric Skelton of Complex opined that it strays away from Marshmello's style, and "is more in line with the grungy pop-punk aesthetic Lil Peep was known for". Your EDM's Karlie Powell also wrote: "Don't expect the usual, bubbly Marshmello beat, because Lil Peep's bold style is front and center on this one." Jon Wiederhorn of CBS Radio wrote: "The melancholy track combines melodic vocals with smooth rapping and the lyrics address a painful breakup." Molly Hudelson of Substream Magazine opined that it is "more somber in sound than most of Marshmello's releases", and found "the themes of heartache and feeling 'all alone again' are relatable to anyone who's gone through a breakup or otherwise lost someone they loved".

== Charts ==
Chart performance for "Spotlight"
Chart (2017)	Peak position
Austria (Ö3 Austria Top 40)	53
Canada Hot 100 (Billboard)	73
Hungary (Stream Top 40)	34
New Zealand Heatseekers (RMNZ)	3
Sweden (Sverigetopplistan)	61
UK Singles (OCC)	74
US Bubbling Under Hot 100 (Billboard)	3

== Certifications ==
Certifications for "Spotlight"
Region	Certification	Certified units/sales
New Zealand (RMNZ)	Platinum	30,000^{‡}
United Kingdom (BPI)	Silver	200,000^{‡}
United States (RIAA)	Platinum	1,000,000^{‡}
^{‡} Sales+streaming figures based on certification alone.
