= Scared of Loving You =

Promotional single by Selena Gomez and Benny Blanco

from the album I Said I Love You First
- Released: February 13, 2025
- Studio: 555 Studios (Los Angeles, California); Doheny Studios (West Hollywood, California); Astronave Studios (Los Angeles, California); House of Breaking Glass (Seattle, Washington)
- Genre: Ballad
- Length: 1:50
- Label: SMG Music LLC; Friends Keep Secrets; Interscope
- Songwriters: Selena Gomez; Benjamin Levin; Finneas O'Connell
- Producers: Benny Blanco; Finneas

Selena Gomez promotional singles chronology
"Feel Me" (2020)	"Scared of Loving You" (2025)	"Younger and Hotter Than Me" (2025)

Lyric video
- "Scared of Loving You" on YouTube

"Scared of Loving You" is a song by American singer Selena Gomez and American record producer Benny Blanco, released as the first promotional single from Gomez and Blanco's collaborative studio album, I Said I Love You First. Gomez and Blanco wrote the song with Finneas O'Connell. The latter two also produced the song. SMG Music LLC, Friends Keep Secrets and Interscope Records released the song for download and streaming on February 13, 2025.

== Background and release ==
In February 2025, Gomez and Blanco began hinting at a collaborative project. On February 13, 2025, they officially announced their joint album, I Said I Love You First, set for release on March 21, 2025. Alongside the announcement, they revealed a new song, Scared of Loving You, which would be available on digital platforms immediately in celebration of Valentine's Day.

== Charts ==
Chart performance for "Scared of Loving You"
Chart (2025)	Peak position
Canada Hot 100 (Billboard)	97
New Zealand Hot Singles (RMNZ)	14
US Bubbling Under Hot 100 (Billboard)	12

== Release history ==
Release dates and formats for "Scared of Loving You"
Region	Date	Format	Label	Ref.
Various	February 13, 2025	Digital download; streaming	SMG Music LLC; Friends Keep Secrets; Interscope	
