= How Does It Feel to Be Forgotten =

Song by Selena Gomez and Benny Blanco

from the album I Said I Love You First
- Released: March 21, 2025
- Studio: Doheny Studios (West Hollywood, California); Valentine Recording Studios (Valley Village, California); House of Breaking Glass (Seattle, Washington)
- Genre: Pop
- Length: 2:41
- Label: SMG Music LLC; Friends Keep Secrets; Interscope
- Songwriters: Selena Gomez; Benjamin Levin; John Sudduth; Justin Tranter; William Fly
- Producers: Benny Blanco; Bart Schoudel

Lyric video
- "How Does It Feel to Be Forgotten'" on YouTube

"How Does It Feel to Be Forgotten" is a song by American singer Selena Gomez and American record producer Benny Blanco. It appears as the ninth track on Gomez and Blanco's collaborative studio album, I Said I Love You First. The song was written by Gomez, Benny Blanco, Mikky Ekko, Justin Tranter, and William Fly, and produced by Benny Blanco, and Bart Schoudel. A live Vevo performance version appears on the album's deluxe edition.

== Background ==
In the narrated edition of Gomez and Blanco's album, I Said I Love You First, made available through Gomez's official store on March 23, 2025, Gomez introduces "How Does It Feel to Be Forgotten", saying the album draws on "experiences [we've] had together" in the past and present; she pushes back against readings that tie the song to her past, stating it is "not [my] past" and was meant simply as "an honest" statement.

== Critical reception ==
Jason Lipshutz of Billboard called "How Does It Feel to Be Forgotten" "enlightened", writing that Gomez is "diving in to Lana Del Rey's sonic territory" as "sparse verses slide into booming, full-throated choruses". Olivia Horn of Pitchfork highlighted her "heavy-lidded" delivery and "deliciously bitchy" lyrics, adding that Blanco's production "cleans up Dan Auerbach's from Ultraviolence". Georgia Evans of NME described the "basic production" as "an intimate backdrop" for a "gleaming diss track" delivered in the whisper-pop style Blanco credits to Gomez, noting that such direct moments reveal "chemistry between the duo".

== Charts ==
Chart performance for "How Does It Feel to Be Forgotten"
Chart (2025)	Peak position
Canada Hot 100 (Billboard)	63
Global 200 (Billboard)	98
Ireland (IRMA)	81
New Zealand Hot Singles (RMNZ)	10
UK Singles (Official Charts)	86
US Billboard Hot 100	71

== Certifications ==
Certifications for "How Does It Feel to Be Forgotten"
Region	Certification	Certified units/sales
Brazil (Pro-Música Brasil)	Gold	20,000^{‡}
^{‡} Sales+streaming figures based on certification alone.

== Release history ==
Release dates and formats for "How Does It Feel to Be Forgotten"
Region	Date	Format	Version	Label	Ref.
Various	March 21, 2025	Digital download; streaming	Original	SMG Music; Friends Keep Secrets; Interscope	
Various	May 2, 2025	Digital download; streaming	Live from Vevo	SMG Music; Friends Keep Secrets; Interscope	
