= I Said I Love You First =

Studio album by Selena Gomez and Benny Blanco
- Released: March 21, 2025
- Studios: 555 (Los Angeles, CA); Doheny (West Hollywood, CA); Astronave (Los Angeles, CA); Doheny (West Hollywood, CA); Valentine (Valley Village, CA); Kwap (Los Angeles, CA); Peepee Palace (Los Angeles, CA); Waterfalls (Paris, France); House of Breaking Glass (Seattle, WA); Blackwood Studios (Studio City, CA); 5020 (Miami, FL); Sweet Victory (London, England)
- Genres: Pop; alt-pop; bedroom pop
- Length: 34:38
- Languages: English; Spanish
- Labels: SMG; Friends Keep Secrets; Interscope
- Producers: Benny Blanco; Dylan Brady; Cashmere Cat; Chrome Sparks; Josh Conway; Finneas; Sebastian; Blake Slatkin; Tainy; María Zardoya

Selena Gomez chronology
| Revelación (2021) | I Said I Love You First (2025) |

Benny Blanco chronology
| Friends Keep Secrets (2018) | I Said I Love You First (2025) | Hermoso (2026) |

Singles from I Said I Love You First
- 1. "Call Me When You Break Up" Released: February 20, 2025; 2. "Sunset Blvd" Released: March 14, 2025; 3. "Ojos Tristes" Released: April 28, 2025

I Said I Love You First is a collaborative studio album by American singer Selena Gomez and American record producer Benny Blanco. Following their respective studio albums Rare (2020) and Friends Keep Secrets (2018), it was released on March 21, 2025, through SMG Music, Friends Keep Secrets, and Interscope Records. The album features guest appearances from Gracie Abrams, the Marías, Tainy, and J Balvin, with additional contributions from Charli XCX and Finneas.

I Said I Love You First achieved the biggest first-week album sales for Gomez and Blanco's careers in the United States, debuting at number-two on the Billboard 200. It became the first album by a real-life couple to top the Vinyl Albums chart in history. Internationally, the album has charted within the top-10 in 15 counties. The album further received generally favorable reviews from critics; Rolling Stone named it as one of the best albums of 2025. The track "Bluest Flame" received a nomination for Best Dance Pop Recording at the 68th Annual Grammy Awards.

== Background ==
The first time Gomez and Blanco collaborated in the studio was for the former's second solo studio album, Revival. For the album, Blanco has production credits on the singles "Kill Em with Kindness" and "Same Old Love". The pair then returned to the studio to record the collaborative single "I Can't Get Enough" with Tainy and J Balvin, which was released in February 2019. Later, Blanco also participated in the creation of Gomez's standalone single "Single Soon", which was released in August 2023.

In December 2023, Gomez officially confirmed her relationship with Blanco, and in December 2024, the couple officially announced their engagement. In October 2024, Gomez stated that she had no date in mind for her next album's release, telling Variety "I currently don't have anything, but I will say music is going to always be a part of me," and, "I don't think any movements are happening right now, but it will always be in my life." Gomez later affirmed "Music isn't going away," and "I just set it down for a second." On January 17, 2025, Blanco shared a short clip on TikTok responding to a fan who wrote him, "Benny please make some new songs for our queen." The clip showed Gomez recording music in her home studio. Then on January 23, 2025, Gomez shared a video on her social media while working on new music in her home recording studio. After a number of speculations, on February 13, Gomez announced the release of the album on March 21 and released a surprise promotional single "Scared of Loving You" for Valentine's Day. Many different signed, regular and limited CD, LP and 12-inch vinyls of the album were available for pre-order, along with pre-saving on streaming platforms.

== Release and composition ==
Gomez announced her engagement to Blanco on December 11, 2024. Two months later, she revealed they worked on a collaborative studio album, writing in an Instagram post: "my NEW album I Said I Love You First with my best friend @itsbennyblanco, is out on 3/21". According to a press release, the album will celebrate "the pair's love story" and "chronicles their entire story—before they met, falling in love and looking to what the future holds".

I Said I Love You First is a pop, alt-pop, and bedroom pop album that also includes elements of synth-pop, pop rock, folk-pop, Latin pop and hyperpop. It follows a narrative starting with the end of a failed relationship to the meeting between Gomez and Blanco to "the couple's present-day happiness". Its first track is a voice recording of a speech given by Gomez to the cast and crew of Wizards of Waverly Place.

As part of the album's extended rollout, Gomez made the previously unreleased 2016 track "Stained", available for digital download via her official website on March 22, 2025. Two days later, on March 24, a new special track titled "Talk" was released as a digital exclusive; the song had previously been featured in an Apple commercial to promote the iPhone 16e and interpolates Cake's "Never There". Gomez released the Seven Heavens Version of the album for digital download on March 25, featuring the song "That's When I'll Care". The following day, she released the Call Me When You Break Up Special Edition, which included the acoustic and extended versions of "Call Me When You Break Up". She further released two digital limited editions, with live from Vevo recordings of "Scared of Loving You" and "How Does It Feel to Be Forgotten" included respectively. On April 30, she announced the deluxe version of the album, titled I Said I Love You First... and You Said It Back, to be released on May 2.

== Promotion ==
Gomez and Blanco revealed the track list of their upcoming album, I Said I Love You First on March 4. On March 19, Gomez and Blanco appeared on Spotify's Countdown To series to talk about the creation of the album. Hot Ones, a YouTube series, released an episode featuring an interview with Blanco and Gomez on March 20. An interview on The Tonight Show Starring Jimmy Fallon was released on March 21 to promote the album.

=== Singles ===
On February 13, 2025, "Scared of Loving You" was surprised released for Valentine's Day and was released as the album's first promotional single, alongside an official lyric video. It is a ballad written with Finneas O'Connell. The lead single, "Call Me When You Break Up", was released the following week on February 20, 2025. The song is a collaboration with American singer-songwriter Gracie Abrams. "Sunset Blvd" was released as the album's second single on March 14, 2025, alongside a music video. "Younger and Hotter Than Me" was released as a promotional single, along with the album's release. "Ojos Tristes" was released as the album's third single.

== Critical reception ==
Professional ratings
Aggregate scores
| Source | Rating |
|---|---|
| AnyDecentMusic? | 6.0/10 |
| Metacritic | 66/100 |
Review scores
| Source | Rating |
| AllMusic | 4/5 stars |
| Clash | 8/10 |
| The Guardian | 2/5 stars |
| NME | 3/5 stars |
| Pitchfork | 5.9/10 |
| Rolling Stone | 3.5/5 stars |
| Sputnikmusic | 3/5 |

According to the review aggregator Metacritic, I Said I Love You First received "generally favorable reviews" based on a weighted average score of 66 out of 100 from ten critic scores. Martina Rebecca Inchingolo of the Associated Press complimented I Said I Love You First for its inclusion of guest artists and its experimentation with different genres. Jason Lipshutz of Billboard said that Gomez "at long last adds a compelling new entry to her catalog", while Dakota West Foss of Sputnikmusic called it her "strongest collection of songs to date". Robin Murray of Clash said the album surpassed expectations, calling it "a genuine thrill" and praising Blanco's "world-building capabilities". Both Alexis Petridis of The Guardian and Georgia Evans of NME criticized the album's lack of a clear identity, with the former finding the nature of its songs unmemorable.

Rob Sheffield of Rolling Stone praised the album for its diversity and versatility in genres and styles, describing the album as: "a valentine that delivers exactly what it promises—a pop icon and a superstar producer celebrating a real-life romance that we all can root for." In addition, Rolling Stone and Complex named the album as one of the best album of 2025 so far. For the album's tracks, Billboard named the song "Ojos Tristes" from the album as the tenth best Latin song of 2025 so far, writing: "This stunning reimagining of Jeanette's iconic 1981 hit, "Ojos Tristes" intertwines modern, nostalgic melodies with the enchanting vocals of Selena Gomez. This bilingual collaboration with Benny Blanco and The Marías — with frontwoman María Zardoya's distinctive, warm vocals providing harmonies — yields a lovely track that breathes new life into the original. Gomez's ethereal vocals soar throughout the song, beautifully complementing The Marías' signature sound".

== Commercial performance ==
In the United States, I Said I Love You First debuted at number two on the Billboard 200, with first-week sales of 120,000 album-equivalent units, consisting of 71,000 pure album sales and 64.04 million on-demand streams, making both Blanco and Gomez's highest first-week sales by units overall, as well as Gomez's seventh top-ten effort on the chart and Blanco's first. The album became top-selling pure sales album of the week, topping both the Top Album Sales and Top Vinyl Albums charts, it become the first album by a real-life couple to top the Vinyl Albums chart in history, as well as making Gomez's fourth consecutive number-one album on the charts and Blanco's first. In the same week, four songs from the album entered the Billboard Hot 100: "Call Me When You Break Up" (46), "Ojos Tristes" (56), "How Does It Feel to Be Forgotten" (71) and "Sunset Blvd" (97).

Internationally, the album debuted in the top ten in 15 countries, including Australia, Canada, and several European countries. In the United Kingdom, the album debuted at number four, earning Gomez her second top-five album in the country and the first for Blanco. 11 songs from the album make appearances on various official charts including Canada (8 songs), United Kingdom (4 songs), Ireland (3 songs), and 5 songs in the Billboard Global 200.

== Track listing ==
Standard edition
| No. | Title | Writer(s) | Producer(s) | Length |
|---|---|---|---|---|
| 1. | "I Said I Love You First" | Selena Gomez; Benjamin Levin; Finneas O'Connell | Benny Blanco^{[p]}; Finneas; Bart Schoudel^{[v]} | 0:44 |
| 2. | "Younger and Hotter Than Me" | Gomez; Levin; O'Connell | Blanco^{[p]}; Finneas; Schoudel^{[v]} | 3:09 |
| 3. | "Call Me When You Break Up" (with Gracie Abrams) | Gomez; Levin; Gracie Abrams; Justin Tranter; Julia Michaels; Magnus Høiberg; Dylan Brady; Mattias Larsson; Robin Fredriksson | Blanco^{[p]}; Cashmere Cat; Brady; Schoudel^{[v]}; Chris Sclafani^{[v]} | 2:06 |
| 4. | "Ojos Tristes" (with the Marías) | Gomez; Levin; Amanda Ibanez; María Zardoya; Ana Magdalena; Manuel Álvarez-Beigbeder Pérez; Josh Conway | Blanco^{[p]}; Conway^{[p]}; Zardoya; Schoudel^{[v]} | 3:21 |
| 5. | "Don't Wanna Cry" | Gomez; Levin; Blake Slatkin; Sébastien Akchoté-Bozović; Tranter; Jackson Shanks; John Sudduth; Høiberg | Blanco^{[p]}; Slatkin^{[p]}; Sebastian; Shanks; Schoudel^{[v]} | 3:27 |
| 6. | "Sunset Blvd" | Gomez; Levin; Tranter; Høiberg; Michael Pollack; Ibanez; Jeremy Malvin | Blanco^{[p]}; Chrome Sparks; Schoudel^{[v]} | 2:47 |
| 7. | "Cowboy" | Gomez; Levin; Høiberg; Ibanez; Jake Torrey | Blanco^{[p]}; Cashmere Cat; Schoudel^{[v]} | 3:04 |
| 8. | "Bluest Flame" | Gomez; Levin; Charlotte Aitchison; Høiberg; Brady | Blanco^{[p]}; Cashmere Cat; Brady; Schoudel^{[v]} | 2:42 |
| 9. | "How Does It Feel to Be Forgotten" | Gomez; Levin; Sudduth; Tranter; William Fly | Blanco^{[p]}; Schoudel^{[v]} | 2:41 |
| 10. | "Do You Wanna Be Perfect" | Gomez; Levin; Høiberg; Malvin | Blanco^{[p]}; Cashmere Cat; Chrome Sparks; Schoudel^{[v]} | 0:37 |
| 11. | "You Said You Were Sorry" | Gomez; Levin; Høiberg; Ibanez; Tranter; John Byron | Blanco^{[p]}; Cashmere Cat; Schoudel^{[v]} | 2:59 |
| 12. | "I Can't Get Enough" (with Tainy and J Balvin) | Gomez; Levin; Cristina Chiluiza; Jhay Cortez; Marco Masis; Mike Sabath; José Osorio | Blanco; Tainy | 2:37 |
| 13. | "Don't Take It Personally" | Gomez; Levin; Slatkin; Sudduth; Tranter | Blanco^{[p]}; Slatkin^{[p]}; Cashmere Cat^{[v]}; Schoudel^{[v]} | 2:34 |
| 14. | "Scared of Loving You" | Gomez; Levin; O'Connell | Blanco^{[p]}; Finneas; Schoudel^{[v]} | 1:50 |
| Total length: | | | | 34:38 |

... And You Said It Back edition
| No. | Title | Writer(s) | Producer(s) | Length |
|---|---|---|---|---|
| 15. | "That's When I'll Care" | Gomez; Levin; Tranter; Michaels; Ian Kirkpatrick | Blanco^{[p]}; Kirkpatrick; Schoudel^{[v]} | 3:04 |
| 16. | "Talk" | Gomez; Levin; Tranter; Sudduth; Kirkpatrick; John McCrea | Blanco^{[p]}; Kirkpatrick; Schoudel^{[v]} | 2:12 |
| 17. | "Stained" (performed by Selena Gomez) | Gomez; Michaels; Høiberg; Omelio | Cashmere Cat; Robopop | 3:29 |
| 18. | "Bluest Flame" (DJ Sliink remix) | Gomez; Levin; Aitchison; Høiberg; Brady | Blanco^{[p]}; Cashmere Cat; Brady; Schoudel^{[v]} | 2:44 |
| 19. | "How Does It Feel to Be Forgotten" (live from Vevo) | Gomez; Levin; Sudduth; Tranter; Fly | Blanco^{[p]}; Schoudel^{[v]} | 2:27 |
| 20. | "Call Me When You Break Up" (with Gracie Abrams; acoustic version) | Gomez; Levin; Abrams; Tranter; Michaels; Høiberg; Brady; Larsson; Fredriksson | Blanco; Casey Kalmenson | 2:50 |
| 21. | "Cowboy" (GloRilla remix) | Gomez; Levin; Gloria Woods; Høiberg; Ibanez; Torrey | Blanco^{[p]}; Cashmere Cat; Schoudel^{[v]} | 2:43 |
| 22. | "Guess You Could Say I'm in Love" | Gomez; Levin; Greg Gonzalez; Tranter; Høiberg | Blanco^{[p]}; Gonzalez; Cashmere Cat; Schoudel^{[v]} | 3:13 |

=== Notes ===
- ^{^[p]} signifies a primary and vocal producer
- ^{^[v]} signifies a vocal producer

== Personnel ==
Credits were adapted from album liner notes.

=== Musicians ===
- Selena Gomez – vocals
- Benny Blanco – keyboards, programming (all tracks); bass, guitar (3); vocals (10), background vocals (11)
- Finneas – background vocals, keyboards, piano, programming (tracks 1, 2, 14); glockenspiel, guitar, bass, synthesizer (2, 14)
- Dylan Day – guitar (tracks 2, 4, 6, 7, 9, 11, 13, 14)
- Lucy Healy – background vocals (tracks 2, 14)
- Justin Tranter – background vocals (tracks 3, 5, 6, 9, 11, 13), programming, keyboards (track 5)
- Cashmere Cat – keyboards, programming (tracks 3, 7, 8, 10); bass, guitar (3)
- Dylan Brady – keyboards, programming (tracks 3, 8)
- Julia Michaels – background vocals (track 3)
- Gracie Abrams – vocals (track 3)
- Pino Palladino – bass (tracks 4, 9, 11, 13)
- Henry Kwapis – drums (tracks 4, 9, 11, 13)
- Josh Conway – bass, guitar, programming (track 4)
- María Zardoya – vocals, programming (track 4)
- Jesse Perlman – guitar (track 4)
- Mikky Ekko – background vocals (tracks 5, 9, 13); keyboards, programming (5)
- Blake Slatkin – guitar, keyboards, programming (tracks 5, 13); background vocals (5)
- Sebastian – guitar, keyboards, programming (track 5)
- Jackson Shanks – guitar keyboards, programming (track 5)
- Kiddo – background vocals (tracks 6, 7, 11)
- Chrome Sparks – guitar, keyboards, programming (tracks 6, 10)
- Michael Pollack – background vocals, keyboards (track 6)
- GloRilla – background vocals (track 7)
- Jake Torrey – guitar (track 7)
- Charli XCX – background vocals (track 8)
- Phillip A. Peterson – cello, violin (tracks 9, 11, 13, 14); string arrangement (9, 11, 13, 14)
- William Fly – guitar (track 9)
- John Byron – guitar (track 11)
- Tainy – keyboards, programming (track 12)
- J Balvin – vocals (track 12)
- Chet Peterson – string arrangement (track 14)

=== Technical ===
- Benny Blanco – mixing (tracks 1–8, 10, 11, 13, 14); engineering, recording (all tracks)
- Chris Gehringer – mastering
- Cashmere Cat – mixing (track 5); engineering, recording (3, 7, 8, 10)
- Serban Ghenea – mixing (tracks 9, 12)
- Finneas – engineering (tracks 1, 2, 14), recording (2, 14)
- Dylan Brady – engineering (tracks 3, 8), recording (3)
- Josh Conway – engineering, recording (track 4)
- María Zardoya – engineering (track 4)
- Blake Slatkin – engineering (tracks 5, 13), recording (13)
- Jackson Shanks – engineering (track 5)
- Justin Tranter – engineering (track 5)
- Mikky Ekko – engineering (track 5)
- Sebastian – engineering (track 5)
- Chrome Sparks – engineering (tracks 6, 10), recording (10)
- Aron Forbes – recording (tracks 2, 14)
- Chris Sclafani – recording (track 3)
- Michael Harris – recording (tracks 4, 9, 11, 13)
- Bart Schoudel – recording (track 6)
- Phillip A. Peterson – recording (tracks 9, 11, 13, 14)
- Chet Peterson – recording (track 14)
- Will Quinnell – mastering assistance
- Bryce Bordone – mixing assistance (tracks 4, 9, 12)
- Andy Petr – recording assistance (tracks 4, 9, 11, 13)
- Ryan Tharayil – recording assistance (tracks 9, 11, 13)
- Ashlyn Banner – production coordination

== Charts ==
=== Weekly charts ===
Weekly chart performance for I Said I Love You First
| Chart (2025) | Peak position |
|---|---|
| Australian Albums (ARIA) | 5 |
| Austrian Albums (Ö3 Austria) | 5 |
| Belgian Albums (Ultratop Flanders) | 6 |
| Belgian Albums (Ultratop Wallonia) | 5 |
| Canadian Albums (Billboard) | 6 |
| Czech Albums (ČNS IFPI) | 30 |
| Danish Albums (Hitlisten) | 15 |
| Dutch Albums (Album Top 100) | 12 |
| Finnish Albums (Suomen virallinen lista) | 40 |
| French Albums (SNEP) | 12 |
| German Albums (Offizielle Top 100) | 2 |
| Greek Albums (IFPI) | 96 |
| Hungarian Albums (MAHASZ) | 12 |
| Icelandic Albums (Tónlistinn) | 32 |
| Irish Albums (Official Charts) | 4 |
| Italian Albums (FIMI) | 48 |
| Lithuanian Albums (AGATA) | 22 |
| New Zealand Albums (RMNZ) | 6 |
| Norwegian Albums (VG-lista) | 10 |
| Polish Albums (ZPAV) | 5 |
| Portuguese Albums (AFP) | 3 |
| Scottish Albums (Official Charts) | 3 |
| Slovak Albums (ČNS IFPI) | 21 |
| Spanish Albums (PROMUSICAE) | 5 |
| Swedish Albums (Sverigetopplistan) | 45 |
| Swiss Albums (Schweizer Hitparade) | 6 |
| UK Albums (Official Charts) | 4 |
| US Billboard 200 | 2 |

=== Year-end charts ===
Year-end chart performance for I Said I Love You First
| Chart (2025) | Position |
|---|---|
| US Billboard 200 | 190 |

== Release history ==
| Date | Region | Edition | Format(s) | Label | Ref. |
|---|---|---|---|---|---|
| March 21, 2025 | Various | Standard | Digital download; streaming; CD; vinyl LP | SMG; Friends Keep Secrets; Interscope | |
| March 28, 2025 | Various | I Said I Love You First... | Digital download; streaming | SMG; Friends Keep Secrets; Interscope | |
| May 2, 2025 | Various | I Said I Love You First... And You Said It Back | Digital download; streaming | SMG; Friends Keep Secrets; Interscope | |
| June 27, 2025 | Japan | I Said I Love You First... And You Said It Back | CD | SMG; Friends Keep Secrets; Interscope | |

== See also ==
- List of 2025 albums
- List of Top Album Sales number ones of the 2020s
