= Bluest Flame =

Song by Selena Gomez and Benny Blanco

from the album I Said I Love You First
- Released: March 21, 2025
- Studio: 555 Studios (Los Angeles, California); Doheny Studios (West Hollywood, California)
- Genre: Dance-pop; hyperpop
- Length: 2:42
- Label: SMG Music LLC; Friends Keep Secrets; Interscope
- Songwriters: Selena Gomez; Benjamin Levin; Charlotte Aitchison; Magnus Høiberg; Dylan Brady
- Producers: Benny Blanco; Cashmere Cat; Dylan Brady; Bart Schoudel

Lyric video
- "Bluest Flame" on YouTube

"Bluest Flame" is a song by American singer Selena Gomez and American record producer Benny Blanco. It appears on Gomez and Blanco's 2025 collaborative studio album, I Said I Love You First. The song was written by Gomez, Blanco, Charli XCX, Cashmere Cat, and Dylan Brady, and produced by Blanco, Cashmere Cat, Brady and Bart Schoudel. An official remix of "Bluest Flame" by DJ Sliink appears on the album's deluxe edition. "Bluest Flame" received a nomination for Best Dance Pop Recording at the 68th Annual Grammy Awards, becoming Gomez's third nomination and Blanco’s twelfth nomination.

== Background ==
In the narrated edition of Gomez and Blanco's album, I Said I Love You First, made available through Gomez's official store on March 23, 2025, Gomez explained that "Bluest Flame" came together with Charli XCX, whom she praised as "the coolest", following their earlier work with Benny Blanco on "Same Old Love", and characterized the track as a spontaneous, upbeat song meant to "put on and dance".

== Critical reception ==
Jason Lipshutz of Billboard ranked "Bluest Flame" as the album's best track, calling it "a celebration, and a triumphant one at that", noting Charli XCX's imprint in its "propulsive thump" and "use of repetition", while praising Gomez for "injecting a romantic swoon" into the contorted verse vocals. Critics highlighted the song's hyperpop-leaning energy: Dakota West Foss of Sputnikmusic praised its leap "from robot a cappella to an explosion of hyperpop goodness", and Rob Sheffield of Rolling Stone called it a "fantastic disco reunion" that plays like a Brat-style "wedding toast".

== Accolades ==
Awards and nominations for "Bluest Flame"
| Organization | Year | Category | Result | Ref. |
|---|---|---|---|---|
| Nickelodeon Kids' Choice Awards | 2025 | Favorite Viral Song | Won | |
| Grammy Awards | 2026 | Best Dance Pop Recording | Nominated | |

== Charts ==
=== Weekly charts ===
Weekly chart performance for "Bluest Flame"
| Chart (2025) | Peak position |
|---|---|
| Canada Hot 100 (Billboard) | 92 |
| Ireland (IRMA) | 17 |
| New Zealand Hot Singles (RMNZ) | 13 |
| UK Singles (Official Charts) | 47 |
| US Bubbling Under Hot 100 (Billboard) | 7 |
| US Hot Dance/Pop Songs (Billboard) | 4 |

=== Year-end charts ===
Year-end chart performance for "Bluest Flame"
| Chart (2025) | Position |
|---|---|
| US Hot Dance/Pop Songs (Billboard) | 22 |

== Release history ==
Release dates and formats for "Bluest Flame"
| Region | Date | Format | Version | Label | Ref. |
|---|---|---|---|---|---|
| Various | March 21, 2025 | Digital download; streaming | Original | SMG Music; Friends Keep Secrets; Interscope | |
| Various | May 2, 2025 | Digital download; streaming | DJ Sliink remix | SMG Music; Friends Keep Secrets; Interscope | |
