= Hermoso (album) =

Studio album by Benny Blanco
- Released: August 14, 2026
- Genre: Latin
- Length: 16:55
- Language: Spanish (Note: "Memoria de Paz" includes lyrics in English)
- Label: Friends Keep Secrets
- Producers: Benny Blanco; Cashmere Cat; Josh Conway; María Zardoya; Ovy on the Drums; Blake Slatkin

Benny Blanco chronology
| I Said I Love You First (2025) | Hermoso (2026) |

Hermoso (Spanish for Beautiful) is the second solo studio album by the American producer and songwriter Benny Blanco. It was released on August 14, 2026, through Friends Keep Secrets, Blanco's imprint of Interscope Records. It is his first solo album since Friends Keep Secrets (2018), and also follows up his collaborative album with wife Selena Gomez, I Said I Love You First (2025). Guests on the album include Gomez, Becky G, the Marías, and BB Trickz.

Hermoso generated controversy due to its title, concept, and cover art, spurring accusations of cultural appropriation. Criticism of the cover art centered on Blanco's exaggerated, caricature-like mask, which some deemed to be racist. Others defended the concept, noting Blanco's longstanding appreciation for Latino music, and his outspokenness on political issues affecting the community.

== Track listing ==
Hermoso track listing
| No. | Title | Writer(s) | Producer(s) | Length |
|---|---|---|---|---|
| 1. | "Un Poco Perdido" (with Netón Vega) | Benjamin Levin; Magnus August Høiberg; Luis Ernesto Vega Carvajal; Cristian Nava | Benny Blanco; Cashmere Cat | 2:51 |
| 2. | "Te Olvido (La La)" (with Selena Gomez and Becky G) | Levin; Selena Gomez; Høiberg; Kevyn Mauricio Cruz Moreno; Rebbeca Marie Gomez; Nathaniel Campany; Sara Schell | Benny Blanco; Cashmere Cat; Bart Schoudel^{[a]}; Carlos A. Molina^{[a]} | 2:30 |
| 3. | "Joven y Salvaje" (with BB Trickz) | Levin; Høiberg; Belize Kazi; Sofi Michelle Rosario Iazala; Lucas Sirera Sorondo | Benny Blanco; Cashmere Cat | 2:02 |
| 4. | "Memoria de Paz" (featuring the Marías) | Levin; Høiberg; Josh Conway; María Zardoya | Benny Blanco; Cashmere Cat; Conway; Zardoya | 3:42 |
| 5. | "Te Amo" | Levin; Høiberg | Benny Blanco; Cashmere Cat | 0:41 |
| 6. | "Ay Bendito" (with Mora and Ovy on the Drums) | Levin; Høiberg; Daniel Echavarria Oviedo; Gabriel Mora; Cruz | Benny Blanco; Cashmere Cat; Ovy on the Drums | 2:54 |
| 7. | "Cinco" | Levin; Høiberg | Benny Blanco; Cashmere Cat | 0:05 |
| 8. | "Degenere" (Myke Towers featuring Benny Blanco) | Levin; Høiberg; Michael Torres Monge; Blake Slatkin; Orlando J. Cepeda Matos; Julio Emmanuel Batista Santos; Suzanne Vega | Benny Blanco; Cashmere Cat; Slatkin | 2:10 |
| Total length: | | | | 16:55 |

=== Notes ===
- "Degenere" is stylized in all caps.
- ^{^[a]} signifies a vocal producer

== Personnel ==
Credits adapted from Tidal.

=== Musicians ===
- Benny Blanco – keyboards, programming (all tracks); bass (track 8)
- Cashmere Cat – keyboards, programming (all tracks); bass (8)
- Ismael Pineda – percussion (1, 2, 6)
- Joey Calderón – trombone (1, 2, 6)
- Hector Perez Jarquin – accordion (1)
- Leonardo Gama – guitar (1)
- Jose A. Leyva – upright bass (1)
- Netón Vega – vocals (1)
- Ricardo Barajas – electric guitar (2)
- Guillermo Alexi Medina Poblano – upright bass (2)
- Selena Gomez – vocals (2)
- Becky G – vocals (2)
- BB Trickz – vocals (3)
- Josh Conway – drums, guitar, keyboards, programming (4)
- María Zardoya – vocals, programming (4)
- Jesse Perlman – guitar (4)
- Dylan Day – guitar (6)
- Ovy on the Drums – programming (6)
- Mora – vocals (6)
- Blake Slatkin – keyboards, programming (8)
- Myke Towers – vocals (8)
- Suzanne Vega – vocals (8)

=== Technical ===
- Benny Blanco – engineering (all tracks), mixing (1, 3–7), recording arrangement (1, 6)
- Cashmere Cat – engineering (all tracks), mixing (1, 3–7), recording arrangement (1)
- Edgar Rodriguez – engineering (1, 2, 6), recording arrangement (1, 2, 6)
- Carlos A. Molina – engineering (2)
- Bryce Bordone – engineering (2)
- Josh Conway – engineering (4)
- Julio Batista – engineering, mixing (8)
- Blake Slatkin – engineering (8)
- José Francisco – engineering assistance (1, 6)
- David Herrera – engineering assistance (1)
- Jackson Dale – engineering assistance (4)
- Ryan Tharayil – engineering assistance (4)
- Serban Ghenea – mixing (2)
- Josh Gudwin – mixing (8)
- Chris Gehringer – mastering (1–7)
- Roberto "Mr Earcandy" Vazquez – mastering (8)
- Ashlyn Banner – production coordination
