= Ojos Tristes =

2025 song by Selena Gomez, Benny Blanco and the Marías

Single by Selena Gomez, Benny Blanco and the Marías

from the album I Said I Love You First
- Released: April 28, 2025
- Studio: 555 Studios (Los Angeles, California); Doheny Studios (West Hollywood, California); Valentine Recording Studios (Valley Village, California); Kwap Studio (Los Angeles, California)
- Genre: Dream pop; indie pop
- Length: 3:21
- Label: SMG Music; Friends Keep Secrets; Interscope
- Songwriters: Selena Gomez; Benjamin Levin; María Zardoya; Josh Conway; Amanda Ibanez; Ana Magdalena; Manuel Álvarez-Beigbeder Pérez
- Producers: Benny Blanco; María Zardoya; Josh Conway

Selena Gomez singles chronology
"Sunset Blvd" (2025)	"Ojos Tristes" (2025)	"In the Dark" (2025)

Benny Blanco singles chronology
"Sunset Blvd" (2025)	"Ojos Tristes" (2025)	"Joven y Salvaje" (2026)

The Marías singles chronology
"Back to Me" (2025)	"Ojos Tristes" (2025)	"All I Did Was Dream of You" (2026)

Lyric video
- "Ojos Tristes" on YouTube

"Ojos Tristes" (English: "Sad Eyes") is a song by American singer Selena Gomez, American record producer Benny Blanco, and American band the Marías. It appears as the fourth track on Gomez and Blanco's collaborative studio album, I Said I Love You First. The song was written by Gomez, Benjamin Levin, María Zardoya, Manuel Álvarez-Beigbeder Pérez, and Josh Conway, and produced by Benny Blanco, Josh Conway, María Zardoya and Bart Schoudel. In April 2025, the song was serviced to Spanish contemporary hit radio in the United States as the record's third single. "Ojos Tristes" interpolates the song "El muchacho de los ojos tristes" by English-born Spanish singer Jeanette. The track became the first-ever number-one song on Hot Latin Pop Songs chart.

== Background ==
In the narrated edition of Gomez and Blanco's album, I Said I Love You First, made available through Gomez's official store on March 23, 2025, the singer recounted that the collaboration with the Marías originated from a date with Benny Blanco, where they attended an outdoor concert by the band. She described being "mesmerized" by the performance and praised the vocalist María Zardoya's artistry. She added that she had been aiming to include a Spanish-language song on each of her albums and felt that Zardoya's tone was a perfect fit for the track. Gomez concluded by expressing how honored she was to have Zardoya featured on the song.

== Composition and lyrical interpretation ==
"Ojos Tristes" has been described as a glam pop and indie pop track that blends nostalgic 1980s influences with modern production. The song interpolates Jeanette’s 1981 "El muchacho de los ojos tristes", originally written and produced by Manuel Alejandro, notably incorporating its chorus while altering the narrative in the verses. While Jeanette's version centers on a lonely man in need of love and comfort, "Ojos Tristes" reimagines the theme through the perspective of an "unwanted breakup". The track features bilingual lyrics, with an added English verse performed by Gomez and a second Spanish verse by María Zardoya of The Marías, offering a different viewpoint and evoking the passage of time.

Jeanette responded positively to the reinterpretation. When asked about the song by Rolling Stone, she commented:

"At first, I was like, 'What is this?' But once I listened to all of it, I thought it was beautifully done. It’s a classic cover but [Gomez] has added a modern twist to it while respecting the essence of the original song."

== Commercial performance ==
"Ojos Tristes" debuted at number 59 on the Billboard Hot 100, and peaked at number 56 the following week. On the US Billboard Hot Latin Songs chart, the song entered at number four on the issue dated April 5, 2025, with 1,000 downloads sold and 8.2 million streams in its first week, peaking at number three the following week. The single marked Benny Blanco and The Marías' first top ten entry on the Hot Latin Songs chart, while it became Gomez's fifth, following her 2021 collaboration "Selfish Love" with DJ Snake. The track also topped the then-recently created Hot Latin Pop Songs chart, becoming the first number-one song in the chart's history.

== Live performances ==
The Marías performed "Ojos Tristes" live for the first time at the 2025 Coachella Valley Music and Arts Festival, held on April 11.

== Accolades ==
Awards and nominations for "Ojos Tristes"
Organization	Year	Category	Result	Ref.
American Music Awards	2026	Best Latin Song	Nominated	
ASCAP Latin Music Awards	2026	Winning Songwriters & Publishers	Won	
Billboard Latin Music Awards	2025	Latin Pop Song of the Year	Nominated	
Premios Juventud	2025	Colaboración OMG	Won	
Ritmo Latino Entertainment Awards	2025	Favorite Song of the Year	Nominated	
Ritmo Latino Entertainment Awards	2025	Favorite Single of the Year	Nominated	

== Charts ==
=== Weekly charts ===
Weekly chart performance for "Ojos Tristes"
Chart (2025)	Peak position
Bolivia (Billboard)	23
Canada Hot 100 (Billboard)	83
Central America Anglo Airplay (Monitor Latino)	2
Chile Anglo Airplay (Monitor Latino)	4
Costa Rica Airplay (FONOTICA)	10
Costa Rica Airplay (Monitor Latino)	5
Dominican Republic Anglo Airplay (Monitor Latino)	12
Ecuador Anglo Airplay (Monitor Latino)	2
El Salvador Anglo Airplay (Monitor Latino)	1
Global 200 (Billboard)	51
Greece International Streaming (IFPI)	50
Guatemala Anglo Airplay (Monitor Latino)	8
Honduras Anglo Airplay (Monitor Latino)	2
Israel International Airplay (Media Forest)	3
Latin America Anglo Airplay (Monitor Latino)	5
Lebanon (Lebanese Top 20)	19
Malaysia International Streaming (RIM)	15
Mexico Anglo Airplay (Monitor Latino)	5
New Zealand Hot Singles (RMNZ)	12
Nicaragua Anglo Airplay (Monitor Latino)	5
Panama Anglo Airplay (Monitor Latino)	9
Paraguay Anglo Airplay (Monitor Latino)	12
Peru Anglo Airplay (Monitor Latino)	5
Puerto Rico Airplay (Monitor Latino)	5
Turkey International Airplay (Radiomonitor Türkiye)	5
US Billboard Hot 100	56
US Hot Latin Songs (Billboard)	3
US Hot Latin Pop Songs (Billboard)	1
US Latin Airplay (Billboard)	1
US Latin Pop Airplay (Billboard)	1
Venezuela Anglo Airplay (Monitor Latino)	14
Vietnam (IFPI)	17

=== Year-end charts ===
Year-end chart performance for "Ojos Tristes"
Chart (2025)	Position
US Hot Latin Songs (Billboard)	22

== Certifications ==
Certifications for "Ojos Tristes"
Region	Certification	Certified units/sales
Brazil (Pro-Música Brasil)	Platinum	40,000^{‡}
^{‡} Sales+streaming figures based on certification alone.

== Release history ==
Release dates and formats for "Ojos Tristes"
Region	Date	Format	Label	Ref.
Various	March 21, 2025	Digital download; streaming	SMG Music; Friends Keep Secrets; Interscope	

== See also ==
- List of Billboard number-one Latin pop songs of 2025
