= Sunset Blvd (Selena Gomez and Benny Blanco song) =

Single by Selena Gomez and Benny Blanco

from the album I Said I Love You First
- B-side: "See You Soon (Exclusive voice memo)"
- Released: March 14, 2025
- Studio: 555 Studios (Los Angeles, CA); Doheny Studios (West Hollywood, CA)
- Genre: Synth-pop; ambient pop; dream pop
- Length: 2:47
- Label: SMG Music LLC; Friends Keep Secrets; Interscope
- Songwriters: Selena Gomez; Benjamin Levin; Michael Pollack; Amanda Ibanez; Justin Tranter; Magnus Høiberg; Jeremy Malvin
- Producer: Benny Blanco

Selena Gomez singles chronology
"Call Me When You Break Up" (2025)	"Sunset Blvd" (2025)	"Ojos Tristes" (2025)

Benny Blanco singles chronology
"Call Me When You Break Up" (2025)	"Sunset Blvd" (2025)	"Ojos Tristes" (2025)

Music video
- "Sunset Blvd" on YouTube

"Sunset Blvd" is a song by American singer Selena Gomez and American record producer Benny Blanco, released as the second single from their collaborative studio album, I Said I Love You First. Gomez and Blanco wrote the track with Justin Tranter, Cashmere Cat, Michael Pollack, Amanda Ibanez, and Jeremy Malvin. Blanco also produced the song along with Chrome Sparks and Bart Schoudel. SMG Music LLC, Friends Keep Secrets and Interscope Records initially released the song for download and streaming on March 14, 2025. It was released to Italian radio on July 31, 2025.

== Background and release ==
In February 2025, Gomez and Blanco announced their collaboration project, I Said I Love You First. They released the lead single, "Call Me When You Break Up", on February 20, and later hinted at another song dropping before the album's release. On March 4, they unveiled the official track list on social media. A week later, on March 11, they announced the release of their new song, "Sunset Blvd".

== Composition ==
Described as a synth-pop, ambient pop and dream pop number, "Sunset Blvd" was inspired by Gomez and Blanco's first date on the eponymous street in Los Angeles. During the bridge, Gomez delivers a half-whispered spoken word breakdown.

== Music video ==
On March 14, 2025, "Sunset Blvd" was released for download and streaming, accompanied by its official music video, directed by Petra Collins. Gomez drew inspiration from cult classics, channeling a full '80s vixen aesthetic in the video. Her hair and makeup paid homage to Francis Ford Coppola's 1982 film, One from the Heart, which he praised.

== Charts ==
Chart performance for "Sunset Blvd"
Chart (2025)	Peak position
Canada Hot 100 (Billboard)	79
Costa Rica Anglo Airplay (Monitor Latino)	8
El Salvador Anglo Airplay (Monitor Latino)	2
Global 200 (Billboard)	123
Guatemala Anglo Airplay (Monitor Latino)	6
Italy Airplay (EarOne)	7
New Zealand Hot Singles (RMNZ)	15
Portugal (AFP)	163
San Marino Airplay (SMRTV Top 50)	7
UK Singles (Official Charts)	100
US Billboard Hot 100	97

== Certifications ==
Certifications for "Sunset Blvd"
Region	Certification	Certified units/sales
Brazil (Pro-Música Brasil)	Gold	20,000^{‡}
^{‡} Sales+streaming figures based on certification alone.

== Release history ==
Release dates and formats for "Sunset Blvd"
Region	Date	Format	Label	Ref.
Various	March 14, 2025	Digital download; streaming	SMG Music LLC; Friends Keep Secrets; Interscope	
United States	March 20, 2025	7-inch vinyl	SMG Music LLC; Friends Keep Secrets; Interscope	
Italy	July 31, 2025	Radio airplay	EMI	
