= Wolves (Selena Gomez and Marshmello song) =

2017 single by Selena Gomez and Marshmello

Single by Selena Gomez and Marshmello
- Released: October 25, 2017
- Recorded: 2016
- Studio: Interscope Studios (Santa Monica, CA)
- Genre: EDM
- Length: 3:17
- Label: Interscope
- Songwriters: Selena Gomez; Christopher Comstock; Andrew Watt; Ali Tamposi; Brian Lee; Louis Bell
- Producers: Marshmello; Andrew Watt

Selena Gomez singles chronology
"Fetish" (2017)	"Wolves" (2017)	"Back to You" (2018)

Marshmello singles chronology
"You & Me" (2017)	"Wolves" (2017)	"Spotlight" (2018)

Music video
- "Wolves" on YouTube

"Wolves" is a song by American singer Selena Gomez and American music producer Marshmello. The song was written by Gomez, Ali Tamposi, Louis Bell, Brian Lee, and its producers Marshmello and Andrew Watt. The song was released by Interscope Records on October 25, 2017.

Commercially, the song has topped the charts in Latvia and Poland while reaching the top 10 in 23 additional countries; as well as the top 20 in Germany and the United States. It was also the second-most successful electronic song of 2018 in the US. The single is certified Platinum or higher in fifteen countries worldwide, including Diamond in Brazil and France.

== Release and promotion ==
The release is believed to have initially been for Rita Ora as the lead single off Phoenix. Marshmello first revealed the song on July 22, 2017, when he tweeted: "Happy birthday Selena Gomez! Can't wait for the world to hear what we've been working on." On August 15, 2017, Marshmello wrote that Gomez "sounds absolutely incredible" on the song, when replying to a fan who asked him about the collaboration. During a radio interview with Tonya and Sonic on San Diego's Energy 103.7 FM, Gomez said: "It's really cool. It's kind of in that world, his world, and I'm stepping into it and bringing my style too." She called it a beautiful song and one of her favorites. On September 25, 2017, a follower of Gomez reached out to Marshmello via Twitter for a "tip" about the song, to which Marshmello replied: "Coming very very soon," leading to speculation on the song's release. On October 6, 2017, Marshmello reassured fans that the song is "coming very soon".

On October 19, 2017, both Gomez and Marshmello took to social media to officially announce the song and its release date. Gomez shared pictures of her wearing a pink version of Marshmello's helmet, another photo shows the two sitting on a couch eating popcorn. The song premiered via the radio show Beats 1, the host Zane Lowe named it the day's "World Record".

== Composition ==
"Wolves" was written by Selena Gomez, Marshmello, Ali Tamposi, Andrew Watt, Brian Lee, and Louis Bell. The song was described as a "sticky electronic snack" and "propulsive EDM" which is equally "acoustic-laced EDM and long, lost 80's pop". Caitlin Kelley from Billboard noted how Marshmello's influence in the song can be heard through "subtle trap elements, like the triple high hats buzzing beneath the smoky atmosphere." "Wolves" opens "dark and gloomy" with Gomez singing over a clean electric guitar as Kat Bein from Billboard commented, the build of the bridge is "almost country-pop, but the choral hook is all Marshmello sweetness." In an interview with Zane Lowe for Beats 1, Gomez stated that the lyrics deeply reflect what she was feeling during the period she recorded the track.

== Music video ==
On November 2, 2017, Gomez released the vertical video for the single exclusively through Spotify. It was later released via her official Vevo account. The video is a FaceTime between Gomez and Marshmello.

On November 17, 2017, the official video premiered on the iTunes Store and Apple Music and it was directed by Colin Tilley. The video features Gomez wearing different outfits in various parts of an indoor swimming pool facility. Near the end of the video, Gomez walks on the water of the swimming pool. The video was released on Vevo and YouTube a day later, on November 18, 2017, on Gomez's account.

== Commercial performance ==
"Wolves" entered at number 16 on the UK Singles Chart. Three weeks later, it ascended to number nine and became Gomez's fourth top 10 entry in the nation. In Australia, the song entered at number 15 on the ARIA Singles Chart. It has reached number five there and is her second-highest-peaking song in the country behind another EDM collaboration, "It Ain't Me". After debuting at number 69 on the Canadian Hot 100, it rose to number nine the following week and has been certified six-times Platinum by Music Canada (MC) for accumulating 480,000 equivalent units. The song was certified quadruple Platinum by the RIAA for accumulating four million equivalent units.

== Live performances ==
On November 19, 2017, Gomez and Marshmello performed "Wolves" live for the first time at the 2017 American Music Awards. On May 29, 2021, Gomez and Marshmello performed the song at the 2021 UEFA Champions League Final.

== Track listing ==
- Digital download
1. "Wolves" – 3:17
- Digital download – Total Ape remix
1. "Wolves" (Total Ape remix) – 3:05
- Digital download – Sneek remix
1. "Wolves" (Sneek remix) – 4:34
- Digital download – Said the Sky remix
1. "Wolves" (Said the Sky remix) – 3:28
- Digital download – Rusko remix
1. "Wolves" (Rusko remix) – 3:46
- Digital download – Owen Norton remix
1. "Wolves" (Owen Norton remix) – 4:28
- Digital download – MOTi remix
1. "Wolves" (MOTi remix) – 4:05

== Credits and personnel ==
Credits and personnel adapted from Rare album liner notes.

- Selena Gomez – lead vocals, songwriting
- Marshmello – production, songwriting
- Andrew Watt – production, songwriting
- Louis Bell – vocal engineering, songwriting
- Ali Tamposi – songwriting
- Brian D. Lee – songwriting
- Benjamin Rice – engineering
- Serban Ghenea – mixing
- John Hanes – mix engineering
- Chris Gehringer – mastering

== Charts ==
=== Weekly charts ===
Chart (2017–2018)	Peak position
Argentina Anglo (Monitor Latino)	9
Australia (ARIA)	5
Austria (Ö3 Austria Top 40)	8
Belgium (Ultratop 50 Flanders)	7
Belgium (Ultratop 50 Wallonia)	7
Brazil (Crowley Charts)	89
Canada Hot 100 (Billboard)	7
Canada CHR/Top 40 (Billboard)	2
Canada Hot AC (Billboard)	10
CIS Airplay (TopHit)	88
Colombia (National-Report)	57
Croatia International Airplay (Top lista)	9
Czech Republic Airplay (ČNS IFPI)	5
Czech Republic Singles Digital (ČNS IFPI)	2
Denmark (Tracklisten)	8
Dominican Republic Anglo (Monitor Latino)	2
Ecuador Anglo (Monitor Latino)	4
El Salvador (Monitor Latino)	12
Finland (Suomen virallinen lista)	3
France (SNEP)	30
Germany (GfK)	11
Greece Digital (Billboard)	5
Greece International (IFPI)	4
Guatemala Anglo (Monitor Latino)	5
Hungary (Dance Top 40)	28
Hungary (Rádiós Top 40)	1
Hungary (Single Top 40)	5
Hungary (Stream Top 40)	1
Ireland (IRMA)	5
Italy (FIMI)	28
Japan (Japan Hot 100)	40
Latvia (DigiTop100)	2
Lebanon Airplay (Lebanese Top 20)	2
Malaysia (RIM)	3
Mexico (Mexico Airplay)	13
Mexico Ingles Airplay (Billboard)	1
Netherlands (Dutch Top 40)	2
Netherlands (Single Top 100)	8
New Zealand (Recorded Music NZ)	10
Nicaragua (Monitor Latino)	16
Norway (VG-lista)	5
Panama Anglo (Monitor Latino)	8
Philippines (Philippine Hot 100)	34
Poland Airplay (ZPAV)	1
Portugal (AFP)	7
Russia Airplay (TopHit)	78
Scottish Singles Sales (Official Charts)	5
Slovakia Singles Digital (ČNS IFPI)	4
Slovakia Airplay (ČNS IFPI)	8
Slovenia (SloTop50)	9
Spain (Promusicae)	27
Sweden (Sverigetopplistan)	7
Switzerland (Schweizer Hitparade)	9
UK Singles (Official Charts)	9
UK Dance (Official Charts)	2
US Billboard Hot 100	20
US Adult Pop Airplay (Billboard)	22
US Dance Club Songs (Billboard)	12
US Hot Dance/Electronic Songs (Billboard)	1
US Pop Airplay (Billboard)	6
US Rhythmic Airplay (Billboard)	33
Venezuela (National-Report)	35

=== Monthly charts ===
Chart (2017)	Peak position
Brazil Streaming (Pro-Música)	17

=== Year-end charts ===
Chart (2017)	Position
Netherlands (Dutch Top 40)	60
Hungary (Single Top 40)	91
Hungary (Stream Top 40)	48
Latvia Airplay (LaIPA)	85
Portugal (AFP)	94
US Hot Dance/Electronic Songs (Billboard)	41
Chart (2018)	Position
Australia (ARIA)	46
Austria (Ö3 Austria Top 40)	75
Belgium (Ultratop Flanders)	36
Belgium (Ultratop Wallonia)	33
Canada (Canadian Hot 100)	27
Denmark (Tracklisten)	81
France (SNEP)	118
Germany (Official German Charts)	71
Hungary (Dance Top 40)	93
Hungary (Rádiós Top 40)	3
Hungary (Single Top 40)	46
Netherlands (Dutch Top 40)	50
Poland (ZPAV)	44
Portugal (AFP)	61
Slovenia (SloTop50)	17
Sweden (Sverigetopplistan)	79
Switzerland (Schweizer Hitparade)	52
US Billboard Hot 100	60
US Hot Dance/Electronic Songs (Billboard)	2
US Mainstream Top 40 (Billboard)	25
Chart (2019)	Position
Hungary (Rádiós Top 40)	86
Chart (2023)	Position
Hungary (Rádiós Top 40)	94
Chart (2024)	Position
Hungary (Rádiós Top 40)	39
Chart (2025)	Position
Hungary (Rádiós Top 40)	58

=== Decade-end charts ===
Chart (2010–2019)	Position
US Hot Dance/Electronic Songs (Billboard)	16

== Certifications ==
Certifications for "Wolves"
Region	Certification	Certified units/sales
Australia (ARIA)	7× Platinum	490,000^{‡}
Austria (IFPI Austria)	Platinum	30,000^{‡}
Belgium (BRMA)	Platinum	20,000^{‡}
Brazil (Pro-Música Brasil)	2× Diamond	500,000^{‡}
Canada (Music Canada)	6× Platinum	480,000^{‡}
Denmark (IFPI Danmark)	Platinum	90,000^{‡}
France (SNEP)	Diamond	333,333^{‡}
Germany (BVMI)	Platinum	400,000^{‡}
Italy (FIMI)	Platinum	50,000^{‡}
Mexico (AMPROFON)	3× Platinum	180,000^{‡}
New Zealand (RMNZ)	3× Platinum	90,000^{‡}
Norway (IFPI Norway)	3× Platinum	180,000^{‡}
Poland (ZPAV)	3× Platinum	150,000^{‡}
Portugal (AFP)	2× Platinum	20,000^{‡}
Spain (Promusicae)	2× Platinum	120,000^{‡}
United Kingdom (BPI)	Platinum	600,000^{‡}
United States (RIAA)	4× Platinum	4,000,000^{‡}
Streaming
Japan (RIAJ)	Gold	50,000,000^{†}
Sweden (GLF)	2× Platinum	16,000,000^{†}
^{‡} Sales+streaming figures based on certification alone.^{†} Streaming-only figures based on certification alone.

== Release history ==
Region	Date	Format	Version	Label	Ref.
Various	October 25, 2017	Digital download; streaming	Original	Interscope	
United States	November 7, 2017	Contemporary hit radio	Original	Interscope	
United States	November 21, 2017	Rhythmic contemporary radio	Original	Interscope	
Various	February 23, 2018	Digital download	MOTi remix	Interscope	
Various	February 23, 2018	Digital download	Owen Norton remix	Interscope	
Various	February 23, 2018	Digital download	Rusko remix	Interscope	
Various	February 23, 2018	Digital download	Said the Sky remix	Interscope	
Various	February 23, 2018	Digital download	Sneek remix	Interscope	
Various	February 23, 2018	Digital download	Total Ape remix	Interscope	
