= In the Dark (Selena Gomez song) =

Single by Selena Gomez

from the album Nobody Wants This (Soundtrack from the Netflix Series)
- Released: October 23, 2025
- Genre: Dance
- Length: 3:05
- Label: SMG
- Songwriters: Ali Tamposi; Andrew Watt; Henry Walter; Justin Tranter; Louis Bell; Selena Gomez
- Producers: Andrew Watt; Cirkut; Louis Bell

Selena Gomez singles chronology
"Ojos Tristes" (2025)	"In the Dark" (2025)	"Te Olvido (La La)" (2026)

Music video
- "In the Dark" on YouTube

"In the Dark" is a song by the American singer-songwriter Selena Gomez. It was released along with an accompanying music video on October 23, 2025, through SMG Music, under exclusive license to Interscope Records. The song coincided with the premiere of the second season of the Netflix series, Nobody Wants This. While tied to the series' release, the song was not written specifically for it. It was sent to Italian radio station on November 14.

"In the Dark" is an upbeat dance song exploring themes of devotion and emotional vulnerability. Its music video, directed by Luke Orlando, features minimalist visuals and retro-inspired imagery reminiscent of Gomez's Revival era.

== Background and release ==
In November 2025, Gomez released the single "In the Dark" alongside its music video to accompany the second season of the Netflix series Nobody Wants This. Although initially associated with Nobody Wants This, "In the Dark" was not written for the show. Ahead of the release, Gomez shared behind-the-scenes footage from the video shoot, saying: "I'm not sure if anyone has heard of this really cool, popular show, Nobody Wants This, on Netflix. I'm shooting a music video for my little part. I'm proud and happy, and we're bringing a vibe." In the clip, she is seen filming inside a photo studio, posing in multiple outfits and in front of colorful backdrops as a high-tech camera follows her. "We're making it really fun, edgy, and cool, which is what I envision the song to feel like", she added, calling it "probably the shortest video I've ever done."

Series creator and executive producer Craig Foster told Rolling Stone that "In the Dark" captured "the universal feeling of fighting for your relationship even when everything feels uncertain", and explained that the song underscored a pivotal scene in the season finale. Simon Tikhman, CEO and co-founder of the Core Entertainment, added that Gomez had planned to release the track earlier but decided to reserve it for the series because of its personal significance. Following its release, Gomez posted a snippet of the track on Instagram. On her Instagram Stories, she shared several screenshots from the music video, noting that she "thought it would be fun to add a little revival to it", referencing her 2015 album of the same name.

== Composition ==
"In the Dark" is an upbeat dance song, exploring themes of devotion and emotional vulnerability. "In the Dark" opens the final episode of the season and incorporates elements reminiscent of early 2010s electronic pop, drawing comparisons to the darker, synth-driven sound that characterized much of that era's mainstream music.

== Music video and controversy ==
Gomez in a scene from the "In the Dark" music video, which later circulated online following its release.

The music video for "In the Dark," directed by Luke Orlando, features Gomez performing in a series of minimalist and atmospheric settings. It opens with Gomez wearing a black leotard while sitting on a white chaise, before transitioning to darker scenes that show her in a two-piece outfit and a glossy leather jacket surrounded by smoke. It also incorporates retro-inspired imagery and subdued lighting to match the song's themes of devotion and self-acceptance. Following its release, viewers noted stylistic similarities to Gomez's Revival-era visuals.

After the video's release, Canadian singer Grimes publicly defended Gomez after a series of stills from the video went viral and sparked online criticism of Gomez's appearance. Grimes described the comments as "high school level bullying", calling the viral images "misrepresentative" and stating that Gomez "looks extremely beautiful" in the full video.

== Charts ==
=== Weekly charts ===
Weekly chart performance
Chart (2025–2026)	Peak position
Central America Anglo Airplay (Monitor Latino)	14
Croatia International Airplay (Top lista)	66
Ecuador Anglo Airplay (Monitor Latino)	10
Estonia Airplay (TopHit)	49
Finland Airplay (Radiosoittolista)	53
Germany Airplay (BVMI)	30
Guatemala Anglo Airplay (Monitor Latino)	7
Italy Airplay (EarOne)	8
Kazakhstan Airplay (TopHit)	25
Latvia Airplay (TopHit)	5
Lithuania Airplay (TopHit)	16
New Zealand Hot Singles (RMNZ)	36
Nicaragua Anglo Airplay (Monitor Latino)	3
North Macedonia Airplay (Radiomonitor)	12
Romania Airplay (TopHit)	115
Serbia Airplay (Radiomonitor)	6

=== Monthly charts ===
Monthly chart performance
Chart (2025–2026)	Peak position
Estonia Airplay (TopHit)	58
Kazakhstan Airplay (TopHit)	77
Latvia Airplay (TopHit)	8
Lithuania Airplay (TopHit)	17

== Release history ==
Region	Date	Format	Label	Ref.
Various	October 23, 2025	Digital download; streaming	SMG	
Italy	November 14, 2025	Radio airplay	EMI	
