= Younger and Hotter Than Me =

Promotional single by Selena Gomez and Benny Blanco

from the album I Said I Love You First
- B-side: "Younger and Hotter Than Me" (instrumental)
- Released: March 21, 2025
- Studio: 555 Studios (Los Angeles, CA); Doheny Studios (West Hollywood, CA); Astronave Studios (Los Angeles, CA)
- Genre: Pop
- Length: 3:09
- Label: SMG Music LLC; Friends Keep Secrets; Interscope
- Songwriters: Selena Gomez; Benjamin Levin; Finneas O'Connell
- Producers: Benny Blanco; Finneas

Music video
- "Younger and Hotter Than Me" on YouTube

"Younger and Hotter Than Me" is a song by American singer Selena Gomez and American record producer Benny Blanco, released as the second promotional single from their collaborative studio album, I Said I Love You First. Gomez and Blanco wrote the track with Finneas O'Connell. Blanco and Finneas also produced the song. SMG Music LLC, Friends Keep Secrets and Interscope Records released the song for download and streaming on March 21, 2025.

== Background and release ==
In February 2025, Gomez and Blanco announced their collaboration project, I Said I Love You First. They released the lead single, "Call Me When You Break Up". During their interview with Interview Magazine on February 14, they hinted at a first single titled "Younger and Hotter Than Me." On March 20, Gomez announced the song's release, along with its music video and the album via her social media.

== Music video ==
On March 21, 2025, "Younger and Hotter Than Me" was released for download and streaming, accompanied by its official music video, directed by Jake Schreier.

The video opens with Gomez in an abandoned studio, surrounded by dust-covered sets. She wakes up in a space reminiscent of the Wizards of Waverly Place living room and wanders through the lot, haunted by memories. Passing a High School Musical-style set filled with dancing teens, she feels the weight of time. Blanco joins her briefly for lunch, but as he leaves, it's clear—Gomez remains stuck in a world of child stardom, long after everyone else has moved on.

== Charts ==
Chart performance for "Younger and Hotter Than Me"
Chart (2025)	Peak position
Canada Hot 100 (Billboard)	85
Costa Rica Anglo Airplay (Monitor Latino)	9
Global 200 (Billboard)	166
New Zealand Hot Singles (RMNZ)	11
UK Physical Singles Chart (OCC)	4
UK Video Streaming (OCC)	93
US Bubbling Under Hot 100 (Billboard)	2

== Release history ==
Release dates and formats for "Younger and Hotter Than Me"
Region	Date	Format	Label	Ref.
Various	March 21, 2025	Digital download; streaming	SMG Music LLC; Friends Keep Secrets; Interscope	
United States	March 21, 2025	7-inch vinyl	SMG Music LLC; Friends Keep Secrets; Interscope	
