= Te Olvido (La La) =

2026 song by Benny Blanco, Selena Gomez and Becky G

Single by Benny Blanco, Selena Gomez and Becky G

from the album Hermoso
- Released: July 31, 2026
- Genre: Cumbia
- Length: 2:30
- Label: Friends Keep Secrets; Interscope
- Songwriters: Benjamin Levin; Kevyn Mauricio Cruz Moreno; Magnus August Høiberg; Nathaniel Campany; Rebbeca Marie Gomez; Sara Schell; Selena Gomez
- Producers: Benny Blanco; Cashmere Cat

Benny Blanco singles chronology
"Joven y Salvaje" (2026)	"Te Olvido (La La)" (2026)

Selena Gomez singles chronology
"In the Dark" (2025)	"Te Olvido (La La)" (2026)

Becky G singles chronology
"Patrona" (2026)	"Te Olvido (La La)" (2026)

Lyric video
- "Te Olvido (La La)" on YouTube

"Te Olvido (La La)" is a song recorded by American record producer Benny Blanco and singers Selena Gomez and Becky G.

== Charts ==
Chart performance for "Te Olvido (La La)"
Chart (2026)	Peak position
Argentina Hot 100 (Billboard)	30
Argentina Airplay (Monitor Latino)	19
Bolivia Airplay (Monitor Latino)	16
Croatia International Airplay (Top lista)	85
Italy Airplay (EarOne)	67
Lithuania Airplay (TopHit)	89
Romania Airplay (TopHit)	95
Paraguay Airplay (Monitor Latino)	13
Turkey International Airplay (Radiomonitor Türkiye)	4
US Hot Latin Songs (Billboard)	14
US Hot Latin Pop Songs (Billboard)	2
US Hot Tropical Songs (Billboard)	3
US Latin Pop Airplay (Billboard)	14

== Release history ==
Region	Date	Format	Label	Ref.
Various	July 31, 2026	Digital download; streaming	Friends Keep Secrets; Interscope	
Italy	August 7, 2026	Radio airplay	EMI; Sony	
