= Call Me When You Break Up =

Single by Selena Gomez, Benny Blanco and Gracie Abrams

from the album I Said I Love You First
- Released: February 20, 2025
- Studio: 555 Studios (Los Angeles, CA); Doheny Studios (West Hollywood, CA)
- Genre: Dance-pop; pop rock
- Length: 2:07 (single version); 2:58 (extended version)
- Label: SMG Music LLC; Friends Keep Secrets; Interscope
- Songwriters: Selena Gomez; Benjamin Levin; Gracie Abrams; Julia Michaels; Justin Tranter; Mattias Larsson; Robin Fredriksson; Cashmere Cat; Dylan Brady
- Producers: Benny Blanco; Cashmere Cat; Dylan Brady

Selena Gomez singles chronology
"Love On" (2024)	"Call Me When You Break Up" (2025)	"Sunset Blvd" (2025)

Benny Blanco singles chronology
"Degenere" (2024)	"Call Me When You Break Up" (2025)	"Sunset Blvd" (2025)

Gracie Abrams singles chronology
"That's So True" (2024)	"Call Me When You Break Up" (2025)	"Hit the Wall" (2026)

Music video
- "Call Me When You Break Up" on YouTube

"Call Me When You Break Up" is a song by American singer Selena Gomez, American record producer Benny Blanco, and American singer-songwriter Gracie Abrams, released as the lead single from Gomez and Blanco's collaborative studio album, I Said I Love You First (2025). Gomez and Abrams wrote the song with Dylan Brady, Julia Michaels, Justin Tranter, Mattias Larsson, Robin Fredriksson, Cashmere Cat and Blanco who also produced the song along with Cashmere Cat and Dylan Brady. SMG Music LLC, Friends Keep Secrets and Interscope Records released the song for download and streaming on February 20, 2025.

== Background and release ==
Gomez and Blanco began teasing their collaboration with Abrams on February 17, when Blanco shared a video on his social media where he enters a bedroom and finds Gomez and Abrams chatting on the bed, he asks them: "What are you guys doing in here?" and they both reply: "Hello!". The next day, Gomez posted a selfie-style clip lip syncing along to an unreleased track. "Call me when you break up/ I want to be the first one on your mind when you wake up/ I miss the way we'd stay up/ We'd talk about forever while I’m taking off my makeup". On the same day, Gomez introduced the song to her fans during a special event to promote her album, I Said I Love You First, in London, United Kingdom, while Abrams performed her verse of the song during her concert on her The Secret of Us Tour in Hamburg, Germany.

On February 20, 2025, "Call Me When You Break Up" was released for download and streaming, along with the video shot on the front-facing camera, it shows Gomez and Abrams singing along to their new song while in a bedroom. The next day, it was sent to Italian radio stations by Universal Music Group, as well as on American contemporary hit radio, and on United Kingdom radio on February 28, 2025.

The CD and LP version of the album only includes Gomez's solo version of "Call Me When You Break Up (Selena's Edition)", released on March 21, 2025. Blanco, Gomez, and Abrams also released an acoustic version of the song for download and streaming on March 28, 2025.

== Composition and recording ==
"Call Me When You Break Up" is a dance-pop and pop rock song, opens with a voicemail tone, but not in the traditional sense of R&B stars singing over lovelorn recordings from their answering machine. Gomez and Abrams are the ones leaving a message at the beep. “Call me when you break up/Unless you’ve found the person that you want a new name from/I’d to be there when the day comes/You know I’m always here, so don’t ever be a stranger,” Gomez sings. Blanco told Interview, that the song was recorded at home, and the couple did not go to the studio every day, but preferred to record the album at home: "I’d be like, ‘Hey, I have this cool chord thing.’ Then she’d come in. We weren’t like, ‘Today’s the studio. We’re going to write this song and that.’ So many times it was so hodgepodge. It was like two hours here, two hours there. I’d never worked that way with someone. Usually I work that way if I’m by myself, but it was so cool to be able to do that with her".

== Critical reception ==
Jason Lipshutz from Billboard praised the song, describing it: "such fizzy joy that its two-minute run time flies", writing that Gomez and Abrams need to keep recording together and "letting their personalities ricochet off each other". The Stardust magazine, wrote that: "Gomez and Abrams' voices blend seamlessly, with Abrams' charismatic, introspective style complementing Gomez's soft, emotive delivery", adding that Blanco's co-writing "added to the creative synergy behind this string-enhanced pop collaboration".

== Charts ==
=== Weekly charts ===
Weekly chart performance for "Call Me When You Break Up"
Chart (2025)	Peak position
Argentina Anglo Airplay (Monitor Latino)	5
Australia (ARIA)	82
Austria (Ö3 Austria Top 40)	71
Canada Hot 100 (Billboard)	41
Canada CHR/Top 40 (Billboard)	20
CIS Airplay (TopHit)	181
Croatia International Airplay (Top lista)	41
Estonia Airplay (TopHit)	6
Germany (GfK)	61
Global 200 (Billboard)	54
Greece International (IFPI)	81
Ireland (IRMA)	37
Japan Hot Overseas (Billboard Japan)	9
Kazakhstan Airplay (TopHit)	161
Latvia Airplay (LaIPA)	12
Lithuania Airplay (TopHit)	25
Netherlands (Dutch Top 40)	37
New Zealand Hot Singles (RMNZ)	6
Norway Airplay (VG-lista)	92
Panama Anglo Airplay (Monitor Latino)	3
Paraguay Anglo Airplay (Monitor Latino)	10
Peru Anglo Airplay (Monitor Latino)	13
Poland (Polish Airplay Top 100)	20
Portugal (AFP)	79
San Marino Airplay (SMRTV Top 50)	12
Sweden Heatseeker (Sverigetopplistan)	2
UK Singles (Official Charts)	28
Uruguay Anglo Airplay (Monitor Latino)	6
US Billboard Hot 100	46
US Adult Contemporary (Billboard)	30
US Adult Pop Airplay (Billboard)	16
US Pop Airplay (Billboard)	18
Venezuela Airplay (Record Report)	84

=== Monthly charts ===
Monthly chart performance for "Call Me When You Break Up"
Chart (2025)	Position
Estonia Airplay (TopHit)	12
Lithuania Airplay (TopHit)	34

=== Year-end charts ===
2025 year-end chart performance for "Call Me When You Break Up"
Chart (2025)	Position
Argentina Anglo Airplay (Monitor Latino)	32
Estonia Airplay (TopHit)	125

== Certifications ==
Certifications for "Call Me When You Break Up"
Region	Certification	Certified units/sales
Brazil (Pro-Música Brasil)	Platinum	40,000^{‡}
Canada (Music Canada)	Gold	40,000^{‡}
United Kingdom (BPI)	Silver	200,000^{‡}
^{‡} Sales+streaming figures based on certification alone.

== Release history ==
Release dates and formats for "Call Me When You Break Up"
Region	Date	Format	Label	Ref.
Various	February 20, 2025	Digital download; streaming	SMG Music LLC; Friends Keep Secrets; Interscope	
Italy	February 21, 2025	Radio airplay	Universal	
United States	February 21, 2025	Contemporary hit radio	A&M; SMG Music LLC; Friends Keep Secrets; Interscope	
United Kingdom	February 28, 2025	Contemporary hit radio	A&M; SMG Music LLC; Friends Keep Secrets; Interscope	
