= List of Selena Gomez live performances =

Selena Gomez live performances
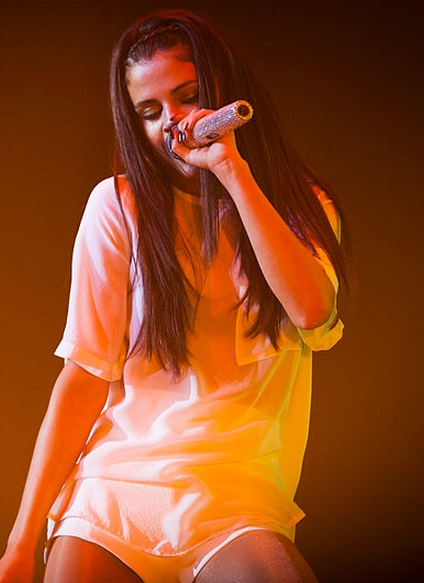
- Gomez performing during her first solo tour Stars Dance Tour (2013)
- Concert tours: 2
- Live performances: 121

American singer Selena Gomez has released three studio albums since her solo debut in 2013. This has resulted in two concert tours all of them worldwide, a lot of TV and award shows performances. During her Disney Channel days Gomez formed Selena Gomez & The Scene, her first musical group. They toured three times and the musical formation broke up in 2012 after ending their third and final concert tour named We Own the Night Tour. After the band's departure, Gomez has been releasing new music as a solo artist. She has been promoting all of her albums as well as her debut one Stars Dance, through 2013 and 2014, through performances at several festivals including the Rodeo Houston.

A tour in support of the album began in August 2013 and was named Stars Dance Tour. The tour was scheduled to visit Asia and Oceania between January and February 2014 but those legs were cancelled due to Gomez being diagnosed with lupus. After completion, the tour grossed over US$44,3 million.

In October 2015, Gomez released her second studio album as a solo artist; Revival. The singer announced in late November that she would tour the world with a tour in support of the new album. The tour began in Las Vegas in May 2016 and ended three months later in New Zealand. The Revival Tour was expected to visit Europe in October and November 2016 before visiting Latin America the following month but got canceled in August 2016 due to the singer's anxiety and depression, both symptoms of her disease.

== Concert tours ==
Title	Date	Associated album(s)	Continent(s)	Shows	Gross	Attendance	Ref.
Stars Dance Tour	August 14, 2013 – March 9, 2014	Stars Dance	North America; Europe; Asia	58	$35,300,000	393,716	
Revival Tour	May 6 – August 13, 2016	Revival	North America; Asia; Oceania	55	$35,600,000	541,444	

== Award shows ==
Event	Date	City	Performed song(s)	Ref.
37th People's Choice Awards	January 5, 2011	Los Angeles	"A Year Without Rain"	
2011 MuchMusic Video Awards	June 19, 2011	Toronto	"Who Says"	
2011 Teen Choice Awards	August 7, 2011	Los Angeles	"Love You like a Love Song"	
2011 MTV Europe Music Awards	November 6, 2011	Belfast	"Hit the Lights"	
2013 MTV Movie Awards	April 14, 2013	Los Angeles	"Come & Get It"	
2013 Radio Disney Music Awards	April 27, 2013	Los Angeles	"Come & Get It"	
2013 Billboard Music Awards	May 19, 2013	Las Vegas	"Come & Get It"	
American Music Awards 2014	November 23, 2014	Los Angeles	"The Heart Wants What It Wants"	
American Music Awards 2015	November 22, 2015	Los Angeles	"Same Old Love"	
Billboard Women in Music	December 11, 2015	New York City	"Same Old Love"	
American Music Awards 2017	November 19, 2017	Los Angeles	"Wolves" (with Marshmello)	
American Music Awards 2019	November 24, 2019	Los Angeles	"Lose You to Love Me" / "Look at Her Now"	
Premio Lo Nuestro 2021 (Note: Gomez and Alejandro performed "Baila Conmigo" as pre-taped for the Lo Nuestro Awards.)	February 18, 2021	Miami	"Baila Conmigo" (with Rauw Alejandro)	

== Music festivals ==
Event	Date	City	Performed song(s)	Ref.
San Antonio Stock Show & Rodeo	February 7, 2010	San Antonio	Selena Gomez & the Scene: Live in Concert setlist	
Pop-Con	February 20, 2010	Uniondale	Selena Gomez & the Scene: Live in Concert setlist	
Houston Livestock Show and Rodeo	March 21, 2010	Houston	Selena Gomez & the Scene: Live in Concert setlist	
Musikfest	August 14, 2010	Bethlehem	Selena Gomez & the Scene: Live in Concert setlist	
Indiana State Fair	August 15, 2010	Indianapolis	Selena Gomez & the Scene: Live in Concert setlist	
Illinois State Fair	August 21, 2010	Springfield	Selena Gomez & the Scene: Live in Concert setlist	
Starburst Summer Concert Series	August 21, 2010	Eureka	Selena Gomez & the Scene: Live in Concert setlist	
York State Fair	September 11, 2010	York	Selena Gomez & the Scene: Live in Concert setlist	
Los Angeles County Fair	September 18, 2010	Pomona	Selena Gomez & the Scene: Live in Concert setlist	
Kansas State Fair	September 19, 2010	Hutchinson	Selena Gomez & the Scene: Live in Concert setlist	
Big Fresno Fair	October 10, 2010	Fresno	Selena Gomez & the Scene: Live in Concert setlist	
KIIS FM's Jingle Ball	December 5, 2010	Los Angeles	"Round & Round" · "Off the Chain" · "Rock God" · "A Year without Rain" · "Naturally"	
101.3 KDWB's Jingle Ball	December 6, 2010	Minneapolis	"Round & Round" · "Off the Chain" · "Rock God" · "A Year without Rain" · "Naturally"	
Q102 Jingle Ball	December 8, 2010	Camden	"Round & Round" · "Off the Chain" · "Rock God" · "A Year without Rain" · "Naturally"	
Kiss 108's Jingle Ball	December 9, 2010	Lowell	"Round & Round" · "Off the Chain" · "Rock God" · "A Year without Rain" · "Naturally"	
Z100 Jingle Ball	December 10, 2010	New York City	"Round & Round" · "Off the Chain" · "Rock God" · "A Year without Rain" · "Naturally"	
Arizona State Fair	October 24, 2010	Phoenix	A Year without Rain Tour setlist	
Borderfest	March 5, 2011	Hidalgo	A Year without Rain Tour setlist	
Houston Livestock Show and Rodeo	March 6, 2011	Houston	A Year without Rain Tour setlist	
Dixon May Fair	May 7, 2011	Dixon	A Year without Rain Tour setlist	
Wango Tango	May 14, 2011	Los Angeles	"Round & Round" · "Naturally" · "A Year without Rain" · "Who Says" (Not in order)	
Orange County Fair	July 24, 2011	Costa Mesa	We Own the Night Tour setlist	
California Mid-State Fair	July 25, 2011	Paso Robles	We Own the Night Tour setlist	
Maryland State Fair	August 26, 2011	Timonium	We Own the Night Tour setlist	
New York State Fair	August 27, 2011	Syracuse	We Own the Night Tour setlist	
Colorado State Fair	September 3, 2011	Pueblo	We Own the Night Tour setlist	
Oregon State Fair	September 5, 2011	Salem	We Own the Night Tour setlist	
Washington State Fair	September 12, 2011	Puyallup	We Own the Night Tour setlist	
KDND's Jingle Ball	December 1, 2011	Sacramento	"Who Says" · "Round & Round" · "Love You Like a Love Song" · "Bang Bang Bang" · "The One That Got Away" · "Hit the Lights" · "Naturally" · "A Year without Rain" · "Tell Me Something I Don't Know" (Not in order)	
Phooson	December 2, 2011	Phoenix	We Own the Night Tour setlist	
99.7's Triple Ho Show	December 13, 2011	San Jose	We Own the Night Tour setlist	
B96's SoBe Lifewater Jingle Bash	December 17, 2011	Rosemont	We Own the Night Tour setlist	
106.1 KISS FM's Jingle Bell Bash	December 18, 2011	Seattle	We Own the Night Tour setlist	
106.1 KISS FM's Jingle Ball	December 2, 2013	Dallas	"Birthday" · "B.E.A.T." · "Undercover" · "Come & Get It" · "Slow Down"	
KIIS-FM's Jingle Ball 2013	December 6, 2013	Los Angeles	"Birthday" · "Undercover" · "Come & Get It"	
KBKS’ Jingle Ball	December 8, 2013	Everett	"Naturally" · "Come & Get It" · "Love You like a Love Song" · "Slow Down" · "B.E.A.T." · "Undercover"	
Z100 Jingle Ball	December 13, 2013	New York City	"Slow Down" · "Love You like a Love Song" · "B.E.A.T." · "Undercover" · "Come & Get It"	
Kiss 108's Jingle Ball	December 14, 2013	Boston	"Slow Down" · "Love You like a Love Song" · "Naturally" · "Who Says" · "B.E.A.T." · "Undercover" · "Come & Get It"	
Houston Livestock Show and Rodeo	March 9, 2014	Houston	Stars Dance Tour setlist	
Wild 94.9's Jingle Ball	December 3, 2015	Oakland	"Same Old Love" · "Good for You" · "Love You like a Love Song" · "Hands to Myself" · "Kill Em with Kindness"	
KIIS-FM's Jingle Ball	December 4, 2015	Los Angeles	"Same Old Love" · "Good for You" · "Love You like a Love Song" · "Hands to Myself" · "Kill Em with Kindness"	
Q102's Jingle Ball	December 9, 2015	Philadelphia	"Same Old Love" · "Good for You" · "Love You like a Love Song" · "Hands to Myself" · "Kill Em with Kindness"	
Z100 Jingle Ball	December 11, 2015	New York City	"Same Old Love" · "Good for You" · "Love You like a Love Song" · "Hands to Myself" · "Kill Em with Kindness"	
103.5 KISS FM's Jingle Ball	December 16, 2015	Rosemont	"Same Old Love" · "Good for You" · "Love You like a Love Song" · "Hands to Myself" · "Kill Em with Kindness"	
Summerfest	June 29, 2016	Milwaukee	Revival Tour setlist	
Festival d'été de Québec	July 11, 2016	Quebec City	Revival Tour setlist	
Coachella 2019 (Note: Gomez appeared as a surprise guest performer on the of DJ Snake's set on Coachella.)	April 12, 2019	Indio	"Taki Taki" (with DJ Snake, Ozuna and Cardi B)	

== Other performances ==
Event	Date	City	Performed song(s)	Ref.
Dancing with the Stars	September 29, 2009	Los Angeles	"Falling Down"	
Teletón	December 5, 2009	Mexico City	"Falling Down" · "Naturally"	
The Ellen DeGeneres Show	December 11, 2009	Los Angeles	"Naturally"	
Dick Clark's New Year's Rockin' Eve	January 1, 2010	Las Vegas	"More" · "Naturally"	
Good Morning America	February 11, 2010	New York City	"Naturally" · "More"	
GMTV	April 5, 2010	London	"Naturally"	
Live from Studio Five	April 6, 2010	London	"Naturally"	
MTV Live Sessions	April 15, 2010	London	"Falling Down" · "Naturally" · "Kiss & Tell" · "Tell Me Something I Don't Know" · "The Way I Loved You"	
America's Got Talent	July 14, 2010	Los Angeles	"Round & Round"	
Radio Disney	September 21, 2010	Los Angeles	"Round & Round" · "A Year Without Rain"	
The Ellen DeGeneres Show	September 22, 2010	Los Angeles	"A Year without Rain"	
Good Morning America	September 23, 2010	New York City	"Round & Round" · "A Year without Rain"	
Daybreak	September 27, 2010	London	"Round & Round"	
Blue Peter	September 28, 2010	London	"Round & Round"	
The Seven	October 1, 2010	London	"Round & Round"	
The 5:19 Show	October 2, 2010	London	"Round & Round"	
Justin Timberlake Shriners Hospitals for Children Open	October 23, 2010	Las Vegas	A Year without Rain Tour setlist	
Lopez Tonight	November 16, 2010	Los Angeles	"A Year without Rain" / "Un Año sin Lluvia"	
Live! with Regis and Kelly	December 1, 2010	New York City	"A Year without Rain"	
Sukkiri	February 24, 2011	Tokyo	"Round & Round"	
Late Show with David Letterman	March 16, 2011	New York City	"Who Says"	
The Seven	March 18, 2011	New York City	"Who Says"	
Concert for Hope	March 20, 2011	Los Angeles	"Round & Round" · "More" · "Rock God" · "Off the Chain" · "Falling Down" · "Price Tag" · "Who Says" · "A Year without Rain" · "Tell Me Something I Don't Know" · "Naturally" · "Magic"	
The Ellen DeGeneres Show	March 22, 2011	Los Angeles	"Who Says"	
Dancing with the Stars	April 5, 2011	Los Angeles	"Who Says"	
Good Morning America	June 17, 2011	New York City	"Who Says" · "Love You like a Love Song" · "Naturally"	
So Random!	June 19, 2011 (Pre-recorded)	Burbank	"Who Says"	
Late Night with Jimmy Fallon	June 24, 2011	New York City	"Who Says"	
Live! with Regis and Kelly	June 29, 2011	New York City	"Who Says"	
Daybreak	July 8, 2011	London	"Love You Like a Love Song"	
The Tonight Show with Jay Leno	September 19, 2011	Los Angeles	"Love You Like a Love Song"	
The Ellen DeGeneres Show	November 17, 2011	Los Angeles	"Love You Like a Love Song"	
Speak Now World Tour	November 22, 2011	New York City	"Who Says"	
MTV New Year's Eve specials	December 31, 2011	New York City	"Love You Like a Love Song" · "Hit the Lights"	
UNICEF Benefit Concert	January 19, 2013	New York City	"Love You Like a Love Song" · "Round & Round" · "Bang Bang Bang" · "I Knew You Were Trouble" · "...Baby One More Time" · "Rock God" · "Ho Hey" · "Cry Me a River" · "Hit the Lights" · "Naturally" · "A Year without Rain" · "Dream" · "Who Says"	
Dancing with the Stars	April 16, 2013	Los Angeles	"Come & Get It"	
The Ellen DeGeneres Show	April 18, 2013	Los Angeles	"Come & Get It"	
Late Show with David Letterman	April 25, 2013	New York City	"Come & Get It"	
The Graham Norton Show	May 23, 2013	London	"Come & Get It"	
Walmart Soundcheck	July 20, 2013	Nashville	"Hit the Lights" · "Who Says" · "Love You like a Love Song" · "Come & Get It" · "Naturally"	
NFL Thanksgiving Day Halftime Show	November 28, 2013	Arlington	"Like a Champion" · "Slow Down" · "Come & Get It"	
Christmas for the Kids Show	December 12, 2013	Rosemont	"Come & Get It" · "B.E.A.T."	
The 1989 World Tour	August 27, 2015	Los Angeles	"Good for You" (with Taylor Swift)	
Revival Event	September 16, 2015	Los Angeles	"Same Old Love" · "Good for You"	
Alan Carr: Chatty Man	September 24, 2015	London	"Good for You"	
Live Lounge	September 25, 2015	London	"Good for You" · "Rude"	
Le Grand Journal	September 28, 2015	Paris	"Good for You"	
The Ellen DeGeneres Show	October 8, 2015	Burbank	"Same Old Love"	
The Today Show	October 12, 2015	New York City	"Good for You" · "Same Old Love" · "Come & Get It" · "Me & the Rhythm"	
The Tonight Show Starring Jimmy Fallon	October 14, 2015	New York City	"Same Old Love"	
Victoria's Secret Fashion Show 2015	November 10, 2015	New York City	"Hands to Myself" · "Me & My Girls"	
Children in Need 2015	November 14, 2015	Borehamwood	"Same Old Love"	
Saturday Night Live	January 23, 2016	New York City	"Good for You" · "Same Old Love" · "Hands to Myself"	
We Day	April 7, 2016	Inglewood	"Kill Em with Kindness"	
Carpool Karaoke	June 20, 2016	Los Angeles	"Same Old Love" · "Come & Get It" · "Hands to Myself" · "Kill Em with Kindness" · "Love You Like a Love Song" · "Shake It Off"	
Reputation Stadium Tour	May 19, 2018	Pasadena	"Hands to Myself" (with Taylor Swift)	
Inner Monologue Tour	November 12, 2019	Los Angeles	"Anxiety" (with Julia Michaels)	
The Village Studio	February 24, 2020	Los Angeles	"Rare"	
2021 UEFA Champions League final	May 29, 2021	Porto	"Wolves" (with Marshmello)	
The Late Late Show with James Corden	October 18, 2021	Los Angeles	"Let Somebody Go" (with Coldplay)	
Music of the Spheres World Tour	October 1, 2023	Pasadena	"Let Somebody Go" (with Coldplay)	
