= Selena Gomez & the Scene discography =

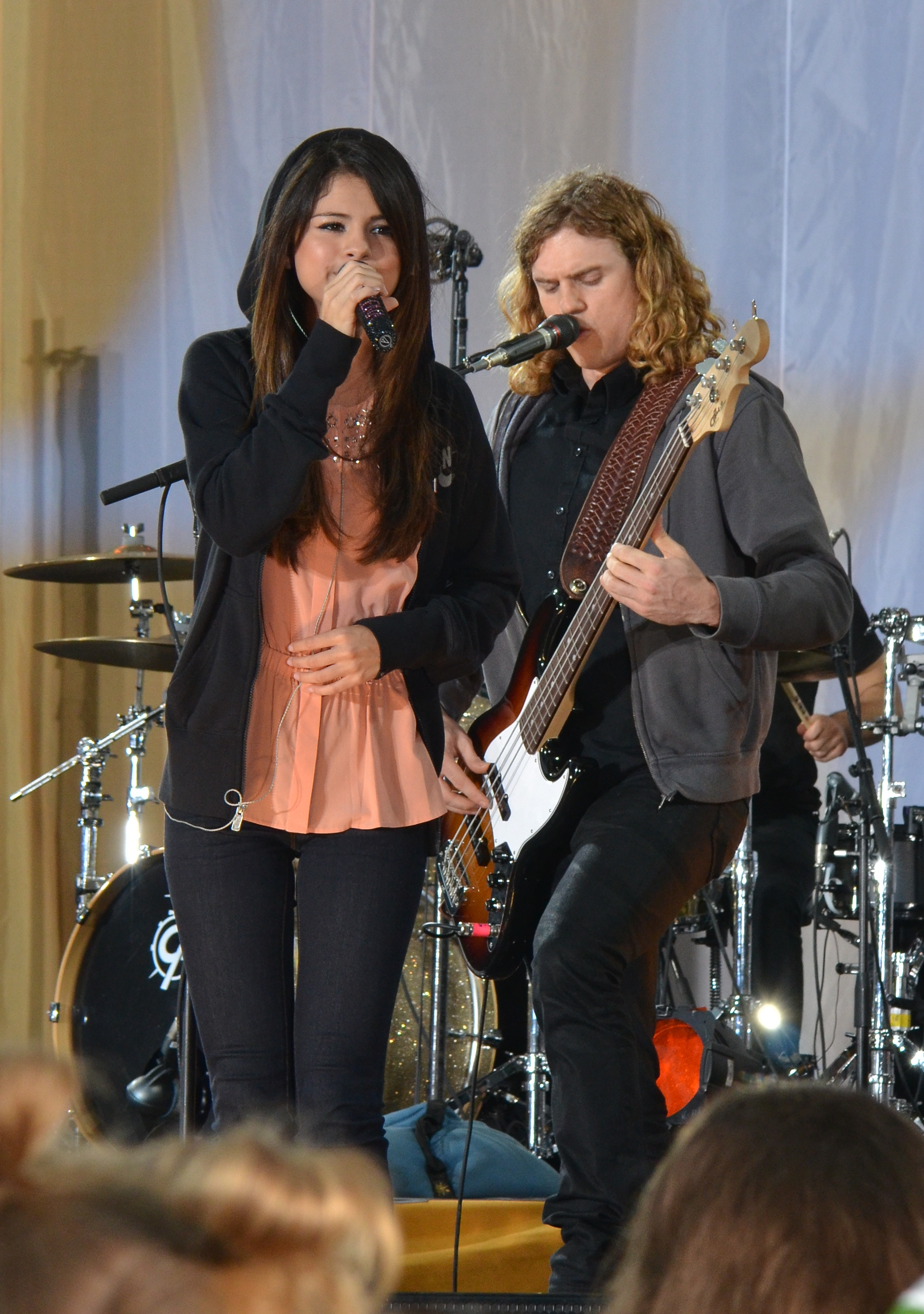
- Studio albums: 3
- Compilation albums: 2
- Singles: 7
- Music videos: 10
- Promotional singles: 4

Selena Gomez & the Scene, an American band, has released three studio albums, one remix album, one karaoke album, 7 singles and 4 promotional singles. The band released their debut album, Kiss & Tell on September 29, 2009. The album debuted at number nine on the US Billboard 200 and in March 2010 the album was certified gold by Recording Industry Association of America (RIAA). The second single from the album, "Naturally", reached the top thirty in the United States, the top twenty in New Zealand, Canada and Germany and the top ten in both Ireland and the United Kingdom. The song has also been certified platinum in the United States and Canada. Their second album, A Year Without Rain was released on September 21, 2010. It debuted on the US Billboard 200 at number four and was certified Gold by the RIAA in January 2011. Two singles were released from the album, "Round & Round" and "A Year Without Rain".

Their third album, When the Sun Goes Down was released on June 28, 2011. The first single from the album, "Who Says" was released on March 14, 2011. The second single from the album, "Love You like a Love Song" was released on June 17, 2011. The album peaked at number 3 on the US Billboard 200. It stayed for an entire month in the top ten. In its first week the album sold over 78,000 copies. It was certified Gold in the US by the RIAA on November 17, 2011. As of March 2015, the band sold over 5 million albums with combined sales from Kiss & Tell, A Year Without Rain and When the Sun Goes Down.

== Albums ==
=== Studio albums ===
List of albums, with selected chart positions, sales and certifications
Title	Album details	Peak chart position										Sales	Certifications
Title	Album details	US	AUS	AUT	BEL (FL)	CAN	GER	IRE	NOR	NZ	UK	Sales	Certifications
Kiss & Tell	Released: September 29, 2009; Label: Hollywood; Formats: CD, CD+DVD, digital download, LP	9	—	4	22	22	19	14	38	21	12	US: 930,000 (Note: United States sales figures for albums as of July 2021.); UK: 66,085 (Note: United Kingdom sales figures for Kiss & Tell as of July 2013.)	RIAA: Platinum; BPI: Silver; MC: Gold
A Year Without Rain	Released: September 17, 2010; Label: Hollywood; Formats: CD, CD+DVD, digital download, LP	4	46	19	11	6	22	40	—	24	14	US: 819,000; UK: 60,762 (Note: United Kingdom sales figures for A Year Without Rain as of July 2013.)	RIAA: Gold; BPI: Silver; MC: Gold
When the Sun Goes Down	Released: June 21, 2011; Label: Hollywood; Formats: CD, digital download, LP	3	14	11	6	2	18	13	6	8	15	US: 714,000; UK: 53,644 (Note: United Kingdom sales figures for When the Sun Goes Down as of July 2013.)	RIAA: Platinum; BPI: Silver; MC: Platinum; RMNZ: Gold
"—" denotes releases that did not chart or were not released in that territory.

=== Compilation albums ===
List of compilation albums, with selected details
Title	Album details	Notes
The Club Remixes	Released: December 21, 2010; Label: Hollywood; Format: Digital download	Remix album
Artist Karaoke Series: Selena Gomez & the Scene	Released: September 13, 2011; Label: Hollywood; Format: CD, digital download	Karaoke album in the Walt Disney series

== Singles ==
List of singles, with selected chart positions and certifications
Title	Year	Peak chart positions										Certifications	Album
Title	Year	US	AUS	BEL (FL)	CAN	GER	IRE	NOR	NZ	SWE	UK	Certifications	Album
"Falling Down"	2009	82	—	—	69	—	—	—	—	—	—	RIAA: Gold	Kiss & Tell
"Naturally"	2009	29	46	7	18	14	7	—	20	56	7	RIAA: 4× Platinum; BPI: Silver; MC: Platinum	Kiss & Tell
"Round & Round"	2010	24	80	— (Note: "Round & Round" did not enter the Ultratop 50, but peaked at number 19 on the Flemish Ultratip chart.)	51	52	44	—	—	—	47	RIAA: Platinum; MC: Gold	A Year Without Rain
"A Year Without Rain"	2010	35	78	— (Note: "A Year Without Rain" did not enter the Ultratop 50, but peaked at number 3 on the Flemish Ultratip chart.)	30	56	—	—	—	—	78	RIAA: 2× Platinum; ARIA: Gold; RMNZ: Gold	A Year Without Rain
"Who Says"	2011	21	57	— (Note: "Who Says" did not enter the Ultratop 50, but peaked at number 8 on the Flemish Ultratip chart.)	17	44	36	—	15	—	51	RIAA: 4× Platinum; ARIA: Platinum; BPI: Silver; IFPI NOR: Gold; RMNZ: Platinum	When the Sun Goes Down
"Love You like a Love Song"	2011	22	48	15	10	—	49	14	21	41	58	RIAA: 7× Platinum; ARIA: Gold; BPI: Platinum; BVMI: Gold; GLF: Gold; IFPI NOR: Platinum; RMNZ: 2× Platinum	When the Sun Goes Down
"Hit the Lights"	2012	— (Note: "Hit the Lights" did not enter the Billboard Hot 100, but peaked at number 3 on the Bubbling Under Hot 100 Singles chart.)	—	— (Note: "Hit the Lights" did not enter the Ultratop 50, but peaked at number 11 on the Flemish Ultratip chart.)	55	—	—	—	—	—	—	RIAA: Platinum	When the Sun Goes Down
"—" denotes releases that did not chart or were not released in that territory.

=== Promotional singles ===
List of singles, with selected chart positions and certifications
Title	Year	Peak chart positions		Album
Title	Year	US	CAN	Album
"Live Like There's No Tomorrow"	2010	—	—	Ramona and Beezus and A Year Without Rain
"Un Año Sin Lluvia"	2010	—	—	A Year Without Rain
"Bang Bang Bang"	2011	94	96	When the Sun Goes Down
"Dices"	2011	—	—	When the Sun Goes Down
"—" denotes releases that did not chart or were not released in that territory.

== Guest appearances ==
Title	Year	Album
"Winter Wonderland"	2009	All Wrapped Up Vol. 2

== Music videos ==
List of music videos with their respective directors
Title	Year	Director
"Falling Down"	2009	Chris Dooley
"Naturally"	2009	Chris Dooley
"Round & Round"	2010	Philip Andelman
"A Year Without Rain"	2010	Chris Dooley
"Un Año Sin Lluvia"	2010	Chris Dooley
"Who Says"	2011	Chris Applebaum
"Love You like a Love Song"	2011	Geremy Jasper & Georgie Greville
"Middle of Nowhere (We Own the Night Tour)"	2011	—N/a
"Hit the Lights" (Version 1)	2011	Philip Andelman
"Hit the Lights" (Version 2)	2012	Philip Andelman

== See also ==
- Selena Gomez discography
