= A Year Without Rain Tour =

2010–11 concert tour by Selena Gomez & the Scene

- Tour by Selena Gomez & the Scene
- Cover art for the Santiago performance
- Location: Europe; North America; South America
- Associated album: A Year Without Rain
- Start date: October 20, 2010
- End date: May 14, 2011
- Legs: 4
- No. of shows: 19
- Box office: $7.2 million

Selena Gomez & the Scene concert chronology
- Selena Gomez & the Scene: Live in Concert (2009–10); A Year Without Rain Tour (2010–11); We Own the Night Tour (2011–12)

The A Year Without Rain Tour was the second concert tour by American band Selena Gomez & the Scene. Marked as the band's headlining tour, it supported their second studio album, A Year Without Rain.

== Background ==
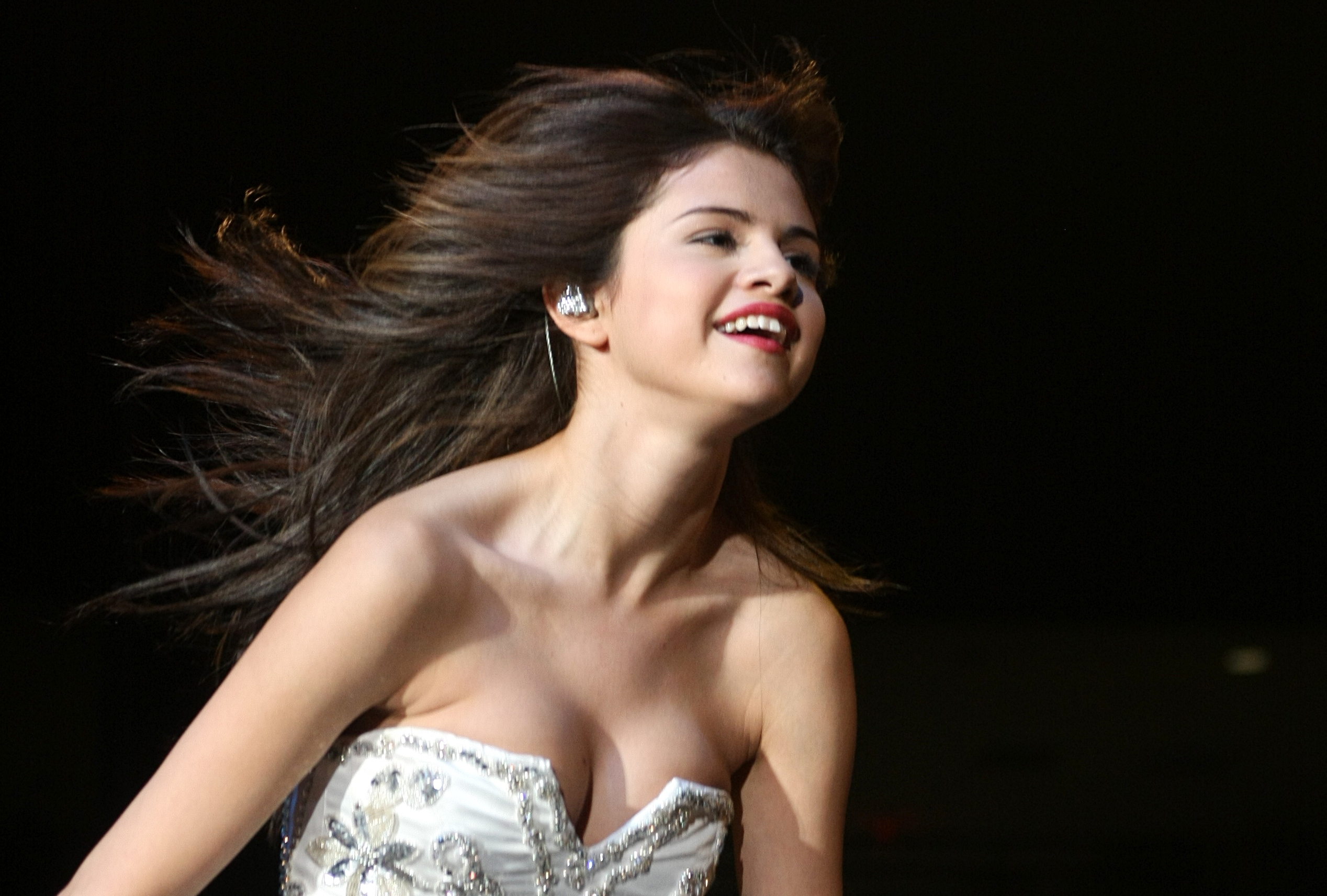
Selena Gomez during the December 2010 show in Lowell

Previously, the band tour the United States and Europe playing at state fairs and music festivals with a few headlining concerts thrown in. The tour became a major success with critics and spectators alike, selling out many dates within the United States. After the release of their second studio album, the band toured alongside Katy Perry, Bruno Mars and Enrique Iglesias for the KIIS-FM Jingle Ball concert series. Gomez remarked her excitement for the tour and stated that it provided motivation to plan a "big" tour for 2011.

During a backstage interview, Gomez remarked that she was conceptualizing the tour as far as stage and production and promised an amazing show with an "epic" stage for 2011. The tour was officially announced on the band's official website in September 2010 to begin in London. The band played their first dates in South America before heading to the United States to perform in festivals.

== Opening act ==
- Allstar Weekend
- Days Difference (Dixon)
- Christina Grimmie

== Set list ==
1. "Round & Round"
2. "Crush"
3. "Kiss & Tell"
4. "More"
5. "You Belong with Me"
6. "I Won't Apologize"
7. "The Way I Loved You"
8. "A Year Without Rain"
9. "I Don't Miss You At All"
10. "Off the Chain"
11. "Hot n Cold"
12. "Falling Down"
13. "Love Is a Battlefield"
14. "In My Head"
15. "Tell Me Something I Don't Know"

Encore

16. "Naturally"
17. "Magic"
Notes
- During the shown in London, "Rock God" replaced "Crush". Additionally, Gomez sang "Intuition", "Parachute", and "Mama Do (Uh Oh, Uh Oh)".
- From December 5 to 10, 2010, only "Round & Round", "Off the Chain", "Rock God", "A Year Without Rain", and "Naturally".
- "Rock God" was not performed on Latin American dates.

== Tour dates ==
List of 2010 concerts
Date	City	Country	Venue	Attendance	Revenue
October 20	London	England	HMV Hammersmith Apollo	—N/a	—N/a
October 23^{[A]}	Las Vegas	United States	Aladdin Theatre for the Performing Arts	—N/a	—N/a
October 24^{[B]}	Phoenix	United States	Arizona Veterans Memorial Coliseum	—N/a	—N/a
November 6	Columbus	United States	Celeste Center	—N/a	—N/a
November 26	Grand Prairie (Note: Labelled as Dallas in promotional material)	United States	Verizon Theatre at Grand Prairie	5,472 / 5,914	$196,072
November 27	Tulsa	United States	Brady Theater	—N/a	—N/a
December 5^{[C]}	Los Angeles	United States	Nokia Theatre L.A. Live	—N/a	—N/a
December 6^{[C]}	Minneapolis	United States	Target Center	—N/a	—N/a
December 8^{[C]}	Camden (Note: Labelled as Philadelphia in promotional material)	United States	Susquehanna Bank Center	—N/a	—N/a
December 9^{[C]}	Lowell (Note: Labelled as Boston in promotional material)	United States	Tsongas Center	—N/a	—N/a
December 10^{[C]}	New York City	United States	Madison Square Garden	—N/a	—N/a

List of 2011 concerts
Date	City	Country	Venue	Attendance	Revenue
January 23	San Juan	Puerto Rico	Coliseo de Puerto Rico	4,893 / 4,996	$438,595
February 2	Santiago	Chile	Movistar Arena	—N/a	—N/a
February 4	Buenos Aires	Argentina	Estadio G.E.B.A.	—N/a	—N/a
March 5^{[D]}	Hidalgo	United States	State Farm Arena	—N/a	—N/a
March 6^{[E]}	Houston	United States	Reliant Stadium	—N/a	—N/a
March 20^{[F]}	Los Angeles	United States	Gibson Amphitheatre	—N/a	—N/a
May 7^{[G]}	Dixon (Note: Labelled as Sacramento in promotional material)	United States	Dixon Fairground Grandstand	—N/a	—N/a
May 14^{[H]}	Los Angeles	United States	Staples Center	—N/a	—N/a
TOTAL				10,365 / 10,910 (95%)	$634,667

Festivals and other miscellaneous performances
^{A} This concert was a part of the Justin Timberlake Shriners Hospitals for Children Open
^{B} This concert was a part of the Arizona State Fair
^{C} These concerts were a part of the Jingle Ball
^{D} This concert is a part of Borderfest
^{E} This concert is a part of Houston Livestock Show and Rodeo
^{F} This concert is a part of Concert for Hope
^{G} This concert is a part of the Dixon May Fair
^{H} This concert is a part of Wango Tango
