= The Club Remixes =

Remix album by Selena Gomez & the Scene
- Released: December 21, 2010
- Genre: EDM
- Length: 36:21
- Label: Hollywood
- Producer: Toby Gad; Kevin Rudolf; Andrew Bolooki; Jeff Halatrax; Antonina Armato; Tim James; Devrim Karaoglu; Jon Lind; Brian Reeves; Dave Audé; Eric Kupper; The Alias

Selena Gomez & the Scene chronology
A Year Without Rain (2010)	The Club Remixes (2010)	When the Sun Goes Down (2011)

The Club Remixes is a remix album by the American band Selena Gomez & the Scene released on December 21, 2010, via Hollywood Records.

== Track listing ==
1. "A Year Without Rain" (Dave Audé club remix) – 8:27
2. "A Year Without Rain" (EK's future classic club mix) – 7:23
3. "Round & Round" (Dave Audé club remix) – 6:23
4. "Naturally" (Dave Audé club remix) – 7:43
5. "A Year Without Rain" (The Alias club remix) – 6:25

== Personnel ==
- Selena Gomez – vocals (all tracks)
- Toby Gad – production (tracks 1, 2, 5)
- Kevin Rudolf – production (track 3)
- Andrew Bolooki – production (track 3)
- Jeff Halatrax – production (track 3)
- Antonina Armato – production (track 4)
- Tim James – production (track 4)
- Jon Lind – vocal production (track 3)
- Brian Reeves – vocal production (track 3)
- Devrim Karaoglu – co-production (track 4)
- Dave Audé – remixing (tracks 1, 3, 4)
- Eric Kupper – remixing (track 2)
- The Alias – remixing (track 5)
