= Selena Gomez & the Scene: Live in Concert =

2009–10 concert tour by Selena Gomez & the Scene

- Tour by Selena Gomez & the Scene
- Promotional poster for 2009 tour
- Location: England; U.S.
- Associated album: Kiss & Tell
- Start date: November 15, 2009
- End date: October 10, 2010
- Legs: 2
- No. of shows: 19

Selena Gomez & the Scene concert chronology
- Selena Gomez & the Scene: Live in Concert (2009–10); A Year Without Rain Tour (2010–11)

The Selena Gomez & the Scene: Live in Concert was the debut concert tour by American band Selena Gomez & the Scene. Beginning in the fall of 2009, the trek supported the band's debut studio album, Kiss & Tell. The tour primarily reached the United States and England.

== Opening acts ==
- JLS (Bethlehem)
- Mitchel Musso (Springfield)

== Set list ==
=== Leg 1 ===
1. "Kiss & Tell"
2. "Stop & Erase"
3. "Crush"
4. "Naturally"
5. "I Won't Apologize"
6. "More"
7. "The Way I Loved You"
8. "I Want It That Way" (Backstreet Boys cover)
9. "I Don't Miss You at All"
10. "Tell Me Something I Don't Know"
11. "Falling Down"
12. "Hot n Cold" (Katy Perry cover)

Encore

13. "I Promise You"
14. "Magic"

=== Leg 2 ===
1. "Round & Round"
2. "Crush"
3. "Kiss & Tell"
4. "More"
5. "You Belong with Me" (Taylor Swift cover)
6. "I Won't Apologize"
7. "The Way I Loved You"
8. "A Year Without Rain"
9. "I Don't Miss You At All"
10. "Hot n Cold"
11. "Falling Down"
12. "Love Is a Battlefield" (Pat Benatar cover)
13. "In My Head" (Jason Derulo cover)
14. "Tell Me Something I Don't Know"

Encore

15. "Naturally"
16. "Magic"

== Tour dates ==
List of 2009 concerts
Date (2009)	City	Country	Venue	Attendance	Revenue
November 15	San Diego	United States	House of Blues	—N/a	—N/a
November 21	Anaheim	United States	House of Blues	—N/a	—N/a
November 28	Dallas	United States	House of Blues	1,203 / 1,741 (69%)	$40,185
December 13	Tempe (Note: Labelled as Phoenix in promotional material)	United States	Marquee Theatre	—N/a	—N/a
December 20	San Francisco	United States	Palace of Fine Arts Theatre	953 / 953 (100%)	$26,507

List of 2010 concerts
Date (2010)	City	Country	Venue	Attendance	Revenue
February 7^{[A]}	San Antonio	United States	AT&T Center	—N/a	—N/a
February 11	New York City	United States	Blender Theatre at Gramercy	706 / 706 (100%)	$18,410
February 14	Upper Darby (Note: Labelled as Philadelphia in promotional material)	United States	Tower Theater	—N/a	—N/a
February 20^{[B]}	Uniondale (Note: Labelled as New York City in promotional material)	United States	Nassau Coliseum	—N/a	—N/a
March 21^{[C]}	Houston	United States	Reliant Stadium	—N/a	—N/a
April 5	London	England	O_{2} Shepherd's Bush Empire	—N/a	—N/a
August 14^{[D]}	Bethlehem	United States	Sands Riverplace	—N/a	—N/a
August 15^{[E]}	Indianapolis	United States	Hoosier Lottery Grandstand	—N/a	—N/a
August 21^{[F]}	Springfield	United States	State Fairgrounds Grandstand	—N/a	—N/a
August 22^{[G]}	Eureka (Note: Labelled as St. Louis in promotional material)	United States	Old Glory Amphitheatre	—N/a	—N/a
September 11^{[H]}	York	United States	Toyota Grandstand	—N/a	—N/a
September 18^{[I]}	Pomona	United States	Fairplex Park	—N/a	—N/a
September 19^{[J]}	Hutchinson	United States	Sprint Grandstand	—N/a	—N/a
October 10^{[K]}	Fresno	United States	Paul Paul Theater	—N/a	—N/a
TOTAL				2,862 / 3,400 (84%)	$85,102

Festivals and other miscellaneous performances

^{A} This concert was a part of the San Antonio Stock Show & Rodeo
^{B} This concert was a part of Pop-Con
^{C} This concert was a part of the Houston Livestock Show and Rodeo
^{D} This concert was a part of Musikfest
^{E} This concert was a part of the Indiana State Fair

^{F} This concert was a part of the Illinois State Fair
^{G} This concert was a part of the Starburst Summer Concert Series
^{H} This concert was a part of the York Fair
^{I} This concert was a part of the Los Angeles County Fair
^{J} This concert was a part of the Kansas State Fair
^{K} This concert was a part of the Big Fresno Fair

Cancellations and rescheduled shows

July 28, 2010	Harrington, Delaware	Exhibit Hall	Cancelled This event would've been part of the Delaware State Fair
July 29, 2010	Columbus, Ohio	Celeste Center	Cancelled
July 31, 2010	Holmdel Township, New Jersey	PNC Bank Arts Center	Cancelled This event would've been part of the Lilith Fair
August 1, 2010	Hartford, Connecticut	Comcast Theatre	Cancelled This event would've been part of the Lilith Fair
