= Kiss & Tell (Selena Gomez & the Scene album) =

2009 studio album by Selena Gomez & the Scene

Studio album by Selena Gomez & the Scene
- Released: September 29, 2009
- Recorded: July 2008 – June 2009
- Studios: The Flood Room (Los Angeles, California); Rondor Studio (Los Angeles, California); The Village (Los Angeles, California); SuperSpy Studios (Los Angeles, California); Safe House Studios (Dayton, Ohio); Definitive Sound Studios (Toronto, Canada); Studio La Chambre (Montreal, Canada); Skyline Studios (Los Angeles, California); Imagine This Studio (Toronto, Canada); Rocket Carousel Studio (Los Angeles, California); Cookie Jar Studios (Los Angeles, California); HP Studios (Malibu, California)
- Genres: Pop rock; electronic rock
- Length: 42:20
- Label: Hollywood
- Producers: Ted Bruner; Trey Vittetoe; John Fields; SuperSpy; Antonina Armato; Tim James; Devrim Karaoglu; Rob Wells; Shelly Peiken; Greg Wells; Toby Gad; Matthew Wilder

Selena Gomez & the Scene chronology
Kiss & Tell (2009)	A Year Without Rain (2010)

Singles from Kiss & Tell
- 1. "Falling Down" Released: August 25, 2009; 2. "Naturally" Released: December 11, 2009

Kiss & Tell is the debut studio album by American band Selena Gomez & the Scene. The album was released on September 29, 2009 through Hollywood Records. The album is composed mainly of pop rock and electronic rock, with Gomez citing bands such as Paramore and Forever the Sickest Kids as influences on the album. Ted Bruner and Trey Vittetoe worked extensively on the record with Gomez, producing multiple tracks. Gomez worked with Gina Schock on several songs for the album, while Rock Mafia produced two of the album's tracks.

Upon its release, Kiss & Tell received mixed to positive reviews from music critics. Some critics praised the album's "fun" nature, while others criticized Gomez's vocal performance. Gina Schock's work on the album received praise from multiple critics. The album was a commercial success, entering the top-ten of the Billboard 200 in the United States. It went on to sell over 900,000 copies in the country, making it the band's best-selling album to date. It was later certified Gold by the Recording Industry Association of America (RIAA). Kiss & Tell entered the top-twenty in the United Kingdom, and was Gomez's highest-charting album in the country until Revival (2015).

Kiss & Tell was preceded by the lead single "Falling Down", which was released in August 2009. The album was heavily promoted through the Disney Channel. "Naturally" was released as the second single, and is often regarded as the band's breakout hit. It peaked inside the top-ten of countries such as the United Kingdom. Kiss & Tell was promoted mainly through televised performances, with the band appearing on shows such as Dancing with the Stars to perform songs from the album. The group toured on their Selena Gomez & the Scene: Live in Concert tour throughout the United States in 2009 and 2010, performing both new and old songs.

== Development ==
Gomez became heavily involved with the Disney Channel in 2004, starring in her own sitcom and making various appearances on soundtracks. Gomez also contributed multiple songs to the soundtrack for her film Another Cinderella Story (2008), one of which was released as a promotional single. In April 2008, Gomez announced that she had signed a recording contract with Hollywood Records, who most notably had signed other Disney acts such as Miley Cyrus and Demi Lovato. She revealed to MTV News that she hoped to start a band as opposed to having a solo career. Gomez held auditions to find members for the band in Burbank, California. Greg Garman was selected as the band's drummer, Joey Clement played bass guitar, and Dane Forrest and Nick Foxer played the keyboard, with Foxer also providing background vocals. Foxer departed the band the following year for unknown reasons. Ethan Robers both played guitar and provided background vocals. Gomez worked on the project for over a year, with over one-hundred songs being considered for the album. Gomez later stated she went through so many tracks to ensure that both she and her fans could "relate" to the material. Gomez announced the band's name to be Selena Gomez & the Scene in August 2009, claiming "I named my band the Scene because a lot of people are making fun of me calling me a 'wannabe scene,' so I thought I would poke fun [at] that. If you can't beat 'em join 'em!"

While recording the album, Gomez began to learn how to play the guitar and drums, and later began to learn how to play the piano and take vocal lessons. She stated she hoped to "make people dance" with the music on the album. Gomez wrote a song titled "I'm Sorry" for the album, reportedly inspired by her relationship with Nick Jonas. Gomez claimed it would be the first song recorded for the album, and would be the only ballad featured; it was included on the album and renamed as "I Won't Apologize". She also recorded a song titled "Beautifully Disturbed", which she revealed in May 2009. On the song, Gomez said "It’s definitely a song that’s close to me because it’s a nickname I was given and it’s very sweet. It means that sometimes I can be negative like every person can be, but you've got to find the beauty in that." The song was not included on the album's final track listing. Gomez worked extensively with Ted Bruner and Trey Vittetoe on the album, who she claimed produced "the core" of the record. Gomez worked with The Go-Go's member Gina Schock on numerous songs, four of which were included on the album. She worked with Rock Mafia on the song "Naturally", the first of many collaborations between the three. "Falling Down" featured writing and production credits from Ted Bruner, Gina Schock and Trey Vittetoe.

"I Won't Apologize" was written by Gomez, and is her only writing credit on the album. During a live performance, Gomez said "I wrote this song because I feel like a lot of people tend to change themselves for – let’s be honest – a boy; and that’s what I did; and I never make that mistake again now. I’m sorry, I’m not what you wanted me to be, but I’m not gonna apologize for who I am." She later cited the song as her favorite on the album. "Tell Me Something I Don't Know" was originally released as a promotional single by Gomez in 2008, with Rock Mafia remixing the song for its appearance on Kiss & Tell. Gomez cited herself as a "huge" fan of Canadian singer Fefe Dobson, and later included a cover of her song "As a Blonde" on the record. Gomez cited "Crush" as one of her favorite songs on the album. "Falling Down" and "Stop & Erase" were the first two songs to be added to the album.

== Music and lyrics ==
"The fact that I can say I have a record is a dream come true to me but not possible if it weren't for you guys [...] The whole process is so much fun and very therapeutic; most of my friends are amazing musically so to step into that for a while has been an incredible experience for me."

— Gomez, on recording the album

The music found on Kiss & Tell is composed mainly of pop rock and electronic rock music. Gomez described the album as being "fun pop-rock" with "a dance beat to it." The album incorporates a wide variety of musical genres into its composition such as pop punk, Latin-influenced dance, mid-tempo bubblegum pop, new wave, and techno. The album's lyrical themes focus on the topics of love, fame, heartbreak, and freedom, among other. Gomez said the album was "what [she's] gone through with heartache, friendships, and things like that. I want my fans to know me a little bit better after they hear this record." Gomez felt the album was a "good start" to figuring out "where [she] wanted to be musically." Artists such as Paramore and Forever the Sickest Kids were cited as influences on the album.

"Kiss & Tell," the album's opening number is backed by "punkish" guitars, hand claps, and shouts of "Hey!" It was described as featuring "attitude" and "borrows equally from punk attitude and pop melody." "I Won't Apologize" lyrically sees Gomez refusing to apologize for the person that she is, and has been described as featuring an "emo pop" composition. "Falling Down" is an upbeat pop rock and dance-pop track which contains a strong use of drums and electric guitars mixed with predominant "bloopy synths". Gomez claimed the song was "about Hollywood and what people think about it and essentially how plastic it is sometimes." "I Promise You" is a mid-tempo soft rock-inspired song which focuses mainly on the use of a guitar and drums. Lyrically the song sees Gomez promising a lover they will stay together. "Crush" is a pop punk song that is also described as having an emo pop tone, and lyrically sees Gomez getting over a former lover. "Naturally" is an electropop song that features a "juicy and instantly memorable vocal hook." On the song, Gomez sings about how easily feelings for a lover come to her.

"The Way I Loved You" is cited as the sole ballad on the album, with Gomez claiming she will never love someone as much as her previous lover. "More" is an electronic rock song that features elements of pop music. "As a Blonde" sees Gomez expressing interest in trying different things and changing up her personality. "I Don't Miss You At All" has been compared to releases from Australian duo The Veronicas, with prominent elements of dance music. "Stop & Erase" is a dominant rock track that sees Gomez confronting a "mean girl" or bully. "I Got U" is a pop rock song with new wave elements that, according to Bill Lamb of About.com, is a "mix of sweetness and intensity that seems distinctively Selena Gomez." The remixed version of "Tell Me Something I Don't Know" is a more pop-oriented version than the original, and has been likened to early releases from Britney Spears.

== Release and artwork ==
The album was initially slated to be released in July 2009, though was pushed back for unknown reasons. Gomez confirmed the album's title to be Kiss & Tell on Twitter in August 2009. Radio Disney aired one song per day leading up to the album's release, with the songs "Kiss & Tell", "Naturally", "Crush", "I Promise You", and "More" making their premiere on the station. The full album premiered on the station on September 26, with a re-broadcast the following day. Kiss & Tell was released physically and to digital retailers on September 29, 2009 in North America. Gomez filmed a mini-series during the recording of the album which chronicled the recording of the album, band auditions, and the photo shoot for the album's artwork; the eight episodes were posted via Gomez's official YouTube channel. The Target exclusive version of the album also featured a special video chronicling the creation of the album. The album was not released in countries such as Japan and the United Kingdom until 2010, following the success of the album's second single "Naturally".

The main cover for the album is a close-up of Gomez with a pink heart made of rhinestones covering her lips. Gomez stated the idea for the cover was her idea, and she wanted the album to have a colorful cover. The album's packaging in European territories saw a different cover, with this one seeing Gomez pose with a red polka-dot wall behind her. The Japanese edition also features a different cover, a close-up of Gomez's face with a dark background. All three of the album covers feature the same logo, with a heart in the center of "Selena Gomez & the Scene". The back cover on the album sees Gomez with her band in the background, and features minimal coloring in contrast to the front cover; the text listing the songs on the album is written in pink. The album's booklet features various colors and themes, and focuses namely on Gomez as opposed to the full band. The shots in the booklet are fashion-oriented, with Gomez sporting various dresses and outfits in the images.

== Promotion ==
The album received much promotion through Disney Channel and Radio Disney, the former of which aired the band's music videos. The group had their first televised performance on Dancing with the Stars on September 29, 2009, where they performed "Falling Down". Derek Hough and Karina Smirnoff performed a choreographed dance while the band played the song. Gomez and her band performed "Naturally" on The Ellen DeGeneres Show on December 11, 2009. The band was selected to be MTV Push artists, and performed "Falling Down", "Naturally", "Kiss & Tell", "Tell Me Something I Don't Know", and "The Way I Loved You" in an online concert. Multiple songs from the album were performed at the 2009 Teletón in Mexico. Gomez performed both "Naturally" and "More" on Dick Clark's New Year's Rockin' Eve with Ryan Seacrest on January 1, 2010. She also appeared on stage with Justin Bieber while he performed his song "One Less Lonely Girl" (2009). Gomez and The Scene later performed at PopCon with Bieber in February 2010. "Naturally" and "More" were again performed on Good Morning America on February 11, 2010. During the week of the album's release in the United Kingdom, the band went on a promotional tour in the country. The group performed "Naturally" on GMTV on April 5, 2010, and again on Studio Five the following day. The band embarked on their Selena Gomez & the Scene: Live in Concert tour in 2009. The tour saw all of the album's tracks being performed, excluding "As a Blonde" and "I Got U". Consisting mainly of festivals and fairs, the tour had nineteen shows over the span of November 2009 to October 2010. There were an additional four shows to the concert that were cancelled due to illness. Later dates in the concert saw the band performing songs from their then-unreleased sophomore album. The tour was a financial success.

== Singles ==
"Falling Down" was released as the lead single from the album in August 2009. The song was not released for radio airplay, though was heavily promoted through the Disney Channel. The song received a generally positive reception from critics, though failed to have commercial success in North America. The song sold over 500,000 copies as of 2014 in the US.It went on to reach the top-twenty in Japan, peaking at number fifteen. "Naturally" was released as the second and final single from the album in December 2009. The song served as the lead single in most European territories, and went on to become the band's first major hit. With heavy promotion through Disney and performances, the song had success on radio and with sales. It had mainstream success in multiple countries, and is often considered the band's breakout hit.

== Critical reception ==
Professional ratings
Review scores
Source	Rating
About.com	4/5 stars
Allmusic	4/5 stars
BBC News	4/5 stars
Billboard	50/100
Digital Spy	2/5 stars
Entertainment Weekly	(D)
The Guardian	3/5 stars

Kiss & Tell received mixed-to-positive reviews by the music critics, Bill Lamb of About.com gave the album a generally positive review, stating "There is an energy and excitement here that is positively infectious. The lyrical subjects here are no surprise for a teen artist, but it is Gomez' delivery that makes the music fresh and fun." Tim Sendra of Allmusic described the album as "near-genius modern pop" which "show[ed] off Gomez's light but surprisingly soulful vocals in a near-perfect setting. The producers and writing teams involved frame Gomez as a tougher, sassier version of the usual tween pop singer and keep the sappy ballads to a bare minimum." BBC News in Great Britain praised the album, describing it as "fast and full of energy." They went on to praise "Crush", "I Promise You", and "Falling Down". Bob Smithouser of Pluggedin felt the album had a "sassy pop-rock" sound, and added "she spends much of [the album] ranting, venting and assuring those self-absorbed, two-timing cads that she’s already over them." Sputnikmusic praised tracks such as "I Got U" and "Kiss & Tell", though criticized the music videos for "Falling Down" and "Naturally" for being too boring.

Michael Hann of The Guardian gave the album a mixed review, stating "If the lyrics were half as inventive as the tunes, these Disney powerpop albums would be classics; as it is, though, they'll have to settle for being great fun." Common Sense Media said the album was "a typical tween album, giving clean accounts of common tween concerns like falling in love and following your dreams" and later labeled it "uninspired". Mikael Wood of Billboard said Gomez's music "could use more of her in it" if she hoped to have further success in music, though praised songs such as "Naturally" and "Kiss & Tell". Entertainment Weekly criticized the album, namely Gomez's vocal performance, stating Gomez had "no vocal chops" and adding "all the slick production in the world can't erase the 'Mom! Where's my allowance money?' whine she mistakes for Avril-esque attitude". Rober Copsey of Digital Spy gave a negative review of the album, commenting "unfortunately, the catchy hooks that anchor 'Naturally' are often M.I.A elsewhere on the album, with many songs coming off as saccharine, forgettable Miley Cyrus/Avril Lavigne/Pink hybrids."

== Commercial performance ==
Kiss & Tell debuted at number nine on the Billboard 200 chart in the United States, with first week sales of 66,000 copies. The album was a mere 75 copies behind Miranda Lambert's Revolution, which sat at number eight on the chart. During its second week of release, the album dropped to number twenty-five on the chart. In February 2010, it was reported that the album had sold an estimated 387,000 copies in the United States; it had spent eighteen weeks on the chart. The album was certified Gold by the RIAA in March 2010, denoting sales exceeding 500,000 copies in the United States. The album spent a total of fifty-nine weeks on the Billboard 200, which was Gomez's longest charting record until Revival (2015). The album appeared on the Billboard 2009 Year-End chart at number 187, having been released three months prior. The following year, the album appeared at number 47 on the chart. The album has sold over 924,000 copies till date.

The album debuted at number twenty-two on the Canadian Albums Chart. The album went on to sell over 40,000 copies in the country, earning it a Gold certification from the CRIA. Kiss & Tell remains the band's only album to not enter the top-ten in the country. The album entered the UK Albums Chart at number 12, propelled by the top-ten success of "Naturally" (2010). It sold over 60,000 copies in the United Kingdom, earning it a Silver certification from BPI. It had a similar performance in Ireland, reaching number fourteen on the chart. The album failed to chart on the ARIA Charts but charted on the component Australian Hitseekers albums chart at number four. Kiss & Tell peaked at number twenty-one in New Zealand, the band's only album to peak outside of the top-twenty. The album entered at number nineteen in Germany, led by the sudden radio success of "Naturally". The album peaked at number ten in Argentina, and earned a Gold certification.

== Track listing ==
Kiss & Tell track listing
No.	Title	Writer(s)	Producer(s)	Length
1.	"Kiss & Tell"	Ted Bruner; Trey Vittetoe; Gina Schock	Bruner; Vittetoe	3:17
2.	"I Won't Apologize"	Selena Gomez; John Fields; William James McAuley III	Fields	3:06
3.	"Falling Down"	Bruner; Vittetoe; Schock	Bruner; Vittetoe	3:05
4.	"I Promise You"	Isaac Hasson; Lindy Robbins; Mher Filian	SuperSpy	3:20
5.	"Crush"	Bruner; Vittetoe; Schock	Bruner; Vittetoe	3:19
6.	"Naturally"	Antonina Armato; Tim James; Devrim Karaoglu	Armato; James; Karaoglu^{[b]}	3:22
7.	"The Way I Loved You"	Shelly Peiken; Rob Wells	R. Wells^{[a]}; Peiken^{[c]}	3:33
8.	"More"	Hasson; Robbins; Filian	SuperSpy	3:30
9.	"As a Blonde"	Peiken; Greg Wells; Fefe Dobson	G. Wells	2:47
10.	"I Don't Miss You at All"	Robbins; Toby Gad	Gad	3:40
11.	"Stop & Erase"	Bruner; Vittetoe; Schock	Bruner; Vittetoe	2:52
12.	"I Got U"	Matthew Wilder; Tamara Dunn	Wilder	3:34
13.	"Tell Me Something I Don't Know"	Ralph Churchwell; Michael Nielsen; Armato	Armato; James; Karaoglu^{[b]}	2:55
Total length:				42:20

Notes

- ^{^[a]} signifies a producer and vocal producer
- ^{^[b]} signifies a co-producer
- ^{^[c]} signifies a vocal producer
- ^{^[d]} signifies a remixer
- The Japanese edition includes the bonus remix track "Falling Down" (Plug in Language Remix) as track 14.
- The international edition includes the bonus remix track "Naturally" (Dave Audé Radio Remix) as track 14.
- The Target and Japanese deluxe edition includes a bonus DVD which features the making of "Kiss & Tell", the music video of "Falling Down", and a photo gallery.

== Personnel ==
- Selena Gomez – lead vocals (all tracks), background vocals (track 6, 10, 12, 13)
- Trey Vittetoe – production, engineering & instruments (tracks 1, 3, 5, 11)
- Ted Bruner – production & engineering (tracks 1, 3, 5, 11)
- John Fields – production, programming, mixing, recording, guitar, bass, drums & keyboards (track 2)
- Isaac Hasson – programming, guitar, bass & keyboards (tracks 4, 8)
- Clif Norrell – mixing (tracks 1, 3–5, 8, 11)
- Rob Wells – production, vocal production, engineering, recording, programming & instruments (track 7)
- Greg Wells – production, mixing, drums, guitar, bass & synth (track 9)
- Toby Gad – production, mixing, programming, arrangement & instruments (track 10)
- Josh Freese – drums (tracks 1, 3, 5, 11)
- Ghian Wright – drum engineering (tracks 1, 3, 5, 11)
- SuperSpy – production & engineering (tracks 4, 8)
- Mher Filian – programming & keyboards (tracks 4, 8)
- Tim James – production & mixing (tracks 6, 13)
- Fred St-Gelais – guitar, bass, additional engineering & additional recording (track 7)
- Matthew Wilder – production, mixing, recording & instruments (track 12)
- Dorian Crozier – drums (track 2, 4), engineering assistance (track 4)
- Chris Anderson – mixing, additional engineering & additional recording (track 7)
- Lindy Robbins – background vocals (tracks 4, 8)
- Antonina Armato – production (tracks 6, 13)
- Adam Comstock – engineering (tracks 6, 13)
- Steve Hammons – engineering (tracks 6, 13)
- Nigel Lundemo – engineering (tracks 6, 13)
- Paul Palmer – mixing (tracks 6, 13)
- Devrim Karaoglu – co-production (tracks 6, 13)
- Paul David Hager – mixing (track 2)
- Bleu – vocals (track 2)
- Jimmy Messer – guitar (track 6)
- Brooke Adams – additional background vocals (track 6)
- Shelly Peiken – vocal production (track 7)
- Katia Zuccarelli – background vocals (track 7)
- Greg Johnston – additional guitar (track 7)
- Luke Tozour – recording (track 9)
- Fefe Dobson – background vocals (track 9)
- Gina Schock – background vocals (track 11)
- Julia Harriman – background vocals (track 12)
- Sean Hurley – bass (track 13)
- Tim Pierce – guitar (track 13)
- Char Licera – additional background vocals (track 13)

Credits

- Robert Vosgien – mastering
- David Snow – creative director
- Miranda Penn-Turin – photography
- Jeri Heiden – art direction
- Nick Steinhardt – design

== Charts ==
=== Weekly charts ===
Weekly chart performance for Kiss & Tell
Chart (2009–2010)	Peak
Australian Albums (ARIA)	101
Austrian Albums (Ö3 Austria)	4
Belgian Albums (Ultratop Flanders)	22
Belgian Albums (Ultratop Wallonia)	26
Canadian Albums (Billboard)	22
Dutch Albums (Album Top 100)	87
French Albums (SNEP)	24
German Albums (Offizielle Top 100)	19
Greek Albums (IFPI Greece)	2
Irish Albums (IRMA)	14
Italian Albums (FIMI)	33
Japanese Albums (Oricon)	70
Mexican Albums (AMPROFON)	20
New Zealand Albums (RMNZ)	21
Norwegian Albums (VG-lista)	38
Polish Albums (ZPAV)	4
South Korean Albums (Gaon)	91
South Korean International Albums (Gaon)	18
Spanish Albums (Promusicae)	2
Swiss Albums (Schweizer Hitparade)	36
UK Albums (Official Charts)	12
US Billboard 200	9

=== Year-end charts ===
2009 year-end chart performance for Kiss & Tell
Chart (2009)	Position
US Billboard 200	187

2010 year-end chart performance for Kiss & Tell
Chart (2010)	Position
Spanish Albums (PROMUSICAE)	28
US Billboard 200	47

== Certifications and sales ==
Certifications and sales for Kiss & Tell
Region	Certification	Certified units/sales
Argentina (CAPIF)	Gold	20,000^{^}
Austria (IFPI Austria)	Gold	10,000^{*}
Brazil (Pro-Música Brasil)	Gold	30,000^{*}
Canada (Music Canada)	Gold	40,000^{^}
United Kingdom (BPI)	Silver	60,000^{^}
United States (RIAA)	Platinum	930,000
^{*} Sales figures based on certification alone.^{^} Shipments figures based on certification alone.

== Release history ==
Release dates for Kiss & Tell
Region	Date	Label	Format	Catalog
Canada	September 29, 2009	Hollywood Records	CD, digital download	D000283102
United States	September 29, 2009	Hollywood Records	CD, digital download	D000283102
Australia	October 16, 2009	Universal Music	CD, digital download	D000283102
Japan	February 24, 2010	Avex Group	CD, CD+DVD, digital download	AVCW-13120 (CD), AVCW-13119B (CD+DVD)
India	April 3, 2010	Universal Music	CD	D000283102
United Kingdom	April 19, 2010	Fascination Records	CD, digital download	D000575702
France	May 3, 2010	Fascination Records	CD, digital download	D000575702
