= 37th People's Choice Awards =

Pop culture award show held in 2011

- Date: January 5, 2011
- Location: Nokia Theatre, Los Angeles, California
- Hosted by: Queen Latifah

Television/radio coverage
- Network: CBS

The 37th People's Choice Awards, honoring the best in popular culture for 2010, were held on January 5, 2011, at the Nokia Theatre in Los Angeles, California, and were broadcast live on CBS at 9:00 pm ET. Queen Latifah was the host for the fifth consecutive year.

== Performers ==
- Queen Latifah – "Dynamite" (with Taio Cruz's vocals)
- Selena Gomez & the Scene – "A Year Without Rain"
- Kid Rock – "God Bless Saturday"

== Presenters ==
- Jennifer Aniston
- Ben Rappaport
- Mila Kunis
- Emma Roberts
- Kate Walsh
- Taye Diggs
- Jim Parsons
- Miranda Cosgrove
- Minka Kelly
- Pauley Perrette
- Stephen Moyer
- Malin Akerman
- Julie Bowen
- Michael Chiklis
- Ashton Kutcher
- Natalie Portman
- Zachary Levi
- AnnaLynne McCord
- Jerry O'Connell
- Brian Palatucci

== Nominees ==
Winners are listed in bold.

=== Film ===
Favorite Movie	Favorite Action Movie
Alice in Wonderland; Inception; Iron Man 2; Toy Story 3; **The Twilight Saga: Eclipse**	**Iron Man 2**; Kick-Ass; Prince of Persia: The Sands of Time; Robin Hood; Salt
Favorite Comedy Movie	Favorite Drama Movie
Date Night; Easy A; **Grown Ups**; Sex and the City 2; Valentine's Day	Alice in Wonderland; Dear John; Inception; The Social Network; **The Twilight Saga: Eclipse**
Favorite Family Movie	Favorite Horror Movie
Despicable Me; How to Train Your Dragon; The Karate Kid; Shrek Forever After; **Toy Story 3**	The Crazies; The Last Exorcism; Let Me In; **A Nightmare on Elm Street**; Resident Evil: Afterlife
Favorite Movie Actor	Favorite Movie Actress
**Johnny Depp**, Alice in Wonderland; Leonardo DiCaprio, Inception & Shutter Island; Robert Downey Jr., Iron Man 2; Taylor Lautner, The Twilight Saga: Eclipse & Valentine's Day; Robert Pattinson, Remember Me & The Twilight Saga: Eclipse	Jennifer Aniston, The Bounty Hunter & The Switch; Angelina Jolie, Salt; Katherine Heigl, Killers & Life as We Know It; Julia Roberts, Eat Pray Love & Valentine's Day; **Kristen Stewart**, The Runaways & The Twilight Saga: Eclipse
Favorite Action Star	Favorite Comedic Star
**Jackie Chan**, The Karate Kid; Bradley Cooper, The A-Team; Robert Downey Jr., Iron Man 2; Jake Gyllenhaal, Prince of Persia: The Sands of Time; Angelina Jolie, Salt	Drew Barrymore, Going the Distance; Steve Carell, Date Night & Dinner for Schmucks; Tina Fey, Date Night; Will Ferrell, The Other Guys; **Adam Sandler**, Grown Ups
Favorite On-Screen Team	Favorite Movie Star Under 25
Tina Fey & Steve Carell, Date Night; Leonardo DiCaprio, Joseph Gordon-Levitt, Elliot Page, (Note: Credited as Ellen Page) Tom Hardy & Dileep Rao, Inception; Robert Downey Jr. & Don Cheadle, Iron Man 2; Jaden Smith & Jackie Chan, The Karate Kid; **Robert Pattinson, Kristen Stewart, & Taylor Lautner**, The Twilight Saga: Eclipse	Emma Watson; Kristen Stewart; Robert Pattinson; Vanessa Hudgens; **Zac Efron**

=== Television ===
Favorite TV Comedy	Favorite TV Drama
The Big Bang Theory; **Glee**; How I Met Your Mother; Modern Family; Two and a Half Men	The Good Wife; Gossip Girl; Grey's Anatomy; **House**; The Vampire Diaries
Favorite TV Comedy Actor	Favorite TV Comedy Actress
Alec Baldwin, 30 Rock; Jim Parsons, The Big Bang Theory; Matthew Morrison, Glee; **Neil Patrick Harris**, How I Met Your Mother; Steve Carell, The Office	Alyson Hannigan, How I Met Your Mother; Courteney Cox, Cougar Town; Eva Longoria Parker, Desperate Housewives; **Jane Lynch**, Glee; Tina Fey, 30 Rock
Favorite TV Drama Actor	Favorite TV Drama Actress
Chace Crawford, Gossip Girl; **Hugh Laurie**, House; Ian Somerhalder, The Vampire Diaries; Patrick Dempsey, Grey's Anatomy; Taye Diggs, Private Practice	Blake Lively, Gossip Girl; Julianna Margulies, The Good Wife; Kate Walsh, Private Practice; **Lisa Edelstein**, House; Sandra Oh, Grey's Anatomy
Favorite TV Crime Drama	Favorite TV Crime Fighter
Bones; Criminal Minds; Law & Order: Special Victims Unit; **Lie to Me**; NCIS	Emily Deschanel, Bones; Mariska Hargitay, Law & Order: Special Victims Unit; Mark Harmon, NCIS; Simon Baker, The Mentalist; **Tim Roth**, Lie to Me
Favorite TV Sci-Fi/Fantasy Show	Favorite Competition Show
**Fringe**; Smallville; Supernatural; True Blood; The Vampire Diaries	America's Got Talent; **American Idol**; Dancing with the Stars; Hell's Kitchen; So You Think You Can Dance
Favorite New TV Comedy	Favorite New TV Drama
$#*! My Dad Says; Better with You; Mike & Molly; Outsourced; Raising Hope	The Event; **Hawaii Five-0**; Hellcats; Nikita; No Ordinary Family
Favorite TV Doctor	Favorite TV Family
Cristina Yang (Sandra Oh); Derek Shepherd (Patrick Dempsey); **Gregory House (Hugh Laurie)**; James Wilson (Robert Sean Leonard); Meredith Grey (Ellen Pompeo)	The Griffins, Family Guy; The Harpers, Two and a Half Men; The Pritchetts/Dunphys, Modern Family; The Scavos, Desperate Housewives; **The Simpsons**, The Simpsons
Favorite TV Obsession	Favorite TV Guest Star
Burn Notice; **Dexter**; Pretty Little Liars; True Blood; White Collar	Betty White, Community; Britney Spears, Glee; Carrie Underwood, How I Met Your Mother; **Demi Lovato**, Grey's Anatomy; Neil Patrick Harris, Glee
Favorite Talk Show Host	Favorite TV Chef
Chelsea Handler; **Conan O'Brien**; Ellen DeGeneres; George Lopez; Oprah Winfrey	Bobby Flay; Gordon Ramsay; Jamie Oliver; Paula Deen; **Rachael Ray**
Favorite TV Guilty Pleasure	Favorite Family TV Movie
Jersey Shore; Kathy Griffin: My Life on the D-List; **Keeping Up with the Kardashians**; The Real Housewives of New Jersey; Tosh.O	Beauty & the Briefcase; **Camp Rock 2: The Final Jam**; iCarly: iPsycho; Revenge of the Bridesmaids; Starstruck

=== Music ===
Favorite Song	Favorite Music Video
"Airplanes" by B.o.B featuring Hayley Williams of Paramore; "California Gurls" by Katy Perry featuring Snoop Dogg; **"Love The Way You Lie"** by **Eminem** featuring **Rihanna**; "OMG", by Usher featuring will.i.am; "Telephone" by Lady Gaga featuring Beyoncé	"Baby" by Justin Bieber featuring Ludacris; **"Love the Way You Lie"** by **Eminem** featuring **Rihanna**; "Teenage Dream" by Katy Perry; "Telephone" by Lady Gaga featuring Beyoncé; "Waka Waka" by Shakira featuring Freshlyground
Favorite Male Artist	Favorite Female Artist
**Eminem**; Enrique Iglesias; Michael Bublé; Tim McGraw; Usher	Carrie Underwood; **Katy Perry**; Lady Gaga; P!nk; Taylor Swift
Favorite Rock Band	Favorite Breakout Artist
Daughtry; Linkin Park; Maroon 5; Nickelback; **Paramore**	B.o.B.; Bruno Mars; Justin Bieber; Ke$ha; **Selena Gomez & the Scene**
Favorite Pop Artist	Favorite Country Artist
Beyoncé; Katy Perry; Lady Gaga; **Rihanna**; P!nk	Carrie Underwood; Keith Urban; Lady Antebellum; Rascal Flatts; **Taylor Swift**
Favorite R&B Artist	Favorite Hip-Hop Artist
Alicia Keys; Beyoncé; Mary J. Blige; Ne-Yo; **Usher**	Drake; **Eminem**; Jay-Z; Ludacris; Snoop Dogg

=== Web ===
Favorite Online Sensation	Favorite Viral Video Star
Alicia Keys; Betty White; Jimmy Fallon; **Katy Perry**; Teri Hatcher	Giant Double Rainbow; Greyson Chance "Paparazzi"; Madison Sq. Park Proposal; **"Single Ladies" Devastation**; Tarp Surfing
