= Borderfest =

- Borderfest mascot at Borderfest 2008
- Frequency: annual
- Location: Hidalgo, Texas
- Inaugurated: 1975

Borderfest is an Annual Festival held in Hidalgo, Texas. The first Borderfest ever held was in 1976. It is the largest and oldest music festival in South Texas; and includes a variety of foods and cultures from around the world.

== History ==
Borderfest started in 1976 as a committee of the Hidalgo Chamber of Commerce to promote cultural, international and community spirit. The initial event was a small community festival lasting one day and drawing some 500 people. Today, the festival has grown.

Annually the festival Donates $40,000 to $50,000 for local scholarships.

== Mission ==
Borderfest's mission is dedicated to cultural enrichment, arts education and heritage preservation in South Texas. BorderFest celebrates the diverse cultures that make the Rio Grande Valley unique and is an opportunity to share, preserve and showcase South Texas heritage through education, music, dance, cultural activities, and family fun.

== Gallery ==
Borderfest mascot at Borderfest 2008

An elvis impersonator performing at Borderfest 2008 while the Green Ghost looks on
