= List of performers at the York State Fair =

Notable entertainers at the York Fair in Pennsylvania, U.S.

The York State Fair is a ten-day fair held in July/August in York, Pennsylvania. Formerly known as the York Fair and held in September, it was renamed and rescheduled for 2020, though it was canceled that year due to the COVID-19 pandemic. It is one of the oldest fairs in the country, tracing its roots to 1765. Fair organizers reported a record attendance in 2012 of over 640,000. Since the 1960s, the fair has drawn a broad set of notable musicians and comedians, listed here by year of performance.

== List ==
Previous decades
1960s performers

1960
- Liberace
- Pat Boone

1961
- Dion
- Johnny and the Hurricanes
- Little Anthony and the Imperials
- The Regents

1962
- Jimmy Durante
- Ricky Nelson

1963
- Anita Bryant and "Bullwinkle"
- Guy Lombardo and Dennis Day
- Myron Floren and Jo Ann Castle
- Frank Fontaine

1964
- Connie Francis
- Harry James

1965
- Eydie Gormé
- The Animals
- The Kingston Trio

1966
- Brenda Lee
- Gary Lewis & the Playboys

1967
- Johnny Tillotson
- The Critters

1968
- Bobby Vinton
- James Brown and his Fabulous Flames

1969
- The Cowsills
- Jimmy Dean

1970s performers

1970
- Hank Williams Jr.
- The Banana Splits
- The Vogues

1971
- Archie Campbell, Grandpa Jones, Lester Flatt, Loretta Lynn, Dolly Parton, and Porter Wagoner
- Lynn Anderson
- Roy Rogers and Dale Evans

1972
- Del Reeves
- Sonny and Cher
- Tex Ritter

1973
- Bob Hope
- Boots Randolph and Bobby Goldsboro

1974
- Bobby Vinton
- Tony Orlando and Dawn

1975
- Sha Na Na
- Lynn Anderson
- Duke Ellington Orchestra
- Glenn Miller Orchestra

1976
- Paul Revere and the Raiders
- Frankie Valli and the Four Seasons
- Red Skelton and Lynn Anderson
- Mac Davis
- Tanya Tucker
- Kip Addotta

1977
- Bobby Vinton
- Mel Tillis and Freddy Fender
- Marilyn McCoo and Billy Davis Jr.
- The Sylvers and Starbuck

1978
- The Statler Brothers
- B. J. Thomas
- Pat and Debby Boone

1979
- Chubby Checker
- The Oak Ridge Boys and Stella Parton
- Leif Garrett
- Orleans
- Peaches and Herb
- Sister Sledge
- The Shirelles
- The Vogues

1980s performers

1980
- Bill Cosby
- The Charlie Daniels Band

1981
- Air Supply
- Johnny Cash
- The Statler Brothers
- Willie Nelson
- John Schneider and Brenda Lee
- Bluegrass Festival with The Dillards, John Hartford, and local bands
- International Circus

1982
- Willie Nelson
- Rick Springfield

1983
- Kenny Rogers
- Eddie Rabbitt and Louise Mandrell
- Cheap Trick
- Stevie Ray Vaughan
- The Greg Kihn Band

1984
- The Osmonds
- The Go-Gos

1985
- Engelbert Humperdinck
- The Judds
- The Golden Boys of Bandstand featuring Fabian, Frankie Avalon, and Bobby Rydell

1986
- Alabama
- Willie Nelson
- The Statler Brothers

1987
- Tom Jones
- Chicago
- Kool and the Gang
- Lee Greenwood and George Jones

1988
- Gloria Estefan and The Miami Sound Machine
- Otis Day and the Knights
- Spencer Davis
- Steppenwolf
- Tiffany
- The Tokens

1989
- Tiny Tim
- 38 Special
- New Kids On The Block

1990s performers

1990
- Reba McEntire
- Sweethearts of the Rodeo
- Battle of the Bands: Sahara, The Morris Brothers Band, Savage Bliss, Johnny's Secret, Wired, B.C. Roberts, Hyde Your Daughters, and Public Affection

1991
- The Statler Brothers
- Frankie Valli and the Four Seasons
- Kix
- Sandi Patti
- Alabama
- Garth Brooks with Trisha Yearwood

1992
- Clint Black
- The Turtles
- The Mamas and the Papas
- The Grass Roots

1993
- Garth Brooks with Stephanie Davis
- Billy Ray Cyrus
- Alan Jackson with Allen Collin
- Petra with Cindy Morgan
1994
- Brooks and Dunn with Martina McBride
- Alan Jackson with Faith Hill
- Kix

1995
- Boyz II Men
- Alabama

1996
- Julio Iglesias
- Michael Bolton
- The Corrs
- Alan Jackson with Wade Hayes
- Vince Gill

1997
- Alan Jackson with Mindy McCready
- Alabama with Rick Trevino
- Musicfest with Goo Goo Dolls and Seven Mary Three
- INXS
- Vince Gill
- Kenny Chesney
- Tanya Tucker with John Berry
- LeAnn Rimes
- Bryan White
- 4Him and Point of Grace

1998
- Backstreet Boys
- Lynyrd Skynyrd
- The Badlees

1999
- Britney Spears with 98 Degrees
- Def Leppard
- Brad Paisley
- Sawyer Brown

2000s performers

2000
- Travis Tritt
- Sammy Kershaw
- REO Speedwagon
- Doobie Brothers

2001
- Brooks & Dunn
- Kenny Chesney and Lee Ann Womack
- Journey
- O-Town
- Ted Nugent
- Alabama
- Night Ranger
- 3 Doors Down with Nickelback

2002
- Foreigner
- Jeff Foxworthy
- Aaron Carter
- Rascal Flatts
- Toby Keith

2003
- Poison
- Wynonna Judd
- The Platters and The Coasters
- The Drifters

2004
- Bowling For Soup
- Lonestar with Buddy Jewell
- Clay Aiken
- Live
- Lynyrd Skynyrd
- Kid Rock
- Negative Space
- Parade of high school bands

2005
- The Allman Brothers Band
- Gretchen Wilson
- Tim McGraw

2006
- Carrie Underwood
- Brad Paisley
- Larry the Cable Guy
- Staind
- Styx

2007
- Daughtry
- Bill Engvall
- Carrie Underwood
- Josh Gracin/Trace Adkins
- Lynyrd Skynyrd
- Hinder with Papa Roach, Buckcherry and Rev Theory
- Randy Owen (of Alabama)
- Trace Adkins
- Willie Nelson

2008
- ZZ Top
- Larry the Cable Guy
- Daughtry
- Breaking Benjamin with Seether
- Brooks & Dunn (cancelled)
- Danity Kane (cancelled)
- Blake Shelton
- Miranda Lambert
- Gavin DeGraw

2009
- Trace Adkins
- Kelly Clarkson
- David Cook
- Alice Cooper
- Jeff Dunham
- Trapt
- Halestorm
- Pop Evil

2010s performers

2010
- Lady Antebellum and Love and Theft
- Selena Gomez and Allstar Weekend
- Shinedown and Rev Theory and Sore Eyes
- Seether and Hinder and Black Stone Cherry
- TNA Wrestling
- Jason Aldean and Uncle Kracker
- Terry Fator

2011
- Big Time Rush
- Joan Jett & The Blackhearts
- Toby Keith with Eric Church
- TNA Wrestling
- 3 Doors Down
- Greyson Chance and Cody Simpson

2012

Grandstand:
- R5, Shane Cover
- Luke Bryan with Easton Corbin
- Blake Shelton with Sunny Sweeney
- REO Speedwagon
- Jeff Dunham
- Allstar Weekend with New Hollow
Great Country Radio Stage (sponsored by WGTY):

JT Hodges, Andy Gibson, Randy Houser, Casey James, Thomas Rhett, Kristen Kelly, Dustin Lynch, Greg Bates, The Farm, Lauren Alaina, Due West, Katie Armiger

2013
- Halestorm
- Tom Keifer
- Florida Georgia Line
- Colt Ford
- The Marshall Tucker Band
- The Outlaws
- Lauren Alaina
- Alan Jackson
- Austin Mahone
- Coco Jones
2014

Grandstand:
- Jeff Dunham
- Hunter Hayes
- Jackyl with Molly Hatchet
- Lady Antebellum with Joe Nichols
- McClain
Great Country Radio Stage:

Dakota Bradley and Sam Hunt, Brothers Osborne and Josh Thompson, Chase Rice, Lucy Hale, John King, Maggie Rose, Canaan Smith, Jamie Lynn Spears, The Swon Brothers, Austin Webb and Jana Kramer

2015

Grandstand:
- Alabama
- Brantley Gilbert with A Thousand Horses
- Andy Grammer and American Authors
- John Kay & Steppenwolf with Foghat
- Cole Swindell
Great Country Radio Stage:

Kelsea Ballerini, Brothers Osborne, Chase Bryant, Cam, Chris Janson, LoCash, Mo Pitney, Canaan Smith, Drake White

2016

Grandstand:
- Alabama
- Jeff Dunham
- Tyler Farr
- Chase Rice with Parmalee
- Salt-N-Pepa, Vanilla Ice, Coolio, Tone Lōc, Young MC and Color Me Badd
Radio Stage:

Runaway June and Lauren Alaina, Trent Harmon, Jordan Rager, Michael Ray, Craig Campbell, Brooke Eden, Jerrod Niemann, High Valley, Brett Young, Dylan Scott

2017

Grandstand:
- Frankie Ballard, Michael Ray, and Danielle Bradbery
- Jeff Foxworthy and Larry the Cable Guy
- Lynyrd Skynyrd
- Thomas Rhett
Radio Stage:

William Michael Morgan, Adam Craig, High Valley, Luke Combs, Midland, Seth Ennis, Jordan Davis, Canaan Smith

2018

Grandstand:
- 5 Seconds of Summer, with The Aces
- Alice Cooper
- American Idol Live! 2018, with Forever in Your Mind
- Gabriel "Fluffy" Iglesias
- MercyMe
- Old Dominion, with Walker Hayes
- Sesame Street Live
Radio Stage:

Trent Harmon, Jordan Davis, LANCO, Lindsay Ell, William Michael Morgan (replaced Morgan Evans), Jimmie Allen, Dylan Schneider, Joe Nichols, Mitchell Tenpenny

2019

Grandstand:
- Bethel Music
- Darci Lynne
- Brantley Gilbert
- Kent McCord
- Brad Paisley
- Tesla, Jackyl, and KIX
- Travis Tritt and the Charlie Daniels Band
Radio Stage:

Jimmie Allen, Drew Baldridge, Gabby Barrett, Tyler Farr, Hardy, Walker Hayes, High Valley, Ryan Hurd, Seaforth, Matt Stell

2020s performers

2020

canceled due to the COVID-19 pandemic

2021

Grandstand:
- Alabama with Jake Hoot
- Blippi the Musical
- Kane Brown with Adam Doleac and Restless Road
- Casting Crowns
- Halestorm
- Jake Owen with Chase Rice
- REO Speedwagon and Styx
- Warrant and Slaughter with KIX
Radio Stage:

Tenille Arts, Callista Clark, Travis Denning, Morgan Evans, Riley Green, Caroline Jones, Kameron Marlowe, Joe Nichols, Robyn Ottolini, Parmalee, Jameson Rodgers, Runaway June, Matt Stell, and Lainey Wilson

2022

Grandstand:
- Jason Aldean with Gabby Barrett and John Morgan
- Tracy Byrd with HunterGirl
- Docken Lynch Reunion Tour with Vixen and Autograph
- Foreigner with Tommy DeCarlo of Boston
- For King & Country with Zach Williams
- Sam Hunt
- Gabriel "Fluffy" Iglesias
- KIX
Radio Stage:

Chayce Beckham, Callista Clark, Jackson Dean, Ernest, Ben Gallaher, Ryan Hurd, Kameron Marlowe, Niko Moon, Joe Nichols, Frank Ray, Restless Road

2023

Grandstand:
- Dierks Bentley with Ingrid Andress and Wyatt McCubbin
- Five Finger Death Punch
- KIX
- Vince Neil and Stephen Pearcy with Quiet Riot
- Nelly
- Peppa Pig
- Turnpike Troubadours
- Tyler Hubbard with Megan Moroney
- We the Kingdom with Anne Wilson
Radio Stage:

Tenille Arts, Dierks Bentley & Hot Country Knights, George Birge, Danielle Bradbery, Kolby Cooper, Easton Corbin, Shane Profitt, Thompson Square

2024

Grandstand:
- Breaking Benjamin with New Medicine
- Kane Brown with Dylan Schneider
- Halestorm and I Prevail with Hollywood Undead and Fit for a King
- Ludacris with DJ Infamous
- Ted Nugent
- Jon Pardi with Drew Parker
- Lainey Wilson with Colby Acuff
Radio Stage:

Drew Baldridge, George Birge, Dillon Carmichael, Ashley Cooke, Runaway June, LoCash, Dylan Marlowe, John Morgan, Restless Road, Josh Ross, Conner Smith, Tigirlily Gold, Anne Wilson

2025

Grandstand:
- Alabama
- Beartooth, I Prevail, Killswitch Engage, and Parkway Drive, with Alpha Wolf, The Amity Affliction, Dark Divine, and The Devil Wears Prada
- The Coasters, The Drifters, and The Platters
- Foreigner
- Good Charlotte
- Riley Green
- Needtobreathe with Chris Renzema
- Rascal Flatts
- T-Pain
- Vanilla Ice, with All 4 One, Rob Base, Color Me Badd, and C+C Music Factory
Radio Stage:

Avery Anna, MacKenzie Carpenter, Craig Campbell, Kelsey Hart, Corey Kent, Chris Lane, Bryce Leatherwood, Lanco, Runaway June, Tigirlily Gold

2026

Grandstand:
- Brantley Gilbert with Ashley Cooke
- Stella Lefty
- Parmalee
- The Band Perry
- Michael Ray
Radio Stage:

Ingrid Andress, Rodney Atkins, Shane Profitt
