= Selena Gomez & the Scene =

American pop rock band

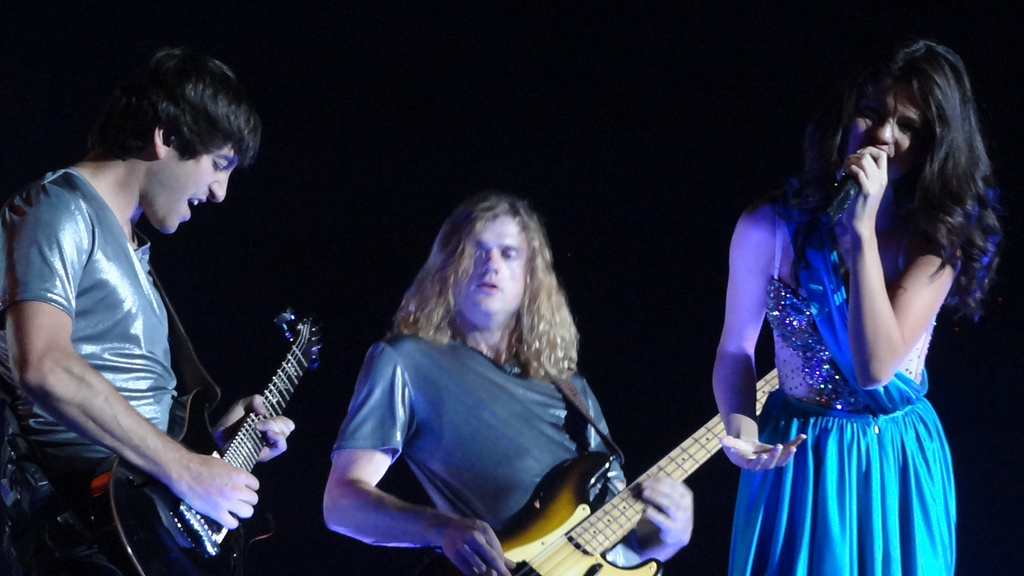
- Selena Gomez & the Scene performing on the We Own the Night Tour in September 2011. From left to right: Ethan Roberts, Joey Clement, and Selena Gomez

Background information
- Origin: Los Angeles, California, U.S.
- Genres: Pop rock; electropop; dance-pop
- Works: Discography
- Years active: 2008–2012
- Label: Hollywood
- Past members: Selena Gomez; Greg Garman; Joey Clement; Dane Forrest; Drew Taubenfeld; Ethan Roberts; Nick Foxer
- Website: selenagomez.com

Selena Gomez & the Scene was an American pop rock band formed in Los Angeles, California, in 2008. Its last lineup consisted of vocalist Selena Gomez, drummer Greg Garman, bassist Joey Clement, keyboardist Dane Forrest, and guitarist Drew Taubenfeld. The band released three studio albums, seven singles, and nine music videos.

Their debut album, Kiss & Tell, was released on September 29, 2009, debuting at No. 9 on the US Billboard 200 and earning the band a Gold certification from the Recording Industry Association of America (RIAA) in March 2010. The second single from the album, "Naturally", reached the top thirty in the U.S., as well as the top twenty in New Zealand, the United Kingdom, Ireland, Canada, and Germany. The song has been certified Platinum in the U.S. and Canada. As of 2012, Kiss & Tell has sold over 900,000 copies in the U.S.

The band's second album, A Year Without Rain, was released on September 17, 2010, debuting at No. 4 on the U.S. Billboard 200 and earning the band a second RIAA Gold certification in January 2011. Two singles were released from the album, "Round & Round" and the title track. As of 2012, the album has sold over 800,000 copies in the U.S.

The band's third album, When the Sun Goes Down, was released on June 28, 2011, debuting at No. 4 on the U.S. Billboard 200. Its lead single "Who Says" received its radio premiere on On Air with Ryan Seacrest on March 8, 2011, followed by a music video premiere on Disney Channel on March 11. The song has been certified Platinum in the U.S. The second single from the album, "Love You like a Love Song", was released on June 17, 2011, and was certified 4× Platinum in the U.S. The third and final single from the album was "Hit the Lights". The band disbanded when Gomez began focusing on acting and a solo music career.

The band has won numerous awards and accolades since their debut. They have won a total of four Poptastic Awards, including the Best Duo or Group Award. The band has also been nominated for five awards at the MuchMusic Video Awards, and two MTV Europe Music Awards. In 2011, the band won its first People's Choice Award for Breakout Group. In 2012, "Love You Like a Love Song" was nominated for an MTV Video Music Award, giving the band their first VMA nomination. The band has also won a total of six Teen Choice Awards since 2010, including Choice Music: Group and Choice Music: Love Song for "Love You like a Love Song".

== History ==
=== 2008–2009: Formation ===
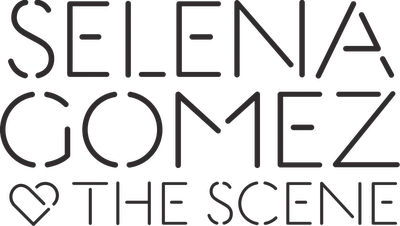
The band's logo used for their debut album, Kiss & Tell

Gomez first announced plans of forming a band in 2008, citing Paramore as an inspiration for the decision. In an interview with Jocelyn Vena of MTV News, Gomez said: "I'm going to be in a band. I'm not going to be a solo artist ... I don't want my name attached to it. I will be singing..." Gomez later announced on Twitter that her band would be called The Scene, an "ironic jab" at people who called Gomez a "wannabe scene". Gomez stated that her label, Hollywood Records, did not want her to have a band due to Gomez already having a "fan base", leading her to name the band Selena Gomez & the Scene to keep both herself and the label happy. In an interview with Z100 New York, Gomez stated that the band was formed through a long and exhausting audition process, saying that although she would preferably like "all guys" in the band, she was mainly looking for someone who's "very passionate about music and can show me that they can rock out. I like having people with me to lean on and write with and have fun with."

The band's original line-up featured Gomez on vocals, Ethan Roberts on lead guitar and backing vocals, Greg Garman on drums, Joey Clement on bass guitar, and Nick Foxer on keyboard and backing vocals. Gomez posted a video of the audition and interview process for band members as the fourth episode of a vlog series on her official YouTube channel titled Under Pressure. Shortly after the band was formed, Foxer left for unknown reasons, and was replaced by Dane Forrest. During a live performance for UNICEF in 2012, Gomez confirmed that Ethan Roberts would be leaving the group to pursue solo projects, with Gomez wishing him luck. He was replaced with Drew Taubenfeld that same year; unlike Roberts, Taubenfeld does not sing backing vocals. The group has also featured various back-up singers during tours, including YouTube star Christina Grimmie, who toured with Gomez & the Scene in 2010.

=== 2009–2010: Kiss & Tell and A Year Without Rain ===
The band's debut studio album, Kiss & Tell, was released on September 29, 2009. It includes collaborations with writers and producers such as Gina Schock of the Go-Go's and Rock Mafia. Predominantly a pop rock album, Kiss & Tell also incorporates a combination of other styles, including dance music. Being compared to releases by fellow Disney stars Miley Cyrus and Demi Lovato, the album was met with mixed reception, with some critics praising the album for its "fun" nature, and others criticizing Gomez's vocal performance. Kiss & Tell debuted at number 9 on the Billboard 200 in the US. It was later certified Gold in the country for sales exceeding 500,000 copies. It was successful in other territories as well, entering the Top 10 in Greece and Poland, as well as entering the Top 20 in the United Kingdom. To promote the album, Gomez & the Scene made numerous televised performances on shows such as season nine of Dancing with the Stars, The Ellen DeGeneres Show, Late Night with Jimmy Fallon, and Dick Clark's New Year's Rockin' Eve with Ryan Seacrest among other shows. The band also promoted the album with the concert tour, Selena Gomez & the Scene: Live in Concert. The band also contributed to Disney's All Wrapped Up Vol. 2. The EP includes the band's cover of "Winter Wonderland" as well as Christmas covers by other successful artists.

The band's lead single, "Falling Down" had minor commercial success, peaking at number 82 on the Billboard Hot 100, The music video premiered after the world premiere of Gomez' TV-movie Wizards of Waverly Place: The Movie on August 28, 2009. The single was described as being "pop-rock" by Bill Lamb of About.com, while Digital Spy compared it to music released by American singer Pink. Their single "Falling Down" was featured on Radio Disney Jams, Vol. 12, along with songs by other popular artists. Jams 12 was officially released on March 30, 2010. The second single from the album, "Naturally" was released on December 11, 2009, along with a music video for digital download. The music video was shot on November 14, 2009, and premiered on Disney Channel following the premiere of Phineas and Ferb Christmas Vacation on December 11, 2009. The single peaked at number 29 on the Billboard Hot 100 and at number 18 on the Canadian Hot 100. It was also their first number 1 hit on the Billboard Hot Dance Club Songs chart. On July 15, 2010, the single was certified Platinum by the RIAA.

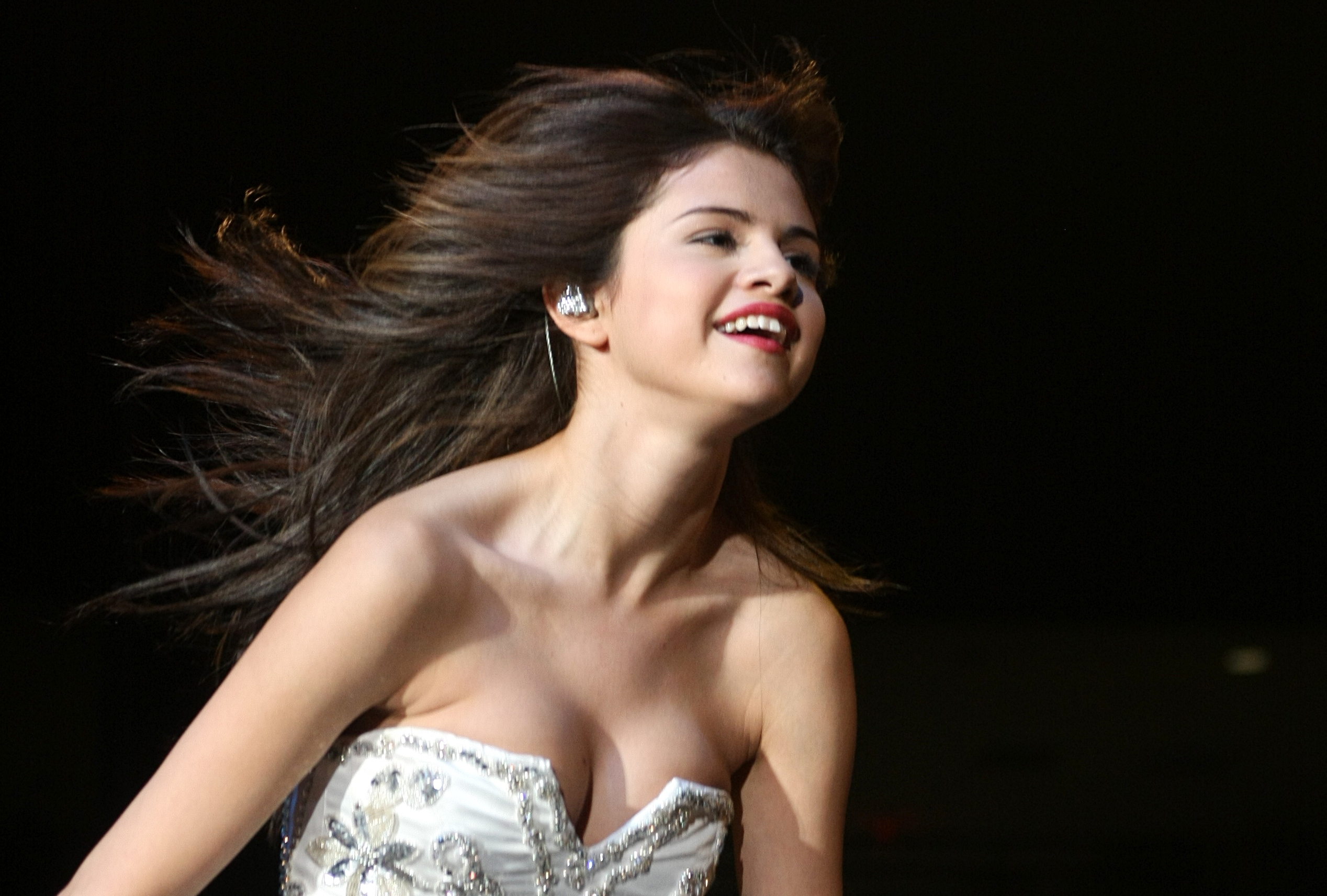
Selena Gomez & the Scene performing live at KISS 108 Jingle Ball December 2010

Work on the band's second studio album began in 2010. A Year Without Rain, was released on September 17, 2010. The album continues the dance-pop/electropop style of the group's hit single "Naturally". "I think we wanted to do something a little fun. We wanted to do a techno vibe," said Gomez. It debuted on the US Billboard 200 at number 4 with sales of a little over 66,000. A Year Without Rain was certified Gold by the RIAA for sales exceeding 500,000 copies in the US. The album received a mixed to positive reviews where some noticed that Gomez's vocals contain the Auto-Tune effect. The record's two singles achieved moderate success. The lead single, "Round & Round", premiered on June 18, 2010. The accompanying music video, which was filmed in Budapest, premiered two days later. It has been certified Gold in the United States. It debuted at number 24 on the Billboard Hot 100, and 76 on the Canadian Hot 100. It also debuted at number 15 on the Billboard Hot Digital Songs chart and at number 47 in the UK. The album's second single and title track "A Year Without Rain" was released on September 7, 2010. The music video premiered on September 3, after the world premiere of Camp Rock 2: The Final Jam. The Spanish version of the song, titled "Un Año Sin Lluvia", was released three months after the English version. On July 13, one of the album's tracks "Live Like There's No Tomorrow" was released as a single from the movie Ramona and Beezus, starring Gomez. The song failed to chart on any major charts worldwide. As of 2012, the album has sold an estimated 609,000 copies in the United States.

The album and subsequent singles were promoted mainly through televised performances and concert tours, much like with their previous album. Gomez & the Scene performed "Round & Round" live on shows such as America's Got Talent, Blue Peter, Daybreak, and MTV's The Seven, while performing "A Year Without Rain" on Good Morning America, The Ellen DeGeneres Show, and Lopez Tonight among other shows. On October 27, 2010, the band played an acoustic set for charity (UNICEF). They were also part of the Jingle Ball tour during December. In 2011, the band performed "A Year Without Rain" and won Favorite Breakout Artist on the Peoples Choice Awards. The album was further promoted through the band's A Year Without Rain Tour, which was both critically and commercially successful. During a backstage interview, Gomez remarked that she was conceptualizing the tour as far as stage and production and promised an amazing show with an "epic" stage for 2011.

=== 2011–2012: When the Sun Goes Down, hiatus, and split ===
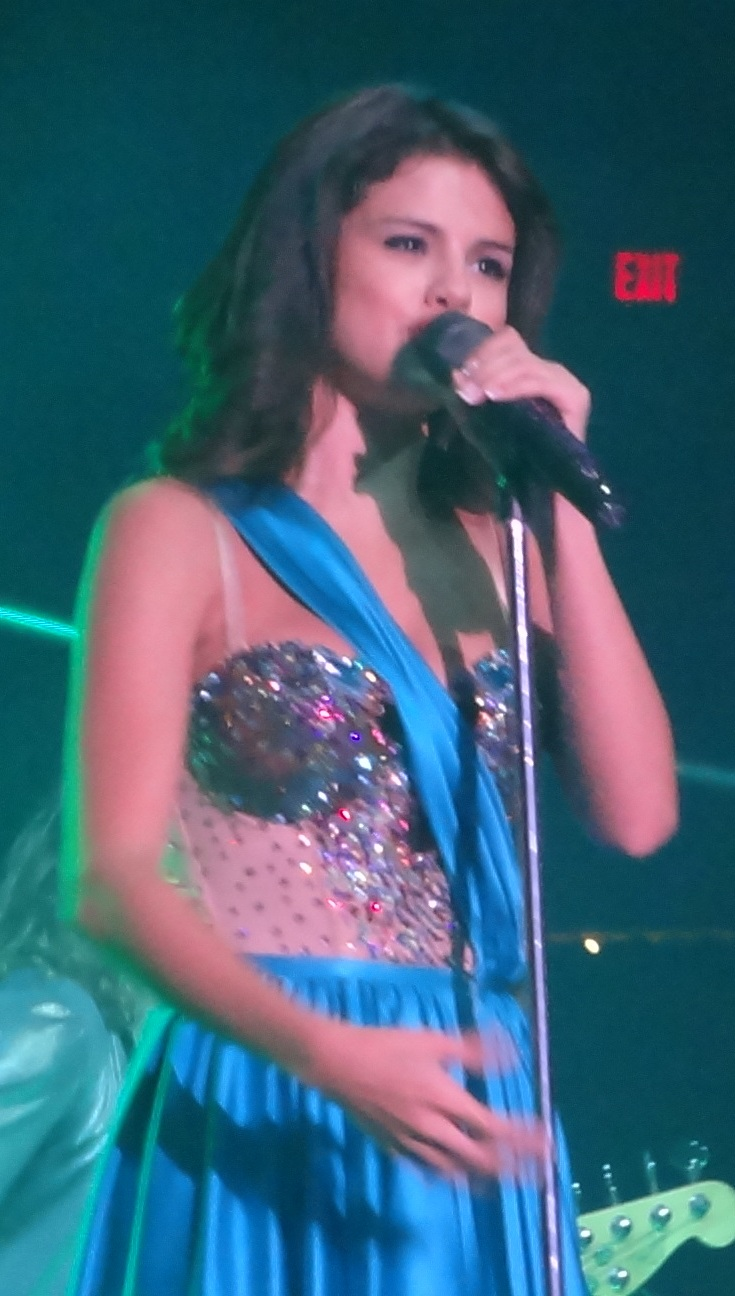
Selena Gomez in We Own the Night Tour in 2011

On February 15, 2011, Hollywood Records confirmed that a new album was in the works. The album was initially titled Otherside, but was later changed to When the Sun Goes Down. The album was released on June 28, 2011. The album expanded on the pop and dance elements found on the band's last album, and features a more electropop and synthpop sound. The album also explores organic instrumentation. The sound of the album was compared to recent releases by artists such as Kelly Clarkson among others. When the Sun Goes Down featured writing credits from writers and producers such as pop icon Britney Spears, pop singer Katy Perry, and Rock Mafia, among others. The album received a mixed reviews with the album's second single receiving a 4× Platinum certification from the RIAA. The record debuted at number 4 on the Billboard 200 with sales of 78,000 copies in its first week of release. This marked the highest first week sales for the band to date, outselling their first two albums by nearly 12,000 copies. As of 2012, When the Sun Goes Down has sold an estimated 642,000 copies in the US alone.

The album's lead single "Who Says" had its world premiere on On Air with Ryan Seacrest on March 8. The accompanying music video, which was directed by Chris Applebaum, premiered on VEVO on March 11. "Who Says" was a critical success but was only successful in the US, receiving a moderate success worldwide, becoming the band's highest-peaking song on the Hot 100 chart to date, where it peaked at number 21. The song was certified Platinum by the RIAA. The second single from the album was "Love You like a Love Song". The song was serviced to contemporary hit radio airplay on August 16, 2011, in the United States. The single peaked at number 22 on the Hot 100 chart. It became their highest-charting single on the Pop Songs chart based on radio airplay, where it peaked at No. 6. The single was later certified 4× Platinum in the U.S. "Hit the Lights" was released as the third and final single in 2012, but it failed to have much success. On March 23, 2011, Hollywood Records announced the We Own the Night Tour, which began on July 24, 2011 and ended on February 11, 2012.

On January 7, 2012, Gomez announced that the band was on hiatus and that they would not release a new album in 2012. On July 22, 2012, Selena Gomez & the Scene won "Choice Music: Group" for the third time in a row at the 2012 Teen Choice Awards. By 2017, Gomez had confirmed the hiatus was a permanent split for her to focus on acting and solo music career.

== Members ==
Final line-up

- Selena Gomez – vocals (2008–2012)
- Greg Garman – drums (2008–2012)
- Joey Clement – bass (2008–2012)
- Dane Forrest – keyboards (2008–2012)
- Drew Taubenfeld – guitars (2012)

Former members

- Ethan Roberts – guitars, backing vocals (2008–2012)
- Nick Foxer – keyboards, backing vocals (2008–2009)

Touring members

- Lindsey Harper – backing vocals (2010–2012)
- Katelyn Clampett – backing vocals (2011–2012)
- Ashleigh Haney – backing vocals (2011)
- Christina Grimmie – backing vocals (2010–2011) (died 2016)

== Discography ==
- Kiss & Tell (2009)
- A Year Without Rain (2010)
- When the Sun Goes Down (2011)

== Tours ==
- Live in Concert (2009–2010)
- A Year Without Rain Tour (2010–2011)
- We Own the Night Tour (2011–2012)

== Awards and nominations ==
Year	Association	Category	Work	Result
2010	Teen Choice Awards	Choice Music: Group	Selena Gomez & the Scene	Won
2010	Teen Choice Awards	Choice Music: Breakout Artist	Selena Gomez & the Scene	Won
2010	MTV Europe Music Awards	Best Push Act	Selena Gomez & the Scene	Nominated
2011	Kids' Choice Awards Argentina	Favorite International Singer	Selena Gomez	Won
2011	People's Choice Awards	Favorite Breakout Artist	Selena Gomez & the Scene	Won
2011	MuchMusic Video Awards	International Video of the Year – Artist	"A Year Without Rain"	Nominated
2011	MuchMusic Video Awards	Ur Fave International Video	"A Year Without Rain"	Nominated
2011	MuchMusic Video Awards	MuchMusic.com Most Watched Video of the Year	"A Year Without Rain"	Nominated
2011	Teen Choice Awards	Choice Music: Group	Selena Gomez & the Scene	Won
2011	Teen Choice Awards	Choice Music: Single	"Who Says"	Won
2011	Teen Choice Awards	Choice Music: Love Song	"Love You like a Love Song"	Won
2012	MuchMusic Video Awards	International Video of the Year – Group	"Love You like a Love Song"	Nominated
2012	Teen Choice Awards	Choice Music: Group	Selena Gomez & the Scene	Won
2012	Teen Choice Awards	Choice Music: Single by a Group	"Hit the Lights"	Nominated
2012	Kids' Choice Awards Mexico	Canción Favorita	"Love You like a Love Song"	Nominated
2012	MTV Video Music Awards	Best Female Video	"Love You like a Love Song"	Nominated
2012	Vevo Certified Awards	Vevo Certified 100 Million Views	"Naturally"	Won
2012	Vevo Certified Awards	Vevo Certified 100 Million Views	"A Year Without Rain"	Won
2012	Vevo Certified Awards	Vevo Certified 100 Million Views	"Who Says"	Won
2012	Vevo Certified Awards	Vevo Certified 100 Million Views	"Love You like a Love Song"	Won

== See also ==
- List of artists who reached number one on the U.S. dance chart
- List of artists who reached number one on the U.S. dance airplay chart
