= Falling Down (Selena Gomez & the Scene song) =

Single by Selena Gomez & the Scene

from the album Kiss & Tell
- Released: August 25, 2009
- Studio: The Flood Room, Rondor Studios; The Village (Los Angeles, California)
- Genre: Rock; pop punk
- Length: 3:05
- Label: Hollywood
- Songwriters: Ted Bruner; Trey Vittetoe; Gina Schock
- Producers: Ted Bruner; Trey Vittetoe

Selena Gomez & the Scene singles chronology
"Falling Down" (2009)	"Naturally" (2009)

Music video
- "Falling Down" on YouTube

"Falling Down" is a song recorded by American pop rock band Selena Gomez & the Scene for their debut studio album, Kiss & Tell (2009). It was released on August 25, 2009 through Hollywood Records as the lead single from the album. The song was written by Ted Bruner and Trey Vittetoe, both of whom produced the track; Gina Schock of The Go-Go's also receives writing credit. Musically, "Falling Down" is an uptempo rock track that contains heavy usage of synths. Its lyrics see Gomez ridiculing life in Hollywood and fame, though can also be interpreted to speak of a romantic relationship. The song was released in select territories, receiving no official release in European territories.

Upon its release, "Falling Down" received widespread critical acclaim from critics, receiving praise for being "catchy" and for Gomez's "sassy" vocal delivery. The song became the band's first chart entry on the Billboard Hot 100 chart, where it peaked at number 82. It became a top twenty hit in Japan, becoming the group's highest charting effort to date in the country. "Falling Down" went on to sell over 500,000 copies in the United States alone. The accompanying music video premiered on August 28, 2009 through Disney Channel. The video featured Gomez and her band performing the song on a round black stage, and features various shots of Gomez in a photo shoot and singing the song without the band.

"Falling Down" was promoted through a number of live performances, including the ninth season of Dancing with the Stars. The performance received a mixed reaction, with Gomez receiving criticism for her vocal ability.

== Background ==
Following a string of soundtrack appearances and original recordings for the Disney Channel, Selena Gomez signed a five album contract with Hollywood Records on her sixteenth birthday. Inspired by acts such as Paramore and Forever the Sickest Kids, Gomez opted to form a band rather than release music as a solo artist. Work on the album began in 2008, with Gomez reportedly considering up to one-hundred songs for the album. Having previously worked with Hollywood Records artist Miley Cyrus, Ted Bruner, Gina Schock and Trey Vittetoe were enlisted to work on the project. Gina Schock, who rose to fame as a member of The Go-Go's, served as an inspiration for Gomez, and worked on numerous songs for the record. Bruner and Schock, alongside Trey Vittetoe, co-wrote "Falling Down" for Gomez and her band. Bruner and Vittetoe produced the song together. Gomez personally confirmed on August 13 via her official Twitter account that the lyrics to "Falling Down" would premiere through Radio Disney on August 21, 2009. The single was released for digital download in the United States and Canada on August 25, 2009. It received a digital release in Australia on September 25, 2009. The song received no official release in European territories.

== Composition and critical reception ==
"Falling Down"
"Falling Down" makes heavy usage of guitars and drums, accompanied by synths.

"Falling Down" is a rock song that features "aggressive" guitar and drum lines powered by "bloopy" synths. Bill Lamb of About.com noted that the song seemed to be influenced by Avril Lavigne. Robert Copsey of Digital Spy said the song sounded "suspiciously similar to Pink's 'U + Ur Hand'." The song is set in common time, and has a tempo of 140 beats per minute. It is written in the key of D aerycryllian mode, and Gomez's vocals span from the low note of A_{3} to high note of D_{5}. It follows the chord progression Dm–C–Dm-C. Bill Lamb of About.com gave the single 4 out of 5 stars, calling the song "catchy" and commending Gomez's "sassy" vocals and its lyrics. Lamb also noted that "The mix leaves in Gomez' [sic] occasional breathless delivery that only conveys more immediacy for the song." A CBBC reviewer complimented the song's "catchy lyrics", stating "you will have them in your head for days!" Rob Perez of NocheLatina called the track one of the best on the album. Robert Copsey of Digital Spy said the song and its lyrics sounded "uninspired."

Lyrically, "Falling Down" is said to be in regards to accusations of wrongdoing and has a sense of longing for a non-benefiting relationship. However in an interview, Gomez stated, during an interview that the song ultimately is a ridicule of the Hollywood life and fame, that was the meaning behind "Smile for the camera, 'cause they're all about to trash ya." Gomez further elaborated on the concept of the song on an interview with Just Jared Jr., saying,

It's basically about Hollywood and what people think about it and essentially how plastic it is sometimes. It's fun and I think girls can relate to it somewhat, for me it was because of Hollywood but it can really relate to a mean girl, an ex-boyfriend, to whoever.

== Chart performance ==
The song debuted on the September 12, 2009 edition of the US Billboard Hot 100 at number 93. It later peaked at number 82. It became the band's first charting single in the United States. In the same week, "Falling Down" also appeared on the Canadian Hot 100, debuting at number 69. It spent two weeks on the chart, falling to number 82 in its second week. It re-entered the Billboard Hot 100 at number 92 for the week ending January 9, 2010. The song managed to peak at number 11 on the Australian Hitseekers Singles Chart. On the Japan Hot 100, "Falling Down" debuted at number 24 on the week dated March 6, 2010. The following week, it peaked at number 15 on the chart. As of July 2015, the song has sold 576,000 copies in the United States.

== Music video ==
Selena Gomez & the Scene on a black circular stage in the "Falling Down" music video.

The music video to "Falling Down", directed by Chris Dooley, was first seen on Disney Channel, succeeding Wizards of Waverly Place: The Movie on August 28, 2009. It became available for purchase on the iTunes Store the next day.

The music video commences with shots of Gomez singing the first lines, "whoa, whoa", and bright lights shining upon her; she is wearing a gray shirt, black tights and boots and has long brown hair. Then, the rest of the band, composed of four male members, is seen as Gomez dances and nods her head. The background in the music video is a large projection of patterned geometrical figures that constantly alter to divergent colors. Gomez is then seen in a "photo shoot-like" set wearing a white shirt and a zebra-patterned skirt. As the video progresses Gomez and the rest of the band are seen singing, dancing, playing instruments and using props. Gomez holds a mirror and fake flowers, which she then throws away, in conjunction to the song's lines. The video ends with Gomez taking a quick bow while still holding her microphone.

== Live performances ==
Gomez & the Scene first performed the song live on the ninth season of Dancing with the Stars. During the performance, professional dancers Derek Hough and Karina Smirnoff danced to the song. Tamara Brooks of Zap2it commented "The song's catchy but Selena doesn't look entirely comfortable on stage to me. It's very...rehearsed. But the dancing was faboo." Additionally, they performed the song at numerous concerts in 2009 and 2010, including their House of Blues Tour, the Kiss & Tell Tour and their Fairs & Festivals tour.

== Track listing ==
- Digital download
1. "Falling Down" — 3:05

== Credits and personnel ==
Recording and Management

- Recorded at The Flood Room, Rondor Studios and The Village (Los Angeles, California)
- Mastered at Capitol Mastering (Los Angeles, California)
- Silly Fish Music/Almo Music (ASCAP), Extremely Corrosive Music (BMI), Schock It To Me Music (ASCAP) administered worldwide by PEN Music Group, Inc.

Personnel

- Selena Gomez – lead vocals
- Ted Bruner – songwriter, producer, engineering
- Trey Vittetoe – songwriter, producer, engineering, all instruments
- Gina Schock – songwriter
- Clif Norrell – mixing
- Josh Freese – drums
- Ghian Wright – drum programming
- Robert Vosgien – mastering

Credits and personnel adapted from Kiss & Tell album liner notes.

== Charts ==
Chart (2009–10)	Peak position
Canada (Canadian Hot 100)	69
Japan (Japan Hot 100)	15
US Billboard Hot 100	82

== Certifications ==
Region	Certification	Certified units/sales
United States (RIAA)	Gold	500,000^{‡}
^{‡} Sales+streaming figures based on certification alone.

== Release history ==
Region	Date	Format
Canada	August 25, 2009	Digital download
United States	August 25, 2009	Digital download
Australia	September 25, 2009	Digital download
