= A Year Without Rain (song) =

Single by Selena Gomez & the Scene

from the album A Year Without Rain
- Released: September 7, 2010
- Recorded: July 2010
- Studio: Strawberrybee Studios (Los Angeles, CA)
- Genre: Eurodance; synth-pop
- Length: 3:54
- Label: Hollywood
- Songwriters: Lindy Robbins; Toby Gad
- Producer: Toby Gad

Selena Gomez & the Scene singles chronology
"Round & Round" (2010)	"A Year Without Rain" (2010)	"Who Says" (2011)

Music video
- "A Year Without Rain" on YouTube "Un Año Sin Lluvia" on YouTube

"A Year Without Rain" is a song by American band Selena Gomez & the Scene. It was written by Lindy Robbins and Toby Gad, with the latter also producing the song. The song was released on September 7, 2010, as the second and final single from the band's second album of the same name. A Spanish-language version of the song was also recorded, entitled "Un año sin lluvia" [un ˈaɲo siɲ ˈʎuβja]. Gomez titled the album for the song because she wanted to base all the other songs around it. Musically, the song is a Eurodance track backed with a disco beat. In its lyrics, the song's protagonist compares yearning for her love to a year without rain.

Music critics gave the song positive reviews, complimenting it as a dance ballad and noting Gomez's vocal maturity. "A Year Without Rain" became the band's third consecutive top forty single in the United States and Canada. It also charted in the lower regions of some European countries. The song is certified Double Platinum in the US. The song's accompanying music video, directed by Chris Dooley and shot on-site in Lucerne Valley, California features Gomez frolicking in the desert surrounded by a swarm of photographs of her and her love interest, before they meet during a rainstorm. The band performed the song a number of times via live performances, including on televised programs such as Good Morning America, The Ellen Show, and the 2011 People's Choice Awards.

== Background and composition ==
"A Year Without Rain"
A sample of "A Year Without Rain", a Eurodance track which utilizes a disco backing.

In early 2010, a demo of the song, performed by singer RaVaughn leaked online. Becky Bain of Idolator called the song a "mature dance track" and said that it "wouldn’t entirely be out of place on a Sophie Ellis-Bextor album." In an interview with MTV News, Gomez said that "A Year Without Rain" was the first song she recorded for the album. She also explained why she named the album for the song, commenting, "I feel like that song has a lot of meaning, and it also kind of was the start of what I wanted to base all the other songs around." A Spanish-language version of the song titled "Un Año Sin Lluvia" was released through the iTunes Store on October 26, 2010.

"A Year Without Rain" was written by Lindy Robbins and Toby Gad, the later also producing it, with a length of three minutes and twenty-nine seconds. Musically, it has been described as a dance track, more specifically as Eurodance. It has also been called a synth-pop and electro track which uses a standard pop structure and is backed with a disco beat. According to sheet music published at Musicnotes.com by EMI Music Publishing, "A Year Without Rain" is set in common time and has a tempo of 120 beats per minute. It is written in the key of C Mixolydian and follows the chord progression of C–Gm–Dm–F throughout most of the song, but the bridge is written in D minor, following a chord progression of Bb-C-Am-Dm. It's important to mention that C Mixolydian and D minor share the same key signature, so the musical notes of both modes are the same, but the tonic note is different. Gomez's vocals in the song span from F_{3} to E_{5}. Lyrically, the song sees Gomez longing for the object of her affection and compares it to a year without rain: "I need you by my side/ Don't know how I'll survive/A day without you is like a year without rain." According to Megan Vick of Billboard, the sound of the song contrasts with its "tender" lyrics.

== Reception ==
=== Critical reception ===
Although he called it one of the album's "pensive moments", Bill Lamb of About.com noted the track as one of the top songs on the album, calling it a "beautiful dance ballad." Lamb also said the song shows "Selena Gomez is clearly growing up as an artist." Stating that it showed her "maturation as an artist", Lamb later ranked the song number thirty-nine on the site's list of "Top 100 Pop Songs of 2010". AllMusic's Tim Sendra also named the song a standout on the album, calling it "catchy" and "well-sung". Megan Vick of Billboard said that while Gomez did not have the vocal power of Demi Lovato, she "makes a strong effort to attack the high notes as she croons the chorus". Vick stated that the song "is compelling enough to separate the singer from other Disney-groomed pop stars." Wairarapa Times-Age writer Kim Gillespie named "A Year Without Rain" one of the album's highlights. David Welsh of musicOMH noted Gomez' mature performance and wrote that the song "reaps rewards with an impressively heartbroken stab at euro-dance". In contrast, The Washington Post critic Allison Stewart was unfavorable of the lyrical content of the song, commenting that it was "the sort of exercise in teenage co-dependence...that should be long extinct."

=== Chart performance ===
Propelled by its debut at number fourteen on the Hot Digital Songs chart, "A Year Without Rain" debuted at number thirty-five on the Billboard Hot 100, becoming the group's third consecutive top forty single. It remained on the chart for four weeks. On the week dated January 1, 2011, the song debuted at number thirty-six on the US Hot Dance Club Play chart. As of August 2014, the song has sold 1,002,000 downloads in the US.

The song achieved greater success in Canada, peaking at thirty on the Canadian Hot 100. The song also appeared on numerous European charts, peaking at seventy-eight in the United Kingdom, fifty-six in Germany, and forty-one in Slovakia. It also reached number three on the Belgian Flanders Tip chart.

== Music video ==
The music video, directed by Chris Dooley, was shot on location in Lucerne Valley, California. It premiered on September 3, 2010, on Disney Channel, following the premiere of Camp Rock 2: The Final Jam and a sneak peek of Fish Hooks, while it premiered a few days earlier on Gomez's YouTube channel, on August 31, 2010. The video starts off with the band driving through the desert in a red convertible. Gomez removes a photograph from the sun visor, which is subsequently blown away by the wind. The chorus commences as the band disappears and Gomez steps out of the vehicle, wearing a dress and begins to sing. As the video progresses, a multitude of photographs of her relationship fall from the sky, as Gomez travels elegantly through the desert. During the bridge, it starts to rain as Gomez spots her love interest (Niko Pepaj) in the distance. The two begin to walk towards each other, and the video ends as they meet and hold hands.

Nadine Cheung of AOL JSYK said "She sings: 'I'm missing you so much / Can't help it, I'm in love / A day without you is like a year without rain' and that's really what's depicted in a simple and sweet way."

A Spanish version ("Un Año Sin Lluvia") of the video was released on November 19, 2010, on Vevo.

== Live performances ==
The band first performed the song on September 22, 2010, on The Ellen DeGeneres Show. The band performed the song on Good Morning America on September 23, 2010. On November 16, 2010, the band performed the song on Lopez Tonight, and they performed it on Live with Regis and Kelly on December 1, 2010. They performed the song at the 2011 People's Choice Awards on January 5, 2011, and afterwards were awarded the Choice award for Favorite Breakout Artist. Gomez appeared on stage accompanied by low lights and fog. Kara Warner of MTV News commented, "Although it wasn't a stadium-rocking performance à la Lady Gaga or Katy Perry, Gomez powered through her pop song with a sense of earnestness and commitment. She didn't even miss a beat when her earpiece appeared to fall out mid-song." The song was also performed during the "We Own the Night Tour".

== Formats and track listings ==
- Germany CD single
1. "A Year Without Rain" – 3:54
2. "A Year Without Rain" (Starlab Radio Edit) – 3:41
- Digital download
1. "A Year Without Rain" – 3:54

== Credits and personnel ==
Credits and personnel adapted from A Year Without Rain album liner notes.

- Selena Gomez – lead vocals
- Lindy Robbins – songwriting
- Robert Vosgien – mastering
- Toby Gad – songwriting, production, mixing, arrangement, recording & instruments

== Awards and nominations ==
Year	Award	Category	Work	Result
2011	MuchMusic Video Awards	"International Video of the Year"	"A Year Without Rain"	Nominated
2011	MuchMusic Video Awards	"UR FAVE International Artist"	"A Year Without Rain"	Nominated

== Charts ==
=== Weekly charts ===
Chart (2010–11)	Peak position
Australia (ARIA)	78
Belgium (Ultratip Bubbling Under Flanders)	3
Canada Hot 100 (Billboard)	30
Germany (GfK)	56
Czech Republic Airplay (ČNS IFPI)	41
Slovakia Airplay (ČNS IFPI)	41
UK Singles (Official Charts)	78
US Billboard Hot 100	35
US Dance Club Songs (Billboard)	1

=== Year-end charts ===
Chart (2011)	Position
US Hot Dance Club Songs (Billboard)	35
Taiwan (Hit FM Top 100 Singles of the Year)	82

== Certifications ==
Region	Certification	Certified units/sales
Australia (ARIA)	Gold	35,000^{^}
Brazil (Pro-Música Brasil)	Platinum	60,000^{‡}
New Zealand (RMNZ)	Gold	7,500^{*}
United States (RIAA)	2× Platinum	2,000,000^{‡}
^{*} Sales figures based on certification alone.^{^} Shipments figures based on certification alone.^{‡} Sales+streaming figures based on certification alone.

== Release history ==
Region	Date	Format
Canada	September 7, 2010	Digital download
United States	September 7, 2010	Digital download
Australia	September 17, 2010	Digital download
Belgium	September 17, 2010	Digital download
Denmark	September 17, 2010	Digital download
Finland	September 17, 2010	Digital download
France	September 17, 2010	Digital download
New Zealand	September 17, 2010	Digital download
Portugal	September 17, 2010	Digital download
Spain	September 17, 2010	Digital download
Sweden	September 17, 2010	Digital download
Switzerland	September 17, 2010	Digital download
Germany	November 12, 2010	CD single
United Kingdom	November 22, 2010	CD single

== See also ==
- List of number-one dance singles of 2011 (U.S.)
