= Round & Round (Selena Gomez & the Scene song) =

Single by Selena Gomez & the Scene

from the album A Year Without Rain
- Released: June 22, 2010 (see radio and release history)
- Recorded: May 2010
- Studio: BAMF Studios (Los Angeles, CA); Soundtrack Studios (New York, NY); Soundmaster Studios, Ltd. (Budapest, Hungary)
- Genre: Electropop; pop rock
- Length: 3:06
- Label: Hollywood
- Songwriters: Kevin Rudolf; Andrew Bolooki; Fefe Dobson; Jeff Halavacs; Jacob Kasher Hindlin
- Producers: Rudolf; Bolooki; Halatrax

Selena Gomez & the Scene singles chronology
"Naturally" (2009)	"Round & Round" (2010)	"A Year Without Rain" (2010)

Music video
- "Round & Round" on YouTube

"Round & Round" is a song by American band Selena Gomez & the Scene. The song was written and produced by Kevin Rudolf, Andrew Bolooki, and Jeff Halavacs, and co-written by Jacob Kasher Hindlin and Fefe Dobson. It was released on June 22, 2010, as the lead single from the band's second album, A Year Without Rain (2010). "Round & Round" is a dance-driven electro-pop rock song with techno beats. The song received positive reviews, with critics taking note of the song's instant attraction beyond the expected demographic. It peaked at number twenty-four on the Billboard Hot 100, becoming the band's highest-charting single in the United States at the time. It charted moderately in several international markets, including Canada, Germany, and the United Kingdom. Gomez & the Scene performed the song multiple times.

== Composition ==
"Round & Round"
A sample of "Round & Round", a disco-influenced, dance-driven electro-pop rock song with a techno beat.

"Round & Round" is a dance-driven electro-pop rock song with a length of three minutes and five seconds, composed by Kevin Rudolf, Andrew Bolooki, and Jeff Halatrax, Jacob Kasher and Fefe Dobson. The song's disco influence was noted to be new for Gomez's usual "poppy" music. Mikael Wood of Billboard said the song "rides a fist-pumping electro groove". According to Amar Toor of AOL Radio Blog, the song pulls influence from Kylie Minogue circa 2001. The song's lyrics speak of a relationship going around in circles. The song's middle eight is a sing-speak breakdown, in which Gomez raps her lyrics in a Kesha-esque fashion.

== Reception ==
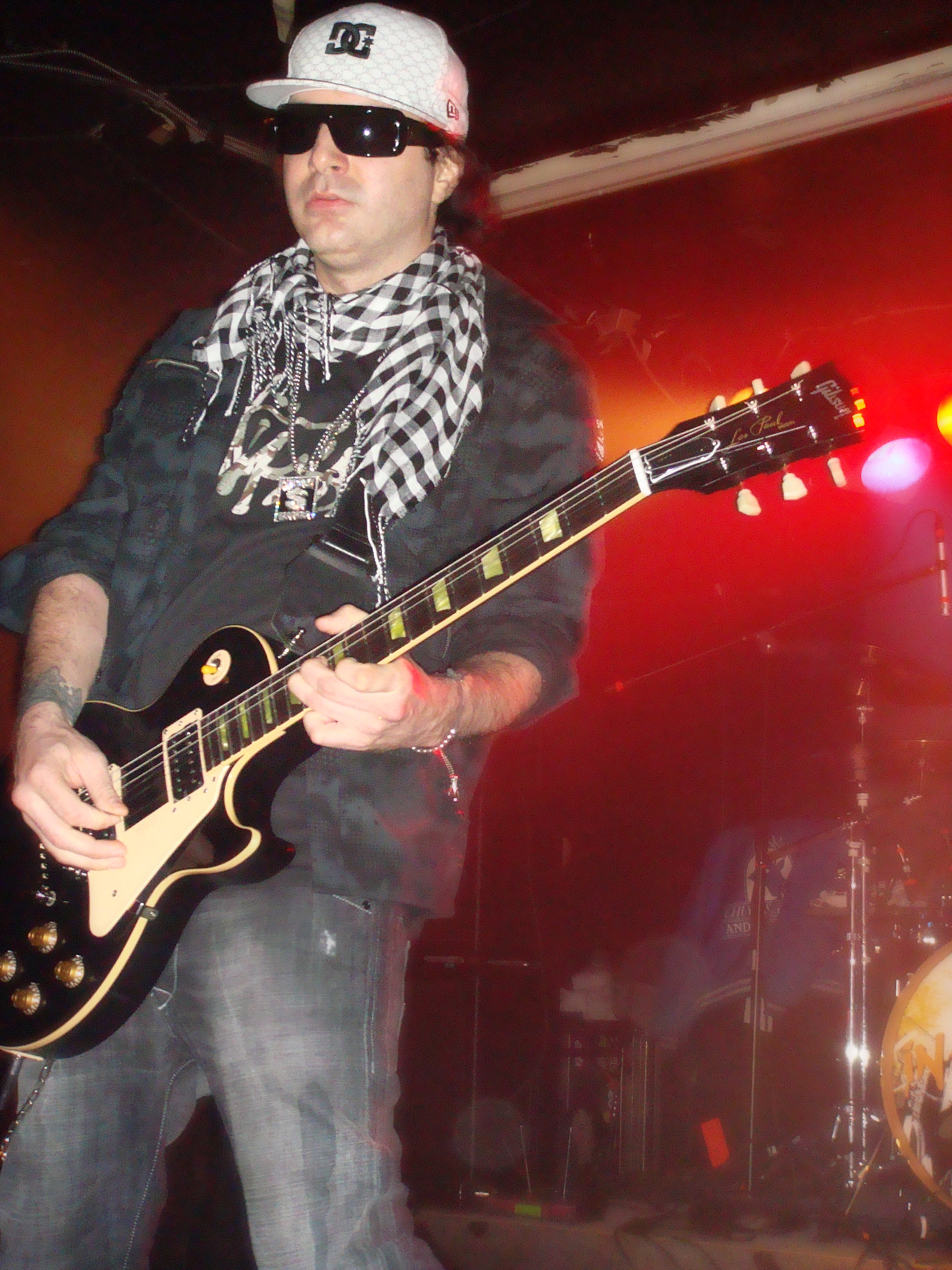
Kevin Rudolf produced the song.

=== Critical reception ===
Tim Sendra of Allmusic said that the song was "well sung" and noted it as one of the top tracks on the album. Becky Bain of Idolator said the song had an "infectious tune", and said "might actually be the song to get the non-Disney-centric demographic interested in Selena's tunes." Although commenting that the "glossy electro-pop rock" of the song showed a sophisticated side of Gomez, and the lyrics showed emotional growth, Robert Cospey of Digital Spy said the good work was squandered by the "rusty" chorus. Overall, Copsey complimented Gomez for "avoiding the predictable Hilary/Miley teen-rawk route" and recommended she stay under the Disney umbrella to "perfect her craft further".

=== Chart performance ===
Propelled by a debut at number fifteen on the US Hot Digital Songs chart, "Round & Round" debuted at number twenty-four on the Billboard Hot 100, becoming the band's second consecutive top thirty single in the United States. It also appeared on the Billboard charts the Hot Dance Club Play and Pop Songs charts at two and thirty-four. However, it did not match the peaks of its predecessor "Naturally" on those charts, where the latter peaked at one and twelve. The song performed moderately in international markets. It reached fifty-one on the Canadian Hot 100. In the United Kingdom, it reached forty-seven, and was on the chart for three consecutive weeks. "Round & Round" charted in the top sixty in Austria, and Germany, and appeared on the Belgian Flanders tip chart, as well as charting in Slovakia. As of July 2015, "Round & Round" has sold 958,000 copies in the United States.

== Music video ==
The filming of the video was made by Philip Andelman and took place in late May 2010 in Budapest, Hungary during the filming of her film, Monte Carlo. Gomez posted two previews of the song on her Twitter on June 17, 2010, to precede the video's premiere on June 20, 2010, on the Disney Channel and subsequently VEVO. Along with singing on a stage with the Scene, the video features Gomez acting as a secret agent and donning spy apparel, as she plants bugs, takes photos, passes off packages, and other duties. She is then caught by other spies and is chased throughout the city, with another secret agent she works with covers her back as she runs away. It ends with Gomez blowing out the match she previously struck. Nadine Cheung of AOL JSYK said, "We love the storyline for the video and how it's mixed in with performance shots of Selena and her band the Scene. Of course, the 17-year-old star is decked out in amazing outfits, no matter if she's rocking out on stage or being followed by cloaked agents."

== Live performances and promotion ==
The song was performed by the band on America's Got Talent on July 14, 2010. It was also performed on Good Morning America on September 23, 2010, along with "A Year Without Rain". While promoting in the United Kingdom, Gomez appeared on Daybreak on September 27, 2010, and on Blue Peter on the following day, September 28, 2010. Gomez performed the song on MTV's The Seven on October 1, 2010.

== Track listing ==
US digital download

1. "Round & Round" – 3:05

Round & Round (Dave Audé Remix) – Single

1. "Round & Round" (Dave Audé Remix) – 3:32

Australian / UK Remixes EP

1. "Round & Round" (Wideboys Club Mix) – 5:56
2. "Round & Round" (Fascination Club Mix) – 6:11
3. "Round & Round" (7th Heaven Club Mix) – 6:08
4. "Round & Round" (Dave Audé Club Remix) – 6:23

Australian digital single

1. "Round & Round" – 3:05
2. "Naturally" (Ralphi Rosario Remix) – 3:39

UK single

1. "Round & Round" – 3:05
2. "Naturally" (Ralphi Rosario Remix) – 3:39

== Credits and personnel ==
Credits and personnel adapted from A Year Without Rain album liner notes.

- Selena Gomez – lead vocals
- Kevin Rudolf – songwriting, production
- Andrew Bolooki – songwriting, production
- Jeff Halatrax – songwriting, production
- Fefe Dobson – songwriting
- Jacob Kasher Hindlin – songwriting
- Jon Lind – vocal production
- Brian Reeves – vocal production
- Serban Ghenea – mastering
- Robert Vosgien – mastering
- John Hanes – mix engineering
- Tim Roberts – mix engineering assistance

== Charts ==
Chart (2010)	Peak position
Australia (ARIA)	80
Austria (Ö3 Austria Top 40)	62
Belgium (Ultratip Bubbling Under Flanders)	19
Canada Hot 100 (Billboard)	51
Germany (GfK)	52
Ireland (IRMA)	44
Mexico (Mexico Airplay)	27
Slovakia Airplay (ČNS IFPI)	39
UK Singles (Official Charts)	47
US Billboard Hot 100	24
US Dance Club Songs (Billboard)	2
US Pop Airplay (Billboard)	34

== Certifications ==
Region	Certification	Certified units/sales
Canada (Music Canada)	Gold	40,000^{‡}
United States (RIAA)	Platinum	1,000,000^{‡}
^{‡} Sales+streaming figures based on certification alone.

== Radio and release history ==
Region	Date	Format
United States	June 22, 2010	Digital download
United States	June 29, 2010	Mainstream/Top 40 radio
Australia	September 3, 2010	Digital download, remixes
United States	September 14, 2010	Dave Audé Remix Radio Edit
United Kingdom	September 26, 2010	Remixes
Germany	September 24, 2010	CD single
United Kingdom	September 27, 2010	CD single, digital download
