= Naturally (Selena Gomez & the Scene song) =

2009 single by Selena Gomez & the Scene

- CD single artwork

Single by Selena Gomez & the Scene

from the album Kiss & Tell
- B-side: "Kiss & Tell"
- Released: December 11, 2009
- Studio: Cookie Jar Studios (Los Angeles, California)
- Genre: Dance-pop; electropop; hi-NRG
- Length: 3:22; 3:07 (radio edit)
- Label: Hollywood
- Songwriters: Antonina Armato; Tim James; Devrim Karaoglu
- Producers: Armato; James; Karaoglu (co-producer)

Selena Gomez & the Scene singles chronology
| "Falling Down" (2009) | "Naturally" (2009) | "Round & Round" (2010) |

Music video
- "Naturally" on YouTube

"Naturally" is a song performed by American band Selena Gomez & the Scene, taken from their debut studio album Kiss & Tell (2009). It was first released by Hollywood Records as the album's second single on December 11, 2009. The song was produced by Antonina Armato and Tim James who wrote the song with Devrim Karaoglu. Musically, "Naturally" is an uptempo dance-pop song which relies on electropop in the style of hi-NRG. The song's lyrics speak of a relationship in which feelings are not forced and the protagonist sings of their happiness. It also appears on the international edition of the band's second album, A Year Without Rain (2010).

"Naturally" received generally positive reviews, with critics complimenting its electro and club feel. The song reached the top ten in Belgium, Hungary, Ireland, Scotland, Slovakia, and the United Kingdom while peaking in the top twenty in Canada and Germany. It also received platinum certifications from Canada and the United States. The song's accompanying music video sees Gomez sporting several different outfits and styles before a backdrop. Gomez & the Scene performed the song numerous times including on Dick Clark's New Year's Rockin' Eve with Ryan Seacrest among other televised events and live performances. The song was ranked number eighty-four on About.com's list of "Top 100 Pop Songs of 2010".

== Composition ==
"Naturally" is a dance-pop and electropop song which derives from the style of Hi-NRG while incorporating disco beats. Gomez described the song as "light", "energetic", and "poppy". The song is set in common time, and has an electro-pop tempo of 132 beats per minute. It is written in the key of B ♭ minor, and Gomez's vocals span from the low note of F_{3} to high note of F_{5}. It follows the chord progression B♭m–G♭–A♭-B♭m in the verses and B♭m-G♭-D♭-A♭ in the chorus. According to Chris Ryan of MTV News the song is influenced by Kylie Minogue. According to CBBC, The song is lyrically about meeting someone who is comfortable in their own skin, as the protagonist singing how happy they are to be with them. The lyrics also state that everything in the relationship comes "Naturally". In an interview with Digital Spy, Gomez said that the song was about "two people who have a connection with each other so they don't really have to force the feelings - they're just there." Overall, she said the song was a great representation of the whole album.

== Critical reception ==
Bill Lamb of About.com ranked the song amongst the top tracks on Kiss & Tell. Mikael Wood of Billboard gave the song a positive review, stating that it "has a juicy and instantly memorable vocal hook". In a review of the album, Robert Copsey of Digital Spy coined the song "electro-thumping", commenting that it was "as innocent as the purity ring on Gomez's finger and showcases her polished vocals perfectly." Copsey also stated that the impressive hooks present in the song do not appear on the album anywhere else. In a single review, Nick Levine also of Digital Spy said was the most Disney-affiliated single with club appeal since Miley Cyrus' "See You Again". When commenting on whether Gomez would be a mainstay in music, Levine said, "It's too soon to tell - but most Scando-popettes would dye their locks brunette for this tune." Although stating that it was very cliche, a writer for Popjustice said that the song "seems like a boundary-smashing avant garde curiosity when you put it alongside most other Hollywood Records output." Bill Lamb of About.com ranked "Naturally" at number eighty-four on his list of "Top 100 Pop Songs of 2010".

== Chart performance ==
After debuting its first week at sixty-five on Billboard's US Hot Digital Songs, holiday sales for the single subsequently pushed the song to jump to thirty-four. These digital sales made the song the "Hot Shot Debut" on the Billboard Hot 100 at number thirty-nine for the issue dated January 9, 2010, eventually rising to twenty-nine on the Hot 100 and eighteen on the Canadian Hot 100. On the week labeled February 13, 2010, due to radio impact, the song debuted at forty on the US Pop Songs chart, and was the Hot Shot Debut at thirty-nine on the Hot Dance/Club Play Songs chart where it peaked at number one. The song was certified Platinum on July 15, 2010, in the United States by the Recording Industry Association of America for reaching a million in sales, and 4 times Platinum on July 23, 2014, for sales and streaming. As of August 2014, the single had sold 2,006,000 copies. It was also certified Platinum in Canada by the Canadian Recording Industry Association for sales of 80,000 units.

"Naturally" debuted at forty-six on the Australian Singles Chart and at twenty on the New Zealand Singles Chart. In the United Kingdom, "Naturally" entered and peaked on the UK Singles Chart at number seven, the first top ten single for a Disney Channel star since Hilary Duff with her 2005 single "Wake Up" which also charted at number seven. In January 2021, it was certified Silver by the British Phonographic Industry for sales and streams exceeding 200,000. The song additionally charted in several European countries, appearing in the top ten of Ireland and Hungary, and elsewhere in charts in Austria, Germany, and Belgium, and Switzerland, among others. The chartings in European countries propelled the song to peak at nineteen on the European Hot 100.

== Music video ==
A screenshot of Gomez and band member Ethan Roberts back dropped by colorful background in the music video of "Naturally".

The music video was filmed on November 14, 2009, and premiered on Disney Channel on December 11, 2009, following the airing of Phineas and Ferb Christmas Vacation. The special effects of the video are more complex than that of the band's first single, "Falling Down". Lead singer Gomez said, "The video is very different from any other video that I've done," and added, "it has a lot more fierce clothes and a lot of fun colors." Two alternate video versions were released for the Ralphi Rosario Remix and the Dave Audé Remix. The video features Gomez sporting different outfits and appearing on black, red, and pink backdrops with the band performing the song. The music video was directed by Chris Dooley. Chris Ryan of MTV News called Gomez a "dancing queen" and said that she "seems cool and confident throughout the video."

== Track listing ==
- Naturally (The Remixes) EP (US)
1. "Naturally" (Radio Edit) – 3:08
2. "Naturally" (Dave Audé Radio Remix) – 4:01
3. "Naturally" (Ralphi Rosario Radio Remix) – 3:39
4. "Naturally" (Disco Fries Radio Remix) – 3:57
- UK iTunes single
1. "Naturally" (UK radio mix) – 3:05
2. "Naturally" (Instrumental) – 3:22
- UK Remixes EP
1. "Naturally" (Original Edit) - 3:10
2. "Naturally" (Dave Audé Club Mix) – 7:43
3. "Naturally" (Dave Audé Dub) - 7:23
4. "Naturally" (Ralphi Rosario Extended Mix) – 9:09
5. "Naturally" (Ralphi Rosario Big Dub) - 8:50
6. "Naturally" (Disco Fries Extended Mix) – 5:28
7. "Naturally" (Disco Fries Dub) - 5:51
- German CD single
1. "Naturally" – 3:08
2. "Kiss & Tell" – 3:17

== Credits and personnel ==
Recording and Management

- Mastered at Capitol Mastering (Los Angeles, California)
- Antonina Songs (ASCAP), Akashic Field Music (BMI), Mafia Della Roccia o/b/o Itself, Devrim Music (BMI). Rights for Antonina Songs (ASCAP) administered by Downtown Music Publishing LLC.

Personnel

- Selena Gomez – lead vocals
- Antonina Armato – songwriter, producer
- Tim James – songwriter, producer, mixing
- Devrim Karaoglu – songwriter, co-producer
- Steve Hammons – engineering
- Nigel Lundemo – engineering
- Adam Comstock – second engineering
- Paul Palmer – mixing
- Jimmy Messer – guitars
- Brooke Adams – additional background vocals
- Robert Vosgien – mastering

Credits and personnel adapted from Kiss & Tell album liner notes.

== Charts ==
=== Weekly charts ===
Weekly chart performance for "Naturally"
| Chart (2010) | Peak position |
|---|---|
| Australia (ARIA) | 46 |
| Austria (Ö3 Austria Top 40) | 37 |
| Belgium (Ultratop 50 Flanders) | 7 |
| Belgian Airplay (Ultratop Flanders) | 8 |
| Belgium (Ultratop 50 Wallonia) | 10 |
| Belgian Airplay (Ultratop Wallonia) | 8 |
| Canada Hot 100 (Billboard) | 18 |
| Czech Republic Airplay (ČNS IFPI) | 39 |
| Europe (European Hot 100 Singles) | 19 |
| Germany (GfK) | 14 |
| Hungary (Rádiós Top 40) | 22 |
| Hungary (Single Top 40) | 4 |
| Ireland (IRMA) | 7 |
| New Zealand (Recorded Music NZ) | 20 |
| Scottish Singles Sales (Official Charts) | 5 |
| Slovakia Airplay (ČNS IFPI) | 2 |
| Spain (Promusicae) | 36 |
| Sweden (Sverigetopplistan) | 56 |
| Switzerland (Schweizer Hitparade) | 54 |
| UK Singles (Official Charts) | 7 |
| US Billboard Hot 100 | 29 |
| US Dance Club Songs (Billboard) | 1 |
| US Dance/Mix Show Airplay (Billboard) | 1 |
| US Pop Airplay (Billboard) | 12 |

=== Year-end charts ===
| Chart (2010) | Position |
|---|---|
| Belgium (Ultratop 50 Flanders) | 53 |
| Belgium (Ultratop 50 Wallonia) | 70 |
| Canada (Canadian Hot 100) | 89 |
| UK Singles (OCC) | 160 |
| US Billboard Hot 100 | 77 |
| US Hot Dance Club Songs (Billboard) | 27 |

== Certifications ==
| Region | Certification | Certified units/sales |
|---|---|---|
| Brazil (Pro-Música Brasil) | Gold | 30,000^{‡} |
| Canada (Music Canada) | Platinum | 40,000^{*} |
| United Kingdom (BPI) | Silver | 200,000^{‡} |
| United States (RIAA) | 4× Platinum | 4,000,000^{‡} |
^{*} Sales figures based on certification alone.^{‡} Sales+streaming figures based on certification alone.

== Release history ==
| Region | Date | Format(s) | Version(s) |
|---|---|---|---|
| United States | December 11, 2009 | Digital download | Disco Fries remix |
| Australia | February 2, 2010 | Digital download | Disco Fries remix |
| Belgium | February 26, 2010 | Digital download | Radio edit |
| Belgium | March 19, 2010 | Digital download | EP |
| Belgium | March 19, 2010 | Digital download | Album version/B-side |
| Ireland | April 8, 2010 | Digital download | Radio edit |
| Ireland | April 8, 2010 | Digital download | EP |
| United Kingdom | April 8, 2010 | Digital download | Album version |
| United Kingdom | April 8, 2010 | Digital download | EP |
| Germany | April 9, 2010 | CD single | Radio edit |

== See also ==
- List of number-one dance singles of 2010 (U.S.)
