= Travie McCoy discography =

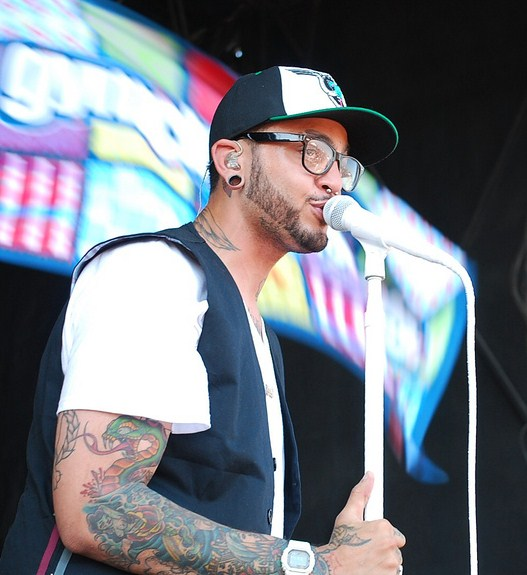
- Travie McCoy performing on the Warped Tour in 2008
- Studio albums: 2
- Singles: 24

American rapper and singer Travie McCoy has released two solo studio albums and twenty-four singles, including fifteen as a featured artist.

In early May 2010, McCoy released the hit single "Billionaire" with Bruno Mars, which was successful in Europe and the US. McCoy released his first solo album, Lazarus, which included the song, on June 8, 2010. McCoy had been working in the project for the past year and a half. The album debuted at number 25 on the US Billboard 200 chart with sales of 15,000 copies. On August 21, 2010 Lazarus was released in Europe and entered the UK Albums Chart at number 69. "Need You" was the second single from the album in the US, released in September 2010. "We'll Be Alright" was released on October 25, 2010, as the second single in the United Kingdom. On July 15, 2022, McCoy released his second studio album, Never Slept Better. The album was supported by the singles "A Spoonful of Cinnamon" and "Loved Me Back to Life", which were also made accompanying music videos. Despite releasing to mainly positive reviews, neither the album nor any of its singles charted in the United States or Europe.

== Studio albums ==
List of studio albums, with selected chart positions and sales figures
Title	Album details	Peak chart positions		Sales	Certifications
Title	Album details	US	UK	Sales	Certifications
Lazarus	Released: June 8, 2010 (US); Label: Nappy Boy, Fueled by Ramen, Decaydance, Atlantic; Formats: CD, digital download	25	69	US: 74,000	RIAA: Gold
Never Slept Better	Released: July 15, 2022; Label: Hopeless; Formats: CD, digital download, streaming	—	—		

== Singles ==
=== As lead artist ===
List of singles as lead artist, with selected chart positions and certifications, showing year released and album name
Title	Year	Peak chart positions										Certifications	Album
Title	Year	US	US Pop	AUS	CAN	GER	IRL	NLD	NZ	SWI	UK	Certifications	Album
"Billionaire" (featuring Bruno Mars)	2010	4	3	5	12	16	2	1	2	14	3	RIAA: 4× Platinum; ARIA: 2× Platinum; BPI: Platinum; RMNZ: 3× Platinum	Lazarus
"Need You"	2010	— (Note: "Need You" did not enter the Billboard Hot 100, but peaked at number six on the Bubbling Under Hot 100 Singles chart, which acts as an extension to the Hot 100.)	36	—	—	—	—	—	—	—	—		Lazarus
"We'll Be Alright"	2010	—	—	51	—	—	—	82	14	—	115	RMNZ: Gold	Lazarus
"Rough Water" (featuring Jason Mraz)	2013	82	20	—	—	—	—	—	38	—	—		Non-album singles
"Keep On Keeping On" (featuring Brendon Urie)	2014	—	—	—	—	—	—	—	—	—	—		Non-album singles
"Golden" (featuring Sia)	2015	—	—	4	—	—	—	—	20	—	—	ARIA: Platinum; RMNZ: Gold	Non-album singles
"A Spoonful of Cinnamon"	2021	—	—	—	—	—	—	—	—	—	—		Never Slept Better
"Loved Me Back to Life"	2021	—	—	—	—	—	—	—	—	—	—		Never Slept Better
"Stop It"	2022	—	—	—	—	—	—	—	—	—	—		Never Slept Better
"The Bridge" (featuring Elohim)	2022	—	—	—	—	—	—	—	—	—	—		Never Slept Better

=== As featured artist ===
List of singles as featured artist, with selected chart positions and certifications, showing year released and album name
Title	Year	Peak chart positions										Certifications	Album
Title	Year	US	US Pop	AUS	CAN	GER	IRL	NLD	NZ	SWI	UK	Certifications	Album
"Snakes on a Plane (Bring It)" (Cobra Starship featuring William Beckett, Travie McCoy and Maja Ivarsson)	2006	—	—	—	—	—	—	—	—	—	98		Snakes on a Plane: The Album
"Daylight" (Kelly Rowland featuring Travie McCoy)	2008	—	—	43	—	—	43	—	—	—	14		Ms. Kelly
"Coconut Juice" (Tyga featuring Travie McCoy)	2008	94	—	—	—	—	—	—	—	—	—		No Introduction
"Differently" (Cassie Davis featuring Travie McCoy)	2009	—	—	29	—	—	—	—	—	—	—	ARIA: Gold	Differently
"Fly" (Four Year Strong featuring Travie McCoy)	2009	—	—	—	—	—	—	—	—	—	—		Explains It All
"Famo$a" (Claudia Leitte featuring Travie McCoy)	2010	—	—	—	—	—	—	—	—	—	—		As Máscaras
"Tattoo Girl (Foreva)" (Detail featuring Lil Wayne, T-Pain and Travie McCoy)	2010	—	—	—	—	—	—	—	—	—	—		Non-album singles
"Up and Running" (Jessica Jarrell featuring Travie McCoy)	2010	—	—	—	—	—	—	—	—	—	—		Non-album singles
"Higher" (Note: Three single versions of "Higher" were released: the first features Kylie Minogue, the second features Travie McCoy and the third features them both.) (Taio Cruz featuring Travie McCoy)	2010	24	13	25	13	3	4	11	5	4	8	RIAA: Platinum; ARIA: Gold; BPI: Gold; IFPI SWI: Platinum; MC: Platinum; RMNZ: Gold	Rokstarr
"Pretty Girls" (Iyaz featuring Travie McCoy)	2011	43	18	—	—	—	—	—	—	—	—		Non-album single
"I Came to Party" (Deuce featuring Truth and Travie McCoy)	2012	—	—	—	—	—	—	—	—	—	—		Nine Lives
"Love Me" (Stooshe featuring Travie McCoy)	2012	—	—	—	—	—	—	—	—	—	5		London with the Lights On
"Mind Your Manners" (Remix) (Chiddy Bang featuring Travie McCoy and Icona Pop)	2012	—	—	—	—	—	—	—	—	—	—	RMNZ: Gold	Non-album single
"Wrapped Up" (Olly Murs featuring Travie McCoy)	2014	—	40	15	—	11	7	—	—	18	3	ARIA: Gold; BPI: Platinum; GLF: Platinum; RMNZ: Gold	Never Been Better
"Dazed and Confused" (Jake Miller featuring Travie McCoy)	2014	—	—	—	—	—	—	—	—	—	—		Dazed and Confused
"Call Me Sir" (Train featuring Cam and Travie McCoy)	2018	—	—	—	—	—	—	—	—	—	—		Greatest Hits
"—" denotes a recording that did not chart or was not released in that territory.

=== Other appearances ===
List of other appearances, showing year released and album name
Title	Year	Album
"One at a Time" (as a member of MTV's Staying Alive foundation)	2009	Non-album single

=== Promotional singles ===
Title	Year	Album
"Matches" (featuring David Correy)	2015	Non-album single

== Guest appearances ==
List of non-single guest appearances, with other performing artists, showing year released and album name
Title	Year	Other artist(s)	Album
"This Is How It Goes Down"	2008	Pink	Funhouse
"Overdose"	2008	Mickey Factz, Drake	The Leak Vol. 2: The Inspiration
"What a Catch, Donnie"	2008	Fall Out Boy	Folie à Deux
"Grand Groove"	2009	J.J. Brown, Dezmatic	Connect the Dots!
"Chelsea Smile"	2009	Bring Me the Horizon	Suicide Season: Cut Up!
"Yeah Yeah"	2010	Cheryl Cole	Messy Little Raindrops
"Bad"	2010	Rich Hil	Limosa Nostra v.1
"When I Approach"	2011	Livin, Joe Budden	City Of Brotherly Love
"The Way You Watch Me"	2011	The Saturdays	On Your Radar
"I'll Never Be"	2012	T-Pain, Tay Dizm	Stoic
