= Dreamlab (production team) =

Australian record producing and songwriting team

- Origin: Sydney
- Genres: Pop; pop rock; dance-pop; electropop; hip hop
- Occupations: Producers; songwriters; musicians
- Years active: 2002–present
- Members: Daniel James; Leah Haywood

Dreamlab is an Australian record producing and songwriting team, composed of Daniel James and Leah Haywood, based in Los Angeles. The team's genres range from pop and dance to hip hop.

== Career ==
James and Haywood initially began as a collaboration, releasing their self-titled EP Dreamlab. Dreamlab later became their production and songwriting team name. Before moving into Dreamlab productions, Haywood received success in mainstream music as a Singer-songwriter with her debut album Leah. In 2001 Haywood was nominated for Best Female Artist as well as Most Performed Australian Work for her hit single "We Think It's Love" at the Australian Recording Industry Association (ARIA) awards. Around this time James moved to the band 'Receiver' as the lead vocalist, touring the United States and Australia.

After relocating from Australia to Los Angeles, Dreamlab's initial success came with producing a majority of the debut release of Aly and AJ, "Into the Rush". The album was later certified Platinum by the RIAA. From then Dreamlab has gone on to coproduce and cowrite for Grammy Award nominated artists Demi Lovato, Nicki Minaj, Selena Gomez, Miley Cyrus, Vanessa Hudgens, and in 2011 wrote and produced three songs from the Girls' Generation self titled Double platinum selling album. Haywood has also performed background vocals for Britney Spears and Celine Dion. In 2011 dreamlab set up the imprint, Layer Cake Records, with their first signing being Hunter Parrish.

== Discography ==
Year	Artist	Song / Album	Details
1999	Celine Dion		Vocals, ("That's the Way It Is")
2001	Leah Haywood	Leah	Co-writer, (Leah)
2001	Leah Haywood	What Women Want soundtrack	Co-writer, ("We Think It's Love")
2003	Mandy Moore	Stuart Little 2	Writer, ("Top of The World")
2005	Aly & AJ	Into the Rush	Producer, writer, ("Rush","In a Second") Producer ("No One", "Collapsed", "Out of the Blue", "Something More", "Protecting Me", "I Am One of Them")
2006	Vanessa Hudgens	V	Producer, writer, ("Promise", "Drive", "Afraid")
2007	The Cheetah Girls	TCG	Producer, writer, ("So Bring It On","Uh-Oh")
2008	Britney Spears	Circus	Vocals, ("Out From Under")
2008	Vanessa Hudgens	Identified	Programmer, arranger ("Did It Ever Cross Your Mind", "Papercut")
2008	Ryan Cabrera	The Moon Under Water	Producer, writer ("Say", "Relax", "Say You Will", "In Between Lights", "Should've Kissed You") producer ("I Will Remember You", "Please Don't Lie To Me", "How Bout Tonight")
2008	Jordan Pruitt	Permission to Fly	Producer, writer ("One Love", "Simple Things")
2008	Michael Paynter		Producer, co-writer, ("Lay My Armour Down", "Let Go")
2009	Selena Gomez & The Scene	Original Motion Picture Hollywood Soundtrack	Producer, writer ("Magical")
2009	Miley Cyrus	Hannah Montana 3	Producer, writer, ("Supergirl")
2009	Ashley Tisdale	Guilty Pleasure	Producer, writer ("Masquerade")
2009	Cassie Davis	Differently	Producer, writer ("Do It Again")
2009	Camera Can't Lie	Days & Days	Producer, writer ("The One That Got Away")
2009	LoveHateHero	America Underwater	Producer, co-writer (America Underwater)
2010	The Wanted	The Wanted	Producer, co-writer ("Say It on the Radio")
2010	Debi Nova	Drummer Boy	Producer, writer
2010	Allison Iraheta	Just Like You	Producer, writer ("Pieces")
2010	SoundGirl	Something to Dream About	Producer, co-writer ("Hero")
2010	BC Jean		Producer, writer ("Shattered", "Get All Over Me")
2011	Demi Lovato	Unbroken	Producer, co-writer ("Unbroken", "Mistake", "Hold Up")
2011	Selena Gomez & The Scene	When The Sun Goes Down	Producer, co-writer ("Hit The Lights")
2011	Girls' Generation	Girls' Generation	Co-writer ("I'm in Love With the Hero", "Beautiful Stranger", "Born to Be a Lady")
2011	Avery		Producer, co-writer ("Go Screw Yourself", "That Girl", "Next Level")
2012	Nicki Minaj	Pink Friday: Roman Reloaded	Co-producer, co-writer ("Marilyn Monroe")
2012	Bridgit Mendler	Hello My Name Is...	Producer, co-writer, Mixed ("Blonde")
2013	Selena Gomez	Stars Dance	Producer, co-writer ("Like A Champion", "Write Your Name", "Music Feels Better", "Lover In Me")
2013	Selena Gomez	"Come & Get It"	Vocal producer
2013	Nikki Williams	"Glowing"	Co-producer, co-writer
2014	The Veronicas	The Veronicas (album)	Producer, writer. ("Cruel", "Teenage Millionaire")
2015	Selena Gomez	Revival	Vocal producer, writer, editor ("Sober", "Good For You", "Camouflage", "Survivors", "Perfect", "Cologne")
2017	Bea Miller	Chapter Two: Red	Producer ("Like That")
2017	Fifth Harmony	Fifth Harmony	Producer ("Make You Mad", "Messy")
2019	Kygo & Chelsea Cutler	"Not OK"	Co-producer, writer, vocal producer
2019	Katy Perry	"Never Really Over"	Co-producer, writer
2019	Marshmello (with YUNGBLUD & blackbear)	"Tongue Tied"	Co-writer
2020	Blackpink	"Lovesick Girls"	Co-Writer
2021	Alan Walker	"Fake a Smile"	Co-Writer, Co-Producer
2021	Justin Bieber	"Off My Face"	Co-Writer, Co-Producer
2021	Jonas Blue & LÉON	"Hear Me Say"	Co-writer, Vocal Producer
2021	Walk The Moon	"Giants"	Co-writer
