= Off My Face =

2021 song by Justin Bieber

Song by Justin Bieber

from the album Justice
- Released: March 19, 2021
- Genre: Soft rock
- Length: 2:36
- Label: Def Jam
- Songwriters: Justin Bieber; Daniel James; Leah Haywood; Jake Torrey; Tia Scola
- Producers: Dreamlab; Jake Torrey

Visualizer
- "Off My Face" on YouTube

"Off My Face" is a song by Canadian singer Justin Bieber. It is the fourth track from his sixth studio album, Justice, released through Def Jam Recordings on March 19, 2021. Bieber wrote the song with producers Dreamlab (Daniel James and Leah Haywood) and Jake Torrey, alongside Tia Scola.

== Composition and lyrics ==
"Off My Face" is set in the key of E major and has a moderate tempo of 100 beats per minute. Critics made comparisons with the song to Simon & Garfunkel and Bieber's 2015 single, "Love Yourself". "Off My Face" serves soft-rock stylings and drunk-in-love double entendres. The song lyrically sees Bieber reflect on what love has taught him and how it helped him discover his purpose in life over a mellow guitar melody. The acoustic-led song was described by NME as "playful" and was thought that the singer was praising his wife, model Hailey Bieber. NYU News also described the song as one of their favorite songs from the album, commenting: "This simple, beautiful ode to his wife, composed of fine guitar picking and airy falsetto notes, makes the listener feel as if the artist is singing directly to them" and praised "Bieber's easy vocals and smooth, river like riffs", which "make the listener feel warm and fuzzy, entirely at ease". "Off My Face" also contains lyrics about how far the couple have gotten in their relationship. The song "works in a reference to speaking in tongues", to which Chris DeVille of Stereogum thought "could be perceived as a double entendre about oral sex". It sees Bieber flex his higher notes in the chorus.

== Reception and commercial performance ==
Ana Clara Ribeiro of PopMatters said that the "beautifully crafted" song is "a good display of Bieber's vocal range" and "responsible for showing Bieber at his best". Pitchfork's Rawiya Kameir found "Off My Face" to be a standout on Justice, writing the "play on his newfound sobriety" is "sweet, full-hearted, and entirely convincing, in spite of the cliché". Placing it seventh on his ranking of Justice tracks, Billboard critic Jason Lipshutz thought Bieber sold "the stripped-down romance with an earnest vocal take". New Statesman writer Emily Bootle remarked that the song "would make an excellent first dance option for those who want to be sincere, but cannot quite stomach Ed Sheeran's 'Perfect'". The Washington Post's Allison Stewart called the track "a distant, less catchy, not-about-cocaine cousin" of the Weeknd's "Can't Feel My Face".

Following the release of Justice, "Off My Face" charted on multiple national record charts, including Australia (42), Canada (25), Denmark (15), Iceland (40), Portugal (70), Slovakia (46), and Sweden (68). On the US Billboard Hot 100, it debuted at number 64 as one of the album's 11 new entries. On November 4, 2022, "Off My Face" was certified gold by the Recording Industry Association of America (RIAA). The song additionally saw moderate success in South Korea several months after Justice's release, peaking at number 35 on the Gaon Digital Chart. It received a platinum streaming certification by the Korea Music Content Association (KMCA) on July 6, 2023.

== Live performance and other usage ==
For the song's live debut, Bieber performed "Off My Face" as part of his "Live from Paris" concert special shot at the Hôtel de Crillon, where he played several of his recent tracks from Justice. On May 10, 2021, South Korean singer IU shared on Instagram a 30-second clip of her covering the song with an acoustic guitar, singing parts of the chorus before humming the rest of it. Chaeyoung of Twice covered the track for the group's "Melody Project" series. On May 30, 2022, Enhypen's Heeseung shared a video covering the song on the group's official YouTube channel. He performed his rendition of the track from a spacious room with floor-to-ceiling windows.

== Credits and personnel ==
- Justin Bieber – vocals, songwriting
- Dreamlab
  - Daniel James – production, songwriting, recording
  - Leah Haywood – production, songwriting
- Jake Torrey – production, songwriting, guitar
- Tia Scola – songwriting
- Josh Gudwin – mixing, vocal production
- Heidi Wang – mixing assistance
- Colin Leonard – mastering
- Devin Nakao – recording
- Ryan Lytle – recording assistance
- Chris "Tek" O'Ryan – engineering

== Charts ==
=== Weekly charts ===
Weekly chart performance for "Off My Face"
Chart (2021)	Peak position
Australia (ARIA)	42
Canada Hot 100 (Billboard)	25
Denmark (Tracklisten)	15
Global 200 (Billboard)	34
Iceland (Tónlistinn)	40
New Zealand Hot Singles (RMNZ)	5
Portugal (AFP)	70
Slovakia Singles Digital (ČNS IFPI)	46
South Korea (Gaon)	35
Sweden (Sverigetopplistan)	68
UK Audio Streaming (OCC)	52
US Billboard Hot 100	64

=== Year-end charts ===
"Off My Face" year-end chart performance
Chart (2021)	Position
South Korea (Gaon)	75
Chart (2022)	Position
South Korea (Circle)	67
Chart (2023)	Position
South Korea (Circle)	88
Chart (2024)	Position
South Korea (Circle)	166

== Certifications ==
Certifications for "Off My Face"
Region	Certification	Certified units/sales
Australia (ARIA)	Gold	35,000^{‡}
Brazil (Pro-Música Brasil)	Platinum	40,000^{‡}
Denmark (IFPI Danmark)	Gold	45,000^{‡}
New Zealand (RMNZ)	Gold	15,000^{‡}
United States (RIAA)	Gold	500,000^{‡}
Streaming
South Korea (KMCA)	Platinum	100,000,000^{†}
^{‡} Sales+streaming figures based on certification alone.^{†} Streaming-only figures based on certification alone.
