= Sober (Selena Gomez song) =

Song by Selena Gomez

from the album Revival
- Released: October 9, 2015
- Recorded: 2015
- Studio: Westlake Recording Studios (Los Angeles, California); The Hide Out Studios (London)
- Genre: Synth-pop
- Length: 3:14
- Label: Interscope; Polydor
- Songwriters: Chloe Angelides; Jacob Kasher Hindlin; Julia Michaels; Tor Hermansen; Mikkel Eriksen; Selena Gomez
- Producers: Stargate; Dreamlab (vocal producer)

"Sober" is a song by American singer Selena Gomez from her second solo studio album, Revival (2015), included as the fifth track on the record. The song was leaked two days prior the album's release, on October 7, 2015, and was originally scheduled to be released as the album's fifth single following "Kill Em with Kindness". Gomez collaborated with songwriters Chloe Angelides, Jacob Kasher Hindlin, and Julia Michaels, along with Norwegian duo Tor Hermansen and Mikkel Eriksen, who handled production under their stage name Stargate. Frequent collaborator Dreamlab handled the vocal production as well as background vocals. Driven to create a unique sound for herself, the singer focused on lyrics that reflected personal experiences, along with referencing influential albums of her youth, specifically Christina Aguilera's fourth studio album Stripped (2002).

"Sober" is a midtempo synth-pop power ballad based around an expansive 1980s-influenced song structure; the production features chunky beats and synth stabs. Inspired by social awkwardness after a night of drinking, the track describes a dysfunctional relationship which falls apart due to her lover's complex relationship with alcohol and how it changes their personality. "Sober" was well received by music critics, many of whom deemed it an album highlight. Praise was given to the track's emotional depth, vocal delivery, and production, while drawing comparisons to the works of Lorde, Tinashe, Sia, and Lana Del Rey. Upon release, "Sober" peaked on the US Billboard Bubbling Under Hot 100 Singles chart at number 22.

== Background ==
"This whole record is extremely intimate. I did executive produce it. I wanted to know that every single song meant the world to me, whether I wrote it or not."

— Gomez, during an interview with Time

For the first time in her career, Gomez was given full creative control following her signing with Interscope Records. She expressed frustration and constraint with the songs chosen for her earlier in her career, and felt a disconnect from the music both personally and professionally. During the creation of Revival, the singer emphasized the importance of creating a distinct sound for herself, telling Nolan Feeney of Time that "there were times in my career where I sang things that just weren’t me and weren’t for me. You can hear it in my voice. You can hear it when it’s inauthentic." Gomez aimed to create autobiographical songs which shared personal stories, whether or not she wrote them. Citing the therapeutic process of writing "The Heart Wants What It Wants" for her greatest hits album For You (2014), the singer was inspired to separate herself from her peers and convert personal experiences into the music of Revival. For "Sober", Gomez focused on using her unique vocal tone and abilities as an actress to translate feelings and emotions through her music. The singer also told producers to focus primarily on the lyrics and vocals, referencing albums of her youth that dealt with themes of growing up in the spotlight, particularly Christina Aguilera's album Stripped (2002).

Being in full creative control, Gomez struggled on several songs including "Sober" to tell stories that were personal and elegant, yet "not over the top". To achieve her desired sound, she chose to work with multiple songwriters, including singer-songwriter Chloe Angelides. In an interview with Time, Gomez stated that for her, the track was not inspired by a single person, but instead about her experiences with drinking and social awkwardness, saying: "I would hang out with people and they would drink and they’re so fun, then the next day it would be weird." "Sober" was initially conceived during a late-night conversation between the singer and Angelides in a hotel hallway, where the pair exchanged their own personal stories on the topic. After Gomez left the hotel, Angelides wrote the lyrics to "Sober", and presented it to Gomez the following day.

== Recording and release ==
After being shown the initial version of "Sober", Gomez brought the song to executive producers Tim Blacksmith and Danny D, who enlisted Norwegian duo Tor Hermansen and Mikkel Eriksen, also known as StarGate, to work on the track. Their work during this time produced several songs for Revival, including "Same Old Love" and "Cologne". Additional songwriting and lyrics were written by Gomez, Jacob Kasher Hindlin, and Julia Michaels. Gomez worked with Eriksen and Miles Walker to record the song at Westlake Studios in Los Angeles, California, as well as with Mike Anderson at The Hide Out Studios in London, England. Leah Haywood provided additional background vocals. Gomez's vocals were produced by American production team Dreamlab at Westlake, and the engineering was handled by Rob Ellmore with assistance from Daniela Rivera.

In its final stages, "Sober" was mixed by Phil Tan at Ninja Club Studios in Atlanta, Georgia. In a March 2017 interview with Mike Wass of Idolator, Hindlin, a personal friend of Gomez and the song's co-writer, revealed that "Sober" was intended to be the album's fifth single after "Kill Em with Kindness". He recounted having a meeting with the singer, where she expressed her readiness to move on from the Revival-era and release new music, telling him: 'I love you, but I'm ready to put out new stuff'."

== Composition ==
"Sober"
A 19-second sample of "Sober"; showcasing the song's blend of synthpop with melancholic lyrics.

"Sober" is a "booming" and "emotive" midtempo synthpop power ballad. Its "studded" and "shimmering" production consists of "chunky" beats, hand-claps, and dark '80s-influenced synthesizers. The chorus is characterized by shimmering vocal melodies, During the intro and outro of "Sober", the producers use a digitally manipulated, chopped and screwed vocal sample.

You're just oblivious to what's going on, and you have to be connected with yourself to really dissect what it is that you're feeling. You can't need a person or need anything to get you through life.

— Gomez, on the song's theme of leaving an unhealthy relationship

Lyrically the track is written about a failing relationship caused by a partner who abuses alcohol. The singer speaks of a man who faces a disconnect between his personality while drunk and sober, causing the inability to forge a connection. Gomez describes a lover who can only show his true emotions while intoxicated. Later in the song she expresses the pain she feels having wasted so much time into her relationship, and decides to leave her dysfunctional lover: "You've got a hold on me / You're like a wasted dream / I gave you everything / But you don't know how to love me when you're sober". During an interview with Nicole Mastrogiannis of iHeartRadio, the singer explained the meaning of the album track-by-track, saying that "Sober" was about being blinded by love in an unhealthy relationship: "It's easy to run away from your feelings, but I have to understand, and people need to understand, that you have to go through everything. You have to feel it. You gotta get through the other side as best as you can, and everyone has been in that situation where you can't help it. Even if it's not even that, it's like love drunk in a way."

Melissa Haggar of Concrete opined that the song is "an intimate reflection on how people can appear so different in certain lights." The song has been compared to the works of Tinashe and Lana Del Rey by Vulture writer Lindsay Zoladz. Additionally, Idolator writer Mike Wass compared the song to the music of other "relatable-pop" artists, such as Alessia Cara and Lorde. Katherine St. Asaph of Time magazine noted that "Sober" was "disarmingly peppy" and set to "the sort of story you’d find in an Evanescence single".

== Critical reception ==
Upon its release, "Sober" received positive reviews from music critics, with several declaring it an album highlight. Comparing its production to the works of Australian recording artist Sia, George Griffiths of Redbrick deemed it the best song of Gomez's career; praising its placement as the album's musical centerpiece. He elaborated that the themes of empowerment and vulnerability present throughout Revival coalesced into "Sober" "more clearly and coherently than you could ever have imagined". In her review, Concrete writer Melissa Haggar called "Sober" a key example of the personal and meaningful lyrics behind Revival, calling the track "somber and satisfying". Haggar went on to say that the singer: "reflects similar melancholy emotions in bonus tracks like the bittersweet ballad 'Nobody' and the sweeping 'Cologne', which display her more vulnerable side." Idolator writer Mike Wass felt that the track was among the album's best tracks, and compared it to Alessia Cara's single "Here" from her debut album Know-It-All (2015) and Lorde's debut album Pure Heroine (2013), saying "With the rise of relatable-pop, this bittersweet pop anthem should get a warm reception at radio. Emo posturing doesn't get any catchier."

Vulture writer Lindsay Zoladz called "Sober" a standout, suggesting that it receive the single treatment "or — better yet — turned into a he-said/she-said mash-up with the Weeknd's 'The Hills'." Katherine St. Asaph of Time noted that although the middle section of most albums tend to be filler, on Revival it contains the standout tracks, including "Sober". Writing for Entertainment Focus, Pip Ellwood-Hughes noted that the song contained the best vocals on the album, declaring it as a standout track along with "Kill Em With Kindness", "Hands to Myself", and "Good for You". Mike Nied of Idolator declared that "Sober" deserved to be released as a single.

== Credits and personnel ==
Credits and personnel adapted from Revival album liner notes and BMI.

Recording and management

- Recorded at Westlake Recording Studios (Los Angeles, California) and The Hide Out Studios (London, England)
- Mixed at Ninja Club Studios (Atlanta, Georgia)
- Mastered at Sterling Sound (New York City)
- Published by Chloe Angelides Publishing/Where Da Kasz At (BMI), Virginia Beach Music/Prescription Songs (ASCAP), Screaming Beauty Music/Bok Music (BMI) and EMI April Music (ASCAP) on behalf of EMI Music Publishing Ltd. (PRS)

Personnel

- Selena Gomez – lead vocals, songwriting
- Stargate – songwriting, production, instrumentation, recording
- Dreamlab – vocal production
- Tim Blacksmith – executive production
- Danny D – executive production
- Chloe Angelides – songwriting
- Jacob Kasher Hindlin – songwriting
- Julia Michaels – songwriting
- Rob Ellmore – vocal engineering
- Miles Walker – recording
- Mike Andersong – recording
- Leah Haywood – background vocals
- Phil Than – mixing for RiotProof Productions
- Daniela Rivera – additional mixing engineering, mixing engineering assistant
- Chris Gehringer – mastering

== Charts ==
Chart (2015)	Peak position
US Bubbling Under Hot 100 (Billboard)	22
US Pop Digital Songs (Billboard)	36
