= Leah Haywood =

Australian record producer and songwriter

- Born: Leah Jacqueline Cooney
- Origin: Perth, Western Australia, Australia
- Genres: Pop; pop rock; dance-pop; electropop; hip hop
- Occupations: Record producer; songwriter; singer
- Years active: 2000–present
- Label: Epic

Leah Jacqueline Cooney, known professionally as Haywood (formerly Leah Haywood), is an Australian record producer and songwriter.

Born in New Zealand, she grew up in Perth, Western Australia, and recorded a top-40 album, Leah, released in 2001 on Epic Records, which contained her top-10 single, "We Think It's Love". Two more top-40 hits followed with "Crazy" in 2000 and "Takin' Back What's Mine" in 2001. She also performed backing vocals for Celine Dion on "That's the Way It Is", the 1999 hit single from Dion's album All the Way... A Decade of Song. Haywood's song "Summer of Love" was the theme for Channel Ten Australia at the Start of 2002. She opened for Ricky Martin on the Australian leg of his International tour.

Haywood was nominated as Best Female Artist at the Australian Record Industry Association (ARIA) Music Awards of 2001. "We Think It's Love" was nominated for Most Performed Australian Work at the 2001 Australian Performing Rights Association (APRA) Awards. In 2002, Haywood and husband, Daniel Pringle, relocated to Los Angeles to run Dreamlab, their production and songwriting company.

== Career ==
Haywood was born in New Zealand, but moved to Perth, Western Australia, at a young age, where she trained on piano and vocals before moving to Sydney by 1999. She signed with Epic Records (Australia) to release her debut single, "We Think It's Love", in February 2000, which peaked at number 7 on the ARIA Singles Chart. Two more Top 40 hits followed with "Crazy" in August and "Takin' Back What's Mine" in April 2001. Her debut album, Leah, followed in July and peaked in the Top 40 on the ARIA Albums Chart.

In 2002, Haywood moved to Los Angeles, California with her husband, Daniel James, and started Dreamlab, a production and songwriting company managed by Advanced Alternative Media Inc.. A discography of songs written, co-written and/or produced by Leah Haywood/Dreamlab may be viewed on the AAM website.

From their Los Angeles studio, Haywood and James, as Dreamlab, co-wrote and co-produced Aly and AJ's debut top 40 single "Rush" and produced eight tracks on the record; which has sold in excess of a million records worldwide. They have worked with actors Emmy Rossum and Keanu Reeves on their respective musical endeavours, and had further releases in 2008, including Epic Records rock band, Automatic Loveletter. Dreamlab co-wrote half the tracks and produced the entire record for Ryan Cabrera. They have printed a limited number of copies of their electronica EP self-titled Dreamlab. An LP version was completed by late 2008.

Also in late 2008, Haywood provided background vocals for the ballad "Out from Under" sung by American pop singer Britney Spears off her sixth studio album, Circus. In 2009, Haywood co-wrote Perth singer Cassie Davis' third single, "Do It Again", and "Pieces", a track on Allison Iraheta's debut album Just Like You, she also wrote "Masquerade" for Ashley Tisdale's second album, Guilty Pleasure . She is also known to have co-written and produced at least two tracks from Australian singer Amy Pearson's upcoming second studio album Aftershock, and these are the title track "Aftershock" and "Doctor Love". In 2011, Haywood co-wrote three songs on American singer-songwriter Demi Lovato's third studio album "Unbroken"; "Hold Up", "Mistake" and title track "Unbroken". Also co-wrote "Hit the Lights" by American singer Selena Gomez from When the Sun Goes Down. Haywood also co-wrote and co-produced the track "Marilyn Monroe" by American rapper Nicki Minaj from Pink Friday: Roman Reloaded.

In 2020, Haywood co-wrote "Lovesick Girls" by South Korean girl group Blackpink from their debut studio album, The Album.

In March 2021, Haywood released her first single in 20 years as an artist under the new stage name Haywood, titled "Cheers to Us" featuring Jackson Foote of American pop duo, Loote. A second single, "Backbeat", was released in June with "Bleeder", the third single, released in August. In April 2022, Haywood and her husband were nominated at the 64th Annual Grammy Awards for their work on Justin Bieber's Justice album track, "Off My Face". Haywood's second studio album (and first under the "Haywood" stage name), Pressure on My Heart, was released in July 2022.

== Discography ==
=== Studio albums ===
Title	Album details	Peak chart positions
Title	Album details	AUS
Leah	Released: 23 July 2001; Label: Sony Music Australia (499827.2); Format: CD	40
Pressure on My Heart (as Haywood)	Released: 15 July 2022; Label: Palm Tree Records (Joint venture with Sony Music Entertainment); Format: Digital download, streaming	—

=== Singles ===
List of singles, with selected chart positions
Title	Year	Peak chart positions	Certifications	Album
Title	Year	AUS	Certifications	Album
"We Think It's Love"	2000	7	ARIA: Gold	Leah
"Crazy"	2000	31		Leah
"Takin' Back What's Mine"	2001	18		Leah
"Summer of Love"	2001	87		Leah
"Just to Make You"	2002	—		Leah
"Cheers to Us" (featuring Loote)	2021	—		Pressure on My Heart
"Backbeat"	2021	—		Pressure on My Heart
"Bleeder"	2021	—		Pressure on My Heart
"Swear On Love" (with Petey Martin)	2021	—		Non-album single
"New York"	2021	—		Pressure on My Heart
"Thinking of God"	2022	—		Pressure on My Heart
"Human to Fall Apart"	2022	—		Pressure on My Heart
"I Told You" (with Loote & Petey Martin)	2022	—		Pressure on My Heart

Note

- After resuming her music career in 2021, from "Cheers to Us" onwards, Haywood began being credited as just "Haywood".

== Production and songwriting credits ==
Year	Artist	Album	Details
1999	Celine Dion	All The Way, A Decade Of Song	Vocals, ("That's the Way It Is")
2002	Mandy Moore	Stuart Little 2 soundtrack	Writer, ("Top of The World")
2005	Aly & AJ	Into the Rush	Producer, Writer, ("Rush","In a Second") Producer ("No One", "Collapsed", "Out of the Blue", "Something More", "Protecting Me", "I Am One of Them")
2006	Vanessa Hudgens	V	Producer, Writer, ("Promise", "Drive", "Afraid")
2007	The Cheetah Girls	TCG	Producer, Writer, ("So Bring It On", "Uh-Oh")
2008	Britney Spears	Circus	Vocals, ("Out from Under")
2008	Vanessa Hudgens	Identified	Programmer, Arranger ("Did it Ever Cross your Mind", "Papercut")
2008	Ryan Cabrera	The Moon Under Water	Producer, Writer ("Say", "Relax", "Say You Will", "In Between Lights", "Should've Kissed You") Producer ("I Will Remember You", "Please Don't Lie To Me", "How Bout Tonight")
2008	Jordan Pruitt	Permission to Fly	Producer, Writer ("One Love", "Simple Things")
2008	Michael Paynter		Producer, Co-Writer, ("Lay My Armour Down", "Let Go")
2009	Selena Gomez & the Scene	Original Motion Picture Hollywood Soundtrack	Producer, Writer ("Magical")
2009	Miley Cyrus	Hannah Montana 3	Producer, Writer, ("Supergirl")
2009	Ashley Tisdale	Guilty Pleasure	Producer, Writer ("Masquerade")
2009	Cassie Davis	Differently	Producer, Writer ("Do It Again")
2009	Camera Can't Lie	Days & Days	Producer, Writer ("The One That Got Away")
2009	LoveHateHero	America Underwater	Producer, Co-Writer ("America Underwater")
2010	The Wanted	The Wanted	Producer, Co-Writer ("Say It on The Radio")
2010	Debi Nova		Producer, Writer ("Drummer Boy")
2010	Allison Iraheta	Just Like You	Producer, Writer ("Pieces")
2010	SoundGirl	Something to Dream About	Producer, Co-Writer ("Hero")
2010	BC Jean		Producer, Writer ("Shattered", "Get All Over Me")
2011	Demi Lovato	Unbroken	Producer, Co-Writer ("Unbroken", "Mistake", "Hold Up")
2011	Selena Gomez & the Scene	When the Sun Goes Down	Producer, Co-Writer ("Hit the Lights")
2011	Charice	Infinity	Producer, Co-Writer ("Louder")
2011	Girls' Generation	Girls' Generation	Co-Writer ("I'm in Love With the Hero", "Beautiful Stranger", "Born to Be a Lady")
2011	Avery		Producer, Co-Writer ("Go Screw Yourself", "That Girl", "Next Level")
2012	Nicki Minaj	Pink Friday: Roman Reloaded	Co-Producer, Co-Writer ("Marilyn Monroe")
2012	Bridgit Mendler	Hello My Name Is...	Producer, Co-Writer, Mixer ("Blonde")
2013	Nikki Williams	Glowing	Co-Writer
	Selena Gomez	Stars Dance	Producer, Co-Writer ("Like A Champion", "Write Your Name", "Music Feels Better", "Lover In Me")
	Selena Gomez	Come & Get It	Vocal Producer
2014	The Veronicas	The Veronicas	Producer, Writer ("Cruel", "Teenage Millionaire")
2015	Selena Gomez	Revival	Producer, Writer ("Sober", "Good For You", "Camouflage", "Survivors", "Perfect", "Cologne")
2017	Bea Miller	Chapter Two: Red	Producer, Writer ("Like That")
	Fifth Harmony	Fifth Harmony	Producer, Writer ("Make You Mad", "Messy")
2019	Kygo & Chelsea Cutler	Not OK	Producer, Writer
	Katy Perry	Never Really Over	Producer, Writer
	Marshmello (with YUNGBLUD & blackbear)	Tongue Tied	Producer, Writer
2020	Blackpink	The Album	Producer, Co-writer ("Lovesick Girls")
2021	Alan Walker	Fake a Smile	Producer, Writer
	Justin Bieber	Off My Face	Producer, Writer
	Jonas Blue & LÉON	Hear Me Say	Producer, Writer

== Awards and nominations ==
=== APRA Awards ===
The APRA Awards are held in Australia and New Zealand by the Australasian Performing Right Association to recognise songwriting skills, sales and airplay performance by its members annually.

Year	Nominee / work	Award	Result
2020	"Never Really Over" (by Katy Perry) (co-written by Haywood)	Most Performed Pop Work	Nominated

=== ARIA Music Awards ===
The ARIA Music Awards is an annual awards ceremony that recognises excellence, innovation, and achievement across all genres of Australian music. They commenced in 1987.

Year	Nominated work / Recipient	Category	Result	Ref.
2001	Takin' Back What's Mine - Leah Haywood	Best Female Artist	Nominated	

=== Grammy Awards ===
The Grammy Awards, or Grammys, are presented annually by the National Academy of Recording Arts and Sciences. The ceremony honors outstanding achievements in the music industry, with awards of the most popular interest presented during the live televised event.

Year	Nominated work	Category	Result	Ref.
2022	Justice (Triple Chucks Deluxe) - Justin Bieber (as a writer and producer on the album)	Album of the Year	Nominated	
