= Daniel James (music producer) =

Australian record producer and songwriter

- Born: 21 July 1975 (age 50)
- Genres: Pop; pop rock; dance-pop; electropop
- Occupations: Producer; songwriter; music executive
- Years active: 2000–present
- Labels: Layer Cake

Daniel James (born 21 July 1975) is an Australian record producer and songwriter. His genres include pop, dance, electropop, as well as pop rock.

== Life and career ==
=== Early life ===
James was born in Sydney, but grew up briefly in New Zealand until the age of five, when he relocated back to Sydney. Around age 12 he began singing and performing in church, which inspired him to begin a career in music. He started writing songs at the age of 17 and became involved with various touring bands, as well as his solo project Eden. Eden received airplay on 2Day FM, Sydney's top pop station as part of a song competition.

=== Career ===
In 2002 James and wife Leah Haywood met and began writing together on a duet electronic project "Dreamlab"; they went on to write "Top of the World" performed by Mandy Moore featured on the Stuart Little 2 soundtrack. They continued producing and writing together creating the production company under their most recent artist endeavour, Dreamlab. In 2004 James alongside Haywood co-wrote and co-produced Aly and AJ's debut top 40 single "Rush" and produced 8 tracks on the record; which has sold in excess of a million records worldwide. James also co-wrote half the tracks and produced the entire record The Moon Under Water for Ryan Cabrera.

With his initial mainstream success James went on to produce and write "Promise", "Drive", and "Afraid" off Vanessa Hudgens album V. In 2009 he produced and co-wrote the hit single "Supergirl" for Miley Cyrus off the album Hannah Montana 3, which debuted at number five on Billboard's Bubbling Under Hot 100 Singles Chart. During this time period he also produced and wrote "Masquerade" for Ashley Tisdale off her album Guilty Pleasure. James later went on to produce and co-write 3 tracks off Demi Lovato's album Unbroken as well as "Hit the Lights" for Selena Gomez which is her next single off the album When the Sun Goes Down. From then he has worked with Grammy Award nominated artist Nicki Minaj, co-producing and co-writing the track "Marilyn Monroe". After his continued success, Dreamlab set up the imprint Layer Cake Records with their first signings of Neon Hymns and Hunter Parrish.

== Discography ==
Year	Artist	Album	Details
2005	Aly & AJ	Into the Rush	Producer, Writer ("Rush","In a Second"), Producer ("No One","Collapsed","Out of the Blue","Something More","Protecting Me","I Am One of Them")
2006	Vanessa Hudgens	V	Producer, Writer ("Promise", "Drive","Afraid")
2007	Cheetah Girls	TCG	Producer, Writer ("So Bring It On","Uh-Oh")
2008	Britney Spears	Circus	Vocals ("Out From Under")
2008	Vanessa Hudgens	Identified	Programmer, Arranger ("Did it Ever Cross your Mind","Papercut")
2008	Ryan Cabrera	The Moon Under Water	Producer, Writer ("Say","Relax","Say You Will","In Between Lights","Should've Kissed You"), Producer ("I Will Remember You","Please Don't Lie To Me","How Bout Tonight")
2008	Jordan Pruitt	Permission to Fly	Producer, Writer ("One Love","Simple Things")
2008	Michael Paynter		Producer, Co-writer ("Lay My Armour Down","Let Go")
2009	Selena Gomez & the Scene	Original Motion Picture Hollywood Soundtrack	Producer, Writer ("Magical")
2009	Miley Cyrus	Hannah Montana 3	Producer, Writer ("Supergirl")
2009	Ashley Tisdale	Guilty Pleasure	Producer, Writer ("Masquerade")
2009	Cassie Davis	Differently	Producer, Writer ("Do It Again")
2009	Camera Can't Lie	Days & Days	Producer, Writer ("The One That Got Away")
2009	LoveHateHero	America Underwater	Producer, Co-writer ("America Underwater Album")
2010	The Wanted	The Wanted	Producer, Co-writer ("Say It on The Radio")
2010	Debi Nova		Producer, Writer ("Drummer Boy")
2010	Allison Iraheta	Just Like You	Producer, Writer ("Pieces")
2010	SoundGirl	Something to Dream About	Producer, Co-writer ("Hero")
2010	BC Jean		Producer, Writer ("Shattered","Get All Over Me")
2011	Demi Lovato	Unbroken	Producer, Co-writer ("Unbroken","Mistake","Hold Up")
2011	Selena Gomez & the Scene	'When the Sun Goes Down	Producer, Co-writer ("Hit the Lights")
2011	Girls' Generation	Girls' Generation	Co-writer ("I'm in Love With the Hero","Beautiful Stranger","Born to Be a Lady")
2011	Avery		Producer, Co-writer ("Go Screw Yourself","That Girl","Next Level")
2012	Nicki Minaj	Pink Friday: Roman Reloaded	Co-producer, Co-writer ("Marilyn Monroe")
2012	Bridgit Mendler	Hello My Name Is...	Producer, Co-writer, Mixed ("Blonde")
2013	Selena Gomez	Stars Dance	Producer, Co-writer ("Like A Champion", "Write Your Name", "Music Feels Better", "Lover in Me")
2013	Selena Gomez	Come & Get It	Vocal Producer
2013	Nikki Williams	Glowing	Co-producer, Co-writer
2014	The Veronicas	The Veronicas (album)	Producer, Writer (Cruel, Teenage Millionaire)
