= Takin' Back What's Mine =

2001 single by Leah Haywood

Single by Leah Haywood

from the album Leah
- Released: 16 April 2001
- Length: 3:41
- Label: Epic
- Songwriters: Paul Begaud; Leah Jacqueline Cooney
- Producer: Paul Begaud

Leah Haywood singles chronology
"Crazy" (2000)	"Takin' Back What's Mine" (2001)	"Summer of Love" (2001)

Music video
- "Takin' Back What's Mine" on YouTube

"Takin' Back What's Mine" is the third single released from Australian singer-songwriter Leah Haywood's debut studio album, Leah (2001). It was released nearly six months after her second single, "Crazy", had first charted, while Haywood was still writing and recording for her debut album. The single debuted and peaked at number 18 on the Australian ARIA Singles Chart, staying in the top 50 for eight weeks. A non-album track titled "Anytime" (co-written by Barbara Griffin and Haywood) was included on the single in addition to an alternate recording of an acoustic version of "We Think It's Love".

== Music video ==
The music video for "Takin' Back What's Mine", directed by Mark Hartley, features a girl dressed in black and wearing a black mask entering her ex-boyfriend's house to steal his belongings. Haywood is also featured throughout the video standing on the stairs wearing a black sleeveless top and navy blue jeans and alternating with a white top when she sings on the balcony and on top of the stairs. She is also accompanied with four female dancers dressed in black catsuits and a mask similar to the main girl in the story. Towards the end of the video, there are shots of the girl taking some of the items sung in the song such as "the goldfish" and "the dog" before she gets in a car and drives off with all of the stolen items.

There are two edits to this music video: a censored version and an uncensored version. The censored version uses panning shots of Haywood on top of the stairs during the bridge of the song while the uncensored version showed footage of the girl in the story beating up her ex-boyfriend with karate moves and also spoofing a shot of The Matrix kick. Due to the violent nature of this scene, Video Hits would always air the censored version because of its family friendly time slot while Rage always aired the uncensored version.

== Track listing ==
Australian CD single

1. "Takin' Back What's Mine" – 3:40
2. "Anytime" – 4:07
3. "We Think It's Love" (acoustic) – 3:19

== Charts ==
Weekly chart performance for "Takin' Back What's Mine"
Chart (2001)	Peak position
Australia (ARIA)	18
