= Unbroken (Demi Lovato album) =

2011 studio album by Demi Lovato

- Standard edition cover (Note: The Japan deluxe edition uses the same photograph as "Skyscraper".)

Studio album by Demi Lovato
- Released: September 20, 2011
- Recorded: July 2010 – August 2011
- Studios: Westlake Recording Studios, Dreamlab Studios, Chalice Studios, Strawberrybee Studios, Dining Room Studios and Kite Studios (Los Angeles, California); Patriot Studios (Denver, Colorado); Rock Mafia Studios (Santa Monica, California); Hit Factory Criteria (Miami, Florida); Sunset Sound Studio (Bryn Mawr, Pennsylvania)
- Genres: Pop; R&B
- Length: 52:36
- Label: Hollywood
- Producers: Jim Beanz; Toby Gad; Timbaland; Ryan Tedder; Rock Mafia; Dreamlab; Emanuel Kiriakou; Bleu; Josh Alexander; Billy Steinberg; Dapo

Demi Lovato chronology
Here We Go Again (2009)	Unbroken (2011)	Demi (2013)

Singles from Unbroken
- 1. "Skyscraper" Released: July 12, 2011; 2. "Give Your Heart a Break" Released: January 23, 2012

Unbroken is the third studio album by American singer Demi Lovato. It was released on September 20, 2011, by Hollywood Records. Primarily a pop record, Lovato described the album as "more mature" and with more R&B elements than her previous material, citing Rihanna as the major influence. While some of the album's lyrical content was heavily influenced by Lovato's personal struggles, it also deals with lighter subjects, such as love and self empowerment. Contributions to the album's production came from a wide range of producers, including Toby Gad, Ryan Tedder, Timbaland, Jim Beanz and Rock Mafia.

Lovato initially began recording her third studio album in 2010 before going on tour with the Jonas Brothers on their Live in Concert Tour. After withdrawing from the tour to seek treatment for physical and emotional issues, Lovato continued work on the album and described the recording process as therapeutic. She collaborated with artists such as Missy Elliott, Timbaland, Dev, Iyaz, and Jason Derulo on several tracks. Commercially, Unbroken peaked at number four on the Billboard 200 chart in the United States, with sales exceeding 97,000 copies in its first week of release, and was later certified platinum by the Recording Industry Association of America (RIAA). The album also performed well internationally, peaking in the top 40 in several countries worldwide. It was certified platinum in Brazil, and gold in Chile and the Philippines.

Unbroken received mixed reviews from music critics, with some commending its ballad tracks, empowering message and Lovato's vocals, whereas others criticized its number of "party songs" and found the album to be immature. "Skyscraper" was released the lead single from Unbroken in July 2011, peaking at number ten on the Billboard Hot 100 chart in the United States, making it Lovato's third highest-charting single to date, behind "This Is Me" and her most successful until "Sorry Not Sorry" peaked at number six in 2017. The song was well received by critics, who felt it to be a highlight on the album. "Give Your Heart a Break" was released as the second and final single from Unbroken in January 2012, which peaked at number sixteen in the United States and has since been certified 4× platinum by the RIAA. Lovato promoted the album with several radio and television guest appearances, her second headlining tour A Special Night with Demi Lovato, and the MTV television documentary Demi Lovato: Stay Strong.

== Background and development ==
After the release of her second studio album, Here We Go Again (2009), Lovato was dedicated to her acting career, appearing on the Disney Channel television series Sonny with a Chance and television film Camp Rock 2: The Final Jam. In July 2010, Lovato began working on her third album and recorded the first track with producer Dapo Torimiro. The same month, Lovato said the album was "creating a new sound", it would be "fun. A little more R&B/pop." Later, in conversation with AHN, she quoted Rihanna and Keri Hilson as influences. At the time, Lovato revealed she had not rushed the album, stating: "Every other album I haven’t had time to really take my time and craft it like I really wanted to do because I was finding spare time between a television show, and movies, and touring, and then all over again. I've worked on [the album] for the past year and really gone hard over the past few months, but you can definitely tell that I took my time with this record."

In August 2010, Lovato began touring with the Jonas Brothers on their Jonas Brothers Live in Concert Tour with the cast of Camp Rock 2. That November, Lovato left the tour in order to enter a treatment facility for "emotional and physical issues". She completed inpatient treatment in January 2011 and returned to the recording studio for her third studio album until February. In April 2011, Lovato announced that she would not return to Sonny with a Chance, stating that she was choosing to focus on music and would return to acting when she felt confident doing so. In July, Lovato described the album as "more mature" than her previous sound and more fun and light than her first single, "Skyscraper", while other tracks are more intense. Lovato announced the title of the album as Unbroken in August and explained: "I thought that the title really matched how I am today; I'm unbroken and I'm standing strong."

== Production and recording ==
Lovato recorded Unbroken in sessions at Westlake Recording Studios, Dreamlab Studios, Chalice Studios, Strawberrybee Studios, Dining Room Studios and Kite Studios all located in Los Angeles, California; she also recorded at Patriot Studios in Denver, Colorado, Rock Mafia Studios in Santa Monica, California, The Hit Factory Criteria in Miami, Florida, and Sunset Sound Studio in Bryn Mawr, Pennsylvania. Discussing the album's recording in interview with Seventeen magazine, Lovato stated: "I love being back in the studio! It's been very therapeutic to be able to express my feelings and talk about who I really am, through my music. It also helps that I've been lucky enough to work with such talented people on the record so far! With my new album, I'm hoping to provide inspiration for girls everywhere who are going through the same issues I've faced. I think this will come through in a lot of the material."

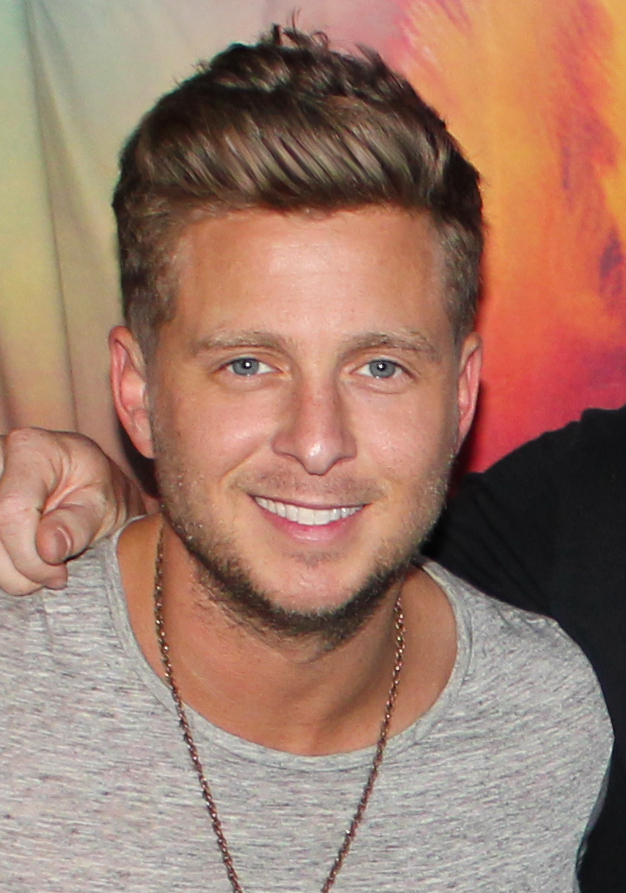
Ryan Tedder produced the track "Who's That Boy" and stated that Lovato was one of the best vocalists he had ever worked with, comparing her vocal ability to that of Kelly Clarkson.

Around 20 tracks were recorded and speaking about the album to E! in July 2011, Lovato said people could expect to hear her sing "about some issues that I've never even spoken about before" and also revealed: "There are some [topics] on there that are very deep and it's really out there. For the rest of it, there are a lot of songs that are dancier and a lot more R&B vocals," one of which she confirmed as a duet with an R&B singer. She also worked with Dreamlab, who produced the title track, "Hold Up" and "Mistake". The songs were recorded at Dreamlab Studios in Los Angeles, California and mixed by Serban Ghenea, with assistance from Phil Seaford, in Virginia Beach, Virginia at MixStar Studios. John Hanes was attributed with engineering for the songs. Lovato also worked with Rock Mafia, Ryan Tedder, and Kara DioGuardi on several tracks. About working with Lovato, Tedder commented: "Demi blew me out of the water vocally! I had no idea how good her voice is. She's one of the best singers I've ever worked with. Literally, that good... I mean, she's a Kelly Clarkson-level vocalist. And Kelly has a set of pipes." He also explained that the song they co-wrote together is much more upbeat than "Skyscraper", stating: "I think everybody wanted to hear her talk about that, and this is basically flipping it 180, saying, 'Oh, by the way, I'm still also just young and want to have fun.' There's even like a little rap feature on it." In sessions with Tedder, Lovato recorded various songs but only one was included on Unbroken, "Who's That Boy". Commenting about the song, Lovato described it as "flirty, it's sexy, it's exciting and I love it."

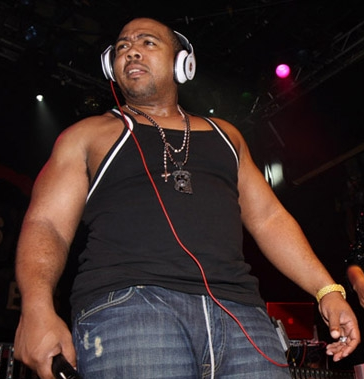
Timbaland produced the tracks "All Night Long", "Together" and "Lightweight", contributing to the album's "urban" sound. He expressed interest in recording with Lovato as he was impressed with her voice.

Record producer Timbaland wanted to record with Lovato after he heard her voice; he felt impressed and curious to work with the singer and began to write songs in an acoustic guitar. Lovato then met Timbaland at his camp where they discussed the album's direction, Lovato stated she wanted created a more "urban" sound. They met each other again at Westlake Recording Studios, where they developed several songs, including "Lightweight" and "All Night Long". The R&B singer Missy Elliott was introduced in the production after listened the sessions for "All Night Long", Elliott asked if she could rap on the song. Lovato agreed saying "Of course, that's not even a question." The singer Jason Derulo was invited to record "Together" while he was in Miami, Florida. In interview with MTV he explained how the collaboration came: "I'm very rarely in Miami and I live in Miami, but before the time I was there, I was there like six months prior and then I haven't been there for a long, long time. But I guess she knew that I lived in Miami. A mutual friend called me and was like, 'Hey, we're at the studio, Demi wanted to get in with you if you were around." Derulo recorded his verses during the middle of the night at The Hit Factory Criteria.

Toby Gad and Lindy Robbins also contributed to the album's co-writing "Skyscraper" with Estonian singer Kerli Kõiv. Initially, Lovato recorded "Skyscraper" in Studio City, Los Angeles in 2010. During recording sessions, Lovato was "doubled over, just in pain." After completing her treatment on January 28, 2011, Lovato re-recorded the song, but decided to keep the original recording because she felt that her voice had changed, although noting that her voice was "weaker" when Lovato originally recorded. Gad also produced "My Love Is Like a Star" and "For the Love of a Daughter", the second song was originally recorded as a pop rock song and intended to appear in Lovato's second album, Here We Go Again, released in 2009. Although not planning to write a personal song, a "really long talk" with Beckett resulted in the song being written. However, Lovato and her management felt that the song's subject would be too much for her young audience. After completing the album's recording, Lovato said: "Making the album was a personal journey for me; it was kind of like a roller coaster, I was going through so much over the past year, but at the end of it I just wanted to inspire people and just give them music to have fun dancing to and listening to, and hopefully I accomplished that."

== Composition ==
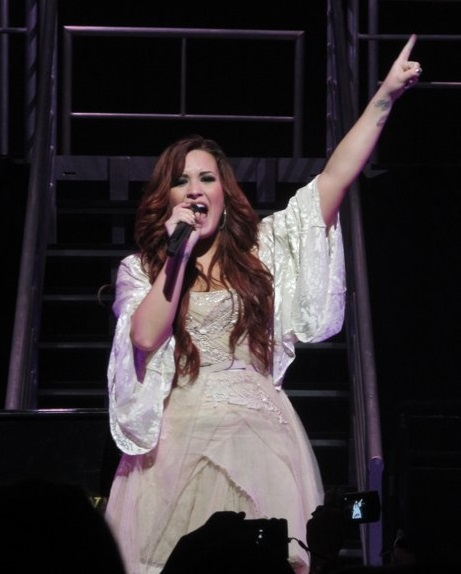
Lovato performing "Together" during A Special Night with Demi Lovato, December 2011.

In terms of music, Unbroken explores uptempo R&B songs and electronic genres in contrast with emotional and personal ballads. Lyrically, the album presents more "mature" themes about relationships in comparison to its predecessors Don't Forget and Here We Go Again, being described as an "evolution" and next chapter in Lovato's career. In interview with Billboard, Lovato explained the variety of sounds present in its production: "Ultimately it's pop, but I have songs that are really dance-like, songs that are more R&B, and songs like 'Skyscraper' that are not really R&B at all. And so it just depends on the song." A great part of the album is set in a 4/4 time signature, however, "Lightweight" and "Fix a Heart" are composed in compound time. The album opens with R&B tracks, each song features appearance from an artist. The opening track "All Night Long" features rapped verses from Missy Elliot. The song incorporates Timbaland's characteristic beats, Lovato sings over a pumping beat, beatbox vocals and guitar riff. Describing the song, Lovato stated: "It's about staying up all night long and singing it to the boy that you like, and it's flirty and fun and it's not too grown-up, but it's grown-up enough." "Who's That Boy" features syncopated groove and synthesizers, the song featuring guest appearance from Dev. "You're My Only Shorty" contain a repetitive chorus sung by Iyaz, the song is backed by synths. The fourth track "Together" is a duet with the singer Jason Derulo, its midtempo R&B song backed by guitar chords, Lyrically, the song delivers an inspirational message about how we can change the world if we come "together".

"All Night Long"
A sample of the song "All Night Long", an uptempo R&B track. The song is an example of the "urban" sound and characteristic beat by music producer Timbaland explored in the album.

The fifth track "Lightweight" is a doo-wop-inspired ballad with a minimal orchestral arrangement. Lyrically, it is the first track to express Lovato's fragility and sensitivity, it can be noted during the chorus where Lovato sings: "I'm a lightweight, easy to fall, easy to break, with every move my world shakes." "Lightweight" has a tempo of 64 beats per minute in compound quadruple (12/8) time. The title track "Unbroken" is an uptempo dance song that runs through a "brittle" beat influenced by electro-industrial music. The composition of the song incorporates influences of disco music from the 1980s. Lovato's vocals are accompanied with a synthesized echo in the song's background. After the second chorus, the song features a breakdown influenced by dubstep. The beat structure has also been compared to Britney Spears’ 2011 single, "Hold It Against Me". It combines heavy electronic beats with numerous synthesizer keyboard effects. Lyrically, "Unbroken" is about letting go and not holding anything back when it comes to love. It was interpreted by Jocelyn Vena of MTV that the lyrics were written about "being saved by love." "Fix a Heart" is a piano-driven ballad that also express an emotional side from the singer. "Hold Up" has an uptempo dance beat and synths effects in its production, the song share similar production to title track, as noted by an editor from Sputnikmusic who described both songs as "fun" and wrote that they "give a new twist (a progress) to her signature pop roots, being a bit edgier." "Mistake" is the album's third ballad. The song is backed by an electric guitar during its chorus and mainly in the bridge. Lovato considered the song was "a different take on a breakup." And said she was "really intrigued by the fact that the girl had just been broken up with and it was the other person’s fault and it was the other person’s greatest mistake."

The tenth track "Give Your Heart a Break" features strings, violins and piano accompanied by a dance beat. Describing the song, Lovato said: "It's a song about showing someone you love that you're the one right in front of them. This is a song about faith." The written Joe DeAndrea of AbsolutePunk praised "Mistake" and "Give Your Heart a Break" as ballads going "far and beyond anything in Lovato's prior arsenal. It sets a mark as to what should be expected from similar artists such as her, but in the process, distancing herself from being grouped with them becoming a solo entity." "Skyscraper" was described the most emotional song in the album, According to Lovato, the song's lyrics symbolize her personal journey from where she used to be to "the happy healthy person she is today." The song deals with the difficulties Lovato had been through in the past year and overcoming the obstacles she faced. With the song, Lovato hopes that "people are able to relate to it and realize that she is able to rise above and overcome any obstacle, no matter the circumstances and shine like a skyscraper". "In Real Life" uses keyboard effects and guitar during the chorus. "My Love Is Like a Star" is a downtempo ballad, John Camaranica from The New York Times wrote that in the song "Lovato appeared to be channeling the soul-excavation of Mary J. Blige." The album concludes with "For the Love of a Daughter", in the song, she pleaded with her father to "put the bottle down" and question him: "How could you push me out of your world, lie to your flesh and your blood, put your hands on the ones that you swore you loved?" Indicative in the lyrics "It's been five years since we've spoken last / And you can't take back what we never had." The song received extreme critical acclaim from music critics, praising heavily on its lyrical content and Lovato's sincerity and vulnerability in her vocals.

== Critical reception ==
Professional ratings
Aggregate scores
Source	Rating
Metacritic	59/100
Review scores
Source	Rating
Absolute Punk	(8.1/10)
AllMusic	2.5/5 stars
Artistdirect	4.5/5 stars
Entertainment Weekly	B+
MusicOMH	3.5/5 stars
The New York Times	(favorable)
PopMatters	(5/10)
Rolling Stone	2/5 stars
Sputnikmusic	3.5/5 stars
USA Today	3/4 stars

Unbroken received mixed reviews from music critics. On review aggregator Metacritic, the album has a score of 59 out of 100 based on seven reviews, indicating "mixed or average reviews". While some music critics praised Lovato's vocals and growth in musicianship compared to her previous two albums, as well as some of the album's ballad tracks, others dismissed it as "immature" and "confusing", referring to the album's number of "party songs". Stephen Thomas Erlewine of AllMusic scored the album two and a half out of five stars, criticizing it as full of party songs that "act like nothing is wrong in her world at all", writing: "It's hard to party knowing Lovato couldn't quite handle the clubs, while it's not easy to trust the melancholy flowing through the ballads knowing she's ready to cut loose." Erlewine indicated "All Night Long", "Who's That Boy", "Fix a Heart", and "Skyscraper" as the AMG track picks. Monica Herrera of Rolling Stone also gave the album a mixed review, scoring it 2 out of 5 stars, saying: "She's grown into her voice. Now, if only her music would grow up too." Mike Schiller writer of PopMatters gave to the album 5 out of possible 10, writing: "Unbroken is a strange beast, an abomination of sorts, a fully-realized album with an extra head and shoulders sticking out of the midsection." He also criticized the first four songs, writing that the album "would be a far better album without them, but like it or not they're there, sitting right out in front. It'd seem tragic if such a descriptor wasn't being used to describe an album so laced with actual, genuine tragedy."

Jon Caramanica of The New York Times gave the album a positive review, saying that it "represents the opportunity for Demi Lovato to wipe clean several slates, something she is well suited for." Melissa Maerz of Entertainment Weekly also gave a positive review, scoring it a B+ and writing: "Clearly it's been a tough year for Lovato. But as Rihanna could tell her, sometimes bad years make great songs." Absolute Punk scored the album 81 out of 100, summarizing it by saying: "Nothing, and nobody, is broken beyond repair, and Unbroken showcases that beautifully." Entertainment Weekly listed Unbroken as the seventh best album of 2011.

In a May 2013 interview with Billboard promoting her subsequent album Demi (2013), Lovato herself expressed mixed feelings about the album, stating:

"I don't know! I got sick of the songs. When I would play them onstage, I was just like, 'Oh my gosh, I can't play these anymore.' And I have to wonder, was that album really who I was? Was I just experimenting with sounds? I think I wanted to try something more R&B, but when I tried that, it wasn't really me. And so with this album [Demi], I'm so excited to play new music rather than getting tired of the songs".

== Commercial performance ==
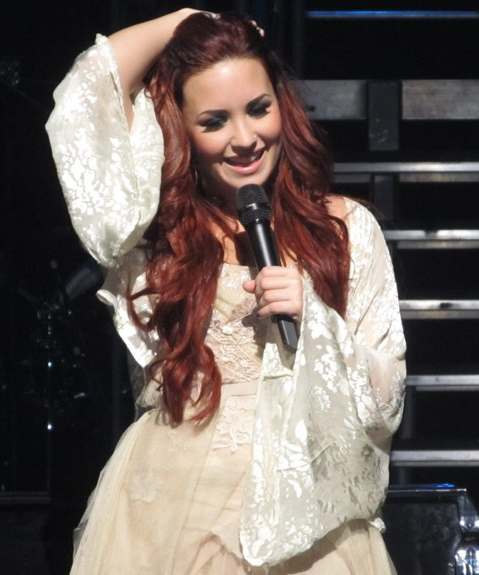
Lovato performing during her concert tour A Special Night with Demi Lovato in December 2011.

Unbroken debuted at number four on the Billboard 200 chart in the United States, with sales exceeding 97,000, becoming her third consecutive top 5 album on chart. It also peaked at number one on the digital albums chart. Elsewhere, the album debuted at number 90 on the Mexican Albums Chart and on its second week on the chart, jumped to its peak of number 9 and spent a total of 8 weeks on the chart. On the Australian Albums Chart, it debuted at number 20, her highest debut and peaking album there. Its highest entry was number 3 in the New Zealand Albums Chart, making it her first top 3 album there. It spent a total of five weeks on the chart all in the top 40.

The album was also Lovato's first to chart on the Belgian Albums Chart (Flanders) chart, debuting at number 59, and jumped to number 25 the following week. Unbroken did not find much success on the Belgian Albums Chart (Wallonia) chart, peaking at number 99. On the Swiss Albums Chart it debuted at number 29, an improvement compared to her last album, however, just managed to make it into the top 50 on the Austrian Albums Chart, debuting and peaking at number 50. On the Spanish Albums Chart, the album debuted at number 24, her second highest peak there, and in her second week fell to number 42, while on the Argentinian Albums Chart granted Lovato another top 10 debut as scored the number 8 spot only to fall off and reappear two weeks later. Unbroken debuted at number 271 on the Japanese Albums Chart, with sales of 444 units in its opening week, also her lowest debut and peaking album there. As of 2017, the album has sold 527,000 copies in the United States.

== Promotion ==
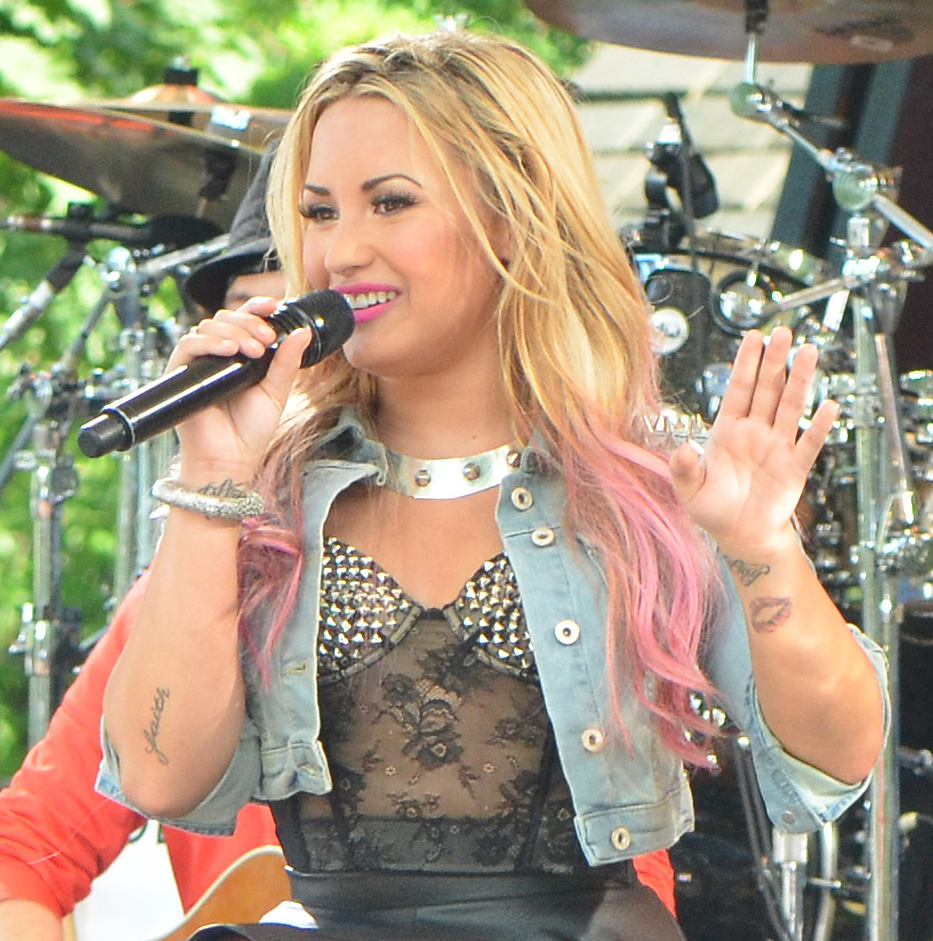
Lovato performing on Good Morning America in July 2012 as part of their Summer Concert Series.

The track "All Night Long" was released on September 14, 2011, and "Who's That Boy" was released in the month following the album. In August 2011, Lovato announced a trio of shows to promote the album, marking her first return to the concert stage since entering treatment the previous year. She performed a pair of shows New York's Manhattan Center Hammerstein Ballroom on September 17 and 18, and at Club Nokia in Los Angeles on September 23. Following the shows and the album's released, Lovato teased tour plans before officially announcing A Special Night with Demi Lovato, her second headlining concert tour. The first North American leg of the tour began on November 16 in Detroit and ended in Tampa, Florida on December 11, 2011.

A Latin American leg began in San Juan, Puerto Rico on December 16, 2011, and concluded in Monterrey, Mexico on May 3, 2012. She performed three shows in Florida and Texas in March 2012 before launching a second North American leg of the tour in June, commencing in Del Mar, California on June 12 and concluding in Salem, Oregon on September 1, 2012. Lovato returned to Latin America for two shows in Brazil on September 29 and 30, 2012 before launching short-lived Asian and European legs of the tour in March 2013, performing five shows that month across the continents. Her journey through going on tour for the first time since she withdrew from her last tour to seek treatment was chronicled on the MTV television documentary special Demi Lovato: Stay Strong, which aired in March 2012 and showed exclusive behind-the-scenes footage from the tour and dealt with Lovato's treatment and recovery (she admitted years later to being dishonest about her recovery in the film, revealing she was in fact under the influence of cocaine while being interviewed about her sobriety).

With the tour announcement, Lovato expressed excitement to launch the project and commented about the difference between tour and her promotional shows: "We're gonna do the same show, but a little bit different... better and bigger, and my fans just have to come check it out." She said in conversation with MTV News, "We were just experimenting with the show and trying to see how it all played out and give my fans something that will bait them in for the tour." Lovato also appeared on Z100's annual Jingle Ball with various artists.

== Singles ==
"Skyscraper" was released as the lead single from Unbroken on July 12, 2011. The song was written by Toby Gad, Lindy Robbins and Estonian singer Kerli Kõiv and produced by Gad. The song peaked at number ten on the Billboard Hot 100 chart in the United States. Elsewhere, the song peaked at number 18 in Canada, number 9 in New Zealand, number 45 in Australia and at number 7 in the United Kingdom. The song was critically acclaimed by music critics, some of them praising Lovato's vocals and the inspirational lyrics. Lovato performed the song several times, including on the television series America's Got Talent, The Ellen DeGeneres Show and Dancing with the Stars. The song was officially certified platinum in the United States in April 2012.

"Give Your Heart a Break" was released as the album's second and final single on January 23, 2012. It was originally announced that the album's second single would be "Who's That Boy" featuring Dev, but it was later scrapped due to Dev's pregnancy. "Give Your Heart a Break" was written and produced by Josh Alexander and Billy Steinberg. Lovato performed the song at MTV's New Year's Eve on December 31, 2011, and the People's Choice Awards on January 12, 2012. The song received critical acclaim by music critics, praising the production of the song as well as Lovato's vocals. Lovato also performed the single on American Idol on March 15, 2012. The song peaked at number 16 on the Billboard Hot 100 and reached number one on Billboard's Pop chart in September 2012. It was also certified triple platinum in the United States.

== Track listing ==
Standard edition
No.	Title	Writer(s)	Producer(s)	Length
1.	"All Night Long" (featuring Missy Elliott and Timbaland)	Demi Lovato; Timothy Mosley; Jim Beanz; Jerome "Jroc" Harmon; Melissa Elliott; Lyrica Anderson; Erin Reed; Garland Mosley; Joseph Angel	Timbaland; Harmon^{[a]}; Beanz^{[c]}	3:14
2.	"Who's That Boy" (featuring Dev)	Ryan Tedder; Noel Zancanella; Devin Tailes	Tedder; Zancanella	3:12
3.	"You're My Only Shorty" (featuring Iyaz)	Antonina Armato; Tim James	Rock Mafia; Devrim Karaoglu^{[b]}; Thomas Armato Sturges^{[b]}	3:06
4.	"Together" (featuring Jason Derulo)	Lovato; T. Mosley; Beanz; Anderson; Tiyon Mack; G. Mosley	Beanz; Timbaland	4:33
5.	"Lightweight"	T. Mosley; Beanz; G. Mosley; Shanna Crooks; Frankie Storm	Beanz; Timbaland	4:01
6.	"Unbroken"	Lovato; Daniel James; Leah Haywood	Dreamlab	3:18
7.	"Fix a Heart"	Emanuel Kiriakou; Priscilla Renea	Kiriakou	3:13
8.	"Hold Up"	Lovato; James; Haywood; Ross Golan	Dreamlab	2:50
9.	"Mistake"	James; Haywood; Shelly Peiken	Dreamlab	3:33
10.	"Give Your Heart a Break"	Josh Alexander; Billy Steinberg	Alexander; Steinberg	3:25
11.	"Skyscraper"	Toby Gad; Lindy Robbins; Kerli Koiv	Gad	3:42
12.	"In Real Life"	William McAuley III; Lindsey Ray	Bleu	2:57
13.	"My Love Is Like a Star"	Gad; James Morrison	Gad	3:50
14.	"For the Love of a Daughter"	Lovato; William Beckett	Gad	4:00
15.	"Skyscraper" (Wizz Dumb Remix)	Gad; Robbins; Koiv	Gad	3:42
Total length:				52:36

Japanese deluxe edition
No.	Title	Writer(s)	Producer(s)	Length
16.	"Rascacielo" (Spanish version of "Skyscraper")	Gad; Robbins; Koiv	Edgar Cortázar	3:43
17.	"Aftershock"	Amy Pearson; Haywood; James	Dreamlab	3:11
18.	"Yes I Am"	Dapo Torimiro; Renea	Dapo	3:01
Total length:				62:31

Notes

- ^{^[a]} signifies a co-producer
- ^{^[b]} signifies an additional producer
- ^{^[c]} signifies a vocal producer
- International iTunes Store deluxe edition includes the videos from Hershey Concert performances of "Unbroken" and "Fix a Heart", as well as a track by track interview with Lovato.
- Latin American edition includes "Rascacielo" as the sole bonus track.
- Japanese deluxe edition comes with a DVD which features the music video and behind the scenes footage of "Skyscraper" and a track by track interview with Lovato.
- The 2021 vinyl release of the album omits the Wizz Dumb Remix of "Skyscraper".

== Personnel ==
Credits adapted from the liner notes of Unbroken.

Performers and musicians

- Demi Lovato – lead vocals, background vocals
- Missy Elliott – featured artist (track 1)
- Timbaland – featured artist (track 1)
- Dev – featured artist (track 2)
- Iyaz – featured artist (track 3)
- Jason Derulo – featured artist (track 4)
- Josh Alexander – all instruments (track 10)
- Bleu – keyboards (track 12), guitar (track 12)
- Eren Cannata – guitar (track 4)
- Jim Beanz – additional vocals (tracks 1, 4)
- Toby Gad – all instruments (track 11, 13–14)
- Emanuel Kiriakou – piano (track 7), keyboards (track 7), bass (track 7)
- Jaden Michaels – additional background vocals (track 10)
- Lindsey Ray – background vocals (track 12)
- Jordin Sparks – additional background vocals (track 11)
- Ryan Tedder – all instruments (track 2)
- Noel Zancanella – all instruments (track 2)

Production

- Josh Alexander – production (track 10), recording (track 10), engineering (track 10), mixing (track 10), programming (track 10)
- Bleu – production (track 12), recording (track 12), mixing (track 12), programming (track 12)
- Brian Byrd – production coordination (tracks 1, 4–5)
- Bobby Campbell – engineering (track 2)
- Ducky Carlisle – mixing (track 12)
- Smith Carlson – engineering (track 2)
- Adam Comstock – engineering (track 3)
- Alexander "Fade" Dilliplane – assistant engineer (tracks 1, 4–5)
- Dreamlab – production (tracks 6, 8–9)
- Mike "Daddy" Evans – executive production coordination (tracks 1, 4–5)
- Toby Gad – production (tracks 11, 13–15), mixing (tracks 11, 13–15), programming (tracks 11, 13–14)
- Elizabeth "Lizzy Gaga" Gallardo – assistant engineer (tracks 1, 4–5)
- Chris Garcia – recording (track 10), engineering (track 10)
- Serban Ghenea – mixing (tracks 2, 6–7)
- Chris Godbey – mixing (tracks 1, 4–5)
- Steve Hammons – engineering (track 3), mixing engineer (track 3)
- John Hanes – engineered for mix
- Jerome "J-Roc" Harmon – co-production (track 1)
- Tim James – mixing (track 3), digital editing (track 3)
- Jim Beanz – production (tracks 4–5), vocal production (tracks 1, 4–5)
- Devrim Karaoglu – additional production (track 3)
- Emanuel Kiriakou – production (track 7), programming (track 7)
- Jens Koerkemeier – engineering (track 7), editing (track 7)
- Koil – recording (track 4)
- Steve Lu – string arrangement (track 5)
- Nigel Lundemo – digital editing (track 3)
- Garland Mosley – executive production coordination (tracks 1, 4–5)
- Jeremiah "J-Hop" Olvera – assistant mixer (tracks 8–9)
- Paul Palmer – mixing (track 3)
- Neal Pogue – mixing (tracks 8–9)
- Tucker Robinson – assistant engineer (track 2)
- Rock Mafia – production (track 3)
- Scott Roewe – Logic and Pro Tools tech (track 10)
- Phil Seaford – assistant mixer (tracks 2, 6–7)
- Billy Steinberg – production (track 10)
- Thomas Armato Sturges – additional production (track 3)
- Ryan Tedder – production (track 2), engineering (track 2)
- Timbaland – production (tracks 1, 4–5)
- Julian Vasquez – recording (tracks 1, 4–5)
- Robert Vosgien – mastering
- Wizz Dumb – beats (track 15)
- Noel Zancanella – production (track 2)

Design and management

- Eddie De La Garza – management
- Enny Joo – art direction, design
- Jon Lind – A&R
- Philip McIntyre – management
- David Snow – creative direction
- Hilary Walsh – photography
- Cindy Warden – A&R coordination

== Charts ==
=== Weekly charts ===
Weekly chart performance for Unbroken
Chart (2011–2012)	Peak position
Australian Albums (ARIA)	20
Argentinian Albums (CAPIF)	8
Austrian Albums (Ö3 Austria)	50
Belgian Albums (Ultratop Flanders)	25
Belgian Albums (Ultratop Wallonia)	99
Canadian Albums (Billboard)	4
Dutch Albums (Album Top 100)	63
German Albums (Offizielle Top 100)	61
Irish Albums (IRMA)	44
Italian Albums (FIMI)	22
Japanese Albums (Oricon)	271
Mexican Albums (Top 100 Mexico)	9
New Zealand Albums (RMNZ)	3
Polish Albums (ZPAV)	68
Scottish Albums (Official Charts)	46
Spanish Albums (Promusicae)	24
Swiss Albums (Schweizer Hitparade)	29
UK Albums (Official Charts)	45
Uruguayan Albums CUD	12
US Billboard 200	4

=== Year-end charts ===
Year-end chart performance for Unbroken
Chart (2011)	Position
US Billboard 200	187
Chart (2012)	Position
Brazilian Albums (Pro-Música Brasil)	71
US Billboard 200	149

== Certifications ==
Certifications and sales for Unbroken
Region	Certification	Certified units/sales
Brazil (Pro-Música Brasil)	Gold	20,000^{*}
Chile	Gold	
New Zealand (RMNZ)	Platinum	15,000^{‡}
Philippines (PARI)	Gold	7,500^{*}
United States (RIAA)	Platinum	1,000,000
^{*} Sales figures based on certification alone.^{‡} Sales+streaming figures based on certification alone.

== Release history ==
List of release dates, formats, label, editions and reference
Region	Date	Format(s)	Label	Edition(s)	Ref.
United States	September 20, 2011	CD; digital download	Hollywood	Standard	
Brazil	October 11, 2011	CD	Hollywood	Standard	
Japan	March 21, 2012	CD; digital download	Hollywood	Japan deluxe	
United Kingdom	March 30, 2012	CD; digital download	Hollywood	Standard, iTunes Deluxe	
Various	February 24, 2021	Vinyl	Hollywood	Standard	
