= Like It Loud =

- CD single

Single by Cassie Davis

from the album Differently
- A-side: "Like It Loud"
- B-side: "Boys Don't Cry"
- Released: 22 January 2009 (Download); 23 January 2009 (CD)
- Genre: Power pop, pop rock
- Length: 3:04
- Label: Sony BMG
- Songwriter: Cassie Davis

Cassie Davis singles chronology
"Like It Loud" (2009)	"Differently" (2009)

"Like It Loud" is the debut single by Australian singer Cassie Davis, taken from her debut album Differently. It was released on 22 January 2009 on the iTunes Store, and 23 January 2009 as a CD single. The B side is a cover of The Cure's classic "Boys Don't Cry".

The music video can be viewed on Cassie Davis' official website, together with the music video for the single's B-side, "Boys Don't Cry". Davis made her first live television debut on the second elimination show of season 2 on reality TV series So You Think You Can Dance Australia performing "Like It Loud".

== Musical composition ==
Cassie spoke to The Harbour Agency about the song:

"The song is such a fusion", "It’s urban in the verses and then the chorus rocks out a bit. There are even some punk bits in the bridge too. "Like many of my other songs, I started this one in my studio and I wasn’t thinking about genre or a song to match the others. It was just what I was feeling at the time so there are a lot of different vibes in it but you can still sing along".

== Music video ==
Cassie Davis in the official music video for her debut single, "Like It Loud"

The music video was shot at Fox Studios Australia in Sydney Australia.
It premiered on the 2day Fm website on 16 January 2009.
Cassie Davis uploaded it to her official YouTube channel on 21 January 2009.

According to Davis, it takes place at an illegal underground party held at a construction site. It starts off with someone typing in "www.ilikeitloud.com" on a laptop computer then it cuts to both Davis with her lips changing from one colour to another and another female with an I like it loud badge placed on her tongue. There are many scenes in which Cassie and her dancers perform to energetic choreography. Gymnastics is also used in one part of the video. There is also other scenes in which Cassie performs with her band and on her own in the middle of the construction site.
It is now available for purchase on the Australian iTunes Store.

== Track listing ==
Australian CD single

1. "Like It Loud"
2. "Boys Don't Cry" (M. Dempsey, R. Smith, L. Tolhurst)
3. "Like It Loud" (Boy Printz Remix)
4. "Like It Loud" (A Capella mix)

== Charts ==
The song peaked at #5 on the Australian iTunes top 100 and peaked at #11 on the Australian ARIA charts.

Chart (2009)	Peak position
Australian ARIA Singles Chart	11

=== End of Year Charts ===
Year	Chart	Rank
2009	Australian ARIA End of year Chart	#99

=== Certifications ===
Country	Certification	Sales
Australia	Gold	35,000+

== Release history ==
Country	Release date	Format	Label	Catalogue
Australia	24 January 2009	CD single, download	Sony BMG	88697444512
