= Marilyn Monroe (Nicki Minaj song) =

2012 song by Nicki Minaj

Song by Nicki Minaj

from the album Pink Friday: Roman Reloaded
- Recorded: 2011
- Studio: Conway Studios; Beluga Heights Studio (Los Angeles, California)
- Genre: Pop
- Length: 3:21
- Label: Young Money; Cash Money; Republic
- Songwriters: Onika Maraj; Daniel James; Leah Haywood; Ross Golan; J.R. Rotem
- Producers: J.R. Rotem; Dreamlab

Audio video
- "Marilyn Monroe" on YouTube

"Marilyn Monroe" is a 2012 song by rapper Nicki Minaj. The song was written by Minaj, Daniel James, Leah Haywood, Ross Golan and J.R. Rotem, while production was handled by J.R. Rotem and Dreamlab. Musically, "Marilyn Monroe" is an introspective mid-tempo ballad that contains an upbeat piano, synth beats, and features influences of bubblegum pop. Lyrically, the song alludes to oneself questioning the status of their relationship. The song makes frequent references to pop icon Marilyn Monroe, with many of her quotes woven into the song.

"Marilyn Monroe" was generally well received by music critics, with some noting its crossover potential, while others felt like the song was too similar to other artists. The song has received comparisons to the 2011 singles "Disaster" by JoJo and "Stuttering" by Fefe Dobson, as well as Minaj's own 2010 single "Your Love" from her debut album Pink Friday. The album's high digital sales led "Marilyn Monroe" to chart on the UK Singles Chart and US Billboard charts, charting as high as number 4 on the US Bubbling Under Hot 100 charts.

== Production and composition ==
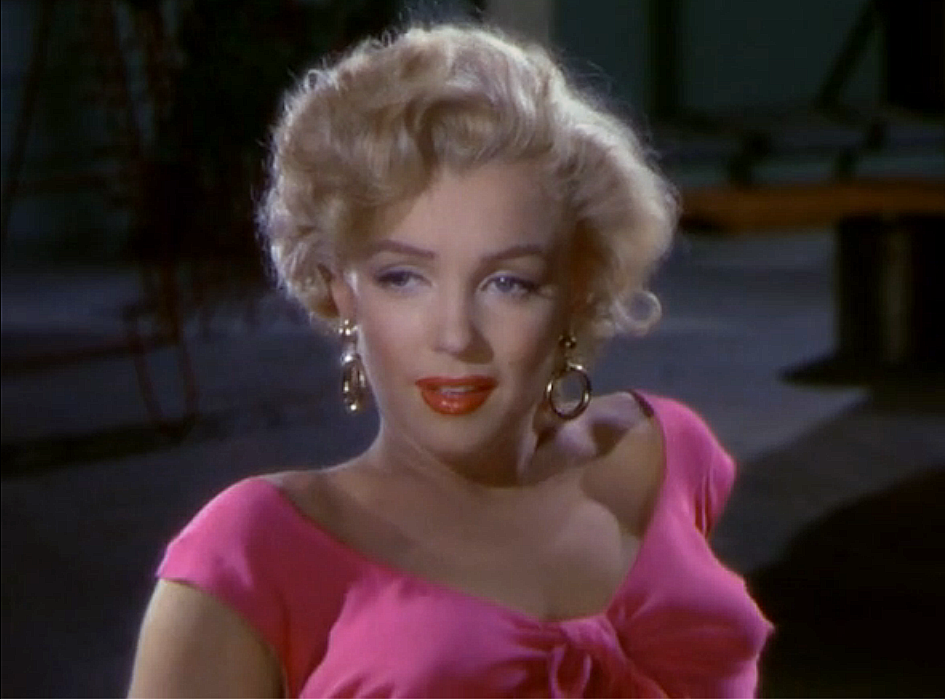
Marilyn Monroe (pictured) is the main inspiration behind the song.

Following the success of Minaj's debut album, Pink Friday, Cash Money co-CEO, Brian "Birdman" Williams announced to Billboard that Minaj was aiming for a first quarter release in 2012. In November 2011, Minaj announced on Twitter that the album would be released on February 14, 2012, though it was later delayed to April 3, 2012. The album focuses on Roman Zolanski, one of Minaj's alter egos that was first featured on Pink Friday.

J.R. Rotem, who previously produced a track for Minaj's debut album, originally conceived "Marilyn Monroe". According to Minaj, "He hit me up and he said, 'I have a song that I think only an icon can sing'. I was like, 'Oh J.R., shut up!' We laughed a little bit on iChat." It was written by Minaj, Daniel James, Leah Haywood, Ross Golan and Rotem. Rotem and Dreamlab produced the track, with vocal production handled by Nicholas Cooper. Ariel Chobaz & Gelly Kusuma recorded and mixed "Marilyn Monroe" with assistance from Jon Sher at Conway Studios and Beluga Heights Studio, both studios in Los Angeles.

Musically, "Marilyn Monroe" is an introspective mid-tempo ballad that contains an upbeat piano, synth beats, and features influences of bubblegum pop. The song is written in the key of E minor with a moderate pop tempo of 84 beats per minute. It follows the chord progression Em−C2 (no 3)−G−D, and Minaj's vocals span two octaves from G_{3} to D_{5}.

Celebrity Marilyn Monroe is mentioned numerous times throughout the song, including the quote "I'm selfish, impatient and a little insecure. I make mistakes, I am out of control and at times hard to handle. But if you can't handle me at my worst, then you sure as hell don't deserve me at my best.” No proof of Marilyn Monroe ever saying this has been found. " Minaj liked the track, as "it spoke to me as a woman. I'm very infatuated with Marilyn Monroe. I had a moment with that song where I was like, 'Oh my God, every woman in this world needs to hear that'. No, we're not perfect. Sometimes, we think, 'What's wrong with us?' We spend so much time criticizing ourselves. I needed to hear that, 'I'm not perfect, but I'm worth it'. It resonated with me. I felt like the world needed to hear it."

== Release and reception ==
"Marilyn Monroe" was first leaked in February 2012. On May 24, 2012, a poll was posted on Minaj's official website asking fans to choose the next single(s). The poll was divided into three categories: The first category asked fans to choose between "Marilyn Monroe", "Fire Burns", "Young Forever", and "Gun Shot". "Marilyn Monroe" had the most votes and won the poll; "Young Forever" came in second, "Fire Burns" came in third, and "Gun Shot" came in fourth. When asked whether "Marilyn Monroe" would become a single during an interview with The Guardian, Minaj replied: "It has to be. It will be. We wanted to do it now, but then UK radio started playing 'Va Va Voom'. We're definitely going to have 'Marilyn Monroe' top of [2013], and we're going to spend quality time on the video. We're going to take care of that one."

"Marilyn Monroe" received mostly positive reviews. Andrew Hampp of Billboard gave the song a positive review, but felt the song was too similar to the JoJo song "Disaster", adding that "Of the three mid-tempo pop cuts on the album, 'Marilyn Monroe' stands the best chance of pop crossover." Andy Gill of The Independent called it one of the most impressive songs on the pop half of the album and also encouraged fans to download it. BBC's Al Fox gave the song a positive review, praising "Young Forever" and "Marilyn Monroe" for displaying the same "tender vulnerabilities" of Minaj's breakthrough anthem "Your Love", saying that it is "a necessary and successful respite in an album so boastful". Slant Magazine negatively compared "Marilyn Monroe" to the works of pop star Demi Lovato.

== Live performances ==
Minaj performed the song on select dates of her debut concert tour, the Pink Friday Tour. She also added the song to her set list for her Pink Friday: Reloaded Tour.

== Personnel ==
Locations

- Recorded at Conway Studios, Los Angeles, CA, and Beluga Heights Studio, Los Angeles, CA
- Mixed at Conway Studios, Los Angeles, CA

Credits

- Writers: O. Maraj, D. James, L. Haywood, R. Golan, J. Rotem
- Producers: J.R. Rotem
- Co-producers: Dreamlab
- Recorded by: Ariel Chobaz & Gelly Kusuma
- Recording Assistant: Jon Sher
- Mixed by: Ariel Chobaz
- Mix Assistant: Jon Sher
- Vocal production by: Nicholas Cooper

== Chart performance ==
Chart (2012)	Peak position
UK Singles (Official Charts Company)	121
US Bubbling Under Hot 100 Singles (Billboard)	19
US R&B/Hip-Hop Songs (Billboard)	4
