= Livewire (radio station) =

Livewire 1350
- Norwich; England

Programming
- Language: English
- Format: Music, news and local entertainment

Ownership
- Owner: Union of UEA Students

History
- First air date: 1990
- Former frequencies: 1350 kHz

Links
- Website: www.livewire1350.co.uk

Livewire 1350 (more commonly referred to as simply Livewire) is a student radio station run by students of the University of East Anglia in Norwich, Norfolk. The station is part of the UEA Media Collective, which consists of Concrete (student newspaper) and UEA:TV.

== History ==
Livewire began broadcasting in 1990, making it one of the longest-running student radio stations in the UK. It was launched by John Peel, but founded by Stephen Howard.

In 2016, the station was rebranded with a new logo and website.

In 2023, Livewire and Nik Richard released "Spread The Joy", a charity christmas single, with vocals provided by members of the station. All proceeds were given to the charity Nourishing Norfolk.

In 2025, former station manager turned BBC Radio 1 DJ Greg James visited the station while touring his book All The Best for the Future, and was interviewed by station manager Nathan Winterford and deputy station manager Autumn Gowers.

== Structure ==
Livewire broadcasts online from 08:00–23:00 on weekdays, 9:00-23:00 on Saturdays, and 12:00–19:00 on Sundays.

== Committee ==
	2022/23	2023/24	2024/25	2025/26	2026/27
Station Manager	Lauren Aarons	George Cooke	Harrison Cable	Nathan Winterford	Edie Davies & Nathan Winterford
Deputy Station Manager	Izzy Millen	Libby Corrie	Lucy Potter	Autumn Gowers	Moe Jennings
Treasurer	Abbie Thorne	Abbie Thorne	Edie Davies	Martha Turner	Martha Turner
First Year Rep	Lucy Potter	Edie Davies	Moe Jennings	George Hill	Barney Ridgway

== Notable alumni ==
- Greg James - BBC Radio 1 DJ
- Jay Lawrence - Absolute Radio DJ
- Issy Panayis - Radio X DJ
