= Crazy (Leah Haywood song) =

2000 song by Leah Haywood

Single by Leah Haywood

from the album Leah
- B-side: "Do You Know"
- Released: 14 August 2000
- Studio: C&J (Copenhagen, Denmark)
- Length: 3:07
- Label: Epic
- Songwriters: Leah Haywood, Andreas Carlsson
- Producer: Cutfather & Joe

Leah Haywood singles chronology
"We Think It's Love" (1999)	"Crazy" (2000)	"Takin' Back What's Mine" (2001)

"Crazy" is a song by Australian singer-songwriter Leah Haywood, released as the second single from her debut album, Leah (2000), in August 2000. Haywood co-wrote the song with Andreas Carlsson. "Crazy" became a top-40 hit on the Australian ARIA Singles Chart, debuting and peaking at number 31.

== Release ==
The single release for "Crazy" contains a B-side track titled "Do You Know" that did not appear on the album, which was also co-written by Leah Haywood and Sydney music producer Barbara Griffin. Both had worked together previously on the track "...And If I Could", which appeared as a B-side on the CD single of "We Think It's Love". The release of this single came with a set of bonus stickers of Haywood as well as an enhanced component featuring the "Crazy" music video and a link to her official website and record company-related sites.

== Music video ==
The music video for "Crazy" was directed by Mark Hartley showing Haywood in various colourful room settings and being accompanied with six female dancers throughout the video. These various settings include Haywood in a room full of feathers, pink room full of trophies and a blue room with white lights outlining the shape of her body.

== Track listing ==
Australian CD single

1. "Crazy" – 3:07
2. "Crazy" (Delicious radio mix) – 3:23
3. "We Think It's Love" (Tracy radio mix) – 3:18
4. "We Think It's Love" (acoustic) – 3:24
5. "Do You Know" – 3:56
6. "Crazy" (video)
7. Weblink

== Charts ==
Chart (2000)	Peak position
Australia (ARIA)	31
