= Do It Again (Cassie Davis song) =

Single by Cassie Davis

from the album Differently
- Released: 7 August 2009
- Recorded: 2009
- Genre: Pop rock
- Length: 2:53
- Label: Sony BMG
- Songwriter(s): Leah Haywood and Daniel James

Cassie Davis singles chronology
"Differently" (2009)	"Do It Again" (2009)	"No More" (2009)

"Do It Again" is the third single from Australian singer Cassie Davis' debut album Differently. The song was co written and produced by LA based Dreamlab songwriter/producer duo, Leah Haywood (former Sony Music Australian artist) and Daniel James.

The video for "Do It Again" was shot on location in Sydney at Fox Studio 1, directed by Toby Angwin and shot by Simon Ozolins (Empire of the Sun).

The song was the #1 most added track to the radio in its debut week of release.

== Release ==
The single was released physically and digitally on 7 August 2009. It officially began radio airplay on 10 July 2009.

== Track listing ==
#	"Do It Again"	Time
1.	"Do It Again"	2:52
2.	"Differently" (Beets & Produce Big Mix)	5:18

The iTunes digital EP includes an additional remix; "Differently" (El Cubano Remix). Another remix, titled "Differently" (O'Lucky Remix), is available for purchase on Cassie Davis' official 'bandit' page.

== Charts ==
=== Weekly charts ===
Chart (2009)	Peak position
Australian Singles Chart	24

=== Year-end charts ===
Chart (2009)	Position
Australian Artists Singles 2009	#31
