= No More (Cassie Davis song) =

Song by the Australian pop rock singer Cassie Davis

Single by Cassie Davis

from the album Differently
- Released: 20 November 2009
- Recorded: Melbourne, 2009
- Genre: Pop rock; power pop
- Length: 3:42
- Label: 12 Stones; Sony
- Songwriters: Wayne Wilkins, Nina Woodford
- Producer: Cassie Davis

Cassie Davis singles chronology
"Do It Again" (2009)	"No More" (2009)	"Don't Wanna Dance" (2010)

"No More" is a song by the Australian pop rock singer Cassie Davis, released to Australian radio 28 September 2009 as the fourth single from her first album, Differently. The single was released digitally and physically on 20 November 2009.

"No More" is written by Wayne Wilkins and Nina Woodford and produced by Davis.

This is the only song (on the album) I didn't write but the moment I heard it I fell in love with it. Wayne Wilkins wrote it and when I heard it, I just had to have it. The melody in the chorus grabbed me immediately, it's stunning and beautiful. I produced it the way I heard the song and the demo was very different. It has big electric guitars now and a driving bass line. I didn't change the lyrics because I loved them - and could totally relate to them.

— Cassie Davis

The music video, directed by Toby Angwin, was shot in Melbourne and stars Nacho Pop from So You Think You Can Dance. The video also shows members from Davis' live band, including her brother Joseph Davis on guitar, David Okulicz on bass guitar and Mitch Bruzzese on drums.

== Track listing ==
CD single

1. "No More" - 3:38
2. "Do It Again" (Acoustic) - 2:08
3. "Differently" (O'Lucky Remix) - 4:18

The iTunes Australia digital EP includes a bonus track, "No More" (Tom Piper & Snob Scrilla's Radio Edit) - 3:58.

== Music video ==
The music video for "No More" stars Cassie Davis, her band and Nacho Pop from So You Think You Can Dance. It was shot in Melbourne, Australia, and directed by Toby Angwin. It begins with the band setting up for performance. Davis wears a white, patterned T-shirt and short faded jeans. Her hair is out and in loose curls. Her make-up is similar to that in "Do It Again". The shot moves to her in a black shirt and torn jeans opening her apartment door to her boyfriend, who is wearing an orange jumper. They enter the living room and sit on the sofa and talk. Days go by, and a wall fills with photographs. She is then seen singing with the band again for the chorus. At the end, more photographs are added to the wall. The shot goes back to the apartment, where she is sitting on the floor wearing black pants and a grey jumper, looking at her phone longingly. Her boyfriend walks in with a mug of tea. She reaches up happily, thinking he brought it for her, but he passes her, sitting on the couch watching TV and drinking the tea. The video for "Do It Again" it on the television. She looks dejected and confused. The shot goes back to the band.

A calendar shows that it is Valentine's Day. Cassie walk around in a small, black dress, impatiently waiting with phone in hand. She then runs to the door, where her boyfriend stands looking casual, and asking why she is so dressed up. They have an argument and she cries. The boyfriend walks out, leaving behind a crumpled paper heart. The shot then reverts to the band for the chorus.

Cassie is seen sitting on the couch wearing her band outfit, and days go by. Her boyfriend enters and they continue to argue. He dismisses her and walks away. She sits down and cries. She is seen with the band again. The shots reverts to her on the couch in the grey jumper, looking at photographs of the boyfriend. She closes her phone, which has a picture of him on the background. The shot then goes back to the band. Her phone rings: it is her boyfriend. He watches her through the window. She picks up the phone, looking at it, then hanging up. The closing shot is of her in profile, standing at the microphone where she sang with the band.

== Charts ==
Chart (2009)	Peak position
Australian ARIA Singles Chart	90
