= Coconut Juice (song) =

Single by Tyga featuring Travis McCoy

from the album No Introduction
- Released: March 22, 2008
- Genre: Pop-rap
- Length: 3:29
- Label: Decaydance; BatSquad
- Songwriters: Michael Stevenson; Travis McCoy
- Producer: S*A*M & Sluggo

Tyga singles chronology
"Coconut Juice" (2008)	"BedRock" (2009)

Travis McCoy singles chronology
"Daylight" (2008)	"Coconut Juice" (2008)	"Differently" (2009)

"Coconut Juice" is a song by American rapper Tyga featuring American singer and rapper Travis McCoy of Gym Class Heroes. It was released on March 22, 2008, by Decaydance Records and BatSquad as the lead single from Tyga's debut studio album, No Introduction (2008). The song was produced by S*A*M & Sluggo and features additional production from Martin Johnson. It contains an interpolation of "Coconut" by Harry Nilsson.

The song peaked at number 94 on the Billboard Hot 100 and number 64 on the Pop 100. A remix featuring Lil Wayne and Rich Boy was released later in 2008.

== Composition and background ==
"Coconut Juice" is a pop-rap song produced by S*A*M & Sluggo. The production was described by DJBooth as a "calypso-rock beat" and features pounding drums, handclaps and synths. The chorus of the song is based on an interpolation of "Coconut" by Harry Nilsson.

The lyrics revolve around a fictional drink called "coconut juice", which Tyga presents as an alternative to alcohol while partying. In an interview, Tyga explained that he did not drink alcohol in clubs and had invented the drink as the central concept of the song. The chorus uses a recurring reference to putting "the lime in the coconut", taken from Nilsson's song, while the verses describe Tyga's experiences at a nightclub and encourage listeners to dance and participate in the song's call-and-response sections. Travie McCoy appears during the song's breakdown.

== Music video ==
The music video for "Coconut Juice" was directed by Dale "Rage" Resteghini. It features appearances from Pete Wentz and Lil Wayne. The video follows Tyga and McCoy in a party setting.

== Remix ==
The official remix features additional verses from Lil Wayne and Rich Boy and uses a slightly altered instrumental. Tyga performs a new verse on the remix, which was produced by Jon Famous.

== Commercial performance ==
"Coconut Juice" debuted on the Billboard Hot 100 in 2008 and peaked at number 94. It also reached number 64 on the Pop 100.

The song became Tyga's first charting single and his first significant commercial success.

== Charts ==
Chart (2008)	Peak Position
US Billboard Hot 100	94

== Release history ==
Release dates and formats for "Coconut Juice"
Region	Date	Format	Label(s)	Ref.
United States	May 6, 2008	Rhythmic airplay	Decaydance	
United States	May 20, 2008	Mainstream airplay	Decaydance	
