= Leah (album) =

Studio album by Leah Haywood
- Released: 23 July 2001
- Recorded: 2000–2001
- Genre: Pop
- Length: 43:24
- Label: Sony Music Entertainment
- Producer: Paul Begaud; David Kreuger; Ulf Lindstrom; Johan Ekhe

Leah is the debut album by Australian pop singer Leah Haywood. It was released on 23 July 2001. Originally, it was meant to be titled after one of the tracks, "My Own Thing", but was changed close to the release date. A track, "One Word", was used on the second Australian soundtrack release of the American TV show Dawson's Creek. Leah peaked at No. 40 on the ARIA Albums Chart. All of the tracks, except "Take a Chance" (which was solely written by Haywood herself), were co-written by Haywood and other songwriters and producers including Paul Begaud and Jorgen Eloffson.

The run times for the tracks "Just to Make You", "One Word", "Missing You" and "Take a Chance" are slightly below what is printed in the track listing. Particularly the track "Just to Make You" runs only for 3 minutes and 40 seconds instead 4 minutes and 10 seconds as stated in the list. Despite "Takin Back What's Mine" being listed as the "album version", there is no difference between the single version and the one on the album.

== Track listing ==
1. "We Think It's Love" – 3:14
2. "Takin' Back What's Mine" (album version) – 3:40
3. "My Own Thing" – 3:36
4. "Just to Make You" – 3:40
5. "One Word" – 4:24
6. "A Little Messed Up" – 3:47
7. "Missing You" – 3:52
8. "Sweet Baby Dreamer" – 3:34
9. "Crazy" – 3:07
10. "Summer of Love" – 3:08
11. "The Moment" – 3:44
12. "Take a Chance" – 3:55

== Charts ==
Chart performance for Leah
Chart (2001)	Peak position
Australian Albums (ARIA)	40
