= Differently (song) =

Single by Cassie Davis featuring Travie McCoy

from the album Differently
- A-side: "Differently"
- B-side: "Hero"
- Released: 16 March 2009
- Genre: Power pop; electropop
- Length: 3:51
- Label: Sony BMG
- Songwriters: Cassie Davis; Priese Board; Travis McCoy
- Producer: Printz Board

Cassie Davis singles chronology
"Like It Loud" (2009)	"Differently" (2009)	"Do It Again" (2009)

Travie McCoy singles chronology
"Coconut Juice" (2008)	"Differently" (2009)	"Billionaire" (2010)

"Differently" is a song recorded by Australian pop singer Cassie Davis. It is the second single taken off her debut album of the same name. It features guest vocals from Travie McCoy, the lead vocalist of American hip hop group Gym Class Heroes. Signed copies of the single are available if pre-ordered at Sanity or JB Hi-Fi. The song went gold on 18 September 2009.

== Track listing ==
Maxi CD single

1. Differently
2. Hero
3. Differently (Album Version)
4. Differently (Sing-A-Long Mix)
5. Differently (Mirage Mix)

== Airplay ==
"Differently" made its radio debut on 16 March 2009. It has since began to receive heavy airplay on the Today Network (especially "The Hot 30 Countdown") and Sydney radio station, Nova 96.9. "Differently" was the #1 most added song to Australian radio in its first week of release.

== Collaboration ==
Of working with Travie McCoy, Cassie said:

- "I feel incredibly blessed to have had the opportunity to work with many amazing artists on 'Differently.' To have the privilege of working with the creative force that is Travis McCoy has been a truly inspiring, insightful and out-of-this-world experience."
- "Travie is an artist that I am a big fan of and admire. I hope that through my involvement in music my peers will hold me in the same light," added Cassie.

Davis spoke to McCoy on the phone about his contribution, and his rap was recorded separately. They met for the first time on the video set.

- "That was lucky," Davis tells The Back Room.
- "Sometimes you don't even get to meet someone you sing with at the video, it is all done on green screen.
- "We clicked straight away. In our scenes together there was a competition to make each other laugh, a few times we were in hysterics and they had to stop filming. The songs is quite serious but we had so much fun on the set it was hard to be serious."

There was another problem in the video, with McCoy towering over the pocket-sized Davis.

- "Travis must be like 6ft 4in. I'm like 5ft 4in. I definitely stood on a box in the close ups because they couldn't get our heads in the same frame."

== Lyrics ==
Cassie herself stated that "Differently" is a track that celebrates those who are not afraid to go against the grain and embrace their individuality.

== Live performance ==
Cassie performed "Differently" at 7:40am on Australian breakfast television show Sunrise backed by her band including Fish on the drums.

== Music video ==
Davis and McCoy standing face to face in front of a green backdrop in the official music video for "Differently"

=== Details ===
The video clip for 'Differently' was shot in Los Angeles in mid-March 2009. It features Travie McCoy along with Printz Board who was a musical director for The Black Eyed Peas and Fish, the founder of Fishbone both making guest appearances. It made its premiere on Cassie's official YouTube channel on 12 April 2009.

=== Commentary ===
The entire music video takes place in front of a green backdrop with white crosses made up of tape stuck on each of the walls. Cassie undergoes three costume changes in the clip. It begins with Printz and Davis singing the "er, ah" melody together before the first verse kicks in. Quick cuts occur of Travie, Printz playing a keyboard, synthesizer and drum machine while Fish drums for the duration of the video. Cassie is also found playing three different instruments, the first being drums, guitar and then a drum machine. During McCoy's rap verse, the pair are found face to face repetitively moving around one another. There is also another sequence in which Cassie and two female dancers perform set choreography.

== Charts ==
=== Weekly charts ===
Chart (2009)	Peak position
Australian ARIA Singles Chart	29

=== Year-end charts ===
Year	Chart	Rank
2009	Australian Artists Singles 2009	#25

== Certifications ==
Region	Certification	Certified units/sales
Australia (ARIA)	Gold	35,000^{^}
^{^} Shipments figures based on certification alone.

== Release history ==
Country	Release date	Format	Label	Catalogue
Australia	16 March 2009	Radio	Sony BMG	
Australia	24 April 2009	CD single, Digital Download	Sony BMG	88697494122
