= Concrete (student newspaper) =

Student newspaper for the University of East Anglia

- Striving for Truth
- Type: Monthly newspaper
- Format: Compact
- Editor: Emily Pitt-Shaw
- Founded: 22 January 1992; 33 years ago
- Language: English
- Headquarters: Concrete Office, Union House, University of East Anglia, Norwich (UK)
- Circulation: 1,000+
- ISSN: 1351-2773
- Website: www.concreteuea.co.uk
- Free online archives: www.issuu.com/concreteuea

Concrete is the University of East Anglia's student newspaper. Concrete is free and published monthly on a Tuesday, during term time. Concrete is compiled by a team of around forty editorial team members and headed by the Co-Editors-in-Chief. It is distributed throughout campus monthly as a free pickup newspaper and online via their website. Concrete is part of the UEA Media Collective, which also includes the student radio station Livewire and UEA:TV.

Concrete's logo was redesigned in the 2019/20 year to include its new motto, "Striving for Truth". The logo was set on a new background of colours, each of which represents a section of the newspaper. Concrete's sections include News, Global, Features and Interview, Opinion, Science, Lifestyle, Travel, Food and Drink, and Sport, plus an editorial page and a 'Home of the Wonderful' section (called 'Hey UEA' until 2019) rounding up Media Collective and campus news from social media. Sections are each between two and three pages long. Inside Concrete is Venue, a 24-page culture supplement which includes Art, Books, Fashion, Creative Writing, Music, Gaming, Theatre, Film, and TV.

Previous issues have included interviews with Tony Blair, Nick Clegg, Paul McCartney, Coldplay, Stephen Fry, Michael Palin, Harrison Ford and Max Mosley. Concrete also publishes its famous annual sex survey, plus an annual Derby Day pull-out when UEA's sports teams face the University of Essex.

== History ==
Concrete was first published on 22 January 1992, continuing a tradition of student media at UEA that included Phoenix and Insight. There was also an earlier short-lived magazine called Concrete in the 1970s, whose logo was adapted by the newspaper in a redesign in 1997. The paper was originally set up independently of both the university and student union, though with the support of the School of English and American Studies. It became part of the UEA Students' Union in 1995, and formally became a Union society in 2001. It is therefore funded and published by the UEA Students' Union, with writers and editors paying nominal subs. Advertising is also co-ordinated by the Students' Union, however the newspaper retains editorial independence.

Concrete was unusual among UK student newspapers in having a full-time paid student editor who was not a sabbatical officer of the student union. However, in 2012 this system was discontinued, and the job became a part-time unpaid position alongside academic studies. Other senior editorial positions were created on a flexible basis to help alleviate the responsibilities, including Online Editor.

On 29 September 1993 Concrete launched a standalone entertainment supplement called The Event which was offered for sale off-campus. The last standalone edition of The Event was published on 2 March 1994, but the brand was retained. It was replaced by Venue in 2010 which continues as a separate, pull-out magazine inside the paper today.

Since September 2019 Concrete has run the Concrete Mental Health Crisis campaign to promote wellbeing on campus. This followed four student deaths in the space of ten months at UEA. A number of prominent figures have added their names to the campaign, including Stephen Fry, Sir Norman Lamb, Gina Miller, Steve Brine and Clive Lewis. The campaign is also supported by the mother of a student who took his own life while at UEA as well as the university's Vice-Chancellor. By May 2020 UEA launched an opt-in scheme allowing the university to inform a specified person if they have any concerns about the student's welfare, a key aim of Concrete's campaign. The campaign's articles and social media posts have been viewed more than 266,000 times online.

Concrete's website was redesigned prior to the 2012/13 academic year. Concrete often operates a live feed for Derby Day on its website and via social media. The 2019 Derby Day feed garnered almost 5,000 views. Concrete has previously published annual drugs surveys, house-hunting guides and one-off creative writing supplements with Venue. There was a short-lived Finance section in the main paper in the year 2017/18. The following year it was replaced by the 'Hey UEA' section, which became the 'Home of the Wonderful' section for Media Collective news.

== Awards ==
- 1995 The Guardian / NUS Student Media Awards – Winner, Newspaper of the Year
- 2000 The Independent / NUS National Student Journalism Awards - Winner, Best Newspaper
- 2000 The Guardian Student Media Awards – Nominated, Newspaper of the Year
- 2000 The Guardian Student Media Awards – Nominated, Feature Writer of the Year - Stephen Collins
- 2000 The Guardian Student Media Awards – Nominated, Sports Writer of the Year - Nick Henegan
- 2001 The Independent / NUS National Student Journalism Awards – Runner-Up, Best Newspaper
- 2002 The Independent / NUS National Student Journalism Awards – Nominated, Best Reporter - Katie Hind
- 2002 The Independent / NUS National Student Journalism Awards – Nominated, Best Arts Journalist - Charlotte Ronalds
- 2003 The Guardian Student Media Awards – Nominated, Feature Writer of the Year - Jo Locke
- 2003 The Guardian Student Media Awards – Nominated, Newspaper of the Year
- 2003 The Guardian Student Media Awards – Nominated, Feature Writer of the Year - Nathan Dixon
- 2004 The Guardian Student Media Awards – Nominated, Magazine of the Year - The Event supplement
- 2005 The Guardian Student Media Awards – Winner, Travel Writer - Robert Castell
- 2018 BBC Radio 4 Today Student Journalism Awards – Nominated, Best Publication
- 2019 BBC Radio 4 Today Student Journalism Awards – Runner-Up, Best Publication
- 2019 BBC Radio 4 Today Student Journalism Awards – Winner, Best Programme
- 2020 Amnesty Media Awards – Nominated, Student Journalist of the Year - William Warnes
- 2020 SPA Awards - nominated for seven awards in 2020, including Best Publication).
- 2022 SPA Awards - Shortlisted for Best Science Section, Best Sports Section, Best Sports Reporter (Oscar Ress), Best Interview (Dolly Carter), Outstanding Commitment (Dolly Carter), Best Reporter (Dolly Carter), and Best Publication
- 2023 SPA National Awards - Shortlisted for Best Publication, Best Science Section and Best Sport Section.
- 2024 SPA Regional Awards - Best Publication in the Midlands.
- 2025 SPA Regional Awards - Best Publication in the South East and Outstanding Commitment (Co-Editors-in-Chief Fiona Hill and Jamie Bryson.
- 2025 SPA National Awards - Shortlisted for Best Interview (Jamie Bryson), Outstanding Commitment (Jamie Bryson and Fiona Hill) and Best Sports Reporter (Sofia Royal).
