= Cassie Davis =

Australian singer and songwriter

- Born: 5 August 1985 (age 41); Gnangara, Western Australia, Australia
- Occupations: Singer; songwriter; record producer
- Years active: 2008–present
- Partner: Snob Scrilla (2009–2011)
- Musical career
- Genres: Pop; pop rock
- Labels: 12 Stones; Sony BMG; Universal
- Website: officialcassiedavis.com

Cassie Davis (born 1985) is an Australian singer and songwriter from Perth. Davis started writing and recording music as a child. In 2003, aged about 18, she travelled to the US with her older sister where she secured a four-album record deal. Her first single, "Like It Loud" was released in 2009 and reached No. 11 on the ARIA singles chart. It was followed the same year by her second single "Differently", which went gold, her third single, "Do it Again", and her debut album, Differently.

Davis also writes for other artists, including the track "Swagger Rich" for Warren G featuring Snoop Dogg, "Choose You" for Stan Walker, and "Take Me Away" for Marvin Priest featuring Wynter Gordon. In 2011, Davis started a production group with writer/producer Snob Scrilla. Together, they wrote and produced Havana Brown's "We Run The Night", Natalie Bassingthwaighte's "All We Have", "Braveheart" and "Welcome to the Jungle" by Neon Jungle, "Running Back" by Jessica Mauboy and "Choose You" by Stan Walker. In 2012, Davis teamed up to form the electro-pop-house trio Contra, which released the EP, "The 90s Are All That", in 2014. Davis co wrote the song "Get Higher" for Sophie (musician) in 2013.

== Biography ==
Davis was born on 5 August 1985 in Windsor, New South Wales, the daughter of Steven and Meredith Davis. She was raised in Gnangara, Perth, Western Australia, the second child of a family of four. Her father is a pastor in Perth. Davis' parents introduced her to music.

My dad would always put instruments in my hands and encourage me to play music. He pretty much taught me how to sing, and when I was eight my parents bought me my first guitar. I had played piano before that, but it was when I got my guitar that I started to be become creative. I taught myself to play and started writing songs.

— Cassie Davis

Davis recorded her first songs on her home computer at age twelve. In 1999, she did work experience at a local recording studio for three years and learned to use mics, song arranging, basic producing and how to make a good recording. Davis then enrolled at the Western Australian Academy of Performing Arts (WAAPA), where she studied sound engineering and production. In 2003, she travelled to the United States, accompanied by her elder sister, Emma, who handles the business side of their label, 12 Stones.

Emma and I started going back and forth between Australia and New York from the end of 2003. We were songwriting and knocking on doors. Looking back we were so naive to go there and think that we could make it. But all opportunities have come from us stepping out on a limb.

— Cassie Davis

Her younger brother, Joseph, also plays guitar in her band.

Davis wrote and recorded the majority of her album independently. She also worked with producer Printz Board, producer Rodney Jerkins and songwriter/producer Wayne Wilkins who brought her in to work on a number of writing and production projects.

In a 2009 article in Rolling Stone Australia, Davis describes herself as

I'm like a bitzer. I never wanted to be 'an artist', I always wanted to be known as 'a producer' or 'a writer' as well.

== Career ==
=== 2009–present: Differently ===
Davis landed a worldwide four-album deal with Sony BMG through her label 12 Stones. Her debut release was the single "Like It Loud" which reached No. 11 on the ARIA singles chart. Davis performed "Like It Loud" on Week 2: Top 18 Results episode of So You Think You Can Dance Australia backed by her band and 50 dancers.

In support of her single "Like It Loud", Davis joined forces with Australian clothing label Supre to create a limited edition T-shirt. Cathy Van Der Meulen said "Cassie is such an exciting new talent and represents everything our brand stands for in an Australian girl...fun, fashionable and forward thinking. Cassie is going to be an Australian icon not unlike Supre."

Her second single "Differently" was released in Australia on 24 April 2009. The music video features Travis McCoy, Printz Board and Fish from Fishbone. The third single, "Do it Again", was co-written by former Australian artist Leah Haywood, and Daniel James and produced under Haywood and James moniker Dreamlab. 'Do it Again' was released digitally and physically on 7 August.

Davis' debut album was released in 14 August 2009. Cassie Davis' second single "Differently" was certified Gold on 18 September 2009. Cassie Davis also wrote and appears on Warren G's 2009 album The G Files, with Snoop Dogg on the track "Swagger Rich" which appeared on the final season of Ugly Betty.

Cassie is currently the ambassador for Camp Quality and their new program for high school students "The Teenage Alchemist" which is the children's family cancer charity that believes in bring optimism and happiness to the lives of children and families affected by cancer through fun therapy. "I'm thrilled to be helping Camp Quality spread optimism through high schools and to be involved in educating teenagers about cancer, making positive life choices and peer pressure. I want to encourage people to be strong and stay true to who they are and I think The Teenage Alchemist is a great way to get the message out there", said Cassie.

In early 2010, Cassie wrote a single titled "Choose You" for Stan Walker's second studio album From the Inside Out.

In 2011, Cassie started a production group called More Mega with fellow writer/producer Snob Scrilla. Together, they wrote and produced Havana Brown's debut single "We Run The Night". The song was released in late April, and was the first Australian track to debut in the top 10 in 2011 and is certified double platinum. They also produced and wrote Havana browns second single "Get It"

Cassie co-wrote the song "Take Me Away" for Marvin Priest featuring Wynter Gordon.

More recently, they have produced and written the newly released song "All We Have" for X-factor judge Natalie Bassingthwaighte, "Braveheart" and "Welcome to the Jungle"by Neon Jungle, "Running Back" by Jessica Mauboy and "Choose You" by Stan Walker.

Cassie changed her name to Brooklyn Young for a little while during the early 2012, with no music emerging under that name. Then she went my the moniker BABY.

In 2012, Davis teamed up with two dudes in Los Angeles to form an electro-pop-house group called Contra. They performed small shows around Los Angeles to warm up for their EP, The 90s Are All That. The 90s Are All That was released in 2014.

== Personal life ==
Cassie was in a relationship with Snob Scrilla in 2009. Cassie welcomed her first child in 2015.

== Discography ==
=== Studio albums ===
Year	Album details	Peak positions
Year	Album details	AUS
2009	Differently: Release date: 14 August 2009; Label: Sony Music/12 Stones	14

=== Singles ===
Year	Single	Peak positions	Certifications	Album
Year	Single	AUS	Certifications	Album
2009	"Like It Loud"	11	AUS: Gold	Differently
2009	"Differently" (featuring Travis McCoy)	29	AUS: Gold	Differently
2009	"Do It Again"	24		Differently
2009	"No More"	90		Differently
2010	"Don't Wanna Dance"	–		Differently

=== Music videos ===
Year	Song title	Album	Director
2008	"Boys Don't Cry"	B-side	N/A
2009	"Like It Loud"	Differently	Straighty180
2009	"Differently"	Differently	Straighty 180
2009	"Do It Again"	Differently	Toby Angwin
2009	"No More"	Differently	Toby Angwin
2010	"Don't Wanna Dance"	Differently	Laura Dudgeon
