= Interpolation (disambiguation) =

Interpolation is a method of constructing new data points within the range of a discrete set of known data points in the mathematical field of numerical analysis.

Interpolation may also refer to:

== Science and technology ==
- Interpolation space, in mathematical analysis, the space "in between" two other Banach spaces
- Craig interpolation, in mathematical logic, a result about the relationship between logical theories
- Interpolation (computer graphics), the generation of intermediate frames
  - Image scaling, the resizing of a digital image
  - Inbetweening, the generation of intermediate video frames
  - Motion interpolation, a form of video processing
- Interpolation theory, an explanation of the alternation of generations in plants
- String interpolation, in computing, the substitution of variables by their values

== Music ==
- Interpolation (classical music), musical material inserted between two logically succeeding functions
- Interpolation (popular music), the inclusion of a re-recorded (rather than sampled) element of another song

== Manuscripts ==
- Interpolation (manuscripts), a passage not written by the original author
  - Christian interpolation, the insertion of Christian text into Jewish or secular manuscripts
