= No Introduction =

Studio album by Tyga
- Released: June 10, 2008 (US)
- Recorded: 2005–08
- Genre: Pop-rap
- Length: 45:04
- Label: Decaydance; BatSquad
- Producer: Pete Wentz (exec.); Patrick Stump; S*A*M & Sluggo; Evan Big Evil; Lu Balz; Stress; Clayton Haraba

Tyga chronology
No Introduction (2008)	Careless World: Rise of the Last King (2012)

Singles from No Introduction
- 1. "Diamond Life" Released: December 17, 2007; 2. "Coconut Juice" Released: March 22, 2008; 3. "AIM" Released: January 3, 2009

No Introduction is the debut studio album by American rapper Tyga. It was released on June 10, 2008, by Decaydance Records, serving as Tyga's first independent release with the label. Recording sessions took place from 2005 to 2008, with Pete Wentz serving as the records executive producers, while the production was handled by Patrick Stump and S*A*M & Sluggo; as well as two guest appearances from Tyga's then-label-mates Travie McCoy and Alex DeLeon, among others.

The album was supported by three singles: "Diamond Life" featuring Patty Crash, "Coconut Juice" featuring Travie McCoy, and "AIM".

== Music and lyrics ==
According to AllMusic, No Introduction is an album of "slick, polished pop-rap" having "the widest (or most mainstream) appeal possible".

== Singles ==
The album's debut single, called "Diamond Life" was released on December 17, 2007. The song features guest vocals from Patty Crash, while the production was handled by S*A*M & Sluggo.

The album's second single, called "Coconut Juice" was released on March 22, 2008. The song features guest vocals from California recording artist Travie McCoy, who was the first to sign Tyga, while the production was handled by S*A*M & Sluggo.

The album's third and final single, "AIM" was released on January 3, 2009. The song was produced by S*A*M & Sluggo, and Lu Balz.

== Critical reception ==
Professional ratings
Review scores
Source	Rating
AllMusic	3/5 stars
HipHopDX	3/5 stars
RapReviews	(6/10)

AllMusic editor Jason Lymangrover, talking about Tyga's presence as a rapper on the record, said: "his voice is smooth, his attack is skillful, and regardless of the inherent lack of depth, the disc is a fun and easygoing romp, fitting for a Friday drive home or a trip to the club." Andres Tardio from HipHopDX praised Tyga for being able to construct "inspirational tales about broken families ("Don't Regret It Now", "2 AM")" with an ability to "derive soulful rhymes from his life's tribulations" but criticized the record for containing "terrible love songs ("AIM", "First Timers")" and tracks with a "flawed concept ("Cartoonz", "EST. (80's Baby))", saying that "No Introduction is a nice album for the teens with a few gems sprinkled in between. While the album isn't exactly great, it does have a lot to applaud." Susan Kim of RapReviews also commended Tyga for delivering fierce and powerful lyricism on tracks like "Don't Regret It Now", "2 AM" and "Diamond Life" but felt his reversion to "rudimentary wordplay and subject matter" and "failed love ballads" with uninspiring piano melodies to appeal to a younger demographic hampers his longevity in the hip hop scene, saying that "[I]n his debut, Tyga's No Introduction is a hit or miss. Some may praise that the maturity in his lyricism is apparent in tracks about his family, while other may see his lyricism to be undeveloped when viewed as a whole. Taking into consideration that his fan base probably consists of young, teenage girls, his debut wasn't a definite flop after all."

== Track listing ==
No.	Title	Producer(s)	Length
1.	"Diamond Life" (featuring Patty Crash)	S*A*M & Sluggo	3:26
2.	"Coconut Juice" (featuring Travie McCoy)	S*A*M & Sluggo	3:29
3.	"Supersize Me"	Patrick Stump	3:33
4.	"Don't Regret It Now" (featuring Patrick Stump)	Patrick Stump	3:59
5.	"Pillow Talkin'"	Stress	4:17
6.	"AIM"	Lu Balz; S*A*M & Sluggo	3:24
7.	"First Timers" (featuring Evan Taubenfeld)	Evan Big Evil	3:43
8.	"Cartoonz"	S*A*M & Sluggo	3:20
9.	"Summertime"	Stress	3:01
10.	"Press 7" (featuring Alex DeLeon)	Evan Big Evil	3:45
11.	"Woww"	Patrick Stump	2:38
12.	"2 AM"	Stress	3:55
13.	"Est. (80's Baby)"	Patrick Stump	2:34
Total length:			45:04

iTunes Store bonus track
No.	Title	Producer(s)	Length
14.	"I Am" (featuring Lil Wayne)	Clayton Haraba	3:28

Japanese edition bonus tracks
No.	Title	Length
14.	"Horrifyin Man"	3:42
15.	"Magical Flow"	2:40

Notes

- "Diamond Life" was featured in the video games; including 2008's Need for Speed: Undercover and 2009's Madden, the song was also included in the movie Fighting (2009).

== Charts ==
Chart (2008)	Peak position	Shipments/sales
US Billboard 200	112	6,795
