= The Moon Under Water (album) =

Studio album by Ryan Cabrera
- Released: May 13, 2008
- Recorded: 2006–2008
- Genre: Pop rock
- Length: 42:02
- Label: Papa Joe/ EMI
- Producer: Dreamlab

Ryan Cabrera chronology
You Stand Watching (2005)	The Moon Under Water (2008)

Singles from The Moon Under Water
- 1. "Say" Released: February 25, 2008; 2. "Enemies" Released: June 10, 2008

Professional ratings
Review scores
Source	Rating
Allmusic	3.5/5 stars

The Moon Under Water is the fourth studio album by American pop/rock singer Ryan Cabrera. It was released on May 13, 2008 in the U.S. The album was preceded by its first single, "Say", which was released in February. It failed to generate success, which contributed in the album's low debut at number hundred seventy-seven (#177) on the Billboard 200, with 8,500 sales in its first week. The next week, the album dropped out of the chart. Therefore, the second single's release date had been moved up to early June, turning out to be "Enemies". Independently, the album sold over 15,000 copies to date.

"Say" received positive responses from some critics, but the single flopped commercially. Chuck Taylor of Billboard magazine described it as "the catchiest, coolest, most immediate release of the year." Allmusic's Stephen Thomas Erlewine referred to the song as a "near-incandescent pop tune almost worthy of Gregg Alexander."

== Track listing ==
1. "In Between Lights" – 3:56
2. "Enemies" – 3:45
3. "Say" – 3:37
4. "Rise (The Dog Barks)" – 5:20
5. "Sit Back, Relax" – 3:41
6. "The Tango" – 3:21
7. "How Bout Tonite" – 3:42
8. "I Shoulda Kissed U" – 3:43
9. "Say You Will" – 4:15
10. "Please Don't Lie" – 3:24
11. "I Will Remember You" – 3:17

Bonus tracks

1. "Say" (Drama Remix) [Wal-Mart Bonus Track] - 3:38
2. "Enemies" (Acoustic) [Wal-Mart.com Bonus Track] - 4:05
3. "Sit Back, Relax" (Ryan Cabrera Remix) [iTunes Bonus Track] - 4:27
4. "Enemies" (Dan Remix) [Target Bonus Track] - 3:52
5. "Say" (Acoustic) [Target Bonus Track] - 3:43

== Charts ==
Chart (2008)	Peak position
US Billboard 200	177
