= Differently (album) =

Studio album by Cassie Davis
- Released: 14 August 2009
- Recorded: 2008–2009
- Genres: Pop, rock
- Length: 43:05; 53:25 (bonus track version)
- Label: Sony Music/12 Stones
- Producers: Cassie Davis, Printz Board, Rodney Jerkins, Wayne Wilkins

Singles from Differently
- 1. "Like It Loud" Released: 23 January 2009; 2. "Differently" Released: 24 April 2009; 3. "Do It Again" Released: 7 August 2009; 4. "No More" Released: 6 November 2009; 5. "Don't Wanna Dance" Released: 9 April 2010

Differently is the only album by Australian singer Cassie Davis and was released on 14 August 2009. Davis herself wrote and produced most of the album, with the help of producers Printz Board, Rodney Jerkins and Wayne Wilkins.

== Singles ==
- "Like It Loud" was released for digital download on 22 January 2009 with the CD single following a day later. It reached number eleven on the Australian ARIA Singles Chart, stayed on the top fifty for twelve weeks and was recently certified gold with shipments of over 35,000 copies.
- "Differently" featuring Gym Class Heroes' Travis McCoy, was released to Australian radio in March 2009 and physically on 24 April 2009. It debuted at number fifty on the ARIA Singles Chart but has risen to number twenty-nine. It was certified GOLD in September 2009
- "Do It Again" was released as the third single in August 2009. It eventually peaked at #24 on the Singles Chart.
- "No More" is the fourth single from the album and was released to Australian radio on 28 September 2009. It debuted on the Australian ARIA SIngles Chart on 6 December 2009 at #100, and rose 10 spots to 90 the following week to have a new peak on the aria charts.
- "Don't Wanna Dance" was released on 9 April 2010. The video was released in early March. It is also the final single released from the album.

== Charts ==
Chart (2009)	Peak position
Australian ARIA Albums Chart	14

=== End of year charts ===
Year	Chart	Rank
2009	Australian Artists Albums 2009	#42

== Track listing and writing credits ==
No.	Title	Writer(s)	Length
1.	"Don't Wanna Dance"	Cassie Davis, Jimmy Harry	3:07
2.	"Like It Loud"	Cassie Davis	3:06
3.	"Reset"	Cassie Davis, Peter Zizzo	2:47
4.	"Criminal"	Cassie Davis, Wayne Wilkins	3:38
5.	"Do It Again"	Cassie Davis, Leah Haywood, Dan James	2:52
6.	"Nothing You Can Do"	Cassie Davis, Richard Vision, Chico Bennett	2:59
7.	"Differently"	Cassie Davis, Printz Board	3:26
8.	"No More"	Wayne Wilkins, Nina Woodford	3:42
9.	"Mess of Mine"	Cassie Davis	4:21
10.	"Do What I Do"	Cassie Davis	3:17
11.	"Necessarily"	Cassie Davis	3:13
12.	"Amazing"	Cassie Davis	4:00
13.	"Hero"	Cassie Davis	2:37
14.	"Differently" (featuring Travis McCoy)	Cassie Davis, Printz Board, Travis McCoy	3:50
15.	"Do It Again (Denzal Park Mix)"		6:35

== Personnel ==
- Printz Board – producer, songwriter (album, "Reset", "Differently", "Mess of Mine", "Differently")
- Rodney Jerkins – producer (album)
- Wayne Wilkins – producer, songwriter (album, "Criminal", "No More")
- Jimmy Harry – producer, songwriter ("Don't Wanna Dance")
- Peter Zizzo – songwriter ("Reset")
- Leah Haywood – songwriter ("Do It Again")
- Dan James – songwriter ("Do It Again")
- Rug – songwriter ("Do It Again")
- Dream Lab – producer ("Do It Again")
- Richard Vission – producer, songwriter ("Nothing You Can Do")
- Chico Bennett – producer, songwriter ("Nothing You Can Do")
- Nina Woodford – songwriter ("No More")
- Travis McCoy – featured artist, co-writer ("Differently")

== Release history ==
Country	Release date	Label	Format	Catalogue
Australia	14 August 2009	Sony BMG	CD Album, Digital Album	88697577452
