= We Think It's Love =

2000 single by Leah Haywood

Single by Leah Haywood

from the album Leah
- B-side: "...And If I Could"
- Released: 21 February 2000
- Studio: Cheiron (Stockholm, Sweden)
- Length: 3:17
- Label: Epic
- Songwriters: Jörgen Elofsson; Leah Haywood
- Producers: David Kreuger; Per Magnusson

Leah Haywood singles chronology
"We Think It's Love" (2000)	"Crazy" (2000)

"We Think It's Love" is a song by Australian singer Leah Haywood, released as her debut single in February 2000. Co-written by Haywood and Jorgen Elofsson, it is Haywood's biggest hit off her debut album, Leah (2001), peaking at number seven on the Australian Singles Chart and spending 18 weeks in the top 50.

== Chart performance ==
On 5 March 2000, the song debuted at number 41 on the Australian ARIA Singles Chart, falling off the listing the next week. However, it reappeared at number 42 the following week and began to climb the chart, reaching its peak of number seven on 30 April. It stayed on the chart for 10 more weeks, dropping out of the top 50 on 16 July. It was certified Gold by the Australian Recording Industry Association, and at the end of 2000, it was ranked as the 79th-highest-selling single of Australia.

== Music video ==
There are two different music videos for "We Think It's Love". The original video was shot in early 2000 and features Haywood in a futuristic underground basement club where she meets her boyfriend and tells him off before walking away and leaving the place. During the bridge of the song she is seen running in slow motion in the middle of the rain. Throughout the second chorus there is a special shot of Haywood singing with a few dancers in the back where the frame is paused while the camera continues to turn 180 degrees left and right giving a sense of a 3D world. The video ends with Haywood leaving a voicemail message to her lover that they have been "going on far too long", with the words appearing on her computer screen in the same way that video started out with her settling down on to her computer seat.

An alternate video was shot a few months later in Barcelona where Haywood enters a modern house full of advanced technological surroundings which is transformed into a large garden maze during the second chorus. The garden maze then reverts into the modern-tech house before changing into a forest with Haywood during the bridge of the song. Towards the climax of the video, there are shots of a wet Haywood singing under a waterfall just as the video fades out of her walking across a room in the modern-tech house.

Cameron Casey directed the alternate video. It is also likely that the alternate music video was shot specifically for the UK market since Haywood was about to start promoting the song in the UK months after it had charted successfully in Australia. The alternate version was soon to be featured in the Australian commercial promo for her album, even though it was rarely ever aired in full (or possibly never at all) on Australian television.

== Track listings ==
The single was released in three formats. It was first released as a digipak single where it housed a special "clear disc" and then later in a slimline jewel-case packaging which came with bonus stickers of Haywood and other "Sony" music label artistes and an enhanced multimedia screensaver section on the disc. It was finally released on a 12-inch vinyl which contained two remixes that were unavailable on either CD single releases. Both CD releases contain the ballad B-side track "...And If I Could", which never appeared on the album. The track was co-written and co-produced by Haywood and Sydney music producer Barbara Griffin.

Digipak CD single

1. "We Think It's Love" – 3:17
2. "We Think It's Love" (Discothèque Club remix edit) – 4:02
3. "We Think It's Love" (Patric's Lounge remix) – 4:55
4. "...And If I Could" – 3:35

Slimline jewel case CD single

1. "We Think It's Love" – 3:17
2. "We Think It's Love" (Discothèque Club remix edit) – 4:02
3. "We Think It's Love" (Patric's Lounge remix) – 4:55
4. "...And If I Could" – 3:37
5. Multimedia

12-inch single

A1. "We Think It's Love" (Tasty Club remix)
A2. "We Think It's Love" (Discothèque Club remix)
B1. "We Think It's Love" (Kitten's Kitchen Sink remix)
B2. "We Think It's Love" (Patric's club remix)

== Charts ==
=== Weekly charts ===
Chart (2000)	Peak position
Australia (ARIA)	7

=== Year-end charts ===
Chart (2000)	Position
Australia (ARIA)	79

== Certifications ==
Region	Certification	Certified units/sales
Australia (ARIA)	Gold	35,000^{^}
^{^} Shipments figures based on certification alone.
