= LoveHateHero =

American rock band (2003–2011)

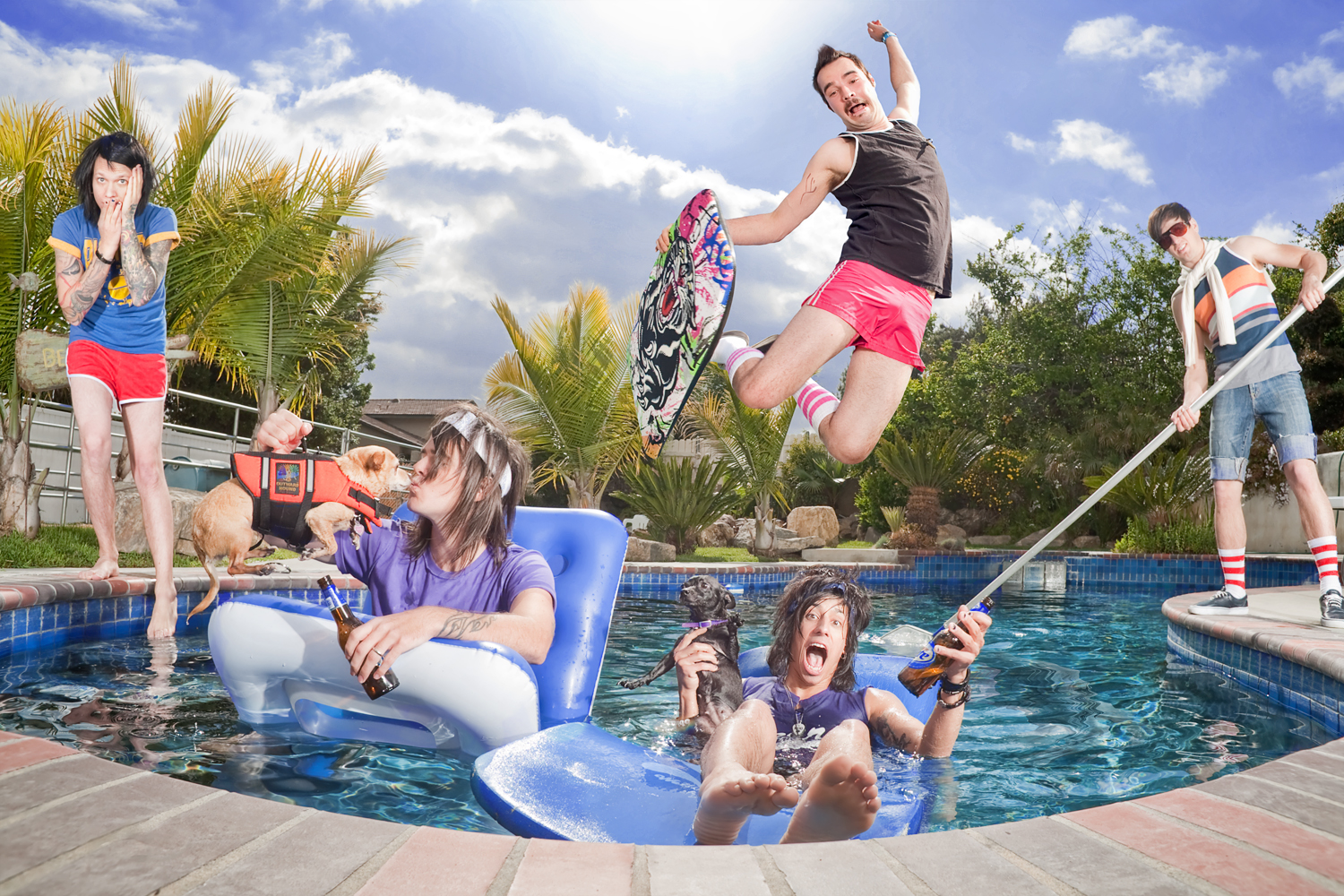
- Promo shot of LoveHateHero for The Wet Hot American Summer Tour in 2010

Background information
- Origin: Burbank, California, U.S.
- Genres: Post-hardcore; pop-punk
- Years active: 2003–2011
- Label: Ferret
- Spinoffs: Escape the Fate; XO Stereo
- Past members: Pierrick Berube; Paris Bosserman; Kevin "Thrasher" Gruft; Justin Whitesel; Scott Gee; Josh Newman; Omar Espinosa; Bryan Ross; Mark Johnston; Myke Russell
- Website: www.lovehatehero.com

LoveHateHero was an American rock band formed in Burbank, California in 2003 by vocalist Pierrick Berube, guitarists Josh Newman and Mark Johnston, bassist Paris Bosserman, and drummer Bryan Ross. They were signed to Ferret Music and released three albums, Just Breathe in May 2005, White Lies in February 2007, and America Underwater in November 2009.

== About ==
They have toured with bands such as Chiodos, Eighteen Visions, Funeral for a Friend, He Is Legend, and It Dies Today. They appeared on the Black on Black Tour with Escape the Fate, Blessthefall, Before Their Eyes, and Dance Gavin Dance.

During October and November 2007, LoveHateHero co-headlined a tour with So They Say that featured support from National Product, Tokyo Rose, and Before Their Eyes.

In 2008, they went on the One Moment Management Tour with Before Their Eyes, I See Stars, Oceana, Eyes Set to Kill and Ice Nine Kills as well as their TerminaTOUR with Blessed by a Broken Heart, Agraceful, Karate Highschool, and Kiros.

In 2009 they were on the Dead or Alive Tour with I Am Ghost and Karate Highschool, the Revolver Tour with Eyes Set To Kill and Dreaming of Eden, the Napalm and Noise Tour with The Devil Wears Prada, All That Remains, and Story of the Year as well as a monthlong Brazil Tour with Mr. Clown.

They played on the Vans Warped Tour 2009 at the Seattle, Portland, Fresno, San Francisco, Sacramento, and San Diego venues.

In 2010 they headlined the America Underwater Tour with Four Letter Lie, Sleeping With Sirens, Of Machines, and Destruction of a Rose, did their first European Tour with Blessed by a Broken Heart and are currently on the Wet Hot American Summer Tour with Young and Divine and The Venetia Fair. The band shot a music video for their first single off America Underwater for the song America Underwater.

In June 2010, the song "America Underwater" became available for purchase on the Rock Band Network for PS3, Xbox 360, and Wii.

== Band members ==
Final line-up

- Pierrick Berube - lead vocals, additional guitars and keyboards (2003–2011)
- Arthur "Paris" Bosserman - bass, piano, backing vocals (2003–2011; died 2025)
- Scott Gee - drums, percussion, piano (2005–2011)
- Kevin "Thrasher" Gruft - lead guitar, backing vocals (2006–2011)
- Justin Whitesel - rhythm guitar, keyboards, synthesizers, piano, programming, arrangements, backing vocals (2008–2011)

Former

- Josh Newman - rhythm guitar, backing vocals (2003–2005)
- Omar Espinosa - lead guitar, backing vocals (2003–2004)
- Mark Johnston - lead guitar, backing vocals (2004–2005)
- Bryan Ross - drums, percussion, additional guitar, backing vocals (2004–2005)
- Myke Russell - rhythm guitar, vocals (2005–2008), lead guitar (2005–2006)

Timeline

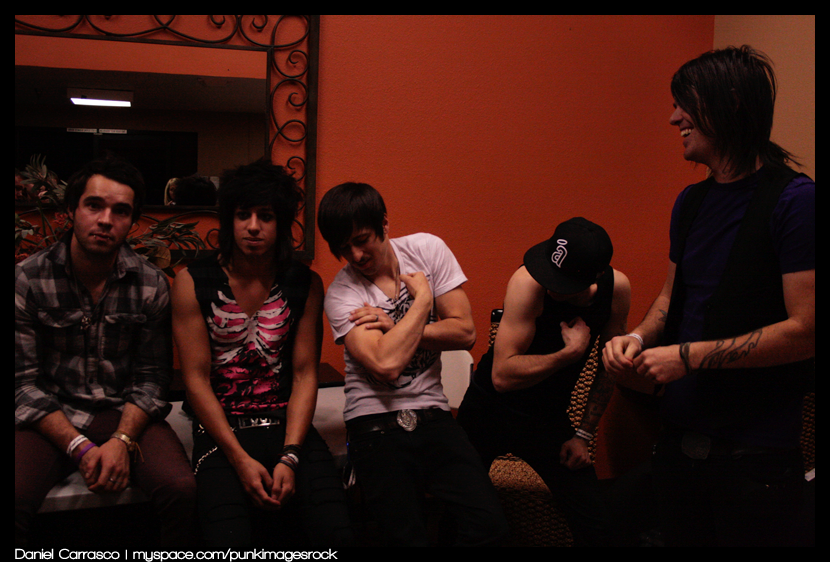
LoveHateHero 2009 Promo Shot

== Discography ==
- Just Breathe (2005)
- White Lies (2007)
- America Underwater (2009)
