= For You (Selena Gomez album) =

2014 greatest hits album by Selena Gomez

Greatest hits album by Selena Gomez
- Released: November 24, 2014
- Recorded: 2008–2014
- Genre: Dance-pop
- Length: 51:52
- Language: English; Spanish
- Label: Hollywood
- Producer: Rock Mafia; Devrim Karaoglu; Steve Hammons; Dubkiller; Jon Vella; Xander Singh; Ace Ha; Stargate; Dreamlab; Ester Dean; Antonina Armato; Tim James; Emanuel Kiriakou; Kevin Rudolf; Andrew Bolooki; Jeff Halatrax; Jon Lind; Brian Reeves; The Monsters & Strangerz; Jason Evigan; Dan Book; Boy Lightning; The Cataracs; Niles Hollowell-Dhar; David Kuncio; Toby Gad; Dave Audé; SuperSpy; Humberto Gatica; Ted Bruner; Trey Vittetoe; Thomas Armato Sturges

Selena Gomez chronology
Stars Dance (2013)	For You (2014)	Revival (2015)

Singles from For You
- 1. "The Heart Wants What It Wants" Released: November 6, 2014

For You is the first greatest hits album by American singer Selena Gomez. The album was released on November 24, 2014, through Hollywood Records. It contains material from Gomez's band Selena Gomez & the Scene, as well as her releases as a solo artist under Hollywood Records. The album serves as her final project to be released through Hollywood Records, with whom she released four studio albums and a remix album. It includes two previously unreleased songs, produced by Rock Mafia, as well as new versions of some previously released recordings. A four-track extended play version containing some of the new material was released digitally on March 31, 2015.

The album received a generally favorable reception upon its release; it was seen as a fair representation of her music career, while the new material was praised for its "mature" sound. For You achieved moderate commercial success, debuting at number 24 on the Billboard 200 chart, selling 36,000 equivalent album units during its first week of release. The project saw a similar commercial performance worldwide, entering the lower end of eleven total countries. The album has reportedly sold 112,000 copies in the United States as of January 2020.

For You received minimal promotion prior to its release. "The Heart Wants What It Wants" was released as the sole single from the project on November 6, 2014; the album was announced and put up for pre-order the same day. The song and its accompanying music video received positive reviews from critics, who praised Gomez's new sound after she was criticized for her heavy EDM style, from her last project Stars Dance. The single went on to become her second top ten hit on the Billboard Hot 100 chart in the United States, and sold over one million copies in the country. It achieved similar success in multiple countries worldwide as well. Gomez performed the song live at the American Music Awards of 2014 the day before the album's release date.

== Background ==
Gomez first signed with Hollywood Records in 2008, and formed her band Selena Gomez & the Scene the following year. The group released three studio albums together. Gomez announced the group would take a hiatus in 2012, as she would be focusing on her acting career. Despite this, Gomez later began working on both a Spanish album and her solo debut album; the Spanish album went unreleased. Gomez released her debut album, Stars Dance, in 2013. Following the cancellation of the planned third single from Stars Dance, rumors began circulating that Gomez would be parting ways with Hollywood Records. Gomez later cancelled the Australian and Asian legs of her Stars Dance Tour (2013), claiming she wanted to spend time with her family. In January 2014, Gomez entered a rehabilitation center, though a representative confirmed that it was not for substance abuse. Despite initially neglecting to comment, Gomez confirmed in 2015 that she had been diagnosed with an auto-immune disease named lupus, and that she had cancelled the tour and entered rehab to undergo chemotherapy.

Rumors of Gomez releasing a greatest hits album began circulating as early as July 2014. Early reports claimed that Gomez planned to release the album to fulfill her contract with Hollywood Records, which required Gomez to release one more album through the label. Gomez later fired her parents as her managers, signing with the WME and Brillstein companies. This decision fueled the rumors of Gomez leaving her label, and speculation began to arise that she was in talks with Interscope Records. The track list for the album was revealed on October 31, when Amazon.com in France temporarily posted the album on their site. Gomez appeared on On Air with Ryan Seacrest to debut the lead single, "The Heart Wants What It Wants" (2014), and officially announced that For You was available for pre-order through digital retailers. Gomez hoped that the release of the single and subsequent album would provide her with a "clean slate" going into 2015.

== Content and artwork ==
"The Heart Wants What It Wants" was written by Gomez, alongside Antonina Armato, Tim James and David Jost; Gomez worked with longtime collaborators Rock Mafia to produce the song. The song was initially recorded for inclusion on Stars Dance (2013), though was not featured on the album for unknown reasons. "The Heart Wants What It Wants" differs from Gomez's previous releases, featuring elements of R&B music and a minimal electropop beat. The song lyrically speaks of a troubled romance, and was inspired by Gomez's publicized relationship with Canadian pop singer Justin Bieber. Gomez premiered the song on November 6 during an interview with Ryan Seacrest, and said "It's also a step for me knowing like, 'Ok, this is what I'm about to say, and I need to say it when I'm ready' [...] And I think after this year, it's the perfect way to end the year, it's the perfect way to end a chapter in a way. It's like, this is what I'll say about every single person that has judged me for every decision that I've made, for every person, [and] heart that is being judged for something they've done, and now I just want to release it."

"Do It" was also written by Gomez, Armato, James, and Jost; production was handled by Rock Mafia, Dubkiller, and Thomas Armato Sturges. The song is much lighter than "The Heart Wants What It Wants", being an upbeat song that has been described as "sexy" by critics. "Do It" features sexual innuendos and hidden meanings, and sees Gomez singing about her desire to "do it every single day". The song leaked online days prior to the release of the album, and garnered media attention for its themes. Gomez compared the song to releases from Lily Allen, and described "Do It" as a "cute little catchy song and I thought it'd be a great little bonus track for the album." "My Dilemma 2.0" is a previously unreleased remix to a song taken from Selena Gomez & the Scene's album When the Sun Goes Down (2011). The Rock Mafia produced remix was set to be released as the fourth and final single from the album, featuring a guest rap from Flo Rida; the single's release was cancelled for unknown reasons, and the release of the remix was scrapped. The version featured on For You has omitted the rap verse, and is credited solely to Selena Gomez & the Scene. "Forget Forever", taken from Stars Dance (2013), is also featured in remixed form. The fifth and final new release is "Más", the Spanish language version of a song taken from the Selena Gomez & the Scene album Kiss & Tell (2009). The song was reportedly recorded for Gomez's first Spanish spoken album, which went unreleased.

The previously released material featured on For You spans across the entirety of Gomez's music career. On the project, Gomez stated "I love my music so much and that’s the idea of this album…kind of collecting the past four years and my favorite songs that I’ve been able to do from when I was 15 to now being 22." The album features all of her singles both as a solo artist and with Selena Gomez & the Scene, excluding "Hit the Lights" (2012). Both "Naturally" (2010) and "A Year Without Rain" (2010) appear as the Dave Audé remixed versions. "Tell Me Something I Don't Know" (2008) is included on the album as the remixed featured on her band's debut album. For You also includes Gomez remix of the late Selena Quintanilla-Pérez single "Bidi Bidi Bom Bom" (1994), which Gomez recorded as a duet with the deceased singer for the remix album Enamorada de Ti (2012). The artwork featured on both the album cover and its inner booklet is taken from the music video for "The Heart Wants What It Wants". The digital extended play features the same cover art with a blue tint.

== Critical reception ==
Professional ratings
Review scores
Source	Rating
AllMusic	4/5 stars
AXS	3.5/5
Idolator	3.5/5
The Times of India	3/5

For You received a generally mixed to positive reception upon its release. AllMusic gave the album four out of five stars, writing "Gomez might not be a belter or have the electric personality of some of her contemporaries; what she does possess is style, a winning voice, and lots of good songs – as For You proves again and again." AXS gave the album a score of three and a half, claiming that "Instead of just packaging her hits, Gomez's For You is layered with elements of her personality. The album reflects Selena's highs and lows from the past five years in the industry and serves as closure to her time with Hollywood Records. She sneaks in a few last words with love and that's something any fan can appreciate." Idolator also gave the album a three and a half, and wrote "If you’ve slept on Selena’s music career, For You is a great starting point. For fans, it offers just enough new material to justify the purchase." The site went on to praise both "The Heart Wants What It Wants" and "Do It". The Times of India gave the album a score of three out of five, praising the new material but questioning whether Gomez's career warranted a compilation album at that point. They added, "For You really is all about growth. We've got the punky-emo cuts like "Falling Down" to salacious songs like "Come & Get It" and also uplifting anthems that have defined her musical career till date." Popology also praised the album, saying "At the end of it, For You shows us where she’s been, where she’s at right now, and where she’s going. It may not include every single release, but the new songs are what counts. They show that she has a vision for herself outside of Hollywood Records. We think we speak for all of her fans when we say we can’t wait to take the next step of her journey with her!"

== Commercial performance ==
The album was released to a minimal amount of promo, excluding a performance of "The Heart Wants What It Wants" at the American Music Awards of 2014. Initial estimations saw For You selling 15,000 copies for its first week, though these numbers slightly increased as the week went on. The album debuted at number twenty-four on the Billboard 200 with first week sales of 35,506 equivalent album units. The album sold 17,139 copies in its first week. During its second week of release, the album fell to number forty four on the chart; it once more fell to number fifty two the following week, remaining there for two weeks. The album rose to number thirty nine the next week, aided in part to the ongoing success of the project's lead single. For You rose once more to number thirty one for its sixth week, with a total of 18,000 equivalent album units sold for the week. Billboard reported that 60% of these units were from "The Heart Wants What It Wants", with For You selling 7,200 copies for the week. The album rose once more to number twenty nine in its seventh week, though declined down the chart in subsequent weeks.

For You went on to spend a total of eighteen weeks on the Billboard 200 chart, the lowest of her albums thus far. The album has sold 89,000 copies in the United States as of July 2015, according to Billboard. Despite the minor success of For You in the United States, it failed to achieve much success outside of the country. Initial reports claimed that the album would reach the top forty in the United Kingdom, becoming her fifth album to do so. Despite this, the album entered the chart at number sixty four, marking her lowest charting effort in the country to date. The album fell out of the top seventy five the following week, and failed to re-enter. The album fared similarly in Ireland, debuting and peaking at number ninety five in the country. For You had minor success in territories such as Italy, Norway, and Spain, reaching the lower part of the top forty in each country. The album went on to sell over 20,000 copies in Brazil, earning it a gold certification in the country. This serves as the album's only certification worldwide. The album has sold over 100,000 copies worldwide since it was released.

== Track listing ==
Credits adapted from the album's liner notes

For You track listing
No.	Title	Writer(s)	Original album	Length
1.	"The Heart Wants What It Wants"	Selena Gomez; Antonina Armato; David Jost; Tim James		3:47
2.	"Come & Get It"	Ester Dean; Mikkel Eriksen; Tor Hermansen	Stars Dance, 2013	3:51
3.	"Love You like a Love Song"	Armato; James; Adam Schmalholz	When the Sun Goes Down, 2011	3:08
4.	"Tell Me Something I Don't Know"	Armato; Ralph Churchwell; Michael Nielsen	Kiss & Tell, 2009	2:55
5.	"Who Says"	Emanuel Kiriakou; Priscilla Hamilton	When the Sun Goes Down	3:15
6.	"My Dilemma 2.0"	Armato; James; Karaoglu	When the Sun Goes Down^{[b]}	3:09
7.	"Round & Round"	Kevin Rudolf; Jacob Kasher; Fefe Dobson; Jeff Halavacs; Andrew Bolooki	A Year Without Rain, 2010	3:05
8.	"Forget Forever" (St£fan remix)	Jason Evigan; Marcus Lomax; Alexander Izquierdo; Jordan Johnson; Stefan Johnson; Clarence Coffee	Stars Dance^{[b]}	3:46
9.	"Slow Down"	Lindy Robbins; Julia Michaels; Niles Hollowell-Dhar; David Kuncio; Freddy Wexler	Stars Dance	3:30
10.	"A Year Without Rain" (Dave Audé radio remix)	Toby Gad; Robbins	The Club Remixes, 2011	3:59
11.	"Naturally" (Dave Audé radio remix)	Armato; James; Karaoglu	The Club Remixes	4:01
12.	"Más" (Spanish version of "More")	Isaac Hasson; Robbins; Mher Filian; Mark Portmann^{[a]}; Edgar Cortazar^{[a]}; Ernesto Cortazar^{[a]}	Kiss & Tell^{[b]}	3:30
13.	"Bidi Bidi Bom Bom" (with Selena)	Selena; Pete Astudillo	Enamorada de Ti^{[b]}	4:13
14.	"Falling Down"	Gina Shock; Ted Bruner; Trey Vittetoe	Kiss & Tell	3:03
15.	"Do It"	Gomez; Armato; Jost; James; Thomas Armato Sturges		2:40
Total length:				51:52

For You digital EP track listing
No.	Title	Length
1.	"The Heart Wants What It Wants"	3:47
2.	"Forget Forever" (St£fan remix)	3:46
3.	"Do It"	2:40
4.	"Más" ("More" – Spanish version)	3:30
Total length:		13:43

Notes

- ^{^[a]} signifies a language adapter
- ^{^[b]} these tracks are previously unreleased. The original version appears on a previous release.
- Tracks 3–7, 10–12 and 14 are under the name Selena Gomez & the Scene.
- Digital versions of the album credit Boy Lightning as ST£FAN.
- The iTunes edition includes the bonus music video "The Heart Wants What It Wants".

== Personnel ==
Credits adapted from the album's liner notes

- Selena Gomez – lead vocals (all tracks)
- Steve Hammons – engineering (tracks 1, 3, 4, 6, 11, 15), mix engineering (tracks 1, 3, 6, 15), additional production (track 1)
- Rock Mafia – production & mixing (tracks 1, 3, 6, 15), additional background vocals (track 3)
- Adam Comstock – engineering (tracks 1, 3, 4, 6, 11, 15)
- Tim James – production & mixing (tracks 4, 11), digital editing (track 3), rap (track 4)
- Toby Gad – production, mixing, arrangement, recording & instruments (track 10)
- Devrim Karaoglu – additional production (tracks 1, 6), co-production (tracks 3, 4, 11)
- Serban Ghenea – mixing (tracks 5, 7–9)
- John Hanes – mix engineering (tracks 5, 7–9)
- Dave Audé – remix & additional production (tracks 10, 11)
- Isaac Hasson – programming, guitar, bass & keys (track 12)
- Dubkiller – additional production (tracks 1, 6, 15)
- Nigel Lundemo – engineering (tracks 4, 11), digital editing (track 3)
- Paul Palmer – mixing (tracks 3, 4, 11)
- Mher Filian – programming, beats & keys (track 12)
- Rami Jaffee – vibraphone & mellotron (track 1)
- Tim Pierce – guitar (tracks 3, 4)
- Brooke Adams – additional background vocals (tracks 3, 11)
- Antonina Armato – production (tracks 4, 11)
- Emanuel Kiriakou – production & instruments (track 5)
- Christian Dwiggins – mixdown (tracks 10, 11)
- Dave Dwiggins – mixdown (tracks 10, 11)
- SuperSpy – production & engineering (track 12)
- Clif Norrell – mixing (tracks 12, 14)
- Mark Portmann – language adaptation & recording (track 12)
- Edgar Cortazar – language adaptation & background vocals (track 12)
- Humberto Gatica – production & mixing (track 13)
- Cristian Robles – record engineering & mixing (track 13)
- Favio Esquivel – record engineering assistance & mixing assistance (track 13)
- Ted Bruner – production & engineering (track 14)
- Trey Vittetoe – production & engineering (track 14)
- Chris Gehringer – mastering (track 1)
- Ace Ha – additional production (track 1)
- Xander Singh – additional production (track 1)
- Jon Vella – additional production (track 1)
- Mikkel S. Eriksen – instruments & recording (track 2)
- Stargate – production (track 2)
- Aubry "Big Juice" Delaine – engineering (track 2)
- Phil Tan – mixing (track 2)
- Miles Walker – recording (track 2)
- Tor Erik Hermansen – instruments (track 2)
- Ian Nicol – engineering assistance (track 2)
- Jorge Velasco – engineering assistance (track 2)
- Daniela Rivera – additional engineering assistance (track 2)
- Dreamlab – vocal production (track 2)
- Ester Dean – vocal production (track 2)
- Tim Blacksmith – executive production (track 2)
- Danny D – executive production (track 2)
- Ross Hogarth – engineering (track 3)
- Char Licera – additional background vocals (track 4)
- Sean Hurley – bass (track 4)
- Andrew Goldstein – additional synthesizer (track 5)
- Tim Roberts – assistant mix engineering (track 5)
- Andrew Bolooki – production (track 7)
- Jeff Halatrax – production (track 7)
- Kevin Rudolf – production (track 7)
- Jon Lind – vocal production (track 7)
- Brian Reeves – vocal production (track 7)
- Jason Evigan – production (track 8)
- The Monsters & Strangerz – production (track 8)
- Boy Lightning – remix (track 8)
- Dan Book – additional vocal production (track 8)
- The Cataracs – production (track 9)
- David Kuncio – co-production (track 9)
- Niles Hollowell-Dhar – vocal production (track 9)
- Jimmy Messer – guitar (track 11)
- Ernesto Cortazar – language adaptation (track 12)
- Leyla Hoyle Guerrero – background vocals (track 12)
- Lindy Robbins – background vocals (track 12)
- Selena – vocals (track 13)
- Doug Emery – programming (track 13)
- JoAnn Tominaga – production coordination (track 13)
- Thomas Armato Sturges – additional production (track 15)

Credits

- Robert Vosgien – mastering
- Mio Vukovic – A&R
- Brian Teefey – management
- Mandy Teefey – management
- Ziffren Brittenham, LLP – legal
- Sarah Yeo – A&R coordination
- Lincoln Wheeler – marketing
- Hilary Walsh – photography
- Nick Steinhardt – design

== Charts ==
=== Weekly charts ===
Chart (2014–15)	Peak position
Austrian Albums (Ö3 Austria)	73
Belgian Albums (Ultratop Flanders)	40
Belgian Albums (Ultratop Wallonia)	67
French Albums (SNEP)	80
Greek Albums (IFPI)	32
Irish Albums (IRMA)	95
Italian Albums (FIMI)	34
Norwegian Albums (VG-lista)	37
Scottish Albums (Official Charts)	84
Spanish Albums (Promusicae)	40
UK Albums (Official Charts)	64
US Billboard 200	24

=== Year-end charts ===
Chart (2015)	Position
US Billboard 200	142

== Certifications and sales ==
Region	Certification	Certified units/sales
Brazil (Pro-Música Brasil)	Gold	20,000^{*}
Mexico (AMPROFON)	Gold	30,000^{^}
New Zealand (RMNZ)	Platinum	15,000^{‡}
United Kingdom (BPI)	Gold	100,000^{‡}
United States (RIAA)	Gold	500,000^{‡}
^{*} Sales figures based on certification alone.^{^} Shipments figures based on certification alone.^{‡} Sales+streaming figures based on certification alone.

== Release history ==
Region	Date	Format(s)	Label	Ref.
Czech Republic	November 24, 2014	CD; digital download	Hollywood	
Hungary	November 24, 2014	CD; digital download	Hollywood	
United States	November 24, 2014	CD; digital download	Hollywood	
Brazil	November 25, 2014	CD	Universal	
Australia	November 28, 2014	CD; digital download	Hollywood	
Germany	November 28, 2014	CD; digital download	Hollywood	
France	December 8, 2014	CD; digital download	Hollywood	
United Kingdom	January 26, 2015	CD; digital download	Hollywood	
Japan	March 4, 2015	CD; digital download	Universal	
