= Stars Dance =

Studio album by Selena Gomez
- Released: July 19, 2013
- Recorded: October 2012 – March 2013
- Studios: Conway; Dreamlab; Ekas; Glenwood; the Brain; Kite Music; the Mothership (Los Angeles, California); Rock Mafia (Santa Monica, California); Roc the Mic (New York City); Hide Out (London)
- Genres: EDM; electropop
- Length: 39:07
- Label: Hollywood
- Producers: Dreamlab; Leah Haywood; Mike Del Rio; The Cataracs; Rock Mafia; Stargate; The Monsters & Strangerz; Jason Evigan; Freddy Wexler; Jai Marlon; Partha Ray (Andredi); Toby Gad; JMike; Rob Ghost; Brian Lee; Ammo

Selena Gomez chronology
Stars Dance (2013)	For You (2014)

Singles from Stars Dance
- 1. "Come & Get It" Released: April 7, 2013; 2. "Slow Down" Released: August 13, 2013

Stars Dance is the debut solo studio album by American singer Selena Gomez. It was released on July 19, 2013, by Hollywood Records. Gomez began planning the project in 2012, at which time she announced that her band Selena Gomez & the Scene would be taking an indefinite hiatus, which by 2017 had become a permanent split. Stars Dance is an EDM and electropop album, incorporating elements of dubstep, techno, disco, electro house and worldbeat. Gomez worked on the album through March 2013 with producers such as Rock Mafia and the Cataracs.

Upon its release, Stars Dance received generally mixed reviews from music critics, many of whom complimented Gomez's maturing image and the album's content both lyrically and vocally, but criticized the electronic-heavy production style. It marked her first album to debut at number 1 on the Billboard 200. The album sold 97,000 copies domestically in its first week of release. This achievement was surpassed by its successor, Revival (2015), which sold 117,000 units in its first week. Stars Dance became her fourth Top 20 entry in the United Kingdom, peaking at number 14. Elsewhere, Stars Dance topped the charts in Canada, Norway, Mexico, Taiwan and China. By 2017, the album had sold an estimated 410,000 copies in the United States.

The album's lead single, "Come & Get It" featured heavy electronic and worldbeat themes, and became Gomez's first Top 10 entry in the United States, entering the Top 10 in the United Kingdom, Ireland, and Canada, among others. It was also successful on pop radio, reaching number 2 on the Mainstream Top 40 chart. The second single, "Slow Down", reached the Top 30 in the United States. It was met with success on pop radio, reaching the Top 10 of the Mainstream Top 40 chart. Gomez promoted the album through a number of high-profile performances, such as the 2013 Billboard Music Awards. She embarked on the Stars Dance Tour (2013) to further promote the release.

== Background ==
Selena Gomez & the Scene's third studio album, When the Sun Goes Down (2011), was musically rooted in electropop and dance-pop, similar to the group's second album, A Year Without Rain (2010). Although reviews from contemporary music critics were mixed, the album was a commercial success. In January 2012, Gomez announced that she would put her music career on hold to focus on her acting career, and that the band would be taking a hiatus: "my band and I are going our separate ways for a while. This year is all about films and acting and I want my band to play music wherever with whoever. We will be back but, it will be a good while." Despite her earlier statements, Gomez first confirmed in October 2012 that work had begun on an upcoming album, and later said it would be her solo debut album, rather than her band's fourth album. Gomez announced in March that the album's lead single would be released the following month, and that the album would follow that summer. On April 15, Gomez revealed plans of her first world tour, known as the Stars Dance Tour. Gomez officially confirmed on June 3 that the album would be titled Stars Dance, and also revealed the album's track listing and cover art.

On her return to music, Gomez stated "I miss it. I want to be able to write about things I've never talked about before and tell a story with this album, because I've never actually had time to go in and do that." For the album, Gomez made it with production team The Cataracs, as well as the Norwegian Stargate. Gomez also worked with Rock Mafia on numerous tracks on the album, having previously worked with them on previous singles with The Scene. For Stars Dance, Gomez attempted to have more creative control over her music, stating "It's definitely the hardest I have ever worked on a record, that's for sure. I wanted to have more creative control over the album's direction." Jason Evigan, who worked with Gomez on the album, said "She's not a little girl anymore. She wants to be like that and be respected like the great pop artists out there [...] And I think she is. I think this album is really gonna blossom her into a new realm of electronic pop dance artist." Prior to the album's release, Gomez announced she would be taking a musical hiatus after Stars Dance, commenting "I've been saying that I worked really hard on this record and I feel like it might be my last one for a while [...] I definitely love acting and I love film and I don't feel like I've done enough of that."

Following the album's announcement, numerous sources began claiming that the majority of the album was written about Gomez's relationship with Canadian singer Justin Bieber. These rumors continued to rise in popularity following the release of "Come & Get It", and prompted Gomez to confirm that the song was not about Bieber. She later said, however, that the song "Love Will Remember" is about her relationship with Bieber; an early version that leaked online just prior to the release of the album included a voicemail at the start of the song by Bieber himself that was removed from the final track. She revealed the song was "the most personal track on the record", and added "I think it's a sweet way of releasing it. It's not an aggressive approach to what people are probably expecting. I'm sure he'll love mikey too." The song "Birthday" was the first song recorded for the album. Gomez has listed "Forget Forever" as one of her favorite tracks on the album saying, "It's a really beautiful song. It has meaning behind it and it was a really special time in the studio. I got to be with the writers and just enjoy being in that moment. That was a really fun emotional song for me to sing but then I just kind of wanted to dance after I released it because it felt like I got to release this feeling that I had and it's a beautiful song." She later spoke of "Forget Forever" by stating "It's forgetting all the troubles, about the past, just enjoying everything else." Recording artist Jennifer Lopez wanted to record the song "Save the Day" for her 2013 album, but failed to get it from Gomez. "Come & Get It" was initially recorded by Barbadian recording artist Rihanna for her sixth studio album Talk That Talk (2011), however, she decided against using the song.

== Musical style and themes ==
Musically, Stars Dance is an album rooted stylistically in EDM and pop, this later specifically showcased as electropop while also containing strong elements of dubstep, techno, disco and worldbeat. Jocelyn Vena of MTV News described the music on Stars Dance as "dance-song-heavy" dubstep, that contains "wobbly synths, loopy vocals, fist-pumping beats and crunchy breakdowns". The album contains a highly diverse musical composition, highlighted by Caroline Sullivan of The Guardian as "darting efficiently from EDM to Bollywood". The majority of the album contains dubstep breakdowns, requisite stabs of synths, and according to Jim Farber of New York Daily News, "features a frisson of sex previously absent from this good-girl singer's work." Jason Evigan said of the album's musical style, "She's got some really cool like ethnic influence, kind of tribally dance drums and stuff like that", stating that it was similar to music by Jennifer Lopez. August Brown of the Los Angeles Times called Stars Dance a "sassy" pop-EDM album, noting its composition included "oxygen-sucking" sub-bass, trap snares. Brown noted the influence of Spring Breakers on the album, saying that Gomez wasn't ready to leave the "neon-splattered emotional hellscape of Spring Breakers just yet". He further went on to say: "Stars Dance is exactly the kind of album one makes in 2013 if you want to keep the pop sugar of the Disney tween cabal but mix in some broken glass and a club bathroom nosebleed. Its productions are rooted in today's pop-EDM default mode, but as that stuff goes, 'Slow Down' is pretty capable, and the bhangra-appropriating 'Come & Get It' is guilelessly silly enough to work."

"I made a huge fun dance record that I'm so proud of. I got to [...] work with a bunch of different producers and they're all really fun, pop songs and a little Ellie Goulding-ish, a little island-y feel, It's a really fun pop record."

— Gomez, on the album's composition and style.

The album's title track was described by Gomez as being "kind of sensual", while "Like a Champion" is said to feature Jamaican and reggae influences. When talking about the song "Save the Day", Gomez stated "Do you ever have moments where you don't ever want them to end? I've had those moments. It's about saving those moments and never wanting it to go away." The song "Write Your Name" is about the feeling of falling in love. Gomez described B.E.A.T. by saying "The song is cool and the lyrics are great, but it was more, 'I can't wait to perform this song onstage because I love the way I feel when I hear this song.' It's just dope." Gomez later stated that "Undercover" was her favorite song on the album, commenting "I've never had the confidence to do different licks and melody changes. I messed up a lot [while recording] that one." The album's lead single, "Come & Get It", has been described as featuring "Bollywood" influences, as well as tribal music.

On-air personality Peter Dee noted that the song featured various electropop elements. "Slow Down" is noted as featuring various dubstep influences, while the song's lyrics speak of taking a relationship slowly rather than rushing into things. Gomez has listed Britney Spears and Janet Jackson as some of the album's biggest influences, and later cited Skrillex, Taylor Swift, and Christina Aguilera as major influences on the record. She listed dubstep producer Skrillex as an influence to the album, with him having previously worked on the soundtrack for Gomez's film Spring Breakers. She later stated "Doing Spring Breakers was really fun, because Skrillex and Cliff Martinez did the soundtrack, and [Skrillex] kind of inspired me with a baby dubstep, because I have a few songs that have that." In an interview with Teen Vogue, Gomez mentioned electropop singer-songwriter Ellie Goulding, while she described the sound of the record, stating: "they are all really fun, pop songs-a little Ellie Goulding-ish, a little island-y feel. It's a really fun pop record." Jim Farber of New York Daily News noted influences of Spears, Jennifer Lopez, and Janet Jackson, although going on to say "Gomez's writer and producers have aped other stars' tricks gamely enough to create a pretty good time. It helps that Gomez boasts a far richer voice than her idols, Britney, J.Lo and Janet."

== Songs and lyrical content ==
The album opens with "Birthday", an electropunk song which contains sparse drums, trap snares and vocal chants and has been described by Julia Rubin of Headlines and Global News as a "candy-coated, clap-happy club anthem with plenty of girl power and sex appeal, much like a bubblegum version of Rihanna's 'Cockiness (Love It)'." "Slow Down" is a high-octane, uptempo dance-pop and EDM song, that has been described as "wobbly club thumper" by Robert Copsey of Digital Spy. It features a dubstep chorus, funk guitars, a four on the floor beat, and a spoken word outro. Lyrically, the song speaks of "slowing down the song" so the party doesn't end. "Stars Dance", the album's title track, is a "breathy and sultry" dubstep song, which contains an orchestral-dubstep beat. According to Rubin, "Gomez's soft voice takes center stage over sexy synth-beats, icy choruses and wallowing melodies." "Stars Dance" has also received comparisons to the works of Britney Spears. "Like a Champion" is a dancehall song, with influences of funk, reggae, and soca music, and features Gomez singing the song in a Bajan accent. The song has received heavy comparisons to the works of Rihanna, with critics noting the song's breezy and carefree vocal delivery. "Come & Get It" is a tribal electropop and popstep song, which contains a Bhangra beat, sonic drops, and influences of Indian music. Lyrically, the song is about female lover's attempts to rekindle a previously ended romance.

"Forget Forever" is a dance-pop and synthpop song which contains an EDM beat and house music breakdowns. Lyrically, the song is about a breakup. Sam Lansky of Idolator said the song is an "electrifying dance-pop banger with a monolithically great chorus and a storming, anthemic beat, plus a big house break." Nate Jones of Popdust called the song "bright and expansive", going onto say that Gomez's vocals "fly over an EDM beat that can't help getting us ready for summer." "Save the Day" is a "thumping" Latin pop and house music song "B.E.A.T." is a "sexy" urban hip-hop song described by Jon O'Brien of Yahoo! Music as "minimal spoken word electro". Christina Drill of Popdust said the song was "infectious and definitely racier than usual for Selena (the chorus: 'It's a big bad world but I'm not ashamed / I like the lights in my hand and the beat in my face')". "Write Your Name" has been described as an "exotic" sounding electronic dance and house music song. The song contains a rap verse by Gomez, as well as elements of dubstep. O'Brien of Yahoo! Music said that: "Forget Forever' and 'Write Your Name' both manage to tiptoe into 'hands in the air' territory without succumbing to the usual Guetta-style bombast."

== Promotion ==
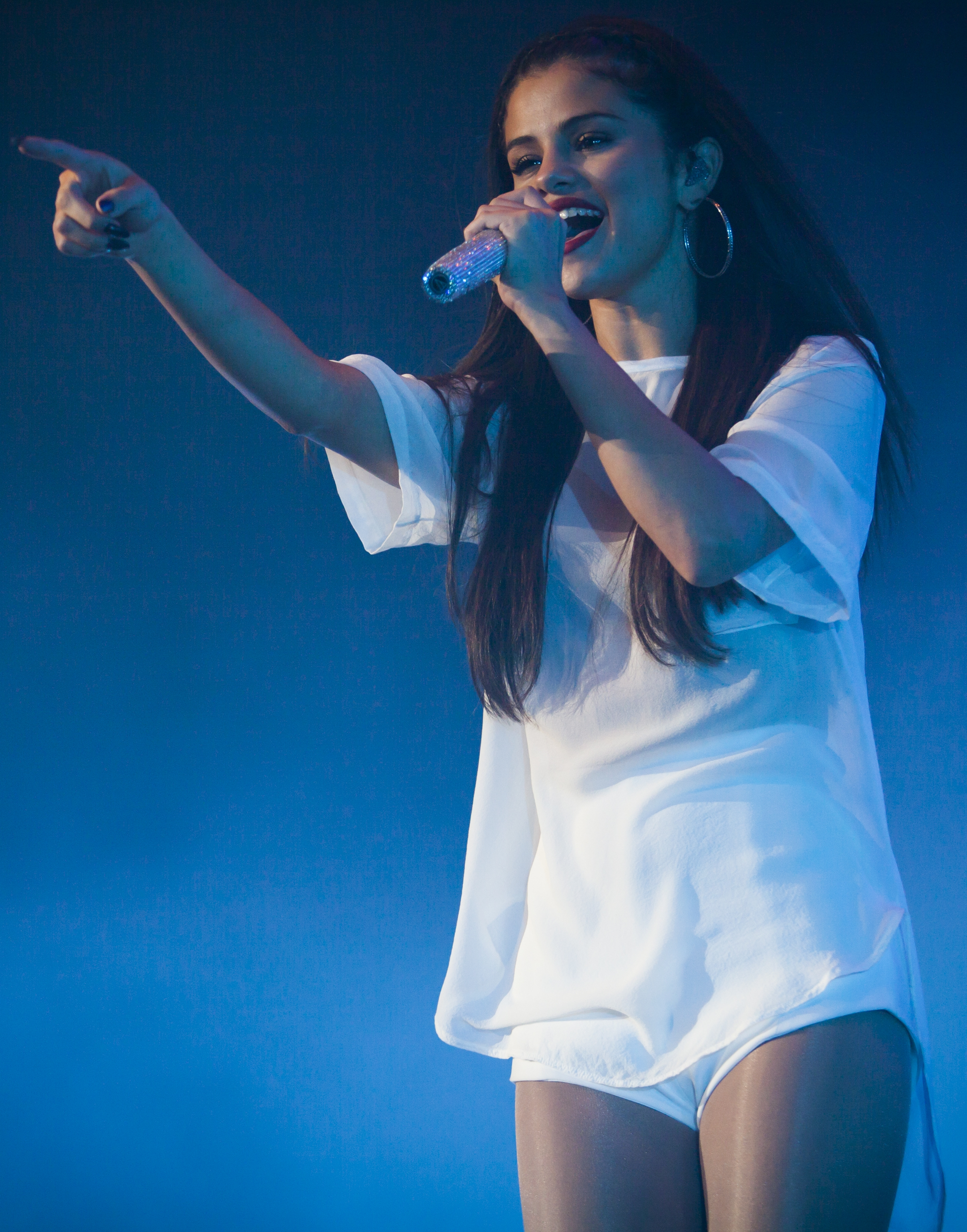
Gomez performing on the Stars Dance Tour (2013).

Gomez promoted the album through a number of interviews and televised live performances. She appeared on On Air with Ryan Seacrest on April 8, 2013, to promote "Come & Get It". She gave her first televised performance of the song at the 2013 MTV Movie Awards on April 14, 2013. The appearance saw Gomez in an "all-red, 'earthy'" outfit, and received a generally positive reception. She appeared on Dancing with the Stars on April 16 to perform "Come & Get It". On April 18, she performed the song again on The Ellen Degeneres Show. Gomez donned a bindi for these performances, and later came under fire by the Universal Society of Hinduism for her use of the religious symbol. Gomez appeared on The Late Show with David Letterman on April 25, where she performed "Come & Get It". On April 27, she performed the song yet again at the 2013 Radio Disney Music Awards. She did not perform the song again until May 19, when she performed at the 2013 Billboard Music Awards. Days later, she performed "Come & Get It" on The Graham Norton Show.

Gomez appeared at the MuchMusic Headquarters on May 30, where she performed "Slow Down" for the first time. On July 4, Gomez performed both "Come & Get It" and "Slow Down" at the Macy's 4th of July Fireworks Spectacular. Gomez appeared on This Morning in the United Kingdom to perform "Come & Get It". To coincide with the release of Stars Dance, Gomez performed "Come & Get It", "Slow Down", and "Birthday" on Good Morning America. In September, Gomez appeared on Live! With Kelly and Michael to perform "Birthday". Following the release of "Slow Down", Gomez appeared on The View to perform the song. She performed the song again on The Late Show with David Letterman. She performed "Slow Down" on The X Factor in the United States. Gomez was selected to be the halftime performer during the Dallas Cowboys vs. Oakland Raiders game held on Thanksgiving. For the show, Gomez performed a medley of "Like a Champion", "Slow Down", and "Come & Get It". The tour was further promoted through her worldwide Stars Dance Tour (2013), which visited countries such as the United States and Asia. The tour became making over $36 million at the box office. Originally meant to feature dates in Australia and Japan, the tour was cancelled due to personal issues.

== Singles ==
"Come & Get It", was released as the lead single from the album on April 7, 2013. As of July 2013, the song became one of Gomez's most successful singles, peaking at number 6 of the US Billboard Hot 100 and the Canadian Hot 100 as well as being certified 3× Platinum by the RIAA. The music video premiered on MTV on May 7, 2013 and was directed by Anthony Mandler.

"Slow Down", was released as a promomotinal single on June 3, 2013. via an instant digital download with the pre-order of the album on iTunes, and was co-produced by The Cataracs and David Kuncio. It was later released as the album's official second single on August 13, 2013. It peaked at number 27 on the Billboard Hot 100. The official video was uploaded to YouTube on July 19, 2013.

== Critical reception ==
Professional ratings
Aggregate scores
Source	Rating
AnyDecentMusic?	4.3/10
Metacritic	59/100
Review scores
Source	Rating
AllMusic	3.5/5 stars
Billboard	4/5 stars
The Guardian	3/5 stars
The Independent	1/5 stars
Los Angeles Times	2.5/4 stars
The Observer	2/5 stars
Rolling Stone	3/5 stars
Slant Magazine	1/5 stars

Stars Dance received mixed reviews from music critics. Positive remarks went toward the overall production of the album, as well as its lyrics and Gomez's vocals. Mixed reviews went towards her inability to create her own musical identity; she was compared to singer Rihanna on several occasions. At Metacritic, which assigns a normalized rating out of 100 to reviews from critics, the album received an average score of 59, which indicates "mixed or average reviews". Tim Sendra from Allmusic awarded the album three-and-a-half stars out of five. As he pointed out "Slow Down", "Save the Day" and "Undercover" as highlights, he said "Selena's reliably strong vocals and the variety of sounds, it adds up to be another fine entry in her catalog and just another example of why Selena Gomez is one of the best pop stars making music in 2013." Stephen Unwin from Express.co.uk compared the new effort to Vanessa Hudgens and said "Both [Gomez and Hudgens] have now turned their attention to themes of a more adult nature, this new album of Selena's being one of them and she's just about pulled it off."

Two Guardian reviews were issued. The first, observed by Kitty Empire, awarded the album three stars out of five. Conversely, the second Guardian review, observed by Hermione Hoby, was mixed and awarded it two stars out of five. She clarified that "if she really wants to be considered a grown-up pop star, Selena Gomez is going to have to find some better hit-makers." She compared the work, including "Like a Champion", to Rihanna. August Brown from the Los Angeles Times found that the album was "the kind of album one makes in 2013 if you want to keep the pop sugar of the Disney tween cabal but mix in some broken glass and a club bathroom nosebleed. Its productions are rooted in today's pop-EDM default mode [...]" Natalie Palmer from Entertainmentwise took perspective of other critics and commentators, saying the album should have been praised for "trying something new". She discussed "'Stars Dance' isn't what you would expect from a girl who was once a Disney princess. Many often go for the bubblegum pop or the angry rock chick but the 21-year-old has opted for an edgier genre and a unique sound."

Matthew Horton from Virgin Media awarded the album two stars. He criticized her "lack of personality" in most songs and felt her vocal abilities on the album "doesn't help". He concluded saying "It's all too identikit, [and] could be anyone with a grasp of average dance-pop". Simon Price from The Independent awarded one star out of the five, criticizing the lack of effort saying that "Even given these facts, it's a pop record, which means one killer track would redeem everything. Predictably enough, it never comes." Ron Harris from The Huffington Post felt the album did not live up to expectations, citing Gomez as a "vibrant young woman of Disney pedigree [who] simply punched the clock and worked through an already cooked musical plot foisted upon her. Gomez might be an incredibly talented and interesting person with much to offer artistically, but we'll never find out at this rate." He also found the album to have less personality than her previous records with The Scene.

== Commercial performance ==
Stars Dance debuted at number one on the Billboard 200, selling 97,000 copies in its first week of release. This made it Gomez's first album to reach the top of the chart, as well as her highest first sales week for an album, until surpassed by her second release Revival, which sold 117,000 its first week. The album fell to number eight on the chart during its second week, selling an additional 31,000 copies. These sales were a 68% drop from the previous week's sales. In its third week, the album fell to number thirteen. The album continued to decline on the chart the following week, landing at number eighteen. In its fifth week, the album fell to number twenty-five. The album rose to number twenty-four on the chart following this. Following this rise, the album had a 23% increase in sales, selling 17,213 copies and reaching number twenty-one. Despite this, the album dropped to number thirty-three the following week, selling just over 7,000 copies. Stars Dance spent a total of twenty-five weeks on the Billboard 200, with its last appearance being on the week ending January 25, 2014.

The album debuted at number one on the Canadian Albums Chart, with sales of 16,500 copies in its first week. It was her first number one in the country, and sold more than 5,000 in its first week than her previous effort. On August 27, 2013, the album received a Gold certification from the CRIA, for sales exceeding 40,000. Stars Dance had its first chart entry on the New Zealand Albums Chart, entering in the top five at number five itself. In the United Kingdom, the album debuted and peaked at number fourteen; it spent a total of four weeks on the chart. It peaked at number nine in Ireland, and spent a total of six weeks on the chart. The record peaked at number eight in Australia. The album was more successful in international territories. In Mexico, the album debuted at number one on the Mexican Albums Chart, and later went on to be certified Gold in the country for selling 30,000 copies. Stars Dance reached number two in Portugal, and was certified Platinum in the country. The album peaked at number eight in Brazil, and also received a Platinum certification in the country.

== Track listing ==
Credits adapted from the album's liner notes

Stars Dance track listing
No.	Title	Writer(s)	Producer(s)	Length
1.	"Birthday"	Crista Russo; Mike Del Rio; Jacob Kasher Hindlin	Del Rio; Matt Beckley^{[b]}	3:21
2.	"Slow Down"	Lindy Robbins; Julia Michaels; Niles Hollowell-Dhar; David Kuncio; Freddy Wexler	The Cataracs; Hollowell-Dhar^{[b]}; Kuncio^{[c]}	3:30
3.	"Stars Dance"	Antonina Armato; Tim James; Adam Schmalholz	Rock Mafia; Dubkiller^{[d]}; Steve Hammons^{[d]}	3:37
4.	"Like a Champion"	Dan James; Leah Haywood; Peter Thomas; Bebe Rexha; Mark Myrie; Leroy Sibbles	Dreamlab^{[a]}; Thomas^{[c]}	2:56
5.	"Come & Get It"	Ester Dean; M.S. Eriksen; T.E. Hermansen	Stargate; Dreamlab^{[b]}; Dean^{[b]}; Tim Blacksmith^{[e]}; Danny D^{[e]}	3:51
6.	"Forget Forever"	Jason Evigan; Clarence Coffee; Alexander Izquierdo; Jordan Johnson; Stefan Johnson; Marcus Lomax	The Monsters & Strangerz; Evigan; Dan Book^{[f]}	4:11
7.	"Save the Day"	Mitch Allan; Evigan; Livvi Franc	The Suspex	3:52
8.	"B.E.A.T."	Wexler; Jai Marlon; Heather Jeanette Miley	Wexler^{[a]}; Marlon; Partha Ray (Andredi)	3:04
9.	"Write Your Name"	D. James; Haywood; Arnthor Birgisson	Dreamlab	3:16
10.	"Undercover"	Hollowell-Dhar; Robbins; Michaels; Rome Ramirez	The Cataracs; Hollowell-Dhar^{[b]}	3:53
11.	"Love Will Remember"	Armato; Desmond Child; David Jost; T. James	Rock Mafia; Dubkiller^{[d]}	3:30
Total length:				39:07

Digital edition bonus tracks
No.	Title	Writer(s)	Producer(s)	Length
12.	"Nobody Does It Like You"	Toby Gad; Robbins; Selena Gomez	Gad; Afsheen^{[d]}	3:56
13.	"Music Feels Better"	Gomez; D. James; Haywood; Jeremy Coleman	JMike; Dreamlab; Rob Ghost	3:10
Total length:				46:14

US Target and international physical deluxe edition bonus tracks
No.	Title	Writer(s)	Producer(s)	Length
14.	"Lover in Me"	Gomez; D. James; Haywood; Brian Lee; Stuart Crichton	Dreamlab; Lee	3:29
15.	"I Like It That Way"	Joshua Coleman; Hindlin; Rickard Göransson; Max Borghetti; Fransisca Hall; Saul Alexander Castillo Vasquez	Ammo; Beckley^{[b]}; A.C.^{[d]}; Max Borghetti^{[d]}	4:16
Total length:				53:54

Notes

- ^{^[a]} signifies a producer and vocal producer
- ^{^[b]} signifies a vocal producer
- ^{^[c]} signifies a co-producer
- ^{^[d]} signifies an additional producer
- ^{^[e]} signifies an executive producer
- ^{^[f]} signifies an additional vocal producer
- The Amazon MP3 digital edition includes the bonus remix track "Come & Get It" (DJ Laszlo Club Remix).
- The Overseas special digital edition includes the bonus remix track "Come & Get It" (Cosmic Dawn Club Mix).
- The US Walmart edition includes a bonus DVD which features Selena Gomez live at Walmart Soundcheck.
- The Japanese digital edition includes the bonus remix track "Come & Get It" (Dave Audé Radio Remix), while the Japanese physical edition replaces the bonus track with "Come & Get It (Jump Smokers Radio Remix)" that also appears on the Japanese deluxe edition.
- The Japanese deluxe edition also includes a bonus DVD which features the music videos of all singles, and a track by track interview.

Sampling credits

- "Like a Champion" samples the composition entitled "Champion" by Buju Banton.
- "Come & Get It" samples "Dachee" by Bollywood Sounds.
- "Nobody Does It Like You" samples elements of "Hello" by Martin Solveig.

== Personnel ==
- Selena Gomez – lead vocals (all tracks)
- John Hanes – mix engineering (tracks 1, 2, 4, 6–10)
- Serban Ghenea – mixing (tracks 1, 2, 4, 6–10)
- Rock Mafia – production (tracks 3, 11), mixing (track 3), guitar, piano, percussion & background vocals (track 11)
- Dreamlab – production (tracks 4, 9, 13, 14), vocal production (tracks 4, 5), vocal engineering (track 8)
- Rob Ghost – engineering assistance (tracks 4, 9), mixing (tracks 13, 14), production (track 13)
- Matt Beckley – vocal production (tracks 1, 15), engineering & mixing (track 15)
- Simon French – engineering assistance (tracks 4, 13, 14), studio assistance (track 9)
- Joe Pringle – engineering assistance (tracks 9, 13, 14), studio assistance (track 4)
- Mike Del Rio – production, programming & additional vocals (track 1)
- Steve Hammons – engineering (tracks 3, 11), additional production (track 3)
- Freddy Wexler – production, vocal production & background vocals (track 8)
- Toby Gad – production, programming & mixing (track 12)
- Ammo – production, programming & instruments (track 15)
- A.C. – additional production, programming & instruments (track 15)
- Jonathan Sher – engineering (tracks 1, 15)
- The Cataracs – production (tracks 2, 10)
- Niles Hollowell-Dhar – vocal production (tracks 2, 10)
- Adam Comstock – engineering (tracks 3, 11)
- Dubkiller – additional production (tracks 3, 11)
- Phil Tan – mixing (tracks 5, 11)
- Daniela Rivera – additional engineering assistance (tracks 5, 11)
- Jason Evigan – production (tracks 6, 7)
- Afsheen – additional production & additional arrangement (track 12)
- Crista Russo – additional vocals (track 1)
- David Kuncio – co-production (track 2)
- Cameron Stone – cello (track 3)
- Peter Thomas – co-production (track 4)
- Stargate – production (track 5)
- Danny D – executive production (track 5)
- Max Borghetti – additional production, programming & instruments (track 15)
- Tim Blacksmith – executive production (track 5)
- Aubry "Big Juice" Delaine – engineering (track 5)
- Ester Dean – vocal production (track 5)
- Mikkel S. Eriksen – instruments (track 5)
- Tor Erik Hermansen – instruments (track 5)
- Jorge Velasco – engineering assistance (track 5)
- Ian Nicol – engineering assistance (track 5)
- The Monsters & Strangerz – production (track 6)
- Dan Book – additional vocal production (track 6)
- Mitch Allan – production (track 7)
- Livvi Franc – background vocals (track 7)
- Jai Marlon – production (track 8)
- Daniel Glashausser – engineering (track 8)
- Partha Ray – additional drum programming (track 8)
- Rome Ramirez – guitar (track 10)
- Aaron Dudley – guitar (track 11)
- JMike – production (track 13)
- Brian Lee – production (track 14)
- Daniel James – mixing (track 14)

Credits

- Chris Gehringer – mastering
- Mio Vukovic – A&R
- Sarah Yeo – A&R [Coordination]
- Jeri Heiden – Art Direction
- Dave Snow – Creative Director
- Nick Steinhardt – Design
- Brian Teefey – Management
- Mandy Teefey – Management
- Lincoln Wheeler – Management [Marketing]
- Diego Uchitel – Photography By

== Charts ==
=== Weekly charts ===
Weekly chart performance for Stars Dance
Chart (2013)	Peak position
Argentine Albums (CAPIF)	2
Australian Albums (ARIA)	8
Austrian Albums (Ö3 Austria)	6
Belgian Albums (Ultratop Flanders)	5
Belgian Albums (Ultratop Wallonia)	10
Brazilian Albums (Billboard)	8
Canadian Albums (Billboard)	1
Chinese Albums (Sino)	1
Croatian International Albums (HDU)	3
Czech Albums (ČNS IFPI)	2
Danish Albums (Hitlisten)	2
Dutch Albums (Album Top 100)	10
Finnish Albums (Suomen virallinen lista)	17
French Albums (SNEP)	12
German Albums (Offizielle Top 100)	4
Greek Albums (IFPI)	8
Hungarian Albums (MAHASZ)	16
Irish Albums (IRMA)	9
Italian Albums (FIMI)	4
Mexican Albums (Top 100)	1
New Zealand Albums (RMNZ)	5
Norwegian Albums (VG-lista)	1
Polish Albums (ZPAV)	5
Portuguese Albums (AFP)	2
Scottish Albums (Official Charts)	14
Spanish Albums (Promusicae)	4
Swedish Albums (Sverigetopplistan)	46
Swiss Albums (Schweizer Hitparade)	6
Swiss Albums (Romandie)	9
Taiwanese International Albums (G-Music)	1
UK Albums (Official Charts)	14
US Billboard 200	1

=== Year-end charts ===
2013 year-end chart performance for Stars Dance
Chart (2013)	Position
Argentine Albums (CAPIF)	33
Canadian Albums (Billboard)	42
Belgian Albums (Ultratop Flanders)	62
Belgian Albums (Ultratop Wallonia)	76
French Albums (SNEP)	148
Greek Albums (IFPI)	8
Mexican Albums (AMPROFON)	85
US Billboard 200	101

== Certifications and sales ==
Certifications and sales for Stars Dance
Region	Certification	Certified units/sales
Argentina (CAPIF)	Gold	20,000^{^}
Canada (Music Canada)	Gold	40,000^{^}
Colombia	Gold	
Mexico (AMPROFON)	Platinum	60,000^{^}
New Zealand (RMNZ)	Gold	7,500^{‡}
Portugal (AFP)	Platinum	15,000^{^}
United States (RIAA)	Gold	500,000^{‡}
^{^} Shipments figures based on certification alone.^{‡} Sales+streaming figures based on certification alone.

== Release history ==
Release dates for Stars Dance
Region	Date	Format	Label
Netherlands	July 19, 2013	CD; digital download	Universal
Germany	July 19, 2013	CD; digital download	Universal
Singapore (SG)	July 19, 2013	CD; digital download	Hollywood
Mexico	July 22, 2013	CD; digital download	Hollywood
Spain	July 22, 2013	CD; digital download	Hollywood
United Kingdom	July 22, 2013	CD; digital download	Hollywood
Middle East	July 22, 2013	CD; digital download	Hollywood
France	July 22, 2013	CD; digital download	Hollywood
United States	July 23, 2013	CD; digital download	Hollywood
Italy	July 23, 2013	CD; digital download	Hollywood
Israel	July 24, 2013	CD; digital download	Helicon
Brazil	July 26, 2013	CD deluxe	Universal
Japan	September 25, 2013	CD; digital download	Avex Marketing
China	October 27, 2013	CD	Starsing Culture

== See also ==
- List of Billboard 200 number-one albums of 2013
