= Aadnevik =

British luxury fashion brand

AADNEVIK

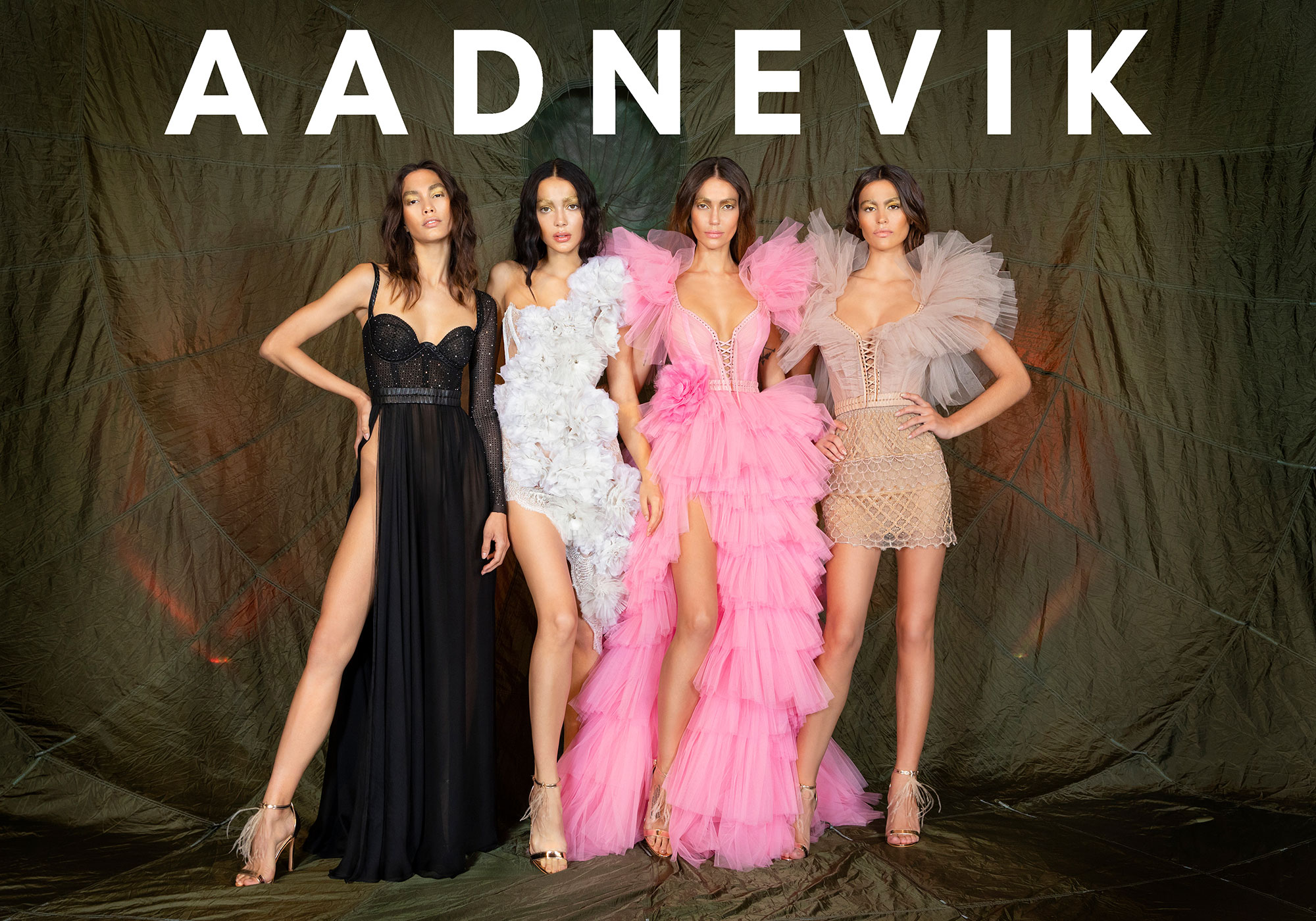
- AADNEVIK Summer 2022 Collection
- Type: Privately held company
- Industry: Fashion
- Founded: 2013
- Founder: Hila Aadnevik, Kristian Aadnevik
- Headquarters: Knightsbridge, London
- Products: Ready-to-wear and Couture
- Website: www.aadnevik.com

AADNEVIK (stylized in caps) is a British luxury fashion brand. The brand provides haute couture, ready-to-wear clothes, bridal clothing, loungewear and fashion accessories. It was founded in 2013 by Hila and Kristian Aadnevik, and is based in Knightsbridge, London.

== History ==
London-based Norwegian fashion designer Kristian Aadnevik established a self-titled label in 2004, which is distinct from AADNEVIK. Kristian ceased operations of the "Kristian Aadnevik" brand in 2013 and launched the new brand "Aadnevik" after meeting his wife, Hila. The couple met in London in 2012, where Kristian was studying womenswear at the Royal College of Art. Hila is a self-taught designer.

Their first collection, titled "Moth" was inspired by the appearance of moths and their cocoons.

The label has been featured several times at London Fashion Week. At London Fashion Week 2019, Aadnevik unveiled a collection inspired by Leo Tolstoy’s novel Anna Karenina.

In October 2020, the National Museum in Oslo, Norway purchased one of the brand’s designs for its fashion collection, which went on display in Spring 2021. In 2020, the brand announced its luxury loungewear line.

AADNEVIK has designed and provided clothing for numerous celebrities including Beyonce, Madonna, Kendall Jenner, Halle Berry, and international stars such as Malaika Arora, Anushka Sharma, and Priyanka Chopra. One of AADNEVIK's designs was featured in Selena Gomez's music videos for the song "Come and Get It", and another in the "Rare" video.

In September 2022, AADNEVIK presented at the London Fashion Week. The brand’s 2022 Autumn/Winter collection, titled “Wolf Moon” was inspired by Norse mythology.

AADNEVIK was also featured in the 72nd issue of London Runway magazine, published in 2022.

Models such as Marianne Fonseca, Amelia Gray Hamlin, and Maya Henry have walked the catwalk for AADNEVIK.
