= Stars Dance Tour =

2013–14 concert tour by Selena Gomez

- Tour by Selena Gomez
- Promotional poster for the tour
- Location: Asia; Europe; North America
- Associated album: Stars Dance
- Start date: August 14, 2013
- End date: March 9, 2014
- Legs: 3
- No. of shows: 58
- Supporting acts: Emblem3; Christina Grimmie; Anton Ewald; Timeflies; The Vamps; Union J; Xuso Jones; Karl Wolf; James David
- Attendance: 393,716 (54 shows)
- Box office: $35.3 million ($48.79 million in 2025 dollars)

Selena Gomez concert chronology
- Stars Dance Tour (2013–2014); Revival Tour (2016)

The Stars Dance Tour was the first solo concert tour by American singer Selena Gomez, in support of her solo debut studio album, Stars Dance (2013). Gomez performed songs from her solo debut album, as well as her releases with Selena Gomez & the Scene. The tour was officially announced on April 15, 2013, and launched on August 14, 2013, at the Rogers Arena in Vancouver, Western Canada, and concluded on March 9, 2014, at the NRG Stadium in Houston, Texas, visiting cities in North America, and it serves as the first tour of Gomez's career, visiting Europe and Dubai, throughout 58 dates. The cancellation of The Stars Dance Tour in Asia and Australia was caused due to Gomez's diagnosis with Lupus in 2013, an auto-immune disease leading to high anxiety and depression.

The Stars Dance Tour was attended by 393,716 people and grossed $35.3 million from 54 shows, making this tour the biggest of her career that time.

== Development ==
On April 15, 2013, Gomez announced that she would be touring North America and Europe along with one show in Asia from August to November in support of her album Stars Dance. When asked about the tour, Gomez stated:

"It's going to be a bigger show. I'm excited. I've been dancing a lot and I just want to entertain people and I'm super stoked." Gomez further added: "I kind of missed shows when it used to just be about the dancing and the performing as opposed to how big and elaborate the stage is so I kind of want to get back to that. My favorites were Britney Spears and Janet Jackson so I kind of want it to be a bit more dancing and make it about entertainment and about the show and the songs as opposed to how big the stage and effects are."

It was announced later that the tour would continue throughout Asia and Australia but in December 2013 Gomez released a statement saying that she decided to cancel the tour. Gomez stated:

"My fans are so important to me and I would never want to disappoint them. But it has become clear to me and those close to me that after many years of putting my work first, I need to spend some time on myself in order to be the best person I can be. To my fans, I sincerely apologize and I hope you guys know how much each and every one of you mean to me."

== Concert synopsis ==
The show begins with a video showing stars in outer space. The camera begins to zoom in on earth and down into a house where Gomez has fallen asleep after looking at star charts. The video then fades out to white, enlarges Gomez's face and shows her looking around at 4 mysterious doors that have appeared around here. She enters one containing stairs that lead to the stage and the real Gomez appears at the top of the real staircase in the center of the stage, performing "Bang Bang Bang" and dressed in white. After singing "Round & Round", Gomez welcomes everyone to the show and asks the audience for help singing the next song, "Like A Champion". Next, Gomez and her dancers perform a mashup of "B.E.A.T." and "Work" before exiting the stage.

A video interlude then plays, showing her entering another door that contains a video projector that begins to countdown. Gomez re-enters the stage wearing a sparkly, blue two-piece outfit to perform "Stars Dance". "Write Your Name" is next, during which the dancers form a heart of neon glow sticks around Gomez. After the song, Gomez asks the audience if anyone is celebrating a birthday by performing a medley of "Birthday" and Rihanna's "Birthday Cake". The lights go down as she slowly begins "Love You Like A Love Song" before the lights come up at the chorus and the song is performed at normal speed. Gomez then leaves the stage.

Another video interlude shows Gomez entering another door, this one containing potted trees and flowers, and a gift box at the end on a pedestal. She opens the gift box to reveal the sparkly microphone with her name on it that she always performs with. Camera flashes and news headlines appear, symbolizing the exposure and interest in Gomez's personal life. She returns to the stage in a black dress to perform "Love Will Remember". Next, Gomez sings a cover of "Dream" by Priscilla Ahn, while playing the harmonica. After a speech telling the audience to accept themselves for who they are and not to change for anyone, Gomez performs "Who Says" before leaving the stage.

The third video interlude shows Gomez opening the final door, which leads into a club. "Whiplash" begins to play before Gomez re-enters the stage in a sparkly, gold one-piece outfit. She and her dancers hang around on suspended ropes during the performance. As the lights fade, they return to focus on Gomez as she begins to sing "Naturally". "Undercover" is next, with resonating sound waves displayed on the screen. A disco remix version of "A Year Without Rain" is also performed in select cities. Gomez then leaves the stage once more.

A final video clip displays Gomez sleeping at the desk again after looking at star charts. She awakes to reveal that the whole thing was a just a dream. "Come & Get It" begins to play before the real Gomez enters. After the song, she exits the stage again, only to re-enter to perform "Slow Down" as the music video plays in the background on the screen. Pink confetti blows out into the audience during the final chorus. She runs out onto the runway to acknowledge and thank the fans for coming to the show. She acknowledges the band and dancers before she runs to the top of the stage and makes her exit offstage as the music ends.

== Set list ==
=== North America (Leg 1) and Europe (Leg 2) ===
1. "Bang Bang Bang"
2. "Round & Round"
3. "Like a Champion"
4. "B.E.A.T." (contains elements of "Work")
5. "Stars Dance"
6. "Write Your Name"
7. "Birthday" / "Birthday Cake"
8. "Love You like a Love Song"
9. "Love Will Remember"
10. "Dream"
11. “Royals”
12. "Who Says"
13. "Whiplash"
14. "Naturally"
15. “Save The Day”
16. "Undercover"
17. "A Year Without Rain"

Encore

18. "Come & Get It"
19. "Slow Down"

=== North America (Leg 3) ===
This set list is representative of the Los Angeles concert on November 6, 2013. It does not represent all concerts for the duration of the tour.

1. "Bang Bang Bang"
2. "Round & Round"
3. "Like a Champion"
4. "B.E.A.T." (contains elements of "Work")
5. "Stars Dance"
6. "Write Your Name"
7. "Birthday" / "Birthday Cake"
8. "Roar"
9. "Love You like a Love Song"
10. "Love Will Remember"
11. "Dream"
12. "Who Says"
13. "Whiplash"
14. "Naturally"
15. “Save The Day”
16. "Undercover"

Encore

17. "Come & Get It"
18. "Slow Down"

== Tour dates ==
List of 2013 concerts
Date (2013)	City	Country	Venue	Opening acts	Attendance	Revenue
August 14	Vancouver	Canada	Rogers Arena	Emblem3; Christina Grimmie	—N/a	—N/a
August 16	Lethbridge	Canada	ENMAX Centre	Emblem3; Christina Grimmie	—N/a	—N/a
August 17	Edmonton	Canada	Rexall Place	Emblem3; Christina Grimmie	—N/a	—N/a
August 18	Saskatoon	Canada	Credit Union Centre	Emblem3; Christina Grimmie	—N/a	—N/a
August 19	Winnipeg	Canada	MTS Centre	Emblem3; Christina Grimmie	—N/a	—N/a
August 22	Ottawa	Canada	Canadian Tire Centre	Emblem3; Christina Grimmie	—N/a	—N/a
August 23	Montreal	Canada	Bell Centre	Emblem3; Christina Grimmie	9,236 / 9,236	$575,936
August 24	Toronto	Canada	Air Canada Centre	Emblem3; Christina Grimmie	12,668 / 12,668	$745,501
August 30	Frederiksberg (Note: Frederiksberg is part of the Copenhagen region.)	Denmark	Falkoner Teatret	—N/a	—N/a	—N/a
August 31	Stockholm	Sweden	Fryshuset	Anton Ewald	—N/a	—N/a
September 1	Oslo	Norway	Oslo Spektrum	—N/a	—N/a	—N/a
September 3	Amsterdam	Netherlands	Heineken Music Hall	Timeflies	—N/a	—N/a
September 4	Antwerp	Belgium	Lotto Arena	Timeflies	—N/a	—N/a
September 5	Paris	France	Zénith Paris	Timeflies	—N/a	—N/a
September 7	London	England	Eventim Apollo	The Vamps	—N/a	—N/a
September 8	London	England	Eventim Apollo	The Vamps	—N/a	—N/a
September 11	Lisbon	Portugal	Campo Pequeno	Union J	—N/a	—N/a
September 12	Madrid	Spain	Palacio Vistalegre	Xuso Jones	—N/a	—N/a
September 14	Frankfurt	Germany	Jahrhunderthalle	—N/a	—N/a	—N/a
September 16	Milan	Italy	Discoteca Alcatraz	—N/a	3,256 / 3,256	$123,410
September 17	Vienna	Austria	Wiener Stadthalle	—N/a	—N/a	—N/a
September 27 (Note: The September 27, 2013 concert in Dubai, United Arab Emirates was a part of the 2013 Dubai Music Week.)	Dubai	United Arab Emirates	Trade Centre Arena	—N/a	—N/a	—N/a
October 10	Fairfax (Note: Labelled as Washington, D.C. in promotional material)	United States	Patriot Center	Emblem3; Christina Grimmie; James David	—N/a	—N/a
October 11	Pittsburgh	United States	Petersen Events Center	Emblem3; Christina Grimmie; James David	—N/a	—N/a
October 12	Boston	United States	TD Garden	Emblem3; Christina Grimmie; James David	—N/a	—N/a
October 15	Buffalo	United States	First Niagara Center	Emblem3; Christina Grimmie; James David	—N/a	—N/a
October 16	New York City (Note: Labelled as Brooklyn in promotional material)	United States	Barclays Center	Emblem3; Christina Grimmie; James David	11,175 / 12,873	$575,636
October 18	Philadelphia	United States	Wells Fargo Center	Emblem3; Christina Grimmie; James David	11,905 / 11,905	$583,662
October 19	Uncasville	United States	Mohegan Sun Arena	Emblem3; Christina Grimmie; James David	7,043 / 7,043	$379,408
October 20	Newark	United States	Prudential Center	Emblem3; Christina Grimmie; James David	12,126 / 12,126	$600,324
October 22	Hershey	United States	Giant Center	Emblem3; Christina Grimmie; James David	—N/a	—N/a
October 23	Louisville	United States	KFC Yum! Center	Emblem3; Christina Grimmie; James David	5,081 / 6,360	$256,742
October 25	Nashville	United States	Bridgestone Arena	Emblem3; Christina Grimmie; James David	6,428 / 7,674	$315,208
October 26	Atlanta	United States	Philips Arena	Emblem3; Christina Grimmie; James David	9,173 / 9,173	$431,834
October 27	Charlotte	United States	Time Warner Cable Arena	Emblem3; Christina Grimmie; James David	—N/a	—N/a
October 29	Sunrise (Note: Labelled as Miami in promotional material)	United States	BB&T Center	Emblem3; Christina Grimmie; James David	—N/a	—N/a
October 30	Tampa	United States	Tampa Bay Times Forum	Emblem3; Christina Grimmie; James David	—N/a	—N/a
November 1	San Antonio	United States	AT&T Center	Emblem3; Christina Grimmie; James David	—N/a	—N/a
November 2	Houston	United States	Toyota Center	Emblem3; Christina Grimmie; James David	—N/a	—N/a
November 3	Dallas	United States	American Airlines Center	Emblem3; Christina Grimmie; James David	—N/a	—N/a
November 5	Phoenix	United States	U.S. Airways Center	Emblem3; Christina Grimmie; James David	—N/a	—N/a
November 6	Los Angeles	United States	Staples Center	Emblem3; Christina Grimmie; James David	13,855 / 13,855	$626,246
November 8	San Diego	United States	Valley View Casino Center	Emblem3; Christina Grimmie; James David	—N/a	—N/a
November 9	Las Vegas	United States	Mandalay Bay Events Center	Emblem3; Christina Grimmie; James David	—N/a	—N/a
November 10	San Jose (Note: Labelled as San Francisco in promotional material)	United States	HP Pavilion	Emblem3; Christina Grimmie; James David	—N/a	—N/a
November 12	Seattle	United States	KeyArena	Emblem3; Christina Grimmie; James David	—N/a	—N/a
November 14	Salt Lake City	United States	EnergySolutions Arena	Emblem3; Christina Grimmie; James David	—N/a	—N/a
November 16	Broomfield (Note: Labelled as Denver in promotional material)	United States	1stBank Center	Emblem3; Christina Grimmie; James David	—N/a	—N/a
November 17	Kansas City	United States	Sprint Center	Emblem3; Christina Grimmie; James David	6,774 / 8,362	$331,286
November 18	St. Louis	United States	Chaifetz Arena	Emblem3; Christina Grimmie; James David	—N/a	—N/a
November 19	Indianapolis	United States	Bankers Life Fieldhouse	Emblem3; Christina Grimmie; James David	—N/a	—N/a
November 21	Minneapolis	United States	Target Center	Emblem3; Christina Grimmie; James David	7,248 / 7,248	$320,470
November 22	Rosemont (Note: Labelled as Chicago in promotional material)	United States	Allstate Arena	Emblem3; Christina Grimmie; James David	—N/a	—N/a
November 23	Columbus	United States	Nationwide Arena	Emblem3; Christina Grimmie; James David	—N/a	—N/a
November 26	Auburn Hills	United States	The Palace of Auburn Hills	Emblem3; Christina Grimmie; James David	10,240 / 10,240	$469,452

List of 2014 concerts
Date (2014)	City	Country	Venue	Opening acts	Attendance	Revenue
March 8 (Note: The show on March 8, 2014 was a part of Borderfest 2014.)	Hidalgo	United States	State Farm Arena	—N/a	—N/a	—N/a
March 9 (Note: This show on March 9, 2014 was a part of Houston Rodeo 2014.)	Houston	United States	NRG Stadium	—N/a	—N/a	—N/a
Total					126,208 / 132,019 (96%)	$6,335,115

=== Cancelled shows ===
List of cancelled concerts, showing date, city, country, venue and reason for cancellation
Date	City	Country	Venue	Reason
September 19, 2013	Minsk	Belarus	Minsk-Arena	Unknown
September 21, 2013	Kyiv	Ukraine	Palace of Sports	Unknown
September 23, 2013	St. Petersburg	Russia	Ice Palace	Denied visa
September 25, 2013	Moscow	Russia	Olimpiyskiy	Denied visa
January 16, 2014	Tokyo	Japan	Zepp Tokyo	Personal issues
January 17, 2014	Tokyo	Japan	Zepp Tokyo	Personal issues
January 20, 2014	Osaka	Japan	Namba Hatch	Personal issues
January 24, 2014	Shanghai	China	Shanghai International Gymnastic Center	Personal issues
January 26, 2014	Kuala Lumpur	Malaysia	Stadium Merdeka	Personal issues
January 27, 2014	Singapore		Star Performing Arts Centre	Personal issues
January 29, 2014	Quezon City (Note: Labelled as Manila in promotional material)	Philippines	Smart Araneta Coliseum	Personal issues
February 1, 2014	Perth	Australia	Perth Arena	Personal issues
February 4, 2014	Adelaide	Australia	Adelaide Entertainment Centre	Personal issues
February 6, 2014	Brisbane	Australia	BCEC Great Hall	Personal issues
February 7, 2014	Sydney	Australia	Sydney Entertainment Centre	Personal issues
February 8, 2014	Melbourne	Australia	Rod Laver Arena	Personal issues
