= Come & Get It (Selena Gomez song) =

2013 single by Selena Gomez

Single by Selena Gomez

from the album Stars Dance
- Released: April 7, 2013
- Studio: Roc the Mic (New York City); Hide Out (London); Ekas; Glenwood (Los Angeles, California)
- Genre: Electropop; bhangra; dance-pop; dubstep; power pop
- Length: 3:51
- Label: Hollywood
- Songwriters: Ester Dean; Mikkel S. Eriksen; Tor Erik Hermansen
- Producer: Stargate

Selena Gomez singles chronology
"Tell Me Something I Don't Know" (2008)	"Come & Get It" (2013)	"Slow Down" (2013)

Music video
- "Come & Get It" on YouTube

"Come & Get It" is a song recorded by American singer Selena Gomez for her debut solo studio album, Stars Dance (2013). It was released as the album's lead single on April 7, 2013, through Hollywood Records, and served as her first official release outside of either her acting work or her former band, Selena Gomez & the Scene. The song was written by Norwegian production team Stargate, consisting of Mikkel S. Eriksen and Tor Erik Hermansen, along with Ester Dean. Eriksen and Hermansen handled the tracks production, while Dean served as the vocal producer. The song was one of the last songs to be recorded for the album in early 2013. "Come & Get It" features a change in style from Gomez's previous releases, and features elements of electropop, dance-pop and Punjabi music.

Music critics mostly praised the song for its tabla beat and its Bollywood themes. In the United States, the single became her first top ten entry on the Billboard Hot 100 chart (topped at position No. 6), and was certified quintuple platinum by the Recording Industry Association of America (RIAA). Additionally, it peaked at number two on the Mainstream Top 40 chart. It became her second top ten single in both Canada and the United Kingdom, and was certified multi-platinum in the former. It also reached the top ten in Brazil, Ireland, Lebanon, and Turkey. The music video for "Come & Get It" was released on May 7. The song and its video received several awards and nominations, including at the 2013 MTV Video Music Awards.

Gomez performed "Come & Get It" at a number of awards shows and televised events, with its first performance being at the 2013 MTV Movie Awards. She opted to incorporate choreography into performances of the song, inspired by artists such as Britney Spears. During its initial promotional run, Gomez came under fire from religious groups for donning a bindi during performances of the song. The single was performed during the encore of her worldwide Stars Dance Tour (2013–14). Gomez performed the song on numerous occasions while promoting her second studio album, Revival (2015). The song is featured on Gomez's first compilation album, For You (2014), which served as her final release through Hollywood Records.

== Background and release ==
Norwegian producers Mikkel S. Eriksen and Tor Erik Hermansen, better known as Stargate, both produced and wrote the song along with Ester Dean. Dean recorded a demo of the song, which was originally written for inclusion on Barbadian artist Rihanna's sixth studio album, Talk That Talk (2011). Rihanna ultimately decided not to record the song, thus it was given to Gomez for inclusion on Stars Dance. Gomez later spoke to Billboard on the collaboration with the trio, claiming "I'm a huge Stargate fan – I think their beats and what they produce is just gold [...] And Ester Dean is just an incredible vocalist that a lot of people know, but if you actually hear her voice just solely on her own, it's just stunning, and it's really haunting." "Come & Get It" was one of the last songs to be recorded for the album, which was completed in February 2013. While recording the song, Gomez knew she wanted it to be the lead single, stating "I just remember recording it and being in the studio and just thinking of how the place I was in and what I was going through and I was just so excited about it and I wanted it to be the first single." Gomez shared a similar sentiment in a later interview as well, adding "The reason I wanted it to be the first single was because radiates, as I said before, trust and out and that's something I'm willing to share with the world. This is the place I want to be and want to represent something good and be a good example, so I think it's fun."

Prior to the announcement of the single, it was speculated that Gomez had collaborated with her friend Taylor Swift on the lead single to her upcoming album; Gomez denied this. Gomez first announced "Come & Get It" in March 2013, and confirmed an April 8, 2013 release date. Following the announcement, pieces of the song's single cover began being posted on Gomez's official website and social media; the cover was released in full on March 27. Philippe Bond and David Bond, also known as The Blonds, designed the costumes and clothing adorned by Gomez for the cover of the single. The pair stated "Working with Selena Gomez and her stylist Basia Richards is always an amazing experience [...] Selena's style is what The Blonds are all about. It's daring, glamorous, and always fun!" She later uploaded an eleven-second teaser for the song on April 1, with yet another teaser following on April 4. "Come & Get It" was leaked online on April 6, leading to the track being released for digital download a day prior to what was initially planned. On Air with Ryan Seacrest later began streaming the song earlier than initially planned due to the unexpected leak. Gomez released an extended play featuring six remixes of the song to digital retailers on May 28, 2013.

== Production and lyrics ==
"Come & Get It"
A sample from "Come & Get It" which shows the tabla sound and bhangra influences presents in the song, the chorus also is heard, where Gomez sing repeatedly the hook in the end of each line.

"Come & Get It" is an electropop, dance-pop and bhangra song that lasts for a total of three minutes and fifty-one seconds. The song is composed in the key of G minor and features a moderate tempo of 80 beats per minute. Gomez's vocal range spans from the low tone of F_{3} to the high note of D_{5}. The song opens with a "Bollywood inspired" theme, before transitioning into a more dubstep influenced sound. Gomez said the song was inspired by works from pop singer Britney Spears and Skrillex, the latter of which worked on the soundtrack to the film Spring Breakers (2013), starring Gomez. Lewis Corner of Digital Spy said the song featured a "dirty, fuzzy bassline" and "grinding beats and one-night-stand synths" before comparing it to recent releases by Rihanna. MTV also compared it to work by Rihanna and stated the song was a "whirling mix of tablas and robo-vocals." Jody Rosen of Rolling Stone said the song was an "unimpeachably catchy big-pop stomp, with come-hither lyrics and a string of moody vocal hooks."

The song helped Gomez develop a more mature image than she had in the past. Gomez stated that she had hoped to "create something fun, sassy, and playful, but unexpected" with the song. Lyrically, the song speaks of Gomez's desire to rekindle a former romance, claiming she is willing when he is ready to "come & get it".

== Controversy ==
"Come & Get It" drew some criticism from listeners, some of whom found the song to be anti-feminist. New Zealand recording artist Lorde praised the song "on a sonic level", but added "I'm a feminist and the theme of her song is, 'When you're ready come and get it from me.' I'm sick of women being portrayed this way." Songwriter Amy S. Foster felt similarly, adding "It's not the idea that she is having sex, or singing about sex or wearing sexy clothes that bothers me. It's the fact that she sings quite proudly about being a total doormat with the notion that THAT is sexy."

== Critical reception ==
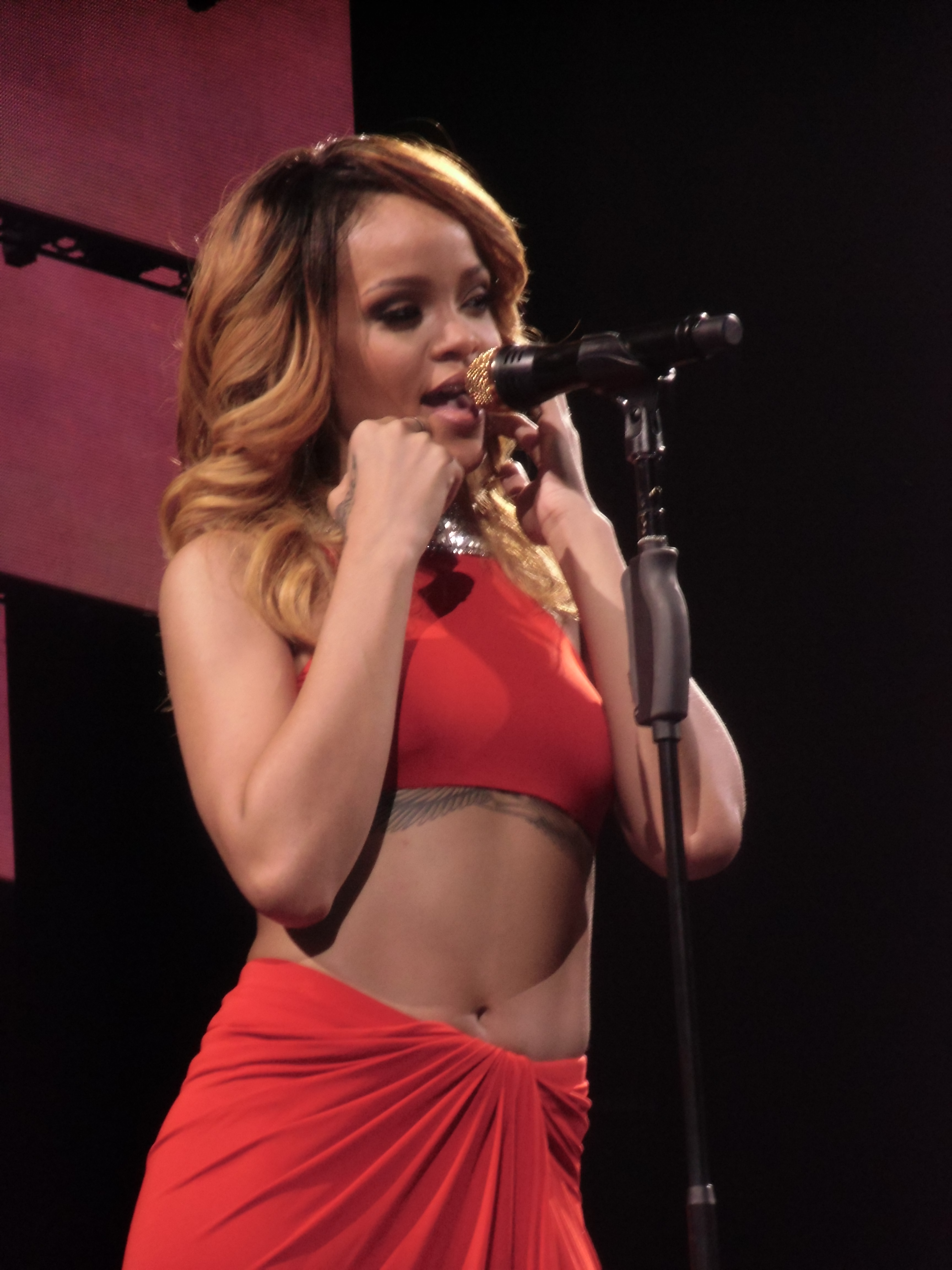
"Come & Get It" was compared to recent releases by Barbadian singer Rihanna (pictured), who was offered the song before Gomez.

Kyle Anderson of Entertainment Weekly described it as "an easy, breezy tune with an ambling melody and a hint of reggae lilt." Bradley Stern of MuuMuse.com also praised the song, stating that "'Come & Get It' is fairly monotone, but repeat listens reveal the song's infectiousness: The chorus – especially with that stuttered chant at the end – is pure sticky pop goodness, the stomping beat is smutty enough to inspire a sick strut, and that whirring Bollywood-meets-tribal-electro synth sound lends itself well to some grind-up-against-the-wall make-out action up in the club." Lewis Corner of Digital Spy wrote, "As the bhangra music-inspired intro merges into a dirty, fuzzy bassline, it's clear from the off Selena has ditched the pop sheen she has become known for." Corner later gave the song three out of five stars. Jody Rosen of Rolling Stone gave the song three and a half stars, writing, "Call it Gomez's Justin Bieber breakup song if you want. The more accurate description, though, is 'Rihanna-wannabe anthem.' Stargate and Ester Dean, the team behind some of Rih's biggest smashes, have given Gomez the good stuff" Newsday gave Stars Dance a somewhat negative review, though listed "Come & Get It" and "Slow Down" as highlights of the project. AllMusic praised the song and stated that "the tablas add a nice mystical touch" to the track. The Boston Globe praised the song in their review of Stars Dance, and positively compared it to releases from Rihanna. Caroline Sullivan of The Guardian praised the song, and compared it to releases from Miley Cyrus. Sputnikmusic praised the "bass drop" in the song, and listed "Come & Get It" and "Birthday" as the highlights of the album.

Common Sense Media gave the song two stars, claiming that "While the beats are infectious, Gomez just doesn't have the vocal chops to hold up during the verses, and mostly just sounds sleepy." Billboard gave the track a mixed review, and negatively compared it to her prior single "Love You like a Love Song" (2011). Slant Magazine criticized both the song and its parent album, even accusing Gomez of cultural appropriation, claiming "The tabla-infused lead single 'Come and Get It' exhibits similar issues, emptying its Indian influences of any apparent meaning by treating them as mere sonic decoration." The Los Angeles Times wrote "[Stars Dance's] productions are rooted in today's pop-EDM default mode, but as that stuff goes, 'Slow Down' is pretty capable, and the bhangra-appropriating 'Come & Get It' is guilelessly silly enough to work." Ron Harris with Yahoo! Music gave Stars Dance a negative review, though wrote that "Gomez's lead single and Billboard top 10 hit, the catchy "Come & Get It," is about the best offering here, thanks to Stargate's club-heavy beat."

== Chart performance ==
"Come & Get It" sold a total 115,000 copies in its week of release, causing it to debut at number seventeen on the Billboard Bubbling Under Hot 100 chart in the United States. The following week it sold 76,088 copies, debuting at number forty-five on the Billboard Hot 100 chart for the week ending April 14, 2013. The next week it rose to number twenty-two on the chart, selling over 98,000 copies for the week. The single fell one spot on the Hot 100 the following, though rose to number fourteen the week after, aided by an increase in sales and the release of its music video. It sold just under 115,000 copies for that week, bringing its total sales to over 400,000 in the United States. One week later it rose again to a new peak of number six on the Hot 100, boasting sales of 143,000 copies and a 264% in overall streaming. This made "Come & Get It" Gomez's highest-charting song in the United States at the time, and was the first top ten hit of her career. Despite falling one spot the week after, it rose number six on the chart for a second time after selling 171,000 downloads for the week. This made it the highest sales week for the single at the time. It sold 157,000 copies the following week, bringing it sales to over one million copies.

The song continued to rise in streaming in the following weeks, while consistent sales helped it remain in the top ten for several weeks. It remained on the Hot 100 for a total of twenty-two weeks, becoming her most successful single in the United States at the time. The song debuted at number thirty-seven on the Hot Dance Club Songs chart, and went on to become her fifth single to top the chart. It did so in only its fifth week of release, becoming the quickest song to top the chart since Madonna's single "Music" (2000). "Come & Get It" became Gomez's biggest hit on radio at the time of its release, reaching number two on the Mainstream Top 40 chart and number twenty-nine on the Rhythmic chart. The song later appeared at number thirty-three on the Hot 100 chart for the end of the year. It was reported in May 2017 that "Come & Get It" had sold 2.6 million copies in the United States, receiving a triple platinum certification from the Recording Industry Association of America (RIAA) based on sales and streaming. In Canada, the song debuted at number ninety-three on the Canadian Hot 100. The song gradually continued to rise on the chart, eventually reaching a peak of number six on the chart. This made it her second top ten hit in the country, following "Love You like a Love Song" (2011). It remained in the top ten of the chart for eight consecutive weeks, and spent a total of twenty-three weeks in the Hot 100. It ranked number thirty-six on the year end chart in Canada. The song was certified multi platinum in the country, denoting sales of 160,000 copies. The song remained tied with "The Heart Wants What It Wants" (2014) and "Same Old Love" (2015) as her highest-charting song in the country, until her 2016 single "Hands To Myself" charted higher, reaching number five on the chart.

In Australia, the single debuted at number seventy-two on the ARIA Charts. It eventually climbed to a peak of number forty-six in the country, spending twenty weeks on the official singles chart. It sold over 35,000 copies in the country, earning a gold certification from the Australian Recording Industry Association (ARIA). The song became her second top twenty hit in New Zealand, where it peaked at number fourteen, and earned a gold certification. In the United Kingdom, "Come & Get It" sold over 36,000 copies in its debut week, entering at number eight on the official singles chart in the country. This made it her first song to enter the top ten since "Naturally" (2010). Despite remaining in the top ten the following week, "Come & Get It" quickly declined down the chart, spending a total of eight weeks on the singles chart. The song has sold over 120,000 copies in the country. Much like in the United Kingdom, the song entered the top ten in both Ireland and Scotland, though quickly fell off the charts. The song had similar success in countries such as Denmark and Norway, earning a gold and platinum certification in the countries, respectively.

== Music video ==
=== Production ===
The accompanying video for "Come & Get It" was directed by Anthony Mandler, a frequent collaborator with Rihanna, Lana Del Rey and Taylor Swift. It was filmed in March 2013 at Tejon Ranch in Tejon, California and some another scenes were filmed in Los Angeles, California. The song's radio version was used in the music video. The video features a recurring theme of the classical elements, being air, earth, fire, and water. Prior to its release, Gomez referred to "Come & Get It" as being her best video thus far. Gomez and Mandler hoped for the clothing in the clip to be "sensual" in nature, with Gomez selecting the black corset dress used during a scene in the music video. The dress was designed by Aadnevik.

She later added "And that [black] dress was actually a last-minute dress because I was wanting it to be more long-sleeved. But with the field and everything and the setting, [Mandler] wanted it to be a little more sensual. I get it: it's a beautiful dress and I definitely love the pop with my hair." Gomez released a teaser for the video on April 30, showing the singer in a large field surrounded by flowers, looking longingly at a mysterious man, plunging into a river, and performing a choreographed dance routine with a group of dancers in front of a fire. The music video for the song premiered on May 7, 2013, on MTV. Gomez participated in an interview following the release of the video, with the clip being released onto Vevo and iTunes around thirty minutes later.

=== Synopsis ===
Gomez performing a choreographed dance routine dressed in a red chiffon Marco Marco throughout the music video of the song. A similar dress was also used by Gomez during her performance on 2013 MTV Movie Awards.

The music video opens with a shot of Gomez looking into the camera, before panning over a field of mountains and blue flowers where Gomez can be seen laying. Images of Gomez dancing in front of a fire and seducing a man are interspersed between shots of an eagle, thunder, and waves of the ocean. Gomez is again shown lying in the field as the camera zooms out, and an oncoming storm is shown. Once the music begins to play, a number of Indian men are seen playing the tabla. Wearing a red chiffon Marco Marco ensemble with sleeves and a flowing bottom, Gomez begins to perform a choreographed dance routine with several backup dancers. The group perform the routine in front of a large fire, symbolizing the fire portion of the classical elements. Gomez begins to sing and roam through the field in a black corset dress. She is then seen in the same field with a wall of mirrors, and begins to dance and pose in the mirrors while the sun reflects off of the glass.

She is again shown flirting with the mysterious man, who is never directly shown though only seen in glimpses. Gomez can next be seen running to a large area covered in boulders, symbolizing the earth portion of the elements. For this scene, Gomez dons a long, sleeveless white dress with a plunging neckline. The dress features multiple layers, with Gomez shaking the dress and her hair with the wind. With the beginning of the second verse, Gomez can be seen sticking her head out from a body of water, thus symbolizing the element of water. A seemingly topless Gomez sings the song while remaining in the water, before floating down the stream. She can later be seen completely submerged in the water, looking off into the distance as pieces of a long dress she is wearing float around her. While Gomez completes the choreography with her dancers, the music ends. Selena is then seen swaying in the field as the storm passes on.

== Live performances ==
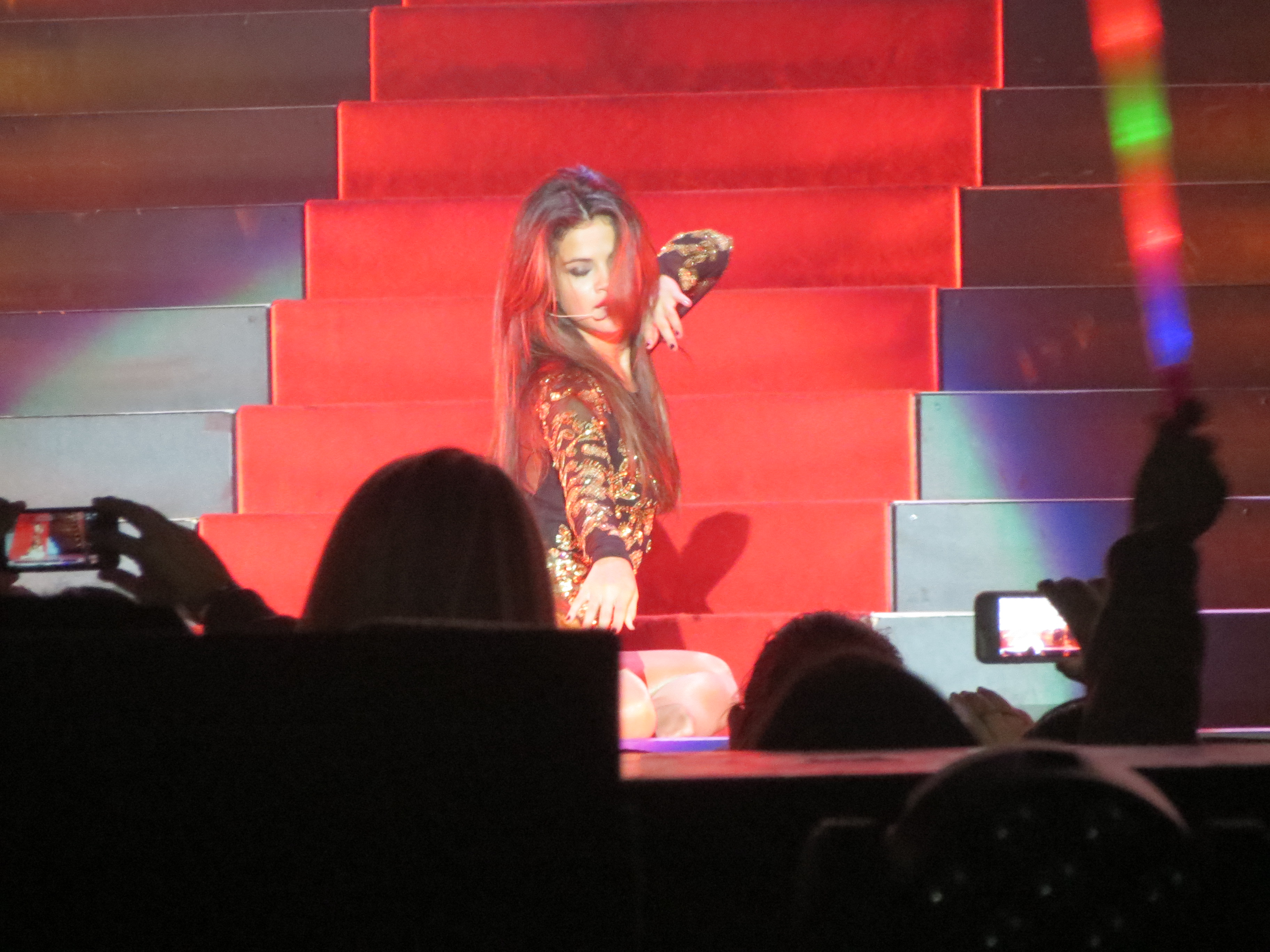
Gomez performing "Come & Get It" on her Stars Dance Tour.

Gomez performed "Come & Get It" for the first time at the 2013 MTV Movie Awards on April 14, 2013. During the performance, Gomez performed the choreography from the song's music video, citing artists such as Britney Spears as an influence on her performance. The performance was praised by critics, with MTV writing "Selena's new single is a confident mantra, and her "Come & Get It" Movie Awards performance saw the singer making good use of her husky alto while tackling complex Bollywood-inspired choreography for a more mature moment that felt less Disney schoolgirl and more tempting seductress." Spears herself also praised the performance. Gomez made her network television premiere of the song on the April 16 episode of The Ellen Degeneres Show. That night, Gomez performed the song on Dancing with the Stars, using the same choreography as her MTV Movie Awards performance. During these performances, Gomez donned a bindi, and later came under fire for her use of the religious symbol. Hindu statesman Rajan Zed claimed "[The bindi] is also sometimes referred to as the third eye and the flame, and it is an auspicious religious and spiritual symbol... It is not meant to be thrown around loosely for seductive effects or as a fashion accessory aiming at mercantile greed." Gomez defended her decision to wear the bindi, claiming "I think the song has that Hindu, tribal feel and I wanted to translate that. I’ve been learning about my chakra and bindis and the culture — it's beautiful."

On April 24, Gomez appeared on the Late Show With David Letterman where she again performed the song. She later performed both "Come & Get It" and "Love You like a Love Song" on MTV Upfronts. On April 27, Gomez performed the song at the 2013 Radio Disney Music Awards, continuing to use the choreography and wear the bindi during the performance. The performance was praised by the media, with Hollywood Life writing "In a blue-hued checker dress that seemed to be made partly out of party streamers and a brand new bindi (because a girl can never own too many bindis), Selena owned the stage while tons of fans screamed along in awe." On May 19, 2013, she performed the song at the 2013 Billboard Music Awards. Of the performance, MTV wrote "Gomez was the first performer of the night, setting the tone. She kept the Bollywood theme of her MTV Movie Awards performance in a flowy dress with a gold metal bustier and bindi, sensually dancing to her latest single." During a promotional press tour in the United Kingdom, Gomez appeared on The Graham Norton Show, her first European performance of the song. Gomez appeared on the Macy's 4th of July Fireworks, where she performed both "Come & Get It" and "Slow Down". "Come & Get It" was one of five songs performed by Gomez for Walmart Soundcheck, with the performances being included as bonus tracks on the Walmart deluxe edition of Stars Dance.

Gomez was one of several artists to perform at the iHeartRadio Coca-Cola Summer Concert Series, where she performed "Come & Get It" along with other songs from the album. On July 17, Gomez appeared on the United Kingdom television program This Morning. To promote the release of the album, Gomez performed "Come & Get It" along with "Birthday" and "Slow Down" on Good Morning America on July 26. The performance aired as part of the show's annual summer concert series. The song was featured in the encore of Gomez's Stars Dance Tour, which launched in Vancouver on August 14, 2013. She continued the choreographed routine for performances of the track during the tour, with Idolator writing "She tapped into the song's middle eastern flavor with the choreography and reminded everyone why it was one of the best songs of the summer." "Come & Get It" was once more performed on November 28 during the Dallas Cowboys Thanksgiving Halftime Show. Gomez performed the song as the final portion of a medley featuring "Like a Champion" and "Slow Down". The song was added to the set list of Gomez's iHeartRadio Jingle Ball performances, along with four other songs. Gomez performed the songs using a hand-held microphone in a red "floor-length, lacy gown". On October 12, 2015, Gomez performed "Come & Get It" for the first time in over a year while promoting her second studio album, Revival (2015). The performance saw Gomez singing a remixed version of the song as part of a medley with "Me & the Rhythm". A remixed version was also performed on Gomez's Revival Tour in 2016.

== Awards and nominations ==
Year	Award	Category	Result	Ref.
2013	Capricho Awards	Best Clip	Nominated	
2013	Billboard.com Mid-Year Music Awards	Best Music Video	Nominated	
2013	MTV Video Music Awards	Best Pop Video	Won	
2013	MTV Video Music Awards	Song of Summer	Nominated	
2013	Teen Choice Awards	Choice Music Single: Female Artist	Nominated	
2013	Teen Choice Awards	Choice Break-Up Song	Won	
2013	World Music Awards	World's Best Song	Nominated	
2013	World Music Awards	World's Best Music Video	Nominated	
2013	YouTube Music Awards	Video of the Year	Nominated	
2014	ASCAP Pop Music Awards	Most Performed Songs	Won	
2014	BMI Pop Awards	Award Winning Songs	Won	
2014	iHeartRadio Much Music Video Awards	Best International Artist Video	Nominated	
2014	Radio Disney Music Awards	Song of the Year	Won	

== Track listing ==
Digital download
No.	Title	Writer(s)	Producer(s)	Length
1.	"Come & Get It"	Ester Dean; M.S. Eriksen; T.E. Hermansen	Stargate; Dreamlab^{[a]}; Dean^{[a]}; Tim Blacksmith^{[b]}; Danny D^{[b]}	3:51
Total length:				3:51

Digital remixes
No.	Title	Length
1.	"Come & Get It" (Jump Smokers Extended Remix)	4:13
2.	"Come & Get It" (Robert DeLong Remix)	4:36
3.	"Come & Get It" (Cahill Club Remix)	7:05
4.	"Come & Get It" (Fred Falke Club Remix)	8:35
5.	"Come & Get It" (DJ M3 Mixshadow Extended Remix)	5:31
6.	"Come & Get It" (Dave Audé Club Remix)	6:11
Total length:		36:12

Notes

- ^{^[a]} signifies a vocal producer
- ^{^[b]} signifies an executive producer

== Credits and personnel ==
Credits and personnel adapted from Stars Dance liner notes.

Recording and management

- Recorded at Roc the Mic Studios (New York City) and Hide Out Studios (London)
- Vocals recorded at Ekas Studios and Glenwood Studios (Los Angeles, California)
- Mixed at Ninja Beat Club (Atlanta, Georgia)
- Mastered at Sterling Sound (New York City)
- Published by Songs of Universal, Inc./Dat Damn Dean Music (BMI) and EMI April Music Inc. on behalf of EMI Music Publishing Ltd. (ASCAP)

Personnel

- Selena Gomez – vocals
- Ester Dean – songwriting, vocal production
- Stargate – songwriting, production for 45th & 3rd Music LLC, all instruments, production, recording for 45th & 3rd Music LLC
- Aubry "Big Juice" Delaine – engineering
- Ian Nicol – assistant
- Miles Walker – recording for 45th & 3rd Music LLC
- Mr. Clarke – recording
- Dreamlab – vocal production
- Jorge Velasco – assistant engineering
- Phil Tan – mixing
- Daniela Rivera – additional engineering, assistant engineering
- Tim Blacksmith – executive producer
- Danny D – executive producer
- Chris Gehringer – mastering

== Charts ==
=== Weekly charts ===
Chart (2013)	Peak position
Australia (ARIA)	46
Austria (Ö3 Austria Top 40)	53
Belgium (Ultratip Bubbling Under Flanders)	2
Belgium (Ultratop 50 Wallonia)	15
Brazil (Billboard Brasil Hot 100)	4
Brazil Hot Pop Songs	15
Canada Hot 100 (Billboard)	6
CIS Airplay (TopHit)	12
Czech Republic Airplay (ČNS IFPI)	22
Denmark (Tracklisten)	34
Finland (MixRadio)	28
France (SNEP)	34
Germany (GfK)	58
Hungary (Rádiós Top 40)	28
Ireland (IRMA)	6
Italy (FIMI)	66
Lebanon (Lebanese Top 20)	9
Mexico (Billboard Mexican Airplay)	13
Mexico (Billboard Ingles Airplay)	1
Mexico Anglo (Monitor Latino)	6
Netherlands (Single Top 100)	84
New Zealand (Recorded Music NZ)	14
Norway (VG-lista)	16
Romania (Airplay 100)	45
Russia Airplay (TopHit)	16
Scottish Singles Sales (Official Charts)	6
Slovakia Airplay (ČNS IFPI)	37
South Korea (Gaon International Chart)	37
Spain (Promusicae)	40
Switzerland (Schweizer Hitparade)	42
Turkey (Turkish Singles Chart)	5
UK Singles (Official Charts)	8
Ukraine Airplay (TopHit)	49
US Billboard Hot 100	6
US Adult Contemporary (Billboard)	27
US Adult Pop Airplay (Billboard)	17
US Dance Club Songs (Billboard)	1
US Latin Pop Airplay (Billboard)	29
US Pop Airplay (Billboard)	2
US Rhythmic Airplay (Billboard)	29
Venezuela Pop/Rock General (Record Report)	4

=== Year-end charts ===
Chart (2013)	Position
Belgium (Ultratop Wallonia)	86
Canada (Canadian Hot 100)	36
France (SNEP)	112
Russia Airplay (TopHit)	138
Ukraine Airplay (TopHit)	99
UK Singles (Official Charts Company)	144
US Billboard Hot 100	33
US Mainstream Top 40 (Billboard)	20

== Certifications ==
Region	Certification	Certified units/sales
Australia (ARIA)	2× Platinum	140,000^{‡}
Brazil (Pro-Música Brasil)	3× Platinum	180,000^{‡}
Canada (Music Canada)	2× Platinum	160,000^{*}
Mexico (AMPROFON)	Gold	30,000^{*}
New Zealand (RMNZ)	Platinum	15,000^{*}
Norway (IFPI Norway)	Gold	5,000^{*}
Sweden (GLF)	Gold	20,000^{‡}
United Kingdom (BPI)	Gold	400,000^{‡}
United States (RIAA)	5× Platinum	5,000,000^{‡}
Streaming
Denmark (IFPI Danmark)	Gold	900,000^{†}
Norway (IFPI Norway)	Platinum	3,000,000^{†}
^{*} Sales figures based on certification alone.^{‡} Sales+streaming figures based on certification alone.^{†} Streaming-only figures based on certification alone.

== Release history ==
Region	Date	Format	Label	Ref.
Various	April 7, 2013	Digital download	Hollywood	
United States	April 9, 2013	Mainstream radio	Hollywood	
United Kingdom	July 14, 2013	Digital download	Hollywood	

== See also ==
- List of number-one dance singles of 2013 (U.S.)
- List of Billboard Hot 100 top-ten singles in 2013
