= Kristian Aadnevik =

Norwegian fashion designer

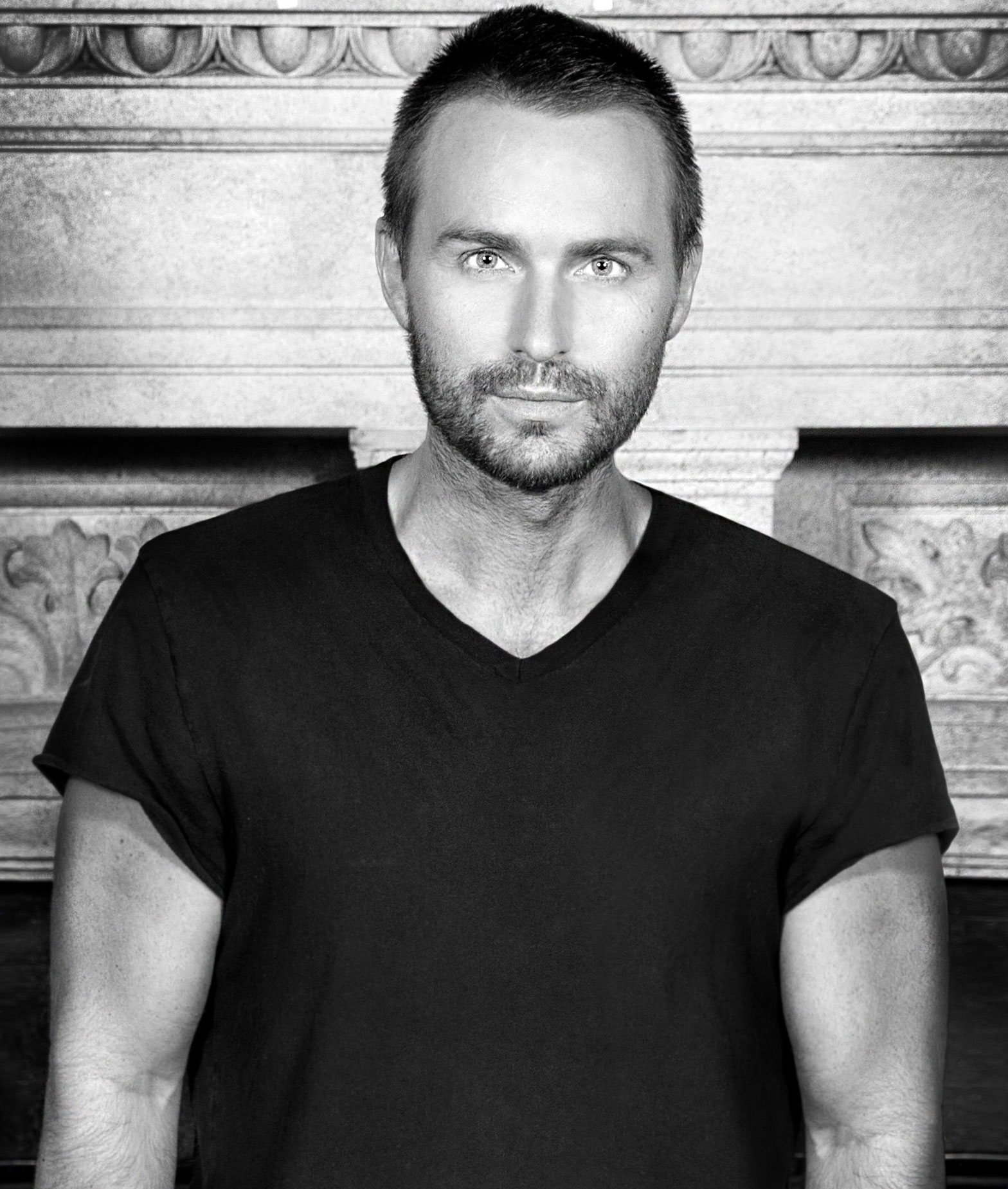
- Born: 10 January 1978 (age 47); Bergen, Norway
- Education: Royal College of Art
- Label: Aadnevik
- Spouse: Hila Aadnevik
- Awards: Bower Roebuck Tailoring Award; United Arrows Award; The Protégé Project (Donatella Versace)
- Website: kristianaadnevik.com

Kristian Aadnevik (born 10 January 1978) is a London-based Norwegian fashion designer, who graduated from Royal College of Art in 2002.

== Early life and education ==
Aadnevik was born in Bergen, Norway. After finishing his education at Bergen Yrkesskole he moved to London to pursue an MA at the Royal College of Art, where he received numerous awards. During his studies he worked as a design assistant at Alexander McQueen.

== Career ==
Aadnevik established his own label "Kristian Aadnevik" in 2004 and he presented his first collection the same year at London Fashion Week. Apart from his eponymous label he has collaborated and designed collections for several international brands including Charles Jourdan Paris for Japan, Harrods International as well as held a position as a senior designer at Roberto Cavalli.

In 2007 Aadnevik was chosen as one of five designers in "The Protégé Project", an initiative of Australian Wool Innovation, which resulted in Donatella Versace selecting him as a protégé. In line with this he showcased his F/W 2008 collection at Milan Fashion Week where his collection was met with critical acclaim and Style.com named him one of autumn 2008's most promising new talents.

Kristian retired the "Kristian Aadnevik" brand in 2013 and launched a new brand with his wife Hila called "AADNEVIK," a luxury fashion line specializing in couture and ready-to-wear garments.
