= Birthday (Selena Gomez song) =

Song by Selena Gomez

from the album Stars Dance
- Released: July 19, 2013
- Recorded: October 2012
- Studio: Conway Studios (Los Angeles, CA)
- Genre: Electropunk
- Length: 3:20
- Label: Hollywood
- Songwriters: Crista Russo; Mike Del Rio; Jacob Kasher Hindlin
- Producers: Mike Del Rio; Matt Beckley (vocal producer)

Music video
- "Birthday" on YouTube

"Birthday" is a song recorded by American singer Selena Gomez for her solo debut studio album Stars Dance (2013). It was written and produced by Mike Del Rio, with additional writing by Crista Russo and Jacob Kasher Hindlin. Matt Beckley also provided additional vocal production for the song. Musically, "Birthday" combines deep electronic dance beats and police sirens with elements of trap music. The song's instrumentation is created by blending purring, synthesized bass, snappy beats, handclaps, "oxygen-sucking" sub-bass, and trap snares with sexual moans and elements of hip hop music. Sparse drum beats and vocal chants are woven throughout the song's composition, which has been described by critics as club-ready electropunk, with trap and dubstep elements. The song was originally announced as a single, but was never officially released from the album.

Thematically, "Birthday" is a party song which discusses topics such as sex appeal, self-entitlement, and girl power, while its risqué lyrics speak of a night of hard partying. The song has received comparisons to the music of several artists, including Dev, M.I.A., and Icona Pop. Upon release, "Birthday" received favorable reviews from music critics, who praised the song's unique sound and production. Upon the release of Stars Dance, the song charted at number 12 on the US Bubbling Under Hot 100 Singles. "Birthday" has charted at number 191 on the South Korea Gaon International Chart due to high digital downloads. An accompanying music video for the song was released on July 22, 2013, to coincide with Gomez's 21st birthday, and features the artist and her friends partying and singing the song in different locations, including an underground nightclub and a dark room.

== Background and recording ==
"Birthday" was written by Crista Russo, with additional writing by Mike Del Rio and Jacob Kasher Hindlin, under his stage name "J. Kash". Production of the song was handled by Del Rio and Matt Beckley, who provided the song's vocal production. It was recorded at Conway Studios in Los Angeles, California, and was engineered by Jonathan Sher. Additional background vocals were done by Russo and Del Rio, while Serban Ghenea mixed the song at MixStar Studios in Virginia Beach, Virginia. John Hanes served as the engineer for mix, and Del Rio provided the song's programming and sequencing.

== Composition ==
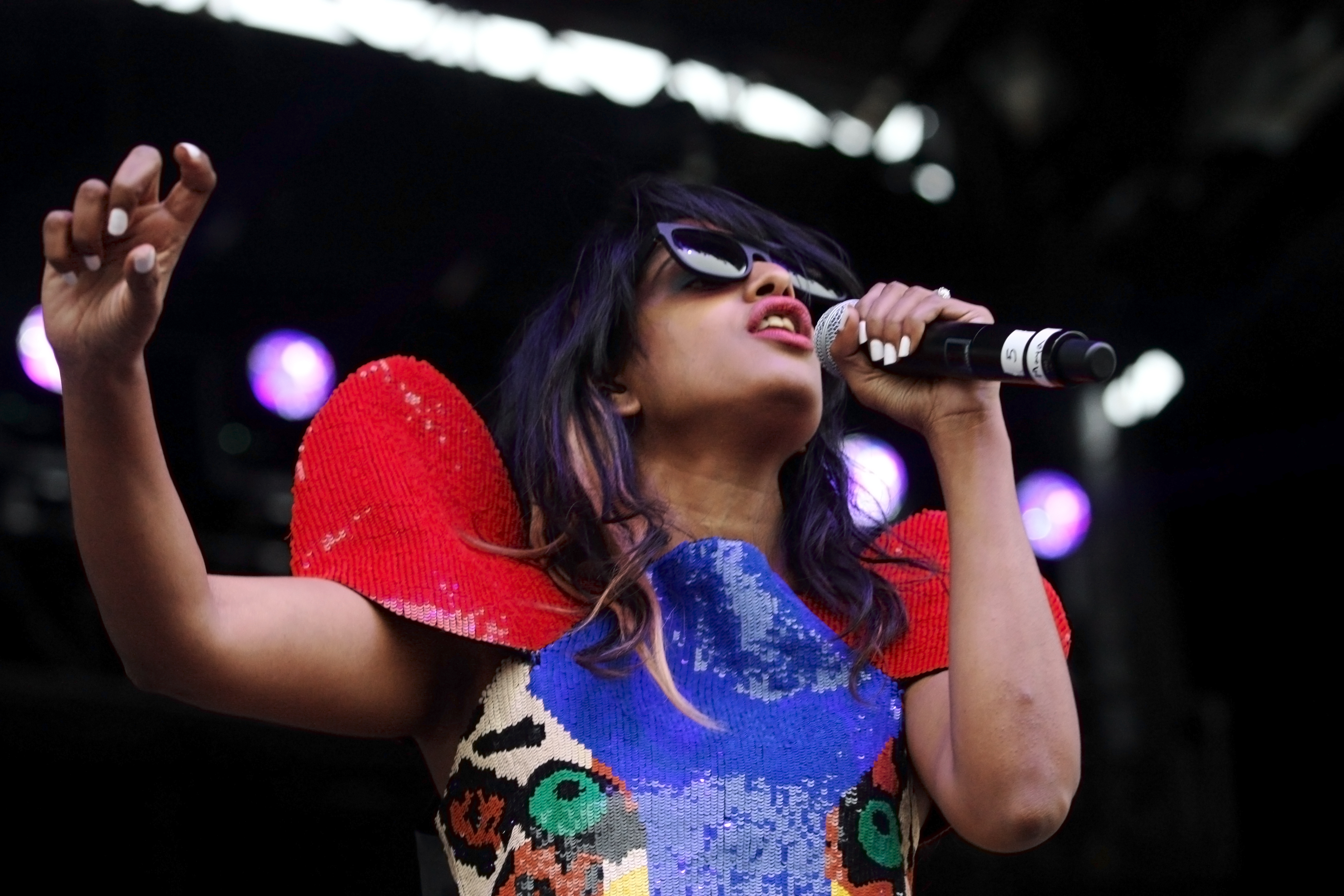
"Birthday" has drawn comparisons to the music of English recording artist M.I.A. (pictured)

"Birthday" is the three-minute and twenty-second electropunk and club-ready song, which draws influence from dubstep and trap music genres. The beat is composed of deep electronic dance beats, and is built around the sound of police sirens and sexual moans, while containing purring, synthesized bass, snappy beats, handclaps, "oxygen-sucking" sub-bass and trap snares. Sparse drum beats and vocal chants are woven throughout the song's composition, which according to Christina Drill of Popdust, is reminiscent of Gwen Stefani's debut solo album, Love. Angel. Music. Baby. (2004).

Thematically, "Birthday" has been described as a "party anthem", with the song exploring topics such as self-entitlement, partying, girl power, and sex appeal. Lyrically, the song has been described as risqué, with lyrics such as "blow your dreams, blow your dreams, blow your dreams away". According to Gomez, the song has a vibe similar to that of the Gwen Stefani song "Hollaback Girl". "Birthday" has received comparisons to several artists for its unique genre, most notably Dev, M.I.A., and Icona Pop. Julia Rubin of Headlines and Global News described the song as a "candy-coated, clap-happy club anthem with plenty of girl power and sex appeal, much like a bubblegum version of Rihanna's "Cockiness (Love It)", while Jim Farber of New York Daily News said that "Birthday" "has the bratty sense of entitlement, flagrant delivery and braying hook of Icona Pop’s smash “I Love It.”

== Critical reception ==
"Birthday" received generally favorable reviews from music critics. Natalie Palmer of Entertainment Wise said Gomez should be praised for trying something new, saying that the song "isn’t what you would expect from Selena but the genre suits her well." In a positive review, August Brown of the Los Angeles Times jokingly said the song was "almost as good as having shorts in every color." Kia Makarechi of The Huffington Post was critical of "Birthday", criticizing the song's lyrics, as well as calling the song's panting and moaning "overwrought" and "excessive". Christina Drill of Popdust gave the song a highly positive 4.5 out of 5 review, declaring it "super fun" and catchy, while later going on to say "Birthday" is "the weirdest and greatest thing Selena's ever done".

== Music video ==
On July 22, 2013, Gomez unexpectedly uploaded a music video for "Birthday" to her official YouTube channel, to coincide with her 21st birthday. Gomez left a short message, saying "I wanted to celebrate my 21st Birthday with all of you, so we made this video for us all to celebrate together. Thank You for all the love and support you have shown and continue to show me. I love you all so much!!" The video was directed by Ben Renschen and was filmed at the Roosevelt Hotel, Los Angeles on July 20, 2013, for actress Julianne Hough's birthday, two days before Gomez's actual birthday. In the video, a "smiley" Gomez is seen in a black crop top and shorts with a flannel shirt around her waist, and is shown singing the song with her friends in a dark room. The video is also interspersed with clips of a party in an underground night club, as glitter falls from the ceiling. The video ends with Gomez's friends singing "Happy Birthday" to her.

== Credits and personnel ==
Recording and management

- Recorded at Conway Studios (Los Angeles, California)
- Mixed at MixStar Studios (Virginia Beach, Virginia)
- Mastered at Sterling Sound (New York City)
- Crista Russo (BMI); Songs of Universal, Inc/Songs of KIDinaKORNER (BMI); Sony/ATV Tunes LLC/Kevinthecity Publishing/J. Kasher Music (ASCAP); Prescription Songs (ASCAP), All rights administered by Kobalt Songs Music Publishing

Personnel

- Selena Gomez – vocals
- Crista Russo – songwriting, additional vocals
- Mike Del Rio – songwriting, production, programming, additional vocals
- Jacob Kasher Hindlin – songwriting
- Matt Beckley – vocal production
- Jonathan Sher – engineering
- Serban Ghenea – mixing
- John Hanes – mix engineer
- Chris Gehringer – mastering

Credits adapted from Stars Dance liner notes.

== Awards and nominations ==
Year	Awards	Category	Work	Result
2014	Radio Disney Music Awards	Best Song To Dance To	Birthday	Won

== Chart positions ==
Chart (2013)	Peak position
South Korea (Gaon)	191
US Bubbling Under Hot 100 Singles (Billboard)	12
US Pop Digital Songs (Billboard)	29
