= 2013 MTV Movie Awards =

American awards show

- Date: Sunday, April 14, 2013
- Location: Sony Pictures Studios, Culver City, California
- Country: United States
- Hosted by: Rebel Wilson
- Website: http://www.mtv.com/ontv/movieawards/2013/

Television/radio coverage
- Network: MTV, MTV2, VH1, and Logo
- Produced by: Den of Thieves
- Directed by: Hamish Hamilton

The 2013 MTV Movie Awards were held on April 14, 2013, at Sony Pictures Studios in Culver City, California. The show was hosted by Rebel Wilson. The nominees were announced on March 5.

== Performers ==
- Rebel Wilson, Skylar Astin, Anna Camp, Ester Dean, Adam DeVine, Alexis Knapp, Hana Mae Lee, Ben Platt, Utkarsh Ambudkar, and Brittany Snow – "The Climb / Lose Yourself / Thrift Shop / Girl on Fire"
- Macklemore and Ryan Lewis featuring Ray Dalton – "Can't Hold Us"
- Selena Gomez – "Come & Get It"

== Presenters ==
- Melissa McCarthy – presented Best Male Performance
- Adam Sandler and Chris Rock – presented Best WTF Moment
- Chris Pine, Zachary Quinto, and Zoe Saldaña – presented Best Fight
- Eddie Redmayne, Logan Lerman, and Jonah Hill – presented Trailblazer Award
- Steve Carell and Amanda Seyfried – presented Best Kiss
- Snoop Dogg and Kesha – introduced Macklemore and Ryan Lewis
- Peter Dinklage – presented Comedic Genius Award
- Paul Walker, Vin Diesel, Jordana Brewster, and Michelle Rodriguez – presented Best Breakthrough Performance
- Zac Efron, Danny McBride, and Seth Rogen – presented Best Shirtless Performance
- Quvenzhané Wallis and Chloë Grace Moretz – presented Best Villain
- Kim Kardashian – introduced Selena Gomez
- Kerry Washington – presented MTV Generation Award
- Liam Hemsworth – presented the teaser for The Hunger Games: Catching Fire
- Ashley Rickards and Tyler Posey – presented Best Musical Moment
- Brad Pitt – presented Movie of the Year

== Films with multiple nominations ==
- Seven - The Dark Knight Rises, Silver Linings Playbook, Ted, and Django Unchained
- Six - The Avengers
- Five - Skyfall
- Four - Pitch Perfect and The Perks of Being a Wallflower
- Three - Les Misérables and Magic Mike
- Two - The Hobbit: An Unexpected Journey, Life of Pi, and Savages

== Films with multiple awards ==
- Three - The Avengers and Silver Linings Playbook
- Two - Pitch Perfect

== Awards ==
Movie of the Year
The Avengers; The Dark Knight Rises; Django Unchained; Silver Linings Playbook; Ted
| Best Male Performance | Best Female Performance |
| Bradley Cooper – Silver Linings Playbook; Ben Affleck – Argo; Channing Tatum – Magic Mike; Daniel Day-Lewis – Lincoln; Jamie Foxx – Django Unchained | Jennifer Lawrence – Silver Linings Playbook; Anne Hathaway – Les Misérables; Emma Watson – The Perks of Being a Wallflower; Mila Kunis – Ted; Rebel Wilson – Pitch Perfect |
| Breakthrough Performance | Best Villain |
| Rebel Wilson – Pitch Perfect; Eddie Redmayne – Les Misérables; Ezra Miller – The Perks of Being a Wallflower; Quvenzhané Wallis – Beasts of the Southern Wild; Suraj Sharma – Life of Pi | Tom Hiddleston – The Avengers; Javier Bardem – Skyfall; Leonardo DiCaprio – Django Unchained; Marion Cotillard – The Dark Knight Rises; Tom Hardy – The Dark Knight Rises |
| Best Hero | Best Scared-as-S**t Performance |
| Martin Freeman – The Hobbit: An Unexpected Journey; Christian Bale – The Dark Knight Rises; Robert Downey Jr. – The Avengers; Mark Ruffalo – The Avengers; Kristen Stewart – Snow White and the Huntsman | Suraj Sharma – Life of Pi; Alexandra Daddario – Texas Chainsaw 3D; Jennifer Lawrence – House at the End of the Street; Jessica Chastain – Zero Dark Thirty; Martin Freeman – The Hobbit: An Unexpected Journey |
| Best Shirtless Performance | Summer's Biggest Teen Bad A** |
| Taylor Lautner – The Twilight Saga: Breaking Dawn – Part 2; Channing Tatum – Magic Mike; Christian Bale – The Dark Knight Rises; Daniel Craig – Skyfall; Seth MacFarlane – Ted | Chloë Grace Moretz – Kick-Ass 2; Logan Lerman – Percy Jackson: Sea of Monsters; Lily Collins – The Mortal Instruments: City of Bones; Jaden Smith – After Earth |
| Best Kiss | Best Fight |
| Jennifer Lawrence and Bradley Cooper – Silver Linings Playbook; Emma Watson and Logan Lerman – The Perks of Being a Wallflower; Kara Hayward and Jared Gilman – Moonrise Kingdom; Kerry Washington and Jamie Foxx – Django Unchained; Mila Kunis and Mark Wahlberg – Ted | Robert Downey Jr., Chris Evans, Mark Ruffalo, Chris Hemsworth, Scarlett Johansson, and Jeremy Renner vs. Tom Hiddleston – The Avengers; Christian Bale vs. Tom Hardy – The Dark Knight Rises; Jamie Foxx vs. Candieland Henchmen – Django Unchained; Daniel Craig vs. Ola Rapace – Skyfall; Mark Wahlberg vs. Seth MacFarlane – Ted |
| Best On-Screen Duo | Best Musical Moment |
| Mark Wahlberg and Seth MacFarlane – Ted; Robert Downey Jr. and Mark Ruffalo – The Avengers; Leonardo DiCaprio and Samuel L. Jackson – Django Unchained; Jennifer Lawrence and Bradley Cooper – Silver Linings Playbook; Will Ferrell and Zach Galifianakis – The Campaign | Anna Kendrick, Rebel Wilson, Anna Camp, Brittany Snow, Alexis Knapp, Ester Dean, and Hana Mae Lee – "No Diggity" (from Pitch Perfect); Anne Hathaway – "I Dreamed a Dream" (from Les Misérables); Channing Tatum, Matt Bomer, Joe Manganiello, Kevin Nash, and Adam Rodríguez – "It's Raining Men" (from Magic Mike); Emma Watson, Logan Lerman, and Ezra Miller – "Come On Eileen" (from The Perks of Being a Wallflower); Jennifer Lawrence and Bradley Cooper – "Don't You Worry 'bout a Thing / Fell in Love with a Girl" (from Silver Linings Playbook) |
| #WTF Moment | Best Latino Actor |
| Candieland Gets Smoked – Jamie Foxx and Samuel L. Jackson (from Django Unchained); Hack-Appella – Anna Camp (from Pitch Perfect); Final Descent – Denzel Washington (from Flight); Oops ... There Goes His Face – Javier Bardem (from Skyfall); Ted Gets Saucy – Seth MacFarlane (from Ted) | Javier Bardem – Skyfall; Benicio del Toro – Savages; John Ortiz – Silver Linings Playbook; Michael Peña – End of Watch; Salma Hayek – Savages |

=== Comedic Genius Award ===
- Will Ferrell

=== MTV Trailblazer Award ===
- Emma Watson

=== MTV Generation Award ===
- Jamie Foxx

== Sneak peeks ==
- Liam Hemsworth presented a teaser trailer for The Hunger Games: Catching Fire.
- Sneak peeks for Star Trek Into Darkness, Fast & Furious 6, and World War Z were shown.
- An Iron Man 3 extended clip was shown during commercial.
