= Slow Down (Selena Gomez song) =

2013 single by Selena Gomez

Single by Selena Gomez

from the album Stars Dance
- B-side: "Lover in Me"; "I Like It That Way"
- Released: August 13, 2013
- Genre: Dance-pop; EDM
- Length: 3:30
- Label: Hollywood
- Songwriters: Lindy Robbins; Julia Michaels; Niles Hollowell-Dhar; David Kuncio; Freddy Wexler
- Producers: The Cataracs, David Kuncio

Selena Gomez singles chronology
"Come & Get It" (2013)	"Slow Down" (2013)	"The Heart Wants What It Wants" (2014)

Music video
- "Slow Down" on YouTube

"Slow Down" is a song recorded by American singer Selena Gomez from her debut solo studio album, Stars Dance (2013). It was made available for instant digital download along with the pre-order of the album on June 3, 2013. Hollywood Records later sent the song to mainstream radio as the second and final single from the album on August 13, 2013. The song was produced by The Cataracs and David Kuncio, and infuses EDM elements in its instrumentation. Gomez has been quoted by saying the song speaks of slowing down time by stopping the sun's orbit around Earth and living in one magical moment on the dance floor.

Music critics gave a favorable reception to the song, with some praising its catchiness and fun production. Slow Down has achieved moderate success, peaking inside the top 20 in The Czech Republic, Russia, and South Korea. In the United States, the song peaked at number 27 on the Billboard Hot 100, reached number-one on Billboard's Hot Dance Club Songs chart, and it has been certified Platinum by the Recording Industry Association of America (RIAA) for selling over 1,000,000 units of the single in the country. On the Mainstream Top 40 airplay chart, it reached the position of number 7.

The accompanying music video for "Slow Down" was directed by Philip Andelman and filmed in Paris, France. It features Gomez singing along to the track inside of a car, partying in a nightclub, and strutting down the streets of the city. Gomez has performed "Slow Down" in a number of live appearances, including on Good Morning America, The Tonight Show with Jay Leno, Late Show with David Letterman, and UK TV show Surprise, Surprise. It was also performed as the encore of her Stars Dance Tour.

== Background and composition ==
"Slow Down"
An 18-second sample of the song's pre-chorus features Gomez singing over a "pseudo-dubstep" instrumentation with influences of EDM. Lyrically, the song speaks of taking a relationship slowly rather than rushing into things.

On June 3, 2013, during a live chat on her YouTube channel, Gomez revealed that her debut solo studio album would be titled Stars Dance, and also revealed the album's track listing and cover art. During the same chat, the singer announced she would release "Slow Down" as the second single from the album, after "Come & Get It", and that fans would be able to download the song right after pre-ordering the album on iTunes. On August 13, the song was sent to mainstream radio in the United States, while a digital remixes EP was released the following week on Amazon.com. On September 6, a digital EP with "Lover in Me", "I Like It That Way" and the Cosmic Dawn remix of "Come & Get It" as b-sides, was released through iTunes in some countries including Brazil, Norway, and Vietnam. The EP was released in the United Kingdom on December 8.

The song was written by Lindy Robbins, Julia Michaels, Niles Hollowell-Dhar, David Kuncio and Freddy Wexler and was produced by both Hollowell-Dhar, under the production team pseudonym The Cataracs, and Dave Kuncio. "Slow Down" is a high-octane, uptempo dance-pop and EDM song, that has been described as "wobbly club thumper" by Robert Copsey of Digital Spy. It features a dubstep pre-chorus, funk guitars, a four on the floor beat, and a spoken word outro. Lyrically, the song speaks of not wanting a night to end, with Gomez singing, "Can we take it nice and slow, slow / Break it down and drop it low, low / Cause I just wanna party all night in the neon lights 'til you can't let me go." It is written in the key of C♯ minor. Gomez's vocals span from the low note of B_{3} to the high note of C♯_{5}.

== Critical reception ==
Andrew Hampp of Billboard called the song "harmless, frothy fun", while complimenting its "pseudo-dubstep pre-chorus breakdown, stretched-out staccato vocal loops and not-too-naughty-for Disney lyrics ("You know I'm good with mouth-to-mouth resuscitation")". Caryn Ganz of Rolling Stone noted that Gomez's producers "finally [gave] her tighter tunes" like "Slow Down", adding that it is "ripe for remixing." Writing for the Los Angeles Times, August Brown thought the production "Slow Down" is "rooted in today's pop-EDM default mode, but as that stuff goes, [the song] is pretty capable." PopDust contributor Christina Drill was critical towards the song, considering it "adequate-but-forgettable", and further stating: "the only thing that separates it from the faceless EDM masses? Selena cooing, 'You know I'm good with mouth to mouth resuscitation' in a way that's almost believable. A total whatever." Matthew Horton of Virgin Media deemed it "charmless". Joseph Atilano of the Philippine Daily Inquirer stated that "some of the lyrics are a bit suggestive but there is nothing in them that would turn off any of her loyal fans."

== Chart performance ==
After being released for instant digital download with the pre-order of Stars Dance, "Slow Down" charted in several countries, including Australia, where it peaked at number 91, and in Austria, staying on the country's chart for two weeks before peaking at number 71. The song has charted for 32 weeks in France, and has so far peaked at number 31, making the song the third entry for Gomez there, after "Love You Like A Love Song" and "Come & Get It". In the Ultratip charts from Belgium, it peaked at number 2 in Flanders and number 13 in Wallonia. On the Billboard Hot 100 in the United States, "Slow Down" peaked at number 27, and has been certified Platinum by the Recording Industry Association of America (RIAA). On the Pop Songs component chart, the song entered the top 10 and reached the position of number 7. As of July 2015, "Slow Down" has sold 1 million copies in the United States.

== Music video ==
The accompanying music video for "Slow Down" was directed by Philip Andelman and filmed in Paris, France in May 2013. It leaked online on July 19, and was later uploaded to her official Vevo account. The video features Gomez sitting in the back seat of a Mercedes-Benz 600 (W100) short-wheelbase. The car scenes are combined with her walking the streets of Paris dancing in a club dressed in a two-piece outfit with backup dancers in front of pulsating neon lights. Sam Lansky of Idolator commented that the video has "no narrative, but it's Selena being grown-and-sexy, which is more than adequate narrative for me. It's a cherry on top of how fine the Stars Dance era has already been, and it augurs well for what's to come." A blogger for MuchMusic noted similarities on "Slow Down" to early music videos by recording artists Britney Spears, Janet Jackson and Jennifer Lopez.

When the music video for the song was leaked online, Keith Girard of celebrity gossip site The Improper wrote that the music video for "Slow Down" had elements of the death of Diana, Princess of Wales. Keith says that "Selena Gomez's new video for song 'Slow Down' contains some eerie parallels to the death of Princess Diana. Selena races through the Paris streets in a vintage Mercedes similar to Diana's on the night she was killed in a car crash." Caroline Bologna of Hollywood.com picked up on the matter on the same day and mentioned how the footage of the vintage car speeding through tunnels is similar to the princess' death.

== Live performances ==
Gomez performed "Slow Down" on The Tonight Show with Jay Leno on July 24, 2013, and on Good Morning America and Live with Kelly and Michael on July 26. On October 17, she performed the song on The View and Late Show with David Letterman. Gomez then travelled to the United Kingdom and performed the song on Surprise, Surprise on September 20. Gomez also taped a performance on The X Factor USA to be aired originally on November 7; however, due to voting glitches for the day's episode, it aired the following week, on November 14. On November 28, the singer performed "Slow Down" in a medley with "Like a Champion" and "Come & Get It" during Dallas Cowboys Thanksgiving Halftime Show. After the performance was announced, Gomez stated, "I'm from Texas, so I'm a little nervous, I'm not going to lie. But I'm very honored and I hope that we come—me, my dancers and my band—and we give Texas a really good show and I make them proud." "Slow Down" was also performed as the encore of her Stars Dance Tour with the music video playing in the background on the screen. The song was also part of the setlist on Gomez's Revival Tour in 2016.

== Awards and nominations ==
Year	Awards	Category	Result
2013	World Music Awards	Best Song	Nominated
2013	World Music Awards	Best Video	Nominated

== Formats and track listings ==
- Digital EP
1. "Slow Down" – 3:30
2. "Lover In Me" – 3:28
3. "I Like It That Way" – 4:11
4. "Come & Get It" (Cosmic Dawn Club Remix) – 6:29
- Digital remixes – EP
1. "Slow Down" (Chew Fu Refix) – 5:48
2. "Slow Down" (Danny Verde Remix) – 6:49
3. "Slow Down" (DJLW Remix) – 6:56
4. "Slow Down" (Jason Nevins Remix) – 5:54
5. "Slow Down" (Smash Mode Remix) – 5:21
- Reggae remixes
1. "Slow Down" (Sure Shot Rockers Reggae Remix) – 7:15
2. "Slow Down" (Sure Shot Rockers Reggae Radio Edit) – 3:38
3. "Slow Down" (Sure Shot Rockers Reggae Dub Remix) – 3:16
- Remixes CD
1. "Slow Down" (Chew Fu ReFix) – 5:47
2. "Slow Down" (Danny Verde Remix) – 6:48
3. "Slow Down" (DJLW Remix) – 7:10
4. "Slow Down" (Jason Nevins Remix) – 6:00
5. "Slow Down" (Smash Mode Remix) – 5:22
6. "Slow Down" (Paolo Ortelli & Luke Degree Remix) – 6:11
7. "Slow Down" (Enrry Senna Remix) – 6:37
8. "Slow Down" (Razor 'N' Guido Remix) – 7:20
9. "Slow Down" (Mike Cruz Remix) – 6:30
10. "Slow Down" (Silver A.'s Remix) – 4:35
11. "Slow Down" (Ryan Kenney Remix) – 6:04
12. "Slow Down" (Sure Shot Rockers Reggae Remix) – 7:16

== Credits and personnel ==
Recording and management

- Mixed at MixStar Studios (Virginia Beach, Virginia)
- Mastered at Sterling Sound (New York City)
- Hey Kiddo Music (ASCAP), All Rights administered by Kobalt Songs Music Publishing (ASCAP); Bok Music/Screaming Beauty Music (BMI); Sony/ATV Tunes LLC/Indie Pop Music (ASCAP); David Kuncio (ASCAP)/The Real Brain Publishing (BMI); Electric Fuzz Publishing (BMI)

Personnel

- Selena Gomez – vocals
- Lindy Robbins – songwriting
- Julia Michaels – songwriting
- Niles Hollowell-Dhar – songwriting, production (in name of The Cataracs), vocal production
- David Kuncio – songwriting, co-production
- Freddy Wexler – songwriting
- Serban Ghenea – mixing
- John Hanes – mixing engineer
- Chris Gehringer – mastering

Credits adapted from Stars Dance liner notes.

== Charts ==
=== Weekly charts ===
Chart (2013)	Peak position
Australia (ARIA)	93
Austria (Ö3 Austria Top 40)	71
Belgium (Ultratip Bubbling Under Flanders)	2
Belgium (Ultratop 50 Wallonia)	40
Canada (Canadian Hot 100)	29
CIS Airplay (TopHit)	17
Czech Republic (Rádio – Top 100)	12
France (SNEP)	31
Greece Digital Songs (Billboard)	8
Ireland (IRMA)	98
Mexico Anglo (Monitor Latino)	15
Mexico Ingles Airplay (Billboard)	8
Russia Airplay (TopHit)	11
South Korea (GIC)	15
UK Singles (OCC)	106
Ukraine Airplay (TopHit)	31
US Billboard Hot 100	27
US Adult Pop Airplay (Billboard)	26
US Dance Club Songs (Billboard)	1
US Latin Pop Airplay (Billboard)	39
US Pop Airplay (Billboard)	7
US Rhythmic Airplay (Billboard)	33
Venezuela Pop Rock General (Record Report)	1

=== Year-end charts ===
Chart (2013)	Position
France (SNEP)	148
Russia Airplay (TopHit)	118
Ukraine Airplay (TopHit)	185
US Dance Club Songs (Billboard)	48

== Certifications ==
Region	Certification	Certified units/sales
Australia (ARIA)	Gold	35,000^{‡}
Brazil (Pro-Música Brasil)	Gold	30,000^{‡}
Mexico (AMPROFON)	Gold	30,000^{*}
United States (RIAA)	2× Platinum	2,000,000^{‡}
^{*} Sales figures based on certification alone.^{‡} Sales+streaming figures based on certification alone.

== Release history ==
=== Promotional release ===
Date	Format
June 3, 2013	Digital download

=== Single release ===
Country	Date	Format	Label
United States	August 13, 2013	Mainstream radio	Hollywood
United States	August 20, 2013	Digital remixes – EP	Hollywood
Brazil	September 6, 2013	Digital EP	Hollywood
Norway	September 6, 2013	Digital EP	Hollywood
Vietnam	September 6, 2013	Digital EP	Hollywood
Italy	September 13, 2013	Mainstream radio	Universal
United Kingdom	February 9, 2014	Digital EP	Hollywood

== See also ==
- List of number-one dance singles of 2013 (U.S.)
