= We Own the Night Tour =

2011–12 concert tour by Selena Gomez & the Scene

- Continental tour by Selena Gomez & the Scene
- Promotional poster for the tour
- Location: North America • South America
- Associated album: When the Sun Goes Down
- Start date: July 24, 2011
- End date: February 11, 2012
- Legs: 2
- No. of shows: 59
- Attendance: 391,551 (45 shows)
- Box office: $15.4 million (45 shows) ($22.04 million in 2025 dollars)
Selena Gomez & the Scene tour chronology
A Year Without Rain Tour (2010–2011)	We Own the Night Tour (2011–2012)

The We Own the Night Tour was the third and final concert tour by American band Selena Gomez & the Scene, in support of their third and final studio album, When the Sun Goes Down.

== Background ==
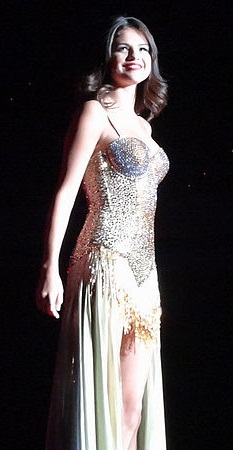
Gomez in 2011.

On March 23, 2011, Hollywood Records announced through a press release that Selena Gomez & The Scene would be touring in the United States and Canada during the second half of 2011. The first show confirmed was at the Orange County Fair in Costa Mesa, Calif, while sales started on April 2, 2011. "I am so excited to see my incredible fans on tour", Gomez said in a statement, that confirmed the tour name as We Own the Night Tour. "We're working on a great production and set lists including some surprise covers. I want to make sure everyone has a fun time."

The surprise cover was later revealed to be a tribute to American recording artist Britney Spears. Gomez further stated that Spears' Dream Within a Dream Tour was the first concert she attended. Nearly 30 tour dates were confirmed a few days later. When asked about the tour, Gomez stated.

"I am very excited to be on my first headlining tour. I'm nervous more than anything because I feel like there's going to be a bit of expectation [...] I am so excited to see my incredible fans on tour. We're working a great production and set lists, including some surprise covers. I want to make sure everyone has a fun time. [...] I think with this whole tour, I'm trying my best to be as creative as possible", she explains. "So, there's going to be a production, there's going to be videos, effects, dancers, a lot of glitter ... I just wanted to make it feel like a rave."

== Set list ==
1. "A Year Without Rain"
2. "Hit the Lights"
3. "Summer's Not Hot"
4. "Round & Round"
5. "The Way I Loved You"
6. "We Own the Night"
7. "Love You Like a Love Song"
8. "Spotlight"
9. "Bang Bang Bang"
10. "When the Sun Goes Down"
11. "Intuition"
12. "Falling Down"
13. "Super Bass"
14. "Rock God"
15. "Middle of Nowhere"
16. "My Dilemma"
17. "Off the Chain"
18. "...Baby One More Time" / "(You Drive Me) Crazy" / "I'm a Slave 4 U" / "Oops!... I Did It Again" / "Toxic" / "Hold It Against Me"
19. "Whiplash"
20. "Tell Me Something I Don't Know"
21. "Naturally"

Encore

22. "Who Says"
23. "Magic"

== Tour dates ==
List of 2011 concerts
Date (2011)	City	Country	Venue	Opening acts	Attendance	Revenue
July 24^{[A]}	Costa Mesa	United States	Pacific Amphitheatre	—N/a	—N/a	—N/a
July 25^{[B]}	Paso Robles	United States	Main Grandstand Arena	Big Time Rush	—N/a	—N/a
July 28	Boca Raton	United States	Mizner Park Amphitheater	Christina Grimmie Allstar Weekend	—N/a	—N/a
July 30	Clearwater	United States	Ruth Eckerd Hall	Christina Grimmie Allstar Weekend	2,075 / 2,075	$112,191
July 31	St. Augustine	United States	St. Augustine Amphitheatre	Christina Grimmie Allstar Weekend	—N/a	—N/a
August 2	Atlanta	United States	Chastain Park Amphitheater	Christina Grimmie Allstar Weekend	—N/a	—N/a
August 3	Charlotte	United States	Charlotte Metro Credit Union Amphitheatre	Christina Grimmie Allstar Weekend	—N/a	—N/a
August 5	Bethel	United States	Bethel Woods Center for the Arts	Christina Grimmie Allstar Weekend	—N/a	—N/a
August 9	Darien	United States	Darien Lake Performing Arts Center	Christina Grimmie Allstar Weekend	—N/a	—N/a
August 10	Clarkston (Note: Labelled as Detroit in promotional material)	United States	DTE Energy Music Theatre	Christina Grimmie Allstar Weekend	15,005 / 15,005	$338,220
August 12	Papillion (Note: Labelled as Omaha in promotional material)	United States	Werner Park	Christina Grimmie Allstar Weekend	—N/a	—N/a
August 13	Rosemont (Note: Labelled as Chicago in promotional material)	United States	Rosemont Theatre	Christina Grimmie Allstar Weekend	—N/a	—N/a
August 14	Cleveland	United States	Jacobs Pavilion at Nautica	Christina Grimmie Allstar Weekend	—N/a	—N/a
August 16	Gilford	United States	Meadowbrook U.S. Cellular Pavilion	Christina Grimmie Allstar Weekend	5,931 / 5,933	$217,771
August 17	Uncasville	United States	Mohegan Sun Arena	Christina Grimmie Allstar Weekend	—N/a	—N/a
August 19	Philadelphia	United States	Mann Center for the Performing Arts	Christina Grimmie Allstar Weekend	10,349 / 10,921	$360,386
August 20	Holmdel	United States	PNC Bank Arts Center	Christina Grimmie Allstar Weekend	—N/a	—N/a
August 21	Hershey	United States	Star Pavilion	Christina Grimmie Allstar Weekend	—N/a	—N/a
August 23	Toronto	Canada	Molson Canadian Amphitheatre	Shawn Desman	—N/a	—N/a
August 25	Boston	United States	Bank of America Pavilion	Christina Grimmie; Allstar Weekend	—N/a	—N/a
August 26^{[C]}	Timonium (Note: Labelled as Baltimore in promotional material)	United States	Timonium Racetrack	Christina Grimmie; Allstar Weekend	—N/a	—N/a
August 27^{[D]}	Syracuse	United States	Mohegan Sun Grandstand	Christina Grimmie; Allstar Weekend	—N/a	—N/a
August 29	St. Louis	United States	Fabulous Fox Theatre	Christina Grimmie; Allstar Weekend	—N/a	—N/a
August 31	Dallas	United States	Gexa Energy Pavilion	Christina Grimmie; Allstar Weekend	—N/a	—N/a
September 1	Kansas City	United States	Starlight Theatre	Christina Grimmie; Allstar Weekend	—N/a	—N/a
September 3^{[E]}	Pueblo	United States	Colorado State Fair Events Center	Christina Grimmie; Allstar Weekend	—N/a	—N/a
September 4	Broomfield (Note: Labelled as Denver in promotional material)	United States	1stBank Center	Christina Grimmie; Allstar Weekend	—N/a	—N/a
September 5^{[F]}	Salem	United States	L.B. Day Comcast Amphitheatre	Christina Grimmie; Allstar Weekend	—N/a	—N/a
September 7	West Valley City (Note: Labelled as Salt Lake City in promotional material)	United States	Maverik Center	Christina Grimmie; Allstar Weekend	6,426 / 6,426	$237,555
September 9	San Diego	United States	Valley View Casino Center	Christina Grimmie; Allstar Weekend	—N/a	—N/a
September 10	Las Vegas	United States	Mandalay Bay Events Center	Christina Grimmie; Allstar Weekend	—N/a	—N/a
September 12^{[G]}	Puyallup	United States	Northwest Concert Theater	Christina Grimmie; Allstar Weekend	—N/a	—N/a
October 13	Victoria	Canada	Save-On-Foods Memorial Centre	Shawn Desman	—N/a	—N/a
October 14	Vancouver	Canada	Rogers Arena	Shawn Desman	—N/a	—N/a
October 16	Edmonton	Canada	Rexall Place	Shawn Desman	13,027 / 13,093	$576,342
October 17	Calgary	Canada	Scotiabank Saddledome	Shawn Desman	—N/a	—N/a
October 19	Saskatoon	Canada	Credit Union Centre	Shawn Desman	—N/a	—N/a
October 21	Winnipeg	Canada	MTS Centre	Shawn Desman	—N/a	—N/a
October 23	Cleveland	United States	Wolstein Center	Christina Grimmie; Allstar Weekend	—N/a	—N/a
October 24	London	Canada	John Labatt Centre	Shawn Desman; Christina Grimmie	8,389 / 8,465	$393,878
October 25	Oshawa	Canada	General Motors Centre	Shawn Desman; Christina Grimmie	5,289 / 5,289	$277,075
October 28	Ottawa	Canada	Scotiabank Place	Shawn Desman; Christina Grimmie	—N/a	—N/a
October 29	Hamilton	Canada	Copps Coliseum	Shawn Desman; Christina Grimmie	—N/a	—N/a
October 30	Montreal	Canada	Bell Centre	Shawn Desman; Christina Grimmie	12,654 / 12, 654	$584,809
December 1^{[H]}	Sacramento	United States	Power Balance Pavilion	Christina Grimmie; Allstar Weekend	—N/a	—N/a
December 2^{[I]}	Phoenix	United States	U.S. Airways Center	Christina Grimmie; Allstar Weekend	—N/a	—N/a
December 13^{[J]}	San Jose (Note: Labelled as San Francisco in promotional material)	United States	HP Pavilion at San Jose	Christina Grimmie; Allstar Weekend	—N/a	—N/a
December 17^{[K]}	Rosemont	United States	Allstate Arena	Christina Grimmie; Allstar Weekend	—N/a	—N/a
December 18^{[L]}	Seattle	United States	WaMu Theater	Christina Grimmie; Allstar Weekend	—N/a	—N/a

List of 2012 concerts
Date (2012)	City	Country	Venue	Opening acts	Attendance	Revenue
January 22	San Juan	Puerto Rico	Coliseo de Puerto Rico	JC Rosary	3,999 / 4,141	$356,096
January 24	Panama City	Panama	Plaza Figali	—N/a	—N/a	—N/a
January 26	Mexico City	Mexico	Palacio de los Deportes	DJ Raul Rodriguez	15,961 / 16,666	$748,995
January 27	Guadalajara	Mexico	Arena VFG	DJ Raul Rodriguez	10,122 / 11,090	$433,434
January 30	Santiago	Chile	Movistar Arena	Rock Bones	—N/a	—N/a
February 2	Lima	Peru	Jockey Club Parcela H	Mia Mont	16,345 / 16,345	$792,834
February 4	Rio de Janeiro	Brazil	HSBC Arena	College 11	6,330 / 6,330	$658,283
February 5	São Paulo	Brazil	Via Funchal	College 11	5,470 / 5,470	$459,279
February 7	Córdoba	Argentina	Orfeo Superdomo	—N/a	—N/a	—N/a
February 9	Buenos Aires	Argentina	Estadio G.E.B.A.	College 11	—N/a	—N/a
February 11	Montevideo	Uruguay	Estadio Charrúa	—N/a	—N/a	—N/a
TOTAL					121,027 / 123,558 (98%)	$5,754,314

Festivals and other miscellaneous performances

^{A} This concert was a part of the Orange County Fair
^{B} This concert was a part of the California Mid-State Fair
^{C} This concert was a part of the Maryland State Fair
^{D} This concert was a part of the Grandstand Concert Series
^{E} This concert was a part of the Colorado State Fair
^{F} This concert was a part of the "Oregon State Fair"

^{G} This concert was a part of the "Puyallup Fair Concert Series"
^{H} This concert is a part of the "KDND's Jingle Ball"
^{I} This concert is a part of "Phooson"
^{J} This concert is a part of "99.7's Triple Ho Show"
^{K} This concert is a part of "B96's SoBe Lifewater Jingle Bash"
^{L} This concert is a part of "106.1 KISS FM's Jingle Bell Bash"
