= III (Foster the People EP) =

EP by Foster the People
- Released: April 27, 2017
- Recorded: 2016–2017
- Genre: Indie pop; indietronica; synth-pop
- Length: 11:54
- Label: Columbia
- Producer: Mark Foster; Josh Abraham; Oligee; Lars Stalfors; Isom Innis

Foster the People chronology
Supermodel (2014)	III (2017)	Sacred Hearts Club (2017)

Singles from III
- 1. "Doing It for the Money" Released: April 27, 2017

III is the third extended play (EP) by American indie pop band Foster the People, released on April 27, 2017, through Columbia Records. It is composed of three songs that precede the band's third full-length studio album, Sacred Hearts Club. The release’s artwork was heavily criticized online for bearing a striking resemblance to New York metalcore band Every Time I Die’s 2016 album Low Teens, which was released the previous autumn.

== Background ==
In 2016, Foster the People performed three brand new songs at the Rocking the Daisies Music Festival, "Pay the Man", "Lotus Eater", and "Doing It for the Money", and announced that they would be on their upcoming third studio album. On April 5, 2017, the band announced a headlining summer tour in support of the album.

The band released three brand new songs, "Pay the Man", "Doing It for the Money", and "SHC", in the form of the III EP on April 27, 2017. The tracks are also featured on the band's third studio album, Sacred Hearts Club, released on July 21, 2017. The album was the first studio album to feature longtime touring musicians Sean Cimino and Isom Innis as official members.

The band collaborated with OneRepublic frontman Ryan Tedder, who served as co-writer on the song "Doing It for the Money".

The band came under fire by the hardcore punk and metalcore communities after being accused of "ripping off" the cover art from Every Time I Die's acclaimed 2016 release, Low Teens with both covers utilizing a near identical format. The band has never responded or acknowledged the similarities.

== Track listing ==
No.	Title	Length
1.	"Pay the Man"	3:54
2.	"Doing It for the Money"	3:46
3.	"SHC"	4:14

SHC's length was cut by six seconds on the full album, resulting in a time of 4:08.

== Personnel ==
Foster the People

- Mark Foster – lead vocals, guitar, drums, percussion, piano, programming, synthesizer, vibraphone, songwriting, production
- Mark Pontius – drums, percussion, songwriting
- Sean Cimino – guitar, piano, keyboards, backing vocals
- Isom Innis – piano, keyboards, drums, percussion, backing vocals, songwriting, production

Additional personnel

- Ryan Tedder – songwriter
- Adam Schmalholz – songwriter
- Keinan Abdi Warsame – songwriter
- Justin Mohrle – songwriter
- Derek "MixedByAli" Ali – mixing engineer
- Manny Marroquin – mixing engineer
- Chris Galland – mixing engineer
- Rich Costey – mixing engineer
- Martin Cooke – mixing engineer
- Nicolas Fournier – mixing engineer
- Jeff Jackson – assistant engineer
- Robin Florent – assistant engineer
- Cyrus Taghipour – assistant engineer
- Tyler Page – assistant engineer
- Greg Calbi – mastering engineer
- Josh Abraham – producer, songwriter
- Oliver "Oligee" Goldstein – producer, songwriter
- Lars Stalfors – producer, songwriter
