= IN-Q =

- Born: Adam Schmalholz
- Occupations: Songwriter, writer, poet
- Musical career
- Genres: Spoken word, pop, hip hop
- Years active: 1998–present
- Website: www.in-q.com

IN-Q or IN-Query, is the stage name of Adam Schmalholz, an American songwriter and National Poetry Slam champion from Los Angeles, California. Schmalholz describes his poetry as a reflection of his own experiences and life lessons. Recognized for his ability to bring poetry to pop culture, IN-Q helped establish one of the largest open mic poetry venues in the United States called "Da Poetry Lounge," held at the Greenway Court Theatre in Los Angeles.

In 2017, he was named one of the top creatives on Oprah's SuperSoul 100 list. He is the first poet to perform at a Cirque Du Soleil production and as a songwriter, IN-Q has worked with artists like Miley Cyrus, Aloe Blacc, Mike Posner, Selena Gomez and co-wrote the official World Cup anthem in 2014.

== History ==
Raised by a single mother in Santa Monica, IN-Q admits his introduction to what is now a well-decorated career happened accidentally, "I definitely had no intention of making a career out of poetry. When I was 19, a friend invited me to an open mic called Da Poetry Lounge in Los Angeles. The talent was absolutely incredible and it was such an inspiring environment that I never left." Initially, Schmalholz's delivery style was that of an a cappella rapper, but he later found that audiences identified his performances more with spoken word poetry and he now considers himself primarily a poet when performing.

IN-Q delved deeper into becoming a songwriter for the music industry after receiving a publishing deal with Rock Mafia. On his songwriting process, Schmalholz says, "With us, every song is different. Sometimes the artist comes in and we write together, sometimes we collaborate with other songwriters, and sometimes we write in studio and get the song placed."

== Awards and accolades ==
IN-Q's songwriting credits include collaborating on Grammy-nominated and multi-platinum tracks for Miley Cyrus ("Forgiveness And Love" on the Can't Be Tamed album), Aloe Blacc ("Ticking Bomb" on the Wake Me Up EP), and Selena Gomez & the Scene ("Love You like a Love Song" on the album, When the Sun Goes Down).

IN-Q has appeared on Russell Simmons' Def Poetry Jam, performed for Quincy Jones, Hillary Clinton, former US President Barack Obama, and performed a live poetry concert with American musician Mike Posner and indie folk band Magic Giant. Antonina Armato, Tim James, the co-founder of Rock Mafia, and Schmalholz won a songwriting BMI Award for Selena Gomez and the Scene's "Love You Like a Love Song."

In 2017, he was named one of the top creatives on Oprah's SuperSoul 100 list. That same year, he wrote and narrated an ad for A&E as a part of the network's marketing campaign that sought to align the A&E brand with culture and diversity.

IN-Q was invited by renowned non-profit TED to join the panel of speakers in 2017 for an event hosted at IBM that explored the relationship between technology and humanity. His recent videos "The Only Reason We're Alive" and "The Most Important Vote We'll Ever Cast" went viral and have over six million views combined.

== Songwriting discography ==
indicates an un-credited vocal contribution.

Year	Artist	Album	Song	Co-written with
2010	Miley Cyrus	Can't Be Tamed	"Forgiveness and Love"	Miley Cyrus, Timothy Price, Antonina Armato
2011	Selena Gomez & the Scene	When the Sun Goes Down	"Love You Like a Love Song"	Timothy Price, Antonina Armato
2013	Selena Gomez	Stars Dance	"Stars Dance"	Timothy Price, Antonina Armato
2013	Aloe Blacc	Lift Your Spirit	"Ticking Timebomb"	Egbert Dawkins III, Timothy Price, Antonina Armato
2014	China Anne McClain	Non-album single	"DNA"	Jonathan Vella, Thomas Sturges, Timothy Price, Antonina Armato
2015	Selena Gomez	Revival	"Revival"	Julia Michaels, Justin Tranter, Timothy Price, Antonina Armato, Chauncey Hollis
2015	Selena Gomez	Revival	"Rise"	Selena Gomez, Timothy Price, Antonina Armato
2016	Zhu	Generationwhy	"Good Life"	Steven Zhu, Georgia Nott, Caleb Nott
2017	Foster the People	Sacred Hearts Club	"Doing It for the Money"	Mark Foster, Isom Innis, Ryan Tedder
2019	Foster the People	TBA	"Style"	Mark Foster, Sean Cimimo, Rami Yacoub, Alexander Payami
