= Love You like a Love Song =

2011 single by Selena Gomez & the Scene

Single by Selena Gomez & the Scene

from the album When the Sun Goes Down
- Released: June 17, 2011
- Recorded: December 2010
- Studio: Rock Mafia (Santa Monica, California)
- Genre: Dance-pop; electropop
- Length: 3:08
- Label: Hollywood
- Songwriters: Antonina Armato; Tim James; Adam Schmalholz
- Producers: Rock Mafia; Devrim Karaoglu

Selena Gomez & the Scene singles chronology
"Who Says" (2011)	"Love You like a Love Song" (2011)	"Hit the Lights" (2012)

Music video
- "Love You like a Love Song" on YouTube

"Love You like a Love Song" is a song by American band Selena Gomez & the Scene recorded for their third studio album When the Sun Goes Down (2011). It was released as the second single from the album internationally. The song was released for digital download on June 17, 2011, and serviced to mainstream radios on August 16, 2011, in the United States, through Hollywood Records.

It was written by Antonina Armato and Tim James while both receive production credits under the stage-name Rock Mafia. Additional songwriting comes from Adam Schmalholz, while Devrim Karaoglu co-produced the track. The song, according to Gomez, was meant to sound different from her previous material, achieving a "high fashion" sound. "Love You like a Love Song" is a midtempo dance-pop and electropop song with a Euro disco rhythm. The lyrics deal with the feeling of being in love early on in a relationship.

"Love You like a Love Song" was a success in North America, peaking at number 22 on the Billboard Hot 100 and number ten on the Canadian Hot 100. It stands as the band's most successful single in the United States, lasting the longest on the chart, selling more than two million copies and earning a seven-times platinum certification by the Recording Industry Association of America (RIAA). The song peaked at number one in Russia, inside the top ten in Hungary, Mexico and Slovakia, and earned gold certifications in Australia and Sweden, and platinum ones in Norway, Spain, Denmark and the UK. In 2022, Billboard ranked the song as the biggest hit that peaked at number 22.

The music video for "Love You like a Love Song" was directed by Geremy Jasper and Georgie Greville. It features Gomez performing the song at a Japanese karaoke bar while scenes of the band performing in different settings are intercut through the video. The video received controversy for the use of paint, later proven to be non-toxic, on a horse. Despite the use of non-toxic paint and supervision by the Humane Society, the scenes with the horses were removed in the final edit.

== Background and release ==
"Love You like a Love Song" was written and produced by Antonina Armato and Tim James, while they are credited under the stage-name Rock Mafia for the production. Armato and James have collaborated on The Scene's previous songs including "Naturally" and "Tell Me Something I Don't Know" (Kiss & Tell, 2009). A month after the release of "Who Says", there was already talk of a release of a new single, to be called "Love You like a Song", a rumor that arose when the provisional name of the third studio album was still Otherside. On April 30, 2011, the production/songwriting duo, through Twitter, 'confirmed' "Love You like a Song" was not correct and the correct name of the song is "Love You like a Love Song" or "Lovesong". In May, the official name of the song, "Love You like a Love Song", was confirmed.

In an interview with Billboard, Gomez described as a "one of those tracks that's addictive because it's kind of repetitive in the best way. It's one of those songs that you can't get out of your head." In an interview with another publication, Gomez explained what she expected from the record: "This song is fun and I wanted it to be really high fashion and different and I think we have accomplished that. It's basically talking about how crazy you are about someone whenever it's the beginning. It's the honeymoon stage if you will." "Love You like a Love Song" was released as the second single from When the Sun Goes Down (2011), after the international success of "Who Says", on June 17, 2011, through digital distribution. The song was serviced to contemporary hit radio airplay on August 16, 2011, in the United States.

== Composition ==
"Love You like a Love Song"
A sample of "Love You like a Love Song", a mid-tempo dance-pop and electropop song that utilizes a Euro disco rhythm.

"Love You like a Love Song" is three minutes and eight seconds long. Armato and James collaborated with Paul Palmer on the song's mix, which was orchestrated at Rock Mafia Studios in Santa Monica, California, while Steve Hammons serves as the mix engineer. Hammons and Ross Hogarth were signed as the song's engineers, while Adam Comstock serves as the second engineer. Brooke Adams performed background vocals with Armato and James. Tim Pierce contributed guitars. The song was then digitally edited by James and Nigel Lundemo. Musically, according to the digital music sheet published at Musicnotes.com by Universal Music Publishing Group, the song is set in common time and moves through a moderate tempo, having a tempo of 117 beats per minute. It is written in the key of C♯ minor. Gomez's vocals range from a low register of E_{3} to a high register of C♯_{5}. It has a basic descending fifths sequence of C♯m-F♯m-B-E-A-D♯dim-G♯7 with the eighth chord being G♯ in the verses and C♯m in the chorus as its chord progression. It changes to A-E-B-C♯m-A-E-G♯7-G♯7 in the bridge.

"Love You like a Love Song" is a mid-tempo dance-pop and electropop song incorporating a Euro disco rhythm and pulsing beats. Lyrically, "Love You like a Love Song" is about a relationship in its honeymoon phase. Kitty Empire of The Guardian commented the song "combines a lyrical weariness beyond her years with some acrylic pump action".

== Critical reception ==
The song received generally mixed reviews from music critics, who criticized its lyrics and Gomez's monotone vocals. John Bergstrom of PopMatters expressed a mixed opinion about the song, writing it "benefits from a great title, and the squishy Eurodisco rhythm is credible, catchy and even sultry. But it's all undone by a stuttering, Max Headroom non-chorus."

Victoria Meng of TheCelebrityCafe, in her review of the single, found faults with the lyrics and the production. Calling the production "sub-par", Meng criticized it for sounding "mechanical" due to the electronic nature, writing "a love song shouldn't sound mechanical unless it's deliberately meant to be subversive and to highlight dark, pathological obsessions like in many of Lady Gaga's songs." Meng also criticized it for the use of monotone vocals and Auto-Tune, in regards to a love song which she claims should be "passionate". Meng found the lyrics to be "mediocre", writing "to surround them with a beautiful tune" would help them stand out. Blair Kelly of musicOMH expressed similar feelings towards the song; she deemed it "forgettable" and stated it and "Bang Bang Bang" were both "wannabe electro-pop songs which lack both lyrical merit and a really catchy hook to make up for it".

In 2017, Alex Frank from Pitchfork called the song "a cult karaoke classic".

== Commercial performance ==
"Love You like a Love Song" debuted at number 72 on the US Billboard Hot 100 issued for July 9, 2011 following the release of When The Sun Goes Down. It entered the top 40 two weeks later at number 35, becoming Selena Gomez & the Scene's sixth top 40 hit. It exited the region two weeks later and proceeded to hover below it for the next four months. In mid-December, the track re-entered the top 40, and proceeded to climb until the issue for March 3, 2012, when it peaked at number 22. With 38 weeks spent on the chart, it is Selena Gomez & the Scene's longest-charting single. The track also enjoyed success on radio charts in the US, peaking at number six on the Pop Airplay chart and number 13 on the Adult Pop Airplay chart. It marked the group's first top ten hit on the former and their first entry on the latter. It had sold 2.8 million copies as of May 2017, and was certified seven-times Platinum by the Recording Industry Association of America (RIAA) in July 2024, making it Gomez's highest-selling song in the country. In Canada, "Love You like a Love Song" entered the Canadian Hot 100 at number 64 on July 9, 2011. The song rose to number 21 in the following week. It ascended and descended inside the top 30 for eighteen weeks until it peaked at number 10 on November 19, 2011. The song lasted another fifteen weeks inside the top 30 and exited the charts after 42 weeks.

In Belgium, "Love You like a Love Song" peaked at number 15 and charted for thirteen weeks. In New Zealand, the song entered the singles chart at number 34 and peaked at number 21 two weeks later. In Australia, it peaked at number 48 and, despite lasting two weeks on the chart, was certified gold for shipments of 35,000 units by Australian Recording Industry Association (ARIA). In Sweden, the song peaked at number 41 on the singles chart and earned a gold certification by the Swedish Recording Industry Association (GLF) for shipments of 10,000 units. The song showed similar success across Europe, peaking in the lower end of the top fifty in several other countries, though it went to number one in Russia staying 20 weeks atop, and reached the top three in several other Eastern European countries. In France, one year after its release, the single entered at number 68 on June 9, 2012 and peaked at number 17 on September 8, 2012, three months later. It became Gomez's first entry in the French Singles Chart and the only entry for The Scene; it would remain her longest-running single in the charts with 34 weeks spent until Taki Taki (2018) with DJ Snake, which spent 57 weeks. It is Gomez's biggest hit as a lead artist in the country. It also reached in both Taiwan and the People's Republic of China.

== Music video ==
=== Background and synopsis ===
The music video was directed by Geremy Jasper and Georgie Greville, who previously worked with Goldfrapp and Florence & The Machine. Gomez considered the video as "the craziest video I've ever done", and commented, "[s]ometimes when you're in love, there are things you can't really explain and it doesn't make sense. That's how I feel when I'm in love." The video was released on June 23, 2011, on VEVO. Around the same time, the video would play during commercial breaks on Disney Channel.

As of October 2025, the video has been viewed more than 800 million times.

It begins with the singer at a Japanese karaoke bar, watching a man sing the band's previous single "Naturally" off-key before he wanders off stage, a scene criticized for being similar to the opening scene of Maroon 5's video for their 2004 single "Sunday Morning". Gomez, who wears a golden disco-style dress, is called to the stage, where she starts to sing the song. As the first line begins, the karaoke machine begins projecting various images of the band in different settings. The first set features Gomez wearing a long black dress with poker-straight hair on a violet-sanded beach. The close ups with her dark sleeveless top, hairstyle, hair color, goth like makeup, and with her hands gesturing towards the camera bear a striking resemblance with Avril Lavigne's Complicated music video. She then walks the beach with a long-haired blond male hippie (actor/model Oliver Seitz), and lays in the sand while he plays sitar and time-lapsed clouds speed away overhead. In the chorus, many TV screens show images of Gomez in drag looking similar to 1980s icon Max Headroom.

During the second verse of the song, Gomez and the pianist are in a heavenly cloud-scape, both dressed in a style inspired by the 1984 film Amadeus. She sings atop the triangular piano while he plays. She then glances at a TV screen displaying the next scene. Donning 1950s dress, Gomez rides in the passenger seat of a convertible car driven by a greaser, played by actor Charan Andreas on a Tron-esque computer grid in outer space. The song's breakdown takes place in a large field of fuchsia wheat. Gomez sports a bejeweled bustier, black tutu, and black thigh-high boots while playing piñata with a pink lightsaber. She is surrounded by a Mariachi band consisting of The Scene and others playing Roland AX-7 synth keytars and a Yamaha WX5 wind controller. In the video's conclusion, The Scene comes into the bar to watch their lead singer finish her song, as the men from the fantasy sequences are shown to be in the audience as well. Gomez then bows to applause from the small audience. The beach was filmed in Malibu, California.

In a May 2018 interview with Victoria Rodriguez of Seventeen, actor Timothy Granaderos, who portrays the character of Monty in the Gomez-produced Netflix drama 13 Reasons Why, confirmed he played the purple-masked mariachi band member, who plays the Yamaha WX5 wind controller, in the video.

=== PETA controversy and reception ===
Before the official release of the music video, a leaked photo from the set of Gomez, the hippie, and two pink-colored horses drew controversy during production. Although the horses were colored using a nontoxic water-soluble vegetable powder, when singer and PETA supporter Pink saw the photo, she assumed the horses had been colored traditionally using toxic paints or dyes. Pink criticized the video, which had not even been released, as "stupid". On her arrival to the video's set, Gomez was reportedly surprised to see the horses were physically colorized, having assumed their color would be added in post-production.

According to Gomez, she "was not so comfortable with the whole concept" of having horses in the video, and it was later announced the animals would not appear in the final cut of the video, despite on-set supervision from an official of the Humane Society and the horses not having been harmed or endangered in any way. James Dihn of MTV Newsroom commented Gomez was not the first celebrity to be criticized by PETA, naming Britney Spears and her music video for "Circus" (2008), as well as 50 Cent and Lady Gaga, as examples. Following the release on VEVO, Becky Bain of Idolator noted "most of these scenes have absolutely nothing to do with one another", but considered it "pretty entertaining even without pink horses", joking about the PETA controversy. Jocelyn Vena of MTV summarized her review of the music video saying, "Selena Gomez may have been born in 1992, but that doesn't mean that the teen queen can't get a little nostalgic for the '80s."

== Live performances ==
Gomez performed the song on Good Morning America on June 17, 2011. The song has also been performed on the UK program Daybreak on July 8, 2011. She also performed it at the Teen Choice Awards on Sunday, August 7, 2011. Gomez performed the song on "The Tonight Show with Jay Leno" on September 19, 2011. The song was also performed on The Ellen DeGeneres Show on November 17, 2011. Gomez and her band performed the song at their first headlining tour We Own the Night Tour.

The band performed the song at the 2011 Teen Choice Awards following their win for "Best Love Song".

The song was later featured in the setlist of Gomez's second solo tour Revival Tour.

== Track listing ==
Remixes EP

1. "Love You like a Love Song" (Radio Version) - 3:09
2. "Love You like a Love Song" (Radio Instrumental) - 3:06
3. "Love You like a Love Song" (The Alias Radio Mix) - 3:28
4. "Love You like a Love Song" (The Alias Club Mix) - 5:47

When the Sun Goes Down – iTunes deluxe edition
No.	Title	Length
13.	"Love You like a Love Song" (Dave Audé Radio Mix)	3:17
14.	"Love You like a Love Song" (Dave Audé Club Mix)	6:28
15.	"Love You like a Love Song" (Jump Smokers Radio Remix)	4:11
16.	"Love You like a Love Song" (Jump Smokers Club Remix)	4:36
17.	"Love You like a Love Song" (DJ Escape & Tony Coluccio Radio Remix)	3:16
18.	"Love You like a Love Song" (DJ Escape & Tony Coluccio Club Remix)	6:38
19.	"Love You like a Love Song" (Mixin Marc & Tony Svejda Radio Remix)	3:59
20.	"Love You like a Love Song" (Mixin Marc & Tony Svejda Club Remix)	5:49

== Credits and personnel ==
Credits are adapted from the liner notes of When the Sun Goes Down.

- Rock Mafia – producer, mixing
- Devrim Karaoglu – co-producer
- Antonina Armato – songwriter
- Tim James – songwriter, digital editing
- Adam Schmalholz – songwriter
- Paul Palmer – mixing
- Steve Hammons – engineer, mixing engineer
- Ross Hogarth – engineer
- Adam Comstock – second engineer
- Tim Pierce – guitars
- Nigel Lendemo – digital editing

== Cover versions, parodies and usage in media ==
In 2012, Naya Rivera performed the song as her character Santana Lopez in the third-season episode "Prom-asaurus" of the television series Glee.

RuPaul's Drag Race contestant Willam Belli parodied the song on his album The Wreckoning, entitled "Love You like a Big Schlong".

The song was featured in the episode "No, You Can't Sit With Us" of Suburgatory.

The song was covered by Marshall Williams and Kelli Berglund in the Disney Channel television film How to Build a Better Boy, as their characters Albert Banks and Mae Hartley respectively.

The song was featured in the 2012 dance video game Just Dance 4.

In 2014, Cats on Trees released a cover version of the song. It charted on the SNEP, the official French Singles Chart peaking number 44 and 43 at Wallonia.

In 2015, Sami released a cover version of the song.

The song was featured in episode 7 of the Netflix series Ginny and Georgia.

In 2025, Bleood heavily sampled the song in I Kno U Kno Wat U Did (stylized in all lowercase).

== Awards and nominations ==
Year	Award	Category	Result
2011	Teen Choice Awards	Choice Music: Love Song	Won
2012	MTV Video Music Awards	Best Female Video	Nominated
2012	Hollywood Teen TV Awards	Song Of The Year	Nominated
2012	MuchMusic Video Awards	Best International Video: Group	Nominated

== Charts ==
=== Weekly charts ===
2011–2012 weekly chart performance for "Love You like a Love Song"
Chart (2011–2012)	Peak position
Australia (ARIA)	48
Belgium (Ultratop 50 Flanders)	15
Belgium (Ultratip Bubbling Under Wallonia)	14
Brazil Hot 100 Airplay (Billboard)	15
Canada Hot 100 (Billboard)	10
CIS Airplay (TopHit)	1
Czech Republic Airplay (ČNS IFPI)	13
Denmark (Tracklisten)	31
France (SNEP)	17
Hungary (Dance Top 40)	11
Hungary (Rádiós Top 40)	2
Ireland (IRMA)	49
Lebanon (Lebanese Top 20)	15
Mexico Airplay (Billboard)	16
New Zealand (Recorded Music NZ)	21
Norway (VG-lista)	14
Romania Airplay (Romanian Top 100)	70
Russia Airplay (TopHit)	1
Spain (Promusicae)	41
Sweden (Sverigetopplistan)	41
Ukraine Airplay (TopHit)	4
UK Singles (Official Charts)	58
US Billboard Hot 100	22
US Adult Pop Airplay (Billboard)	13
US Dance Club Songs (Billboard)	1
US Latin Pop Airplay (Billboard)	21
US Pop Airplay (Billboard)	6
US Rhythmic Airplay (Billboard)	36

2024-2026 weekly chart performance for "Love You like a Love Song"
Chart (2024-2026)	Peak position
Kazakhstan Airplay (TopHit)	31
Lithuania Airplay (TopHit)	96
Moldova Airplay (TopHit)	81
Ukraine Airplay (TopHit)	160

=== Monthly charts ===
2011 monthly chart performance for "Love You like a Love Song"
Chart (2011)	Peak position
CIS Airplay (TopHit)	1
Russia Airplay (TopHit)	1
Ukraine Airplay (TopHit)	5

2024 monthly chart performance for "Love You like a Love Song"
Chart (2024)	Peak position
Kazakhstan Airplay (TopHit)	36

2025 monthly chart performance for "Love You like a Love Song"
Chart (2025)	Peak position
Kazakhstan Airplay (TopHit)	53

=== Year-end charts ===
2011 year-end chart positions for "Love You like a Love Song"
Chart (2011)	Position
Belgium (Ultratop Flanders)	89
Canada (Canadian Hot 100)	48
CIS Airplay (TopHit)	19
Russia Airplay (TopHit)	21
Russia Digital Singles (2M)	2
Ukraine Airplay (TopHit)	28

2012 year-end chart positions for "Love You like a Love Song"
Chart (2012)	Position
Canada (Canadian Hot 100)	46
CIS Airplay (TopHit)	40
France (SNEP)	83
Hungary (Rádiós Top 40)	29
Russia Airplay (TopHit)	44
Ukraine Airplay (TopHit)	46
US Billboard Hot 100	83
US Mainstream Top 40 (Billboard)	37

2013 year-end chart performance for "Love You like a Love Song"
Chart (2013)	Position
Ukraine Airplay (TopHit)	127

2023 year-end chart performance for "Love You like a Love Song"
Chart (2023)	Position
Kazakhstan Airplay (TopHit)	183

2024 year-end chart performance for "Love You like a Love Song"
Chart (2024)	Position
Hungary (Rádiós Top 40)	85
Kazakhstan Airplay (TopHit)	33

2025 year-end chart performance for "Love You like a Love Song"
Chart (2025)	Position
Kazakhstan Airplay (TopHit)	81

== Certifications ==
Certifications for "Love You like a Love Song"
Region	Certification	Certified units/sales
Australia (ARIA)	Gold	35,000^{^}
Austria (IFPI Austria)	Gold	15,000^{*}
Denmark (IFPI Danmark)	Platinum	90,000^{‡}
Germany (BVMI)	Gold	300,000^{‡}
Italy (FIMI)	Gold	50,000^{‡}
New Zealand (RMNZ)	2× Platinum	60,000^{‡}
Norway (IFPI Norway)	Platinum	10,000^{*}
Russia (NFPF) Ringtone	Platinum	200,000^{*}
Spain (Promusicae)	Platinum	60,000^{‡}
Sweden (GLF)	Gold	20,000^{‡}
United Kingdom (BPI)	Platinum	600,000^{‡}
United States (RIAA)	7× Platinum	7,000,000^{‡}
Streaming
Norway (IFPI Norway)	Platinum	3,000,000^{†}
^{*} Sales figures based on certification alone.^{^} Shipments figures based on certification alone.^{‡} Sales+streaming figures based on certification alone.^{†} Streaming-only figures based on certification alone.

== Release history ==
List of release dates with formats and record labels
Country	Date	Format	Label
United States	June 17, 2011	Digital download	Hollywood Records
Worldwide	June 17, 2011	Digital download	Hollywood Records
Australia	June 20, 2011	Contemporary hit radio	Hollywood Records
Taiwan	June 22, 2011	Digital download	Universal Music Taiwan
United States	August 16, 2011	Contemporary hit radio	Hollywood Records
Worldwide	August 22, 2011	Digital remixes EP	Hollywood Records

== See also ==
- List of number-one dance singles of 2011 (U.S.)
- List of number-one songs of 2011 (Russia)
