= Loyal Like Sid & Nancy =

Single by Foster the People

from the album Sacred Hearts Club
- Released: June 30, 2017
- Recorded: 2016
- Genre: Synth-pop; indie electronic; electronic
- Length: 4:40
- Label: Columbia
- Songwriters: Mark Foster; Isom Innis
- Producer: Isom Innis

Foster the People singles chronology
"Doing It for the Money" (2017)	"Loyal Like Sid & Nancy" (2017)	"Sit Next to Me" (2017)

"Loyal Like Sid & Nancy" is a song by American indie pop band Foster the People from their third studio album, Sacred Hearts Club (2017). It was released on June 30, 2017, as the album's second single.

== Background and release ==
Mark Foster revealed "Loyal Like Sid & Nancy" was the song from Sacred Hearts Club that took them the longest to finish: "The music went through a lot of iterations before we finally settled on a three act play sort of format. But I went particularly insane writing the lyrics to that one. Also, it was important to me that the vocal delivery was right. The vocal needed to be sensual to offset the aggression of the lyrical message and the beat." He also mentioned the political structure of the song's lyrics as another struggle to get it done: "The political message posed another challenge. Especially when it came to touching on issues like the murder of Eric Garner and Black Lives Matter. And the new US policy on accepting refugees. It was a delicate dance to get these points across in the right way." The title of the song refers to the tragic relationship between the Sex Pistols' Sid Vicious and his girlfriend, Nancy Spungen.

The song was released as the second single from the album on June 30, 2017 through many streaming services, including Spotify. It was also made available as a pre-order track for whoever purchased the album on iTunes.

== Composition ==
"Loyal Like Sid & Nancy" is an electronic song with hip hop influences. It was composed by the band's members Mark Foster and Isom Innis, the latter was also responsible for producing it. Innis said the song was originally an "atonal dance track" and was later rearranged by Foster: "Mark took it in the studio, added a chord progression, arranged a song that was really meant to be in the dance world. And that's when it started to transform." The last bridge of the song was inspired by Gene Wilder's memorable quotes from Willy Wonka & the Chocolate Factory. Foster revealed that the spoken-word piece had different lyrical variations, including samples from "Pure Imagination" that were later scrapped.
