= Hit the Lights (Selena Gomez & the Scene song) =

Single by Selena Gomez & the Scene

from the album When the Sun Goes Down
- Released: January 20, 2012
- Recorded: November 2010
- Studio: Dreamlab Studios (Los Angeles, CA)
- Genre: Dance-pop; synth-pop
- Length: 3:14
- Label: Hollywood
- Songwriter(s): Leah Haywood; Daniel James; Tony Nilsson
- Producer(s): Dreamlab

Selena Gomez & the Scene singles chronology
"Love You like a Love Song" (2011)	"Hit the Lights" (2012)

Music videos
- "Hit the Lights" (version 1) on YouTube "Hit the Lights" (version 2) on YouTube

"Hit the Lights" is a song by American band Selena Gomez & the Scene from their third and final studio album When the Sun Goes Down (2011). The song was written by Leah Haywood, Daniel James and Tony Nilsson, while production of the song was handled by Haywood and James under their production name Dreamlab. Musically, "Hit the Lights" is a dance-pop and synth-pop song. Lyrically, the song speaks about living in the moment and taking risks. An international remixes EP was released on January 20, 2012, for the song's single release. It officially impacted Top 40/Mainstream radio in the U.S. on April 10, 2012. It was released as the third and final single from the album, as well as the final single released by the group to date. It was also the only single released by the group that was excluded from Selena Gomez's 2014 compilation album For You.

== Background ==
"Hit the Lights" was written by Leah Haywood, Daniel James, and Tony Nilsson, while the production was helmed by Haywood and Daniel Pringle. The song was recorded at Dreamlab Studios in Los Angeles, California while the mixing was done at MixStar Studios in Virginia Beach, Virginia. In an interview with Billboard magazine, Selena Gomez explained every track on the song's parent album. In describing "Hit the Lights" she commented that the song's lyrics spoke about things relatable to everyone, commenting "It's kind of one of those songs about living in the moment while keeping it a big huge summer dance track."

== Composition ==
"Hit the Lights" is a dance-pop and synth-pop track that runs for three minutes and fourteen seconds. The song is written in the key of G major and is set in time signature of common time with a moderately fast tempo of 130 beats per minute. Gomez's vocal range spans from the low note of D_{3} to the high note of B_{4}. The song has a basic sequence of Em–Csus2–Em–Gmaj7–Bm/F# as its chord progression. The lyrics of "Hit the Lights" displays more "maturity" than the band's previous recordings. It is also musically different than the music of When the Sun Goes Down, with critics noting it as a song playable in dance clubs.

== Critical reception ==
Tim Sendra of AllMusic praised her vocals on the song, commenting that she "comes on like a convincing disco diva on 'Hit the Lights'." Blair Kelly of musicOMH followed in the praise of the song as a "massive club hit" but was mixed in noting that "in the surroundings of the rest of the album it doesn't make sense." Idolator's Mike Wass called the song "[an] underrated gem [which] delivers important life lessons without skimping on a catchy chorus or perky synths".

== Music videos ==
The video for "Hit the Lights" premiered on Vevo on November 16, 2011, and was directed by Philip Andelman.

The video begins with Gomez singing in front of a lime green background. Gomez, as well as her band members and a few other people are shown in a wheat field, attempting to keep several oversized balloons from touching the ground. Next, the group are wandering through a corn field and begin dancing and jumping, with Gomez singing the song's chorus. The group briefly appears in a pumpkin patch outside of the cornfield, throwing and smashing some pumpkins. Later, as the sun is beginning to set, the group sits on the back of a pickup truck, eating watermelon. The truck begins to issue a large amount of smoke.

As the second playing of the chorus begins, it is shown to be night, and the group are on a street in a neighborhood, where they are dancing while holding flashlights. The group proceeds to a house party. Shortly afterwards, the group are in a dark forest, where there are several disco balls hanging from trees. Gomez then appears surrounded by several pink balloons, wearing pink and yellow sunglasses, as well as in an empty and dark football field. A few people are shown jumping into a pool before returning to the dark street where they begin dancing with sparklers and fireworks go off around them. Finally, the group begins dancing and running through a brightly lit city, similar to Times Square as the video ends.

On April 19, 2012, a second version of the video was released with a few scenes from the original version.

=== Reception ===
Jeff Benjamin of Billboard magazine commented that "Gomez remains as innocently cute as ever with sunglasses too big for her face in the opening scene. In fact, the most controversial moment of the video comes when Selena and her posse smash a pumpkin to bits. Not a girl, definitely..... not yet a woman (she's still partying in a football stadium). Is Selena's own 'Slave 4 U' moment coming soon? From this video, it looks like the 19 year-old still has a little time before she shedding her squeaky clean image—if she plans to at all." A writer from The Huffington Post took a liking to the song's music video, writing that it "captures the feeling of being young and carefree, and is all about having a good time with your friends. (And having fun in a pile of pink balloons.)"

== Live performances ==
The band has performed "Hit the Lights" on the We Own the Night Tour, and it is the second song performed after the Dave Audé remix version of "A Year Without Rain" and before "Summer's Not Hot". During the performance, Gomez wears a gold dress and her movements are improvised. On July 24, 2011, the band performed the song "Hit the Lights" at the O.C. Fair. On the day of the MTV Europe Music Awards, Gomez performed "Hit the Lights" in a bedazzled purple jumpsuit with her band.

== Track listing ==
- Digital download
1. "Hit the Lights" – 3:14
- Remixes EP
1. "Hit the Lights" – 3:14
2. "Hit the Lights" (MD's Radio Mix) – 3:06
3. "Hit the Lights" (MD's Remix) – 6:05
4. "Hit the Lights" (Azzido da Bass Radio Mix) – 3:07
5. "Hit the Lights" (Azzido da Bass Extended Mix) – 4:03
6. "Hit the Lights" (Azzido da Bass Club Mix) – 4:59
- Dave Audé Radio Remix – Single
1. "Hit the Lights" (Dave Audé Radio Remix) – 3:26
- Dave Audé Club Remix – Single
1. "Hit the Lights" (Dave Audé Club Remix) – 6:13
- Dave Audé Dub Remix – Single
1. "Hit the Lights" (Dave Audé Dub Remix) – 5:52

== Credits and personnel ==
Recording and mixing

- Recorded at Dreamlab Studios in Los Angeles, California
- Mixed at MixStar Studios in Virginia Beach, Virginia

Personnel

- Vocals – Selena Gomez
- Production – Dreamlab
- Songwriting – Leah Haywood, Daniel James, Tony Nilsson
- Serban Ghenea – mixing
- Engineering – John Hanes, Phil Seaford

Credits adapted from the liner notes of When the Sun Goes Down, Hollywood Records.

== Awards and nominations ==
Year	Award	Category	Result
2012	Teen Choice Awards	Choice Single: Group	Nominated

== Chart performance ==
"Hit the Lights" first charted in Belgium at number fifty-four on the Ultratip Flanders chart. The next week, the song climbed to number twenty-nine. The song also debuted on the Canadian Hot 100 at number ninety-three on the week ending December 3, 2011. It has sold 554,000 copies in the US as of July 2015. The song did not chart on the Billboard Hot 100, but landed at number 3 on the Bubbling Under Hot 100. The song became Selena Gomez & the Scene's first single to fail to chart in the Billboard Hot 100.

== Charts and certifications ==
=== Weekly charts ===
Chart (2011–2012)	Peak position
Belgium (Ultratip Bubbling Under Flanders)	11
Canada (Canadian Hot 100)	55
CIS Airplay (TopHit)	63
Russia Airplay (TopHit)	83
Slovakia (Rádio Top 100)	33
US Bubbling Under Hot 100 (Billboard)	3
US Pop Airplay (Billboard)	44

=== Certifications ===
Region	Certification	Certified units/sales
United States (RIAA)	Platinum	1,000,000^{‡}
^{‡} Sales+streaming figures based on certification alone.

== Release history ==
List of release dates with formats and record labels
Country	Date	Format	Label
Netherlands	January 20, 2012	Digital Remixes EP	Hollywood Records
Switzerland	January 20, 2012	Digital Remixes EP	Hollywood Records
France	January 23, 2012	Digital Remixes EP	Hollywood Records
Finland	January 23, 2012	Digital Remixes EP	Hollywood Records
Luxembourg	January 23, 2012	Digital Remixes EP	Hollywood Records
Portugal	January 23, 2012	Digital Remixes EP	Hollywood Records
Singapore	January 23, 2012	Digital Remixes EP	Hollywood Records
Belgium	January 23, 2012	Digital Remixes EP	Hollywood Records
Germany	January 27, 2012	Digital Remixes EP	Hollywood Records
Austria	January 27, 2012	Digital Remixes EP	Hollywood Records
Canada	January 31, 2012	Digital Remixes EP	Hollywood Records
United States	April 10, 2012	Top 40/Mainstream radio	Hollywood Records
