= Sit Next to Me =

2017 single by Foster the People

Single by Foster the People

from the album Sacred Hearts Club
- Released: July 13, 2017
- Recorded: 2016
- Genre: Indie pop; disco; funk; neo-psychedelia
- Length: 4:03
- Label: Columbia
- Songwriters: Mark Foster; Josh Abraham; Lars Stalfors; Johnny Newman; Oliver Goldstein
- Producers: Josh Abraham; Oligee

Foster the People singles chronology
"Loyal Like Sid & Nancy" (2017)	"Sit Next to Me" (2017)	"Pay the Man (Remix)" (2017)

"Sit Next to Me" is a song by the American indietronica band Foster the People. The song is featured as the third track on the band's third studio album Sacred Hearts Club and was released as the record's third single by Columbia Records on July 13, 2017. "Sit Next to Me" (Versions) was recorded on October 13, 2017 and featured a radio edit, an acoustic version, and a reworked version of the song. It was then released to US modern rock stations. The song was well-received by music critics, who complimented its production and catchiness.

== Music video ==
The official video for "Sit Next to Me" was directed by Fourclops and Brinton Bryan and was released on November 10, 2017. The video features 100 posts from Instagram influencers and celebrities and also includes submissions from Foster the People fans all over the world. A cardboard cut-out of Baloony from Phineas and Ferb is seen in one of the Instagram videos. "It was fun to play with the premise of a music video that hijacks your social feed," said director Fourclops in a prepared statement. "Instagram is a major destination for consuming media these days, and it made for an exciting setting for our video. We asked ourselves, what would it look like if all of the accounts within Instagram become transformed by a song?"

== Track listing ==
Download
No.	Title	Length
1.	"Sit Next to Me"	4:03

"Sit Next to Me" (Versions)
No.	Title	Length
1.	"Sit Next to Me" (Radio edit)	3:22
2.	"Sit Next to Me" (Acoustic)	4:18
3.	"Sit Next to Me" (Rework)	5:32

== Personnel ==
Foster the People

- Mark Foster – lead vocals, bass, synthesizer, guitar, engineer

Additional personnel

- Oliver Goldstein – drum programming, piano, synthesizer, guitar, bass, programming, producer
- Josh Abraham – producer
- Lars Stalfors – additional production, mixing
- Cameron Graham – engineer
- Isom Innis – engineer
- Dave Cerminara – additional engineering

== Charts ==
=== Weekly charts ===
Chart (2017–18)	Peak position
Canada Hot 100 (Billboard)	68
Canada AC (Billboard)	24
Canada CHR/Top 40 (Billboard)	34
Canada Hot AC (Billboard)	20
Canada Rock (Billboard)	18
Croatia Airplay (HRT)	54
Czech Republic Airplay (ČNS IFPI)	16
Czech Republic Singles Digital (ČNS IFPI)	73
Ecuador (National-Report)	20
Iceland (RÚV)	2
Netherlands Single Tip (MegaCharts)	11
US Billboard Hot 100	42
US Adult Contemporary (Billboard)	21
US Adult Pop Airplay (Billboard)	8
US Hot Rock & Alternative Songs (Billboard)	5
US Pop Airplay (Billboard)	20
US Rock & Alternative Airplay (Billboard)	2
Venezuela (National-Report)	49

=== Year-end charts ===
Chart (2018)	Position
Iceland (Plötutíóindi)	64
US Adult Top 40 (Billboard)	22
US Hot Rock Songs (Billboard)	6
US Radio Songs (Billboard)	66
US Rock Airplay (Billboard)	2

== Certifications ==
Region	Certification	Certified units/sales
Canada (Music Canada)	Platinum	80,000^{‡}
New Zealand (RMNZ)	Platinum	30,000^{‡}
United States (RIAA)	4× Platinum	4,000,000^{‡}
^{‡} Sales+streaming figures based on certification alone.

== Release history ==
Country	Date	Format	Label
Various	July 13, 2017	Download	Columbia
United States	September 5, 2017	Modern rock radio	Columbia
North America	October 13, 2017	Download	Columbia
United States	January 22, 2018	Hot adult contemporary	Columbia
United States	February 13, 2018	Contemporary hit radio	Columbia
