= Sacred Hearts Club =

Studio album by Foster the People
- Released: July 21, 2017
- Recorded: May 2015 – April 2017
- Studios: The Bank (Burbank); Pulse (Los Angeles); Palmquist (Los Angeles); Bronson Island (Los Angeles); Rodeo (Santa Monica)
- Genres: Indie pop; neo-psychedelia; indie electronic
- Length: 41:37
- Label: Columbia
- Producers: Josh Abraham; Rob Cohen; Mark Foster; John Hill; Isom Innis; Austin Mensales; Frans Mernick; Oligee; Lars Stalfors

Foster the People chronology
III (2017)	Sacred Hearts Club (2017)	In the Darkest of Nights, Let the Birds Sing (2020)

Singles from Sacred Hearts Club
- 1. "Doing It for the Money" Released: April 27, 2017; 2. "Loyal Like Sid & Nancy" Released: June 30, 2017; 3. "Sit Next to Me" Released: July 13, 2017

Sacred Hearts Club is the third studio album by American indie pop band Foster the People, released on July 21, 2017, through Columbia Records. The album was preceded by the extended play III, which is composed of three tracks from the album. Departing from the multi-instrumental, acoustic sound of their previous 2014 album, it draws upon soul, dance, and electronic genres while maintaining their signature indie pop sound. The lyrics address themes of love, politics, fame, and youth, and, similar to their previous albums, are often at thematic odds with the upbeat musical production. This is the band's first studio album to feature long-time touring musicians Isom Innis and Sean Cimino as official members, and their final album to feature drummer Mark Pontius before his departure in October 2021.

The album received mixed reviews upon release, with many critics praising the experimentation while disliking the album's lack of musical consistency. Despite the mixed reception, the album's single "Sit Next to Me" received positive reviews, peaked at number 42 on the Billboard Hot 100 and sold over two million copies across North America. The album has also been certified Gold in the United States.

== Background ==
Foster the People began promoting new music following extensive touring in support of their second studio album, Supermodel (2014), in late 2016. During the recording sessions, Foster described waking up each day and witnessing tragedies, traumatic events and political scandals in the news; citing that the band sought to create an album of joy amidst the chaos of current events. The band performed three brand new songs, entitled "Pay the Man", "Lotus Eater", and "Doing It for the Money", at Rocking the Daisies Music Festival, announcing that they would release their third studio album. On April 5, 2017, the band announced a headlining summer tour in North America in support of the album.

The band released the three-track III (EP) on April 27, 2017. It is composed of three brand new tracks, "Pay the Man", "Doing It for the Money", and "SHC", all of which appear on Sacred Hearts Club. Each song was accompanied with a visual music video uploaded on the band's official Vevo channel. Sacred Hearts Club was formally announced on June 13, 2017, with the premiere of an online short documentary revealing the album's title and release date.

== Singles ==
The album spawned three singles: "Doing It for the Money", released on April 21, 2017; "Loyal Like Sid & Nancy", released as the second single on June 30, 2017; and "Sit Next to Me", released on July 24, 2017, as the third single.

== Sound and influence ==
In the band's online short documentary titled Sacred Hearts Club (the beginning), it was revealed that the album would "feature '60s-inspired sounds and a psychedelic influence". The genres of the songs primarily range from soul, R&B, dance, electronic, to psychedelia. The composition of the album included programmed beats sampled from recordings of Pontius' drumming during live performances in 2013, also incorporating elements from the band's jam sessions. Foster has stated that the album was compiled from two distinct records' worth of material, one with a psychedelic/surf rock focus, and one within the genre of hip-hop.

== Critical reception ==
Professional ratings
Aggregate scores
Source	Rating
AnyDecentMusic?	5.8/10
Metacritic	56/100
Review scores
Source	Rating
AllMusic	4/5 stars
The A.V. Club	C−
Evening Standard	3/5 stars
The Irish Times	3/5 stars
The New Zealand Herald	2.5/5 stars
Newsday	B+
Paste	7.4/10
Pitchfork	5.5/10
Q	2/5 stars
Uncut	6/10

Sacred Hearts Club received mixed to positive reviews from critics, attaining a Metacritic score of 56 based on nine reviews, indicating "mixed or average reviews". The album was praised for its experimentation, while being criticized for a lack of consistency. Critics also noted a failure to recapture the band's old sound, often noting their breakthrough hit "Pumped Up Kicks" in reference. Numerous critics also praised the lyrical content and musical departure from their two previous albums.

== Track listing ==
Sacred Hearts Club track listing
No.	Title	Writer(s)	Producer(s)	Length
1.	"Pay the Man"	Mark Foster; Mark Pontius; Isom Innis; Josh Abraham; Oliver Goldstein; Justin Mohrle; Keinan Abdi Warsame	Foster; Innis; Abraham; Oligee; Lars Stalfors^{[b]}	3:53
2.	"Doing It for the Money"	Foster; Innis; Adam Schmalholz; Ryan Tedder	Foster; Innis; Abraham; Oligee; Stalfors^{[b]}	3:46
3.	"Sit Next to Me"	Foster; Abraham; Lars Stalfors; Johnny Newman; Goldstein	Abraham; Oligee; Stalfors^{[b]}	4:03
4.	"SHC"	Foster; Innis; Pontius	Stalfors	4:08
5.	"I Love My Friends"	Foster; Innis; Abraham; Goldstein	Foster; Innis; Abraham; Oligee; Stalfors^{[b]}	3:45
6.	"Orange Dream"	Innis	Innis	1:20
7.	"Static Space Lover"	Foster; Innis; Jena Malone; Patrik Berger	Foster; Innis^{[a]}; Berger^{[a]}; Stalfors^{[b]}	4:00
8.	"Lotus Eater"	Foster; Innis	Foster; Innis^{[a]}; Abraham^{[a]}; Oligee^{[a]}; Stalfors^{[b]}	3:02
9.	"Time to Get Closer"	Foster; Innis	Foster	0:57
10.	"Loyal Like Sid & Nancy"	Foster; Innis	Innis; Foster^{[a]}	4:40
11.	"Harden the Paint"	Foster; John Hill; KNA; Frans Mernick	Foster; Hill; Mernick^{[b]}; Rob Cohen^{[c]}	3:54
12.	"III"	Foster; Innis	Innis; Foster^{[b]}	4:09
Total length:				41:37

Notes

- ^{^[a]} signifies a co-producer.
- ^{^[b]} signifies an additional producer.
- ^{^[c]} signifies a vocal producer.
- "Orange Dream" contains a sample of "Prelude", as performed by Parliament.

== Personnel ==
Foster the People

- Sean Cimino – guitar (tracks 4, 5, 7, 8)
- Mark Foster – vocals, synthesizer (tracks 1–5, 7–12); engineering (tracks 1–5, 8–10, 12), programming (tracks 1, 4, 10, 12), guitar (tracks 1, 3–5, 7, 9, 11), bass guitar (tracks 1, 3–5, 7–9), piano (tracks 2, 7, 10), tubular bells (tracks 2, 5), bass synth (tracks 2, 4), percussion (track 5), celeste (track 7), Omnichord (tracks 8, 9), electric guitar (track 8)
- Isom Innis – engineering (tracks 1–6, 9, 10, 12), drum programming (tracks 1, 2, 4, 5, 10, 12), programming (tracks 1, 2, 4, 6, 10, 12), drums (tracks 1, 2, 4–10), percussion (tracks 1, 2, 4, 5, 10), synthesizer (tracks 2, 4–7, 10, 12), mixing (tracks 6, 9), bass guitar (track 6); piano, backing vocals (track 12)
- Mark Pontius – drums (tracks 1, 4), percussion (track 7)

Additional musicians

- Ryan Tedder – background vocals (track 2)
- Oliver Goldstein – drum programming, (tracks 3, 5, 8, 10), synthesizer (tracks 3, 5), guitar (tracks 3, 8); piano, bass guitar, programming (track 3)
- Jena Malone – vocals (track 7)
- Stewart Cole – trumpet (track 7)
- Patrik Berger – drum programming (track 7)
- James King – flute (track 7)
- Brian Walsh – clarinet (track 7)
- Gabe Noel – cello (track 10)
- John Hill – drums (track 11)
- Frans Mernick – additional programming (track 11)

Technical

- Greg Calbi – mastering
- Steve Fallone – mastering
- Ali – mixing (tracks 1, 10)
- Manny Marroquin – mixing (track 2)
- Lars Stalfors – mixing (track 3)
- Rich Costey – mixing (tracks 4, 5, 7, 8, 11, 12)
- Dave Cerminara – engineering (tracks 1, 2, 4), additional engineering (tracks 3, 5, 7, 8)
- Cameron Graham – engineering (tracks 1–3, 5, 8)
- Darrell Thorp – engineering (tracks 4, 7)
- Rob Cohen – engineering (track 11)
- Mike Schuppan – engineering (track 6)
- Cyrus "Nois" Taghipour – mix engineering (tracks 1, 10)
- Tyler Page – mix engineering (tracks 1, 10)
- Martin Cooke – mix engineering (tracks 4, 5, 7, 8, 11, 12)
- Nicolas Fournier – mix engineering (tracks 4, 5, 7, 8, 11, 12)

== Charts ==
Chart performance for Sacred Hearts Club
Chart (2017)	Peak position
Australian Albums (ARIA)	71
Canadian Albums (Billboard)	54
Dutch Albums (Album Top 100)	85
French Albums (SNEP)	180
New Zealand Heatseeker Albums (RMNZ)	10
Spanish Albums (Promusicae)	84
UK Album Downloads (Official Charts)	95
US Billboard 200	47
US Top Alternative Albums (Billboard)	8

== Certifications ==
Certifications for Sacred Hearts Club
Region	Certification	Certified units/sales
United States (RIAA)	Gold	500,000^{‡}
^{‡} Sales+streaming figures based on certification alone.
