= Bang Bang Bang (Selena Gomez & the Scene song) =

Promotional single by Selena Gomez & the Scene

from the album When the Sun Goes Down
- Released: June 7, 2011
- Recorded: 2011
- Studio: Strawberrybee Studios (Los Angeles, CA)
- Genre: Electro-disco; Electropop; Teen pop
- Length: 3:15
- Label: Hollywood
- Songwriters: Toby Gad; Meleni Smith; Priscilla Hamilton
- Producer: Toby Gad

"Bang Bang Bang" is a song performed by American band Selena Gomez & the Scene, from their third studio album, When the Sun Goes Down (2011). It was written by Meleni Smith and Priscilla Hamilton, and the song's producer, Toby Gad. The song was released exclusively to the iTunes Store on June 7, 2011, as the album's first promotional single. Selena Gomez stated that the song is the most personal on the album. The song features lyrics directed towards a former boyfriend, as the protagonist declares that her new lover is much better. Musically, the song has a retro production style and is influenced by 1980s music, while deriving of the electro-disco genre. Critics gave the song positive reviews, with several complimenting its sassy attitude and retro feel. The song charted in the lower regions of the Billboard Hot 100 and Canadian Hot 100, at number 96 and 94, respectively.

== Background ==
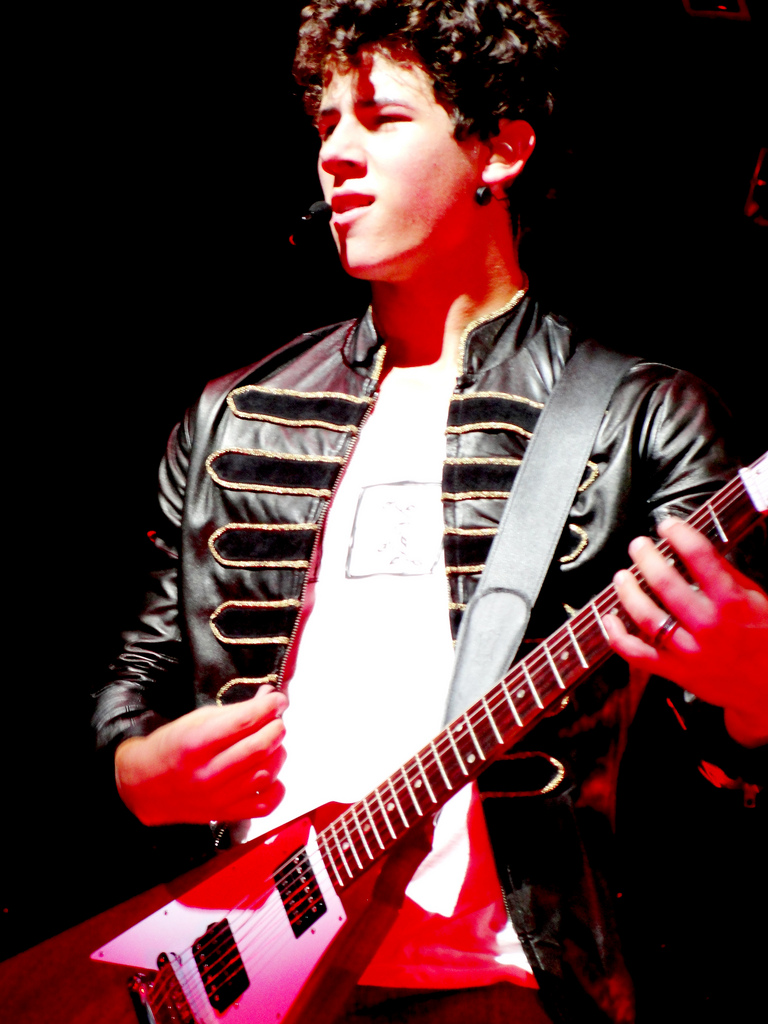
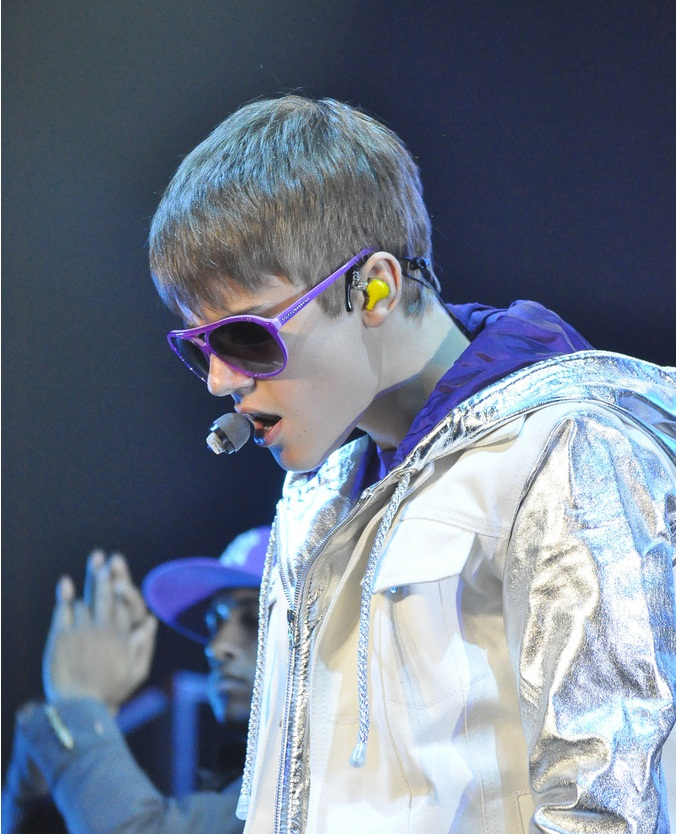
There was speculation that the song was influenced by Gomez's former relationship with pop singer Nick Jonas (left), and her then-boyfriend Justin Bieber (right)

The song was written by Meleni Smith, Priscilla Renea, and the producer of the track, Toby Gad. In an interview with Fashion, Gomez called the "snarky" song the most personal track on the album. The song is aimed towards an ex-boyfriend and Gomez tells him that her new boyfriend is better than he was. The media circulated rumors that the song was based upon Gomez' old relationship with Nick Jonas of the Jonas Brothers and her then-boyfriend, Canadian pop singer Justin Bieber. In an interview with Billboard, when giving a track-by-track preview of the album, Gomez said, "It's a really fun, cheeky song. It's kind of an insult/compliment song about someone that used to be in your life and now someone who is in your life who's amazing. It's a sweet song and I feel like a lot of girls can related to it especially." Gomez stated she rewrote some of the lyrics to fit her perspective.

== Composition ==
"Bang Bang Bang"
A sample of "Bang Bang Bang," showing its retro and 1980s-influenced production style, as well as its "snarky" lyrics.

"Bang Bang Bang" is an electro-disco song reminiscent of La Roux's "Bulletproof". The song also exudes influences of 1980s synthpop, as well as new wave. The song marks a mature sound for the band, as Gomez uses "sultry" vocal inflections and more adult lyrics. Jenna Hally Rubenstein of MTV Buzzworthy said that "The Toby Gad-produced jam has got a cool '80s vibe, while still capturing that same young and fresh sound Selena is known for." Gomez opens the song with a "menial giggle"'; she then delivers the song's lyrics in a tone that is in a confident, coy manner.

== Reception ==
Tim Sendra of Allmusic noted the song as a highlight of the album and said that Gomez "bubbles" her way through the "dancefloor-friendly" track. John Bergstrom of PopMatters called the song a "fun piece of sass." Although Cristin Maher of PopCrush wrote that "for a girl with a four-piece band backing her up, the music seems a bit underwhelming," she said that the song was a "fun, sassy track that will surely please all of the teen pop fans out there." Blair Kelly of musicOMH was less enthusiastic of the song; she deemed it "forgettable" and stated that it and "Love You Like a Love Song" were both "wannabe electro-pop songs which lack both lyrical merit and a really catchy hook to make up for it". Following its release as a promotional single, "Bang Bang Bang" debuted on the Billboard Hot 100 and the Canadian Hot 100 at positions ninety-six and ninety-seven respectively, and it dropped from both charts the following week.

== Credits and personnel ==
- Lead vocals – Selena Gomez
- Songwriting – Toby Gad, Priscilla Renea Hamilton, Meleni Smith
- Production, mixing, programming, all instruments – Toby Gad
- Background vocals – Priscilla Renea, Meleni Smith

== Charts ==
Chart (2011)	Peak position
Canada (Canadian Hot 100)	96
South Korea (Gaon Music Chart)	26
US Billboard Hot 100	94
