= Doing It for the Money =

Single by Foster the People

from the album Sacred Hearts Club
- Released: April 27, 2017
- Recorded: 2016
- Genre: Indie pop; neo-psychedelia
- Length: 3:48
- Label: Columbia
- Songwriters: Mark Foster; Ryan Tedder; Adam Schmalholz; Isom Innis
- Producers: Mark Foster; Isom Innis

Foster the People singles chronology
"Are You What You Want to Be?" (2014)	"Doing It for the Money" (2017)	"Loyal Like Sid & Nancy" (2017)

Music video
- "Doing It for the Money" on YouTube

"Doing It for the Money" is a song by American indie pop band Foster the People. Initially released on April 27, 2017, on their YouTube channel as a part of their new EP (III), the song is featured as the second track on the band's third studio album, Sacred Hearts Club, and was released as the record's first single by Columbia Records.

== Music video ==
The official video for "Doing It for the Money" was released August 11, 2017, and was directed by Daniel Henry and produced by Molly Ortiz. The video utilizes Google's DeepDream Technology that "manipulates reality to create a sensory overload." On the topic of the video, Henry stated that "In researching more about the DeepDream world, I loved the idea of letting the collective unconscious of the internet play a part in the forming the music video. At any moment you can freeze frame and start to see a cryptic narrative that unfolds in infinite degrees. You might see a dog, or a dinosaur, or a dead president in these hallucinations, or it could just be projections of our inner turmoil."

== Personnel ==
Foster the People

- Mark Foster – vocals, piano, bass synthesizer, tubular bells
- Isom Innis – drums, percussion, synthesizers

Additional personnel

- Manny Marroquin – mixing
- Ryan Tedder – backing vocals

== Charts ==
=== Weekly charts ===
Chart (2017–2018)	Peak position
US Hot Rock & Alternative Songs (Billboard)	37
US Rock & Alternative Airplay (Billboard)	23

=== Year-end charts ===
Chart (2017)	Position
US Alternative Songs (Billboard)	48
