= When the Sun Goes Down (Selena Gomez & the Scene album) =

2011 studio album by Selena Gomez & the Scene

Studio album by Selena Gomez & the Scene
- Released: June 21, 2011
- Recorded: November 19, 2010 – March 27, 2011
- Studio: Cryptic Studios (Venice, CA); Dreamlab Studios (Los Angeles, CA); Westlake Recording Studios (Los Angeles, CA); Quad Studios (New York City, NY); Rock Mafia Studios (Santa Monica, CA); Strawberry Bee Studios (Hollywood Hills, CA); The Jungle Room (Glendale, CA); Watersound Productions (Studio City, CA)
- Genre: Dance-pop; electropop
- Length: 40:01
- Label: Hollywood
- Producer: Rock Mafia; Devrim Karaoglu; Toby Gad; Emanuel Kiriakou; Dreamlab; Greg Kurstin; Stefan Abingdon; Josh Alexander; Billy Steinberg; Thomas Armato Sturges; Sandy Vee; Espionage

Selena Gomez & the Scene chronology
The Club Remixes (2011)	When the Sun Goes Down (2011)

Singles from When the Sun Goes Down
- 1. "Who Says" Released: March 14, 2011; 2. "Love You like a Love Song" Released: June 17, 2011; 3. "Hit the Lights" Released: January 20, 2012

When the Sun Goes Down is the third and final studio album by American band Selena Gomez & the Scene, released on June 21, 2011, by Hollywood Records. The band worked with several artists on this album, including writers and producers from their debut, Kiss & Tell (2009), and their second album, A Year Without Rain (2010), such as Rock Mafia's Tim James and Antonina Armato, as well as Katy Perry, Devrim "DK" Karaoglu, and Toby Gad. New contributors to this album included Britney Spears, Priscilla Renea, Emanuel Kiriakou, Dreamlab and Sandy Vee.

When the Sun Goes Down spawned three singles. The lead single from the album, "Who Says" was released in March 2011, peaking at number 21 in the United States and in the top twenty in Canada and New Zealand. The acoustic pop song also went Platinum in the United States. The second single from the album is "Love You like a Love Song" charted in the top forty in Belgium, Canada, New Zealand and the United States. The third and final single, "Hit the Lights" was released on January 20, 2012. The album debuted at number four on the Billboard 200 with sales 78,000 copies, surpassing the first week sales of the group's first two albums. The album rose to number three in its second week. As of January 2020, the album sold over 710,000 copies in the United States. This is the final album released by the group before their indefinite hiatus.

== Background ==
In 2009, the band released their debut album, Kiss & Tell, and quickly followed-up with 2010's A Year Without Rain. After the release of the latter Gomez said that she was not in a rush to release another album, but after hearing "Who Says", she decided to begin another release, calling the song "amazing" and crediting it for inspiring her. "Who Says" debuted on radio show On Air with Ryan Seacrest as the first single of the album. On March 18, 2011, in an interview with MTV News, Gomez revealed, "the third record is really fun, and there's a song called 'Hit the Lights' that I love, and it's basically about every missed opportunity that you've had," she said. "But it's also a dance track. There's a lot more depth [on this album]". Gomez also revealed British singer Pixie Lott and German producer Toby Gad had both penned tracks for the album, while confirming its release for later that year. A few days later, the singer revealed her team and the band "haven't decided [a] title [yet for the album] and we're dealing with the album artwork, 'cause it is very different and I'm growing up. It's a lot more mature". MTV News later confirmed that American singer Britney Spears had also written a song for the album titled "Whiplash". On June 1, 2011, the album's name, When the Sun Goes Down, and track listing were revealed through Gomez's official website. After several songs from When the Sun Goes Down started to leak online, Gomez posted several video messages on her YouTube official channel featuring commentaries about each song of the album. When the Sun Goes Down was released on June 28, 2011 by Hollywood Records.

== Composition ==
Musically, When the Sun Goes Down expands on the dance-pop and electropop themes of its predecessor "A Year Without Rain", with a lighter and sassier feel, according to Tim Sendra of AllMusic also incorporating electro-disco music. Tracks like "Hit the Lights" have disco influences, as they pair ballad lyrics with uptempo and midtempo dance music. The album also explores organic instrumentation. Both the first single "Who Says" and the fourth track "We Own the Night" featuring Pixie Lott features more acoustic, indie pop sounds, which was originally intended for Kelly Clarkson's fifth album Stronger. They are the only songs on the album devoid of synthesized instrumentation.

The first track, "Love You Like a Love Song", was written by Antonina Armato, Tim James, Adam Schmalholz and was produced by Rock Mafia and Devrim Karaoglu. Also serving as the album's second single, the song contains deep, whispered vocals and incorporates a eurodisco rhythm and a soft dubstep influence. Gomez described the promotional single "Bang Bang Bang" as fun and cheeky. It is made up of 1980s electro-disco synths and sees Gomez praising her new boyfriend while mocking her ex. The track was also compared to British electropop duo La Roux's 2009 hit "Bulletproof". "Who Says" is an acoustic self-empowerment anthem where the singer extends kindness and sympathy to her critics. Serving as the album's first single, it debuted on the Hot 100 at number twenty-four and peaked at number twenty-one, standing as the group's highest charting single in the U.S., Canada and New Zealand. "We Own the Night" was written by Toby Gad and British electronic soul singer-songwriter Pixie Lott, who is also featured on backing vocals. The track has a largely acoustic, harmonic sound paired with escapist lyrics in the style of Jimmy Buffett. "Hit the Lights" written by Leah Haywood, Daniel James, Tony Nilsson and produced by Dreamlab is a dance song about overcoming anxiety and living in the moment. American pop singer Britney Spears composed the album's sixth track titled "Whiplash". It is an electropop song described as electro glam that is about an intense romance, featuring transportation imagery. The song has gained notability for Britney Spears' involvement in the composition, Gomez' faux-English accent in the spoken word verse before the chorus, and for being one of the band's more mature songs.

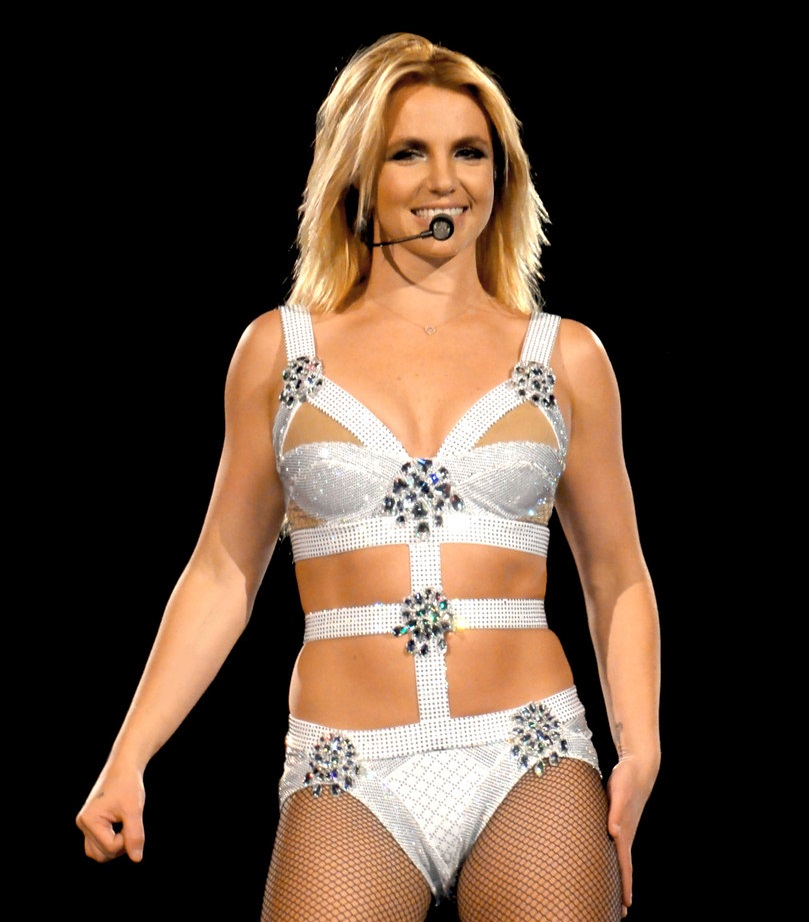
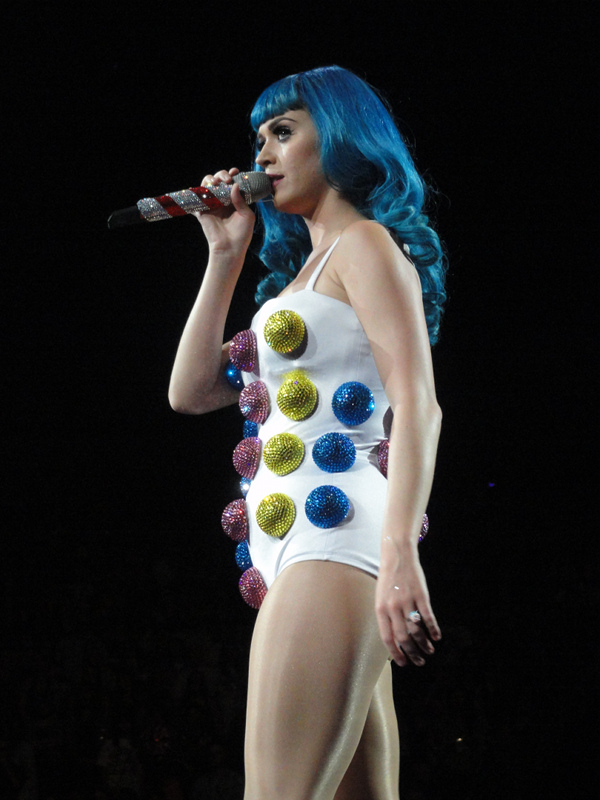
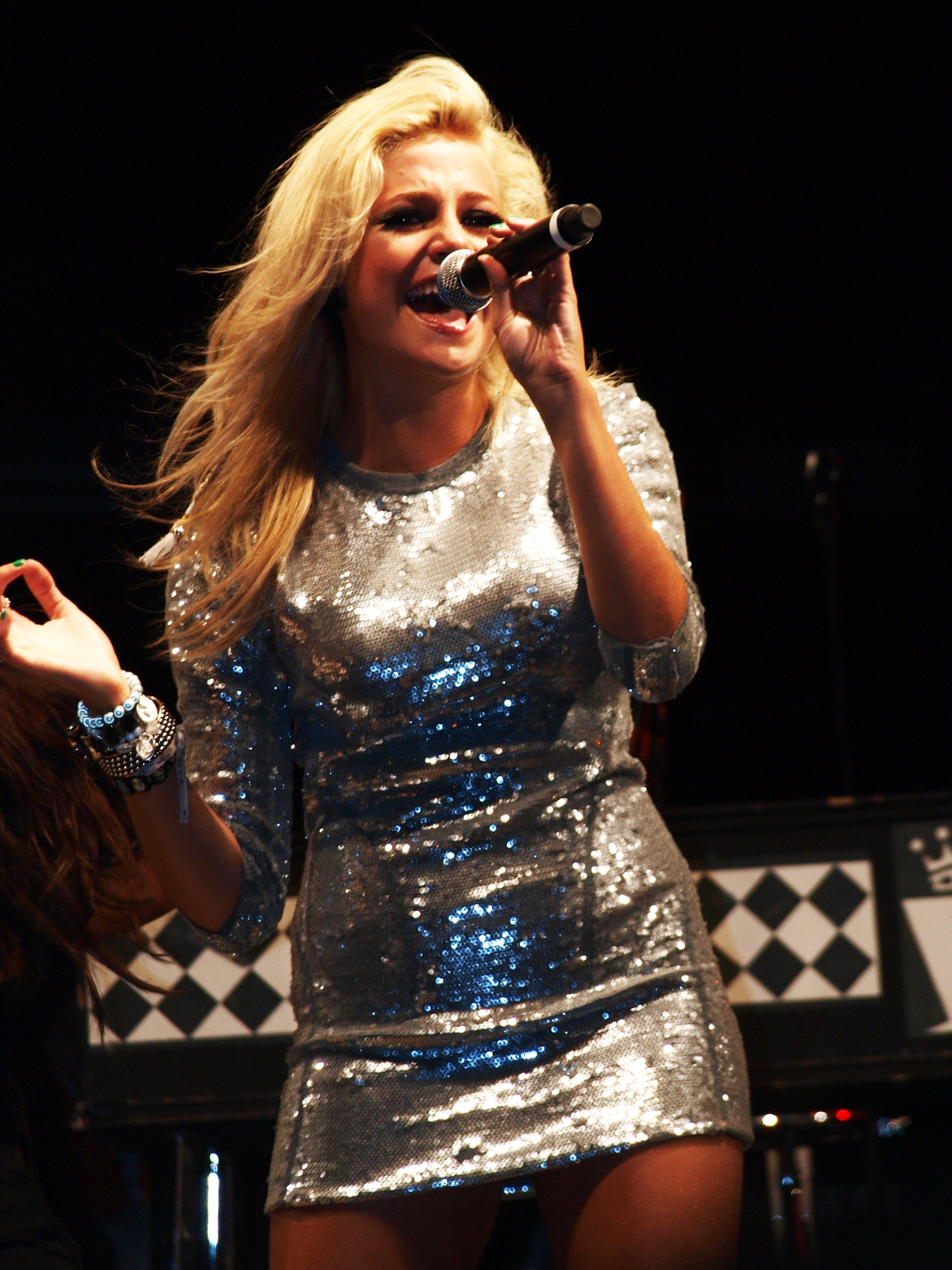
When the Sun Goes Down features contributions from a variety of artists including Britney Spears (left), Katy Perry (center) and Pixie Lott (right).

The title track features the use of electric guitars and stuttering synthesizers. Selena Gomez stated that "When the Sun Goes Down" held a special meaning for her and her bass player, Joey Clement, because of their collaborative involvement in the track's composition. Gomez commented "I got to rewrite the bridge of it as well. It felt like we got to do that as a band." The eighth track on the album is "My Dilemma", a Kelly Clarkson-esque pop rock song about conflicted feelings towards a potential breakup. "That's More Like It", the following track, is penned by Katy Perry and was inspired by American women of the 1950s and their relegation to domesticity. In the song, Gomez demands that her negligent man does the cooking, cleaning, and housework, commanding him "Make me dinner and bring it to me." "Outlaw" is a bleak cautionary tale and revenge ballad lyrically similar to Carrie Underwood's "Cowboy Casanova" and Lady Gaga's "Monster". The lyrics also make use of Wild West imagery and references to Gomez's home state of Texas, "I'm from the Lone Star state, I'm ready to bring you in." The album's final song "Middle of Nowhere" is a dance-pop ballad that features electropop beats and synthesizers along with bells and chimes. In the song, Gomez laments being left behind by a manipulative ex lover, for whom she made drastic personal changes. The song's bridge is a deep and heavily-breathed spoken-word recitation of the song's chorus, much in the style of Garbage frontwoman Shirley Manson. A Spanish-language version of the lead single "Who Says" titled "Dices" is featured as a bonus track.

== Singles ==
The album's lead single, "Who Says", was co-written and produced by Emanuel Kiriakou, Priscilla Hamilton, and was released on March 14, 2011. The song has been met with generally positive reviews from most music critics, with many praising its theme of self-empowerment and Bill Lamb of About.com even called the band "the most consistent Disney pop hitmaker in recent years." The song was commercially successful, peaking at number 21 on the Billboard Hot 100 and selling over three million copies in the United States, and was certified triple platinum by RIAA. "Who Says" also reached number 17 in Canada and 15 in New Zealand, becoming the band's highest charting single on those countries. The song also managed to peak inside the top fifty in Germany and Ireland and appeared on the main charts in the United Kingdom, Belgium, Australia, Austria, Thailand and Vietnam. On June 17, 2011, "Love You Like a Love Song", the album's official second single was released. Gomez started filming the music video for "Hit the Lights" in September 2011. The video was released in November 2011, the song has currently attained the top thirty chart position in Belgium and debuted on the Canadian Hot 100 at number ninety-three. A remixes EP was released for "Hit the Lights" on January 20, 2012 and it was officially released as the third and final international single on January 20, 2012.

=== Promotional singles ===
In preparation for the album's release, the band's record label decided to release two buzz singles. On June 7, 2011, iTunes released two promotional tracks from the album. Beginning with "Bang Bang Bang", which peaked ninety-four in the Billboard Hot 100, and followed by a Spanish version of "Who Says", titled "Dices".

== Critical reception ==
Professional ratings
Aggregate scores
Source	Rating
Metacritic	58/100
Review scores
Source	Rating
Allmusic	4/5 stars
Club Fonograma	(64/100)
Entertainment Weekly	B+
Rolling Stone	2/5 stars
The Guardian	2/5 stars

When The Sun Goes Down generally received mixed reviews from the music critics. At Metacritic, which assigns a normalised rating out of 100 to reviews from mainstream critics, the album has an average score of 58 out of 100, which indicates "mixed or average reviews" based on six reviews.

Mikael Wood from Entertainment Weekly wrote that "[Gomez] sounds fully invested in tart electro-disco ditties like 'Bang Bang Bang'," and that "top-shelf collaborators don't hurt." Tim Sendra, writing for AllMusic, called the album "an improvement over 2010's A Year Without Rain and "fun" but felt that "she seems to be acting out the songs, more than actually feeling the emotions she's singing about" and that "if she wants to make a real impact, she'll need to dig a little deeper or stake out her own territory."

Jody Rosen from Rolling Stone had a more negative review, writing that "she brings nothing in the way of personality to her songs" and that "Gomez may be the most boring teen-pop star of her generation. She makes Ashley Tisdale seem like Lady Gaga." John Bergstrom of PopMatters opined that the album "smacks of cold calculation" and that "it could have been conceived, designed, written and produced by a computer program, the only human input being those of Gomez's vocals" while adding that "here you have 27 songwriters and eight production teams contributing to a total of 11 songs. Is this an album or "Iron Man 3?" Kitty Empire of The Guardian wrote that "throughout this dance-pop album there's a catch in her throat that suggests an embryonic personality."

=== Accolades ===
Year	Award	Category	Work	Result
2011	Teen Choice Awards	Choice Music: Single	"Who Says"	Won
2011	Teen Choice Awards	Choice Music: Love Song	"Love You Like a Love Song"	Won
2012	2012 MuchMusic Video Awards	Most Streamed Video of the Year	"Love You Like a Love Song"	Nominated
2012	2012 Teen Choice Awards	Choice Music: Single by a Group	"Love You Like a Love Song"	Won
2012	2012 MTV Video Music Awards	Best Female Video	"Love You Like a Love Song"	Nominated

== Commercial performance ==
When the Sun Goes Down was released on June 28, 2011. In the week of July 4, 2011, it debuted at number four on the Billboard 200 with the band's highest sales week to date, selling 78,000 copies in its first week. The next week the album rose to number three, selling 44,000 copies, making it the band's highest charting album. In Canada, the album sold 9,000 copies in its first week, debuting at number two on the Canadian Albums Chart. The album debuted in Spain at number two on the Spanish Albums Chart. The album peaked there for three weeks, during the debut week and the fifth and sixth week on the chart. In Belgium, the album debuted at number twenty-one on the Belgian Albums Chart and jumped to its peak position at number six. The album debuted and peaked at number six in Mexico. The album debuted at number sixteen in Norway and rose to its peak position at number 6 in its eighth week. The album has sold over 710,000 copies in the United States.

== Track listing ==
Credits adapted from the album's liner notes

When the Sun Goes Down track listing
No.	Title	Writer(s)	Producer(s)	Length
1.	"Love You like a Love Song"	Antonina Armato; Tim James; Adam Schmalholz	Rock Mafia; Devrim Karaoglu^{[a]}	3:08
2.	"Bang Bang Bang"	Toby Gad; Meleni Smith; Priscilla Hamilton	Gad	3:15
3.	"Who Says"	Emanuel Kiriakou; Hamilton	Kiriakou	3:16
4.	"We Own the Night" (featuring Pixie Lott)	Gad; Pixie Lott	Gad	3:47
5.	"Hit the Lights"	Leah Haywood; Daniel James; Tony Nilsson	Dreamlab	3:14
6.	"Whiplash"	Greg Kurstin; Nicole Morier; Britney Spears	Kurstin	3:40
7.	"When the Sun Goes Down"	Selena Gomez; Joey Clement; Steve Sulikowski; Stefan Abingdon	Abingdon	3:16
8.	"My Dilemma"	Armato; James; Karaoglu	Rock Mafia; Karaoglu^{[a]}	3:10
9.	"That's More Like It"	Josh Alexander; Billy Steinberg; Katy Perry	Alexander; Steinberg	3:09
10.	"Outlaw"	Gomez; Armato; James; Thomas Armato Sturges	Rock Mafia; Karaoglu^{[a]}; Sturges^{[a]}	3:22
11.	"Middle of Nowhere"	Espen Lind; Amund Bjorklund; Sandy Wilhelm; Carmen Michelle Key	Espionage; Sandy Vee^{[b]}; Carmen Michelle^{[c]}	3:27
12.	"Dices" (Spanish version of "Who Says")	Kiriakou; Hamilton; Edgar Cortazar^{[d]}; Mark Portmann^{[d]}	Kiriakou; Portmann^{[c]}; Cortazar^{[c]}	3:16
Total length:				40:01

Notes

- ^{^[a]} signifies co-producer
- ^{^[b]} signifies a producer and vocal producer
- ^{^[c]} signifies a vocal producer
- ^{^[d]} signifies a language adapter
- Digital deluxe edition includes eight remix bonus tracks of "Love You like a Love Song".
- United Kingdom iTunes Store edition includes the bonus behind the scenes video of "Love You like a Love Song".
- Canadian iTunes Store standard edition includes the track "Who Says" (SmashMode Radio Remix) as track 12 instead of "Dices" (Spanish version of "Who Says").
- Target and ASDA edition includes the bonus remix tracks "Fantasma de Amor" ("Ghost of You" – Spanish version), "A Year Without Rain" (Dave Audé Radio Remix), "Who Says" (Bimbo Jones Radio Remix), and "Who Says" (Dave Audé Radio Remix).
- Japanese edition includes the bonus remix tracks "Who Says" (Dave Audé Radio Remix), "Round & Round" (7th Heaven Radio Mix), and "A Year Without Rain" (Fascination Club Radio Edit).
- Japanese edition also includes a bonus DVD which features the music videos and behind the scenes of "Who Says" and "Love You like a Love Song" .

== Personnel ==
Credits adapted from the album's liner notes

- Selena Gomez – lead vocals (all tracks), background vocals (track 4)
- Rock Mafia – production, mixing & additional background vocals (tracks 1, 8, 10)
- Toby Gad – production, mixing, programming & instruments (tracks 2, 4)
- Greg Kurstin – production, mixing, engineering, keyboards, bass, guitar & programming (track 6)
- Nigel Lundemo – digital editing (tracks 1, 8, 10), additional vocal editing (track 12)
- Josh Alexander – production, programming, recording & instruments (track 9)
- Sandy Vee – production, vocal production, mixing & keyboards (track 11)
- Mark Portmann – language adaptation, recording, vocal production & additional vocal editing (track 12)
- Paul Palmer – mixing (tracks 1, 8, 10)
- Adam Comstock – engineering (tracks 1, 8, 10)
- Steve Hammons – engineering (tracks 1, 8, 10)
- Devrim Karaoglu – co-production (tracks 1, 8, 10)
- Tim Pierce – guitar (tracks 1, 8, 10)
- Tim James – digital editing (tracks 1, 8, 10)
- Brooke Adams – additional background vocals (tracks 1, 8, 10)
- Emanuel Kiriakou – production (tracks 3, 12), instruments (track 3)
- Serban Ghenea – mixing (tracks 3, 5, 12)
- John Hanes – mix engineering (tracks 3, 5, 12)
- Espen Lind – recording, guitar & keyboards (track 11)
- Tim Roberts – mix engineering assistance (tracks 3, 12)
- Pixie Lott – lead vocals & background vocals (track 4)
- Stefan Abingdon – production & mixing (track 7)
- Brian Reeves – mixing & recording (track 7)
- Jon Vella – additional programming (track 8, 10)
- Noel Zancanella – programming & instruments (track 9)
- Carmen Michelle – vocal production & backing vocals (track 11)
- Edgar Cortazar – language adaptation & vocal production (track 12)
- Ross Hogarth – engineering (track 1)
- Priscilla Renea – backing vocals (track 2)
- Meleni Smith – backing vocals (track 2)
- Andrew Goldstein – additional synthesizer (track 3)
- Dreamlab – production (track 5)
- Phil Seaford – engineering assistance (track 5)
- Jesse Shatkin – engineering (track 6)
- Nicole Morier – backing vocals (track 6)
- Lindsey Harper – backing vocals (track 7)
- Jimmy Messer – guitar (track 8)
- Billy Steinberg – production (track 9)
- Phil Tan – mixing (track 9)
- Chris Garcia – digital editing (track 9)
- Scott Roewe – logic and pro tools teching (track 9)
- Damien Lewis – additional engineering assistance (track 9)
- Thomas Sturges – co-production (track 10)
- Espionage – production (track 11)
- Francis Murray – recording (track 11)
- Howard Willing – recording (track 11)
- Carlos Castro – recording (track 12)
- Leyla Hoyle – background vocals (track 12)

Credits

- Robert Vosgien – mastering
- Jon Lind – A&R
- Cindy Warden – A&R coordination
- Lincoln Wheeler – marketing
- Mandy Teefey – management
- David Lande – legal
- David Snow – creative director
- Jeri Heiden – art direction
- Nick Steinhardt – art direction & design
- Kate Turning – photography
- Steve Jacobi – photo producer

== Charts ==
=== Charts ===
Chart (2011)	Peak position
Australian Albums (ARIA)	14
Austrian Albums (Ö3 Austria)	11
Belgian Albums (Ultratop Flanders)	6
Belgian Albums (Ultratop Wallonia)	26
Canadian Albums (Billboard)	2
Czech Albums Chart	19
Danish Albums (Hitlisten)	22
French Albums (SNEP)	47
German Albums Chart	18
Greek Albums Chart	39
Irish Albums Chart	13
Italian Albums (FIMI)	10
Japanese Albums Chart	40
Mexican Albums Chart	6
New Zealand Albums (RMNZ)	8
Norwegian Albums (VG-lista)	6
Polish Albums Chart	11
Spanish Albums (Promusicae)	2
Swiss Albums (Schweizer Hitparade)	27
UK Albums (OCC)	15
US Billboard 200	3

=== Year-end charts ===
Chart (2011)	Position
Belgian Albums (Ultratop Flanders)	62
Canadian Albums (Billboard)	23
Spanish Albums (PROMUSICAE)	39
US Billboard 200	76
Chart (2012)	Position
Mexican Albums Chart	93
US Billboard 200	121

== Certifications ==
Certifications and sales for When the Sun Goes Down
Region	Certification	Certified units/sales
Argentina (CAPIF)	Platinum	40,000^{^}
Brazil (Pro-Música Brasil)	Gold	20,000^{*}
Canada (Music Canada)	Platinum	80,000^{^}
Chile	Platinum	10,000
Denmark (IFPI Danmark)	Gold	10,000^{‡}
Ecuador	Platinum	6,000
Honduras	Platinum	5,000
Indonesia	Gold	10,000
Mexico (AMPROFON)	Gold	30,000^{^}
Poland (ZPAV)	Gold	10,000^{*}
Singapore (RIAS)	Gold	5,000^{*}
Spain (Promusicae)	Gold	30,000^{^}
United Kingdom (BPI)	Silver	60,000^{‡}
United States (RIAA)	Platinum	1,000,000^{^}
Venezuela	Platinum	10,000
^{*} Sales figures based on certification alone.^{^} Shipments figures based on certification alone.^{‡} Sales+streaming figures based on certification alone.

== Release history ==
Region	Date	Label
Australia	June 21, 2011	Hollywood Records, Festival Mushroom Records, Warner Music Australia
Belgium	June 21, 2011	Universal Music
China	June 21, 2011	Universal Music
Austria	June 24, 2011	Universal Music
Czech Republic	June 24, 2011	Universal Music
Germany	June 24, 2011	Universal Music
Ireland	June 27, 2011	Hollywood Records
New Zealand	June 28, 2011	Hollywood Records
United States	June 28, 2011	Hollywood Records
Spain	June 28, 2011	Universal Music
Canada	June 28, 2011	Hollywood Records
France	July 4, 2011	Fascination Records
United Kingdom	July 4, 2011	Fascination Records
Netherlands	July 12, 2011	Universal Music
Japan	September 14, 2011	Avex Group
