= Michael Pound =

Computer scientist

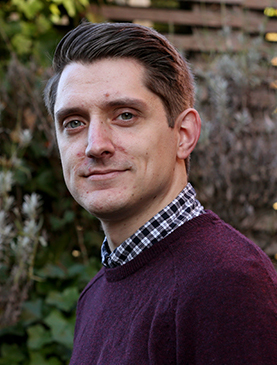
- Pound in 2018
- Other name: Mike Pound
- Occupations: Lecturer, Researcher, Media Personality
- Years active: Present

Academic work
- Discipline: Computer Science
- Sub-discipline: Bioimage analysis, computer vision, image recognition, computer security
- Institutions: University of Nottingham

Michael P. Pound is a researcher at the University of Nottingham. He is known for his work in the areas of bioimage analysis, computer vision, image recognition, computer security, and for his appearances on the video series Computerphile.

== Career ==
Pound's work focuses on the use of machine learning, deep learning, and bioimage analysis for the purpose of plant phenotyping. His work on the identification of root and leaf tips through image-based phenotyping has been recognized as important in the field of bioimage analysis.

The image analysis tool RootNav was developed by a research team led by Pound. The tool uses image analysis to identify complex root system architectures. It has been made available to the scientific community and has been used by other researchers in the field to facilitate batch processing of high numbers of images in various studies of plant phenotyping.

== Media appearances ==
Pound has made numerous appearances on Brady Haran's video series Computerphile. During these appearances, Pound has discussed aspects of his work including password cracking, brute forcing, kernel convolution and image analysis.
