= Who Says (Selena Gomez & the Scene song) =

2011 single by Selena Gomez & the Scene

- Artwork for English version

Single by Selena Gomez & the Scene

from the album When the Sun Goes Down
- B-side: "Ghost of You"
- Released: March 14, 2011
- Recorded: November 2010
- Studio: Echo Studios (Los Angeles, CA); The Jungle Room (Glendale, CA); Westlake Recording Studios (Los Angeles, CA); Dreamlab Studios (Los Angeles, CA)
- Genre: Pop
- Length: 3:15
- Label: Hollywood
- Songwriters: Emanuel Kiriakou; Priscilla Hamilton
- Producer: Emanuel Kiriakou

Selena Gomez & the Scene singles chronology
| "A Year Without Rain" (2010) | "Who Says" (2011) | "Love You like a Love Song" (2011) |

Music video
- "Who Says" on YouTube

"Who Says" is a song performed by American band Selena Gomez & the Scene. Priscilla Renea wrote the song with Emanuel Kiriakou, who produced the track. The song was released in March 2011, as the lead single from the band's third album, When the Sun Goes Down (2011). According to Gomez, the song was intended to inspire people, and fire back at the "haters", particularly those involved in cyberbullying. "Who Says" marks a distinct departure in sound for the band, as it has an acoustic and organic feel, compared to their dance-pop and club-oriented previous singles.

"Who Says" received generally positive reviews from critics, who appreciated its message and the change of pace for the band. The song charted in the top thirty in the United States, Canada and New Zealand, and it became their highest charting single on these charts at the time. It also reached the lower regions of European charts. "Who Says" was certified Platinum by the Recording Industry Association of America. It also became the act's third No. 1 Billboard Hot Dance Club Songs. The song's accompanying music video features Gomez frolicking around a city, removing makeup, and performing with the band on a beach. Gomez performed the song on a variety occasions including at the 2011 MuchMusic Video Awards, on Dancing with the Stars, and So Random!.

== Background and inspiration ==
In 2009, the band released their debut album Kiss & Tell and quickly followed-up with 2010's A Year Without Rain. After the release of the latter, Gomez said that she was not in a rush to release another album, but after hearing "Who Says", she decided to begin another release, calling the song "amazing" and crediting it for inspiring her. Gomez would later call the song "fun and empowering", commenting, "Every time I sing this song, I'm like, 'I feel better already!'" When talking about the song's message, Gomez commented that she thought of it as "sweet", going on to say, "with bullying, with cyberbullying, with all the negativity that is in high school and dealing with things, you're already trying to figure out who you are; it doesn't help when people are constantly trying to tear you down." She then said that she was "dealing with it, of course" and was "going through it as well". After debuting the single on On Air with Ryan Seacrest, Gomez mentioned the criticism received on Twitter and Facebook due to being a celebrity.

Twitter and Facebook are really negative for me … within that world is such easy access to people's feelings. You can get a thousand wonderful comments but just one will throw you off and that's how it is with me. Basically it's to the haters—the people trying to bring you down.

— Selena Gomez

The single follows in succession of other self-empowerment singles such as "We R Who We R" by Kesha, "Firework" by Katy Perry, "Fuckin' Perfect" by Pink, and "Born This Way" by Lady Gaga. Gomez herself stated "I am so happy [about recent empowerment songs], 'cause music is a universal language, and it's a quick way to get to everybody. The fact that all these artists are doing that, it's really good. I'm really happy." The song was released on iTunes in the United States and Canada on March 14, 2011. It was released as a CD single in Germany on March 15, 2011, with the B-side of "Ghost of You" from A Year Without Rain.

== Composition ==
The song is a departure in her previous singles such as "Round & Round" and "Naturally", whereas the previous were dance-pop and club-oriented, "Who Says" has an "organic" and "acoustic" feel. According to the sheet music published at Musicnotes.com by Alfred Publishing, "Who Says" is set in common time in a moderate tempo of 101 beats per minute. It is composed in the key of E major as Gomez's vocal range spans from the low-note of G#_{3} to the high-note of E_{5}. The song contains string accents described as "sympathetic, but not overpowering". Described as a "jangly pop tune", having an "overarching feel-good vibe", lyrically, the song speaks of "embracing who you are and not letting your critics get you down". Gomez sings of insecurities, and people telling her she is not good enough, before asserting "I'm sure you got some things/ You'd like to change about yourself/ But when it comes to me/ I wouldn't want to be anybody else."

According to Brian Voerding of AOL Radio Blog, "Gomez sings about staying true to herself, particularly in the face of doubt that comes from others telling her she can't live up to her dreams". In the song she refers to her criticisms as "the price of beauty". Bill Lamb of About.com said the song's positive message is "all about recognizing yourself as a beautiful person despite what others might say or think".

== Critical reception ==
Jocelyn Vena of MTV News complimented the song, commenting that "Top 40 has a new empowerment anthem". Bill Lamb of About.com said Gomez "has become the most consistent Disney pop hitmaker in recent years" and that "she has not reached these achievements through gimmickry or pandering to an audience. She has succeeded with quality, straightforward pop songs." Lamb went on to say that "Who Says" was no exception, complimenting Gomez's "winning vocals", and the song's "bright, catchy instrumental arrangement" and the "irresistible chorus". However, Lamb commented that the song was lacking in originality, and said that it was another pop song with a theme of self-esteem. Although a writer from The Huffington Post called the song "superfluous" and like many feel-good anthems, "a little bit tepid", the writer said it was "cute" and an "ode to self worth" which "exudes bubblegum confidence in the manner of her man (boy) Bieber's tune 'Never Say Never'".

== Chart performance ==
"Who Says" debuted on the US Billboard Hot 100 at number 24. The charting matched the debut of "Round & Round" the lead single from A Year Without Rain. The song managed to peak at number 21 on the chart dated June 29, marking the band's highest charting effort to date. Additionally, the song has reached number 17 on the US Pop Songs chart and the top position on the US Hot Dance Club Play chart "Who Says" also appeared on the Billboard component charts Adult Pop Songs and Adult Contemporary, the band's first appearance on those charts. It charted at number 37 on the previous and 27 on the latter. The song was certified triple Platinum for sales and streaming by the RIAA on June 11, 2013. It has sold 2.1 million copies in the US as of May 2017.

The song debuted at number 17 on the Canadian Hot 100, becoming their highest charting single on the chart. It also reached number 15 on the New Zealand Singles Chart, becoming their highest charting single on that chart, beating the peak of "Naturally" which reached number twenty. The song charted in the top 50 in Germany and Ireland, and appeared on the main charts in the United Kingdom, Australia, and Austria.

== Music video ==
The music video was directed by Chris Applebaum and filmed in Los Angeles, California on February 12–13, 2011. A thirty-six second teaser of the video was released on March 9, 2011 and the video premiered on Vevo on March 11, 2011. The video starts off with Gomez in a long black dress at a photoshoot where she starts singing the first verse. She then removes her earrings and black high heels and exits the studio. Gomez is seen singing while walking barefoot through a city while carrying her shoes in her hand, riding in a cab and eventually walking on the outskirts of the city as lyrics appear in various locations including a theater marquee, the side of a building, and written in the sky. Eventually she enters a public restroom where she changes into casual clothing, throws away the black dress and removes her make-up. After this, Gomez makes her way to a beach, where she is seen singing with her band, surrounded by fans. The video ends as the crowd runs into the water, and the waves wash away the words 'THE END' written in the sand.

== Live performances ==
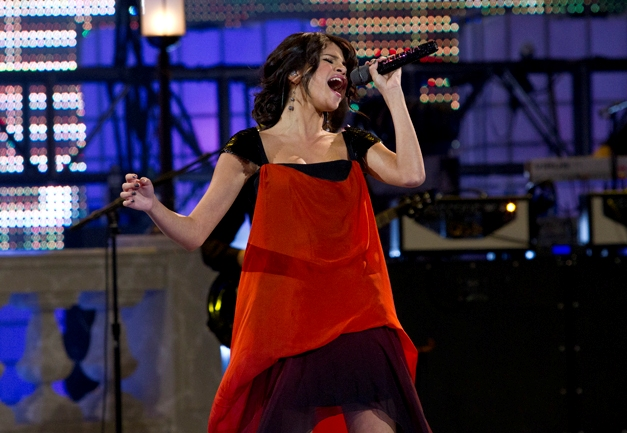
Gomez performing "Who Says" at 2011 Much Music Video Awards (Photo: Tony Felgueiras)

Gomez appeared on both the Late Show with David Letterman on March 16, 2011, and The Seven on March 18, 2011 to promote the single. The band performed the song for the first time at the 3rd annual Concert for Hope on March 20, 2011. They later performed the song on The Ellen DeGeneres Show on March 22, 2011, and on Dancing with the Stars on April 5, 2011. The band also performed the song on an episode of So Random!. The band also performed the song on Good Morning America on June 17, 2011. On June 19, 2011, the band performed the song on the 2011 MuchMusic Video Awards, whereas they performed it on Late Night with Jimmy Fallon and Live with Regis and Kelly on June 24, 2011 and June 29, 2011, respectively. On November 22, 2011, Gomez performed the song herself with Taylor Swift for her Speak Now World Tour in Madison Square Garden, New York City.

== Track listing ==
- CD single
1. "Who Says" – 3:15
2. "Ghost of You" – 3:23
- UK iTunes single / UK promo CD single
1. "Who Says" – 3:15
2. "Who Says" (Instrumental) – 3:15
- AUS remix single
1. "Who Says" (Bimbo Jones Radio Remix) – 2:49
2. "Who Says" (Dave Audé Radio Remix) – 3:33
3. "Who Says" (Tony Moran and Warren Rigg Radio Remix) – 3:38
- UK remix single
1. "Who Says" (Dave Audé Club Mix) – 7:07
2. "Who Says" (Bimbo Jones Club Mix) – 5:46
3. "Who Says" (Tony Moran & Warren Rigg Club Mix) – 7:24
4. "Who Says" (Joe Bermudez-Chico Club Remix) – 6:51
5. "Who Says" (SmashMode Extended Remix) – 5:41

== Awards and nominations ==
| Year | Award | Category | Result |
|---|---|---|---|
| 2011 | Teen Choice Awards | Choice Music: Single | Won |

== Charts ==
=== Weekly charts ===
| Chart (2011) | Peak position |
|---|---|
| Australia (ARIA) | 57 |
| Austria (Ö3 Austria Top 40) | 62 |
| Belgium (Ultratip Bubbling Under Flanders) | 8 |
| Canada Hot 100 (Billboard) | 17 |
| Germany (GfK) | 44 |
| Ireland (IRMA) | 36 |
| Japan Hot 100 (Billboard) | 68 |
| New Zealand (Recorded Music NZ) | 15 |
| Slovakia (IFPI) | 90 |
| UK Singles (OCC) | 51 |
| US Billboard Hot 100 | 21 |
| US Adult Contemporary (Billboard) | 27 |
| US Adult Pop Airplay (Billboard) | 37 |
| US Dance Club Songs (Billboard) | 1 |
| US Pop Airplay (Billboard) | 17 |

=== Year-end charts ===
| Chart (2011) | Position |
|---|---|
| Canada (Canadian Hot 100) | 91 |
| US Billboard Hot 100 | 78 |
| US Hot Dance Club Songs | 27 |

== Certifications ==
| Region | Certification | Certified units/sales |
|---|---|---|
| Australia (ARIA) | Platinum | 70,000^{^} |
| Brazil (Pro-Música Brasil) | 2× Platinum | 120,000^{‡} |
| Denmark (IFPI Danmark) | Gold | 45,000^{‡} |
| New Zealand (RMNZ) | Platinum | 30,000^{‡} |
| Norway (IFPI Norway) | Gold | 5,000^{*} |
| United Kingdom (BPI) | Silver | 200,000^{‡} |
| United States (RIAA) | 4× Platinum | 4,000,000^{‡} |
Streaming
| Norway (IFPI Norway) | Gold | 1,500,000^{†} |
^{*} Sales figures based on certification alone.^{^} Shipments figures based on certification alone.^{‡} Sales+streaming figures based on certification alone.^{†} Streaming-only figures based on certification alone.

== Release history ==
Release dates and formats for "Who Says"
| Region | Date | Format | Label(s) | Ref. |
|---|---|---|---|---|
| United States | March 22, 2011 | Mainstream airplay | Hollywood | |

== See also ==
- List of number-one dance singles of 2011 (U.S.)
