= The Dresden Dolls discography =

- Studio albums: 2
- Extended plays: 1
- Live albums: 1
- Compilation albums: 2
- Singles: 8
- Video albums: 2
- Music videos: 8

The discography of The Dresden Dolls includes studio, live, and compilation albums and DVDs, as well as EPs, singles, and music videos.

== Albums ==
=== Studio albums ===
List of studio albums, with selected information
Title	Album details	Peak chart positions							Sales
Title	Album details	US	US Indie	US Rock	AUS	AUT	FRA	UK	Sales
The Dresden Dolls	Released: September 26, 2003; Label: Roadrunner, 8 ft. Records; Formats: CD, digital download, LP	—	—	—	—	—	—	—	US: 149,000
Yes, Virginia...	Released: April 18, 2006; Label: Roadrunner; Formats: CD, digital download, LP	42	24	9	52	41	138	105	US: 19,000

=== Live albums ===
List of live albums, with selected information
Title	Album details
A Is for Accident	Released: May 27, 2003; Label: Important, 8 ft.; Formats: CD, digital download, LP

=== Compilation albums ===
List of compilation albums, with selected information
Title	Album details	Peak chart positions			
Title	Album details	US	US Alt	AUS	AUT
No, Virginia...	Released: May 17, 2008; Label: Roadrunner; Formats: CD, digital download, LP	94	25	78	70
The Virginia Monologues	Released: April 18, 2015; Label: Rhino; Formats: LP	—	—	—	—

== EPs ==
List of EPs, with selected information
Title	EP details
The Dresden Dolls	Released: November 19, 2001; Label: Self-released; Formats: CD

== Singles ==
Year	Title	Album
2003	"Good Day"	The Dresden Dolls
2003	"Girl Anachronism"	The Dresden Dolls
2004	"Coin-Operated Boy"	The Dresden Dolls
2006	"Sing"	Yes, Virginia...
2006	"Backstabber"	Yes, Virginia...
2007	"Shores of California"	Yes, Virginia...
2008	"Night Reconnaissance"	No, Virginia...
2008	"Dear Jenny"	No, Virginia...
2020	"I'm Going to Go Back There Someday"	Non-album single

=== Certified songs ===
Title	Year	Certifications	Album
"My Alcoholic Friends"	2006	RIAA: Platinum	Yes, Virginia...

== Other appearances ==
- "Pretty in Pink" (The Psychedelic Furs cover) on the album High School Reunion (2005)
- "Life on Mars" (David Bowie cover) on album 2. CONTAMINATION: A Tribute to David Bowie [Failure To Communicate Records] (2005)
- "A Night at the Roses" on album A Users Guide to The First 1 Important Records Releases (2005)
- "Ballad of a Teenage Queen"(Johnny Cash cover) with Franz Nicolay on All Aboard: A Tribute To Johnny Cash (2008)
- "New England" (Jonathan Richman cover) with Franz Nicolay on his EP St. Sebastian of the Short Stage (2009)

== Videography ==
=== DVDs ===
- Live: In Paradise (2005)
- Live at the Roundhouse (2007)

=== Music videos ===
Year	Video	Album	Director
2003	"Girl Anachronism"	The Dresden Dolls	Michael Pope
2004	"Coin-Operated Boy"	The Dresden Dolls	Michael Pope
2006	"Sing (The Alternate Cut)"	Yes, Virginia...	Michael Pope
2006	"Sing (Chapter II / Original)"	Yes, Virginia...	Michael Pope
2006	"Backstabber"	Yes, Virginia...	Michael Pope
2006	"Backstabber: The Dresden Dolls vs. Panic! at the Disco"	Yes, Virginia...	Michael Pope
2007	"Shores of California"	Yes, Virginia...	Andrew Bennett
2008	"Night Reconnaissance"	No, Virginia...	Michael Pope
