= The Onion Cellar =

Musical, cabaret show, rock concert and drama, Cambridge, MA, US (2006/2007)

The Onion Cellar was a jukebox musical featuring music by the Dresden Dolls which premiered at the American Repertory Theater's venue, the Zero Arrow Theater (now Club Oberon), in Cambridge, Massachusetts from December 9, 2006 to January 13, 2007. It combined cabaret show, rock concert and drama. It was conceived and written by Amanda Palmer, with Jonathan Marc Sherman, Marcus Stern, Christine Jones, Anthony Martignetti, and the cast. The running time was 1 hour and 45 minutes with no intermission.

== Overview ==
The titled alludes to a chapter in from Günter Grass's The Tin Drum. Here, the Onion Cellar is a bar in post-war Germany where people gather to share painful memories and cry. While drinking and talking, the clients peel onions, both to make crying easier and to lessen the shame for those afraid to express their feelings openly. In the production, characters speak and sign of pain, death, rejection and loneliness and of the relief found in sharing their sadness. The mixture of speech and song is consistent with the genre of the American musical, but style is more reminiscent of cabaret. There are also frequent performances by Palmer and Brian Viglione's duo The Dresden Dolls, who portray the house band of the Onion Cellar, as well as characters in the play.

Throughout the show the cast broke the fourth wall to address the audience and talk about the process whereby The Onion Cellar came into existence. Both inside the theatre and in the lobby, they have displayed letters and objects by fans, critics and audience members from earlier trial runs of the show. They intentionally mix genres and scenes of dramatic action. "The music, too, has a schizophrenic quality. The songs are sometimes in sync with the action; others feature counterpoint while still others are off in a world of their own."

it was never supposed to be a dark, dismal, sobfest as the article sort of implies: it was supposed to be an interactive environment with lots of confusion, fun, prankery, audience participation and also darker images about Grass himself, the holocaust, guilt, the creation of art in terms of grappling with the past and how we, as humans, try to come to terms with emotions that are difficult to face. - Amanda Palmer

== The company ==
The cast consisted of Remo Airaldi, Merritt Janson, Jeremy Geidt, Karen Macdonald, Kristen Frazier, Neil P. Stewart, Claire Elizabeth Davies, Thomas Derrah, Brian Farish, Brian Viglione and Amanda Palmer.

It was directed by Marcus Stern, stage managed by Jennifer Sturch, with set design by Christine Jones, costume design by Clint Ramos, lighting design by Justin Townsend, and sound design by David Remedios.

== The set list ==
The songs are integral to the plot of the show and were sprinkled throughout. Amanda Palmer and Brian Viglione perform throughout the show, including compositions originally from their previous albums.

- Introductory song (unreleased)
- "Necessary Evil" (from Yes, Virginia...)
- "Good Day" (from The Dresden Dolls)
- "Coin-Operated Boy" (from The Dresden Dolls)
- "The Gardener" (later released on No, Virginia)
- "Delilah" (from Yes, Virginia...)
- "Sex Changes" (from Yes, Virginia...)
- "Half Jack" (from The Dresden Dolls)
- "Sing" (from Yes, Virginia...)
