= Live: In Paradise =

Video by The Dresden Dolls
- Released: November 22, 2005
- Recorded: June 5, 2005
- Genre: Dark cabaret
- Length: 1:07:39
- Label: Roadrunner
- Producer: Pierre Lamoureux; Noah Blumenson-Cook

The Dresden Dolls chronology
Live: In Paradise (2005)	Live at the Roundhouse (2007)

Live: In Paradise is a live concert DVD by American dark cabaret duo The Dresden Dolls.

The Dresden Dolls hosted a free concert at the Paradise Rock Club in Boston on June 5, 2005. When a power outage unexpectedly delayed their performance, city streets became a temporary stage for some of the many performers (living statues, stilt-walkers, and fire-breathers) who had come from across the world to entertain audiences. The entire event—both concert and street performances—was filmed and the resulting DVD was released on November 22, 2005.

== Track listing ==
1. "Good Day" – 5:35
2. "Missed Me" – 4:49
3. "War Pigs" – 11:24
4. "Perfect Fit" – 5:40
5. "Christopher Lydon" – 4:57
6. "Bad Habit" – 3:29
7. "Half Jack" – 10:23
8. "Girl Anachronism" – 4:39
9. "Pierre" – 6:21
10. "Truce" – 8:21

Bonus features

Live at Roskilde Festival, Denmark 2005

- "Coin-Operated Boy" – 5:34
- "Girl Anachronism" – 3:18

Bonus videos

- "Coin-Operated Boy" – 3:43
- "Girl Anachronism" – 3:01
- "A Life in the Day of The Dresden Dolls" (documentary) – 53:54
- Preshow Featurette – 19:37

== Personnel ==
- Amanda Palmer - vocals, piano
- Brian Viglione - drums, vocals, guitar, bass
- Michael Pope – director
- Zea Barker – production design
- Pierre Lamoureux – producer
- Michael Pope – editor
- Zea Barker - co-editor
- Christopher Lydon – Master of Ceremonies
- Noah Blumenson-Cook – Production Coordinator
- Lee Barron – concert camera operator
- Maria Gambale – concert camera operator
- Michael Hobbs – concert camera operator
- James Holland – concert camera operator
- Wayne Kimball – concert camera operator
- Jake Liman – concert camera operator
- Dave McGlocklin – concert camera operator
- Scott Patterson – concert camera operator
- Robert Beinhocker – assistant camera
- Tom Buehler – camera system assistant
- Ben Vaughn – senior video engineer
- Scott Morabito – film lighting
- Doug Martin – video engineer
- Christina Bryant - art department key
- Jake Flowers – art department crew
- Brian Metzendorf – art department crew
- Davina Yannetty – art department crew
- Stephen Martin – production assistant
- Becca Rosenthal - "Special Thanks"
- Francois Lamoureux – audio producer
- Lonnie Bedell – recording engineer
- Greg Hanawalt – recording assistant
- Joel Simches - live audio
- Dave MacNamara - monitor mix
- Ron Nordin - still photography
- Bona Weiss - still photography
- Sheri Hausey - still photography
- Jeff Wasilko - still photography
- Kyle Cassidy - still photography
- Barnaby Whitfield - cover artwork
- Ben Richter - additional music
- Brian Carpenter / The Beat Circus - additional music
