= Michael Pope (filmmaker) =

American filmmaker (born 1963)

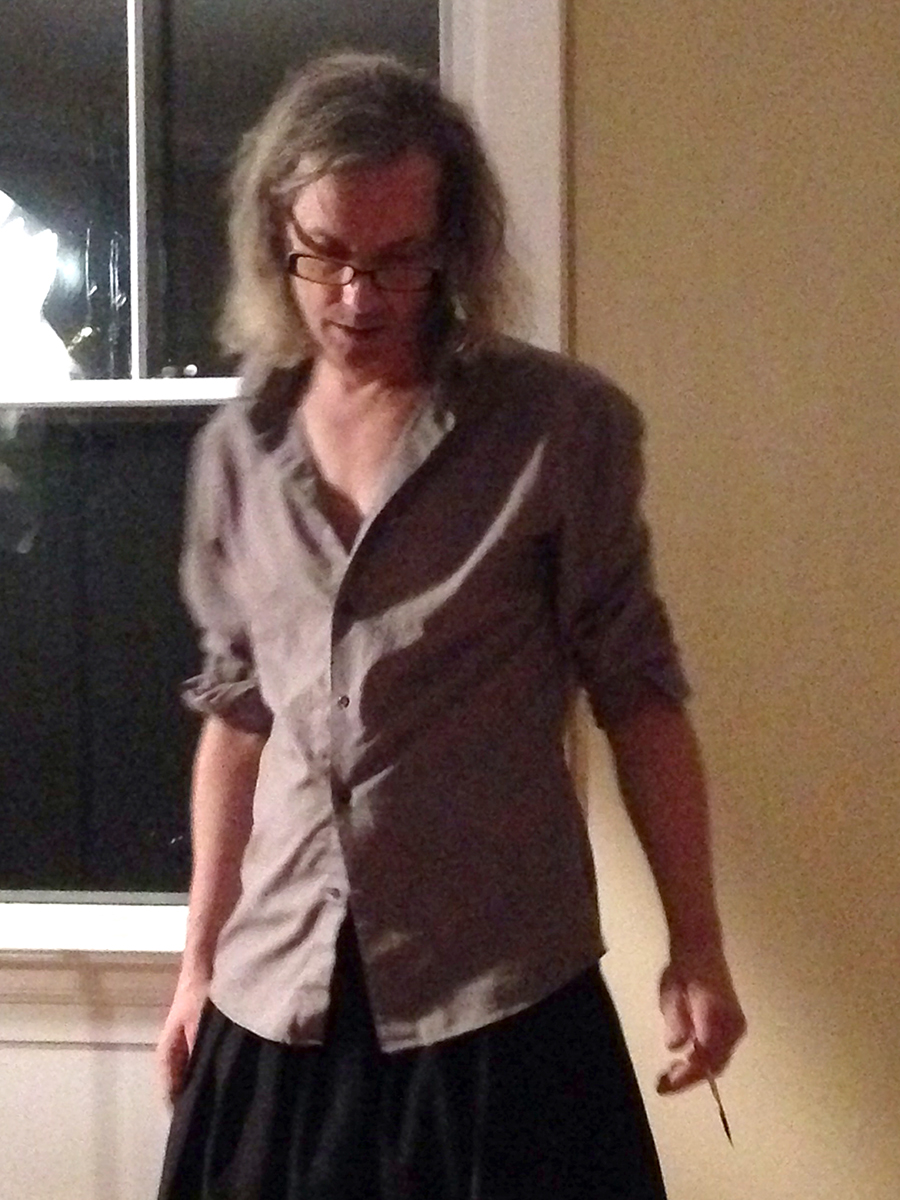
- Michael Pope on set
- Born: Michael Somervell Pope; September 27, 1963 (age 62); New York City, New York, U.S.
- Occupations: Film director, film producer, screenwriter
- Years active: 1994–present
- Website: www.michael-pope.com

Michael Somervell Pope (born September 27, 1963) is an American filmmaker, known for the independent feature film Neovoxer (2004).

== Profile ==
=== Neovoxer ===
Neovoxer was an experimental feature film. Showings included live performances of its musical score and sound effects, site-specific installation and other in-person performance. Pope was writer, director, editor and performed other roles in the project. He enlisted more than two hundred artists and artisans in the project in what he describes as a "Collective creative action". It was the first film by an American director to screen at the P1: International Biennial in the Czech Republic (2004), and earned him a Tanne Award for Outstanding Achievement (2000), which recognizes artists with outstanding achievements in their field.

=== Music videos with The Dresden Dolls and Amanda Palmer ===
Pope shot, cut and directed music videos for Boston locals The Dresden Dolls. He directed their first live concert/documentary DVD Live: In Paradise, among other collaborations. He directed the music video series “Who Killed Amanda Palmer: A Surrealist Mini Mystery”, in conjunction with the album and book release of the same name.

In 2009, Pope was commissioned by the Boston Pops to create a new film piece for their New Year's Eve show by Amanda Palmer. The film The Old & The New starred Jeremy Geidt and his wife.

=== Artist residencies and other work ===
Pope has received artist's residencies from E|Merge Interdisciplinary A.I.R. (2013), the Mobius Artists Group for Experimental Work in All Media (2001/2002), and the Experimental Television Center, (2000). His video art has shown at 31 Grand Gallery (NYC 2007/2008) curated by artist Barnaby Whitfield, as well as numerous site-specific installations in collaboration with The Nu Dance Theater (NYC/PARIS 2008).

In 2008, Pope traveled to Tehran as part of cross-cultural artist project "Send My Love To Iran" founded by BriAnna Olson

He has made music videos for Ben Folds, Gene Dante & The Future Starlets and other acts which aired on airing on MTV, LOGO and RAGE and appeared on People, Spin, Jezebel and Pitchfork websites.

=== SYNEMATIKA ===
In 2016, Pope began a new independent movie/transmedia project, SYNEMATIKA with a "three dimensional script" as a site-specific installation in a 2400-square foot industrial space in Kingston, NY. This was accomplished over the course of a thirty days lockdown endurance art, after which it was opened to the public for viewing and photographed to become a graphic "shooting bible" for the eventual movie.

== Personal information ==
Born and raised in New York City, Pope is a self-taught filmmaker. Growing up he had dyslexia and problems with truancy. Life experience; bike messenger, house painter and phone sex operator have proven to be the training ground for his film making. He made his first films on Super8 when he was 7 years old.

== Filmography ==
=== Original work ===
- "The Old & The New" (2009)
- "Bony Lil's Creation and Distraction" (2007)
- Neovoxer (2004)
- "Palace Hotel" (1992)
- "Sacred Nation" (1990)

=== Music videos and related ===
- "Map of Tasmania", Amanda Palmer, 2011
- "A Madness to His Method", Gene Dante and The Future Starlets 2009
- "Night Lies", (Bang Camaro) 2009
- "C Star" (Gene Dante and The Future Starlets), 2008
- Who Killed Amanda Palmer, Amanda Palmer, video series 2008 (produced by BriAnna Olson)
  - "Guitar Hero"
  - "Strength Through Music"
  - "The Point of It All"
  - "Runs in the Family"
  - "Ampersand"
  - "Astronaut"
- "Night Reconnaissance", The Dresden Dolls) 2008
- "Second Cousin", The Steamy Bohemians 2007
- "Learn to Live With What You Are", Ben Folds 2006
- "Backstabber: The Dresden Dolls vs. Panic! at the Disco", The Dresden Dolls 2006
- "Sing", The Dresden Dolls 2006
- Live: In Paradise, The Dresden Dolls concert documentary 2005
- "I Want You Now", Fluttr Effect 2004
- "Coin-Operated Boy", The Dresden Dolls 2004
- "Girl Anachronism", The Dresden Dolls 2003

== Fine Art: Exhibitions ==
- College Med: Journal Showcase (2009)
- 31 Grand Gallery (2008)
