= Theatre Is Evil =

Studio album by Amanda Palmer & The Grand Theft Orchestra
- Released: September 7, 2012
- Genre: Alternative rock
- Length: 71:16
- Label: 8 Ft. Records
- Producer: John Congleton

Amanda Palmer chronology
Amanda Palmer Goes Down Under (2011)	Theatre Is Evil (2012)	You Got Me Singing (2016)

Singles from Theatre Is Evil
- 1. "Do It with a Rockstar" Released: June 2012; 2. "Want It Back" Released: July 9, 2012; 3. "The Killing Type" Released: September 6, 2012; 4. "The Bed Song" Released: February 14, 2013

Theatre Is Evil is the second studio album by Amanda Palmer, and first with her band The Grand Theft Orchestra. It was released on September 7, 2012 in Australia, on September 10, 2012 in the United Kingdom and Europe, and September 11, 2012 in the United States and Canada. The album has been released by Palmer's own record label, 8 Ft. Records, with distribution handled by Cooking Vinyl in the UK and Europe, and Alliance Entertainment in the US.

The album debuted at No. 10 on the Billboard 200 chart with 24,000 copies sold, according to Nielsen SoundScan, much of which can be attributed to her Kickstarter campaign.

The album was written over the four years since her solo debut album, Who Killed Amanda Palmer, in 2008. The recording and release process was funded by a Kickstarter project that raised a total of over $1.2 million.

An art book, filled with images inspired by the content of this album commissioned to artists Amanda knows, has been released.

== About the Grand Theft Orchestra ==
The Grand Theft Orchestra is composed of Amanda Palmer, Michael McQuilken on drums, guitarist Chad Raines, and Jherek Bischoff on bass. Thor Harris replaced McQuilken for the second half of the live tour of this album. The band regularly switches instruments during their live performance, including in their version of The Dresden Dolls's song "Missed Me".

== Title ==
After posting the album name to her Twitter account, there was a debate amongst fans about whether the album should be spelled "Theater Is Evil" or "Theatre Is Evil". Palmer took a vote and "Theatre Is Evil" eventually won, causing some of the CDs to have to be reprinted.

== Kickstarter ==
The album was crowdfunded by $1,192,793.00 pledged via Kickstarter. Backers could choose from a number of bundles offered for different investment amounts. At the time it closed, this was the most successful Kickstarter campaign by any musician.

== Promotion ==
The song "Do It With a Rockstar" was released on a limited basis to promote the album in June 2012, followed by "Trout Heart Replica", "Want It Back" and "The Killing Type".

In September 2015, in promotion of the album, an EP called Selections from Theatre is Evil was released.

On December 19, 2015, a piano demo of "Grown Man Cry" recorded in 2007 was released.

On December 23, 2015, a demo of the song "Bottomfeeder," under the name "Raggin' On The Man", was released.

== Music videos ==
The first music video released for this album was a stop-motion video for the song "Want It Back" and features Amanda Palmer prominently nude on a bed with the rest of the bandmates, clothed, as the lyrics to the song crawl across their bodies. It was "filmed on and around Brunswick Street in Melbourne, Australia in March 2012" and was produced, edited, and directed by Jim Batt.

The second music video was for "The Killing Type," directed by Tim Pope, who had previously directed many videos for The Cure. It features scenes from the band playing in an all-white room, dressed in all-white clothes, playing all-white instruments and another scene where Amanda seems to contemplate killing her lover while in bed with him. A music video for "The Bed Song" was also shot as part of the band's residency at Bard College in Annandale-on-Hudson, New York, which was the first residency in a new program led by Gideon Lester, to have artists do their work with student assistance on campus. The video was released February 14, 2013.

Amanda Palmer has also released lyric videos for every song on the main disc of Theatre Is Evil on her YouTube channel.

Through Patreon donations, a retroactive music video was produced for "Grown Man Cry" and released on July 27, 2017.

== Tour ==
Palmer planned an extensive tour schedule in support of the album. In June 2012, Amanda Palmer and the Grand Theft Orchestra began with a short six-date stint of small club shows throughout Europe and the US, beginning in Berlin and ending in Boston. A full-scale tour began on September 10, 2012, this time reaching 33 cities throughout North America and Europe. According to Palmer's husband, she planned to spend approximately 14 months on the road in support of Theatre Is Evil.

=== Controversy ===
A controversy arose at the start of the full-scale tour, when Palmer crowdsourced volunteer horn and string players among her fans to back the Grand Theft Orchestra onstage for a few songs in each city. She was criticized, most notably by Steve Albini, who questioned her for asking for further indulgences from her audience. Palmer had explained that most of the Kickstarter money was actually spent on covering the cost of creating the album, producing and shipping the rewards, and setting up the tour. Albini called the breakdown "absurdly inefficient".

On September 14, 2012, following an article in the New York Times Palmer wrote on her blog that she considered the issue to be about artists' choice more than anything else.

On September 19, 2012, Palmer announced that she had decided to pay the volunteer musicians. This included retroactive payment to volunteers at the start of the tour.

== Critical reception ==
Professional ratings
Aggregate scores
Source	Rating
Metacritic	83/100
Review scores
Source	Rating
AllMusic	4/5 stars
Alternative Press	4/5 stars
Beats Per Minute	78%
Drowned in Sound	8/10
The Guardian	4/5 stars
The Independent	5/5 stars
Paste	8.7/10
PopMatters	9/10
Q	4/5 stars
Rolling Stone	3.5/5 stars

On July 11, 2012, Ben Folds, fellow friend, producer and musician, posted the very first review of Theatre Is Evil on his Facebook page, stating that he was "listening to 'Theatre is Evil' everyday, more than once. It's good. It's really good," and in summary that, "This record is as good as it gets. You're going to shit when you hear it. It's going to be around for ages. Otherwise, it's total crap."

Kate Mossman of The Guardian wrote: "Theatre Is Evil feels like sitting on the bed of your tattooed, far cooler cousin 30 years ago, while she tells you 'all you need to know' about music." Adam Rathe of Spin said: "If Theatre Is Evil does anything, it should make clear that [Amanda] Palmer's not just a fundraiser par excellence but someone who's energized enough people with her work to be able to create exactly the kind of record that makes people love music in the first place."

== Track listing ==
All tracks are written by Amanda Palmer, except where noted.

No.	Title	Writer(s)	Length
1.	"Meow Meow Introduces The Grand Theft Orchestra"		0:18
2.	"Smile (Pictures or It Didn't Happen)"		6:28
3.	"The Killing Type"		4:29
4.	"Do It with a Rockstar"		4:25
5.	"Want It Back"		4:09
6.	"Grown Man Cry"		5:16
7.	"Trout Heart Replica"		7:09
8.	"A Grand Theft Intermission"	Jherek Bischoff	2:07
9.	"Lost"		4:31
10.	"Bottomfeeder"		6:13
11.	"The Bed Song"		6:07
12.	"Massachusetts Avenue"		4:40
13.	"Melody Dean"		4:02
14.	"Berlin"		7:17
15.	"Olly Olly Oxen Free"		4:06

iTunes bonus track
No.	Title	Length
16.	"The Living Room"	7:12

Australian bonus track
No.	Title	Length
16.	"Denial Thing"	2:57

Kickstarter bonus tracks
No.	Title	Length
16.	"Denial Thing"	2:57
17.	"The Living Room"	7:12
18.	"Ukulele Anthem"	5:32
19.	"From St. Kilda To Fitzroy"	4:55

Kickstarter Deluxe bonus tracks
No.	Title	Writer(s)	Length
20.	"Video Games" (featuring Dot.AY) (Lana Del Rey cover)	Elizabeth Grant, Justin Parker	5:00
21.	"Provanity"		3:58
22.	"The Assistant"		4:41
23.	"Not Mine"		2:52

Commentary album
No.	Title	Writer(s)	Length
1.	"Theatre Is Evil Intro (Commentary)"		1:03
2.	"On Meow Meow's Introduction"		0:53
3.	"Meow Meow Introduces The Grand Theft Orchestra"		0:18
4.	"Smile (Pictures or It Didn't Happen) (Commentary)"		1:28
5.	"Smile (Pictures or It Didn't Happen)"		6:28
6.	"The Killing Type (Commentary)"		1:32
7.	"The Killing Type"		4:29
8.	"Do It with a Rockstar (Commentary)"		1:04
9.	"Do It with a Rockstar"		4:25
10.	"Want It Back (Commentary)"		1:08
11.	"Want It Back"		4:09
12.	"Grown Man Cry (Commentary)"		1:36
13.	"Grown Man Cry"		5:16
14.	"Trout Heart Replica (Commentary)"		1:41
15.	"Trout Heart Replica"		7:09
16.	"A Grand Theft Intermission (Commentary)"		0:57
17.	"A Grand Theft Intermission"	Jherek Bischoff	2:07
18.	"Lost (Commentary)"		1:55
19.	"Lost"		4:31
20.	"Bottomfeeder (Commentary)"		0:36
21.	"Bottomfeeder"		6:13
22.	"The Bed Song (Commentary)"		1:45
23.	"The Bed Song"		6:07
24.	"Massachusetts Avenue (Commentary)"		1:45
25.	"Massachusetts Avenue"		4:40
26.	"Melody Dean (Commentary)"		0:57
27.	"Melody Dean"		4:02
28.	"Berlin (Commentary)"		1:04
29.	"Berlin"		7:17
30.	"Olly Olly Oxen Free (Commentary)"		1:30
31.	"Olly Olly Oxen Free"		4:06

=== Selections from Theatre Is Evil ===
Before the release of the album, Palmer sent a free 3-track digital download EP to fans through her newsletter, titled "Selection from Theatre Is Evil" featuring three promotional singles.

All tracks are written by Amanda Palmer, except where noted.

No.	Title	Length
1.	"Want It Back"	4:09
2.	"Trout Heart Replica"	7:09
3.	"Do It with a Rockstar"	4:25

== Piano Is Evil ==
On July 27, 2017, Palmer released an acoustic remix album titled Piano Is Evil. It is a track-by-track cover of Theatre Is Evil (excluding the Intro and Intermission) performed solely by Palmer on piano.

== Personnel ==
=== Amanda Palmer & The Grand Theft Orchestra ===
- Amanda Palmer – vocals, piano, synthesizers
- Jherek Bischoff – vocals, upright bass, guitar
- Michael McQuilken – vocals, drums, percussion, programming (Thor Harris replaced McQuilken for the second half of the live tour of this album.)
- Chad Raines – vocals, guitar, trumpet, keyboards, programming

=== Guest musicians ===
- Meow Meow featured on "Meow Meow Introduces The Grand Theft Orchestra"
- "Trout Heart Replica": Paris Hurley - violin 1 & 2, Alex Guy - viola, Maria Scherer Wilson - cello, Paul Kikuchi - concert bass drum, orchestra arrangement by Jherek Bischoff
- "A Grand Theft Intermission": Paris Hurley - violin 1 & 2, Alex Guy - viola, Maria Scherer Wilson - cello, Horns: Mick Fraser, Benjamin Gillespie, Eamon McNelis, Phil Noy, and Paul Willy, orchestral arrangement by Jherek Bischoff
- "Melody Dean" features David J on bass
- "Massachusetts Avenue", "Berlin", and "Olly Olly Oxen Free": Horns by Mick Fraser, Benjamin Gillespie, Eamon McNelis, Phil Noy, and Paul Willy. Horn arrangements by Chad Raines

=== Production ===
- Produced by John Congleton at Sing Sing Studios (Melbourne, Australia)
- Assistant Engineer: Adam Dobos
- Mixed by John Congleton at Elmwood Studios (Dallas, Texas)
- Mastered by Greg Calbi at Sterling Sound (New York, New York)

== Charts ==
Chart (2012)	Peak position
Australian Albums (ARIA)	34
US Billboard 200	10
US Independent Albums (Billboard)	3
US Top Alternative Albums (Billboard)	18
US Top Rock Albums (Billboard)	8
