= The Virginia Monologues =

Compilation album by The Dresden Dolls
- Released: April 18, 2015
- Recorded: 2003 – January 2008 at Mad Oak Studios, Allston, Massachusetts; September 10–20, 2005 at Allaire Studios, Shokan, NY (Recording); November 2005 at Camp Street Studios, Cambridge, MA (Extra recording and mixing)
- Genres: Piano rock, alternative rock, dark cabaret
- Length: 104:10
- Label: Rhino
- Producers: Sean Slade, Paul Q. Kolderie, and The Dresden Dolls

The Dresden Dolls chronology
No, Virginia... (2008)	The Virginia Monologues (2015)

The Virginia Monologues is the second compilation album by American dark cabaret band The Dresden Dolls, released in April 2015 on Record Store Day. It is a three-LP vinyl compilation of the albums Yes, Virginia... (2006) and No, Virginia... (2008). This release marks the first time Yes, Virginia... was put out on vinyl. Three different color LPs are housed in a tri-pocket, book-like gate-fold jacket. The release run was limited to 9000 copies.

== Track listing ==
All tracks are written by Amanda Palmer, except 21 by The Psychedelic Furs.

No.	Title	Length
1.	"Sex Changes"	4:11
2.	"Backstabber"	4:11
3.	"Modern Moonlight"	4:45
4.	"My Alcoholic Friends"	2:47
5.	"Delilah"	6:54
6.	"Dirty Business"	3:36
7.	"First Orgasm"	3:49
8.	"Mrs. O."	4:40
9.	"Shores of California"	3:35
10.	"Necessary Evil"	2:54
11.	"Mandy Goes to Med School"	4:39
12.	"Me & the Minibar"	4:35
13.	"Sing"	4:40
14.	"Dear Jenny"	3:07
15.	"Night Reconnaissance"	3:56
16.	"The Mouse and the Model"	6:02
17.	"Ultima Esperanza"	4:33
18.	"The Gardener"	5:08
19.	"Lonesome Organist Rapes Page-Turner"	3:42
20.	"Sorry Bunch"	3:09
21.	"Pretty in Pink"	3:57
22.	"The Kill"	3:49
23.	"The Sheep Song"	3:59
24.	"Boston"	7:20

== Personnel ==
- Amanda Palmer – vocals, piano, Mellotron, and organ.
- Brian Viglione – drums, percussion, vocals, bass guitar, and guitar.
- Sean Slade, Paul Q. Kolderie, and The Dresden Dolls – producers
- Benny Grotto, Paul Q. Kolderie, Sean Slade – mixer
- Paul Q. Kolderie, Benny Grotto, Adam Taylor – engineering
- Holly Brewer and Matt McNiss – choir
- Holly Brewer, Whitney Moses, and Mali Sastri – Backing vocals on 'Delilah'
- George Marino – mastering
