= The Dresden Dolls (EP) =

EP by The Dresden Dolls
- Released: November 19, 2001
- Genre: Dark cabaret
- Length: 25:13
- Label: Self-released

The Dresden Dolls chronology
The Dresden Dolls (2001)	A Is for Accident (2003)

The Dresden Dolls is the self-titled debut EP by American dark cabaret band The Dresden Dolls, released in 2001. It is a completely separate release from the band's 2003 debut studio album, also titled The Dresden Dolls.

The CD was recorded and engineered at Sonics Studios and at Emerson College in Boston, MA by Owen Curtin in 2001 and mastered by Noah-Blumenson Cook, with guest Brian Knoth playing a guitar solo on "Good Day".

The album was first sold at the band's first appearance at The Middle East in Cambridge, MA. The band made 50 copies, all of which were sold at the show. The covers are slightly different from copies sold later.

The EP was sold by the band at shows until late 2003, via mail order until early 2004, and from drummer Brian Viglione while he was working at Toscanini's, an ice cream parlor in Cambridge. The EP is now completely out of print, although "Girl Anachronism" has been made available for download from the band's official web site.

It is unknown exactly how many copies exist, although singer Amanda Palmer has estimated that "a few thousand copies" exist.

== Track listing ==
1. "Half Jack" – 5:25
2. "Girl Anachronism" – 3:01
3. "The Perfect Fit" – 5:40
4. "Colorblind" – 5:31
5. "Good Day" – 5:36
- Note: The songs on the EP are demos.

== Album personnel ==
- Amanda Palmer – piano and vocals
- Brian Viglione – drums, acoustic guitar, bass
- Brian Knoth – guitar on "Good Day"
- Owen Curtin – recording and engineering
- Noah-Blumenson Cook – mastering
