= Brainclaw =

American industrial/electronic music project

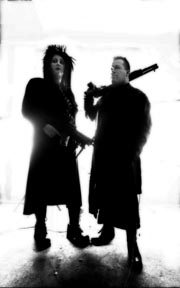
- 2006 promotional photo of Tara and David of Brainclaw; Photography by Kyle Cassidy

Background information
- Origin: Ithaca College, New York, USA
- Genres: industrial, electronic music
- Years active: 1989–present
- Label: Auroviral
- Members: David Giuffre
- Past members: Tara Lessard, James Sewell, Lorie Kleeman, Kim Thompson, John Ruszin
- Website: Official website

Brainclaw is an industrial/electronic music project initially created at Ithaca College, New York in 1989 by David Giuffre. The band centers on Giuffre, but features many guest artists on its releases. Notable songs are "Insekt/Angel" and "When The Dark Rains Come" which were used on the DVD releases of The Matrix Revolutions, The Matrix Box Set and the Spider-Man Collector's Edition. Brainclaw was signed to BLC Productions in Little Rock, Arkansas, and briefly to UK label, Juggernaut Music Group. The band is currently releasing music under its own imprint, Auroviral.

== Early years ==
The Brainclaw project began as an ongoing experiment in composing aggressive electronic music, born at Ithaca College in 1989. Pennsylvania, USA-native David Giuffre decided to begin composing more polished compositions with the result of publishing a full album of electro-industrial music, using the large body of mostly unfocused and unfinished work he had created up to that point, from 1985 to 1988. He continued to accumulate new music gear and build what would eventually become Studio Auroviral.

The result of this work was an album of music called Infrastrukture. Six more albums followed, (Painselectiv - 1991, Shrieking In Standby - 1993, Sect - 1994, Treason - 1996, Strange Protection - 1997 and the abortive half album, Bodyhorror - 1998) each building on the work of the previous one, slowly refining both recording technique and compositional structure. There was no serious attempt to release this music until mp3.com offered an inexpensive route for musical exposure.

== Other projects ==
In 1997, David was recruited to write and play in the newly-forming Philadelphia Goth Rock outfit, Carfax Abbey. This effectively put the Brainclaw project on hold. David wrote, sang and toured with this band for five years. After the band began moving in a different musical direction, David amiably parted ways with Carfax in early 2002, to make a serious attempt at rejuvenating the Brainclaw project. The project became more focused with the addition of partner Tara Giuffre. They began co-writing the new Brainclaw material.

== Debut album ==
As new songs were completed and released, internet radio stations began noticing the music, and began lending their support with plays of the new songs and reviews. The Official Brainclaw Website was completely re-designed. The selection of the song "Downsect" for the Spiderbite Studios CD compilation called Perversions of Industry would prove to be a far-reaching event, right into the present day. Brainclaw songs began climbing electronic music charts on the internet and alternative radio stations in many parts of the world. The rest of 2002 was spent writing songs, getting press and club/radio spins and promoting at events. The Insekt/Angel CD was self-released on March 1.

== Warner Brothers and Columbia TriStar ==
2003 began with the band's first professional photoshoots by Philadelphia photographer Kyle Cassidy, further modifications and upgrades to the Official Brainclaw Website and a re-uniting with old bandmates in Carfax Abbey, who approached David and Tara with the idea of fleshing out and recording songs for Carfax’s full-length release, Second Skin. The latter half of the year saw increased activity in the press, with reviews of Brainclaw’s Promo EP CD, especially a positive review in Industrial Nation magazine. They finished up the Carfax Abbey CD as the year closed, having recorded and produced six new songs, and began preparations for the release of their own full-length CD, called Insekt/Angel. As the year ended, Warner Brothers, alerted to Brainclaw music because of the Spiderbite compilation appearance of a year ago, licensed the song "When the Dark Rains Come" for use in the DVD release of Matrix Revolutions.

More worldwide publicity followed, as Columbia TriStar Motion Picture Group licensed "When The Dark Rains Come" and "Insekt/Angel" for use on the DVD release of the Spider-Man Collector’s Edition DVD. The new Brainclaw CD was finally released to an increasingly interested electronic music community, and reviews and support began arriving internationally, as well as from North America. Then, the Insekt/Angel CD was picked up for distribution by Metropolis Records.

== Live shows ==
David and Tara decided to bring a live Brainclaw show to the stage, and using the experience gained from five years touring with Carfax Abbey, the duo began fleshing out a stage performance set. James Sewell of Divers Lust came on board as a live drummer. Keyboardist Lorie K of Suture Seven also joined the live Brainclaw show. The 2004 shows were well-attended and reviewed, with a somewhat lighter schedule for the summer 2005 tour, to allow for the writing of a follow-up album to Insekt/Angel. Warner Brothers also licensed four more songs from Insekt/Angel for the Matrix DVD Box Set. In Spring, 2006 Lorie K. had a wonderful opportunity in early 2006 to relocate to Germany to pursue other projects, so the search began for a new live synthesist.

== Signing with BLC ==
In February, 2006, Brainclaw signed a deal with Arkansas-based independent label BLC Productions. The new Brainclaw CD, called Dead Monsters was released on BLC in both North America and Europe in April, 2006. Press opportunities and reviews occurred in such international publications as UK-based Kaleidoscope and Germany's Side-Line magazine.

In June, 2006, Kimberly Holler joined up as synthesist for live shows, and the Brainclaw Website was completely rebuilt around a totally interactive blog format. Brainclaw’s cover of "Work Hard" was selected to appear on the new Cryonica Music Depeche Mode Tribute CD, Bright Lights, Dark Room in the UK.

== Personnel changes and the nascent Deceptor album ==
With the separation and divorce of David and Tara in 2009, and Tara's decision to leave the band in 2011, the nearly completed new album Deceptor was temporarily put on hold. Brainclaw collaborated with Japan's Kenji Siratori and released "Regenerator P.I.G." which was subsequently chosen for the trailer for Diehard 4's Japanese release. David rejoined Carfax Abbey as live synthesist, writer and producer and helped create Carfax's newest album, Caustic Revolution. In 2012, David began revamping the Deceptor album with live guitar tracks added by Carfax Abbey guitarist John Ruszin, with intentions of a late 2013/early 2014 release. During this time BLC Productions released Brainclaw from its contract to pursue other opportunities, after the death of its owner, Brandon Clarke.

== Signing With Juggernaut Music Group ==
In August 2014, Brainclaw and Juggernaut Music Group announced via a dual statement that they would be releasing Deceptor for a Christmas 2014 release.

== Long Absence, re-emergence and final release of Deceptor album ==
In 2015, just before the release of Deceptor, Juggernaut Music Group was dissolved by its ownership, and Brainclaw was released from its contract. David had remarried by then, and became a stepfather to two boys. David worked on small projects in the interim, including a Brainclaw remix of UK artist Stephen Wilkins' (LV426) song "We Are Random," writing and singing new lyrics, with new production and remixing. Parenting and work as Manager of Media Services in New York City for Infobase Publishing became the focus, and David's first biological child was born in May 2015, keeping his concentration on his family for some time. In summer of 2018, Brainclaw's music was chosen to appear in horror film Cherokee Creek, with special mixes of "Voluptuosa" and "Unsafe" appearing in the film. In December 2019, Tara Lessard, long-time Brainclaw collaborator and former wife of David, succumbed to a long term illness and passed away. This event, coupled with the COVID-19 lockdown, fueled David's desire to complete and release the languishing Deceptor album. David designed and completed cover artwork, and remastered all master audio tracks for the recording. Digital distributors were contacted and artwork and tracks were submitted for distribution. The album was released officially on May 1, 2020. During early August 2021, David began writing new Brainclaw material, with the intent of a new album release in 2022.

== Discography ==
Album Releases:

- Infrastrukture (1989 - out of print)
- Painselectiv (1991 - out of print)
- Shrieking In Standby (1993 - out of print)
- Treason (1996 - out of print)
- Strange Protection (1997 - out of print)
- Bodyhorror/Sect (1998 - out of print)
- Insekt/Angel (2004 - self-release, distributed internationally by Metropolis Records)
- Dead Monsters (2006 - BLC Productions in North America, E-Noxe and Al!ve in Europe)
- Deceptor (2020 - Auroviral)

Compilation Appearances:

- Perversions Of Industry (2003 - Spiderbite Studios)
- Interbreeding III: Xenophobic (2004 - BLC Productions)
- Interbreeding IV: Gefahrlich (2004 - BLC Productions)
- Interbreeding V: Subhuman - The Alien Agenda (2005) - BLC Productions)
- Interbreeding VII: Natural Enemies (2005 - BLC Productions)
- Electro/R/Evolution Volume 1 (2005 - Static Sky Records)
- Cryonica Tanz Volume 4 (2006 - Cryonica Music)
- Interbreeding VIII: Elements Of Violence (2006 - BLC Productions)
- Bright Lights, Dark Room: Depeche Mode Tribute (2006 - Cryonica Music)
- Interbreeding IX: Kuru (2007 - BLC Productions)
- Weatherhead 3 (2008 - Hypervoxx/Telegrammetry Rocordings)
