= Amanda Palmer Goes Down Under =

Live album by Amanda Palmer
- Released: January 21, 2011
- Recorded: Sydney Opera House; Adelaide Fringe Festival; Wellington
- Genres: Alternative rock; dark cabaret
- Length: 57:04
- Label: Liberator
- Producers: Amanda Palmer; Mick Wordley

Amanda Palmer chronology
Amanda Palmer Performs the Popular Hits of Radiohead on Her Magical Ukulele (2010)	Amanda Palmer Goes Down Under (2011)	Theatre Is Evil (2012)

Singles from Amanda Palmer Goes Down Under
- 1. "Map of Tasmania" Released: December 12, 2010; 2. "On an Unknown Beach" Released: February 24, 2011; 3. "In My Mind" Released: March 2, 2011

Amanda Palmer Goes Down Under is the first live album by Amanda Palmer, released on January 21, 2011, through Liberator Music in Australia and New Zealand and self-released worldwide via Palmer's Bandcamp and through her merchandise company Post-War Trade. It contains live performances of Palmer's performances in Australia, as well as studio recordings of the album's three singles "Map of Tasmania", "On an Unknown Beach", and "In My Mind". The album has an Antipodean theme and features songs Palmer wrote about, or while in, Australia and New Zealand, throughout her early 2010 Australasian tour.

The first single "Map of Tasmania" featuring The Young Punx, was released on Palmer's Bandcamp music website. The song's music video, directed by Michael Pope, premiered on Spin's website on January 13, 2011. A remix of the song was also created, including an altered music video featuring a cameo from Canadian electronic musician Peaches.

On January 30, 2011, the album debuted at No. 25 on the Australian ARIA Albums Chart.

The song "In My Mind" was featured in the soundtrack of the 2015 game Life Is Strange.

== Reception ==
Professional ratings
Aggregate scores
Source	Rating
Metacritic	74/100
Review scores
Source	Rating
Allmusic	3/5 stars
The A.V. Club	B
The Independent	8/10
musicOMH	3.5/5 stars
PopMatters	7/10 stars

The album has received a score of 74/100 on media aggregate site Metacritic indicating "generally favorable reviews". Simon Price of The Independent called the album "touching, witty, and like everything else the Bostonian ever does, brilliant" Kyle Ryan of The A.V. Club reviewed the album positively, saying "But the album's best moments happen when Palmer settles down and plays by herself, like on "On An Unknown Beach" or "Australia," or her cover of Nick Cave's "The Ship Song," which closes the breezy album with a quietly devastating reminder of Palmer's considerable talent."

== Track listing ==
No.	Title	Writer(s)	Length
1.	"Makin' Whoopee" (Recorded live at Sydney Opera House)	Walter Donaldson; Gus Kahn	4:56
2.	"Australia" (Recorded live at Sydney Opera House)	Amanda Palmer	5:45
3.	"Vegemite (The Black Death)" (Recorded live at Sydney Opera House)	Palmer	4:53
4.	"Map of Tasmania" (featuring The Young Punx)	Palmer; Hal Ritson; Michele Balduzzi	2:44
5.	"In My Mind" (featuring Brian Viglione)	Palmer	4:16
6.	"Bad Wine and Lemon Cake" (with The Jane Austen Argument; Recorded live at Adelaide Fringe Festival)	Tom Dickins	5:49
7.	"New Zealand" (Recorded live in Wellington)	Palmer	4:41
8.	"On an Unknown Beach"	Peter Jefferies	5:47
9.	"We're Happy Little Vegemites" (Recorded live at Sydney Opera House)	J. Walter Thompson Advertising Agency	1:24
10.	"Doctor Oz" (Recorded live at Sydney Opera House)	Palmer	4:54
11.	"A Formidable Marinade" (with Mikelangelo and Lance Horne; Recorded live at Sydney Opera House)	Mikelangelo	5:57
12.	"The Ship Song" (Recorded live at Sydney Opera House)	Nick Cave	6:08

== Charts ==
Chart performance for Amanda Palmer Goes Down Under
Chart (2011)	Peak position
Australian Albums (ARIA)	25
