= Armed America =

Book by Kyle Cassidy

Armed America: Portraits of Gun Owners in Their Homes
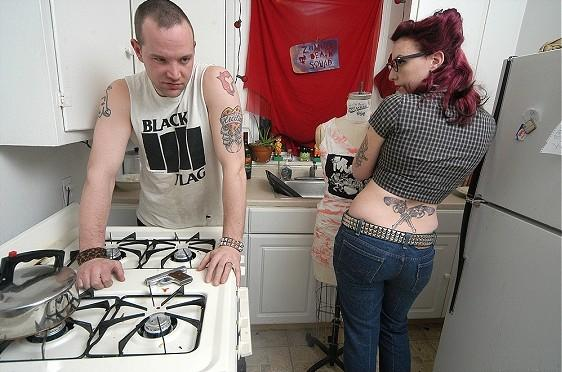
- Chris with his Raven Arms .25, Cecilia with her six-gun tattoos.
- Author: Kyle Cassidy
- Publisher: Krause Publications
- Publication date: 2006
- ISBN: 0-89689-543-2
- OCLC: 132305959
- Dewey Decimal: 779.936333092273 22
- LC Class: TR680 .C385 2007

Armed America: Portraits of Gun Owners in Their Homes, published in 2006 by Krause Publications, is a book by American photographer Kyle Cassidy. The book examines American gun owners and their reasons for owning firearms.
