= Who Killed Amanda Palmer =

Studio album by Amanda Palmer
- Released: September 16, 2008
- Recorded: 2007–2008 in Nashville, Tennessee, Seattle, Cotati, California, San Francisco, and Edinburgh, Scotland
- Genres: Dark cabaret, alternative rock
- Length: 53:12
- Label: Roadrunner
- Producers: Ben Folds and Amanda Palmer

Amanda Palmer chronology
Amanda Palmer (1997)	Who Killed Amanda Palmer (2008)	Amanda Palmer Performs the Popular Hits of Radiohead on Her Magical Ukulele (2010)

Singles from Who Killed Amanda Palmer
- 1. "Leeds United" Released: November 2008; 2. "Oasis" Released: February 3, 2009

Who Killed Amanda Palmer is the debut studio album by American singer-songwriter Amanda Palmer. The album was largely recorded in Nashville, Tennessee, with collaborator Ben Folds and was released by Roadrunner Records on 16 September 2008. The title is a reference to the series Twin Peaks, which revolves around events surrounding the death of Laura Palmer.

== Background ==
Certain tracks also featured Folds on percussion and keyboards, and Zoë Keating on cello.

In 2007, Palmer self-released the song "I Will Follow You into the Dark", a cover of the Death Cab for Cutie song, on her Myspace. The ID3 tags listed the source album as Nashville. Fans discussed the possibility of the solo album having this name, but Palmer dispelled rumors on an internet forum devoted to her group Dresden Dolls, stating:

that was titled 'nashville' because that is the location that i am recording the solo album....in nashville, at ben folds' studio, with ben, who is producing the record and playing on it. [...] it will not be the album title unless i decide to confuse everybody and come up with an album title that will throw EVERYBODY

....ie 'nashville blues'

in which case shoot me

Palmer also revealed that the song would not be on the album, instead releasing it on Peace (for Mom), a compilation released by Brainwashed Recordings.

Palmer confirmed to the Boston Phoenix in April 2007 that the album was indeed titled Who Killed Amanda Palmer, although another working title was That's Amanda Fucking Palmer to You. She joked that the latter was unlikely to encourage being stocked at supermarket chain Wal-Mart.

On the overall feel of the record, Palmer said:

A lot of the songs are piano ballads that never found a home on a Dolls record, because I hadn't wanted to overload the record with slow material. But there's a really intense, exciting energy to the tracks at the same time. It definitely won't drag.

Additionally, she has said: "We've been adding everything from organs and Leslie cabinets [keyboard speaker] to strings, horns, and tympani. The final result should be biblical."

In November 2007, members of Estradasphere started touring with Palmer, as well as helping to produce this album.

Palmer part funded the production with $80,000 of her own money. She later regretted that decision, as Roadrunner's royalty rates (of $1 per album sale) meant she would likely never recoup the money.

The magazine Alternative Press named this album one of the "Most Anticipated Albums of 2008".

In an interview on April 20, 2008, Palmer told Hayley Rosenblum on her WHRW (Binghamton University's radio station) show, Penguins in the Desert, that the release date would be September 16, 2008. She also mentioned that the album would be remastered on April 25 because Ben was not happy with the original mastering job. A later blog post by Amanda indicated that the album has been remastered at least three times. A companion book created in conjunction with Neil Gaiman was also mentioned. Roadrunner Records later confirmed that the book would be a book of photography. Photographer Kyle Cassidy confirmed on June 30 that the book would be written by Neil, with Kyle laying out, designing, and supplying photography for the book.

In an interview with Songfacts, Palmer explained that "Leeds United" was inspired by losing a Leeds United football shirt that was given to her by Ricky Wilson of the English band Kaiser Chiefs.

On September 5, 2008, Palmer revealed pre-orders for the album would begin on Monday September 8, 2008, via her new web site, whokilledamandapalmer.com.

== Music videos ==
Music videos for seven of the tracks from Who Killed Amanda Palmer ("Astronaut", "Ampersand", "Runs in the Family", "The Point of It All", "Strength Through Music", "Guitar Hero", and "Another Year") all formed part of the Who Killed Amanda Palmer video series, directed by Michael Pope. These videos are all connected, and spoken word material can be heard at the end of several of the tracks. "Another Year" serves as the credits song and a video exclusive instrumental version during the intro. A cover of "Everybody's Gotta Live" by Love is featured in the epilogue.

Separate videos for "Oasis" (directed by Pope), "Leeds United" (directed by Alex de Campi), "What's the Use of Wond'rin'?" (directed by Pope), and "Blake Says" (directed by Steven Mitchell Wright) were released on February 3, February 26, March 11, and December 20, 2009 respectively.

=== "Leeds United" controversy ===
In November 2008, Palmer refused her record label's demand that she remove shots of her "uncommercially fat" stomach from the "Leeds United" video. There was much controversy over these demands, eventually resulting in a fan protest that became known as "The reBELLYon". Fans posted photos of their stomachs on Dresden Dolls/Amanda Palmer fan site "Shadowbox", and eventually sent the photos to Palmer's label, Roadrunner Records, to prove their point. Palmer was successful in being dropped from the label, and released a free song, entitled "Do You Swear to Tell the Truth, the Whole Truth, and Nothing but the Truth, So Help Your Black Ass", in celebration.

== WKAPFM ==
As a promotional game for the release of Who Killed Amanda Palmer, a fake radio site, WKAP-FM, was set up with clues to her alleged disappearance. The alternate reality game was designed and curated by musician Olga Nunes.

== Critical reception ==
Professional ratings
Aggregate scores
Source	Rating
Metacritic	78/100
Review scores
Source	Rating
Alternative Press	4/5 stars
Allmusic	2.5/5 stars
Drowned in Sound	7/10 stars
musicOMH	4.5/5 stars
Pitchfork Media	(7.4/10)
Spin	3.5/5 stars
The Guardian	4/5 stars
PopMatters	7/10 stars
The A.V. Club	(B)

The album has received a score of 78/100 from media aggregate site Metacritic indicating "generally favorable reviews". Joshua Klein of Pitchfork Media gave positive reviews of all tracks (with the exception of "Oasis"), and stated that "The Point of it All" "emphasizes [her] strengths as a lyricist". MusicOMH reviewer Natasha Tripney described the album as "...exhilarating... It is a rather delicious confection; a cake iced with the darkest, bitterest chocolate", and ultimately gave the album 4 and half stars out of 5. However, Allmusic only gave the album 2 and half stars out of 5, stating that "[The album is] a disc full of songs that originally didn't make the cut on the band's main albums. Most of these best alternate song ideas were already used up when compiling the track listing for the fantastic Dresden Dolls B-sides compilation, No, Virginia... released earlier the same year. So, what we're looking at here are C-sides, which despite any amount of studio polish and however great the contributions by Folds, don't quite stack up."

== Song history ==
- "Ampersand" began appearing during Dresden Dolls concerts shortly after their album Yes, Virginia... was released.
- "The Point of It All" was performed numerous times during Palmer's solo sets during the Dresden Dolls' film festival project Fuck the Back Row, in 2007. She also performed "Night Reconnaissance" during these concerts, leading to fans expecting it as a solo Amanda Palmer track only. However, that song was eventually released on the Dolls collection No, Virginia...
- "Blake Says" has been shared online for many years; the version that has circulated is from a performance in Cambridge, Massachusetts, in 2004. It has been a staple in Palmer's solo shows and has been performed since at least 2001. It heavily references the Velvet Underground song "Stephanie Says", and is named after Boston artist Blake Brasher.
- "Straight", which was recorded during the sessions but not actually on the album, has also circulated under the working title "Hey Bitch".
- According to Palmer's Myspace, her set lists show that she had performed "Another Year", "Runs in the Family", "Guitar Hero", "Blake Says", "Ampersand", "Astronaut" and "Leeds United" during her 2007 summer concerts.
- "Have to Drive" has been performed sporadically during Dresden Dolls concerts, but not since 2005.
- Palmer stated during the Evelyn Evelyn tour that "Astronaut" was created in Portland, Oregon's very own Crystal Ballroom while traveling for the earlier Dresden Dolls tour to the same location. The earliest version of the song was finished on October 15, 2006, at the Crystal Ballroom.
- "Runs in the Family" was written during the same time period as "Girl Anachronism" and was performed as a Dresden Dolls song before being vetoed for the band.
- The earliest version of "Guitar Hero" was finished in late 2006.
- The melody for "Another Year" was given to Palmer by Cormac Bride in 2005 as noted by Palmer on July 20, 2005, at a Boston performance.

== Track listing ==
On June 6, 2008, in a preview for an interview with e-zine TheMagazine, Palmer gave the track list for the album, stating that advance copies of the album had been sent out to reviewers in Europe.

A live version of the song "I Google You" (co-written with Neil Gaiman) was available with the pre-order of the album.

Who Killed Amanda Palmer
No.	Title	Length
1.	"Astronaut: A Short History of Nearly Nothing" (ft. Zoë Keating and Ben Folds)	4:37
2.	"Runs in the Family" (ft. Ben Folds)	2:59
3.	"Ampersand" (strings arranged by Paul Buckmaster)	5:59
4.	"Leeds United" (ft. the Born Again Horny Men of Edinburgh)	4:55
5.	"Blake Says" (ft. Zoë Keating and Ben Folds)	4:43
6.	"Strength Through Music" (ft. Strindberg and Ben Folds)	3:29
7.	"Guitar Hero" (ft. East Bay Ray and Ben Folds)	4:48
8.	"Have to Drive" (ft. the Via Interficere Choir of Nashville and Jack Palmer, strings arranged by Paul Buckmaster)	5:50
9.	"What's the Use of Wond'rin?" (ft. St. Vincent; from Rodgers and Hammerstein's Carousel)	2:50
10.	"Oasis" (ft. Ben Folds and Jared Reynolds)	2:57
11.	"The Point of It All" (strings arranged by Paul Buckmaster)	5:35
12.	"Another Year: A Short History of Almost Something" (strings arranged by Paul Buckmaster)	6:03
13.	"Straight" (Amazon MP3/iTunes Exclusive)	5:13
14.	"Leeds United" (Lounge Version; Amazon MP3/iTunes Exclusive)	4:33
15.	"Guitar Hero" (alternate version; Amazon MP3/iTunes exclusive)	5:22

Three months after the album release in December 2008, an alternative version was released as an online only album. This version included single-take alternate recordings of songs from the album along with some tracks not on the original album.

Who Killed Amanda Palmer alternate tracks
No.	Title	Length
1.	"1.1.94"	4:37
2.	"The Point of It All"	5:33
3.	"Night Reconnaissance"	4:19
4.	"Runs in the Family"	4:06
5.	"Blake Says"	4:55
6.	"Strength Through Music"	2:37
7.	"Guitar Hero"	5:21
8.	"Boyfriend In a Coma"	2:56
9.	"Oasis"	2:14
10.	"You May Kiss the Bride"	4:00
11.	"I Will Follow You Into the Dark"	4:58
12.	"Ampersand"	5:59
13.	"Straight" (with Strings)	5:15
14.	"Astronaut"	4:40
15.	"Have to Drive"	5:16

== Chart history ==
Chart (2008)	Peak position
U.S. Billboard 200	77
U.S. Top Album Sales	77
U.S. Alternative Albums	3

As of 2012, Who Killed Amanda Palmer has sold 38,000 copies according to Nielsen SoundScan.

== Release history ==
Region	Date	Label	Format	Catalog
Online pre-order	September 8, 2008		Digital download	
Australia	September 13, 2008	Roadrunner Records	CD	RR 7925-5
United Kingdom	September 15, 2008	Roadrunner Records	CD	RR79255
USA	September 16, 2008	Roadrunner Records	CD	179252
Canada	September 16, 2008	Roadrunner Records	CD	
Germany	September 26, 2008	Roadrunner Records	CD	
USA	October 7, 2008		Vinyl	179251

== Personnel ==
- Amanda Palmer – vocals, piano, producer, Wurlitzer organ, Wurlitzer electric piano, celesta, vibraphone, handclaps
- Ben Folds – producer, drums, synthesizers, percussion, piano, BlackBerry, Wurlitzer organ, backing vocals
- Zoë Keating – cello (1, 5)
- East Bay Ray – guitar (7)
- Annie Clark – vocals, virtual chimes (9)
- Paul Buckmaster – arranger (3, 8, 12)
- David Davidson – violin (1, 2, 5)
- John Catchings – cello (2)
- Allan Ferguson – bass (4)
- Jamie Graham – drums (4)
- Josh Coppersmith-Heaven – saxophone (4)
- Tim Lane – trombone (4)
- Andy Moore – trumpet (4)
- Sam Bass – cello (7)
- Jared Reynolds – bass (10), back-up vocals (10)
- Carey Kotsionis, Carmella Ramsey, Donald Schroader, George Daeger, Jack Palmer, Jared Reynolds, Kate York, Leigh Nash, Sam Smith – choir vocals (8)
- Tim Smolens – additional recording (1)
- Joe Costa – engineer (2, 5, 6, 7, 10), mixer (1, 2, 4, 6, 10)
- Justin Phelps – engineer (3, 7, 8, 11, 12)
- Stephen Watkins – engineer (4)
- Jason Lehning – additional recording (4)
- Leslie Richter – engineer (5)
- Laura Dean – engineer (7, 8), handclaps (8)
- Henry Hirsch – engineer (9)
- Bram Tobey – assistant engineer (9)
- Alan Bezozi – producer (9)
- The strings
  - Paul Buckmaster: arranger/conductor
  - Suzie Katayama: orchestra manager/supervising copyist
  - Dwight Mikkelsen: supervising copyist
  - Kirby Furlong: copyist
  - Victor Sagerquist: copyist
  - Caryn Rasmussen: copyist
  - violins: Natalie Leggett, Ruth Bruegger, Darius Campo, Roberto Cano, Mario de Leon, Sarah Parkins, Joel Derouin, Michele Richards, Josefina Vergara
  - viola: Shanty Randall, Matt Funes, Evan Wilson
  - cello: Larry Corbett, Steve Richards, Daniel Smith
