= Destroy the Robots =

EP by The Red Paintings
- Released: 6 May 2006
- Recorded: 2006
- Studio: Modern Music Studios, Brisbane, Australia
- Genre: Experimental; alternative rock; orchestral; art rock
- Length: 23:48
- Label: Modern Music/Sony BMG
- Producer: Eric Chan; Trash McSweeney

The Red Paintings chronology
Walls (2005)	Destroy the Robots (2006)	Feed the Wolf (2007)

Destroy the Robots is the sixth release and fifth extended play (EP) by the Brisbane-based Australian art rock band the Red Paintings. It appeared on 6 May 2006 via Modern Music, and was engineered by Stuart Niven, mixed by David Leonard, and mastered by Matthew Grey. The album achieved some commercial success in Australia and received mixed reaction by music critics. The EP made its debut at No. 86 on the ARIA singles chart – their first charting release. It also debuted on the Air Chart at No. 3.

== Reception ==
Professional ratings
Review scores
Source	Rating
The Canberra Review	(Negative)
Eleven Magazine	3/5 stars
Mess & Noise Magazine	(Positive)

Eleven Magazine's reviewer observed, "One moment their sound is so completely angelic, as though an ethereal being not of this planet hand picked them for their innocence of song and string. Then, faster than a blinking eye, innocence turns to all knowing. All knowing turns to uneasiness and you’re hooked. There’s no escape." Emma Gibson of The Canberra Review felt, "something is missing from this recording. It's an unremarkable CD from a remarkable band, which makes it even more disappointing... I didn't hate it, but I won't urge you to buy this CD. Better you go see The Red Paintings live, because this release just doesn't quite do justice to these innovative performers."

== Track listing ==
1. "Destroy the Robots" – 3:41
2. "Pickles" – 3:50
3. "It Is as It Was" – 5:08
4. "I'll Sell You Suicide" – 3:07
5. "Futureless" – 2:46
6. "Destroy the Humans" – 5:16

== Personnel ==
Credits:

- Trash McSweeney – guitar, vocals, sequencing, sampling
- Ellen Stancombe – violin, tin whistle, backing vocals
- Wayne Jennings – cello, backing vocals
- Amanda Holmes – bass guitar
- Andy Davis – drums
- Shenzo Gregorio – mandolin

== Charts ==
Chart performance for Destroy the Robots
Chart (2006)	Peak position
Australia (ARIA)	86
