= Amanda Palmer Performs the Popular Hits of Radiohead on Her Magical Ukulele =

EP by Amanda Palmer
- Released: July 20, 2010
- Recorded: Adelaide, Australia, Sydney, Australia, Berlin, Germany, and Prague, Czech Republic
- Genre: Alternative rock; acoustic
- Length: 32:40
- Producer: Amanda Palmer, Mick Wordley

Amanda Palmer chronology
Who Killed Amanda Palmer (2008)	Amanda Palmer Performs the Popular Hits of Radiohead on Her Magical Ukulele (2010)	Amanda Palmer Goes Down Under (2011)

Singles from Amanda Palmer Performs the Popular Hits of Radiohead on Her Magical Ukulele
- 1. "Idioteque" Released: June 10, 2010; 2. "No Surprises" Released: July 19, 2011

Amanda Palmer Performs the Popular Hits of Radiohead on Her Magical Ukulele is an EP by the American songwriter Amanda Palmer, released on July 20, 2010. It comprises cover versions of songs by the band Radiohead, performed by Palmer on the ukulele.

== Reception ==
Paste Magazine listed "Fake Plastic Trees", from this album, as one of their 20 best covers of the year. Palmer's cover of "Idioteque" was National Public Radio's Song of the Day for January 11, 2011.

== Track listing ==
No.	Title	Length
1.	"Fake Plastic Trees"	5:22
2.	"High and Dry"	4:10
3.	"No Surprises"	3:45
4.	"Idioteque"	4:08
5.	"Creep" (Hungover at soundcheck in Berlin)	4:42
6.	"Exit Music (For a Film)"	5:19
7.	"Creep" (Live in Prague; Digital only bonus track)	5:17

== Personnel ==
- Amanda Palmer – vocals, piano, ukulele
- Lyndon Chester – violin on "Exit Music (For a Film)"
- Zoë Keating – cello on "Exit Music (For a Film)"
