= The Red Paintings =

Australian art rock band

- Origin: Geelong, Victoria, Australia
- Genres: Art rock; orchestral rock; experimental rock
- Labels: Independent; Modern/Sony BMG
- Past members: Trash McSweeney; Josh Engelking; Wayne Jennings; Ellen Stancombe; Amanda Holmes; Andy Davis; David Sue Yek

The Red Paintings were an Australian collaborative art rock band originally formed in Geelong, Victoria. The group was founded by Trash McSweeney, who provided lead vocals, guitar, sequencing and sampling. He was joined by various collaborators.

The band was known for their themed performances incorporating elements of theatre and art, often self-described as "orchestral sci-fi art rock". Band members often dressed in elaborate costumes and employed stage props, theatrical elements, and visual projections during their shows. The band often invited members of the audience to paint during live performances.

== History ==
=== Formation and early releases ===
Founding mainstay vocalist and songwriter, Trash McSweeney formed the Red Paintings in Geelong in 1998 with Alisha Fountain on bass guitar, Nathan Hewitt on synthesiser and sampling, Luke Rossiello on synthesiser and Phil Smythwaite on violin. He later provided varying descriptions of why he named the band, including "I experienced a seizure at a friend's house... I saw things that really affected me, actual visuals in my head." He claimed he had synaesthesia. According to McSweeney, in 2006, Hitler was a "personal catalyst" and his band were a "bowl of Fruit Loops" and he was abducted by aliens, when younger. The Sydney Morning Herald's Paris Pompor described his claims as "fanciful ideas".

The group were briefly based in Melbourne before relocating to Brisbane. McSweeney explained why he left Melbourne, "A lot of people want to have a standard format band – get up there, play rock'n'roll, look good, have chicks fall over them, take cocaine..." but "For me, it was never about that." In Brisbane, he was joined by an entirely new line-up, Leigh Doolan on drums, Jasmine Ebeling on bass guitar, and Ellen Stancombe on violin, tin whistle, and vocals. This lineup released the EP Cinema Love on Asphalt Records. From October to December 2003 the group undertook their Just People and Leaves tour of Australia. They released a single, "I'll Sell You Suicide", which was entered for Triple J's Unearthed competition to represent Brisbane in 2004. The Red Paintings performed at 2004's Valley Fiesta. Their new line-up consisted of McSweeney and Stancombe joined by Josh Engelking on percussion and Wayne Jennings on cello.

The Red Paintings signed with the Brisbane-based label Modern Music, with distribution by Sony BMG, in early 2005. The title track from the Walls EP entered Triple J's Net 50 chart at no. 3 and charted for fifteen weeks. That year, they toured China and Hong Kong. Their next EP was Destroy the Robots, released in May 2006. It achieved some commercial success in Australia but with mixed reviews from music critics. The EP reached no. 86 on the ARIA singles chart.

In September 2006 the group supported an Australian tour by American band Dresden Dolls. Jade Pham of Rave Magazine described one of their shows: "art-rock weirdos the Red Paintings seem comparatively normal in this line-up; dressed in warped Geisha style while two painters either side of stage use people as canvas, and frontman [McSweeney] shoots the crowd with toy laser guns." The Red Paintings then supported Dresden Dolls on an American tour. The tour was documented in the live, video album, Seizure & Synethesia, released on DVD in 2007. Also in 2007, the Australian band released another EP, Feed the Wolf . Obscured Sound's writer determined, "Like a Frans Hals painting, the result is epic and highly interpretable, revealing human emotions to the most authentic of perceptions contained in turbulent themes of religion, morality, and romanticism." During June–July 2007 the band undertook their Animal Rebellion Tour to promote the EP.

=== The Revolution Is Never Coming ===
According to the band's website and their then-label, Asphalt Records, in 2003 they were "currently working on their new 14 track album", The Revolution Is Never Coming. In June 2007, the Red Paintings announced plans for a full-length album and requested fan donations, raising A$40,000 by March of the following year. They issued a single from the album, "We Belong in the Sea" (March 2008). The band moved to Los Angeles in 2012, and toured as the opening act on two tours by Mindless Self Indulgence. In 2013 they supported a tour by ...And You Will Know Us by the Trail of Dead The full-length album The Revolution Is Never Coming was released in 2013. The album received mixed reviews, with Gert Bruins of Background Magazine calling it "... much too ambitious. Some moments are difficult to stomach. It's only when they pull on the breaks sometimes, that the band's musicality becomes clear."

The Red Paintings relocated to the United Kingdom in 2014 and served as the support act on a tour by Gary Numan. In 2017 they released the single, "Deleted Romantic".

== Members ==
- Trash McSweeney – lead vocals, guitar, sequencing, sampling
- Josh Engelking – percussion
- Wayne Jennings – cello
- Jasmine Ebeling – Bass
- Ellen Stancombe – violin
- Amanda Holmes – bass guitar
- Andy Davis – drums
- David Sue Yek – cello
- Leigh Doolan – drums

== Discography ==
=== Albums ===
- The Virgin Mary Australian Tour Acoustic/Strings Album (2005)
- Seizure & Synesthesia (video album, 2007)
- The Revolution Is Never Coming (2013)

=== Extended plays ===
- Angel Flummox (1999)
- Reality (Ahead of Schedule) (2000)
- Cinema Love (January 2002)
- Rain (July 2004) – MGM Distribution (MGM 8067824567)
- Walls (23 May 2005) – Modern Music/Sony BMG (SMA MM0024)
- Destroy the Robots (2006)
- Feed the Wolf (2007) – Vitamin Records
