= Coin-Operated Boy =

Single by The Dresden Dolls

from the album The Dresden Dolls
- Released: December 13, 2004
- Genre: Dark cabaret
- Length: 4:46
- Label: Roadrunner
- Songwriter: Amanda Palmer

The Dresden Dolls singles chronology
"Girl Anachronism" (2003)	"Coin-Operated Boy" (2004)	"Sing" (2006)

Music video
- "Coin-Operated Boy" on YouTube

"Coin-Operated Boy" is a single by The Dresden Dolls duo, taken from the self-titled debut album The Dresden Dolls. It was produced by Martin Bisi and released on December 13, 2004, by Roadrunner Records. "Coin-Operated Boy" was written by Amanda Palmer. The song makes heavy use of staccato, and includes instruments such as a toy piano.

== Interpretation ==
Palmer expounds on the many advantages of an artificial and subhuman partner, over real ones, in a tick-tock rhythm reminiscent of automata or clockwork. The song has broad overtones of lonely narcissism, and a desire for intimate loyalty and affection without personal sacrifice or vulnerability. Caroline Bologna of The Huffington Post writes that the song "suggests themes of masturbation as it explores the idea of the pleasure of love without the 'complications' of a real partner".

== Legacy ==
=== Reception ===
In Australia, the song was ranked #12 on Triple J's Hottest 100 of 2004.

=== In popular culture ===
It has been parodied and used in advertisements and products. The song was featured in the third episode of the DC Studios animated series Creature Commandos, titled "Cheers to the Tin Man".

== Track listing ==
German CD single

1. "Coin-Operated Boy" - 3:33
2. "Coin-Operated Boy" (Live) - 5:44 (This is the same version as the one found on A Is for Accident.)
3. "Baby One More Time" (Live) - 3:20

It is in The Dresden Dolls Companion.

== Personnel ==
- Amanda Palmer - piano, vocals, lyricist, composer, songwriter
- Brian Viglione - drums, guitar
- Martin Bisi - Memory Man
- Michael Pope - music video director
