= A Is for Accident =

Live album by The Dresden Dolls
- Released: May 27, 2003 (Important Records pressing); Oct. 20, 2009 (Bandcamp.com download)
- Recorded: 2001–2003
- Genre: Dark cabaret
- Length: 58:21
- Label: Important

The Dresden Dolls chronology
The Dresden Dolls (2001)	A Is for Accident (2003)	The Dresden Dolls (2003)

Professional ratings
Review scores
Source	Rating
Pitchfork	(8.4/10)

A Is for Accident is the debut live album by American dark cabaret duo The Dresden Dolls, a collection of live and studio recordings from 2001 to 2003, which was released on May 27, 2003, by Important Records. Future pressings were handled by 8 ft. Records and didn't include the bootleg recording of the band covering "Stand by Your Man" by Tammy Wynette. On October 20, 2009, the band released the album at Bandcamp.com, with two unlisted bonus tracks available to those who purchase the entire album (the digital download version, in a variety of formats, is free as of 2012).

Most of the tracks were recorded at live shows around the Boston area: T.T. The Bear's Place, the Lizard Lounge, and Sanders Theater in Cambridge, MA; WMBR 88.1 FM at MIT in Cambridge; WBRS 100.1 FM at Brandeis University in Waltham, MA; and the Milky Way in Boston's Jamaica Plain neighborhood. Several of them have local references: Christopher Lydon is a well-known radio interviewer at WBUR in Boston; "Bank of Boston Beauty Queen" takes place in Lexington, MA; "Truce" mentions a number of streets and places in Boston.

Amanda Palmer stated at their 31 October 2010 reunion show that the band owns the rights to this album and receives all proceeds from its distribution.

== Reception ==
Upon release, the album received generally positive reviews from critics.

== Track listing ==
No.	Title	Length
1.	"Missed Me" (live demo)	4:49
2.	"Coin-Operated Boy (Live at TT's)"	5:47
3.	"The Time Has Come (Live at the Milky Way)"	2:45
4.	"Mrs. O (Live at Luxx)"	4:35
5.	"Christopher Lydon (Live at Sanders Theater)"	5:28
6.	"Glass Slipper (Live at TT's)"	7:39
7.	"Thirty Whacks (Live on WBRS)"	4:54
8.	"Bank of Boston Beauty Queen (Live on WMBR)"	5:46
9.	"Will" (album outtake – B.C. Studio)	5:09
10.	"Truce" (live demo)	8:03

Bandcamp bonus tracks
No.	Title	Length
11.	"Stand by Your Man (Live at the Lizard Lounge)"	3:22
12.	"A Night at the Roses" (from the "Good Day" 7" single)	4:54

== Personnel ==
- Amanda Palmer – piano, vocals, lyricist, composer, songwriter
- Brian Viglione – drums, guitar
- Meredith Yayanos – violin on "Will"
- Greg Disterhost – guitar on "Stand By Your Man"
- Jim Smith – bass guitar on "Stand By Your Man"
