= Jeremy Geidt =

Actor and acting teacher (1930–2013)

- Born: Charles Jeremy Wollaston Geidt; 25 February 1930; London, England
- Died: 6 August 2013 (aged 83); Cambridge, Massachusetts, U.S.
- Education: Old Vic Theatre School
- Occupations: Actor and acting coach
- Known for: Founding member of the American Repertory Theater & the Yale Repertory Theatre

Charles Jeremy Wollaston Geidt (25 February 1930 – 6 August 2013) was a British-born American stage actor, comedian and acting coach. He was a Professor of Acting at Yale University, and later at Harvard University, being a founding member of both the American Repertory Theater and the Yale Repertory Theatre.

== Biography ==
Jeremy Geidt was born in London in 1930, to financier Frederick Bernard Geidt, MC (1892-1955) and (Caroline) Audrey Willmer (1897-1992), daughter of Charles P. White, MVO, a physician to the Royal Family. His first cousin, Mervyn Bernard Geidt (1926-1991), was father of Christopher Geidt, Baron Geidt, private secretary to Elizabeth II from 2007 to 2017.

Diagnosed as dyslexic in his youth, he left Wellington College at the age of 16. He auditioned and was accepted into the Old Vic Theatre School, where he would later teach under Michel Saint-Denis. He married, had a daughter with actress Patricia Kneale, and divorced. Around 1961, after appearing in stage and television productions, he began to tour with the satirical ensemble "The Establishment", comprising Geidt, Eleanor Bron, John Bird and John Fortune. The group toured in the U.S., where he met his second wife Jan Graham in Washington, D.C.

Geidt stayed in the States, becoming a founding member of the Yale Repertory Theatre in 1966. He became a professor of acting at Yale University's School of Drama. He went on to become a founding member of the American Repertory Theater and an acting instructor at its Institute for Advanced Theater Training. He was also taught acting at Harvard University in 1998. Of his students in his 2000 American Repertory Theater acting workshop, Geidt stated, "I'm hoping they come away with their imaginations touched, enlarged and having experienced something that is, hopefully, joyful...with something they found within themselves — or in the text — that they didn't know they had."

Around 2000, Geidt was diagnosed with cancer. However, he refused to stop performing. On 6 August 2013, he suffered a heart attack and died at his home in Cambridge, Massachusetts. He was 83 years old and is survived by his wife Jan, their two daughters, and his daughter by Kneale.

== Acting career ==
=== Film and television ===
Although Geidt preferred a life on the stage, he appeared in minor roles in several television series, films, and videos including:

- The Old & The New (2009), co-starring his wife, Jan.
- Next Stop Wonderland (1998)
- The Spanish Prisoner (1997)
- Private Potter (1962)
- So Little Time (1952)

=== Partial stage work ===
==== With the American Repertory Theater ====
Sources:

- Cabaret as Max (2010)
- The Seagull as Sorin (2009)
- Julius Caesar as Cicero (2008)
- The Onion Cellar (2007)
- Three Sisters as Ferapont (2006)
- A Midsummer Night's Dream as Quince/Snug (2004)
- Loot as Truscott (2000)
- Ivanov as Lebedev (2000)
- Man and Superman as Mendoza/Devil (1997)
- Buried Child as Dodge (1996)
- The Threepenny Opera as Peachum/Petey (1995)
- Major Barbara as Undershaft
- Heartbreak House as Shotover
- Henry IV as Falstaff
- Twelfth Night as Toby Belch
- The Caretaker as Davies
- The Homecoming as Max
- Waiting for Godot as Vladimir
- The Cherry Orchard as Gaev

=== Awards ===
- Elliot Norton Award for Outstanding Actor (1992)
- Elliot Norton Award in memory (2014)
