= The Art of Asking =

2014 memoir by Amanda Palmer

The Art of Asking: How I Learned to Stop Worrying and Let People Help
- Author: Amanda Palmer foreword by Brené Brown
- Audio read by: Amanda Palmer with the songs performed.
- Language: English
- Genre: Biography
- Published: 2014, Grand Central Publishing
- Publication place: United States
- Media type: Print, e-book, audiobook
- Pages: 352 pages
- ISBN: 978-1-4555-8108-5

The Art of Asking: How I Learned to Stop Worrying and Let People Help is a 2014 memoir by American musician Amanda Palmer with a foreword by Brené Brown. It covers Palmer's early days as a performer through to her musical career then. Palmer wrote the book over a four-month period during early 2014, after performing at the Sydney Festival. The hardcover was published by Grand Central Publishing on 11 November 2014 and then on October 20, 2015 as a paperback ISBN 978-1-4555-8109-2.

== Synopsis ==
In the book Palmer details her early life as a performer and further expands on topics covered in her speech at the TED talks.

== Reception ==
Critical reception for The Art of Asking has been mixed. Flavorwire commented that while they were "pleasantly surprised by the value within The Art of Asking" and that the book "has passion behind it", it was "not necessarily a fertile and comprehensive vision for the average reader". NPR was slightly more critical as they felt that while the book was "well-intentioned", that "in thinking about the art of asking, Palmer misses its most basic tenet: In our society, certain kinds of people are allowed to ask for things, and certain kinds of people are not. She writes as though the biggest obstacle to getting the help you need is a reluctance to ask — not, say, ingrained social structures having to do with race and class". The Boston Globe was also mixed in their opinion, stating that while the book had some compelling and touching elements it was also "a study in contradictions, which makes for frustrating reading".

The book made The New York Times bestsellers lists.

== Audiobook ==
Palmer recorded the book as an audiobook ISBN 978-1-4789-8288-3, with performances of the songs. There is also an Audible edition.
