= The Dresden Dolls =

American musical duo (formed 2000)

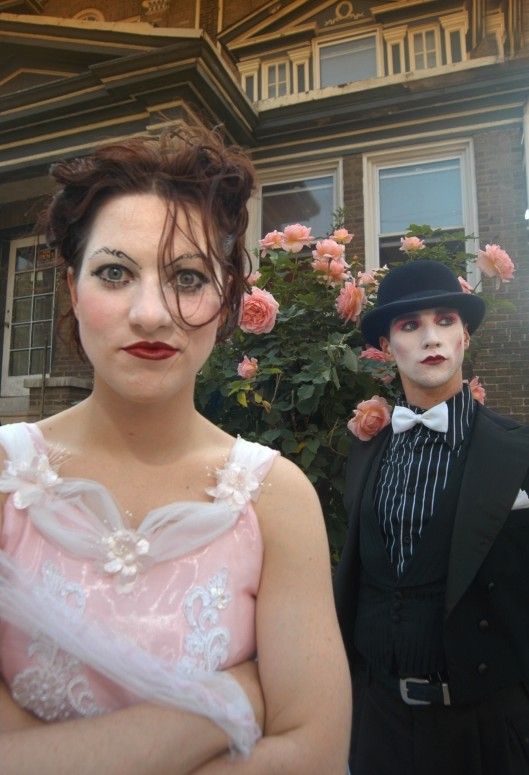
- Amanda Palmer (left) and Brian Viglione (right) in 2002

Background information
- Also known as: Out of Arms
- Origin: Boston, Massachusetts, US
- Genres: Dark cabaret
- Years active: 2000–2008, 2010–2012, 2015, 2018, 2022–present
- Label: Roadrunner
- Members: Amanda Palmer; Brian Viglione
- Website: dresdendolls.com

The Dresden Dolls is an American musical duo from Boston, Massachusetts. Formed in 2000, the group consists of Amanda Palmer (lead vocals and piano; additional: keyboards, harmonica, ukulele) and Brian Viglione (drums and backing vocals; additional: guitar, bass guitar). The two describe their style as "Brechtian punk cabaret", a phrase invented by Palmer because she was "terrified" that the press would invent a name that "would involve the word gothic". The Dresden Dolls aesthetic exemplifies dark cabaret.

== Career ==
=== Band formation and name ===
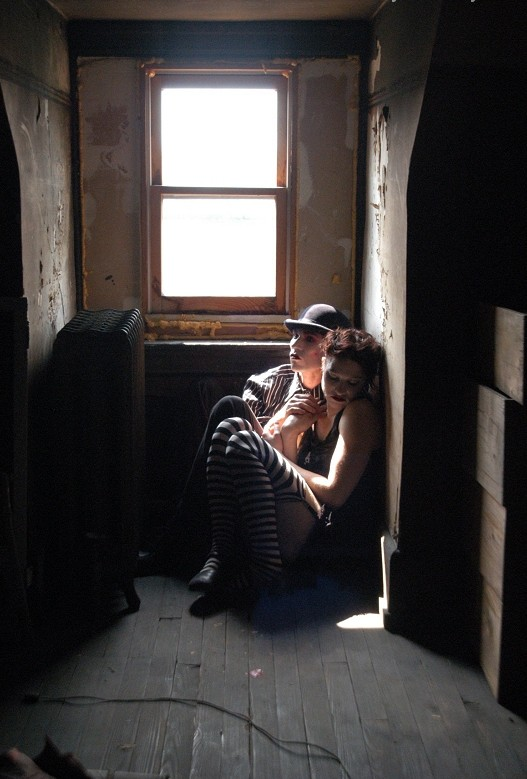
The Dresden Dolls, 2002 Photo by Kyle Cassidy

The duo formed a week after Brian Viglione witnessed Amanda Palmer perform solo at a Halloween party in 2000. Their live performances soon gained them a cult following. During these performances the two band members often wore dramatic make-up and fancy clothing that pushed their cabaret/theater aesthetic. They encourage fans to become involved at their shows, with the fans' own stilt walking, living statues, fire breathers, busking, and other performance art becoming an integral part of the show. The Dirty Business Brigade coordinated the fans' performances.

The band's first name was Out of Arms. At some point, the name became The Dresden Dolls. The name, according to Palmer, was "inspired by a combination of things", including the firebombing of Dresden, Germany, and the porcelain dolls that were a hallmark of pre-war Dresden industry; an early song of the same name by The Fall; and a reference to the V. C. Andrews novel Flowers in the Attic, where the classically blond-haired and blue-eyed protagonists are called "the Dresden dolls". The name also evokes Weimar Germany and its cabaret culture. Additionally, Palmer "liked the parallel between Dresden (destruction) and Dolls (innocence, delicacy), because it is very much in keeping with the dynamics of the music, which sometimes goes from a childlike whisper to a banshee scream within a few seconds".

=== Growing fame and performances ===
The duo was featured in a webcast performance at the 2002 Ig Nobel Prize ceremony in Cambridge, Massachusetts. After a self-promoted demo recorded and released in 2001, their first release was the mostly live compilation A Is for Accident (Important Records), followed in 2003 by a self-titled debut produced and recorded by Martin Bisi (Swans, Sonic Youth) at The Old American Can Factory in Gowanus, Brooklyn after being signed to Roadrunner Records by David Bason. The album features fellow Boston-area musicians Ad Frank (guitar on "Good Day") and Shawn Setaro (bass on "Good Day", "Gravity", and "Jeep Song"). Two songs from the album ranked in the Triple J Hottest 100, 2004: "Girl Anachronism" at number 30 and "Coin-Operated Boy" at number 12. In 2003 they were crowned the winners of Boston's long-running WBCN Rock & Roll Rumble.

On October 6, 2005, The Dresden Dolls were interviewed by the subject of one of their songs, Christopher Lydon, on the radio show Open Source.

=== Tours, festivals, books, and theater ===
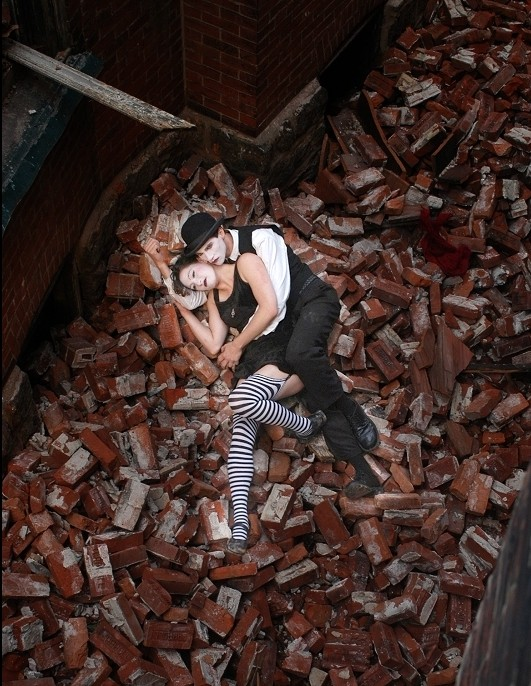
The Dresden Dolls, 2002

In March 2005, the duo supported Nine Inch Nails on tour. On June 5, The Dresden Dolls hosted a free concert at the Paradise Rock Club in Boston. When a power outage unexpectedly delayed their performance, city streets became a temporary stage for some of the many performers (living statues, stilt-walkers, and fire-breathers) who had come from across the world to entertain audiences. The entire event—concert and street performances—was filmed and the resulting DVD, Live: In Paradise, was released in Europe on October 10, 2005, and in North America on November 22, shortly after the band's fall 2005 tour.

The Dresden Dolls' second studio album, Yes, Virginia..., was released on April 18, 2006.

Over the summer of that year, the duo performed at South by Southwest, Bonnaroo, Britain's Reading and Leeds Festivals, and Lollapalooza, in addition to touring with Panic! at the Disco as their opening act. During the support tour, the band presented "Fuck the Back Row—A Night of Celluloid Vaudeville". The events consisted of screenings of short films from friends and fans, performances by local artists, and a solo show by Palmer who performed mostly cover songs inspired from film soundtracks.

In June 2006, The Dresden Dolls Companion was released by Amanda Palmer. The book contains a history of the band and their first album—The Dresden Dolls—as well as a partial autobiography. The book also contains the lyrics, sheet music, and notes on each song on the album, as well as a DVD featuring a 20-minute interview with Palmer about the origins of the band and the first LP. The interview was conducted by a friend while Palmer compiled the artwork for the first LP.

On August 16, 2006, the East Providence Community Theatre in East Providence, Rhode Island, premiered a full-length, fan-written jukebox musical, The Clockwork Waltz, featuring songs from The Dresden Dolls' three albums. The show was encouraged by the band and their management.

In December 2006 and January 2007, the music of The Dresden Dolls was featured in an original production—The Onion Cellar—at the American Repertory Theatre's Zero Arrow Theatre in Cambridge, Massachusetts. The play is co-authored by Amanda Palmer, from her original concept.

On November 3 and 4, 2006, The Dresden Dolls performed at London's recently restored Roundhouse venue. The shows and resulting DVD was released as Live at the Roundhouse video, featuring a large number of artistic performers, circus acts, gymnasts, and cabaret dancers, both as support acts and participating alongside the band during their set. The set draws from both of their studio albums, previously unreleased songs and covers. From December 27, 2007, to January 13, 2008, their Winter Tour started at the Sixth & I Historic Synagogue in Washington, D.C., and ending at The Norva in Norfolk, Virginia.

On January 14, 2007, the duo took a temporary hiatus. Palmer worked on her solo album, Who Killed Amanda Palmer, while Brian Viglione toured with Boston-based HUMANWINE and other local Boston acts, along with touring with Jesse Malin and offering drum clinics. In June 2007, they joined the True Colors Tour 2007, including their debut in New York City's Radio City Music Hall and their first review in The New York Times. On July 10, 2007, the DVD Live at the Roundhouse was released in the U.S.

On January 15, 2008, they entered the studio to record new material for their third studio album, No, Virginia... Released on May 20, 2008, it is a collection of B-sides and rarities, along with new recordings of old favorites and cover songs that were previously only available as live versions. The album spawned the single "Night Reconnaissance".

July 2008 saw the release of the second Dresden Dolls book, the Virginia Companion. It is a follow-up to the Dresden Dolls Companion, featuring the music and lyrics from the Yes, Virginia... and No, Virginia... albums.

=== Hiatus ===
In September 2008, rumors began to circulate about the future of the band. Viglione confirmed that the band was on hiatus but emphasized that he and Palmer are on good terms and that they will get together again when it felt right for both of them. In late July and early August 2009, a rumor began to spread that the band was "reuniting for performances in 2010" but Palmer clarified in her blog on August 7: "There's been a ton of press lately re-printing an old quote from an old interview that's now blown up into a full-fledged press rumour that Brian and I have planned Dresden Dolls' shows for 2010. Not true. We aren't planning any shows. Sorry about that, blame the gossip whores."

=== 2010s reunions ===
In 2010, a reunion tour to selected venues in the United States occurred. It started on Halloween in New York City and ended in San Francisco on New Year's Eve.

On December 9, 2011, The Dresden Dolls played a show in Mexico City. They had a tour of New Zealand and Australia in January 2012, supported by The Jane Austen Argument in Australia, and Hera, House of Mountain and Princess Chelsea in New Zealand.

On April 15, 2015, they had a show in New York to celebrate Record Store Day and promote the release of The Virginia Monologues.

In 2018, they played three nights at the Paradise Rock Club, as part of the Club's 40th anniversary celebration.

On October 27 (The Dome, Tufnell Park), 30 & 31 (The Troxy), 2018, they played three shows in London (their first shows in Europe in 12 years).

=== 2020s reunion ===
On her There Will Be No Intermission tour in 2019, Amanda Palmer announced that The Dresden Dolls would be recording and releasing a new album in 2020. This was later put on hold, however, due to the COVID-19 pandemic.

Viglione played drums on four tracks of a charity album released by Palmer in February 2020.

In a newsletter, they announced three shows in Woodstock, and that they "are working, slowly, on a new album and a new world tour." Palmer and Vigilone have been working on new songs in a rehearsal space near Palmer's Woodstock home.

In Fall 2022, The Dresden Dolls reunited for three shows in Woodstock, New York, and a New Years Eve show. They started writing songs for their new album and working the new songs into live sets.

In 2023, they toured in the US. In September 2023, they also performed at Riot Fest in Chicago.

In 2026, The Dresden Dolls announced a re-recording of their album, Yes, Virginia..., titled Yes, Virginia...(Tailor's Version). The title is in reference to the aftermath of the Taylor Swift masters dispute, in which Swift rerecorded many of her albums, with the added subtitle of "(Taylor's Version)". It released on August 7, 2026.

== Discography ==
Studio albums

- The Dresden Dolls (2003)
- Yes, Virginia... (2006)

== Musical style and influences ==
The Dresden Dolls are a dark cabaret band. Their piano- and drum-driven rock music, incorporated into alternative rock song structures with piano replacing the rhythm guitar, has seen them fall into the piano rock genre. Palmer named her influences as Cyndi Lauper, Laurie Anderson, Kate Bush, Bauhaus, The Cure, The Legendary Pink Dots, Robyn Hitchcock, Nick Cave, The Beatles, Violent Femmes, Yazoo, Soft Cell, The Thompson Twins, Depeche Mode, Neutral Milk Hotel, and Brian Eno.

== Awards and honors ==
- 2005: WFNX/Boston Phoenix Best Music Poll, Best Local Act and Best Local Album.

== Bibliography ==
- Palmer, Amanda (2006). The Dresden Dolls Companion. New York: Eight Foot Music. ISBN 978-1-57560-888-4.
- Palmer, Amanda; Viglione, Brian (2008). The Dresden Dolls: The Virginia Companion. New York: Cherry Lane Music Company. ISBN 978-1-60378-079-7. OCLC 232127008.

== See also ==
- The Art of Asking: How I Learned to Stop Worrying and Let People Help
- Black Tape for a Blue Girl
- Evelyn Evelyn
- List of dark cabaret artists
