= Amanda Palmer =

American musician and performance artist (born 1976)

- Palmer in 2019

Background information
- Also known as: Amanda Fucking Palmer; AFP
- Born: Amanda MacKinnon Palmer; April 30, 1976 (age 50); New York City, U.S.
- Origin: Boston, Massachusetts, U.S.
- Genres: Alternative rock; dark cabaret; folk
- Occupations: Singer-songwriter; musician; performance artist; author
- Instruments: Vocals; keyboards; ukulele; harmonica; drums
- Years active: 1999–present
- Labels: Roadrunner; Cooking Vinyl; 8ft. Records
- Spouse: Neil Gaiman (m. 2011; sep. 2022)
- Website: amandapalmer.net

Amanda MacKinnon Palmer (born April 30, 1976) is an American singer, songwriter, musician, and performance artist who is the lead vocalist, pianist, and lyricist of the duo the Dresden Dolls. She performs as a solo artist and was also a member of the duo Evelyn Evelyn and the lead singer and songwriter of Amanda Palmer and the Grand Theft Orchestra. She has gained a cult fanbase and was one of the first musical artists to popularize the use of crowdfunding websites.

== Early life and education ==
Amanda MacKinnon Palmer was born in New York City and grew up in Lexington, Massachusetts. Her father Jack Palmer was a physicist and her mother Katharine Mockett was a computer programmer. Her parents divorced when she was one year old, and as a child she rarely saw her father. Her maternal grandfather Alfred E. Mockett was on the board of directors of the Beneficial Corporation.

She attended Lexington High School, where she was active in the drama club, and later attended Wesleyan University where she studied theater and was a member of the Eclectic Society. In 1999, Palmer founded the Shadowbox Collective, a performance group devoted to street theatre and putting on theatrical shows (such as the 2002 play, Hotel Blanc, which she directed).

Palmer graduated from Wesleyan University in 1998 with a BA in German Studies, later dropping out of a graduate program at Heidelberg University. Palmer spent several years busking as a living statue called the Eight Foot Bride in Cambridge, Massachusetts, in Edinburgh, in Berlin, in Saint Petersburg, and in Adelaide, where she met her future collaborator Jason Webley. She refers to her street performance work in the Dresden Dolls song "The Perfect Fit", as well as on the A is for Accident track "Glass Slipper".

== Career ==
=== 2000–2007: The Dresden Dolls and The Onion Cellar ===
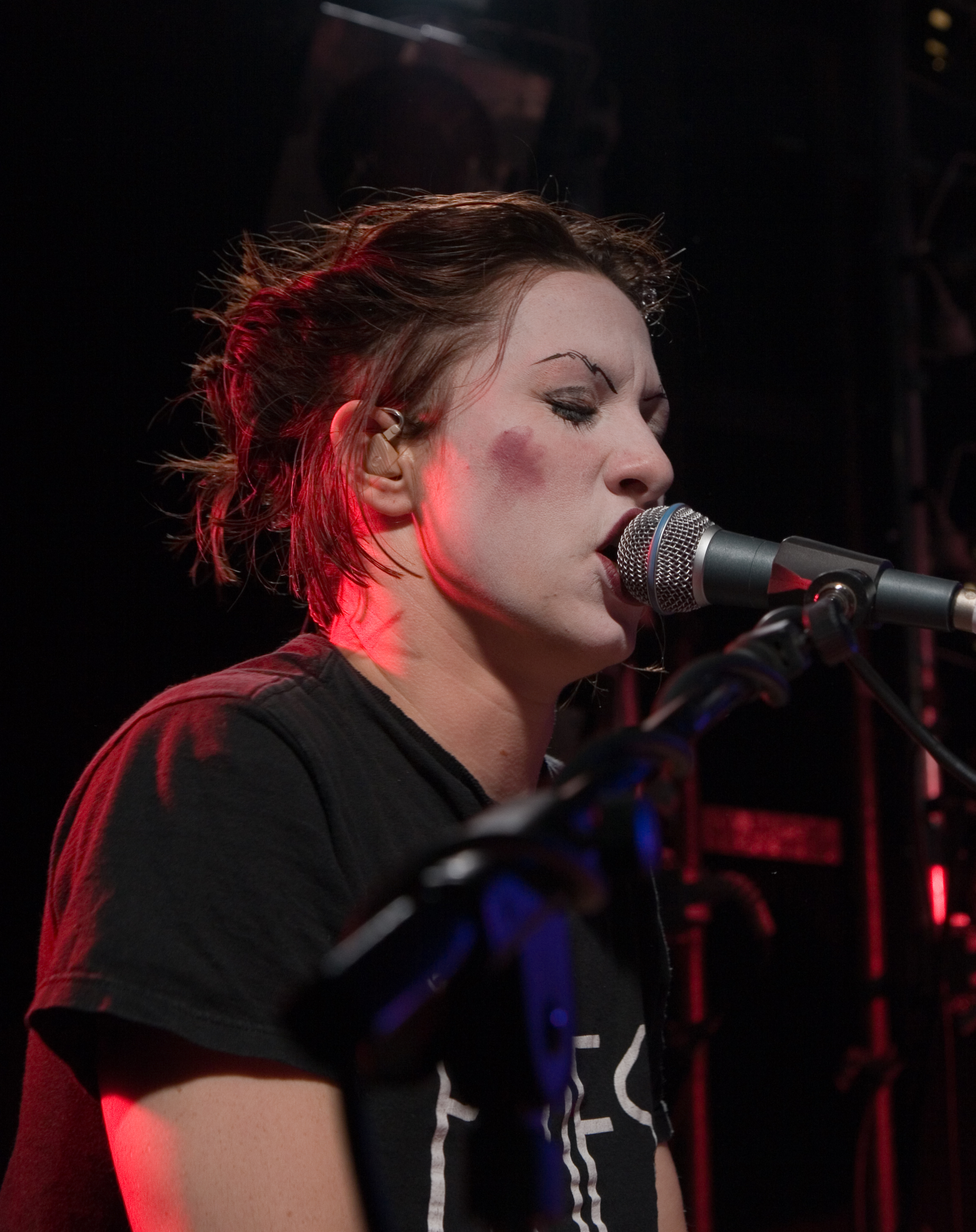
Palmer performing with the Dresden Dolls at Kings Arms Tavern in Auckland, New Zealand, September 2006

At a Halloween party in 2000, Palmer met drummer Brian Viglione and afterwards they formed the Dresden Dolls. In an effort to expand the performance experience and interactivity, Palmer began inviting Lexington High School students to perform drama pieces at the Dresden Dolls' live shows. This evolved to the Dirty Business Brigade, a troupe of seasoned and new artists, performing at many gigs.

In 2002, the band recorded their debut album, The Dresden Dolls, with producer Martin Bisi. They produced the album before signing with the label Roadrunner Records.

In 2006, The Dresden Dolls Companion was published, with words, music and artwork by Amanda Palmer. In it she has written a history of the album The Dresden Dolls and of the duo, as well as a partial autobiography. The book also contains the lyrics, sheet music, and notes on each song in the album, all written by Palmer, as well as a DVD with a 20-minute interview of Amanda about making the book.

Palmer conceived the musical/production The Onion Cellar, based on a short story from The Tin Drum by Günter Grass. From December 9, 2006, through January 13, 2007, the Dresden Dolls performed the piece in conjunction with the American Repertory Theater at the Zero Arrow Theatre in Cambridge, Massachusetts. While Palmer was openly frustrated with the direction of the show, fan and critical reviews were positive.

In June 2007, as part of the Dresden Dolls, she toured with the True Colors Tour 2007, including her debut in New York City's Radio City Music Hall, and her first review in The New York Times.

Though the Dresden Dolls broke up in 2008, Palmer and Viglione have continued to collaborate, and have had several minor reunions under the band name in 2011, 2012, 2016, 2017, and 2018. In 2022, the Dresden Dolls reunited, and started work on a new album. In 2023, they toured the US.

=== 2007–2010: Who Killed Amanda Palmer, Evelyn Evelyn, and theatrical work ===
In July 2007, Palmer played three sold-out shows (in Boston, Hoboken, and NYC) in a new "with band" format. Her backing band was Boston alternative rock group Aberdeen City, who also opened along with Dixie Dirt. In August 2007, Palmer traveled to perform in the Spiegeltent and other venues at the Edinburgh Festival Fringe in Scotland, and also performed on BBC Two's The Edinburgh Show. She collaborated with Australian theater company the Danger Ensemble; both again appeared at the Spiegeltent in Melbourne and at other venues around Australia in December 2007.

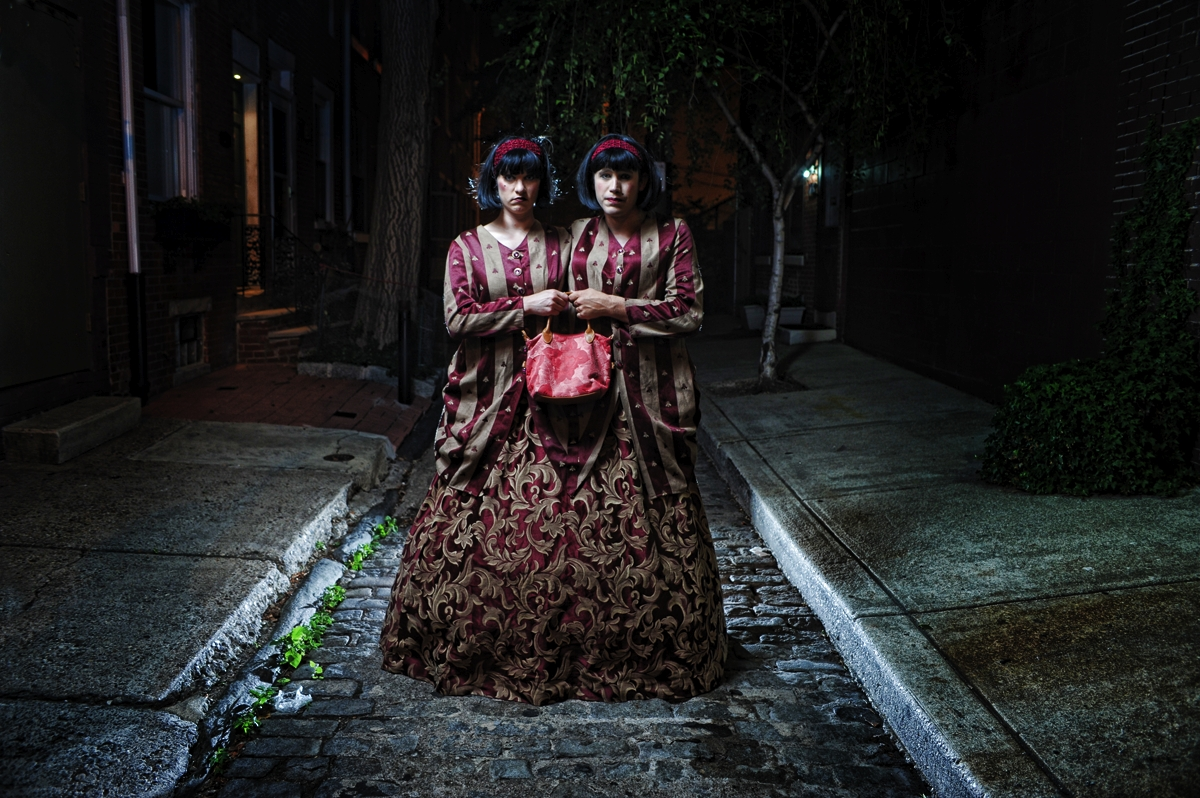
Palmer (left) as a member of Evelyn Evelyn, with Jason Webley

In September 2007, Palmer collaborated with Jason Webley to launch the new project Evelyn Evelyn with the EP Elephant Elephant. In the project, the duo play conjoined twin sisters named Eva and Lyn, and through their music tell their fictional backstory.

In July 2008, the Dresden Dolls released a second book, the Virginia Companion, a follow-up to The Dresden Dolls Companion, featuring the music and lyrics from the Yes, Virginia...(2006) and No, Virginia... (2008) albums, produced by Sean Slade and Paul Kolderie.

In June 2008, Palmer established her solo career with two well-received performances with the Boston Pops.

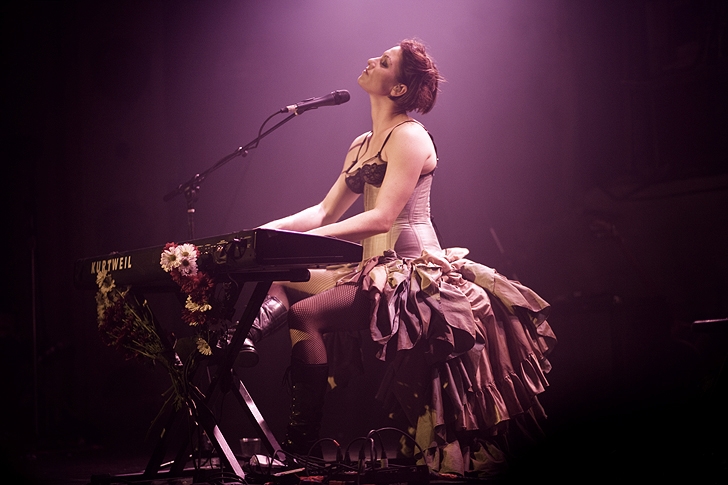
Palmer during her 2008 tour promoting Who Killed Amanda Palmer

Her first solo studio album, Who Killed Amanda Palmer, was released on September 16, 2008. Ben Folds produced and also played on the album. The title is a play on an expression used by fans during Twin Peaks' original run, "Who killed Laura Palmer?" A companion book of photos of Palmer looking as if she were murdered was released in July 2009. Titled Who Killed Amanda Palmer a Collection of Photographic Evidence, it featured photography by Kyle Cassidy and stories by Neil Gaiman, as well as lyrics from the album.

In late 2008, she toured Europe with Jason Webley, Zoë Keating and The Danger Ensemble, performing songs mostly from her debut solo album. She did most of the shows with a broken foot she had sustained in Belfast, Northern Ireland when a car ran over her foot as she stepped out into a street. In April 2009, she played at the Coachella Valley Music and Arts Festival.

In 2009, Palmer went back to her alma mater, Lexington High School in Massachusetts, to collaborate with her old director and mentor Steven Bogart on a workshop piece for the department's spring production. The play, With The Needle That Sings In Her Heart, was inspired by Neutral Milk Hotel's album In the Aeroplane Over the Sea and The Diary of Anne Frank. NPR's Avishay Artsy interviewed the cast on All Things Considered.

In 2010, Palmer returned to the A.R.T. for a two-month run of Cabaret, starring as the Emcee. The same year the Dresden Dolls reunited for a United States tour starting on Halloween in New York City and ending in San Francisco on New Year's Eve. On March 30, 2010, Palmer and Webley released their debut self-titled album as Evelyn Evelyn. This was accompanied by a worldwide tour and graphic novel based on the story of the sisters.

Palmer began using the ukulele during a concert as a goof, but soon it became a regular part of her repertoire. Later, she recorded a full album with ukulele accompaniment: Amanda Palmer Performs the Popular Hits of Radiohead on Her Magical Ukulele.

=== 2012–2014: Theatre Is Evil and The Art of Asking ===
On April 20, 2012, Palmer announced on her blog that she launched a new album pre-order on Kickstarter. The Kickstarter project was ultimately supported by 24,883 backers for a total of $1,192,793 — at the time, the most funds ever raised for a musical project on Kickstarter. A widely reported and commented upon controversy emerged from the related tour when Palmer blogged asking for "semi-professional" local musicians (fans who were already planning on attending various stops on the tour) to volunteer to play a couple of songs with her and her band, the Grand Theft Orchestra, during their live shows for "exposure, fun, beer and hugs" instead of money.

After outcry from various music unions and professional musicians, Palmer responded publicly and changed her policy to one of paying local musicians cash. The album, Theatre Is Evil, was recorded with the Grand Theft Orchestra, produced by John Congleton, and released in September 2012. On November 9, 2012, Palmer released the music video for "Do It with a Rockstar" on The Flaming Lips' website. The video was co-created and directed by Wayne Coyne, the singer of the Flaming Lips. Subsequent videos were released for "The Killing Type" and "The Bed Song".

On August 9, 2013, Palmer made her Lincoln Center debut. In November 2014, Palmer released a memoir, The Art of Asking, which expands on a TED talk she gave in February 2013. The book made the New York Times Best Seller list. The book also received several critical reviews, most notably from NPR.

=== 2015–2018: You Got Me Singing, I Can Spin a Rainbow, and Patreon ===
On March 3, 2015, Amanda began soliciting financial support on the crowdfunding platform Patreon. Palmer spoke at the 2015 Hay Festival about the prospect of reconciling art and motherhood. The talk was recorded for the BBC Radio 4 series Four Thought and broadcast on June 21, 2015. Also in 2015, she served as a judge for The 14th Annual Independent Music Awards. During the first months of 2016, she released the completely Patreon-funded song "Machete", and a David Bowie tribute EP, entitled Strung Out In Heaven: A Bowie String Quartet Tribute. Palmer collaborated with her father, Jack Palmer, to record an album entitled You Got Me Singing. They performed concerts in July 2016 in support of the album.

Amanda Palmer collaborated with Legendary Pink Dots frontman Edward Ka-Spel to record an album, I Can Spin a Rainbow. The duo toured in May and June 2017 in support of the album, backed by Legendary Pink Dots' former violin player Patrick Q. Wright.

=== 2019–present: There Will Be No Intermission and podcast ===
On March 8, 2019, Palmer released her third solo studio album and first in seven years, There Will Be No Intermission. The album was promoted by an extensive world tour that was filmed for her patrons on Patreon.

In fall 2020, Palmer launched a podcast called The Art of Asking Everything. On October 31, 2020, Palmer and Viglione performed "Science Fiction/Double Feature" to open the Wisconsin Democrats Livestream fundraiser that reunited some original Rocky Horror Picture Show cast members to act out the show with additional stars and singers.

== Personal life ==
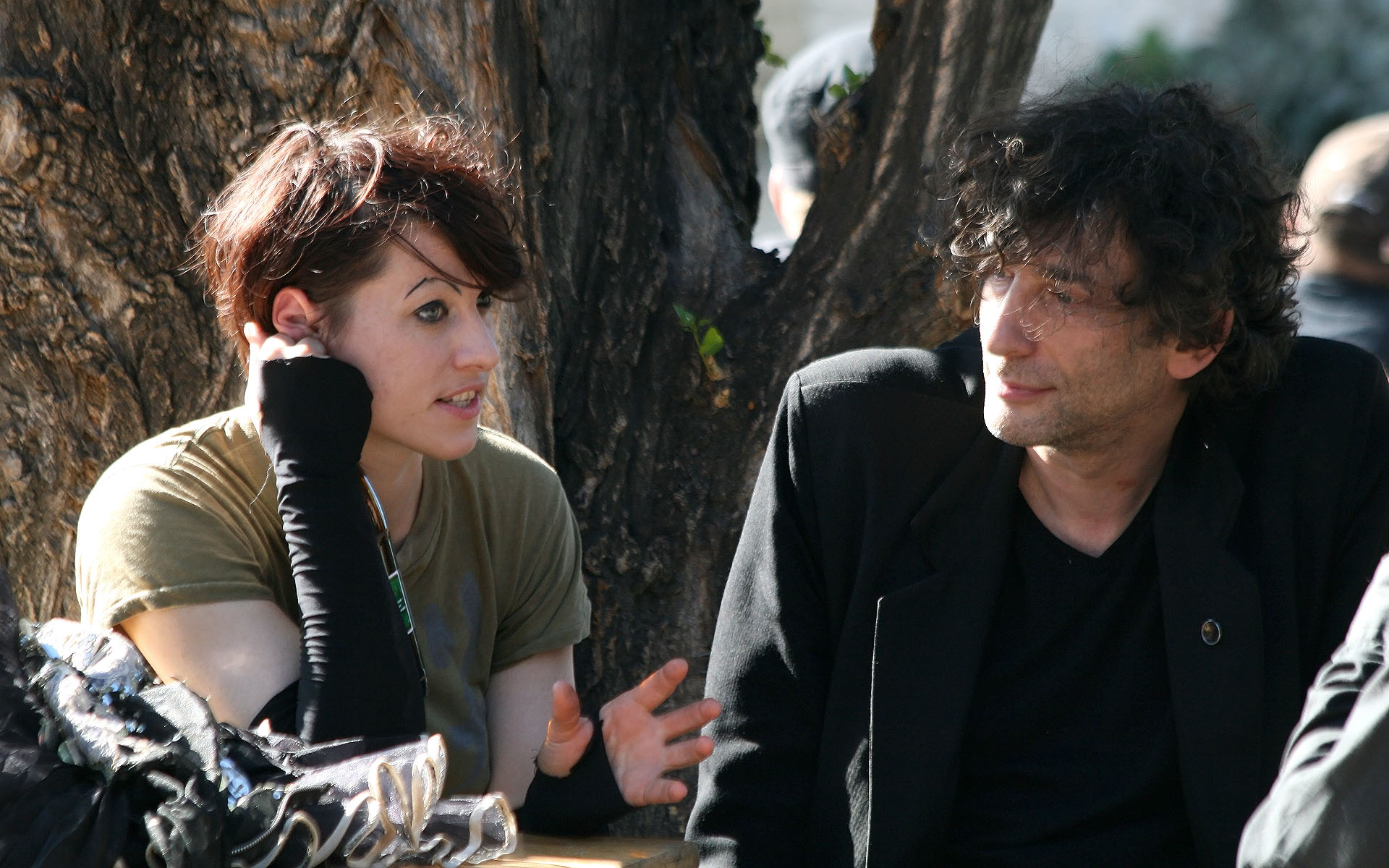
Amanda Palmer and Neil Gaiman (Vienna 2011)

For more than a decade, Palmer lived in an independent artists' cooperative named the Cloud Club in Boston, Massachusetts.

Palmer has practiced yoga and meditation. In 2008, she wrote an article titled "Melody vs. Meditation" for the Buddhist publication Shambhala Sun (now known as 'Lion's Roar'), which described the struggle between songwriting and being able to clear the mind to meditate.

Palmer has said that she is bisexual, telling afterellen.com in 2007: "I'm bisexual, but it's not the sort of thing I spent a lot of time thinking about." She has spoken about her open relationships, and has commented on feminist issues.

Palmer has said that she once worked as a stripper under the name Berlin. She wrote the song "Berlin" about this experience.

Palmer has had three abortions, and her song "Voicemail for Jill" is about these experiences.

Palmer, then 33, and the British author Neil Gaiman, then 49, confirmed their engagement in 2010. The couple married in a private ceremony in January 2011. The wedding took place in the parlor of the writers Ayelet Waldman and Michael Chabon. The two had an open marriage, and encouraged one another to date and engage in sexual relationships, including with fans of their work. Palmer and Gaiman have one child together, a son, born in 2015.

In November 2022, Palmer and Gaiman announced in a joint statement that they would divorce. In January 2025, it was reported that Palmer had moved in with her parents due to financial hardship caused by "ugly", ongoing divorce proceedings.

=== Allegations of human trafficking ===
In July 2024 reporter Rachel Johnson released a seven-part audio documentary that included Palmer's alleged role in ongoing litigation against Palmer's former husband, Neil Gaiman, for sexual abuse.

In January 2025, a Vulture article implicated Palmer as being complicit in the alleged sexual abuse by Gaiman of (according to The Guardian) at least nine women. When one, a former nanny, filed a police report in New Zealand, she said an officer told her that Palmer's cooperation was essential for the case; Palmer declined to speak with police. In February 2025, she was sued for alleged human trafficking, conspiracy to commit human trafficking, and negligence. The suit was filed as a U.S. multi-state filing to be tried in February 2026, due to difficulty in determining her current state of residency. Palmer denied the allegations made against her.

In March 2025, the Brooklyn concert venue National Sawdust cancelled her performance due to the allegations. In May 2025 at a concert in Somerville, Massachusetts, Palmer appeared dressed as a maid wearing a black dress and apron, played new songs she called "Songs from the Cancel Kitchen"; when asked during the question and answer session if she had been cancelled or "soft-cancelled", she stated that she felt "overwhelmed" by watching the "court of public opinion tear me apart".

By February 2026, the U.S. court cases against Gaiman and Palmer had been dismissed with judges stating that the allegations would need to be pursued in New Zealand instead.

== Awards and honors ==
- 2005: Best Female Vocalist in the WFNX/Boston Phoenix Best Music Poll.
- 2006: Listed in Blender magazine's hottest women of rock.
- 2006: The Boston Globe named her the most stylish woman in Boston.
- 2007: No. 6 on Spinner.com's "Women Who Rock Right Now".
- 2008: No. 6 on the Best Solo artist list in The Guardian's Readers' Poll of 2008.
- 2009: No. 100 on After Ellen's Hot 100 of 2009.
- 2010: Cover of "Fake Plastic Trees" (Radiohead) named 13th of Paste magazine's 20 Best Cover Songs of 2010
- 2010: Artist of the Year – Boston Music Awards
- 2011: Actress in a local production: Cabaret – Boston's Best, Improper Bostonian
- 2012: Twitter Feed @amandapalmer in the Boston Phoenix's Best 2012
- 2012: Artist & Manager Awards – Pioneer Award
- 2025: She Rocks Awards – Vision Award from the Women's International Music Network

== Discography ==
=== Solo studio albums ===
- Who Killed Amanda Palmer (2008)
- Theatre Is Evil (2012) (with The Grand Theft Orchestra)
- There Will Be No Intermission (2019)

=== Collaborative studio albums ===
- You Got Me Singing (2016) (with Jack Palmer)
- I Can Spin a Rainbow (2017) (with Edward Ka-Spel)
- Forty-Five Degrees - A Bushfire Charity Flash Record (2020) (with various artists)

=== Other albums ===
- Amanda Palmer Performs the Popular Hits of Radiohead on Her Magical Ukulele (2010)
- Amanda Palmer Goes Down Under (2011)
- An Evening With Neil Gaiman & Amanda Palmer (2013) (with Neil Gaiman)
- Piano Is Evil (2016)

== Tours ==
- True Colors Tour (2007)
- Who Killed Amanda Palmer Tour (2008–2009)
- Amanda Palmer: Live in Australia (2010)
- Evelyn Evelyn Tour (2010)
- Dresden Dolls 10th Anniversary Tour (2010–2011)
- Amanda Palmer & The Grand Theft Orchestra: Theatre Is Evil Tour (2012)
- An Evening with Neil Gaiman & Amanda Palmer (2013)
- The Music of David Byrne & The Talking Heads (2014–2015)
- An Evening with Amanda Fucking Palmer (2015)
- The Art of Asking Book Tour (2015)
- You Got Me Singing Tour (with Jack Palmer) (2016)
- I Can Spin a Rainbow Tour (with Edward Ka-Spel) (2017)
- Dresden Dolls Reunion Tour (2017–2018)
- There Will Be No Intermission World Tour (2019–2020)
- An Evening with Amanda Palmer: New Zealand Tour (2020)

== Filmography ==
Year	Title	Notes
2012	Artifact	interviewee
2014	Temple of Art	co-producer
2014	Lennon or McCartney	Short documentary film; interview clip
2019	Happy!	Leader of the Blue Feather (1 episode)

== Podcasts ==
=== The Art of Asking Everything ===
In fall 2020, Palmer announced she would be releasing a podcast called The Art of Asking Everything.

=== Other ===
Year	Title	Episode
April 11, 2016	Design Matters	"Amanda Palmer"
May 22, 2018	Love and Courage	"Amanda Palmer"
June 14, 2018	Róisín Meets	"Amanda Palmer"
January 27, 2019	Conversations with People Who Hate Me	"I Hate Amanda Palmer"
April 17, 2019	The Tim Ferriss Show	"Amanda Palmer on Creativity, Pain, and Art"
April 2019	The Working Songwriter	"Amanda Palmer"
July 23, 2019	KEXP Live Room	"Amanda Palmer"
November 15, 2019	Against Everyone with Conner Habib	"AEWCH 90: Amanda Palmer or We Are All Here For Each Other"
January 17, 2020	'Creative Rebels' with Adam Brazier & David Speed	"The Art of Asking with Amanda Palmer"

== Bibliography ==
Some of the books written in full, or collaboratively, by Amanda Palmer:

- Palmer, Amanda (2006). The Dresden Dolls Companion. New York: Eight Foot Music. ISBN 978-1-57560-888-4.
- Palmer, Amanda; Viglione, Brian (2008). The Dresden Dolls: The Virginia Companion. Cherry Lane Music Company. ISBN 978-1-60378-079-7.
- Palmer, Amanda; Gaiman, Neil; Cassidy, Kyle; Hommel, Beth (2009). Who Killed Amanda Palmer: A Collection of Photographic Evidence. New York: Eight Foot Books. ISBN 978-0-615-23439-7. and accompany songbook
- Von Buhler, Cynthia; Palmer, Amanda; Webley, Jason (2011). Evelyn Evelyn (illustrated ed.). Diamond Comic Distributors. p. 144. ISBN 978-1-59582-578-0.
- Palmer, Amanda (November 11, 2014). The Art of Asking: How I Learned to Stop Worrying and Let People Help. New York: Grand Central Publishing. ISBN 978-1455581085.

== See also ==
- List of TED speakers
