= Yes, Virginia... (album) =

Studio album by the Dresden Dolls
- Released: April 18, 2006
- Recorded: September 10–20, 2005; November 2005 (extra recording)
- Studios: Allaire Studios, Shokan, New York; Camp Street Studios, Cambridge, Massachusetts (extra recording)
- Genre: Dark cabaret
- Length: 55:24
- Label: Roadrunner
- Producers: Sean Slade; Paul Q. Kolderie; The Dresden Dolls

The Dresden Dolls chronology
The Dresden Dolls (2003)	Yes, Virginia... (2006)	No, Virginia... (2008)

Singles from Yes, Virginia...
- 1. "Sing" Released: March 31, 2006; 2. "Backstabber" Released: September 18, 2006; 3. "Shores of California" Released: 2007

Professional ratings
Review scores
Source	Rating
AllMusic	4/5 stars
The Guardian	3/5 stars
Pitchfork	7.6/10
PopMatters	8/10 stars

Yes, Virginia... is the second studio album by American dark cabaret band the Dresden Dolls, released on April 18, 2006, by Roadrunner Records. The album was recorded in September 2005, with some extra vocal work and the mixing done the following November.

It is named after a reply to a letter run in the New York Sun in 1897 about the existence of Santa Claus (see "Yes, Virginia, there is a Santa Claus"). The first single from the album was "Sing". The album made its debut at number 42 on the US Billboard 200, selling 19,000 units in the first week; despite this, the album's sales fell off quickly, resulting in Roadrunner pulling its support for the album shortly after its release and creating tensions between the band and the label.

Other songs recorded during the studio session include "The Kill", "Boston", and "The Gardener", which were released on the No, Virginia... compilation in May 2008.

== Release ==
"Sing" is the first single taken from the second studio album Yes, Virginia..., released on March 31, 2006. It was never released in a physical form, only released digitally as a promo for radio stations. There are two versions of the song, the version on the final album with the opening lyric "There is this thing that's like touching except you don't touch", and the original version available on promo copies of the album which is identical, save an alternate opening lyric, "There is this thing that's like fucking except you don't fuck." "Sing" hit a number of top 50 modern rock charts in April, 2006. The song was covered by The Red Paintings on their Feed the Wolf EP (2007). The song was also covered by jazz vocalist and composer Veronica Swift on her 2021 album This Bitter Earth.

"Shores of California" is the second single taken from the second studio album Yes, Virginia..., released on 2007. The Boston Herald noted that "Shores of California" showed "Palmer's knack for writing bona fide pop tunes with its infectious sing-along chorus and familiar melody". The song's lyrics include the lines "that's the way Aristophanes and Homer / wrote 'the iliad' and 'lysistrata'." Despite the ordering of the lyrics, it was Aristophanes who wrote Lysistrata, and Homer who wrote The Iliad. The Dresden Dolls' official lyrics page notes this by adding to the line in the lyrics: "that's the way Aristophanes and Homer / wrote 'the iliad' and 'lysistrata' (not in that order...)".

== Music video ==
The music video for "Sing", directed by Michael Pope, prominently featured living statues and centered on the plotline of a video of the Dresden Dolls playing the song being sent to various people in different locations and occupations. It also featured the band performing on a stage.

The music video for this single "Shores of California" parodies the video for David Lee Roth's version of "California Girls". It featured Amanda Palmer, Kelly, David J (an original member of the band Bauhaus), Margaret Cho, Jason Webley, as well as the Dresden Dolls's Dirty Business Brigade and other fans that had been encouraged to take part in a band newsletter that was released prior to production. The music video was directed by Andrew Bennett of Shoe String Concert Videos and produced by Frank Caridi. On the official video on YouTube, it is noted that Brian was not available on the day of filming, which explains his absence from the video.

== Track listing ==
All tracks are written by Amanda Palmer.

Yes, Virginia... track listing
No.	Title	Length
1.	"Sex Changes"	4:11
2.	"Backstabber"	4:11
3.	"Modern Moonlight"	4:45
4.	"My Alcoholic Friends"	2:47
5.	"Delilah"	6:54
6.	"Dirty Business"	3:36
7.	"First Orgasm"	3:49
8.	"Mrs. O."	4:40
9.	"Shores of California"	3:35
10.	"Necessary Evil"	2:54
11.	"Mandy Goes to Med School"	4:39
12.	"Me & the Minibar"	4:35
13.	"Sing"	4:40

iTunes bonus track
No.	Title	Length
14.	"Two-Headed Boy" (Neutral Milk Hotel cover)	3:20

== Personnel ==
- Amanda Palmer – vocals, piano, Mellotron, organ
- Brian Viglione – drums, percussion, vocals, bass guitar, guitar
- Sean Slade – producer
- The Dresden Dolls – producer
- Paul Q. Kolderie – mixing, engineering, producer
- Adam Taylor – engineering
- Holly Brewer and Matt McNiss – choir
- Holly Brewer, Whitney Moses, and Mali Sastri – Delilahs
- George Marino – mastering

== Charts ==
Chart performance for Yes, Virginia...
Chart (2006)	Peak position
Australian Albums (ARIA)	52
Austrian Albums (Ö3 Austria)	41
Belgian Albums (Ultratop Flanders)	72
French Albums (SNEP)	138
German Albums (Offizielle Top 100)	41
US Billboard 200	42
