= No, Virginia... =

Compilation album by The Dresden Dolls
- Released: May 17, 2008
- Recorded: 2003 – January 2008
- Studios: Mad Oak, Allston, Massachusetts
- Genres: Dark cabaret; alternative rock
- Length: 48:46
- Label: Roadrunner
- Producers: Sean Slade; Paul Q. Kolderie

The Dresden Dolls chronology
| Yes, Virginia... (2006) | No, Virginia... (2008) |

Singles from No, Virginia...
- 1. "Night Reconnaissance" Released: May 12, 2008

Special edition cover

Professional ratings
Review scores
| Source | Rating |
|---|---|
| AllMusic | 4/5 stars |
| PopMatters | 7/10 stars |
| Pitchfork | 7.1/10 |
| Spin | 7/10 stars |

No, Virginia... is the first compilation album by American dark cabaret band The Dresden Dolls. It was released in Europe on May 19, 2008 and North America on May 20, 2008. A special edition was released in the US via the iTunes Store and Amazon.com's MP3 service on June 10, 2008. The compilation is a companion piece to the band's second studio album, 2006's Yes, Virginia..., and contains tracks left over from recording sessions dating back to 2003, along with B-sides and tracks released on compilations. Singer Amanda Palmer has emphasized that the unreleased tracks from Yes, Virginia... were left off the album due to issues with the flow of the album, and not with the tracks themselves. Five tracks from No, Virginia... were recorded with Sean Slade in January 2008 at Mad Oak Studios. The songs themselves were written years ago but had not been recorded until the session with Slade. One song from the album, "The Kill", has been made available for streaming on the band's MySpace profile.

== Release ==
On April 4, 2008, the band began taking pre-orders for the album. Those who pre-ordered the album directly from the band were able to download a live recording of "Glass Slipper" during the week the album was released. The track may be one of the two live tracks the band considered adding to the standard track listing of the album.

"Night Reconnaissance" is the only single from the album No, Virginia.... The song centers around a girl who lived in a rich suburban neighborhood as a child, and was a victim of bullying. The song implies that she has become an aspiring script writer, basing her films' characters on the personas and prejudgments assumed to her by the bullies, which she hopes will be directed by Steven Spielberg. She attempts to get back at all the people who had done her harm by stealing garden gnomes and other various lawn ornaments from the homes in her old town. Soon however, she develops a strong emotional attachment to the stolen ornaments. The music video for the single mostly follows the storyline summarized above. It was directed by Michael Pope and filmed mostly on Amanda Palmer's parents' front lawn.

== Critical reception ==
Favorable reviews came from Billboard, The Boston Globe, The New York Times, and Paste.

== Track listing ==
All tracks are written by Amanda Palmer, except where noted.

| No. | Title | Writer(s) | Length |
|---|---|---|---|
| 1. | "Dear Jenny" | | 3:07 |
| 2. | "Night Reconnaissance" | | 3:56 |
| 3. | "The Mouse and the Model" (Demo) | | 6:02 |
| 4. | "Ultima Esperanza" | | 4:33 |
| 5. | "The Gardener" (Yes, Virginia... B-side) | | 5:08 |
| 6. | "Lonesome Organist Rapes Page-Turner" (Yes, Virginia... B-side) | | 3:42 |
| 7. | "Sorry Bunch" | | 3:09 |
| 8. | "Pretty in Pink" (The Psychedelic Furs cover) | John Ashton, Tim Butler, Richard Butler, Vince Ely, Duncan Kilburn, Roger Morris | 3:57 |
| 9. | "The Kill" (Yes, Virginia... B-side) | | 3:49 |
| 10. | "The Sheep Song" | | 3:59 |
| 11. | "Boston" (Yes, Virginia... B-side) | | 7:20 |

Pre-order bonus tracks
| No. | Title | Length |
|---|---|---|
| 12. | "Glass Slipper" (live in St. Louis, January 6, 2008) | 9:00 |

Special edition bonus tracks
| No. | Title | Writer(s) | Length |
|---|---|---|---|
| 12. | "Glass Slipper" (live in St. Louis, January 6, 2008) | | 9:00 |
| 13. | "A Night at the Roses" ("Good Day" B-side) | | 4:43 |
| 14. | "I Would for You" (Yes, Virginia... B-side; Jane's Addiction cover) | Perry Farrell, Dave Navarro, Eric Avery, Stephen Perkins | 4:33 |

The special edition was digital only, whereas the standard edition was published both in CD and vinyl formats.

== Personnel ==
- Amanda Palmer – piano, vocals, lyricist, composer, songwriter
- Brian Viglione – drums, guitar, backing vocals
- Sean Slade – production, mixing
- George Marino – mastering
- Benny Grotto – mixing, engineering
- Brian Koerber – assistant engineer

== Charts ==
Chart performance for No, Virginia...
| Chart (2008) | Peak position |
|---|---|
| Australian Albums (ARIA) | 78 |
| Austrian Albums (Ö3 Austria) | 70 |
| US Billboard 200 | 94 |
