= The Dresden Dolls (album) =

Studio album by The Dresden Dolls
- Released: September 26, 2003 (8 Ft. Records release); April 27, 2004 (Roadrunner U.S. release); July 13, 2005 (Roadrunner Japanese release)
- Recorded: Summer/Fall 2002
- Genre: Dark cabaret
- Length: 56:53
- Label: 8ft., Roadrunner
- Producer: Martin Bisi

The Dresden Dolls chronology
A Is for Accident (2003)	The Dresden Dolls (2003)	Yes, Virginia... (2006)

Singles from The Dresden Dolls
- 1. "Girl Anachronism" Released: October 2003; 2. "Good Day" Released: December 2003; 3. "Coin-Operated Boy" Released: December 13, 2004

Professional ratings
Review scores
Source	Rating
Allmusic	4/5 stars
Pitchfork Media	8.2/10

The Dresden Dolls is the debut studio album by American dark cabaret duo The Dresden Dolls. It was recorded by Brooklyn producer Martin Bisi and released on September 26, 2003 on 8 ft. Records, the band's personal label. Upon signing with Roadrunner Records, the album was re-released on April 27, 2004.

This is Amanda Palmer's highest-selling album, a 2004 re-release, has sold 149,000 copies; none of her subsequent albums (two more Dresden Dolls records, a solo release and an album by a project called Evelyn Evelyn) crossed the 100,000 mark, according to Nielsen SoundScan.

== Release ==
The enhanced CD included a video for "Girl Anachronism". The album artwork was also modified to mask which record sleeves had been used in the album artwork.

"Good Day" is the first single from the debut album. It was originally released by Important Records in December 2003 in an edition of 500 on white vinyl. The set also included a photograph signed by Amanda Palmer and Brian Viglione. The 7" was later reissued in October 2005 on Palmer's own label, 8 Ft. Records during the band's Fall 2005 North American tour. The cover of the reissue depicted a painting by Barnaby Whitfield that recreated the photo from the original release. The B-side, "A Night at the Roses," features a noticeably different sound from the band's usual material, with Palmer contributing vocals and tambourine, and Viglione playing the electric guitar. The song was only available on this single on vinyl until 2007, when Important included it on the IMPREC100 - A Users Guide to the First 100 Important Releases compilation CD. The song was also made available as part of a digital download for No, Virginia... on June 10, 2008 and as an unlisted bonus track with the full album download for the A Is for Accident re-release at bandcamp.com.

== The Dresden Dolls Companion ==
In The Dresden Dolls Companion, Amanda Palmer has published a history of this album and of the duo, as well as a partial autobiography. The book also contains the lyrics, sheet music, and notes on each song in the album, as well as a DVD with a 20-minute interview with Amanda. In the interview, Amanda discusses the making of the album and the artwork while working on the artwork in her apartment.

== Track listing ==
All tracks are written by Amanda Palmer.

No.	Title	Length
1.	"Good Day"	5:51
2.	"Girl Anachronism"	2:59
3.	"Missed Me"	4:53
4.	"Half Jack"	5:57
5.	"672"	1:24
6.	"Coin-Operated Boy"	4:46
7.	"Gravity"	4:19
8.	"Bad Habit"	3:01
9.	"The Perfect Fit"	5:45
10.	"The Jeep Song"	4:50
11.	"Slide"	4:30
12.	"Truce" (The song ends at minute 8:00. After 27 seconds of silence, a recording of Amanda's grandma begins that says "Amanda, you're telling me a fairy tale".)	8:34

== Personnel ==
The Dresden Dolls

- Amanda Palmer – piano, toy piano, vocals, lyricist, composer, songwriter
- Brian Viglione – drums, guitar, backing vocals

Additional personnel

- Ad Frank – electric guitar, backing vocals
- Shawn Setaro – bass guitar, acoustic guitar
- Sasha Forte – violin, viola
- Johnathan Sacks – cello
- Martin Bisi – Memory Man
