= Kyle Cassidy =

American photographer (born 1966)

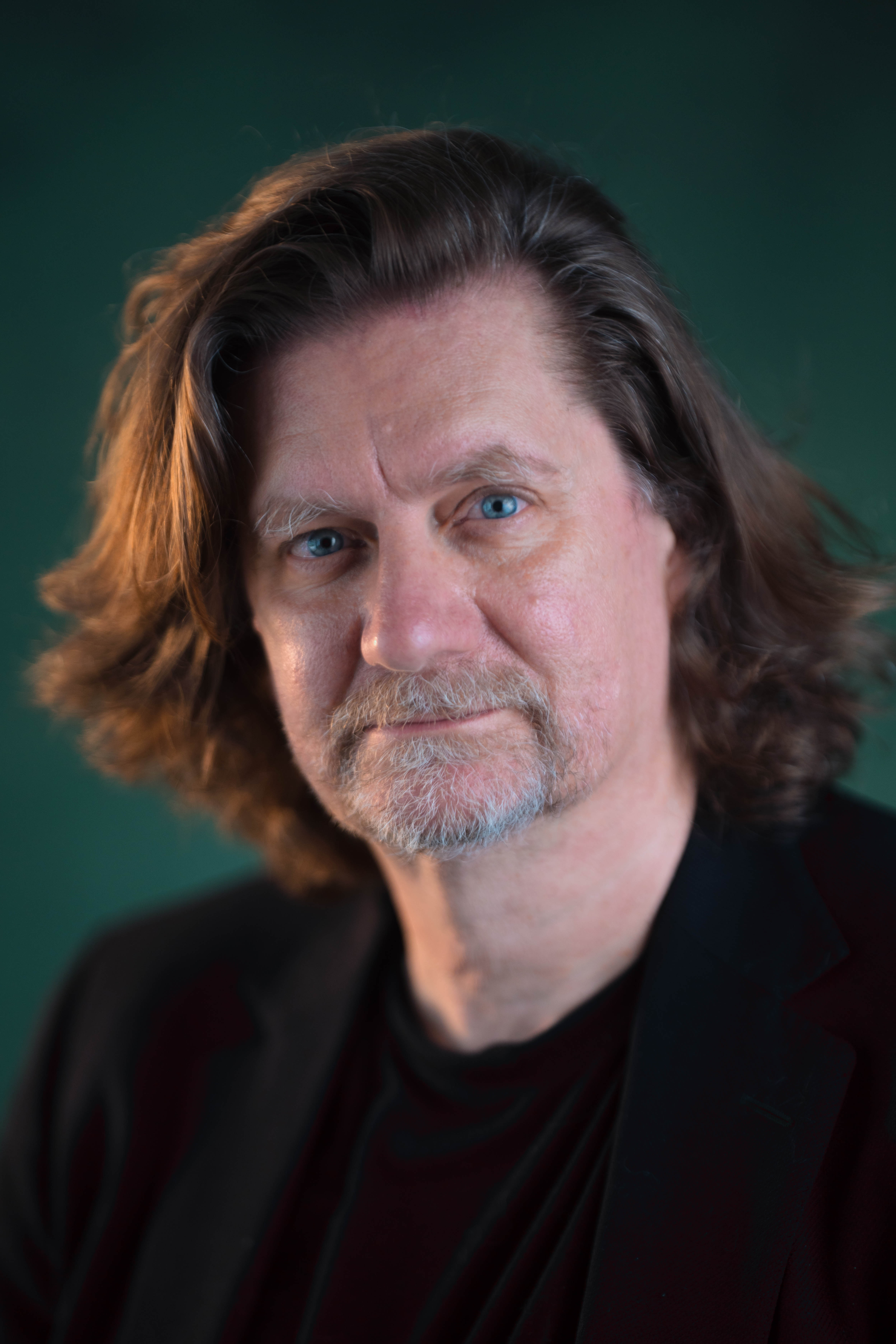
- A portrait of Kyle Cassidy from Summer 2026
- Born: October 31, 1966 (age 60); Woodbury, New Jersey, U.S.
- Education: Rowan University
- Known for: Author, photographer
- Notable work: Armed America: Portraits of Gun Owners in Their Homes
- Website: www.kylecassidy.com

Kyle Cassidy (born October 31, 1966) is an American photographer, videographer, author, and filmmaker based in West Philadelphia. He is known for documentary and portrait projects including Armed America: Portraits of Gun Owners in Their Homes, This Is What a Librarian Looks Like, and Between Us and Catastrophe, a series on essential workers during the COVID-19 pandemic. His later work has also included collaborative book and film projects on Icelandic knitwear, Elizabeth Siddal, and a pandemic-era adaptation of Henrik Ibsen’s A Doll’s House.

== Contributions to photography ==
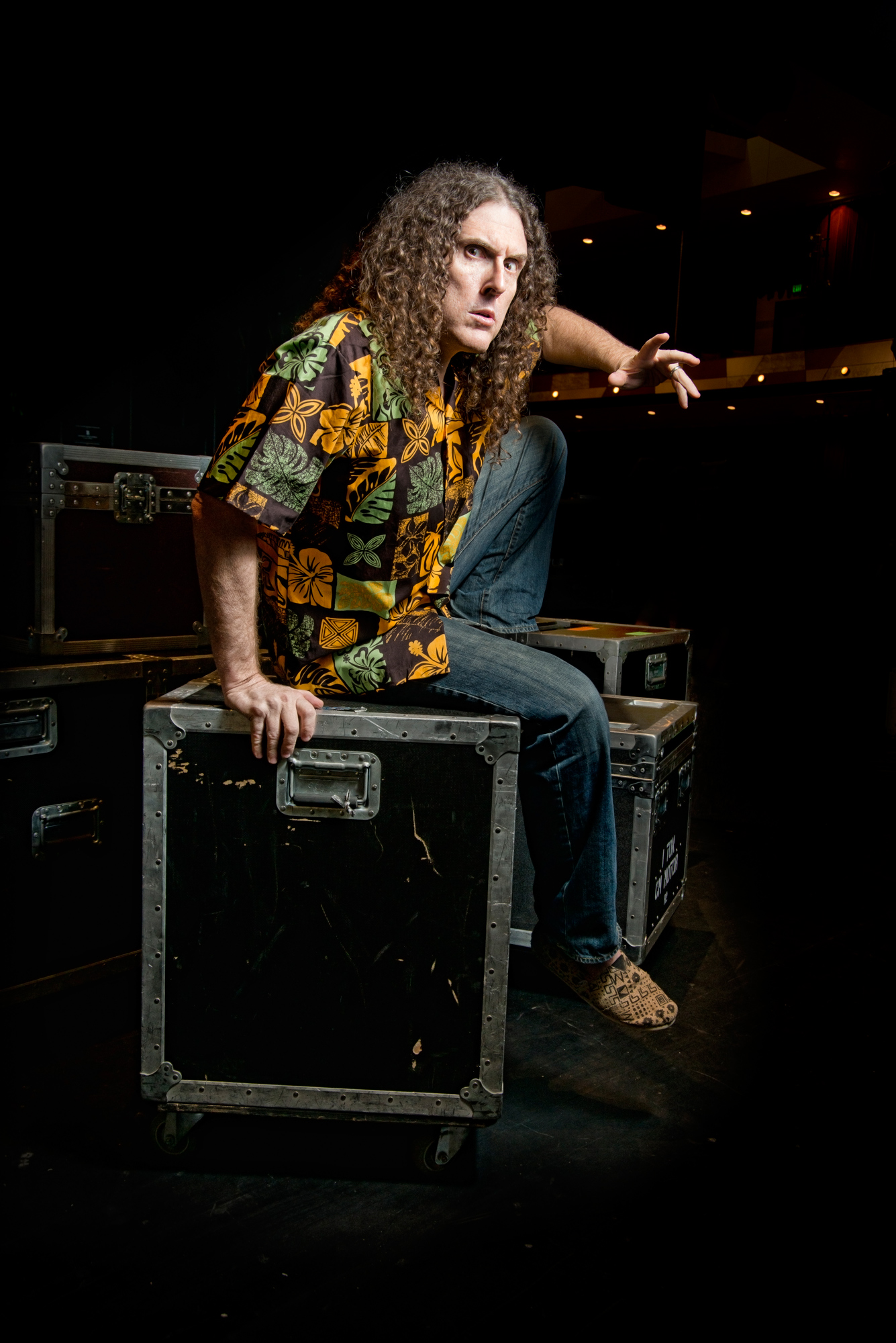
Publicity photo of Weird Al Yankovic

Cassidy's "Photo-a-Week" project began on January 1, 2000. His photography has combined documentary portraiture with staged and imaginative imagery, and his work has often explored questions of truth, fiction, humor, and performance.

His work on American gun culture led to the book Armed America: Portraits of Gun Owners in Their Homes (2007), which was described by The New York Times as a portrait of a controversial culture and was later named by Amazon among its notable books of the year.

Cassidy's approach to portraiture has resulted in book covers and album art. In the early days of Occupy Wall Street, he set up mini-portrait studios at both the New York City and Philadelphia protests in order to remove the immediate protest setting and focus on the individuality of the people attending; the photographs were published by The Huffington Post. He later photographed the scientists responsible for the discoveries of the New Horizons probe.

In 2012, Cassidy released War Paint: Tattoo Culture & the Armed Forces, a book of photographs and interviews with tattooed veteran soldiers. In 2013, he became involved with the North Dakota Man Camp Project, documenting the lives of oil workers in the Bakken region; photographs from the project later appeared in a Slate photo essay and in the open-access volume The Bakken Goes Boom.

In October 2013, Cassidy's poster and photograph for the Curio Theatre Company's production of Romeo and Juliet led to an interview in The New York Times. The Curio Romeo and Juliet poster later appeared in Presenting Shakespeare: 1,100 Posters from Around the World, a 2015 compilation of theatrical poster design, and Cassidy's work was also featured in CNN's gallery "Shakespeare posters from around the world", which credited his Romeo and Juliet design for Curio Theatre.

In 2014, Cassidy's photo essay "This Is What a Librarian Looks Like", based on photographs taken at an American Library Association event, was published by Slate. He continued to photograph librarians and libraries in the following years, culminating in the 2017 photobook This Is What a Librarian Looks Like: A Celebration of Libraries, Communities, and Access to Information.

During the COVID-19 pandemic, Cassidy created Between Us and Catastrophe, a portrait and interview project documenting essential workers in the Philadelphia region. The project was exhibited outdoors at the Science History Institute in Philadelphia from October 2020 to August 2021, and photographs and interviews from the project were later incorporated into the Mütter Museum exhibition Trusted Messengers: Community, Confidence, and COVID-19.

Cassidy’s later projects have also included collaborative work on Icelandic knitwear and Elizabeth Siddal. With Joan of Dark, he contributed photography to Lopapeysa: A Knitter’s Guide to Iceland with Patterns, Techniques and Travel Tips and The Lopapeysa Sweater: A Journey North in Search of Iceland’s Iconic Knitwear. With Trillian Stars, he collaborated on books centered on Victorian poet and artist Elizabeth Eleanor Siddal, including This Is Only Earth, My Dear.

Cassidy has also photographed musician and filmmaker John Carpenter for portrait and album projects. Official Carpenter pages and behind-the-scenes coverage have credited Cassidy for photography connected to the Lost Themes projects.

In addition to documentary work, Cassidy has produced staged and fantastical imagery for alternative-culture publications such as Gothic Beauty.

== Film and video work ==
Cassidy directed A Doll’s House 20/20, a feature-length adaptation of Henrik Ibsen’s A Doll’s House set during the COVID-19 pandemic and co-starring Jennifer Summerfield. Developed from a planned stage production, the film reimagined the play’s characters in quarantine and was released to coincide with the one-year anniversary of Philadelphia’s stay-at-home order. British singer-songwriter Jo Beth Young composed the original soundtrack, including the single "Mechanical Ballerina".

== Contributions to technology ==
Cassidy’s early career focused on computer networking and internet technologies. He wrote several introductory and intermediate guides to network administration and internetworking, including SATURN: A Beginners Guide to Using the Internet, Stickman’s Way Cool Guide to Network Wizardry, The Concise Guide to Enterprise Internetworking and Security, and Introduction to Windows 2000 Network Administration. He also co-authored the technical report "Can You Trust Your Email?" (1993), which discussed vulnerabilities in email-delivery protocols and the potential for forged messages.

In later work, Cassidy collaborated with communication scholars on projects examining infrastructure and urban communication technologies. With Jessa Lingel he co-presented "Payphone Portraits and Urban Imagination" in the International Communication Association’s Making & Doing exhibition, and a related project, "The Payphone: Portraits of Urban Resilience", was presented at the Society for Social Studies of Science. These projects used interviews and photographic documentation to explore the continued use, repair, and repurposing of payphones in contemporary cities.

Cassidy also contributed visual documentation to Alchemical Infrastructures: Making Blockchain in Iceland, a research project on cryptocurrency mining, energy infrastructures, and data-center politics in Iceland.

== Published work ==
He has written books on information technology and photography and has worked as a contributing editor for Videomaker. His works include:

- Cassidy, Kyle (2017). This Is What a Librarian Looks Like: A Celebration of Libraries, Communities, and Access to Information. New York: Hachette Book Group. ISBN 9780316393980.
- Cassidy, Kyle (2012). War Paint: Tattoo Culture & the Armed Forces. Schiffer Publishing. ISBN 978-0-7643-4086-4.
- Amanda Palmer; Neil Gaiman; Kyle Cassidy; Beth Hommel (2009). Who Killed Amanda Palmer: A Collection of Photographic Evidence. New York: Eight Foot Books. ISBN 978-0-615-23439-7.
- Cassidy, Kyle (2007). Armed America: Portraits of Gun Owners in Their Homes. Krause Publications. ISBN 978-0-89689-543-0.
- Cassidy, Kyle (2001). Introduction to Windows 2000 Network Administration. Que Publishing. ISBN 0-7897-2419-7.
- Cassidy, Kyle; Dries, Joseph Francis III (2000). The Concise Guide to Enterprise Internetworking and Security. Que Publishing. ISBN 978-0-7897-2420-5.
- Cassidy, Kyle (1994). Stickman's Way Cool Guide to Network Wizardry. Glassboro, NJ: Rowan College Academic Computing Press.
- Cassidy, Kyle (1994). SATURN: A Beginners Guide To Using the Internet. Glassboro, NJ: Rowan College Academic Computing Press.
- Carr, Toni; Cassidy, Kyle (photographs) (2022). Lopapeysa: A Knitter’s Guide to Iceland with Patterns, Techniques and Travel Tips.
- Carr, Toni; Cassidy, Kyle (photographs) (2023). The Lopapeysa Sweater: A Journey North in Search of Iceland's Iconic Knitwear.
- Cassidy, Kyle; Stars, Trillian (2025). This Is Only Earth, My Dear: Images by Trillian Stars and Kyle Cassidy with Poems by Elizabeth Siddal. Beehive Books.
- Cassidy, Kyle; Stars, Trillian (2025). The (Mostly) Complete Poems of Elizabeth Eleanor Siddal.

== Selected exhibitions ==
- Lies, Sol Gallery, Philadelphia, 2006.
- Payphone Portraits and Urban Imagination, CAMRA’s Screening Scholarship Media Festival (SSMF), 2023.
- Between Us and Catastrophe, CAMRA’s Screening Scholarship Media Festival (SSMF), 2024.
- Between Us and Catastrophe, Science History Institute, Philadelphia, October 2020–August 2021.
- Trusted Messengers: Community, Confidence, and COVID-19, Mütter Museum, Philadelphia, 2025–2026; included Cassidy’s photographs and interviews from Between Us and Catastrophe.

== Later work ==
During the COVID-19 pandemic Cassidy expanded his practice into collaborative projects that linked documentary photography with knitting, literary history, and film. He learned to knit during lockdown and later collaborated with Joan of Dark on projects about Icelandic knitwear; one related sweater design was later released on Ravelry as the "Dead Boy Detectives Lopapeysa" pattern.

With Trillian Stars, Cassidy also developed a multimedia project around Elizabeth Siddal that included books, interviews, podcasts, and a commissioned musical collaboration with Evi Vine. The music project debuted at Highgate Cemetery in London, where Siddal is buried, in an event titled Oh Silent Wood.
