= Essential Oils (album) =

Greatest hits album by Midnight Oil
- Released: 2 November 2012
- Recorded: 1977–2001
- Length: 151:10
- Label: Sony Music Entertainment
- Producer: Legacy

Midnight Oil chronology
Flat Chat (2006)	Essential Oils (2012)	Armistice Day (2018)

Professional ratings
Review scores
Source	Rating
AllMusic	4/5 stars
Popmatters	7/10 stars

Essential Oils is a two-disc compilation album by Australian rock band Midnight Oil released in November 2012.

At the time of its release, the compilation covered Midnight Oil's entire career, starting with the group's 1978 self-titled album and including, in chronological order, tracks from all their studio albums and EPs up to and including the album Capricornia (2002). Essential Oils was released during the period in which Midnight Oil had broken up in the wake of lead singer Peter Garrett focusing on his political career. The band reformed in 2016, embarked on concert tours (2017, 2019, 2022) and released two further studio albums, The Makarrata Project (2020) and Resist (2022).

Given its comprehensive 36-song track list, the two-disc Essential Oils effectively supplants Midnight Oil's previous greatest-hits compilation, the one-disc, 18-track album 20,000 Watt R.S.L. (1997). There is only one track in 20,000 Watt R.S.L. ("What Goes On") that is not included in Essential Oils.

Essential Oils contains twelve songs that were included in Flat Chat (2006), an 18-track compilation of Midnight Oil's heavier rock songs. (The Flat Chat tracks that do not appear on Essential Oils are "Section 5 (Bus to Bondi)", "Tell Me the Truth", "Stand in Line", "Pictures", "Written in the Heart" and "Mosquito March".)

Essential Oils contains liner notes by American music journalist David Fricke. The album charted at number 7 on the ARIA Charts and on the Official New Zealand Music Chart.

== Reception ==
- Vintage Rock says, "The aptly named Essential Oils is a double CD compilation that pretty much spans the entire career of Australia's Midnight Oil – beginning with tracks from their 1978 self-titled release, followed by more from the subsequent 10 albums and two EPs. The kinetic high-end bass, and a two-guitar kinetic punk-like sensibility of “Run By Night” is the only song on this 36-song collection from the band's first album."
- Glide Magazine says, "One CD might have done the job, but there's little bloat here and more than enough to entice die-hards and new listeners with a proper reflection on the group's genesis, process and closure. Essential Oils draws from all 14 of their recordings between 1978 and 2002. At 36 songs, the album traces a journey of demanding social justice through song, ones that evolve from polished punk to textured pop to industrial mayhem."
- Spectrum Culture say that "American audiences will likely know Midnight Oil for its 1987 hit “Beds Are Burning,” off the internationally popular Diesel and Dust. That platinum-selling album was the band's first real success stateside, but Midnight Oil were already superstars back home in Australia, where their aggressive brand of politically-charged rock had taken on uranium mining, Tibet and a monopoly within the Sydney music industry."

== Track listing ==
Disc 1
No.	Title	Writer(s)	Length
1.	"Run By Night" (from the album Midnight Oil, 1978)	Rob Hirst, Jim Moginie, Martin Rotsey	3:56
2.	"Cold Cold Change" (from the album Head Injuries, 1979)	Hirst, Moginie	3:29
3.	"Back on the Borderline" (from the album Head Injuries, 1979)	Peter Garrett, Moginie, Andrew James	3:09
4.	"Wedding Cake Island" (from the EP Bird Noises, 1980)	Garrett, Peter Gifford, Hirst, Moginie, Rotsey	3:11
5.	"No Time for Games" (from the EP Bird Noises, 1980)	Garrett, Gifford, Hirst, Moginie, Rotsey	4:33
6.	"Don't Wanna Be the One" (from the album Place without a Postcard, 1981)	Garrett, Hirst, Moginie, Rotsey	3:05
7.	"Armistice Day" (from the album Place without a Postcard, 1981)	Hirst, Moginie, Rotsey	4:29
8.	"Lucky Country" (from the album Place without a Postcard, 1981)	Garrett, Hirst, Moginie, Rotsey	4:53
9.	"Only the Strong" (from the album 10, 9, 8, 7, 6, 5, 4, 3, 2, 1, 1982)	Hirst, Moginie	4:34
10.	"Short Memory" (from the album 10, 9, 8, 7, 6, 5, 4, 3, 2, 1, 1982)	Garrett, Hirst, Moginie	3:52
11.	"Read About It" (from the album 10, 9, 8, 7, 6, 5, 4, 3, 2, 1, 1982)	Garrett, Hirst, Moginie	3:52
12.	"US Forces" (from the album 10, 9, 8, 7, 6, 5, 4, 3, 2, 1, 1982)	Garrett, Moginie	4:05
13.	"Power and the Passion" (from the album 10, 9, 8, 7, 6, 5, 4, 3, 2, 1, 1982)	Garrett, Hirst, Moginie	5:39
14.	"When the Generals Talk" (from the album Red Sails in the Sunset, 1984)	Garrett, Hirst, Moginie	3:32
15.	"Best of Both Worlds" (from the album Red Sails in the Sunset, 1984)	Hirst, Moginie	4:03
16.	"Kosciusko" (from the album Red Sails in the Sunset, 1984)	Hirst, Moginie	4:41
17.	"Progress" (from the EP Species Deceases, 1985)	Garrett, Gifford, Hirst, Moginie, Rotsey	3:54
18.	"Hercules" (from the EP Species Deceases, 1985)	Garrett, Gifford, Hirst, Moginie, Rotsey	4:29

Disc 2
No.	Title	Writer(s)	Length
1.	"Beds Are Burning" (from the album Diesel and Dust, 1987)	Peter Garrett, Rob Hirst, Jim Moginie	4:15
2.	"Put Down That Weapon" (from the album Diesel and Dust, 1987)	Garrett, Hirst, Moginie	4:38
3.	"Dreamworld" (from the album Diesel and Dust, 1987)	Garrett, Hirst, Moginie	3:36
4.	"The Dead Heart" (from the album Diesel and Dust, 1987)	Garrett, Hirst, Moginie	5:11
5.	"Warakurna" (from the album Diesel and Dust, 1987)	Moginie	4:37
6.	"Blue Sky Mine" (from the album Blue Sky Mining, 1990)	Hirst, Moginie, Garrett, Rotsey, Bones Hillman	4:15
7.	"Forgotten Years" (from the album Blue Sky Mining, 1990)	Hirst, Moginie	4:27
8.	"King of the Mountain" (from the album Blue Sky Mining, 1990)	Hirst, Moginie	3:49
9.	"One Country" (from the album Blue Sky Mining, 1990)	Garrett, Moginie	5:53
10.	"Truganini" (from the album Earth and Sun and Moon, 1993)	Hirst, Moginie	5:08
11.	"My Country" (from the album Earth and Sun and Moon, 1993)	Hirst	4:53
12.	"In the Valley" (from the album Earth and Sun and Moon, 1993)	Garrett, Hirst, Moginie	4:40
13.	"Surf's Up Tonight" (from the album Breathe, 1996)	Garrett, Moginie	3:05
14.	"Redneck Wonderland" (from the album Redneck Wonderland, 1998)	Hirst, Moginie	3:08
15.	"White Skin Black Heart" (from the album Redneck Wonderland, 1998)	Garrett, Hirst, Moginie	4:01
16.	"Say Your Prayers" (from the album The Real Thing, 2000)	Moginie	4:25
17.	"Golden Age" (from the album Capricornia, 2002)	Garrett, Hirst, Moginie	3:41
18.	"Luritja Way" (from the album Capricornia, 2002)	Hirst, Moginie	4:00

== Charts ==
Chart (2012–2017)	Peak position
Australian Albums (ARIA)	7
New Zealand Albums (RMNZ)	7

== Certifications ==
Region	Certification	Certified units/sales
Australia (ARIA)	Platinum	70,000^{‡}
^{‡} Sales+streaming figures based on certification alone.
