= 20,000 Watt R.S.L. =

Greatest hits album by Midnight Oil
- Released: 13 October 1997
- Recorded: 1979–1997
- Genre: Rock
- Length: 75:55
- Label: Sprint Music; CBS

Midnight Oil chronology
Breathe (1996)	20,000 Watt R.S.L. (1997)	Redneck Wonderland (1998)

Professional ratings
Review scores
Source	Rating
AllMusic	3/5 stars

20,000 Watt R.S.L. is a compilation album by Australian rock band Midnight Oil, released on 13 October 1997 on their own label Sprint Music. The compilation covers the majority of Midnight Oil's career, starting with their 1979 album Head Injuries, and includes tracks from all their major studio releases (and one EP), even including two songs from the then-forthcoming Redneck Wonderland album, which was released after this compilation in 1998. The compilation does not include any material from the band's eponymous 1978 debut album or the Bird Noises EP (1980). The liner notes contain an essay on the band by Australian author Tim Winton.

The album peaked at number 1 on the Australian Recording Industry Association (ARIA) albums chart, and achieved 5× Platinum sales. It also peaked at number 18 in New Zealand.

The word "Collection" appears on the front of the album along the hinge in the same type face as the title and the name of the band and may have been intended as part of the album's title; however, it does not appear on the spine. The release has also been distributed inside a cardboard sleeve that adds "Midnight Oil: The Hits" to the album art, distinguishing it as a compilation album.

In 2012, Midnight Oil released the 2-disc compilation album Essential Oils, a more comprehensive summary of the band's career, and which includes material from all of the band's studio albums and EPs between 1978 and 2002. There is only one song ("What Goes On") included on 20,000 Watt R.S.L. that is not included on Essential Oils.

== Background ==
Midnight Oil are an Australian rock band from Sydney formed in 1976 with vocalist Peter Garrett, drummer Rob Hirst, bass guitarist Andrew James and keyboardist/lead guitarist Jim Moginie, Guitarist Martin Rotsey joined in 1977, after which Midnight Oil established their own record label Powderworks; they released their second album Head Injuries on this label in October 1979. Founding bass guitarist James left due to illness in 1980, he was replaced by Peter Gifford, Gifford was himself replaced by Bones Hillman in 1987.

Australian top-ten singles were "Power and the Passion", "The Dead Heart", "Beds Are Burning" and "Blue Sky Mine". Aside from chart success both "Power and the Passion" and "Beds Are Burning" were listed by Australasian Performing Right Association (APRA) on their top 30 best Australian songs of all time list in 2001. Through a long and distinguished career, the band became known for its driving hard-rock sound, intense live performances and political activism, particularly in aid of anti-nuclear, environmentalist and indigenous causes.

The title refers to the Returned Servicemen's League, whose clubs the band has performed in, and the typical power used by a public address system.

== Track listing ==
Songwriters according to Australasian Performing Right Association (APRA):

1. "What Goes On" (Garrett, Hillman, Hirst, Moginie, Rotsey)
2. "Power and the Passion" (Garrett, Hirst, Moginie)
3. "Dreamworld" (Garrett, Hirst, Moginie)
4. "White Skin Black Heart" (Garrett, Hillman, Hirst, Moginie, Rotsey)
5. "Kosciuszko" (Hirst, Moginie)
6. "The Dead Heart" (Garrett, Hirst, Moginie)
7. "Blue Sky Mine" (Garrett, Hillman, Hirst, Moginie, Rotsey)
8. "US Forces" (Garrett, Moginie)
9. "Beds Are Burning" (Garrett, Hirst, Moginie)
10. "One Country" (Garrett, Moginie)
11. "Best of Both Worlds" (Hirst, Moginie)
12. "Truganini" (Hirst, Moginie)
13. "King of the Mountain" (Hirst, Moginie)
14. "Hercules" (Garrett, Hirst, Moginie)
15. "Surf's Up Tonight" (Garrett, Hillman, Hirst, Moginie, Rotsey)
16. "Back on the Borderline" (Garrett, Hirst, James)
17. "Don't Wanna Be the One" (Garrett, Hirst, Moginie, Rotsey)
18. "Forgotten Years" (Hirst, Moginie)

== Charts ==
=== Weekly charts ===
Chart (1997–1998)	Peak position
Australian Albums (ARIA)	1
German Albums (Offizielle Top 100)	78
New Zealand Albums (RMNZ)	18

=== Year-end charts ===
Chart (1997)	Position
Australian Albums (ARIA)	28
Chart (1998)	Position
Australian Albums (ARIA)	72

== Certifications ==
=== Album ===
Region	Certification	Certified units/sales
Australia (ARIA)	5× Platinum	350,000^{^}
^{^} Shipments figures based on certification alone.

=== Video ===
Region	Certification	Certified units/sales
Australia (ARIA)	5× Platinum	75,000^{^}
^{^} Shipments figures based on certification alone.

== Personnel ==
Midnight Oil

- Peter Garrett – vocals, harmonica
- Peter Gifford – bass, vocals (on tracks 2, 3, 5, 6, 8, 9, 11, 14, 17)
- Bones Hillman – bass, vocals (on tracks 1, 4, 7, 10, 12, 13, 15, 18)
- Rob Hirst – drums, vocals
- Andrew James – bass (on track 16)
- Jim Moginie – guitars, keyboards, vocals
- Martin Rotsey – guitars

Additional personnel

- Gary Barnacle, Peter Thoms, Luke Tunney - brass on 'Power and the Passion'
