= Oil Rag =

The Oil Rag was a promotional newspaper issued by the Australian rock band Midnight Oil to coincide with studio albums and tours. There were six volumes of the Oil Rag:

- Vol. I (1987) "What Midnight Oil Means to Australia", 8 pages, for background information on the band
- Vol. II (1988) "Consolidated Oil", edited by Denise Officer-Brewster and Andrew McMillan, 8 pages, for the album Diesel and Dust
- Vol. III (1990) "With Axes In Its Eyes", edited by Denise Officer-Brewster, 8 pages, for the album Blue Sky Mining
- Vol. IV (1993) "Oils Return to Orbit", edited by Ed St John, 8 pages, for the album Earth and Sun and Moon
- Vol. V (1996), 4 pages, for the album Breathe
- Vol. VI (1998) "Redneck Wonderland Advocate", edited by Mark Dodshon for the album Redneck Wonderland

There also was a 1983 release of the same concept for the album 10, 9, 8, 7, 6, 5, 4, 3, 2, 1 ("Oil Change", 4 pages) that was not yet officially named Oil Rag. The Oil Rag aimed to keep fans up to date on the musical and political activities of the band and were anti-corporate and anti-fashion. They, among others, contained pictures, magazine articles, album lyrics, album and concert reviews and band interviews, and were distributed with promotional album releases or in response to fan mail.
