= Power and the Passion (song) =

- Standard artwork (Australian 7-inch vinyl single pictured)

Single by Midnight Oil

from the album 10, 9, 8, 7, 6, 5, 4, 3, 2, 1
- Released: March 1983
- Genre: New wave, post-punk
- Length: 5:39
- Label: Columbia
- Songwriters: James Moginie; Robert Hirst; Peter Garrett
- Producers: Midnight Oil, Nick Launay

Midnight Oil singles chronology
"US Forces" (1982)	"Power and the Passion" (1983)	"Read About It" (1983)

Music video
- Power and the Passion on YouTube

"Power and the Passion" is the second single from Midnight Oil's 1982 album 10, 9, 8, 7, 6, 5, 4, 3, 2, 1 (following "US Forces"). The song is one of the band's most famous, and it was performed on every Midnight Oil tour since the issue of 10, 9, 8, 7, 6, 5, 4, 3, 2, 1 as well as at the WaveAid concert.

At the 1983 Countdown Music Awards, the song won Best Australian Single.

In January 2018, as part of Triple M's "Ozzest 100", the 'most Australian' songs of all time, "Power and the Passion" was ranked number 29, and in 2025, it placed 66 on the Triple J Hottest 100 of Australian Songs.

== Lyrics and composition ==
The lyrics mention former Australian prime minister Gough Whitlam and his dismissal in 1975, as well as the Pine Gap spy base, which remain controversial issues in Australia to this day. The song also makes reference to the McDonald's Big Mac and paraphrases Emiliano Zapata with the line "It's better to die on your feet than to live on your knees."

The song includes a drum solo by Rob Hirst; it is the only studio recording by Midnight Oil to feature a drum solo.

== Legacy ==
In May 2001 the Australasian Performing Right Association (APRA), as part of its 75th Anniversary celebrations, named "Power and the Passion" as one of the Top 30 Australian songs of all time. It was the second Midnight Oil song in the list with "Beds Are Burning" declared third behind the Easybeats' "Friday on My Mind" and Daddy Cool's "Eagle Rock".

It was performed by the band at the 2009 Sound Relief concert in Melbourne.

On 5 June 2012, the song was released as downloadable content for the video game Rock Band 3.

== Music video ==
The video for "Power and the Passion" was filmed in 1982 amongst the "Woolloomooloo Mural Project" in Sydney, NSW, Australia.

== Track listing ==
1. "Power and the Passion" - 4:45
2. "Power and the Passion" (Dub Version) - 4:39

== Compilations ==
This track was placed on the band's collection 20,000 Watt R.S.L.

More recently, the title of the collection Flat Chat was derived from the lyrics of this song. However, this song was not featured on that collection.

A newly remastered version was then featured on the band's second "greatest hits" album, Essential Oils, in 2012.

== US 12-inch version ==
The US 12-inch single release features a little-known specially remixed version, mixed by François Kevorkian and Dominic Malta at RPM Sound Studios specifically for the North American market. This special version, titled "Glitch Baby Glitch", did not appear on the 12-inch single as released elsewhere in the world, including in Australia, whose 12-inch single featured the standard album version which runs for 5:38. The remix features echo effects added to Peter Garrett's vocals and a continuation or reprise of Rob Hirst's drum solo after the nominal ending of the song.

== Live versions ==
Live versions of "Power and the Passion" were not available legally until 2004, when the Best of Both Worlds CD/two-DVD set featured two. One (on the Oils on the Water CD/DVD) was from early 1985 (the Red Sails in the Sunset tour) and the other (on the Saturday Night at the Capitol DVD) was from 1982 ( the 10, 9, 8, 7, 6, 5, 4, 3, 2, 1 tour).

The song's drum solo was often performed significantly faster.

== Personnel ==
- Peter Garrett - lead vocals
- Peter Gifford - bass, backup vocals
- Martin Rotsey - guitar
- Jim Moginie - guitar, keyboards
- Rob Hirst - drums, percussion

with

- Gary Barnacle, Peter Thoms, Luke Tunney - brass

== Charts ==
=== Weekly charts ===
Chart (1983–1984)	Peak position
Australia (Kent Music Report)	8
New Zealand (Recorded Music NZ)	4

=== Year-end charts ===
Chart (1983)	Position
Australia (Kent Music Report)	82
Chart (1984)	Position
New Zealand (Recorded Music NZ)	39

== Certifications ==
Certifications for "Power and the Passion"
Region	Certification	Certified units/sales
New Zealand (RMNZ)	Gold	15,000^{‡}
^{‡} Sales+streaming figures based on certification alone.
