= Best of Both Worlds (Midnight Oil album) =

Live album by Midnight Oil
- Released: 5 April 2004
- Genre: Rock
- Length: 135 min (DVD) / 72:42 (CD)
- Label: Midnight Oil / ABC Music
- Producer: Keith Walker / Justin Heitman / Jim Moginie

Midnight Oil chronology
Capricornia (2001)	Best of Both Worlds (2004)	Flat Chat (2006)

Best of Both Worlds is a DVD-Video release of two significant concerts performed by Australian rock band Midnight Oil. The featured concerts are Oils on the Water (from 1985) and Saturday Night at the Capitol (1982). Best of Both Worlds was released in 2004 by Triple J as part of their Live at the Wireless program. At the ARIA Music Awards of 2004 it won Best Music DVD.

== Oils on the Water ==
Oils on the Water was staged on 13 January 1985 to celebrate the 10th anniversary of Triple J, Australia's publicly owned youth radio network. This concert was performed on Sydney's Goat Island for a small audience of competition winners, and was simulcast on ABC-TV and Triple J.

This concert is included on the DVD and also as a bonus audio CD.

=== Track listing ===
1. "Best of Both Worlds"
2. "When the Generals Talk"
3. "Minutes to Midnight"
4. "Sleep"
5. "Only the Strong"
6. "Short Memory"
7. "Kosciuszko"
8. "US Forces"
9. "Jimmy Sharman's Boxers"
10. "Back on the Borderline"
11. "Tin-legs and Tin Mines"
12. "Don't Wanna Be the One"
13. "Power and the Passion"
14. "Read about It"
15. "Harrisburg"
16. "Stand in Line"

== Saturday Night at the Capitol ==
An incendiary show from 1982 at the Capitol Theatre, Sydney, shot for the band by award-winning filmmaker Dave Bradbury on 27 November 1982 for ABC radio station Triple J.

=== Track listing ===
1. "Only the Strong"
2. "Brave Faces"
3. "Short Memory"
4. "Knife's Edge"
5. "Power and the Passion"
6. "Armistice Day"
7. "No Time For Games"
8. "Quinella Holiday"
9. "Lucky Country"
10. "Don't Wanna Be the One"
11. "Burnie"
12. "Powderworks"

== Personnel ==
- Peter Garrett - vocals
- Peter Gifford - bass guitar, vocals
- Rob Hirst - drums, percussion, vocals
- Jim Moginie - guitars, keyboards
- Martin Rotsey - guitars

== Charts ==
Chart (2004)	Peak position
Australian DVD chart (ARIA Charts)	1

== Certifications ==
Region	Certification	Certified units/sales
Australia (ARIA)	Platinum	15,000^{^}
^{^} Shipments figures based on certification alone.
