= The Real Thing (Midnight Oil album) =

Live album by Midnight Oil
- Released: July 2000
- Recorded: (see track listing)
- Genre: Rock
- Length: 62:20
- Label: Sprint Music / Sony Music
- Producer: various / Midnight Oil

Midnight Oil chronology
Redneck Wonderland (1998)	The Real Thing (2000)	Capricornia (2001)

Singles from The Real Thing
- 1. "The Real Thing" Released: June 2000; 2. "Spirit of the Age" Released: 2000

The Real Thing is a mostly acoustic live album by Midnight Oil, which includes four additional studio recordings, among them a cover version of Russell Morris's classic "The Real Thing". It was initially issued in Australia with a bonus disk of interview material listed as containing 2 tracks ("Interview" and "Track by track") but the CD was divided into 30 tracks, dividing the interview up so that past albums and each track on "The Real Thing" gets a short discussion followed by snippet from the album or song being discussed. Later international releases had a bonus disk with videos of "Cemetery In My Mind" and "Redneck Wonderland".

Like the band's previous live album Scream in Blue, it was not included in the Full Tank box set, but three of the four studio tracks appear on the b-sides disc of the Overflow Tank box set (the fourth is included on Full Tank as part of Capricornia).

== Track listing ==
1. "The Real Thing" (Johnny Young) 3:32 (studio recording)
2. "Say Your Prayers" (Jim Moginie) 4:27 (studio recording, first released on the album Liberdade - Viva East Timor in 1999)
3. "Spirit of the Age" (Peter Garrett, Moginie) 3:11 (studio recording)
4. "Feeding Frenzy" (Garrett, Moginie) 6:02 – The Metro Theatre, Sydney (October 1994)
5. "Tell Me the Truth" (Garrett, Moginie) 3:36 – The Metro Theatre, Sydney (October 1994)
6. "The Dead Heart" (Garrett, Robert Hirst, Moginie) 6:04 – The Metro Theatre, Sydney (October 1994)
7. "Tin Legs and Tin Mines" (Garrett, Peter Gifford, Moginie, Martin Rotsey) 4:43 – The Metro Theatre, Sydney (October 1994)
8. "Short Memory" (Garrett, Hirst, Moginie) 4:53 – The Metro Theatre, Sydney (October 1994)
9. "In the Valley" (Garrett, Hirst, Moginie) 3:31 – Sony Studios NYC (April 1993) for MTV Unplugged
10. "Blue Sky Mine" (Garrett, Bones Hillman, Hirst, Moginie, Rotsey) 4:25 – The Metro Theatre, Sydney (October 1994)
11. "US Forces" (Garrett, Moginie) 4:24 – The Metro Theatre, Sydney (October 1994)
12. "Warakurna" (Moginie) 4:27 – Sony Studios NYC (April 1993) for MTV Unplugged
13. "Truganini" (Hirst, Moginie) 4:37 – Sony Studios NYC (April 1993) for MTV Unplugged
14. "The Last of the Diggers" (Hirst) 4:19 (studio recording)

== Personnel ==
=== Midnight Oil ===
- Peter Garrett - lead vocals, harmonica
- Bones Hillman - bass, vocals
- Rob Hirst - drums, vocals
- Jim Moginie - guitars, organ, harmonium, autoharp
- Martin Rotsey - guitars

=== Additional personnel ===
- Chris Abrahams - piano, organ (on all live tracks)
- Basheri - percussion (on MTV Unplugged tracks)
- Sunil de Silva - percussion (on all other live tracks)
- Charlie McMahon - Didgeridoo (on "The Dead Heart")

Horns on "Say Your Prayers":

- Stewart Kirwan - trumpet
- Andrew Bickers - tenor saxophone
- Anthony Kable - trombone

== Charts ==
Chart (2000)	Peak position
Australian Albums (ARIA)	7
