= Powderworks Records =

- Founded: 1977
- Status: liquidated
- Genre: Rock
- Country of origin: Australia
- Official website: Powderworks

Powderworks Records as Powderworks Records & Tapes Pty Limited was an Australian record label established in 1977, head-quartered in Brisbane. It was owned by members of Midnight Oil and their talent manager, Gary Morris. Aside from recording, it made the Australian pressings of works on other labels, including RCA, Columbia and Mute Records from 1978 to 1987. In February 1988 a liquidator was appointed by the Supreme Court of New South Wales.

== Background ==
The history of Powderworks Records can be traced back to M7 Records which was established in 1970. The Paul Hamlyn Record Division handled the distribution from 1971 to 1974. Tempo Record Sales handled the distribution from 1974 to 1976. Then from 1976 to 1978 the label handled its own distribution. In May 1978, M7 became 7 Records Pty Ltd and RCA Australia took over the distribution. After a management buyout in 1981, the company was renamed Powderworks Records and Tapes Pty Ltd.

== Artists and discography ==
- Coloured Stone - Human Love (1986)
- Foster and Allen – "Maggie (When You and I Were Young)" (1979)
- Lena Horne – Stormy Weather: Lena Horne's Greatest Hits (1982) (POW 3006)
- Exude
- Gondwanaland - Terra Incognita (1984), Let the Dog Out (1985) (Both later reissued through WEA)
- Midnight Oil - Midnight Oil (1978), Head Injuries (1979), Bird Noises (1980) (All later reissued through CBS)
- Outline - Maybe It's a Game (1982)
- The Radiators - Up for Grabs (1981)
- V. Spy V. Spy - Meet Us Inside (1984), Harry's Reasons? (1986) (Later reissued through WEA)
- Vanessa Amorosi - "Absolutely Everybody" (single, 2008)
- Warumpi Band – Big Name, No Blankets (1985) (POW 6098)
