= Capricornia (album) =

- Original Australian/European cover

Studio album by Midnight Oil
- Released: 2001
- Recorded: 2000–2001; Sydney
- Genre: Rock
- Length: 41:17 (Australian version); 45:49 (US version); 48:54 (European version)
- Label: Sprint/Columbia (Australia, Europe); Liquid 8/BMG (US)
- Producer: Warne Livesey

Midnight Oil chronology
The Real Thing (2000)	Capricornia (2001)	Best of Both Worlds (2004)

Singles from Capricornia
- 1. "Golden Age" Released: 2001; 2. "Too Much Sunshine" Released: 2001; 3. "Luritja Way" Released: 2002; 4. "Mosquito March" Released: 2002

Alternative cover
- US cover

Professional ratings
Review scores
Source	Rating
AllMusic	3/5 stars
The New Zealand Herald	3/4 stars
The Rolling Stone Album Guide	3/5 stars

Capricornia is the eleventh studio album by Australian band Midnight Oil, first released in 2001 by Columbia Records in both Australia/Europe, and Liquid 8 Records in the United States. It was their last studio album until 2020.

== Album history ==
=== Writing and recording ===
On the two previous albums Breathe (1996) and Redneck Wonderland (1998), all tracks were credited "Midnight Oil"; on Capricornia the band returns to crediting individual contributors for each track, with Moginie dominating the list as is seen on most of their records.

After the hard rock/electronic sounds of the previous album Redneck Wonderland, on this record Midnight Oil moved to a stripped back sound, with acoustic and clean electric guitars dominating the sound of the album (Golden Age, Luritja Way, Under the Overpass), although some tracks (Too Much Sunshine, Mosquito March, Poets and Slaves) feature significant distorted guitars. These latter tracks also feature distorted vocals. The album also features a short piano solo track (A Crocodile Cries) in the middle of the record, the melody of which is reprised for the album closing Poets and Slaves.

The album was produced, mixed and arranged by Warne Livesey, who also worked on Midnight Oil's seminal Diesel and Dust and Blue Sky Mining records. The bonus track Say Your Prayers, which appears on US versions of the album and was one of the four new tracks on The Real Thing, was produced by the band and Daniel Denholm.

=== Name and concept ===
The name and concept of Capricornia was taken from the novel of the same name written by the Australian author Xavier Herbert. The name Capricornia refers to part of the Queensland coast and inland region around Rockhampton, which is close to the Tropic of Capricorn.

== Track listing ==
=== Australian version ===
No.	Title	Writer(s)	Length
1.	"Golden Age"	Peter Garrett, Robert Hirst, Jim Moginie	3:41
2.	"Too Much Sunshine"	Moginie	3:47
3.	"Capricornia"	Hirst, Moginie	3:17
4.	"Luritja Way"	Hirst, Moginie	4:00
5.	"Tone Poem"	Garrett, Moginie	4:51
6.	"A Crocodile Cries"	Moginie	1:09
7.	"Mosquito March"	Garrett, Moginie	3:09
8.	"Been Away Too Long"	Garrett, Moginie	3:16
9.	"Under the Overpass"	Hirst, Moginie	4:02
10.	"World That I See"	Hirst, Moginie	4:08
11.	"Poets & Slaves"	Moginie	5:57

=== US version ===
No.	Title	Writer(s)	Length
9.	"Say Your Prayers"	Moginie	4:28
10.	"Under the Overpass"	Hirst, Moginie	4:07
11.	"World That I See"	Hirst, Moginie	4:11
12.	"Poets & Slaves"	Moginie	5:48

=== European version bonus tracks ===
No.	Title	Writer(s)	Length
12.	"Kiss That Girl"	Moginie	3:37
13.	"Pub with No Beer"	Gordon Parsons	4:00

== Charts ==
Chart (2002)	Peak position
Australian Albums (ARIA)	8
New Zealand Albums (RMNZ)	28

== Personnel ==
- Peter Garrett - lead vocals
- Bones Hillman - bass, vocals
- Rob Hirst - drums, vocals, percussion
- Jim Moginie - guitars, keyboards, vocals
- Martin Rotsey - guitars
- Produced By Warne Livesey, except "Say Your Prayers," produced by Midnight Oil and Daniel Denholm.
