= Redneck Wonderland =

- Original Australian cover

Studio album by Midnight Oil
- Released: July 1998
- Recorded: 1997–1998
- Genre: Hard rock; electronic rock
- Length: 47:01
- Label: Sprint Music, Columbia
- Producer: Warne Livesey, Magoo, Midnight Oil

Midnight Oil chronology
20,000 Watt R.S.L. (1997)	Redneck Wonderland (1998)	The Real Thing (2000)

Singles from Redneck Wonderland
- 1. "White Skin Black Heart" Released: 1997; 2. "Cemetery in My Mind" Released: 1998; 3. "What Goes On" Released: 1998; 4. "Redneck Wonderland" Released: 1998

Alternative cover
- US cover

Professional ratings
Review scores
Source	Rating
AllMusic	3/5 stars
Entertainment Weekly	B
Pitchfork	7.5/10
The Rolling Stone Album Guide	3.5/5 stars

Redneck Wonderland is the tenth studio album by Midnight Oil that was released in July 1998 under the Columbia Records label, which peaked at No.7 on the ARIA Albums Chart. The title of the album was inspired by a wall graffiti, a picture of which can be seen in the promotional Oil Rag Vol. VI issued along with album release. The album was certified Gold in Australia in 2014. The album's eponymous song was ranked number 93 in Triple M's "Ozzest 100", the 'most Australian' songs of all time. The album marked a shift to an electronic influenced hard rock style.

== Reception ==
Australian Musician said, "Midnight Oil are again looking into the future with an album that will startle many listeners. Utilising contemporary production techniques to achieve a brutal, dynamic and completely contemporary production sound, The Oils are striking out in a new direction once again."

== Track listing ==
Redneck Wonderland track listing
No.	Title	Writer(s)	Length
1.	"Redneck Wonderland"	Robert Hirst, Jim Moginie	3:08
2.	"Concrete"	Peter Garrett, Hirst, Moginie	4:12
3.	"Cemetery in My Mind"	Garrett, Hirst, Moginie	3:57
4.	"Comfortable Place on the Couch"	Hirst, Moginie	4:08
5.	"Safety Chain Blues"	Garrett, Moginie	4:21
6.	"Return to Sender"	Moginie	3:31
7.	"Blot"	Garrett, Hirst, Moginie	3:24
8.	"The Great Gibber Plain"	Hirst, Moginie	4:38
9.	"Seeing Is Believing"	Garrett, Hirst, Moginie	4:28
10.	"White Skin Black Heart"	Garrett, Hirst, Moginie	4:01
11.	"What Goes On"	Hirst, Moginie	3:00
12.	"Drop in the Ocean"	Moginie	4:13

Writing credits sourced from APRA WebWorks search engine, November 2009.

== Song notes ==
- "Concrete" originally performed as "Free My Soul;" known to be played on 20,000 Watt R.S.L. tour.
- "Cemetery in My Mind" known to be played on 20,000 Watt R.S.L. tour.
- "Comfortable Place on the Couch" originally performed as "Haulaway;" known to be played on 20,000 Watt R.S.L. tour.
- "Safety Chain Blues" originally performed as "Warm Babies;" known to be played on 20,000 Watt R.S.L. tour.
- "Blot" known to be played on 20,000 Watt R.S.L. tour. (video of 22 November 1997 performance)
- "White Skin Black Heart" & "What Goes On" both first released on 20,000 Watt R.S.L.; known to be played on 20,000 Watt R.S.L. tour.
- "Return to Sender", "The Great Gibber Plain" and "Drop in the Ocean" were all played on the Redneck Wonderland tour, the latter two having rare appearances in 2017 on The Great Circle Tour and "Drop in the Ocean" being part of the final concert of the final tour in 2022 (which was also the longest Midnight Oil show ever)

== The tour ==
The tour is noted for the use of a wheel featuring the titles of 64 Midnight Oil tracks. Most tracks from Redneck Wonderland were not played after the tour ended; the title track was generally the only song played, often as the opening track to shows on the Capricornia tour. The track was later placed elsewhere in the set list; "Concrete" and "Comfortable Place on the Couch" occasionally reappeared.

== Personnel ==
=== Midnight Oil ===
- Peter Garrett - lead vocals
- Bones Hillman - bass, vocals
- Rob Hirst - drums, vocals
- Jim Moginie - guitar, keyboards, synthesiser, vocals
- Martin Rotsey - guitar

=== Additional musicians ===
- Jeremy Smith (of H&C) - French horn
- Helen Mountfort - cello
- Hope Csutoros - violin

== Charts ==
Chart (1998)	Peak position
Australian Albums (ARIA)	7

== Certifications ==
Region	Certification	Certified units/sales
Australia (ARIA)	Gold	35,000^{^}
^{^} Shipments figures based on certification alone.
