= Flat Chat =

Compilation album by Midnight Oil
- Released: 14 August 2006
- Recorded: 1978–2002
- Genre: Rock
- Length: 68:25
- Label: Sony BMG

Midnight Oil chronology
Best of Both Worlds (2004)	Flat Chat (2006)	Essential Oils (2012)

Professional ratings
Review scores
Source	Rating
AllMusic	4/5 stars

Flat Chat is a compilation album from the Australian rock band, Midnight Oil. It is a collection of their heavier rock songs, which gave them their reputation. Flat Chat peaked at No. 21 on the ARIA Albums Chart.

The title is taken from a lyric in their 1982 song, "Power and the Passion". The Australian slang expression flat chat is used for "at the limit of one's powers or resources" or "working or moving as fast as possible".

Of the 18 songs included in Flat Chat, four had previously been included in Midnight Oil's compilation album 20,000 Watt R.S.L. (1997), and twelve would later be included in Midnight Oil's most comprehensive compilation album, Essential Oils (2012).

== Track listing ==
1. Only the Strong - 4:34
2. Progress - 3:57
3. Don't Wanna Be the One - 2:59
4. Dreamworld - 3:35
5. Hercules - 4:28
6. Read About It - 3:56
7. Section 5 (Bus to Bondi) - 3:00
8. Cold Cold Change - 3:29
9. Redneck Wonderland - 3:08
10. Tell Me the Truth - 4:03
11. Stand in Line - 4:48
12. Pictures - 3:13
13. Written in the Heart - 3:10
14. Mosquito March - 3:07
15. No Time for Games - 4:34
16. Best of Both Worlds - 4:04
17. Say Your Prayers - 4:25
18. Run by Night - 3:55

== Charts ==
Chart (2006)	Peak position
Australian Albums (ARIA)	21
