= Species Deceases =

EP by Midnight Oil
- Released: 26 November 1985
- Recorded: September 1985
- Studio: Paradise (Darlinghurst)
- Genre: Punk rock
- Length: 16:22
- Label: Sprint; Columbia
- Producer: Midnight Oil; François Kevorkian

Midnight Oil chronology
Red Sails in the Sunset (1984)	Species Deceases (1985)	Diesel and Dust (1987)

Species Deceases is an extended play by Australian rock band Midnight Oil, released on 26 November 1985 under the CBS record label. Debuting at No. 1 on the Australian Kent Music Report Singles Chart for six weeks from December 1985 to January 1986, it was the first Australian single and/or EP to reach the number-one spot. Its chart appearance also remains the only time Midnight Oil topped the national singles chart.

== Background and composition ==
Species Deceases was produced with Francois Kevorkian at Paradise Studios, Darlinghurst for Sprint Music and distributed by Columbia. The EP features a "rumbling punk" sound, with Ian McFarlane adding, "In terms of sheer sonic firepower, it was one of the band's hardest hitting works".

A line from the song "Blossom and Blood" appeared in the message that got flashed on infected computers by the worm WANK: "You talk of times of peace for all and then prepare for war."

== Commercial performance ==
Species Deceases was certified platinum on 14 December 1985, two weeks after its release. The following day, and six years after its release, their second album Head Injuries was certified gold. The album became a big favourite of FM Radio around the world, with all four songs enjoying frequent airplay, sometimes all of them played back-to-back.

== Track listing ==
No.	Title	Writer(s)	Length
1.	"Progress"	Jim Moginie, Peter Garrett	3:57
2.	"Hercules"	Moginie, Garrett, Robert Hirst	4:38
3.	"Blossom and Blood"	Hirst, Moginie	4:35
4.	"Pictures"	Hirst, Moginie, Garrett, Martin Rotsey, Peter Gifford	3:12
Total length:			16:22

== Charts ==
=== Weekly charts ===
Chart (1985/86)	Peak position
Australia (Kent Music Report)	1

=== Year-end charts ===
Chart (1985)	Position
Australia (Kent Music Report)	75
Chart (1986)	Position
Australia (Kent Music Report)	38

== Certifications ==
Region	Certification	Certified units/sales
Australia (ARIA)	2× Platinum	140,000^{^}
^{^} Shipments figures based on certification alone.

== Personnel ==
Midnight Oil

- Peter Garrett – lead vocals, harmonica
- Peter Gifford – bass guitar, backing vocals
- Rob Hirst – drums, backing vocals
- Jim Moginie – lead guitar, keyboards
- Martin Rotsey – lead guitar

Production work

- Producer – Midnight Oil, Francois Kevorkian
- Engineer – David Price
  - Assistant – Tom Colley
- Mixer – David Price, Midnight Oil
- Studio – Paradise Studios, Darlinghurst

Art work

- Artwork concept – Midnight Oil, Philip Ellett

Credits:
