= Red Sails in the Sunset =

"Red Sails in the Sunset" may refer to:

- Red Sails in the Sunset (album), a 1984 album by Midnight Oil
- "Red Sails in the Sunset" (song), a popular 1935 song recorded by many artists
