= Earth and Sun and Moon =

Studio album by Midnight Oil
- Released: April 1993
- Recorded: October 1992 − January 1993
- Studios: Megaphon Studios, Sydney, Australia
- Genre: Alternative rock
- Length: 54:00
- Label: Sprint / Columbia
- Producers: Nick Launay, Midnight Oil

Midnight Oil chronology
Scream in Blue (Live) (1992)	Earth and Sun and Moon (1993)	Breathe (1996)

Singles from Earth and Sun and Moon
- 1. "Truganini" Released: March 1993; 2. "My Country" Released: 1993; 3. "In the Valley" Released: 1993; 4. "Drums of Heaven" Released: 1993; 5. "Outbreak of Love" Released: 1993

Earth and Sun and Moon is the eighth studio album by Australian rock group, Midnight Oil, that was released in April 1993 under the Columbia Records label. It peaked at No.2 on the ARIA Albums Chart.

== Background ==
Midnight Oil's Earth and Sun and Moon album, produced with Nick Launay, was released in April 1993 and peaked at No. 2 on the ARIA Albums Chart, top 20 in Sweden and Switzerland, top 50 on Billboard 200, and top 30 in the UK albums chart. The single "Truganini" referenced multiple issues, including the 'last' Tasmanian Aboriginal, the treatment of indigenous artist Albert Namatjira, the Australian flag debate, and republicanism. Liner notes for the single claimed "Truganini was the sole surviving Tasmanian Aborigine, the last of her race, when she died in 1876."

The Tasmanian Aboriginal Centre, representing over 7000 contemporary Tasmanians, called for the single to be boycotted as it perpetuated a 'white' myth about the extinction of Tasmanian Aborigines. Their Native Title claims hinged upon establishing links with ancestral lands. Gary Morris, their manager, responded with, "My suggestion to these people is to stop shooting themselves in the foot and let a band like Midnight Oil voice its appeal to White Australia on behalf of Black Australia".

Critics contended that Morris disparaged Indigenous Australians' ability to represent themselves and overestimated Midnight Oil's ambassadorial powers while diminishing their errors, while some indigenous activists saw benefit in Midnight Oil's highlighting of the issues. "Truganini" released in March peaked at No. 10 on the ARIA singles charts, No. 10 on Billboard Mainstream Rock Tracks and No. 4 on their Modern Rock Tracks charts, and top 30 for the UK charts.

== Reception ==
Professional ratings
Review scores
Source	Rating
AllMusic	4.5/5 stars
Entertainment Weekly	B−
Rolling Stone	2.5/5 stars

Tom Demalon of AllMusic remarked, "If Earth and Sun and Moon isn't Midnight Oil's best effort, it's certainly close. The band still sticks to themes that are close to its heart -- the environment, native peoples, and other social causes -- but rarely has it managed to fashion an album full of songs that are as musically intoxicating."

Andrew McMillen of The Australian said, "At a time when Nirvana et al turned toward angst and distortion, the Oils opted for a bounty of rich vocal harmonies and highly melodic rock songs, including two bass-led career highlights that bookend its eighth album."

== Track listing ==
No.	Title	Writer(s)	Length
1.	"Feeding Frenzy"	Peter Garrett, Jim Moginie	5:07
2.	"My Country"	Robert Hirst	4:51
3.	"Renaissance Man"	Garrett, Moginie, Martin Rotsey	4:41
4.	"Earth and Sun and Moon"	Moginie	4:33
5.	"Truganini"	Hirst, Moginie	5:11
6.	"Bushfire"	Garrett, Moginie	4:36
7.	"Drums of Heaven"	Garrett, Hirst, Moginie	5:31
8.	"Outbreak of Love"	Hirst	5:14
9.	"In the Valley"	Garrett, Hirst, Moginie	4:41
10.	"Tell Me the Truth"	Garrett, Moginie	4:06
11.	"Now or Never Land"	Garrett, Moginie	5:22

== Charts ==
=== Weekly charts ===
Chart (1993)	Peak position
Australian Albums (ARIA)	2
Canada Top Albums/CDs (RPM)	8
German Albums (Offizielle Top 100)	72
Dutch Albums (Album Top 100)	91
New Zealand Albums (RMNZ)	5
Swedish Albums (Sverigetopplistan)	15
Swiss Albums (Schweizer Hitparade)	5
UK Albums (Official Charts)	27
US Billboard 200	49

=== Year-end charts ===
Chart (1993)	Position
Australian Albums (ARIA)	36
Canadian Albums (RPM)	67
New Zealand Albums (RMNZ)	49

== Certifications ==
Region	Certification	Certified units/sales
Australia (ARIA)	Platinum	70,000^{^}
Switzerland (IFPI Switzerland)	Gold	25,000^{^}
^{^} Shipments figures based on certification alone.

== Personnel ==
Midnight Oil

- Peter Garrett – lead vocals, harmonica
- Bones Hillman – bass guitar, vocals
- Rob Hirst – drums, vocals
- Jim Moginie – guitar, keyboards, vocals
- Martin Rotsey – guitar

Recording details

- Producer – Nick Launay, Midnight Oil
- Engineer – Brent Clark, Nick Launay
- Mastering – Tony Cousins
- Mixing – Nick Launay

Artwork

- Design – Kevin Wilkins, Craig Simmons, Midnight Oil
