= Wedding Cake Island =

Island in New South Wales, Australia

Nickname: Lemo's Island
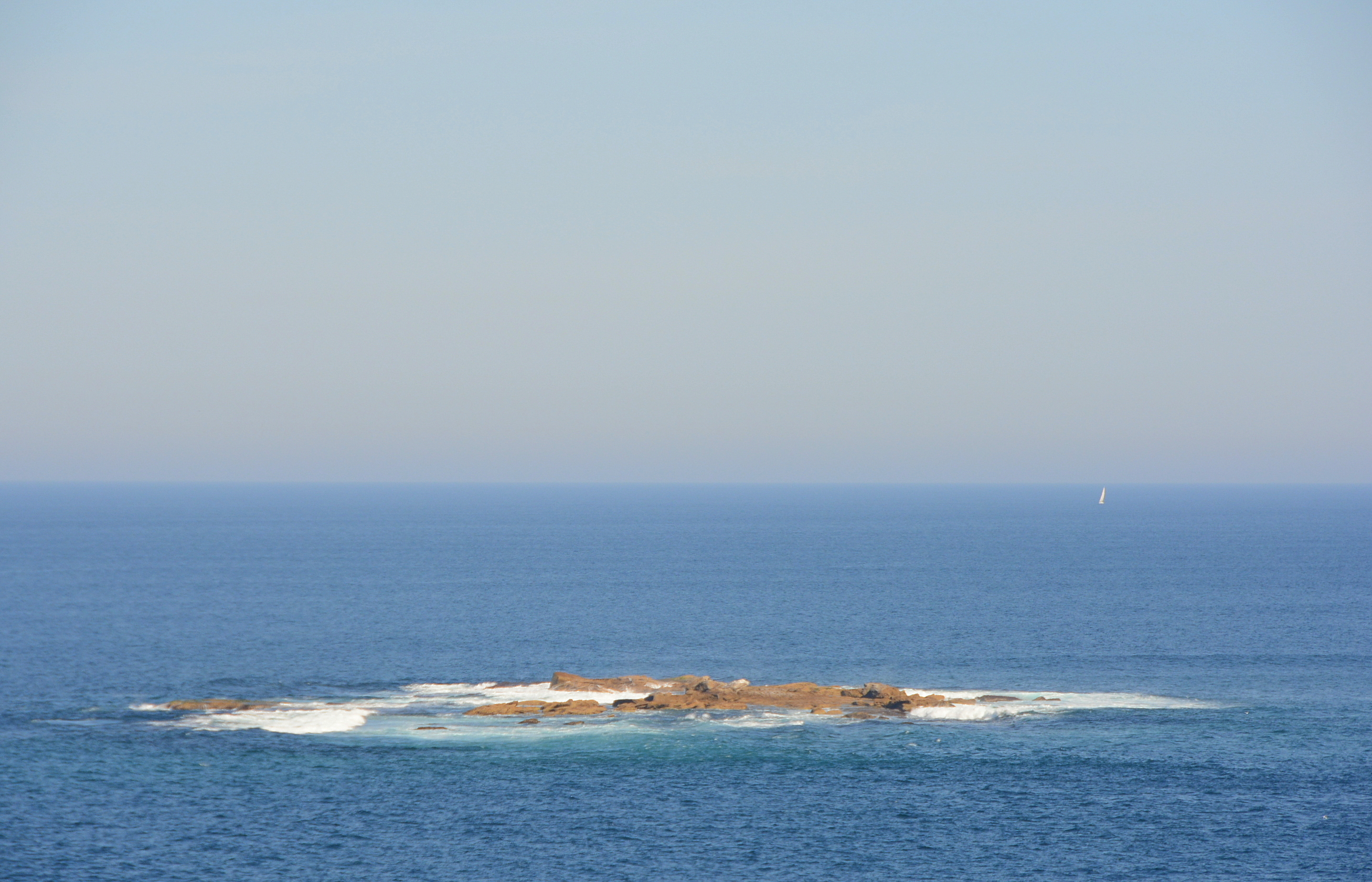
- Wedding Cake Island, Coogee Bay, in the Tasman Sea

- Location within east Sydney

Geography
- Location: Tasman Sea
- Coordinates: 33°55′33″S 151°15′55″E

Administration
- Australia

Demographics
- Population: Unpopulated

Wedding Cake Island is an island located approximately one kilometre (0.6 mi) east of Coogee Beach, Sydney, Australia in the Tasman Sea. The island protects the beach from most swells. The island is also known as Lemo's Island.

== Etymology ==
The most probable source of the name is the shape of the island - it resembles a wedding cake, particularly when the white water breaks over the island, giving the appearance of 'icing'. Another theory is that bird droppings on the island gave the appearance of icing on a cake.

== Activities ==
The island is a good scuba diving spot and also is the site of ANZAC day commemorations by the local surf community. Every year in commemoration of ANZAC day, surfers load up their surfboards and backpacks with cartons of beer and drink, and paddle out on their boards from Coogee Beach to Wedding Cake Island.

A sporting event held in November and April annually, organised by the Coogee Surf Life Saving Club, is an 2.4-kilometre (1.5 mi) swim from Coogee Beach which circumnavigates the Wedding Cake Island.

== Midnight Oil song ==
Midnight Oil recorded a namesake track for the EP Bird Noises, released in 1980. It was also covered by the Australian surf group The Atlantics on the album Delightful Rain in 2006. The Atlantics often include it as part of their live set, with Midnight Oil's blessing. Now, Australian instrumental surf rock band, The Break (which includes Midnight Oil members: drummer Rob Hirst and guitarists Jim Moginie and Martin Rotsey, Violent Femmes bassist Brian Ritchie and Hunters and Collectors trumpet player, Jack Howard) play the song regularly in their shows, being an inaugural part of Midnight Oil's history of wanting to do instrumental surf rock music.

== See also ==
- List of islands of New South Wales
