= Midnight Oil =

Australian rock band

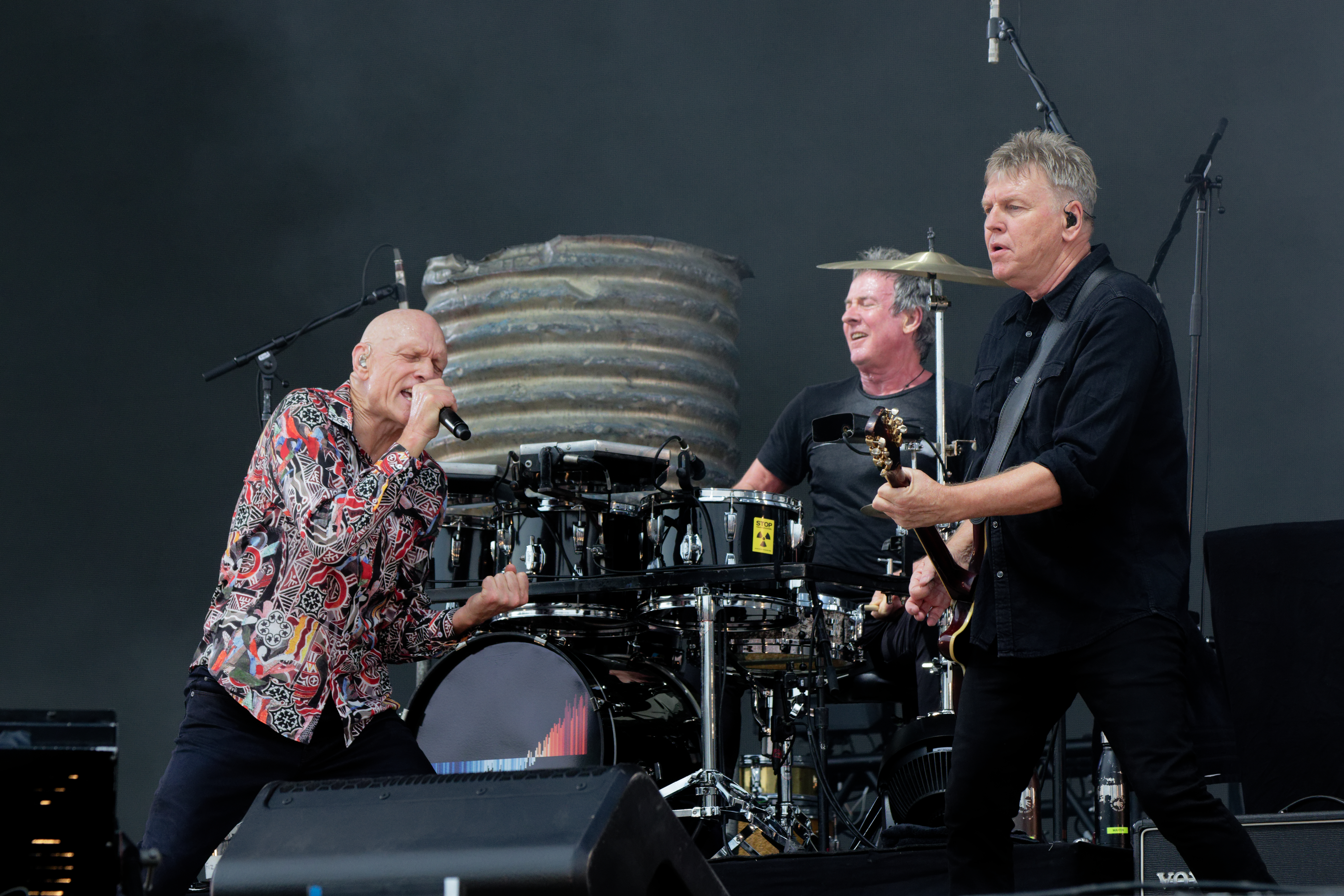
- Midnight Oil at Vieilles Charrues Festival, 2022

Background information
- Also known as: Farm (1972–1976)
- Origin: Sydney, New South Wales, Australia
- Genres: Alternative rock; hard rock; post-punk; new wave
- Years active: 1972–2002, 2016–2022 (reunions: 2005, 2009)
- Labels: Powderworks; Columbia
- Past members: Peter Garrett; Jim Moginie; Martin Rotsey; Rob Hirst; Andrew James; Peter Gifford; Bones Hillman
- Website: www.midnightoil.com

Midnight Oil (known informally as "The Oils") were an Australian rock band formed in Sydney in 1972. The band was composed of founding members Peter Garrett (vocals, harmonica), Jim Moginie (guitar, keyboard), Andrew (Bear) James (bass and vocals) Martin Rotsey (guitar) and Rob Hirst (drums and vocals); with James later being replaced by Peter Gifford (1980-1987) and later Bones Hillman (1987-2020).

Midnight Oil issued their self-titled debut album in 1978 and gained a cult following in their homeland despite a lack of mainstream media acceptance. The band achieved greater popularity throughout Australasia with the release of 10, 9, 8, 7, 6, 5, 4, 3, 2, 1 (1982) – which spawned the singles "Power and the Passion" and "US Forces" – and also began to attract an audience in the United States. They achieved their first Australian number one album in 1984 with Red Sails in the Sunset, and topped their native country's singles chart for six weeks with the EP Species Deceases (1985).

The group garnered worldwide attention with 1987 album Diesel and Dust. Its singles "The Dead Heart" and "Beds Are Burning" illuminated the plight of Indigenous Australians, with the latter charting at number one in multiple countries. Midnight Oil had continued global success with Blue Sky Mining (1990) and Earth and Sun and Moon (1993) – each buoyed by an international hit single in "Blue Sky Mine" and "Truganini", respectively – and remained a formidable album chart presence in Australia until their 2002 disbandment. The group held concerts sporadically during the remainder of the 2000s and announced a full-scale reformation in 2016. The band released their 15th and final studio album, Resist, on 18 February 2022, and announced an accompanying tour.

The band's music often broaches political subjects, and they have lent their support to multiple causes. They have won eleven ARIA Awards and were inducted into the ARIA Hall of Fame in 2006. Midnight Oil's legacy has grown since the late 1970s, with the outfit being cited as an influence, and their songs covered, by numerous popular artists. Aside from their studio output, the group are celebrated for their energetic live performances, which showcase the frenetic dancing of Garrett. Guardian writer Andrew Street described Midnight Oil as "one of Australia's most beloved bands".

== Overview ==
While studying at Australian National University in Canberra, vocalist Peter Garrett answered an advertisement for a spot in Farm, and by 1975 the band had started touring the east coast of Australia. By late 1976 Garrett had moved to Sydney to complete his law degree, and Farm changed its name to Midnight Oil by drawing the name out of a hat. The name was coined by Peter Watson, a short-term keyboard player with Farm.

Their manager Gary Morris successfully negotiated favourable contracts with tour promoters and record companies while frustrating rock journalists. Guitarist Martin Rotsey joined in 1977 and Midnight Oil, with Morris, established their own record label, Powderworks, which released their debut eponymous album in November 1978. Their first single "Run by Night" followed in December. Founding bass-guitarist James, forced to leave due to illness in 1980, was replaced by Peter Gifford. Gifford was himself replaced by Bones Hillman in 1987. Through a long career, the band became known for its driving hard-rock sound, intense live performances and political activism, particularly in aid of anti-nuclear, environmentalist and indigenous causes.

The following Midnight Oil albums peaked in the Australian Top Ten:

- 10, 9, 8, 7, 6, 5, 4, 3, 2, 1
- Red Sails in the Sunset
- Species Deceases
- Diesel and Dust
- Blue Sky Mining
- Scream in Blue (Live)
- Earth and Sun and Moon
- Breathe
- 20,000 Watt R.S.L.
- Redneck Wonderland
- The Real Thing
- Capricornia
- Flat Chat
- The Makarrata Project
- Resist

The following Midnight Oil releases peaked in the Top Ten of the Australian singles chart:

- "Power and the Passion"
- Species Deceases EP ("Progress"/"Hercules"/"Blossom and Blood"/"Pictures")
- "The Dead Heart"
- "Beds Are Burning"
- "Blue Sky Mine"

Aside from chart success, the Australasian Performing Right Association (APRA) in 2001 listed both "Power and the Passion" and "Beds Are Burning" in the Top 30 best Australian songs of all time, a chart in which Midnight Oil are the only artists to feature twice. In December 2002 Garrett announced that he would seek to further his political career and Midnight Oil disbanded, but they reformed for two warm-up shows in Canberra leading up to their performance, at one of the "Sound Relief" charity concerts, in honour of the victims of the 2009 "Black Saturday" fires in Victoria and floods in Queensland.

In 2010 their album Diesel and Dust ranked no. 1 in the book The 100 Best Australian Albums by Toby Creswell, Craig Mathieson and John O'Donnell.

== History ==
=== Farm: 1972–1976 ===
In 1971 drummer Rob Hirst, bass guitarist Andrew James, and keyboard player/lead guitarist Jim Moginie were performing together. They adopted the name "Farm" in 1972, and played covers of Cream, Creedence Clearwater Revival and Led Zeppelin songs. They placed an advert for a band member; Peter Garrett (ex-Rock Island Line) became their new vocalist and synthesizer player and began introducing progressive rock elements of Focus, Jethro Tull and Yes, as well as their own material. Garrett was studying at the Australian National University in Canberra, so Farm was only a part-time band. They played for the northern-Sydney surfing community and, by 1975, were touring the east coast. In late 1976 Garrett moved to Sydney to complete his law degree. Farm then became a full-time group and changed its name to "Midnight Oil" by drawing a name out of a hat, leaving behind "Television", "Sparta", and "Southern Cross".

The name "Midnight Oil" was inspired by the Jimi Hendrix song "Burning of the Midnight Lamp", although the word "oil" appears nowhere in the lyrics. The expression "midnight oil" first appeared in a 1635 poem by Francis Quarles (1592-1644):

To heaven's high city I direct my journey,
Whose spangled suburbs entertain mine eye.
We spend our midday sweat, our midnight oil;
We tire the night in thought, the day in toil.

— Emblems, 1635

=== 1976–1981 ===
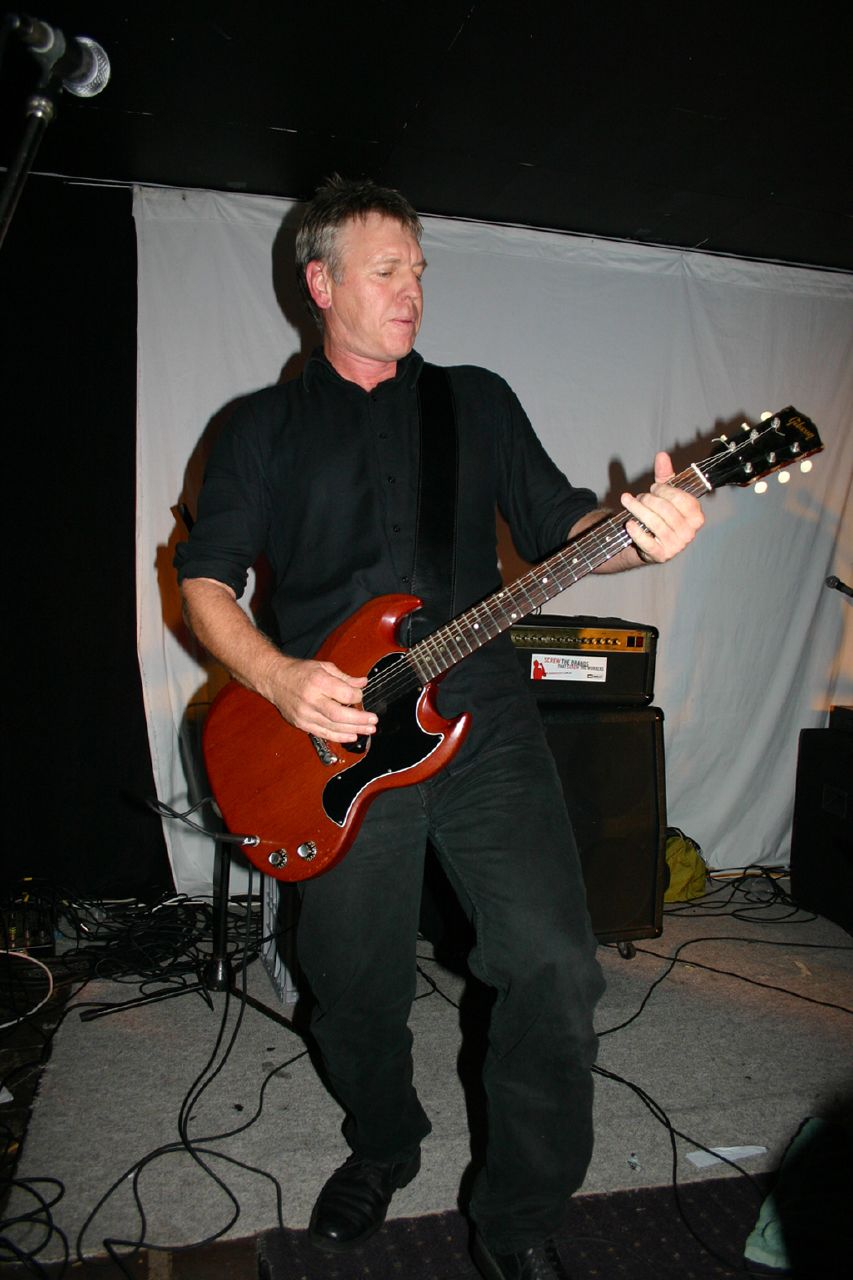
Martin Rotsey, Midnight Oil guitarist, at the Souths Leagues Club in Brisbane, 2007

After changing its name to Midnight Oil, the group began to develop an aggressive, punk-hard rock sound for their pub rock audiences. Guitarist Martin Rotsey joined in 1977 and Midnight Oil, with their manager Gary Morris, established their own record label Powderworks. In June 1978 they entered the Alberts Studio in Sydney with producer Keith Walker, from local radio station 2JJ, to record their debut eponymous album, Midnight Oil, which was released by Powderworks in November 1978 and peaked at No. 43 on the Australian albums charts. Midnight Oil's first single "Run by Night" followed in December, but had very little chart success, peaking at No. 100 on the singles charts.

The band built a dedicated fan base, initially restricted to Sydney, which was extended to other Australian cities through constant touring – performing some 200 gigs in their first year. They became known for their furious live performances, which featured the two guitarists Moginie and Rotsey, the drumming and vocals of Hirst, the bass lines of James and the presence of the towering, bald Garrett as lead singer.

The Midnight Oil LP disappointed some critics as it did not capture their powerful live performances, with undemanding playing and Garrett's vocals sounding stilted. Their second album Head Injuries, released on Powderworks in October 1979, was produced by former Supercharge member Leszek Karski. It mixed solid guitar rock with progressive flourishes and was an improvement by highlighting the group's strengths and growth. It peaked at No. 36 and by mid-1980 had achieved gold status. In April 1980 founding bass guitarist Andrew James left because of ill-health and was replaced by Peter Gifford (ex-Huntress, Ross Ryan Band).

Further interest in Midnight Oil was generated by the popular Bird Noises EP, also produced by Karski, which peaked at No. 28 on the Australian singles charts. One of its four tracks was the surf-instrumental "Wedding Cake Island" named after the rock outcrop in the ocean off Sydney's Coogee Beach. The band's third LP Place without a Postcard, released by CBS Records in November 1981, was recorded in Sussex with English producer Glyn Johns (The Rolling Stones, The Who). Creative tensions between the band and Johns plagued the recording and the group were not totally happy with the outcome. Johns had an arrangement with A&M Records and they asked Midnight Oil to return to the studio to record material suitable for an American single release – they refused and returned to Australia. Place without a Postcard peaked at No. 12 on the albums charts and related singles "Don't Wanna be the One" and "Armistice Day" reached the Top 40 in Australia.

=== Reception ===
Driven largely by commercial pressures to stay with reliable chart-toppers and teenage pop sensations, the Australian music industry in the mid-1970s cast a dismissive eye toward most bands with an alternative outlook. Although consistently championed by Sydney alternative rock station Double Jay and its FM band successor Triple J, Midnight Oil were almost totally ignored by Australia's mainstream commercial radio stations in their early career. Manager Morris developed a reputation as one of the toughest managers and became notorious for banning critics or journalists, who were usually given free admission to concerts, for writing unfavourable reviews. Writer and critic Bruce Elder, in a mid-1980s newspaper review described their music as "narrow and xenophobic" and declared Midnight Oil were:

"a kind of antipodean pub rock version of Queen [...] life-denying, sexist, secular and bigoted [...] endless touting of Australia and all things Australian"

— Bruce Elder quoted in Crème de la Phlegm: Unforgettable Australian Reviews (2006), ed.:Angela Bennie. ISBN 0-522-85241-6

In retaliation, Morris banned Elder from Oils shows permanently. Elder later recanted, describing them as the only Australian band to have developed a truly Australian sound.

The frostiness of Midnight Oil's relationship with the traditional music media quickly saw the band develop a strong "street cred" and a reputation for making no compromises with the music industry. In the early 1980s the band was scheduled to appear on an episode of the all-powerful Australian Broadcasting Corporation (ABC) TV pop show Countdown but on the day of the show they were "bumped" from the line-up. Countdown required artists to mime their songs during 'live' performances, Midnight Oil and Morris insisted they perform completely live and have their sound engineer supervising – neither side backed down. According to Countdown producer Michael Shrimpton, the band had arrived late for rehearsal and, due to the show's very tight schedule and budget, there was a strict policy that latecomers were not allowed to appear; and, as such, they were told they could not perform that day. In response, the group declared that they would never appear on the show, a promise they faithfully kept. Countdown presenter Molly Meldrum shaved his head bald, imitating Garrett, for its final show on 19 July 1987 and expressed regret that Midnight Oil had never appeared on the show.

Fans of the group were drawn to the band's "us and them" mindset, and fan loyalty to the Oils' ideas and music was fierce. Two venues at which they built significant fan bases from their early live performances were the Sydney northern beaches pub The Royal Antler at Narrabeen and the Bondi Lifesaver club near Sydney's Bondi Beach. Politically oriented rock of the style produced by the band was something of a new concept for the Australian music scene, and Peter Garrett quickly earned a reputation as one of the most charismatic and outspoken musicians in the country. He recalled that there were dangers in playing the pub scene:

You get booked into a pub or hotel, say in the western suburbs of Sydney. Halfway through your set, two large, drunk truck drivers decide to have a fight. They're beating each other up and careening towards the corner where the band is set up. Meanwhile, everyone else is going, 'Aaah, turn it down, I'm trying to watch TV.' Try to contemplate that as an environment to play music in every night for three years.

— Peter Garrett quoted in The Big Australian Rock Book (1985) published by Rolling Stone Magazine, ed.:Ed St John, ISBN 0-9590615-0-9

=== Rise to fame: 1982–1985 ===
==== 10, 9, 8, 7, 6, 5, 4, 3, 2, 1 ====
Their Australian breakthrough and first international recognition came in 1982, with the release of 10, 9, 8, 7, 6, 5, 4, 3, 2, 1, which included the singles "Power and the Passion" and "Read About It". The album peaked at No. 3 and "Power and the Passion" peaked at No. 8. The album also includes their denunciation of American military interference in foreign affairs in "US Forces" and their critique of imperialist repression in "Short Memory". 10 to 1 was recorded in London during September and produced by Englishman Nick Launay, who had previously worked with acts including The Jam, XTC, Peter Gabriel, PiL, Gang of Four and The Birthday Party. Launay worked on several other major Australian recordings in this period including INXS' The Swing, Models' The Pleasure of Your Company and The Church's Seance.

The album remained in the Australian charts for 171 weeks. It retained their live energy but was more adventurous and radical than previous work. Their ascendancy was signalled by a series of concerts on the release of the album at Sydney's Capitol Theatre, one of which was filmed and recorded and later released on their 2004 Best of Both Worlds DVD. The band also played their first shows outside Australia during this time, with the album being released in the US on Columbia Records, where it charted in 1984 on the Billboard 200; in the UK it was released on CBS.

==== Red Sails in the Sunset ====
Midnight Oil undertook more politically motivated benefit concerts, including organising the Stop The Drop nuclear disarmament concert in 1983, which received a United Nations Association of Australia Media Peace Prize. 10 to 1 was followed by Red Sails in the Sunset in October 1984, which was recorded in Japan, produced by Launay again. It peaked at No. 1 for four weeks on the Australian charts, and charted on the Billboard 200. Singles from the album were released in US and UK but had no chart success. Whilst the album showed an overreliance on technical wizardry, their lyrical stance was positive. The band continued to expand their sound and explore themes of politics, consumerism, militarism, the threat of nuclear war and environmental issues. The album cover by Japanese artist Tsunehisa Kimura featured a photomontage of Sydney – both city and harbour – cratered and devastated after a hypothetical nuclear attack. Live concert footage of "Short Memory" was used in the Australian independent anti-nuclear war movie One Night Stand. A promotional video for "Best of Both Worlds", later on Best of Both Worlds, received airplay worldwide on cable music TV station MTV.

Garrett ran as a Nuclear Disarmament Party (NDP) candidate for a New South Wales seat in the Australian Senate during the December 1984 federal election, Garrett obtained 9.6% of votes but was unable to obtain the required quota of 12.5%. In April 1985, Garrett, with some 30 other members, walked out of the national conference and resigned from the NDP claiming it had been infiltrated by a Trotskyist group. Although unsuccessful in that federal election, Garrett was now a recognised public figure.

==== Goat Island Triple J concert ====
In January 1985, Midnight Oil performed Oils on the Water, a concert on Goat Island in Sydney Harbour to celebrate Triple J's tenth birthday, before a select audience of fans who had won tickets in a radio competition. The concert was filmed, simulcast on ABC-TV and Triple J, and released on video, which was remastered for their 2004 Best of Both Worlds DVD.

=== International success and activism: 1985–2002 ===
==== Diesel and Dust ====
In December 1985 the four-track EP Species Deceases produced with Francois Kevorkian was released by CBS/Columbia; it peaked at No. 1 on the Australian singles charts for six weeks. Species Deceases, featuring the track "Hercules", featured a return to their pub rock sound with hard hitting firepower. Midnight Oil spent several months in 1986 on the Blackfella/Whitefella tour of outback Australia with indigenous groups Warumpi Band and Gondwanaland, playing to remote Aboriginal communities and seeing first hand the seriousness of the issues in health and living standards. The tour was criticised by some journalists for being a one-off event instead of a long-term attempt to build bridges between communities. The band was galvanised by the experiences and made them the basis of Diesel and Dust, released in 1987 and produced by Warne Livesey. The album focused on the need for recognition by white Australia of past injustices involving the Aboriginal nations and the need for Reconciliation in Australia. Peter Gifford left the band before the album's release due to extensive touring schedules, and was replaced by Bones Hillman, formerly of The Swingers.

Diesel and Dust peaked at No. 1 on the Australian albums charts for six weeks, No. 21 on the Billboard 200 charts in 1988, and No. 19 on the UK albums charts. "Beds Are Burning" was their biggest international hit single, peaking at No. 6 in Australia, and No. 17 on the Billboard Hot 100, No. 6 on the UK singles charts. "The Dead Heart" peaked at No. 6 in Australia, and charted on the Hot 100 and in the UK. "Put Down that Weapon" also charted in Australia, while "Dreamworld" charted on Billboard's Mainstream Rock Tracks and at No. 16 on its Modern Rock Tracks.

At the Australian Recording Industry Association (ARIA) 1988 Awards ceremony, Midnight Oil won "Best Cover Art" for Diesel and Dust and both "Best Single" and "Best Song" for "Beds Are Burning". A fracas developed between Morris, accepting awards for Midnight Oil, and former Countdown compere Ian Meldrum who was presenting: Meldrum objected to Morris making political commentary from the podium.

There were concerns about Diesel and Dust and Midnight Oil's attempts to express indigenous issues to white urban audiences – namely, the question "who holds the power to tell whose history?" The lyrics of "The Dead Heart" tell the story of colonisation from an indigenous point of view but some critics felt they reinforced the "primitive" stereotype. Use of the bullroarer was criticised as belonging to sacred rituals and therefore not appropriate for rock songs. "The Dead Heart" had been written in response to a request by organisers of the 1985 ceremony to return control of Uluru to its indigenous caretakers; Midnight Oil had originally resisted, arguing it would be more appropriate for an indigenous band to release the single. However, the organisers insisted, arguing that the band would reach a wider audience within the predominantly Caucasian urban centres. Midnight Oil requested that all royalties from the song go to indigenous communities. In addition, two indigenous groups, Warumpi Band and Gondwanaland, toured with them.

Following the 1988 American tour in support of Diesel and Dust with Australian band Yothu Yindi, Midnight Oil launched the Building Bridges – Australia Has A Black History album with various artists contributing, including Paul Kelly, Scrap Metal, Coloured Stone, Hunters & Collectors, James Reyne, The Saints, Crowded House, INXS and Yothu Yindi. All sales proceeds were donated to the National Coalition of Aboriginal Organisations.

During 1989–1993 and 1998–2002 Garrett was the President of the Australian Conservation Foundation, whilst during 1993–1998 he was on the International Board of Greenpeace. In 1990 Midnight Oil played an impromptu lunchtime set in front of Exxon headquarters in New York with a banner reading, "Midnight Oil Makes You Dance, Exxon Oil Makes Us Sick," protesting the Exxon Valdez oil spill the previous year.

==== Blue Sky Mining ====
In February 1990, Blue Sky Mining, produced by Livesey, was released by CBS/Columbia. It peaked at No. 1 on the Australian Recording Industry Association (ARIA) albums charts. It stayed at No. 1 for two weeks in Australia and had Top 5 chart success in Sweden, Switzerland and Norway. It peaked at No. 20 on the Billboard 200 and No. 28 on the UK charts. The album was more defiant and outspoken; the single "Blue Sky Mine" describes asbestos exposure in the Wittenoom mine tragedy. The single peaked at No. 8 on the ARIA singles charts, top 15 in Norway and Switzerland, No. 47 on Billboard Hot 100 and No. 1 on both their Mainstream and Modern Rock Tracks charts, and appeared on the UK charts. The second single, "Forgotten Years", was more moderately successful, reaching No. 26 on the ARIA singles chart, No. 97 in the UK, No. 11 on the Mainstream Rock Tracks, and No. 1 on the Modern Rock Tracks.

In Sydney in 1990, while Midnight Oil were taking a break, Hirst joined up with guitarist Andrew Dickson, drummer Dorland Bray of Do-Ré-Mi, guitarist Leszek Karski (Midnight Oil producer) and bass guitarist Rick Grossman of Hoodoo Gurus to form a side project called Ghostwriters. The name refers to the practice of ghostwriting, wherein famous writers contribute under assumed names in order to remain anonymous. Ghostwriters' line-ups – both live and in the studio – changed considerably through the years, with only founders Hirst and Grossman being mainstays. Between successive album releases Hirst and Grossman returned to active involvement with Oils and Gurus respectively. Ghostwriters have released Ghostwriters (1991), Second Skin (1996), Fibromoon (1999) and Political Animal (2007).

At the 1991 ARIA Awards ceremony, Midnight Oil won 'Best Group' and an 'Outstanding Achievement Award' and 'Best Cover Artist', 'Best Video' and 'Album of the Year' for Blue Sky Mining. Morris, accepting awards for Midnight Oil, was criticised for a speech lasting 20 minutes.

Scream in Blue (Live), their June 1992 live album produced by Keith Walker, contained material from concerts between 1982 and 1990, including "Progress" from their Exxon Valdez protest gig. It peaked at No. 3 on the ARIA albums charts; Top 50 in Austria, Sweden and Switzerland; and appeared on the Billboard 200.

==== Earth and Sun and Moon ====
Midnight Oil's Earth and Sun and Moon album, produced with Nick Launay, was released in April 1993 and also drew critical acclaim and international success, peaking at No. 2 on the ARIA albums charts, top 20 in Sweden and Switzerland, Top 50 on Billboard 200, and top thirty in the UK albums chart. The single "Truganini" referenced multiple issues, including the 'last' Tasmanian Aboriginal person, the treatment of Aboriginal artist Albert Namatjira, the Australian flag debate, and republicanism. Liner notes for the single claimed "Truganini was the sole surviving Tasmanian Aborigine, the last of her race, when she died in 1876." The Tasmanian Aboriginal Centre, representing over 7000 contemporary Tasmanians, called for the single to be boycotted as it perpetuated a 'white' myth about the extinction of Aboriginal Tasmanians. Their Native Title claims hinged upon establishing links with ancestral lands. Morris responded with, "My suggestion to these people is to stop shooting themselves in the foot and let a band like Midnight Oil voice its appeal to White Australia on behalf of Black Australia".

Critics contended that Morris disparaged Indigenous Australians' ability to represent themselves and overestimated Midnight Oil's ambassadorial powers while diminishing their errors, while some indigenous activists saw benefit in Midnight Oil's highlighting of the issues. Nevertheless, "Truganini" released in March peaked at No. 10 on the ARIA singles charts, No. 10 on Billboard Mainstream Rock Tracks and No. 4 on their Modern Rock Tracks charts, and top thirty for the UK charts. Peter Garrett issued an apology for the mistake in the liner notes. The band performed the song along with "My Country" from the album on the American sketch-comedy series Saturday Night Live during the 8 May 1993 episode hosted by Christina Applegate.

In 1993, the band also participated in the Another Roadside Attraction tour in Canada and collaborated with The Tragically Hip, Crash Vegas, Hothouse Flowers and Daniel Lanois on the one-off single "Land" to protest forest clearing in British Columbia.

==== Breathe to Capricornia ====
Breathe was released in 1996. It was produced by Malcolm Burn and had a loose, raw style with almost a low-key sound. It peaked at No. 3 on the ARIA albums chart, and had Top 40 success in New Zealand and Switzerland. They returned to No. 1 on the ARIA albums charts with the compilation 20,000 Watt R.S.L. in 1997 on Sony Records, which achieved 4×Platinum sales. Later album releases include the electro tinged hard rock Redneck Wonderland in 1998, live album The Real Thing in 2000 and the more stripped back Capricornia in 2002 again renuniting with producer Warne Livesey, all charted into the ARIA Top Ten.

==== Sydney 2000 Olympic Games performance ====
Midnight Oil again brought the politics of Reconciliation to the fore during their performance at the closing ceremony of the Sydney 2000 Summer Olympics. Then Prime Minister John Howard had triggered controversy that year with his refusal to embrace symbolic reconciliation and apologise to Indigenous Australians and members of the Stolen Generations. However, he had also said their reconciliation-themed single "Beds Are Burning" was his favourite Midnight Oil song. Midnight Oil performed the song at the ceremony with the word SORRY conspicuously printed on their clothes as a form of apology to Indigenous people for their suffering under white settlement and to highlight the issue to Howard, who was in the audience at the Olympic stadium as an estimated one billion people watched on television. Midnight Oil had consulted with tour mates Yothu Yindi and other Indigenous activists, so that their performance would bring popular protest to the world arena.

In 2001, when Australasian Performing Right Association (APRA) surveyed 100 music industry people for their Top 10 Best Australian songs of all time, "Beds Are Burning" was voted No. 3 behind The Easybeats' "Friday on My Mind" and Daddy Cool's "Eagle Rock". At the 2001 APRA Awards ceremony "Beds are Burning" was shown on video and introduced by Australian Democrats Senator Aden Ridgeway as an Indigenous spokesperson on Reconciliation. "Power and the Passion" was also listed in APRA's Top 30 best Australian songs.

=== Dissolution and reunion ===
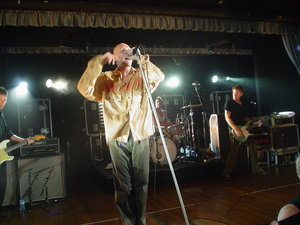
Midnight Oil at Manly Leagues Club, 2005

Garrett announced his decision to quit Midnight Oil on 2 December 2002, to refocus on his political career. In the 1984 federal election, Garrett had stood for the Australian Senate under the Nuclear Disarmament Party banner and narrowly lost. He won the seat of Kingsford Smith at the 2004 General Election for the Australian Labor Party and was selected as Shadow Minister for Climate Change, Environment, Heritage and the Arts. On Thursday, 29 November 2007, Prime Minister elect Kevin Rudd named Garrett as Minister for the Environment, Heritage and the Arts. The other members of the band continued to work together, but not under the Midnight Oil name.

After a warm up gig the previous evening at the Manly-Warringah Leagues Club, the band, including Garrett, reunited to perform at the WaveAid concert on 29 January 2005 to raise funds for the victims of the 26 December 2004 Indian Ocean tsunami. The concert, which took place at the Sydney Cricket Ground, also included performances by Powderfinger, Silverchair, Nick Cave, John Butler Trio, Finn Brothers, and others.

On 29 October 2006, Midnight Oil was inducted into the ARIA Hall of Fame with ARIA chairman Denis Handlin describing them:

For 30 years, on their journey from inside Sydney's Royal Antler Hotel to outside the Exxon Building in New York, the Oils have always led from the front. They spoke to us – and to the world – in a uniquely Australian way. [...] Their music speaks first – it's powerful, it's uncompromising, it's unique rock music that inspires, entertains and will last forever. [...] My favourite Oils lyric, which summarises it all is: 'It's better to die on your feet than live on your knees.'

— Denis Handlin, 2006

Rob Hirst, in his acceptance speech, thanked his family, bandmates, and support from fellow Australians. He also lamented the fact that unlike the Vietnam war, which had inspired some of the best protest songs ever written, very few had been written in reaction to the invasion of Iraq.

Flat Chat, another compilation album, was released in November 2006 and peaked at No. 21 on the ARIA album charts. Rumours of an appearance by Midnight Oil at the Sydney leg of the Live Earth concert in July 2007 were false. However Ghostwriters, founded by drummer Hirst and Hoodoo Gurus bass guitarist Rick Grossman and including former Oils guitarist Martin Rotsey, performed six tracks including the Oils' song "When the Generals Talk", whilst Peter Garrett gave a speech introducing a reformed Crowded House.

Aside from Ghostwriters, Hirst has also been a member of Backsliders, performed with former Olympian Paul Greene, with fellow Backsliders member Dom Turner on The Angry Tradesmen, and, with Rotsey, assisted on Jim Moginie's solo album Alas Folkloric in 2006.

=== 2009 reformation ===
On the evenings of 12 and 13 March 2009 a reformed Midnight Oil, with Garrett, played at the Royal Theatre in Canberra. The following day, 14 March they headlined the Sound Relief concert in Melbourne. This event was held at the Melbourne Cricket Ground (MCG) to raise money for victims of Victoria's February bushfire disaster. The event was held simultaneously with a concert at the Sydney Cricket Ground. All proceeds from the Melbourne Concert went to the Red Cross Victorian Bushfire relief. Appearing with Midnight Oil in Melbourne were Augie March, Bliss N Eso with Paris Wells, Gabriella Cilmi, Hunters & Collectors, Jack Johnson, Kasey Chambers & Shane Nicholson with Troy Cassar-Daley, Kings of Leon, Liam Finn, Crowded House, Jet, Paul Kelly, Split Enz and Wolfmother.

=== Reunion, the Great Circle Tour, Midnight Oil: 1984 and Armistice Day ===
On 4 May 2016 it was announced on the band's website that Midnight Oil intended to reform and embark on a tour in 2017 (their first concerts in Australia since 2002 and their first world tour since 1997). Such plans were confirmed in February 2017, when the band announced The Great Circle Tour, which kicked off in April. After three warm up concerts in their native Australia, the band toured Brazil, the U.S., Canada, Europe, South Africa, Singapore and New Zealand before going back to play a series of concerts around the whole of Australia. The band performed 77 concerts in 16 countries during the tour.

In March 2018, the band announced the release of a new documentary film entitled Midnight Oil: 1984. Directed by Ray Argall, the film primarily consists of previously-unseen footage from the band's tour in support of Red Sails in the Sunset. The film was given an Australian cinematic release in May 2018, an Australian DVD/Blu-ray release the following July and a limited North American and New Zealand cinematic release that August.

One of the Great Circle tour's final concerts was held on Armistice Day at The Domain, in Sydney on 11 November 2017. Both shows at the Domain (the band also performed there on 17 November) were filmed and recorded, being turned into the live album and film Armistice Day: Live at the Domain, Sydney. The film was given a one-night cinematic release on 24 October 2018. On 9 November 2018, Armistice Day was released as a live album, as well as on DVD and Blu-ray.

In December 2018, the band announced a European and UK tour for June and July 2019. The band were also announced as the headlining act of the Big Red Bash festival, taking place in Birdsville, Queensland. In April 2019, the band announced headlining shows in Thirroul and Canberra as warm-up shows for their European tour. With the announcement came news that the band intended to record new material for a projected 2020 release.

=== 2020: The Makarrata Project and "Gadigal Land" ===
On 7 August 2020, Midnight Oil released their first song in 18 years titled "Gadigal Land", with all earnings going to organisations promoting the Uluru Statement from the Heart. The song featured poetry spoken in the Gadigal language. It is the first song from a mini-album titled The Makarrata Project, whose name is related to one of the elements of the Uluru Statement, a Yolngu word approximating a peace agreement or type of treaty. "Gadigal Land" peaked at number 5 on the Australian digital sales song chart.

The Makarrata Project was released on 30 October 2020 and reached Number 1 in the Australian albums chart on 6 November 2020.

Bass guitarist Bones Hillman died on 7 November 2020 of cancer at his home in the United States. The surviving members of Midnight Oil announced Hillman's death in a statement that remembered him as "the bassist with the beautiful voice, the band member with the wicked sense of humour, and our brilliant musical comrade."

=== 2021–2022: Resist and final tour ===
On 18 May 2021, Midnight Oil announced on Twitter that their thirteenth album, with the working title Show of Hands, was scheduled for release during their performance at the 2021 Byron Bay Bluesfest. As the event was cancelled in mid-August and the majority of lineup was confirmed for the 2022 edition (set to 14 April), the band's plans to release the album remained undefined for some six months.

On 28 October 2021, the band released on YouTube a video for their first single from the album, "Rising Seas". They announced the single on Twitter: "The uncompromising song, released on the eve of [the United Nations Climate Change Conference] (COP26), adds the band's unique voice to billions of others around the world seeking a safe, habitable, and fair future for our planet." The band featured no bassist in the video, leaving only a bass guitar in a stand in the background beside the drums as a tribute to Hillman.

On 26 November 2021, the band officially announced the album Resist, which was released 18 February 2022. With the announcement of the album came the release of national Australian tour dates for 2022, which the band confirmed would be their last, while simultaneously confirming that the band will continue to make music together in the future. Resist: The Final Tour concluded on 3 October 2022 at the Hordern Pavilion in Sydney with a 40-song, three-and-a-half-hour set from the band.

2024 saw the release of Paul Clarke's documentary on the band Midnight Oil: The Hardest Line.

On 20 January 2026, it was revealed that Hirst had died at the age of 70.

== Legacy ==
Midnight Oil initially faced resistance from the mainstream media, but went on to sell over 20 million albums. They were inducted into the ARIA Hall of Fame in 2006, having won 11 ARIA Awards during their career. AllMusic noted that the band "brought a new sense of political and social immediacy to pop music", and were "inspirational and successful in their homeland", while critic Bernard Zuel wrote, "It's been said of Midnight Oil that 'this is what Australia sounds like'." Author Tim Winton remarked, "It was almost too much to believe that rock music could be about anything but itself. You know: life on the road and the inconvenience of VD. Dicks and chicks. Faux Americana. Finally someone was playing stuff that was musically idiosyncratic, fresh and strong. And authentic." Spin founder Bob Guccione Jr. said of Midnight Oil, "If they were from New Jersey they'd be bigger than U2." Guardian writer Andrew Street called them "one of Australia's most beloved bands".

The group have influenced international acts such as Green Day, R.E.M., Pearl Jam, Garbage, The Cranberries, Biffy Clyro, Candlebox, Maná, Hot Water Music and Shades Apart, as well as Australian performers like Crowded House, Powderfinger, The Living End, John Butler, DMA's and Tim Freedman. R.E.M. frontman Michael Stipe described Peter Garrett as a "brilliant" songwriter who is "able to imagine a situation, put [himself] into it and write about it", adding, "That, to me, is incredible". Crowded House singer Neil Finn went on to have multiple collaborations with Jim Moginie, whom he called "a great guy and an amazing guitar player". Biffy Clyro vocalist Simon Neil said of Midnight Oil, "Every night for about three weeks, driving home from the studio I would just put 'Beds Are Burning' on, just on loop... They're a really underrated band." The Living End founder Chris Cheney reported that his ensemble listened to "a lot of [Midnight Oil's] 10, 9, 8, 7, 6, 5, 4, 3, 2, 1 and Red Sails in the Sunset, and were blown away by their fearlessness in not being shackled to a style". The group have also inspired artists outside the realm of popular music, including poet Daniel Nester and painter Nicholas Harding.

Midnight Oil's songs have been covered by performers such as Pearl Jam (and frontman Eddie Vedder solo), U2, Patti Smith, The Killers, Imagine Dragons, Silverchair, Tom Morello (as The Nightwatchman), Billy Bragg and Anti-Flag. U2 singer Bono recorded a speech for Midnight Oil's ARIA Hall of Fame induction, sections of which aired intermittently. He recited the chorus lyrics of their song "Forgotten Years" and hailed the outfit as an "extraordinary" band whose music "brought people's differences together; not to resolve them, just to get them in the same room, up each other's noses". Killers vocalist Brandon Flowers said, "I wish I'd written 'Forgotten Years'... That song touches my heart." Midnight Oil's music is the subject of 2001 tribute album The Power & The Passion, which features covers by several mainstream rock acts from Australia and New Zealand, including Something for Kate, Regurgitator, Grinspoon, Jebediah, Augie March and Shihad. In 2009, a version of "Beds Are Burning" was recorded by numerous musicians – among them Duran Duran, Lily Allen, Bob Geldof, Fergie, Mark Ronson and Scorpions – in protest of global warming and climate change.

Music journalist Kurt Loder once noted that Midnight Oil were "reputed to be Australia's most formidable live act"; Tomas Mureika in AllMusic argued they were "the tightest band on the planet for a time". Writer John O'Donnell said that the group's performances "quickly became the stuff of legend and earned the band a large and fiercely loyal following". Cold Chisel singer Jimmy Barnes called them "one of the greatest bands ever and one of my favourite live bands in the world". The Smashing Pumpkins frontman Billy Corgan referred to the 2016 announcement of Midnight Oil's impending reformation as "awesome news", noting that they are "one of the greatest live bands I've ever seen". Corgan had previously likened his dancing to that of Peter Garrett. Garrett's onstage routine – described by critic Richard McGregor as "mesmerising" – incorporates a wild and eccentric dance style; Guardian journalist Andrew Stafford wrote that Garrett has a "unique dance step that captivated audiences for over 20 years" prior to the group's 2002 disbandment. His dancing was imitated in Parliament by Australian politicians Peter Costello and John Elferink.

== Band members ==
Members

- Peter Garrett – lead vocals, harmonica (1976–2002, 2005, 2009, 2016–2022)
- Jim Moginie – guitars, keyboards, backing vocals (1976–2002, 2005, 2009, 2016–2022)
- Martin Rotsey – guitars (1977–2002, 2005, 2009, 2016–2022)
- Rob Hirst – drums, backing and occasional lead vocals (1976–2002, 2005, 2009, 2016–2022; died 2026)
- Andrew James – bass (1976–1980), backing vocals (1979–1980)
- Peter Gifford – bass, backing vocals (1980–1987)
- Bones Hillman – bass, backing vocals (1987–2002, 2005, 2009, 2016–2020; died 2020)

Touring musicians

- Charlie McMahon – didgeridoo (1984, 1986)
- Glad Reed – trombone (1985–1990, 2009)
- Chris Abrahams – keyboards (1993–1994, 2000)
- Jack Howard – trumpet, flugelhorn, keyboards, percussion (2017)
- Andy Bickers – saxophone (2019, 2021–2022)
- Adam Ventoura – bass, backing vocals (2021–2022)
- Leah Flanagan – backing vocals (2021–2022)
- Liz Stringer – backing vocals, acoustic guitar (2021–2022)

== Discography ==
Studio albums

- Midnight Oil (1978)
- Head Injuries (1979)
- Place without a Postcard (1981)
- 10, 9, 8, 7, 6, 5, 4, 3, 2, 1 (1982)
- Red Sails in the Sunset (1984)
- Diesel and Dust (1987)
- Blue Sky Mining (1990)
- Earth and Sun and Moon (1993)
- Breathe (1996)
- Redneck Wonderland (1998)
- Capricornia (2001)
- The Makarrata Project (2020)
- Resist (2022)

== Awards and nominations ==
=== APRA Awards ===
These annual awards were established by Australasian Performing Right Association (APRA) in 1982 to honour the achievements of songwriters and music composers and to recognise their song writing skills, sales and airplay performance, by its members annually. From 1982 to 1990, the best songs were given the Gold Award (also called the Special Award).

Year	Nominee / work	Award	Result
1989–90	"Beds Are Burning" (Peter Garrett, Robert Hirst, James Moginie)	Gold Award	Won
2001	"Beds Are Burning" (Garrett, Hirst, Moginie)	APRA Top 10 Australian songs	No. 3
2001	"Power and the Passion" (Hirst, Moginie, Garrett)	APRA Top 30 Australian songs	11–30
2018	Midnight Oil (Garrett, Hirst, Martin Rotsey, Moginie, Bones Hillman	Ted Albert Award for Outstanding Services to Australian Music	Won
2021	"Gadigal Land" (Joel Davison, Rob Hirst, Bunna Lawrie)	Song of the Year	Won
2022	"First Nation"	Song of the Year	Nominated
2023	"Rising Seas"	Song of the Year	Shortlisted
2023	"Rising Seas"	Most Performed Rock Work	Nominated

=== ARIA Music Awards ===
The ARIA Music Awards are an annual set of awards, commenced in 1987, which recognise excellence, innovation, and achievement across all genres of Australian music. Midnight Oil have received 11 wins from 38 nominations.

Year	Nominee / work	Award	Result
1987	"The Dead Heart"	Best Group	Nominated
1988	"Beds Are Burning"	Single of the Year	Won
1988	"Beds Are Burning" (Peter Garrett, Rob Hirst, Jim Moginie)	Song of the Year	Won
1988	Midnight Oil	Best Group	Nominated
1988	Diesel and Dust	Best Indigenous Release	Nominated
1988	Diesel and Dust – Ken Duncan, Creative Type Wart, Gary Morris, Midnight Oil	Best Cover Art	Won
1989	"Dreamworld"	Best Group	Nominated
1989	"Dreamworld"	Best Indigenous Release	Nominated
1989	"Dreamworld" – Guy Gray	Engineer of the Year	Nominated
1989	"Dreamworld" – Andrew de Groot	Best Video	Nominated
1991	Blue Sky Mining	Album of the Year	Won
1991	Blue Sky Mining	Best Group	Won
1991	Blue Sky Mining – Livingstone Clarke	Best Cover Art	Won
1991	"Blue Sky Mine"	Single of the Year	Nominated
1991	"Blue Sky Mine" (Hirst, Moginie, Garrett, Martin Rotsey, Bones Hillman)	Song of the Year	Nominated
1991	"Blue Sky Mine" – Claudia Castle	Best Video	Won
1991	Midnight Oil – David Nicholas	Engineer of the Year	Won
1991	Midnight Oil	Outstanding Achievement	Won
1993	Scream in Blue – Midnight Oil, Neo One Design	Best Cover Art	Nominated
1994	Earth and Sun and Moon	Best Group	Nominated
1994	Earth and Sun and Moon – Kevin Wilkins, Midnight Oil	Best Cover Art	Nominated
1994	"Outbreak of Love" – Paul Elliott	Best Video	Nominated
1998	20,000 Watt R.S.L.	Highest Selling Album	Nominated
1998	20,000 Watt R.S.L. – Kevin Wilkins	Best Cover Art	Nominated
1998	"White Skin / Black Heart" – Magoo	Engineer of the Year	Won
1999	Redneck Wonderland – Magoo	Engineer of the Year	Nominated
2004	Best of Both Worlds	Best Music DVD	Won
2006	Midnight Oil	Hall of Fame	Inducted
2017	The Overflow Tank – Mitchell Storck	Best Cover Art	Nominated
2019	Armistice Day	Best Rock Album	Nominated
2019	Midnight Oil	Best Australian Live Act	Nominated
2021	The Makarrata Project	Album of the Year	Nominated
2021	The Makarrata Project	Best Rock Album	Nominated
2021	The Makarrata Project	Best Group	Nominated
2021	Robert Hambling for Midnight Oil – "First Nation"	Best Video	Nominated
2021	Makarrata Live	Best Australian Live Act	Nominated
2022	Resist	Best Group	Nominated
2022	Resist. The Final Tour 2022	Best Australian Live Act	Nominated

=== Countdown Australian Music Awards ===
Countdown was an Australian pop music TV series on national broadcaster ABC-TV from 1974 to 1987; it presented music awards from 1979 to 1987, initially in conjunction with magazine TV Week. The TV Week / Countdown Awards were a combination of popular-voted and peer-voted awards.

Year	Nominee / work	Award	Result
1981	Themselves	Most Consistent Live Act	Nominated
1982	10, 9, 8, 7, 6, 5, 4, 3, 2, 1	Best Australian Album	Nominated
1983	"Power and the Passion"	Best Australian Single	Won
1983	"Power and the Passion"	Best Promotional Video	Nominated
1984	Red Sails in the Sunset	Best Australian Album	Nominated
1984	"Read About It"	Best Group Performance in a Video	Nominated
1984	"Short Memory" – Peter Garrett (Midnight Oil)	Best Male Performance in a Video	Nominated
1984	Themselves	Most Popular Australian Group	Nominated
1986	"The Dead Heart"	Best Australian Single	Nominated

=== Environmental Music Prize ===
The Environmental Music Prize is a quest to find a theme song to inspire action on climate and conservation. It commenced in 2022.

Year	Nominee / work	Award	Result	Ref.
2023	"Rising Seas"	Environmental Music Prize	Nominated	

=== Helpmann Awards ===
The Helpmann Awards is an awards show, celebrating live entertainment and performing arts in Australia, presented by industry group Live Performance Australia since 2001. Note: 2020 and 2021 were cancelled due to the COVID-19 pandemic.

Year	Nominee / work	Award	Result	Ref.
2005	Midnight Oil - WaveAid - the Tsunami Relief Concert	Best Performance in an Australian Contemporary Concert	Nominated	
2018	Midnight Oil - The Great Circle World Tour 2017	Best Australian Contemporary Concert	Nominated	

=== J Awards ===
The J Awards are an annual series of Australian music awards that were established by the Australian Broadcasting Corporation's youth-focused radio station Triple J. They commenced in 2005.

Year	Nominee / work	Award	Result	Ref.
2022	Midnight Oil	Double J Artist of the Year	Won	

=== Mo Awards ===
The Australian Entertainment Mo Awards (commonly known informally as the Mo Awards), were annual Australian entertainment industry awards. They recognise achievements in live entertainment in Australia from 1975 to 2016. Midnight Oil won two awards in that time.

Year	Nominee / work	Award	Result (wins only)
1990	Midnight Oil	Rock Group of the Year	Won
1990	Midnight Oil	Rock Performer of the Year	Won
