= Bird Noises =

EP by Midnight Oil
- Released: 24 November 1980
- Recorded: 21–22 July 1980
- Studio: Music Farm Studio (Byron Bay)
- Genre: Post-punk
- Length: 15:17
- Label: Powderworks, Sprint Music, CBS/Columbia
- Producer: Leszek Karski

Midnight Oil chronology
Head Injuries (1979)	Bird Noises (1980)	Place Without a Postcard (1981)

Bird Noises is the first extended play by Australian rock group, Midnight Oil, which was released on 24 November 1980 under the band's own independent label, Powderworks Records / Sprint Music. It was produced by Leszek Karski and manufactured and distributed by CBS/Columbia. Bird Noises reached the Top 30 on the Australian Kent Music Report Singles Chart.

== Background ==
On 24 November 1980, Australian rock music group, Midnight Oil, released their first four-track extended play, Bird Noises. At the time Midnight Oil consisted of Peter Garrett on lead vocals and harmonica; Peter Gifford on bass guitar and backing vocals; Rob Hirst on drums and backing vocals; Jim Moginie on lead guitar and keyboards; and Martin Rotsey on lead guitar. It was the first recording by the band to feature Gifford who had replaced the band's earlier bass guitarist, Andrew James.

It was produced by former Supercharge band member Leszek Karski for Powderworks Records and Sprint Music label at Music Farm Studios in Byron Bay, and mixed by Christo Curtis at StudioB, Studios301, Sydney NSW, and distributed internationally by the CBS/Columbia Records. The track, "Wedding Cake Island", refers to the island of the same name off Coogee Beach, Sydney. In 1990 the EP was re-released, on CD, in the United States by Columbia Records.

== Reception ==
Professional ratings
Review scores
Source	Rating
AllMusic	3/5 stars

Bird Noises peaked at No. 28 on the Australian Kent Music Report Singles Chart. According to Australian musicologist, Ian McFarlane, Bird Noises "continued the development heard on Head Injuries, with 'No Time for Games' and 'I'm the Cure' being particularly impressive. Bird Noises also boasted the anomalous, but delightful Shadows-like instrumental 'Wedding Cake Island'". AllMusic's William Ruhlman noted the group had tried "some musical variations after two albums of hard rock ... the music in fact was restrained, and the group tried acoustic instruments and a moody instrumental for an intriguing change of pace from their usual style".

== Track listing ==
All tracks are written by Peter Garrett, Robert Hirst, Jim Moginie, and Martin Rotsey

No.	Title	Writer(s)	Length
1.	"No Time for Games"	Hirst, Moginie	4:34
2.	"Knife's Edge"	Garrett, Rotsey, Moginie	3:39
3.	"Wedding Cake Island"	Rotsey, Moginie	3:16
4.	"I'm the Cure"	Moginie	3:48
Total length:			15:17

== Charts ==
Chart (1980/81)	Peak position
Australian Kent Music Report	28

== Certifications ==
Region	Certification	Certified units/sales
Australia (ARIA)	Gold	35,000^{^}
^{^} Shipments figures based on certification alone.

== Personnel ==
=== Midnight Oil ===
- Peter Garrett – lead vocals, harmonica
- Peter Gifford – bass guitar, backing vocals
- Rob Hirst – drums, backing vocals
- Jim Moginie – lead guitar, keyboards
- Martin Rotsey – lead guitar

=== Production work ===
- Producer – Leszek Karski (for Instant Relief)
- Engineer – Ross Cockle
- Mixer – Leszek Karski, Christo Curtis
- Studio – Music Farm Studio, Byron Bay; mixed at Studios 301, Sydney.

Credits:
