= Breathe (Midnight Oil album) =

Studio album by Midnight Oil
- Released: 15 October 1996
- Recorded: May – June 1996
- Studios: Darling Harbour Studios, Sydney; Kingsway Studios, New Orleans
- Genre: Alternative rock
- Length: 51:29
- Label: Sprint / CBS
- Producer: Malcolm Burn

Midnight Oil chronology
Earth and Sun and Moon (1993)	Breathe (1996)	20,000 Watt R.S.L. (1997)

Singles from Breathe
- 1. "Underwater" Released: August 1996; 2. "Surf's Up Tonight" Released: November 1996

Breathe is the ninth studio album by Australian rock band, Midnight Oil, which was released on 15 October 1996 under the Columbia Records label. It peaked at No. 3 on the ARIA Albums Chart and appeared in the top 40 on the New Zealand and Swiss Albums Charts. The album was produced by Malcolm Burn and according to Australian musicologist, Ian McFarlane, it had a loose, raw style with almost a low-key sound.

== Background ==
Australian rock band, Midnight Oil, released their ninth studio album, Breathe, on 15 October 1996, which appeared three-and-a-half years after their eighth album, Earth and Sun and Moon. The line-up for the album was Peter Garrett on lead vocals, Bones Hillman on bass guitar and vocals, Rob Hirst on drums and vocals, Jim Moginie on guitars, keyboards, and vocals, and Martin Rotsey on guitars. The album was produced by Malcolm Burn and released for Sprint Music by Columbia Records.

Moginie later said, "Breathe was supposed to be an atmospheric, spiritual album - and I think we succeeded in doing that. I really enjoyed making that album - and I learnt an incredible amount in doing it." Hirst added, "we set out to make an album that was literally the five of us playing, that would be timeless in the sense that there's no little production gimmicks or manufactured sounds that would tag it to a particular era. You'd just hear the music."

== Reception ==
Professional ratings
Review scores
Source	Rating
AllMusic	3/5 stars
Rolling Stone	3.5/5 stars

Breathe peaked at No. 3 on the ARIA Albums Chart and appeared in the top 40 on the New Zealand and Swiss Albums Charts. In Australia it was certified gold for shipment of 35,000 copies by ARIA. AllMusic's reviewer, Stephen Thomas Erlewine, described it as having "a more direct sound while keeping the anthemic melodicism ... less ambitious than its predecessor, yet also more forceful". According to Australian musicologist, Ian McFarlane, it had a loose, raw style with almost a low-key sound. Rolling Stone's Tom Moon compared it to earlier albums which "were filled with wide-screen screeds, the lectures on Breathe are offset by evocative mood pieces ... In fusing the hurtling momentum of punk with the righteousness of old-timey hymns, the Oils have arrived at a potent music that uplifts as it agitates".

== Track listing ==
Breathe track listing
No.	Title	Writer(s)	Length
1.	"Underwater"	Peter Garrett, Bones Hillman, Robert Hirst, Jim Moginie, Martin Rotsey	5:02
2.	"Surf's Up Tonight"	Garrett, Moginie	3:05
3.	"Common Ground"	Garrett, Moginie	4:26
4.	"Time to Heal"	Garrett, Moginie	3:54
5.	"Sins of Omission"	Garrett, Hillman, Hirst, Moginie, Rotsey, Malcolm Burn	4:35
6.	"One Too Many Times"	Moginie	3:27
7.	"Star of Hope"	Moginie	4:57
8.	"In the Rain"	Garrett	2:28
9.	"Bring on the Change"	Garrett, Moginie	3:50
10.	"Home" (featuring Emmylou Harris)	Garrett, Moginie	4:29
11.	"E-Beat"	Garrett, Moginie	4:32
12.	"Barest Degree"	Hillman, Hirst	3:09
13.	"Gravelrash"	Garrett, Hillman, Hirst, Moginie, Rotsey	3:27

== Personnel ==
=== Midnight Oil ===
- Peter Garrett – lead vocals
- Bones Hillman – bass, vocals
- Rob Hirst – drums, vocals
- Jim Moginie – guitars, keyboards, vocals
- Martin Rotsey – guitars

=== Guest musicians ===
- Malcolm Burn – guitars, organ, bass
- Emmylou Harris – vocals
- Buddy Miller – guitars
- Daryl Johnson – Djembe
- Ethan Allan – piano

== Charts ==
Chart (1996)	Peak position
Australian Albums (ARIA)	3
Canada Top Albums/CDs (RPM)	32
German Albums (Offizielle Top 100)	33
New Zealand Albums (RMNZ)	26
Swiss Albums (Schweizer Hitparade)	31
US Billboard 200	155

== Certifications ==
Region	Certification	Certified units/sales
Australia (ARIA)	Gold	35,000^{^}
^{^} Shipments figures based on certification alone.
