= Midnight Oil (Midnight Oil album) =

Studio album by Midnight Oil
- Released: 1 November 1978
- Recorded: June 1978
- Studio: Albert (Sydney)
- Genre: Post-punk; progressive rock
- Length: 33:59
- Label: Powderworks/Sprint
- Producer: Keith Walker

Midnight Oil chronology
Midnight Oil (1978)	Head Injuries (1979)

Singles from Midnight Oil
- 1. "Run by Night" Released: November 1978

Midnight Oil is the debut album by Australian rock band Midnight Oil which was released in November 1978 on the band's independent Powderworks label. It reached the top 50 on the Australian Kent Music Report Albums Chart. The album was later distributed by CBS Records and issued as a CD. The LP has a blue cover, however, the CD has a black cover. Because of the blue cover, the former version is often referred to, by fans, as the "blue album" or "the Blue Meanie". The lead single, "Run by Night", became the band's first minor hit in Australia and appeared on the Kent Music Report Singles Chart Top 100. It also had a video clip.

== Background ==
Midnight Oil is the debut album by the Australian rock group of the same name. In late 1976, the line-up of Peter Garrett on vocals and synthesiser, Rob Hirst on drums, Andrew James on bass guitar and Jim Moginie on keyboards and lead guitar were performing together in Sydney as the progressive and surf rock group, Farm. They changed their name to Midnight Oil and began to develop an aggressive, punk-hard rock sound for their pub rock audiences. Guitarist Martin Rotsey joined in 1977 and Midnight Oil, with their manager Gary Morris, established their own record label Powderworks.

In June 1978 they entered the Alberts Studio in Sydney with producer Keith Walker, from local radio station 2JJ, to record their debut eponymous album, Midnight Oil, which was released by Powderworks in November 1978 and peaked at No. 43 on the Australian Kent Music Report Albums Chart. Midnight Oil's first single "Run by Night" followed in December, but had very little chart success peaking at No. 100 on the related singles chart.

The band built a dedicated fan base, initially restricted to Sydney, which was extended to other Australian cities through constant touring – performing some 200 gigs in their first year. They became known for their furious live performances, which featured the two guitarists Moginie and Rotsey, the drumming and vocals of Hirst and the presence of the towering, bald Garrett as lead singer. The Midnight Oil LP disappointed some critics as it did not capture their powerful live performances, with undemanding playing and Garrett's vocals sounding stilted.

== Recording ==
In his autobiography, Moginie said the studio "consisted of white rendered walls with a big mirror along one wall. There was no acoustical treatment, just a small living-room sized rectangle. Rob was at the far end of the room. Bear was across from me. Martin had his amp in another room at the end of a long lead, but was right next to me. Pete was in another room, singing along. The recording was pure joy.

== Reception ==
Reviewed in Australian Rolling Stone, by Richard McGregor, it was described as, "a reasonably accurate showcase for the talents of the band, and as such it emphasises all the strengths and weaknesses. The main problem seems to be Peter Garrett's voice. Stripped of the menace of his mesmerising onstage presence, it often sounds fragile". McGregor noted that, "Midnight Oil's strength is in the kinetic energy of their playing" and described them as "an authentic Sydney band, unlike The Angels, Cold Chisel, and Dragon".

Professional ratings
Review scores
Source	Rating
AllMusic	3/5 stars
The Rolling Stone Album Guide	3/5 stars

== Track listing ==
Side one
No.	Title	Writer(s)	Length
1.	"Powderworks"	Robert Hirst, Andrew James, Jim Moginie, Martin Rotsey	5:35
2.	"Head Over Heels"	Hirst, Moginie, Rotsey	4:08
3.	"Dust"	Peter Garrett, Hirst, Moginie	3:21
4.	"Used and Abused"	Hirst, Moginie	3:13

Side two
No.	Title	Writer(s)	Length
5.	"Surfing With a Spoon"	Garrett, Hirst, Moginie, Rotsey	5:23
6.	"Run by Night"	Hirst, Moginie, Rotsey	3:59
7.	"Nothing Lost – Nothing Gained"	Moginie	8:31

== Charts ==
Chart (1978/79)	Peak position
Australian Kent Music Report	43

== Certifications and sales ==
Region	Certification	Certified units/sales
Australia (ARIA)	2× Platinum	100,000^{^}
^{^} Shipments figures based on certification alone.

== Personnel ==
Midnight Oil

- Peter Garrett – lead vocals
- Rob Hirst – drums, vocals
- Andrew James – bass guitar
- Jim Moginie – guitar, keyboards
- Martin Rotsey – guitar

Recording details

- Producer – Keith Walker
- Engineer – Keith Walker
- Studios – Albert Studios (recorded, mixed), 139 King Street, Sydney NSW 2000

Art works

- Design – Jan Paul, Midnight Oil (sleeve & cover)
- Photography – Kathleen O'Brien, Kevin Fewster; Jan Paul (back cover)
