= Supercharge (band) =

English rock band

Supercharge are an English rock band from Liverpool, founded by singer/saxophonist Albie Donnelly and drummer Dave Irving. In 1977, the band had a number three hit single in Australia with "You've Gotta Get Up and Dance".

== History ==
=== Beginnings and Australian success ===
Founded in early 1974, by Liverpool tenor-saxophonist, Albie Donnelly (born Albert Edward Donnelly, 12 August 1947, Huyton, Liverpool), and drummer Dave Irving (born David Geddes Irving, 18 November 1946, Crosby, Liverpool) after they had both left the 'In Crowd' cabaret band, Supercharge soon built up quite a cult following in Liverpool at 'The Sportsman', a popular city-centre pub on Sunday and later Monday nights and also at the 'Dove and Olive' at Speke.

Original members included Donnelly (bandleader, vocalist, and tenor saxophonist), Ozzie Yue (guitar/vocals) (born Austin J Yue, 12 August 1947, Liverpool), Allen 'Gaz' Gaskell (tenor sax, guitar, harmonica, and vocals), Alan Peters (trumpet), Bob Robertson (baritone sax), Pete Newton (bass guitar), Tony Dunmore (bass) and Dave Irving (drums).

Supercharge also quickly established themselves as a major player on the UK college / university circuit. Their first album Between Music and Madness, which was locally produced, soon followed.

Around 1975, in an attempt to attract a major record label offer, Supercharge began to gig regularly on the London live circuit at venues such as the Hope and Anchor, Islington, the Nashville Rooms, and the Marquee Club. As a result, Supercharge were soon signed by Virgin Records, and with the company's new record producer, Robert "Mutt" Lange, they had a number three hit in Australia with their 1976 single "You've Gotta Get Up and Dance". Personnel on these recordings also included organist Iain Bradshaw. It was also in Australia that their first album, Local Lads Make Good went gold - resulting in a number of successful major tours with a version of the band that included Les Karski on guitar.

These live UK gigs often featured celebrated live sound engineer Chrys Lindop, and included the infamous comedy track 'She Moved The Dishes First', which Donnelly claims they wrote so they could mess about a bit while the band were replacing broken guitar strings. This track also achieved notoriety when it was picked up and played regularly by Radio Caroline.

Meanwhile, back in the UK, although their record sales were disappointing, Supercharge still managed to achieve a reputation as one of the UK's best live bands. This included Supercharge's opening set for Queen at the 1976 Hyde Park Festival. However, it was becoming clear to Donnelly that Virgin did not really know what to do with them, and they eventually parted company sometime during the punk era.

Despite their reputation as a killer band live, Richard Branson decided that after two albums without major success that he would only offer Donnelly / Karski a continuous deal. The rest of the band became redundant, and ironically months later the Local Lads album went gold in Australia. However, the deed had been done, and Donnelly resorted to taking a scratch band to do the hit tour in Australia much to the chagrin of the original guys who had put all the hard studio and roadwork in to get the band where it was.

=== Success in Europe ===
The next chapter in Supercharge's history was the invasion of Europe, which began at the end of the 1970s-early 1980s. By now the band also featured Andy Parker on vocals and saxophone. Other members (at one time or another) included Mike Snow - trumpet; Dick Hansen - trumpet; John Burke - trumpet Tony Winders - guitar; Phil Loughran - guitar; Tony Judge - piano; Steve Snow - trombone; Paul Ambrosius - bass/vocals; Dave Dover - bass; Kenny Shearer - bass; Dave 'The Frug' Hormbrey - drums; Tony Lunney - drums.

Albums during this period included Body Rhythm (1979), Now Jump (1980), and King Size (1982). Body Rhythm featured a track written (and sung) by Supercharge's producer, "Mutt" Lange, called "We Both Believe in Love", which later became the Huey Lewis & the News Top-10 hit "Do You Believe in Love".

In late 1983, the Liverpool band Juke (Allen 'Gaz' Gaskell - tenor saxophone, guitar, harmonica, bass, vocals; Mickey Kearns - baritone sax; guitar; vocals; Bob Hardy - bandleader, keyboards, guitar, vocals; Dave Sheppley - guitar, bass, vocals; Paddy Chambers - guitar, vocals; Steve Grant - drums, vocal) struck a deal with Donnelly and his then manager, "Memo" Rhein, to work together for the next twelve months as Supercharge '84. This version of the band was so successful that at the end of 1984, Donnelly and Rhein persuaded them to stay on for a further five months.

During the time that Juke and Donnelly were together they managed to clock up well over 200 gigs. Many of these were for Europe's 'Jet-Set', and included the wedding of Tina Onassis (which resulted in the 1984 album Groovers In Paris - which is still Supercharge's top selling rhythm and blues album). Gigs also included parties for Gunter Sachs at the Dracula' Club in St. Moritz; and a New Year's Eve party in Marbella for Adnan Khashoggi.

=== Mid-1980s ===
The next version of Supercharge began performing live in mid-1985, and moved away from the successful horn driven 'Rhythm and Blues-Maximum Show' format of Supercharge '84, and instead featured material written mainly by guitarist/vocalist Colin Frost and pianist Tony Judge. This version of the band also included bassist Brendan O'Connor.

In 1986/7, guitarist Dave Shepley (who had been a member of Juke and had switched to bass in Supercharge '84) and guitarist/vocalist John "Fat Ted" Lewis helped Donnelly to once again convert Supercharge into a major player on the late 1980s and early 1990s European Jazz and Rhythm and Blues live-scene.

This powerhouse rhythm and blues version of Supercharge (which at various times included Andy Parker on vocals and tenor saxophone, Steve Snow and Paul Latham on trombone, Dick Hansen and Tony Peers on trumpet, Graham Price and Paul Hetherington on bass, John "Fat Ted" Lewis on guitar and vocals, Roy "The Boy" Herrington, Dave Sheppley and Terry Kennaugh on guitar, Lenni Zaksen on tenor saxophone, Mal Bowers on keyboards and Tony Lunney on drums) quickly began to pick up a number of major tours with artists such as Chuck Berry and B.B. King, and this soon took the band back to stadiums and bigger concert hall gigs, where they still perform.

Nashville keyboard-player and vocalist Greg Barrett joined in the late 1980s and demonstrated a more soulful side of Supercharge. This version of the band usually included Greg Barrett on keyboards and vocals, Albie Donnelly on tenor saxophone, Paul Owens on baritone saxophone, Dick Hansen on trumpet, Roy "The Boy" Herrington on guitar, Wolfgang "Bolle" Diekmann on bass and Tony Lunney on drums.

Donnelly also began experimenting with smaller outfits around this time, the most popular being Albie Donnelly's Big Three which included Gregory Gaynair on piano and Wolfgang Diekmann on bass.

=== 2000s–present ===
Since 2000 to date, Donnelly has been fronting an R&B band, with a version of Supercharge that now consists mainly of a number of German R&B musicians, including Jürgen Wieching on saxophone, Mike Rafalczyk on trombone and Wolfgang Diekmann on bass.

Donnelly also featured on a CD, Return Cargo. In addition to Supercharge regulars, the recording also features the original Supercharge drummer, Dave Irving.

Over the years Donnelly has been an official endorser for a number of saxophone companies, including Keilwerth and Yamaha; he has also provided a great deal of regular work for a number of Liverpool's top musicians.

Since 2010, the band's line-up has been Albie Donnelly (alto and tenor saxophones, lead vocals), Roy Herrington (guitar, vocals), Jürgen Wieching (baritone and alto saxophones), Mike Rafalcyk (trombone, harmonica), Sascha Kühn (keyboards), Wolfgang Diekmann (bass) and Uwe Petersen (drums); with Ozzie Yue (guitars), Lance Donnelly (drums), Neil Partington (guitars) and Mark Phillips (guitars).

Allen 'Gaz' Gaskell has since gone on to form Merseyside-based sextet "Jazz Junction".

The band had tour dates for Germany in June 2022.

== Discography ==
=== Albums ===
1. Between Music And Madness (Stag, 1974)
2. Local Lads Make Good (Virgin PZ34293, 1976) #10 AUS
3. Horizontal Refreshment (Virgin PZ34429, 1977) #77 AUS
4. I Think I'm Going To Fall (In Love) (Virgin 2999, 1978)#50 AUS
5. Body Rhythm (Virgin 12118, 1979)
6. Now Jump (Criminal Records/Intercord, 1979)
7. The Best of Supercharge (Virgin, 1983)
8. Groovers In Paris - Live At Tina Onassis' Wedding At Maxim's Paris (Memo Music, 1984)
9. King Size (Criminal Records/Intercord)
10. Update - Live In Munich (Memo Music, 1986)
11. Bad, Mad & Dangerous (Memo Music, 1987)
12. Take That (Audiostax, 1988)
13. Full Power (Rockport, 1990)
14. Live At The Schlachthof (Filou, 1992)
15. Live & Loaded (suum cuique, 2001)
16. New (CD JJCD005, 2002)
17. 2CD Big Blow (recorded in the 1990s), (MeMe Records, 2005)

All Virgin albums were produced by Robert John "Mutt" Lange.

=== Singles ===
1. "Get Down Boogie" (1974, Virgin VS 134)
2. "Give It To Nasty" (1975, Virgin ZS8 9507)
3. "Only You" (1975, Virgin ZS8 9511)
4. "Lonely and In Love" (1976 Virgin VS 145)
5. "Limbo Love" / "Skid Markos (Live)" (1977 Virgin VS 178)
6. "(You've Gotta) Get Up and Dance" (1977, #3 AUS) from the album Local Lads Made Good
7. "I Think I'm Gonna Fall (In Love)" #13 AUS
8. "I Can See Right Through You" / "Version 2" (Virgin VS243, 1979)
9. "Cool Jerk" / "Red Dress" (Criminal SWAG 11) (1979)

=== Other ===
1. 4 by 6 (EP, Virgin, VEP 1001, 1976)
