= Peter Gifford =

Australian musician

- Also known as: Giffo
- Born: 6 April 1955 (age 70); Australia
- Genres: Rock
- Occupation: Musician
- Instrument(s): Bass guitar, chapman stick, backing vocals
- Years active: 1980–1987
- Labels: Powderworks, Sprint Music, CBS/Columbia

Peter Gifford (born 6 April 1955), sometimes known as "Giffo," is an Australian musician. From 1980 until 1987, he played bass guitar, Chapman Stick and sang backing vocals for Australian rock band Midnight Oil.

== Midnight Oil ==
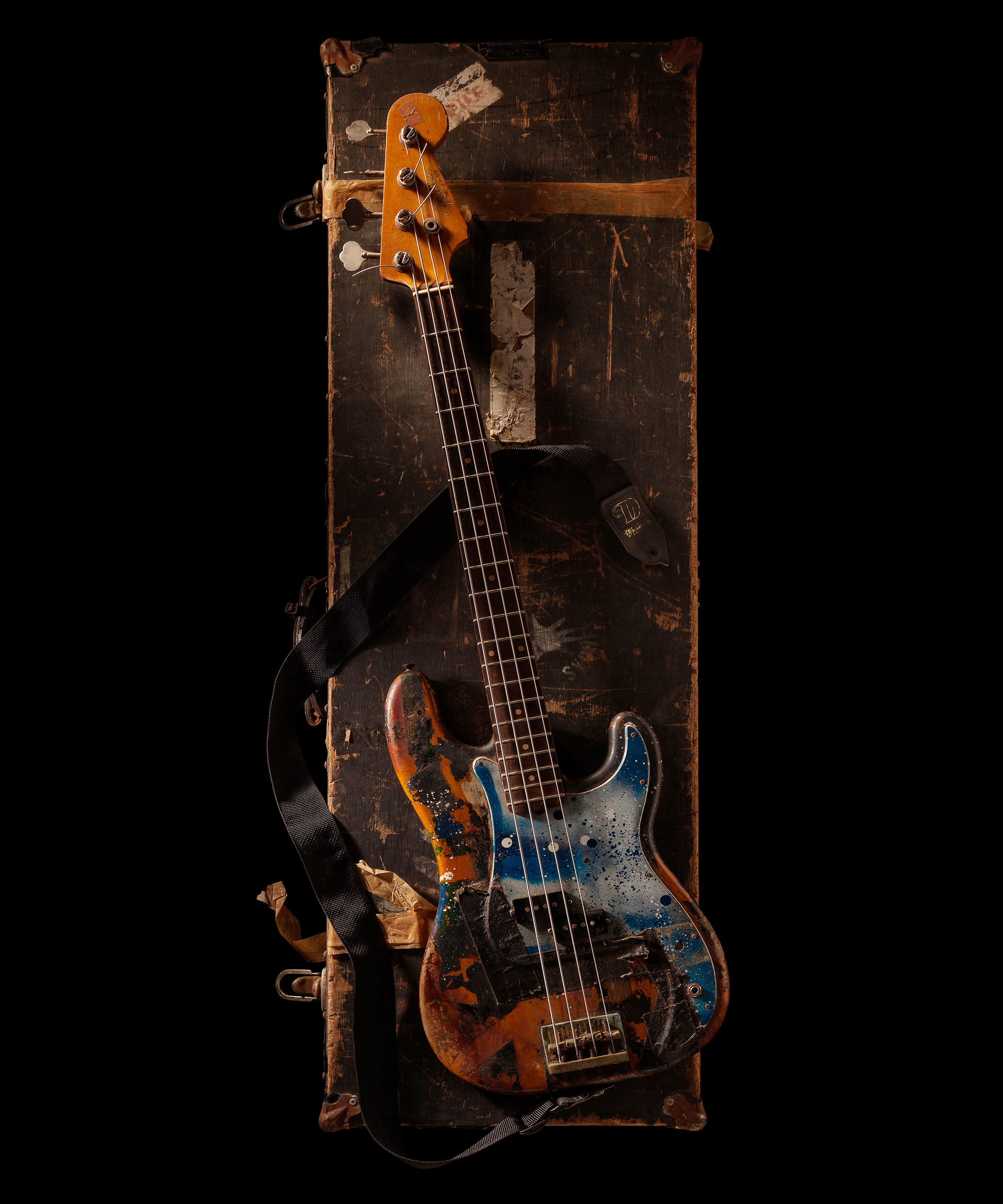
Gifford's Fender Precision Bass

Gifford is credited with creating a significant part of the Oils' tight, driving sound, and has been described as being an aggressive bass guitarist. He played on the albums Place without a Postcard (1981), 10, 9, 8, 7, 6, 5, 4, 3, 2, 1 (1982), Red Sails in the Sunset (1984) and Diesel and Dust (1987), as well the EPs Bird Noises (1980) and Species Deceases (1985).

Gifford joined the band in 1980 after hearing on the radio about the auditions for a replacement for bassist Andrew James, whose poor health required him to withdraw from the band. He was actually driving over the Sydney Harbour Bridge to work as a roadie at the time. The band was looking for a more aggressive style of bass playing (an 'animal' in the words of guitarist Jim Moginie).

Gifford predominantly played a Fender Precision Bass guitar and this can be seen in the Oils on the Water concert, performed on Goat Island in 1985. His bass solo work in live performances of "Stand in Line" was his signature. He also played the Chapman Stick on the tracks "Sleep" and "Who Can Stand in the Way" on the Red Sails in the Sunset album, and in concert. Gifford provided many backing vocals for the band, and is credited by longtime producer Nick Launay as being a significant contributor in the recording studio.

In 1987, he left the group, for personal reasons. He was later replaced by Bones Hillman.

== Discography ==
=== With Midnight Oil ===
==== Studio albums ====
- Place without a Postcard (1981)
- 10, 9, 8, 7, 6, 5, 4, 3, 2, 1 (1982)
- Red Sails in the Sunset (1984)
- Diesel and Dust (1987)

==== Extended plays ====
- Bird Noises (1980)
- Species Deceases (1985)
- The Dead Heart (1986)

==== Live albums ====
- Scream in Blue (1992), tracks 1, 4, 5, and 12
- Best of Both Worlds (2004)

=== With Warumpi Band ===
- Go Bush (1987)

=== With Neil Murray (Australian musician) ===
- Calm and Crystal Clear (1989), tracks 1, 2, 3 4, 6 and 8
- These Hands (1993), track 1

== Business interests ==
After leaving the band, Gifford started the Byron Bay-based Wicked Weasel, a direct marketing business specialising in micro bikinis and short shorts. The company has built an international reputation for female swimwear and underwear. In early 2016, he sold all his interests in Wicked Weasel and related entities.
