= Bones Hillman =

New Zealand musician (1958–2020)

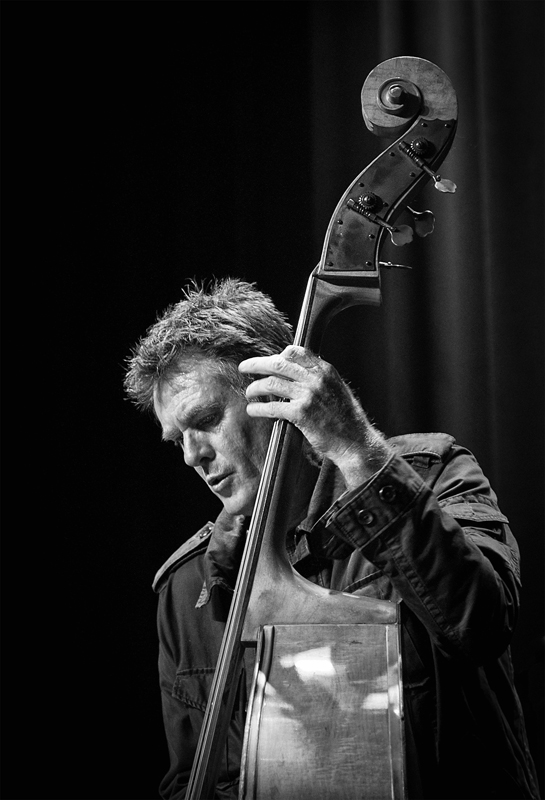
- Hillman in 2011

Background information
- Also known as: Dwayne Hillman
- Born: Wayne Stevens; 7 May 1958; New Zealand
- Died: 7 November 2020 (aged 62) Milwaukee, Wisconsin, United States
- Occupation: Bassist
- Formerly of: The Swingers, Midnight Oil

Wayne Stevens (7 May 1958 – 7 November 2020), known by the stage name Bones Hillman, was a New Zealand musician best known as the bass guitarist for the Australian rock band Midnight Oil, which he joined in 1987 and remained with until his death in 2020.

== Career ==
Hillman played bass guitar in his first band the Masochists, an early New Zealand punk act, formed with Kevin Grey (vocals), Spike Nasty (drums) and Jimmy Sex (guitar), from the Auckland suburb of Avondale. They were alternatively known as The Metal Masochists, MM, Vandals, and The Avondale Spiders. In late 1977 he joined the Suburban Reptiles and appeared on their first single, "Megaton" (Vertigo, 1978). The name Hillman was coined by the make of car he drove. He left the band in early 1978 and joined the former Masochists in the Rednecks, a mainstay of the legendary Zwines punk scene in Auckland.

In late 1979, Hillman joined the New Zealand band the Swingers with Phil Judd (ex-Split Enz) and Mark Hough (a.k.a. Buster Stiggs, ex-Suburban Reptiles). Their single "Counting the Beat" was a trans-Tasman number one hit before the band disintegrated in 1983. He appeared in the 1982 film Starstruck, as one of the Swingers. He was credited as Dwayne Hillman.

Moving to Australia as part of The Swingers in 1980 and living there until 2002, Hillman was a member of internationally known Australian rock band Midnight Oil, replacing Peter Gifford in 1987 as bass player.

During the hiatus of Midnight Oil, Hillman returned to New Zealand, working as a studio and live musician with Dave Dobbyn and recorded the album Available Light. Hillman moved with his family to Nashville, Tennessee, in early 2007 to participate in the more active musical scene there.

In 2009, Hillman recorded albums for Anne McCue (Broken Promise Land) and Elizabeth Cook (Welder, produced by Don Was). Two years later he worked on the Musical adaptation of Diner, recording tracks for Sheryl Crow. In 2014, Hillman reunited with Midnight Oil producer Warne Livesey to record songs for his new musical project the Graysmiths. The following year, Hillman recorded and toured with Matthew Good.

In 2017, Hillman participated in a Midnight Oil reunion and tour.

== Death ==
Hillman died on 7 November 2020 in Milwaukee, Wisconsin, from cancer at the age of 62. Hillman had kept his bandmates unaware of his health problems until very shortly before his death, according to an interview with Midnight Oil's drummer Rob Hirst shortly after Hillman's death.
