= Martin Rotsey =

Australian guitarist

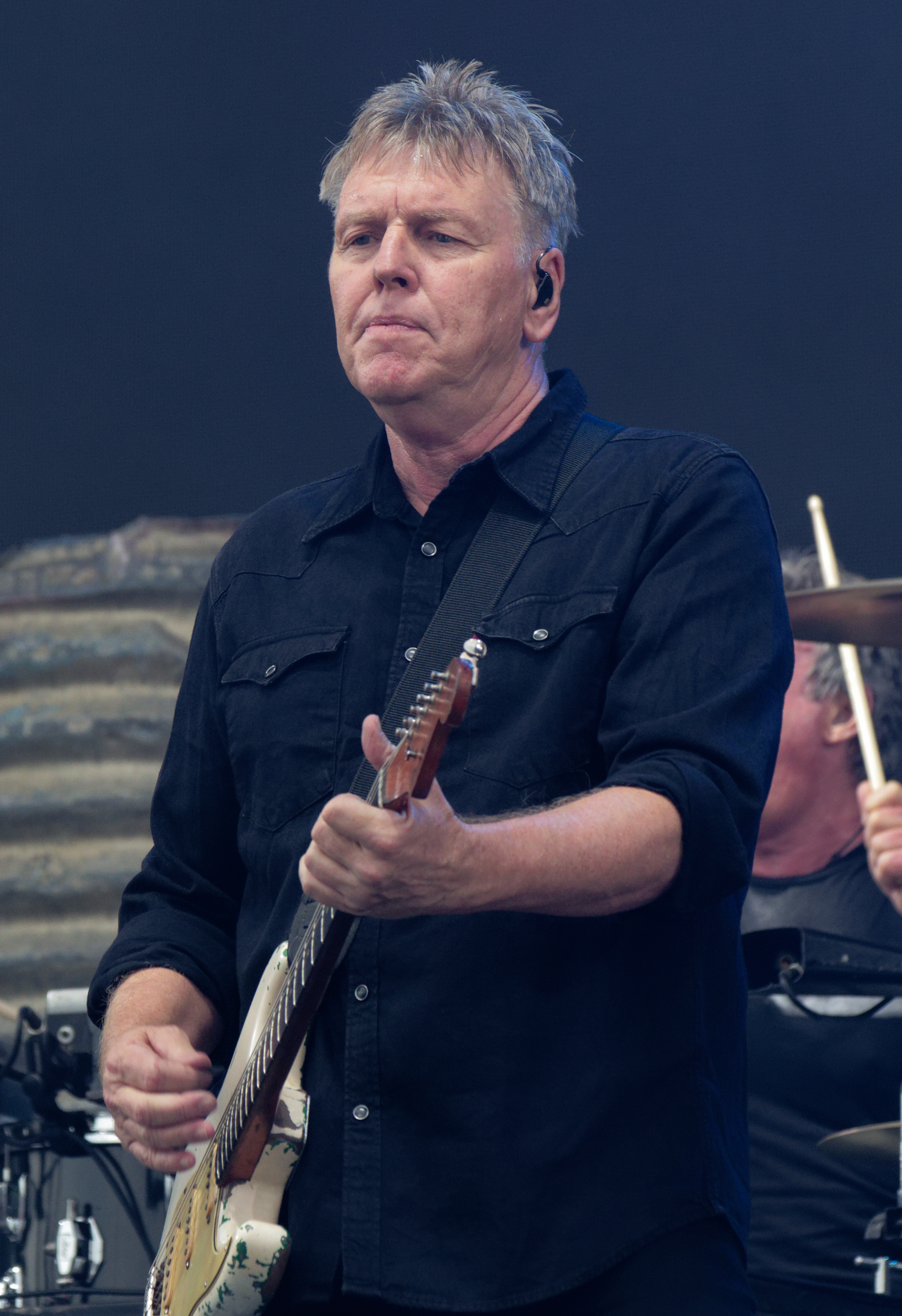
- Rotsey in 2022

Background information
- Born: February 19, 1956 (age 69); Sydney, Australia
- Genres: Rock, alternative rock
- Occupation: Guitarist
- Years active: 1977–2002, 2006–present
- Website: midnightoil.com

Martin Rotsey is an Australian guitarist and a member of the rock band Midnight Oil, which was active from 1977 to 2002 and resumed performing in 2017.

== Career ==
In 2006, he joined fellow Midnight Oil member Rob Hirst's projects Ghostwriters and The Angry Tradesmen. He is also featured – together with Hirst – on the track "Around the world" from fellow Midnight Oil guitarist Jim Moginie's solo debut album "Alas Folkloric".

In 2010 Rotsey teamed up with two other former members of Midnight Oil, Hirst and Moginie, and Violent Femmes bass player Brian Ritchie to form a new surf rock band, The Break. Their debut album Church of the Open Sky was released on 16 April 2010 on the independent label Bombora, distributed by MGM. A tour of Australia followed.
