= Midnight Oil discography =

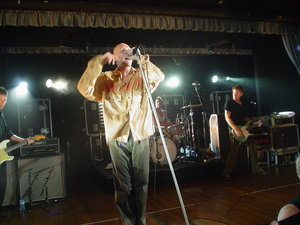
- The Oils at Manly Leagues Club in 2005
- Studio albums: 13
- Extended plays: 2
- Live albums: 7
- Compilation albums: 6
- Singles: 43
- Video albums: 5
- Music videos: 38

The discography of Australian rock group Midnight Oil consists of thirteen studio albums, forty-three singles, two EPs, five video albums, seven live albums, and six compilation albums. The band has sold over 20 million albums.

Midnight Oil began under the name Farm in 1972, establishing their own record label 'Powderworks' in 1977. They released their debut self-titled album Midnight Oil in 1978 along with their first single "Run by Night". Their first three albums charted in the top 50 of the Australian Kent Music Report; in Australia, Head Injuries was certified gold and Place without a Postcard was certified platinum.

Their fourth album was their first to reach the top 10; 10, 9, 8, 7, 6, 5, 4, 3, 2, 1 (1982) peaked at number three in Australia pushing them to the level of mainstream recognition locally. It also brought their first appearance on the United States charts, peaking at number 178 on the Billboard 200. The album's first single, "Power and the Passion", was their first top ten single in Australia, at number eight. In 1984, Midnight Oil's Red Sails in the Sunset became their first number one album in Australia. It was the first of four in a row between 1984 and 1993. 1985 saw the release of the EP Species Deceases – the group's only number one entry on the Australian singles chart – which features the anti-war song "Hercules" and the environmentalist anthem "Pictures".

"The Dead Heart" in 1986 became the band's highest-charting Australian single, peaking at number four. It was followed by "Beds Are Burning" at number six, with both singles from the 1987 album Diesel and Dust which edged them into mainstream global recognition. In addition to number one in Australia, Diesel and Dust peaked at number 20 on the United Kingdom Albums Chart; it was certified platinum in the US and three times platinum in Canada. Midnight Oil followed up the success of Diesel and Dust with their seventh studio album Blue Sky Mining in 1990. It was their first and only to peak in the top 20 of the Billboard 200. It brought the single "Blue Sky Mine", which charted at number one on both the US Mainstream and Modern Rock charts. The second single "Forgotten Years" also charted at number one on the Modern Rock chart. Their last Australian number one studio album was Earth and Sun and Moon, bringing another three top ten singles on the US Modern Rock charts.

In the next decade, Midnight Oil released three further studio albums, all of which registered on the top ten in Australia, but did not match the success of their earlier efforts. In 1997, the band released the greatest hits album 20,000 Watt R.S.L., which has since achieved four times platinum sales in Australia. In 2002, lead vocalist Peter Garrett announced his decision to leave Midnight Oil, concluding the band's 30-year career. The group reformed in 2017.

== Albums ==
=== Studio albums ===
| Year | Album details | Chart peak positions | | | | | | | | | | | Certifications (sales thresholds) |
| Year | Album details | AUS | AUT | CAN | GER | NLD | NOR | NZ | SWE | SWI | UK | US | Certifications (sales thresholds) |
|---|---|---|---|---|---|---|---|---|---|---|---|---|---|
| 1978 | Midnight Oil: Recorded: September 1978; Released: November 1978; Label: Powderworks (MLF 233); Formats: CD, cassette, LP | 43 | — | — | — | — | — | — | — | — | — | — | AUS: 2× Platinum |
| 1979 | Head Injuries: Recorded: July & August 1979; Released: October 1979; Label: Powderworks (MLF 322); Formats: CD, cassette, LP | 36 | — | — | — | — | — | — | — | — | — | — | ARIA: Platinum |
| 1981 | Place Without a Postcard: Recorded: June - July 1981; Released: November 1981; Label: CBS (SBP 237704); Formats: CD, cassette, LP | 12 | — | — | — | — | — | — | — | — | — | — | ARIA: 2× Platinum |
| 1982 | 10, 9, 8, 7, 6, 5, 4, 3, 2, 1: Recorded: September 1982; Released: December 1982; Label: CBS (SBP 237868); Formats: CD, cassette, LP | 3 | — | 98 | — | — | — | 5 | — | — | — | 178 | ARIA: 7× Platinum; RIANZ: Platinum |
| 1984 | Red Sails in the Sunset: Recorded: June - August 1984; Released: October 1984; Label: CBS (SBP 238027); Formats: CD, cassette, LP | 1 | — | — | — | — | — | 20 | — | — | — | 177 | ARIA: 4× Platinum |
| 1987 | Diesel and Dust: Recorded: January - April 1987; Released: August 1987; Label: CBS (CDCBS 460005 2); Formats: CD, cassette, LP | 1 | — | 1 | 13 | 11 | — | 1 | 5 | 7 | 19 | 21 | ARIA: 7× Platinum; BPI: Gold; GLF: Gold; IFPI SWI: 2× Platinum; MC: 3× Platinum; RIAA: Platinum; RIANZ: Platinum |
| 1990 | Blue Sky Mining: Recorded: June - September 1989; Released: February 1990; Label: CBS (465653 2); Formats: CD, cassette, LP | 1 | 13 | 6 | 2 | 20 | 2 | 1 | 3 | 2 | 28 | 20 | ARIA: 5× Platinum; GLF: Gold; IFPI SWI: Platinum; MC: Platinum; RIAA: Gold; RIANZ: Platinum |
| 1993 | Earth and Sun and Moon: Recorded: October 1992 - January 1993; Released: 20 April 1993; Label: Columbia (CK 53793); Formats: CD, LP | 2 | — | 8 | 17 | 57 | — | 5 | 15 | 5 | 27 | 49 | ARIA: Platinum; IFPI SWI: Gold; MC: Gold |
| 1996 | Breathe: Recorded: May - June 1996; Released: October 1996; Label: Columbia (485402 2); Formats: CD, LP | 3 | — | 32 | 33 | — | — | 26 | — | 31 | — | 155 | ARIA: Gold |
| 1998 | Redneck Wonderland: Released: July 1998; Label: Columbia (489971 2); Formats: CD | 7 | — | — | — | — | — | — | — | — | — | — | ARIA: Gold |
| 2001 | Capricornia: Released: 2001; Label: Columbia (5062032000); Formats: CD | 8 | — | — | — | — | — | 28 | — | — | — | — | |
| 2020 | The Makarrata Project: Released: 30 October 2020; Label: Sony Music Australia (19439793942); Formats: CD, LP, digital download, streaming | 1 | — | — | — | — | — | — | — | 50 | — | — | |
| 2022 | Resist: Released: 18 February 2022; Label: Sony Music Australia (19439905882); Formats: CD, LP, digital download, streaming | 1 | — | — | 17 | — | — | 16 | — | 8 | — | — | |
"—" denotes releases that did not chart or were not released in that territory.

=== Compilation albums ===
| Year | Album details | Chart peak positions | | | Certifications |
| Year | Album details | AUS | NZ | GER | Certifications |
|---|---|---|---|---|---|
| 1990 | The Green Disc: Released: 1990 (promo); Label: Sprint Music; Formats: CD | —N/a | | | |
| 1997 | 20,000 Watt R.S.L.: Collection: Released: 12 October 1997; Label: Sony (488866 2); Formats: CD, LP | 1 | 18 | 78 | ARIA: 5× Platinum; SNEP: Gold |
| 1997 | The Best of the B-Sides: Released: 1997 (promo); Label: Columbia; Formats: CD | —N/a | | | |
| 2006 | Flat Chat: Released: 14 August 2006; Label: Sony BMG (82876 87409 2); Formats: CD | 21 | — | — | |
| 2012 | Essential Oils: Released: 2 November 2012; Label: Sony Music Australia; Formats: CD | 7 | 7 | — | ARIA: Platinum |
| 2017 | Lasseters Gold (Unreleased Demos): Released: 26 May 2017; Label: Sony Music Australia; Formats: DD | — | — | — | |
| 2017 | Chiko Locallo (B-sides and Rarities): Released: 26 May 2017; Label: Sony Music Australia; Formats: DD | — | — | — | |
"—" denotes releases that did not chart or were not released in that territory.

=== Live albums ===
| Year | Album details | Chart peak positions | | | | | | | | Certifications |
| Year | Album details | AUS | AUT | CAN | NLD | NZ | SWE | SWI | US | Certifications |
|---|---|---|---|---|---|---|---|---|---|---|
| 1992 | Scream in Blue: Live: Released: 5 May 1992; Label: Columbia (COL 471453 2); Formats: CD, cassette, LP | 3 | 30 | 60 | 70 | 28 | 42 | 28 | 141 | ARIA: Platinum |
| 2000 | The Real Thing: Released: 8 July 2000; Label: Columbia (498278 2); Formats: CD | 7 | — | — | — | — | — | — | — | ARIA: Gold |
| 2017 | Live At the Wireless, 1978, Studio 221: Released: 26 May 2017; Label: Sony Music Australia; Formats: DD | — | — | — | — | — | — | — | — | |
| 2017 | Punter Barrier BPM: Released: 26 May 2017; Label: Sony Music Australia; Formats: DD | — | — | — | — | — | — | — | — | |
| 2018 | Armistice Day – Live at the Domain, Sydney: Released: 9 November 2018; Label: Sony Music Australia; Formats: CD, DVD, Blu-ray, streaming, music download | 5 | — | — | — | — | — | — | — | |
| 2019 | Breathe Tour '97: Released: 13 April 2019; Label: Mountain Man; Formats: LP (limited edition) | — | — | — | — | — | — | — | — | |
| 2022 | Live at the Old Lion, Adelaide, 1982: Released: 2 December 2022; Label: Black Box Records, MGM Distribution; Formats: CD, digital | 7 | — | — | — | — | — | — | — | |
| 2026 | Head Injuries (Live At Selina's): Released: 27 November 2026; Label: Formats: CD, LP, digital | — | — | — | — | — | — | — | — | |
"—" denotes releases that did not chart or were not released in that territory.

=== Box sets ===
| Year | Album details | Chart peak positions |
| Year | Album details | AUS |
|---|---|---|
| 2017 | The Full Tank: Released: 12 May 2017; Label: Sony; Formats: 13×CD+DVD | 38 |
| 2017 | The Overflow Tank: Released: 12 May 2017; Label: Sony; Formats: 4×CD+8×DVD | — |

== Extended plays ==
| Year | EP details | Chart peak positions | | Certifications |
| Year | EP details | AUS | NZ | Certifications |
|---|---|---|---|---|
| 1980 | Bird Noises: Recorded: 21–22 July 1980; Released: October 1980; Label: Powderworks (MSPD 462); Formats: CD, cassette, LP | 28 | 48 | ARIA: Gold |
| 1985 | Species Deceases: Recorded: 5 days in September 1985; Released: December 1985; Label: Columbia (PCT 46135); Formats: CD, cassette, 12" vinyl | 1 | 42 | ARIA: 2× Platinum |
"—" denotes releases that did not chart or were not released in that territory.

== Singles ==
| Year | Title | Peak chart positions | | | | | | | | | | | Certifications | Album |
| Year | Title | AUS | CAN | FRA | NLD | NZ | NOR | SWI | UK | US Hot | US Main. | US Alt. | Certifications | Album |
|---|---|---|---|---|---|---|---|---|---|---|---|---|---|---|
| 1978 | "Run by Night" | 100 | — | — | — | — | — | — | — | — | x | x | | Midnight Oil |
| 1979 | "Cold Cold Change" | — | — | — | — | — | — | — | — | — | x | x | | Head Injuries |
| 1980 | "Back on the Borderline" | — | — | — | — | — | — | — | — | — | x | x | | Head Injuries |
| 1981 | "Don't Wanna Be the One" | 40 | — | — | — | — | — | — | — | — | — | x | | Place Without a Postcard |
| 1982 | "Armistice Day" | 31 | — | — | — | — | — | — | — | — | — | x | | Place Without a Postcard |
| 1982 | "US Forces" | 20 | — | — | — | — | — | — | — | — | — | x | | 10, 9, 8, 7, 6, 5, 4, 3, 2, 1 |
| 1983 | "Power and the Passion" | 8 | — | — | — | 4 | — | — | — | — | — | x | RMNZ: Gold | 10, 9, 8, 7, 6, 5, 4, 3, 2, 1 |
| 1983 | "Read About It" | — | — | — | — | — | — | — | — | — | — | x | | 10, 9, 8, 7, 6, 5, 4, 3, 2, 1 |
| 1984 | "When the Generals Talk" | — | — | — | — | — | — | — | — | — | — | x | | Red Sails in the Sunset |
| 1985 | "Best of Both Worlds" | — | — | — | — | — | — | — | — | — | — | x | | Red Sails in the Sunset |
| 1986 | "The Dead Heart"^{[A]} | 4 | 38 | 19 | 40 | 14 | — | — | 62^{^{[B]}} | 53 | 11 | x | | Diesel and Dust |
| 1987 | "Beds Are Burning"^{[A]} | 6 | 1 | 5 | 3 | 1 | — | — | 6^{^{[C]}} | 17 | 6 | x | ARIA: Platinum; MC: Gold; RMNZ: 2× Platinum; SNEP: Silver | Diesel and Dust |
| 1987 | "Put Down That Weapon" | 32 | — | 34 | — | 9 | — | — | — | — | — | x | | Diesel and Dust |
| 1988 | "Dreamworld" | — | — | — | — | — | — | 54 | — | — | 37 | 16 | | Diesel and Dust |
| 1990 | "Blue Sky Mine" | 8 | 7 | 25 | 33 | 2 | 8 | 11 | 66 | 47 | 1 | 1 | ARIA: Gold; RMNZ: Gold | Blue Sky Mining |
| 1990 | "Forgotten Years" | 26 | 36 | 44 | — | 24 | — | — | 97 | — | 11 | 1 | | Blue Sky Mining |
| 1990 | "King of the Mountain" | 25 | 76 | — | — | — | — | — | — | — | 20 | 3 | | Blue Sky Mining |
| 1990 | "Bedlam Bridge" | 46 | — | — | — | — | — | — | — | — | — | — | | Blue Sky Mining |
| 1991 | "One Country" | 51 | — | — | — | — | — | — | — | — | — | — | | Blue Sky Mining |
| 1992 | "Sometimes" (Live) | 33 | — | — | — | — | — | — | — | — | — | 20 | | Scream in Blue (Live) |
| 1992 | "Beds Are Burning" (Live) | 108 | — | — | — | — | — | — | — | — | — | — | | Scream in Blue (Live) |
| 1993 | "Truganini" | 10 | 11 | — | — | 4 | — | — | 29 | — | 10 | 4 | | Earth and Sun and Moon |
| 1993 | "My Country" | 52 | 51 | — | — | 49 | — | — | 66 | — | — | — | | Earth and Sun and Moon |
| 1993 | "In the Valley" | — | — | — | — | — | — | — | 60 | — | — | — | | Earth and Sun and Moon |
| 1993 | "Drums of Heaven" | — | — | — | — | — | — | — | — | — | — | 10 | | Earth and Sun and Moon |
| 1993 | "Outbreak of Love" | 57 | — | — | — | 45 | — | — | — | — (Note: "Outbreak of Love" did not enter the Billboard Hot 100, but peaked at number 8 on the Bubbling Under Hot 100 chart.) | — | 9 | | Earth and Sun and Moon |
| 1995 | "Land" | 63 | — | — | — | — | — | — | — | — | — | — | | Non-album single |
| 1996 | "Underwater" | 22 | 81 | — | — | — | — | — | — | — | — | — | | Breathe |
| 1996 | "Surf's Up Tonight" | 88 | — | — | — | — | — | — | — | — | — | — | | Breathe |
| 1997 | "White Skin Black Heart" | 80 | — | — | — | — | — | — | — | — | — | — | | Redneck Wonderland |
| 1998 | "Cemetery in My Mind" | — | — | — | — | — | — | — | — | — | — | — | | Redneck Wonderland |
| 1998 | "What Goes On" | — | — | — | — | — | — | — | — | — | — | — | | Redneck Wonderland |
| 1998 | "Redneck Wonderland" | 54 | — | — | — | — | — | — | — | — | — | — | | Redneck Wonderland |
| 1999 | "Say Your Prayers" | — | — | — | — | — | — | — | — | — | — | — | | The Real Thing / Capricornia |
| 2000 | "The Real Thing" | 48 | — | — | — | — | — | — | — | — | — | — | | The Real Thing |
| 2000 | "Spirit of the Age" | — | — | — | — | — | — | — | — | — | — | — | | The Real Thing |
| 2001 | "Golden Age" | — | — | — | — | — | — | — | — | — | — | — | | Capricornia |
| 2001 | "Too Much Sunshine" | — | — | — | — | — | — | — | — | — | — | — | | Capricornia |
| 2002 | "Luritja Way" | — | — | — | — | — | — | — | — | — | — | — | | Capricornia |
| 2002 | "Mosquito March" | — | — | — | — | — | — | — | — | — | — | — | | Capricornia |
| 2003 | "No Man's Land" | 79 | — | — | — | — | — | — | — | — | — | — | | Gaia |
| 2020 | "Gadigal Land" (featuring Dan Sultan, Joel Davison, Kaleena Briggs and Bunna Lawrie) | — (Note: "Gadigal Land" did not enter the ARIA Top 50 Singles Chart, but peaked at number 5 on the Australian Digital Song Sales Chart.) | — | — | — | — | — | — | — | — | — | — | | The Makarrata Project |
| 2020 | "First Nation" (featuring Jessica Mauboy and Tasman Keith) | — | — | — | — | — | — | — | — | — | — | — | | The Makarrata Project |
| 2021 | "Rising Seas" | — | — | — | — | — | — | — | — | — | — | — | | Resist |
| 2021 | "Tarkine" | — | — | — | — | — | — | — | — | — | — | — | | Resist |
| 2022 | "At the Time of Writing" | — | — | — | — | — | — | — | — | — | — | — | | Resist |
| 2022 | "We Resist" | — | — | — | — | — | — | — | — | — | — | — | | Resist |
"—" denotes releases that did not chart or were not released in that territory. "x" denotes that chart did not exist at the time.

Notes

- A "The Dead Heart" and "Beds Are Burning" were both released in United States and United Kingdom in 1988
- B "The Dead Heart" peaked at number 62 in 1989 after its re-release in the UK; its first release originally peaked at number 68
- C "Beds Are Burning" peaked at number 6 in 1989 after its re-release in the UK; its first release originally peaked at number 48

== Video albums ==
| Year | Details | Certifications |
|---|---|---|
| 1987 | Blackfella/Whitefella: Released: 1987; Label: SMV Enterprises (200440 2); Formats: VHS, DVD / CD (2008 re-release) | |
| 1990 | Black Rain Falls: Released: 1990; Label: CMV Enterprises (49048 2); Formats: VHS | |
| 1997 | 20,000 Watt R.S.L. The Midnight Oil Collection: Released: 1997; Label: SMV (200780 9); Formats: DVD | ARIA: 5× Platinum |
| 2004 | Best of Both Worlds: Released: 5 April 2004; Label: ABC (13740); Formats: DVD, CD | ARIA: Platinum |
| 2018 | Midnight Oil 1984: Released: 4 July 2018; Label: Madman Entertainment, Piccolo Productions; Formats: DVD, Digital | |
| 2018 | Armistice Day – Live at the Domain, Sydney: Released: 9 November 2018; Label: Sony Music Australia; Formats: CD, DVD, Blu-ray, streaming, music download | ARIA: Gold |

== Music videos ==
| Year | Title | Director |
|---|---|---|
| 1977 | "Used and Abused" (Live) | ^{[B]} |
| 1978 | "Run by Night" | ^{[B]} |
| 1978 | "Used and Abused" | ^{[A]} |
| 1979 | "Cold Cold Change" | ^{[A]} |
| 1980 | "Back on the Borderline" | Colin Wardrop |
| 1981 | "Armistice Day" (Live) | David Bradbury |
| 1982 | "No Time for Games" (Live) | Ray Argall |
| 1982 | "Lucky Country" (Live) | Ray Argall |
| 1982 | "US Forces" | Tony Stevens |
| 1983 | "Power and the Passion" | Ray Argall |
| 1983 | "Short Memory" (Live) | John Duigan, Ray Argall |
| 1984 | "Read About It" | Ray Argall |
| 1985 | "Read About It" (Live) | Mark Fitzgerald |
| 1985 | "Best of Both Worlds" | John Whitteron |
| 1985 | "Pictures" | John Whitteron, Tony Stevens |
| 1986 | "The Dead Heart" | Ray Argall |
| 1987 | "Beds Are Burning" | Andrew De Groot |
| 1987 | "Put Down That Weapon" | Martin Stauce / John Wilkinson |
| 1988 | "Dreamworld" | Andrew de Groot / Paul Elliot |
| 1989 | "Hercules" (Live) | Mark Fitzgerald |
| 1990 | "Blue Sky Mine" | Claudia Castle |
| 1990 | "Forgotten Years" | Claudia Castle |
| 1990 | "King of the Mountain" | John Diaz / Larry Jordan |
| 1990 | "Bedlam Bridge" | Claudia Castle |
| 1991 | "One Country" | Ken Duncan |
| 1992 | "Sometimes" (Live) | Larry Jordan |
| 1993 | "Truganini" (Australian Version) | ^{[B]} |
| 1993 | "Truganini" (US Version) | Josh Taft |
| 1993 | "My Country" | Claudia Castle |
| 1993 | "Outbreak of Love" | Sally Bongers / Paul Elliott |
| 1993 | "In the Valley" | Paul Elliott |
| 1996 | "Underwater" | Maurice Todman / Tim Bonython |
| 1996 | "Surf's Up Tonight" | Maurice Todman |
| 1996 | "Sins of Omission" (Live) | Maurice Todman |
| 1997 | "White Skin Black Heart" | Andrew Lancaster |
| 1998 | "Redneck Wonderland" | Jonathan Cohen, Olivia Rousset and Bentley Dean |
| 1998 | "Cemetery in My Mind" | ^{[B]} |
| 2002 | "Mosquito March" (Live) | Jon Olb and Sean Riley^{[C]} |
| 2002 | "Luritja Way" (Live) | Jon Olb and Sean Riley^{[C]} |
| 2015 | "Too Much Sunshine" | Bones Hillman and Justin Heitman |
| 2020 | "Gadigal Land" | Robert Hambling |
| 2020 | "First Nation" | Robert Hambling |
| 2021 | "Rising Seas" | Cameron March |
| 2022 | "We Resist" | |

Notes

- A These clips were filmed at the Channel Seven television station in Sydney and have no attributable director.
- B The name of the Director for these music videos has not been found in reliable sources.
- C These clips were filmed for the TV series Live at the Chapel. on 12 February 2002. They were included on a Special Edition release of Capricornia.

== Other appearances ==
| Year | Song contributed | Album |
|---|---|---|
| 1991 | "Wharf Rat" (Grateful Dead cover) | Deadicated: A Tribute to the Grateful Dead |
| 1998 | "Pub with No Beer" (Slim Dusty cover) | Not So Dusty – A Tribute to Slim Dusty |
| 2002 | "Beds Are Burning" (Live) | Live at the World Café: Vol. 15 - Handcrafted |
| 2003 | "Beds Are Burning" (Acoustic) | The Very Best of MTV Unplugged, Vol. 2 |
| 2003 | "No Man's Land" | Gaïa / Alan Simon |
| 2008 | "Beds Are Burning" (Tamarama mix) | Caution: Life Ahead! |
