= Armistice Day (album) =

Live album by Midnight Oil
- Released: November 2018
- Recorded: 6–18 November 2017
- Venue: The Domain, Sydney, Sidney Myer Music Bowl, Melbourne
- Genre: Rock
- Label: Sony Music Australia

Midnight Oil chronology
Essential Oils (2012)	Armistice Day (2018)	The Makarrata Project (2020)

Armistice Day (subtitled Live at the Domain, Sydney) is a live album by Australian rock band Midnight Oil. The majority of the album was recorded live at The Domain in Sydney, Australia on 11 November 2017; also known as Armistice Day, with three tracks recorded at Sidney Myer Music Bowl in Melbourne on 6 and 8 November 2017 and three more tracks recorded at The Domain on 17 November. The album was released on 9 November 2018 on 2xCD and 2xDVD and peaked at number 5 on the ARIA Charts.

At the ARIA Music Awards of 2019, the album was nominated for Best Rock Album.

== Background and release ==
In February 2017, Midnight Oil announced The Great Circle World Tour from the Sydney Harbour. The tour was the band's first in over 15 years, commenced in Sydney, travelled to 16 countries, completed 76 performances in six months and concluded at The Domain in November 2017.

== Reception ==
Jeff Jenkins from Stack Magazine called this a "re-formation that didn't suck" saying Midnight Oil had "lost none of their power and passion". Adding "This 26-song set is both a celebration of arguably our greatest band, and also a reminder to maintain the rage."

== Track listing ==
CD1

1. "Armistice Day" - 5:01
2. "Read About It" - 3:59
3. "Hercules" - 4:28
4. "Section 5 (Bus To Bondi)" - 3:11
5. "Treaty" (featuring Yirrmal) - 3:18
6. "Beds are Burning" - 5:12
7. "Ships of Freedom" - 3:30
8. "Warakurna" - 4:50
9. "US Forces" - 4:29
10. "Blue Sky Mine" - 4:16
11. "Stand in Line" - 5:56
12. "Power and the Passion" - 6:58
13. "Forgotten Years" - 4:39

CD2

1. "Redneck Wonderland" - 3:13
2. "Don't Wanna Be the One" - 3:00
3. "Put Down That Weapon" - 4:27
4. "Kosciusko" - 4:47
5. "Only the Strong" - 5:17
6. "The Dead Heart" - 7:51
7. "No Time for Games" - 6:13
8. "Short Memory" - 5:52
9. "Truganini" - 4:45
10. "Dreamworld" - 4:03
11. "Golden Age" - 3:28
12. "Sometimes" - 5:00
13. "King of the Mountain" - 4:14

DVD1: Armistice Day: Live at the Domain, Sydney

1. "Intro"
2. "Armistice Day"
3. "Reveille"
4. "Redneck Wonderland"
5. "Read About It"
6. "Lucky Country"
7. "Warakurna"
8. "Hercules"
9. "Truganini"
10. "Section Five (Bus to Bondi)"
11. "Stand in Line"
12. "Short Memory"
13. "Treaty"
14. "US Forces"
15. "Kosciuszko"
16. "The Dead Heart"
17. "Beds are Burning"
18. "Don't Wanna Be the One"
19. "King of the Mountain"
20. "Wedding Cake Island"
21. "Power and the Passion"
22. "Forgotten Years"
23. "Best of Both Worlds"
24. "No Times for Games" (bonus content)
25. "Only the Strong" (bonus content)

DVD2: Oils at the Reef

1. "Surfing With a Spoon"
2. "Sometimes"
3. "Koala Sprint"
4. "Ships of Freedom"
5. "Short Memory"
6. "Blue Sky Mine"
7. "No Time for Games"
8. "Dreamworld"
9. "Antarctica"
10. "Read About It"
11. "Progress"

== Personnel ==
- Peter Garrett - lead vocals, harmonica
- Jim Moginie - guitars, keyboards, vocals
- Bones Hillman - bass, vocals
- Robert Hirst - drums, vocals
- Martin Rotsey - guitars
- Jack Howard - horns, keyboards, backing vocals

== Charts ==
Chart (2018)	Peak position
Australian Albums (ARIA)	5

== Certifications ==
Region	Certification	Certified units/sales
Australia (ARIA)	Gold	7,500^{^}
^{^} Shipments figures based on certification alone.

== Release history ==
Region	Date	Format	Edition(s)	Label	Catalogue
Australia	9 November 2018	2xCD; digital download; streaming	Standard	Sony Music Australia	19075882472
Australia	9 November 2018	2xCD+2xDVD	Limited Deluxe Edition	Sony Music Australia	19075903002
Australia	21 June 2019	3xLP	Limited Edition Red Vinyl	Sony Music Australia	MOVLP2468
