= Live at the Old Lion, Adelaide, 1982 =

Live album by Midnight Oil
- Released: 2 December 2022
- Recorded: 26 March 1982
- Venue: Old Lion, Adelaide
- Label: Black Box Records

Midnight Oil chronology
| Resist (2022) | Live at the Old Lion, Adelaide, 1982 (2022) | Head Injuries (Live At Selina's) (2026) |

Live at the Old Lion, Adelaide, 1982 is a live album by Australian rock band Midnight Oil.The album was released digitally on 2 December 2022 and physically on 13 May 2023.

Following its physical release, the album peaked at number 7 on the ARIA charts.

== Background and release ==
The recording is the 30th release of the Australian Road Crew Association's (ARCA) Desk Tape Series, a series created by ARCA to raise funds to provide financial, health, counselling and well-being services for roadies and crew in crisis.

The Old Lion show took place on 26 March 1982 at The Old Lion in North Adelaide and was part of a two-week run through Victoria and South Australia. The album was released digitally on 2 December 2022.

Following the digital release, there was strong demand from fans for a CD version. Coordinating the CD physical release was "Frog" Harris, the owner of independent record store Songland Records. Harris said, "To make this project feasible for ARCA, I understandably needed to guarantee a certain amount of sales to ensure the success of the project. When I asked The Powderworkers (Midnight Oil fans) if they wanted this to happen, the reaction was as expected-instantaneous, wildly enthusiastic and supportive of, not only their band, but how the proceeds would be going to help roadies who have kept The Oils, and hundreds of other bands on the road over decades of gruelling touring."

The CD was a once only pressing and released on 13 May 2023.

== Commercial performance ==
The album debuted at number 7 on the ARIA chart. It was Midnight Oil's 17th ARIA top 10 release.

== Track listing ==
1. "Written in the Heart" - 3:04
2. "Brave Faces"- 5:24
3. "Armistice Day" - 4:20
4. "I'm the Cure" - 3:17
5. "Section 5 (Bus to Bondi)" - 3:50
6. "Quinella Holiday"/"Love's On Sale" - 5:16
7. "No Time for Games" - 4:09
8. "Burnie" - 5:29
9. "Cold Cold Change" - 3:05
10. "Powderworks" - 3:38
11. "Koala Sprint" - 5:18
12. "Back On the Borderline" - 2:54
13. "Don't Wanna Be the One" - 2:47
14. "Wedding Cake Island" - 2:49
15. "Stand in Line" - 5:10
16. "No Reaction" - 3:16

== Personnel ==
=== The band ===
- Peter Garrett - lead vocals
- Peter Gifford – bass, vocals
- Jim Moginie - guitars, keyboards, vocals
- Robert Hirst - drums, vocals
- Martin Rotsey - guitars

=== The crew ===
- Mark Woods - sound
- Michael Lippold - stage/ production manager
- Ron “Wormy” James - lights

== Charts ==
Chart performance for Live at the Old Lion, Adelaide, 1982
| Chart (2023) | Peak position |
|---|---|
| Australian Albums (ARIA) | 7 |

== Release history ==
| Region | Date | Format | Label | Catalogue | Reference |
|---|---|---|---|---|---|
| Worldwide | 2 December 2022 | digital download; streaming | Black Box Records, MGM Distribution | —N/a | |
| Australia | 13 May 2023 | CD | Black Box Records, MGM Distribution | BLACKBOX0002 | |
