= The Makarrata Project =

Studio album by Midnight Oil
- Released: 30 October 2020
- Recorded: 2017–2020
- Studios: Rancom Street, Oceanic (Sydney)
- Genres: Rock; folk; pop
- Length: 33:31
- Label: Sony
- Producer: Warne Livesey

Midnight Oil chronology
Armistice Day (2018)	The Makarrata Project (2020)	Resist (2022)

Singles from The Makarrata Project
- 1. "Gadigal Land" Released: 7 August 2020; 2. "First Nation" Released: 25 September 2020

The Makarrata Project is the twelfth studio album by Australian band Midnight Oil, released on 30 October 2020 by Sony Music Australia. The album is the first new material from the band since 2001's Capricornia, their first studio album to reach number one on the ARIA Charts since 1990's Blue Sky Mining, and one of the final releases to feature bassist and backing vocalist Bones Hillman before his death in November 2020.

At the 2021 ARIA Music Awards, the album was nominated for Album of the Year, Best Group and Best Rock Album.

== Background ==
In a statement, Midnight Oil members said, "After centuries of struggle for recognition and justice, 2017's Uluru Statement from the Heart called for the establishment of a 'First Nations Voice' enshrined in the Australian Constitution and the establishment of a 'Makarrata Commission' to supervise agreement-making and truth-telling between governments and Aboriginal and Torres Strait Islander peoples. We will donate our share of any proceeds received from this release to organisations which seek to elevate the Uluru Statement from the Heart in particular and Indigenous reconciliation more broadly".

Makarrata is a Yolngu word "describing a process of conflict resolution, peacemaking and justice", or "a coming together after a struggle", and delegates said that it "captures our aspirations for a fair and truthful relationship with the people of Australia", and the Makarrata Commission would "supervise a process of agreement-making between governments and First Nations".

Frontman Peter Garrett said, "It's been 250 years since Cook landed, when Aboriginal and Islander peoples' children, land & waters were first taken away. Yet the impacts of the original dispossession are still widely felt. We urgently need to up the ante on Reconciliation generally and follow through on the ground breaking Uluru Statement. These songs are about recognising that our shared history needs settlement, and that more than ever, as the Statement From The Heart proclaims, we need to walk together to create a better future".

Midnight Oil had recorded 20 tracks with Warne Livesey producing. The Makarrata Project is a seven-track mini-album, which features collaborations with Indigenous artists and First Nations people.

== Critical reception ==
Professional ratings
Aggregate scores
Source	Rating
Metacritic	80/100
Review scores
Source	Rating
AllMusic	4/5 stars
Classic Rock	4/5 stars
The Guardian	4/5 stars
Record Collector	4/5 stars
The Sydney Morning Herald	4.5/5 stars
Uncut	7/10

Bernard Zuel from The Guardian said "The Makarrata Project focuses on Indigenous issues and white relationships to them from several angles [and] ... the songs veer from some kind of gospel-folk over a piano rumination, winsome atmosphere and back-porch balladry to brass-punching, rattling rock, tense-but-rhythmic groove, outright pop and sunset acoustic sway. In them, Midnight Oil's main songwriters, Rob Hirst, Jim Moginie and Peter Garrett, express anger and frustration, hope and connection – historical and contemporary."

== Track listing ==
Side one
No.	Title	Writer(s)	Featuring	Length
1.	"First Nation"	Robert Hirst, Tasman Keith Jarrett	Jessica Mauboy and Tasman Keith	4:51
2.	"Gadigal Land"	Hirst, Davidson, Lawrie	Dan Sultan, Joel Davidson, Kaleena Briggs and Bunna Lawrie	4:45
3.	"Change the Date"	James Moginie, Yunupingu	Gurrumul Yunupingu and Dan Sultan	5:58
4.	"Terror Australia"	Peter Garrett, Bones Hillman	Alice Skye	3:49

Side two
No.	Title	Writer(s)	Featuring	Length
5.	"Desert Man, Desert Woman"	Garrett, Yamma	Frank Yamma	3:09
6.	"Wind in My Head" (Makarrata version)	Jim Moginie, Carmody, N Murray, Butcher	Kev Carmody and Sammy Butcher	4:19
7.	"Uluru Statement from the Heart / Come on Down"	Anderson, Grant, Goodes, Yovich, Cassar-Daley / Moginie	Troy Cassar-Daley, Pat Anderson, Stan Grant, Adam Goodes and Ursula Yovich	6:40
Total length:				33:31

== Personnel ==
Credits based on Sony Music Entertainment (19439793942) cover notes:

Midnight Oil

- Peter Garrett – lead vocals
- Bones Hillman – bass guitar, vocals
- Rob Hirst – drums, vocals, percussion
- Jim Moginie – guitars, keyboards, vocals
- Martin Rotsey – guitars

Other personnel

- Jessica Mauboy – lead vocals (track 1)
- Tasman Keith – lead vocals (track 1)
- Dan Sultan – lead vocals (tracks 2, 3), guitar (track 2)
- Joel Davison – lead vocals (track 2)
- Kaleena Briggs – lead vocals (track 2), backing vocals (track 3)
- Bunna Lawrie – lead vocals (track 2)
- Gurrumul Yunupingu – lead vocals (track 3)
- Leah Flanagan – backing vocals (tracks 3, 6)
- Alice Skye – lead vocals (track 4)
- Frank Yamma – lead vocals (track 5)
- Kev Carmody – lead vocals (track 6)
- Sammy Butcher – lead vocals (track 6)
- Pat Anderson – spoken word (track 7)
- Stan Grant – spoken word (track 7)
- Adam Goodes – spoken word (track 7)
- Ursula Yovich – spoken word (track 7), backing vocals (tracks 3, 6)
- Troy Cassar-Daley – spoken word, lead vocals, guitar (track 7)

Technical work

- Producer, mixer, recording engineer – Warne Livesey recorded at Rancom Street Studios and Oceanic Studios, Sydney
- Engineer (additional) – Jim Moginie
- Mastering – Emily Lazar at The Lodge, New York City
- Artwork – James Bellesini

== Charts ==
=== Weekly charts ===
Weekly chart performance for The Makarrata Project
Chart (2020)	Peak position
Australian Albums (ARIA)	1
Swiss Albums (Schweizer Hitparade)	50

=== Year-end charts ===
Year-end chart performance for The Makarrata Project
Chart (2020)	Position
Australian Albums (ARIA)	93
