= Armistice Day (disambiguation) =

Armistice Day is a day (11 November) to mark the armistice that ended World War I.

It may also refer to:

- Armistice Day (album), a live album by Australian rock band Midnight Oil
  - Armistice Day (song), a song on the album
- Armistice Day (United States), original name of the U.S. federal holiday Veterans Day
