= Blue Sky Mining =

Studio album by Midnight Oil
- Released: 9 February 1990
- Recorded: June−September 1989
- Studios: Rhinoceros (Sydney, Australia)
- Genre: Alternative rock
- Length: 46:52
- Label: Columbia
- Producers: Warne Livesey & Midnight Oil

Midnight Oil chronology
Diesel and Dust (1987)	Blue Sky Mining (1990)	The Green Disc (1990)

Singles from Blue Sky Mining
- 1. "Blue Sky Mine" Released: 29 January 1990; 2. "Forgotten Years" / "Shakers and Movers" Released: 16 April 1990; 3. "King of the Mountain" Released: 23 July 1990; 4. "Bedlam Bridge" Released: 22 October 1990; 5. "One Country" Released: 1 April 1991

Blue Sky Mining is the seventh studio album by Australian rock band Midnight Oil, released on 9 February 1990 under the Columbia Records label. This was the band's first studio album with bassist and backing vocalist Bones Hillman, who would remain in the group until his death in 2020. It peaked at number one on the ARIA albums chart. It stayed at number one for two weeks in Australia and had Top 5 chart success in Sweden, Switzerland and Norway. It peaked at number 20 on the Billboard 200 and number 28 on the UK charts. A limited release of the album featured a clear, blue vinyl.

== Background ==
Blue Sky Mining retains the alternative rock sound and Warne Livesey production of the band's previous album, Diesel and Dust, but is "more defiant and outspoken." The single "Blue Sky Mine" describes asbestos exposure in the Wittenoom mine tragedy. The lead single peaked at number eight on the ARIA singles charts, top 15 in Norway and Switzerland, number 47 on Billboard Hot 100 and number one on both their Mainstream and Modern Rock Tracks charts, and appeared on the UK charts. The second single, "Forgotten Years", was more moderately successful, reaching number 26 on the ARIA singles chart, number 97 in the UK, number 11 on the Mainstream Rock Tracks, and number one on the Modern Rock Tracks.

Hirst later said, "Warne's whole thing was to get as close to aural perfection as you possibly could, or as close as we were ever going to get - and Rhino the sort of place to do it. It was indulgent, excessive, and it was the kind of luxury that's afforded to bands with a hit album, which we had." Moginie added, "I didn't realise that we were making a commercial record and we certainly never set out to. We ended up going for good songs and lots of acoustic guitars, and it worked."

== Reception ==
Professional ratings
Review scores
Source	Rating
AllMusic	4/5 stars
Chicago Sun-Times	4/4 stars
Daily News	3/4 stars
Entertainment Weekly	B
Los Angeles Times	3.5/5 stars
NME	8/10
Orlando Sentinel	3/5 stars
Q	4/5 stars
Rolling Stone	4/5 stars
The Rolling Stone Album Guide	3.5/5 stars

At the ARIA Music Awards of 1991, Midnight Oil won 'Best Group' and an 'Outstanding Achievement Award', and were awarded 'Best Cover Art', 'Best Video' and 'Album of the Year' for Blue Sky Mining. Manager Gary Morris, accepting awards for Midnight Oil, was criticised for a speech lasting 20 minutes.

== Track listing ==
Side one
No.	Title	Writer(s)	Length
1.	"Blue Sky Mine"	Peter Garrett, Bones Hillman, Robert Hirst, Jim Moginie, Martin Rotsey	4:18
2.	"Stars of Warburton"	Garrett, Moginie	4:43
3.	"Bedlam Bridge"	Hirst	4:25
4.	"Forgotten Years"	Hirst, Moginie	4:21
5.	"Mountains of Burma"	Hirst	4:50

Side two
No.	Title	Writer(s)	Length
6.	"King of the Mountain"	Hirst, Moginie	3:58
7.	"River Runs Red"	Hirst, Moginie	5:28
8.	"Shakers and Movers"	Garrett, Moginie	4:32
9.	"One Country"	Garrett, Moginie	5:56
10.	"Antarctica"	Garrett, Hirst, Moginie, Rotsey	4:22

Bonus track on some pressings
No.	Title	Writer(s)	Length
11.	"You May Not Be Released"	Moginie	3:38

- Some early Australian copies included the track "You May Not Be Released"—it was the B-side to a 12-inch issue of "Forgotten Years", and it is believed that this only appeared on the first 1,000 LP copies. It also appeared on early cassette copies and CDs.

== Charts ==
=== Weekly charts ===
Chart (1990–1991)	Peak position
Australian Albums (ARIA)	1
Austrian Albums (Ö3 Austria)	13
Canada Top Albums/CDs (RPM)	6
German Albums (Offizielle Top 100)	2
Dutch Albums (Album Top 100)	27
New Zealand Albums (RMNZ)	1
Norwegian Albums (VG-lista)	2
Swedish Albums (Sverigetopplistan)	3
Swiss Albums (Schweizer Hitparade)	2
UK Albums (Official Charts)	28
US Billboard 200	20

=== Year-end charts ===
Chart (1990)	Position
Australian Albums (ARIA)	3
Canadian Albums (RPM)	28
German Albums (Offizielle Top 100)	19
New Zealand Albums (RMNZ)	8
Swiss Albums (Schweizer Hitparade)	12
US Billboard 200	67

== Certifications ==
Region	Certification	Certified units/sales
Australia (ARIA)	5× Platinum	350,000^{^}
Canada (Music Canada)	Platinum	100,000^{^}
France (SNEP)	Platinum	300,000^{*}
Germany (BVMI)	Gold	250,000^{^}
New Zealand (RMNZ)	Platinum	15,000^{^}
Sweden (GLF)	Gold	50,000^{^}
Switzerland (IFPI Switzerland)	Platinum	50,000^{^}
United States (RIAA)	Gold	500,000^{^}
^{*} Sales figures based on certification alone.^{^} Shipments figures based on certification alone.

== Personnel ==
Midnight Oil

- Peter Garrett - lead vocals, harmonica
- Bones Hillman - bass, vocals
- Robert Hirst - drums, vocals
- Jim Moginie - guitars, keyboards, vocals
- Martin Rotsey - guitars

Additional personnel

- Warne Livesey - additional keyboards
- Jeremy Smith - French horn
- Phillip Hartl - String Leader
- Glad and Carl - Horn Swells
