= Place Without a Postcard =

Studio album by Midnight Oil
- Released: November 1981
- Recorded: June–July 1981; Warnham Lodge Farm, Sussex, England
- Genre: Post-punk; new wave; hard rock
- Length: 40:57
- Label: Sprint Music / CBS
- Producer: Glyn Johns

Midnight Oil chronology
Bird Noises (1980)	Place Without a Postcard (1981)	10, 9, 8, 7, 6, 5, 4, 3, 2, 1 (1982)

Singles from Place Without a Postcard
- 1. "Don't Wanna Be the One" Released: October 1981; 2. "Armistice Day" Released: May 1982

Place Without a Postcard is the third studio album by Australian rock band Midnight Oil, released in November 1981 under Sprint Music and the Columbia Records label. It peaked at No. 12 on the Kent Music Report albums chart and the related singles "Don't Wanna Be the One" and "Armistice Day" reached the associated Top 40 chart.

== Background ==
The band's third LP Place Without a Postcard, released by CBS Records in November 1981, was recorded in Sussex with English producer Glyn Johns (The Rolling Stones, The Who) at a studio/barn on Johns' property. Garrett said, "The main reason we travelled to Britain was that, at that time, the feeling was that the records sounded better." Creative tensions between the band and Johns plagued the recording and the group were not totally happy with the outcome.

Johns had an arrangement with A&M Records and they asked Midnight Oil to return to the studio to record material suitable for an American single release – the group refused and returned to Australia. Place Without a Postcard peaked at No. 12 on the albums charts and related singles "Don't Wanna Be the One" (No. 40) and "Armistice Day" reached the Top 40 in Australia. Cover and other photography by Robert Butcher.

== Critical reception ==
Professional ratings
Review scores
Source	Rating
AllMusic	3/5 stars
The Rolling Stone Album Guide	3.5/5 stars

The Rolling Stone Album Guide praised the "fatter sound and more focused songs." Trouser Press wrote that "the experimentation yielded valuable lessons, and James Moginie, the group's composer, also began to jell his distinctive guitar sound, as well as creatively exploring keyboards."

AllMusic's William Ruhlmann wrote:

"The band was experiencing growing pains, trying to stretch musically, and, at least at first, this made for a dilution of their hard rock focus moving toward a pop style they hadn't fully developed. Place Without a Postcard had its share of powerfully performed songs, but its sound was light compared to the band's first two albums, the stylistic experiments were not yet bearing fruit, and, with an emphasis placed on the vocals, Peter Garrett sounded overly strident."

== Track listing ==
Side one
No.	Title	Writer(s)	Length
1.	"Don't Wanna Be the One"	Peter Garrett, Robert Hirst, Jim Moginie, Martin Rotsey	3:04
2.	"Brave Faces"	Garrett, Moginie	4:48
3.	"Armistice Day"	Hirst, Moginie, Rotsey	4:31
4.	"Someone Else to Blame"	Peter Gifford, Hirst, Moginie	2:49
5.	"Basement Flat"	Garrett, Moginie, Rotsey	4:37

Side two
No.	Title	Writer(s)	Length
6.	"Written in the Heart"	Hirst, Moginie, Rotsey	3:15
7.	"Burnie"	Garrett, Moginie	4:50
8.	"Quinella Holiday"	Garrett, Moginie	2:35
9.	"Loves on Sale"	Garrett, Rotsey	2:22
10.	"If Ned Kelly Was King"	Garrett, Moginie	3:41
11.	"Lucky Country"	Garrett, Hirst, Moginie, Rotsey	4:55

== Charts ==
Chart (1981/82)	Position
Australian Kent Music Report	12

== Certifications ==
Region	Certification	Certified units/sales
Australia (ARIA)	2× Platinum	140,000^{^}
^{^} Shipments figures based on certification alone.

== Personnel ==
Midnight Oil

- Peter Garrett – lead vocals
- Peter Gifford – bass, vocals
- Rob Hirst – drums, vocals
- Jim Moginie – guitars, keyboards
- Martin Rotsey – guitars

Production

- Glyn Johns – production, engineering
- Sean Fullen – assistant engineer

Design

- Robert Butcher – design, album cover photo
