= 10, 9, 8, 7, 6, 5, 4, 3, 2, 1 =

Studio album by Midnight Oil
- Released: November 1982
- Recorded: September 1982
- Studio: Townhouse (London)
- Genres: New wave; art rock
- Length: 45:55
- Label: Sprint Music / Columbia
- Producers: Nick Launay & Midnight Oil

Midnight Oil chronology
Place Without a Postcard (1981)	10, 9, 8, 7, 6, 5, 4, 3, 2, 1 (1982)	Red Sails in the Sunset (1984)

Singles from 10, 9, 8, 7, 6, 5, 4, 3, 2, 1
- 1. "US Forces" Released: November 1982; 2. "Power and the Passion" Released: March 1983; 3. "Read About It" Released: 1983

10, 9, 8, 7, 6, 5, 4, 3, 2, 1 is the fourth studio album by Australian rock band Midnight Oil, released in 1982 by Columbia Records. It hit number 3 on the Australian Kent Music Report Albums Chart during 171 total weeks. The band's first US release, it peaked at number 178 on the Billboard 200. At the Countdown Music Awards, it was nominated for Best Australian Album.

In October 2010, the album made the Top 40 of the book 100 Best Australian Albums. It is listed in the Triple J Hottest 100 Australian Albums of All Time, 2011, at number 21. In December 2021, it was number 19 in Rolling Stone Australia's "200 Greatest Albums of All Time" countdown.

== Content ==
Contrary to the hard rock of Midnight Oil's previous albums, 10, 9, 8, 7, 6, 5, 4, 3, 2, 1 has been described as new wave and art rock, with difficult time signatures. Drummer Rob Hirst added, "With that album, we were one of the first Australian bands to get into sequencers and synthesisers. It was quite a landmark album at the time, and still stands up really well, because it managed to combine all the aggression and frustration of Midnight Oil with some amazing studio stuff courtesy of Nick."

The album's closing track "Somebody's Trying to Tell Me Something" contains a note held by the group which continues into the album's runout groove, and emulated on the CD version for just over 40 seconds. This is an approximation of a locked groove, a method used a number of times on vinyl albums (such as Diamond Dogs and Sgt. Pepper's Lonely Hearts Club Band) wherein the ending sound continues into the runout groove indefinitely until the turntable arm is lifted or the automatic return, present on some turntables, kicks in.

Singer Peter Garrett noted: "We wanted, as a band, to make this album lyrically stronger, because these are fucking desperate times. It's very important for us to get immediate, because we can't go on making records like this for years and years and people can't go on ignoring it."

== Reception ==
Professional ratings
Review scores
Source	Rating
AllMusic	4.5/5 stars
Rolling Stone	4/5 stars
The Rolling Stone Album Guide	4/5 stars
Tom Hull	B−
The Village Voice	C+

Mark Deming at AllMusic wrote: "It's remarkably listenable and catchy, offering up one passionate anthem after another. The band's politics are both well considered and unapologetically upfront throughout ... 10, 9, 8, 7, 6, 5, 4, 3, 2, 1 was [Midnight Oil's] first undeniably great album and still ranks with their very best." David Fricke said the album "sounds like the end of the world turned up to 10".

The Sun-Herald added: "This extraordinary collection of songs marked the evolution of Midnight Oil from explosive live band to studio act capable of great invention without ever sounding poxy." Roadrunner praised how the band "combine power with intelligence. 10-1 is without doubt their most subtle and intricate offering to date.

== Track listing ==
Side one
No.	Title	Writer(s)	Length
1.	"Outside World"	Jim Moginie	4:24
2.	"Only the Strong"	Robert Hirst, Moginie	4:31
3.	"Short Memory"	Peter Garrett, Hirst, Moginie	3:52
4.	"Read About It"	Garrett, Hirst, Moginie	3:52
5.	"Scream in Blue"	Garrett, Moginie, Martin Rotsey	6:22

Side two
No.	Title	Writer(s)	Length
6.	"US Forces"	Garrett, Moginie	4:06
7.	"Power and the Passion"	Garrett, Hirst, Moginie	5:39
8.	"Maralinga"	Garrett, Moginie	4:44
9.	"Tin Legs and Tin Mines"	Garrett, Moginie, Rotsey	4:28
10.	"Somebody's Trying to Tell Me Something"	Garrett, Peter Gifford, Hirst, Moginie, Rotsey	3:58

== Charts ==
=== Weekly ===
Chart (1982+)	Peak position
Australian Kent Music Report	3
Canada (RPM)	98
New Zealand Albums (RMNZ)	5
US Billboard 200	178

=== Year-end ===
Chart (1983)	Position
Australian Kent Music Report	2
Chart (1984)	Position
New Zealand Albums (RMNZ)	37

== Certifications ==
Region	Certification	Certified units/sales
Australia (ARIA)	7× Platinum	490,000^{^}
New Zealand (RMNZ)	Platinum	15,000^{^}
^{^} Shipments figures based on certification alone.

== Personnel ==
Midnight Oil

- Peter Garrett – lead vocals
- Peter Gifford – bass, vocals
- Rob Hirst – drums, vocals
- Jim Moginie – guitars, keyboards
- Martin Rotsey – guitars

Additional personnel

- Gary Barnacle, Peter Thoms & Luke Tunney – brass (on "Power and the Passion")
