= Read About It =

Single by Midnight Oil

from the album 10, 9, 8, 7, 6, 5, 4, 3, 2, 1
- B-side: "Outside World"
- Released: 1983
- Length: 3:51
- Label: Columbia
- Songwriter(s): Robert Hirst, James Moginie, Peter Garrett, Martin Rotsey, Peter Gifford
- Producer(s): Midnight Oil, Nick Launay

Midnight Oil singles chronology
"Power and the Passion" (1983)	"Read About It" (1983)	"When the Generals Talk" (1984)

"Read About It" is a song by Australian rock band Midnight Oil, released as the third and final single from their 1982 studio album, 10, 9, 8, 7, 6, 5, 4, 3, 2, 1. It was a favourite with the band and with fans, appearing at least once on every tour since its release, as well as being played at the WaveAid concert in 2005. Only a handful of songs ("Power and the Passion", "Beds Are Burning", "The Dead Heart", and "Say Your Prayers") are known to have been performed so often by the band. (Despite this, "Read About It" failed to make the singles charts in Australia or any other country.)

At the 1984 Countdown Music Awards, the group were nominated for Best Group Performance in a Video for their work in this work.

== Song structure and meaning ==
The abrasive "Read About It" has a repeatedly staggered time signature, shifting between 7/4, 4/4, and 6/4.

The song targets Rupert Murdoch in particular and Australian media in general. On the Blackfella/Whitefella Tour, Peter Garrett referred to the song as the 'Rupert Murdoch Alligator Express'.

== In popular culture ==
The song was used by Scott Hicks in an early scene in his 1988 film Sebastian and the Sparrow, when "Sparrow", the Vietnamese street kid, breaks into Sebastian Thornbury's up-market West Lakes home.

== Track listing ==
1. "Read About It" (Rob Hirst, Jim Moginie, Peter Garrett, Martin Rotsey, Peter Gifford) – 3:51
2. "Outside World" (Hirst, Moginie, Garrett, Rotsey, Gifford) – 4:22

== Compilations ==
The song's original studio version was featured on Flat Chat.
