= The Aerial Maps =

Australian band

The Aerial Maps are a band from Sydney, Australia, based around the writing/lyrics and vocals of Adam Gibson, formed in late 2007 with Gibson, plus Simon Holmes (The Hummingbirds), Adam's brother Simon Gibson (Disneyfist, Sneeze, Modern Giant) and Sean Kennedy as the core members. The band is known for the spoken-word/storytelling delivery of Adam Gibson, with evocative musical backing that branches into pop-song, soundscape, and rock.

== Current line-up (2024) ==
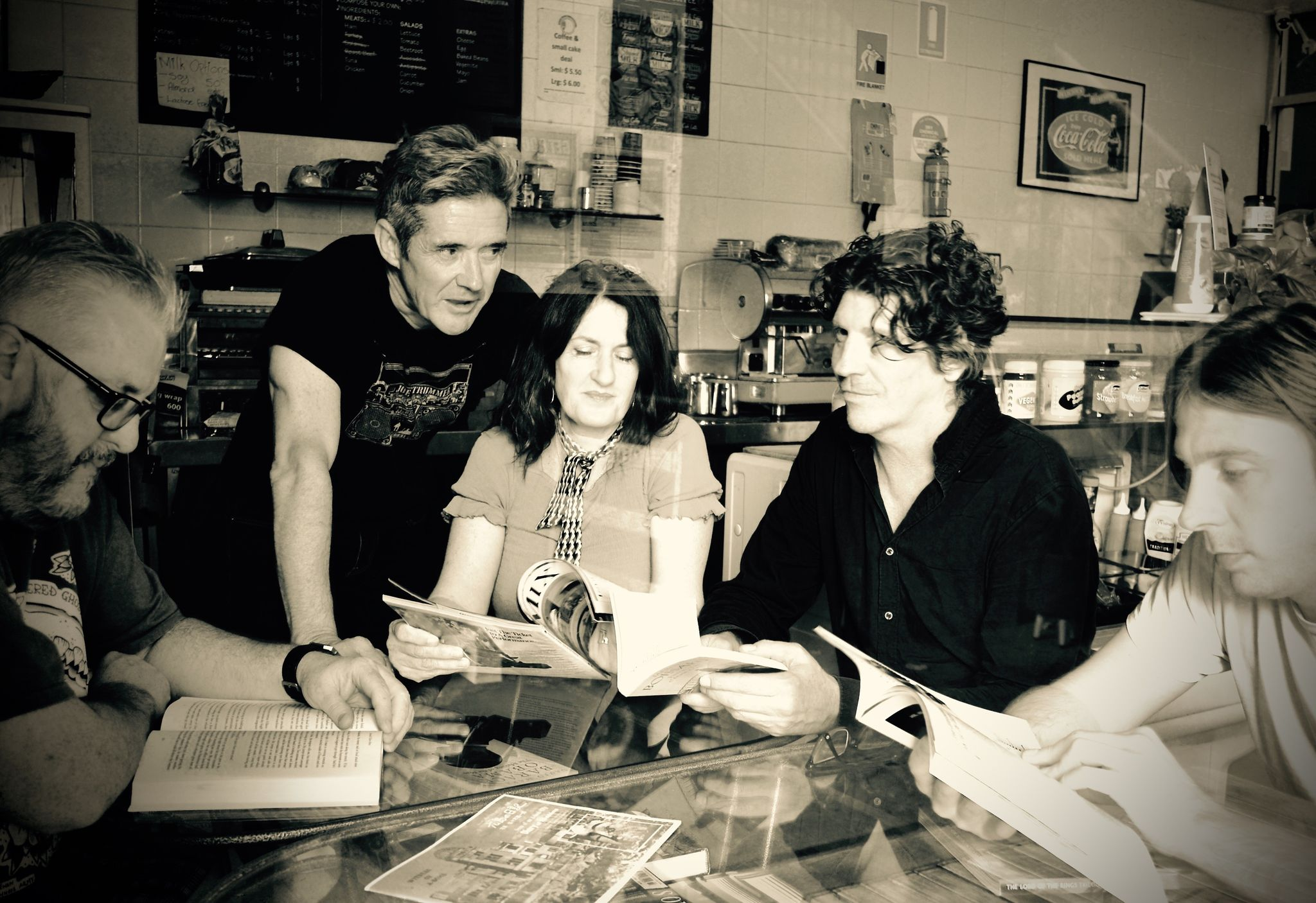
The Aerial Maps in 2022.

The current line-up consists of Adam Gibson on vocals, Alannah Russack (The Hummingbirds) on guitar and vocals, Peter Fenton (Crow) on guitar and vocals, Mark Hyland (Disneyfist, Handsome Young Strangers) on bass and vocals, and Jasper Fenton (Decoder Ring, The Laurels) on drums. Simon Gibson is also an ongoing contributor to the band, co-writing several songs in varying capacities, with guitarist Andy Meehan (Modern Giant, Dusty Ravens) guesting on guitar on occasion, with Safari Lee playing trumpet also on occasion and on the band's 2021 album, Intimate Hinterland.

The band's 2024 album, Our Sunburnt Dream, was recorded at Oceanic Studios, Brookvale, Sydney, with this same line-up, with the occasional contribution by Jim Moginie (Midnight Oil). Moginie and Ted Howard produced the album, with Howard and Moginie also co-engineering the record.

== Influences ==
The Aerial Maps are influenced by the bright landscapes and long distances of Australia, of the like described by bands such as the Triffids, Not Drowning Waving, the Go-Betweens and Midnight Oil, with the folk song sensibility of the likes of Weddings Parties Anything and Mick Thomas also a strong influence.

With varying members in the current line-up from an array of Sydney guitar bands, including Crow and the Hummingbirds, some of those influences can also be heard, with Adam Gibson further citing Jack Kerouac and his spoken word releases with Steve Allen as a significant early influence.

== First two albums period (2007-2015) ==
The Aerial Maps' debut album, In the Blinding Sunlight, was recorded at Damien Gerard Studios in Sydney in late 2007 and released in 2008 by Popboomerang Records. It was met with acclaim, earning strong reviews and substantial airplay, with the song ‘On the Punt’ in particular reaching a wide audience. The music for 'On the Punt' was written by Simon Gibson, with Andy Meehan and Simon Holmes playing guitar. Lucy Lehmann sung back-up vocals, with Anthony 'AJ' Johnsen playing drums in much of the live shows of the period. Tim Byron played keys on the album.

In 2009, ‘On the Punt’ was selected for an ABC Records compilation release titled Songs For Dad and in 2010, In the Blinding Sunlight was named as Best Spoken Word Release 2005–2010 at the Overland Poetry Awards.

The Aerial Maps’ second album The Sunset Park, a “novel in song”, was released in 2011, also by Popboomerang Records, again meeting with critical acclaim. It was also recorded at Damien Gerard Studios in Sydney throughout 2009–2010. The line-up of the band at the time included Adam Gibson, Simon Holmes, Sean Kennedy, Alannah Russack, Andy Meehan, Tim Byron, Peregrin Chiara, Lucy Lehmann, and Simon Gibson. Adam drove from Fremantle in Western Australia to the East Coast of Australia in the process of writing and researching the content and story of the album, which was originally intended as a novel.

Following the release of that album, the band toured extensively around Australia, playing shows with acts such as David Bridie, The Paradise Motel, Mick Thomas, Angie Hart, and The Gin Club, building a following with their “story-songs” of love, loss, and landscape.

== Adam Gibson and the Ark-Ark Birds (2015-2017) ==
With a similar line-up, the band briefly morphed into Adam Gibson and The Ark-Ark Birds, releasing the albums Australia Restless in 2015 and Cities of Spinifex in 2017.

The band line-up for the recorded albums and live shows included Alannah Russack (vocals), Stewart Cahn (guitar), Shane Angus (guitar, vocals), Darren "Fud" Ryan (drums), Simon Gibson (drums. ukulele), Tim Byron (keyboards, vocals), Jadey O'Regan (keyboards), Danny Yau (bass), Peter Colquhoun (back vocals), and Mick Hart (guitar, bass, vocals).

It was also in 2017 when founding Maps’ member Simon Holmes died, bringing to a close the initial iteration of the Aerial Maps.

== Death of Simon Holmes (2017-present) ==
Simon Holmes was an integral founding member of the Aerial Maps. It was his sonic vision, along with that of Simon and Adam Gibson, that shaped the first two Aerial Maps albums. It was Holmes’ passing that spurred Gibson to reconvene under the name of The Aerial Maps and, after a 5-year hiatus, begin a new era of the band. With a new sense of purpose and a new line-up consisting of himself, Simon Gibson, Alannah Russack (ex-Hummingbirds), Peter Fenton (Crow), Mark Hyland, and Jasper Fenton, the band played extensive shows, with bands such as Halfway and Mick Thomas, and embarked on the recording of a new album.

The result of which was the 2021 album Intimate Hinterland.

== Return album, Intimate Hinterland (2021) ==
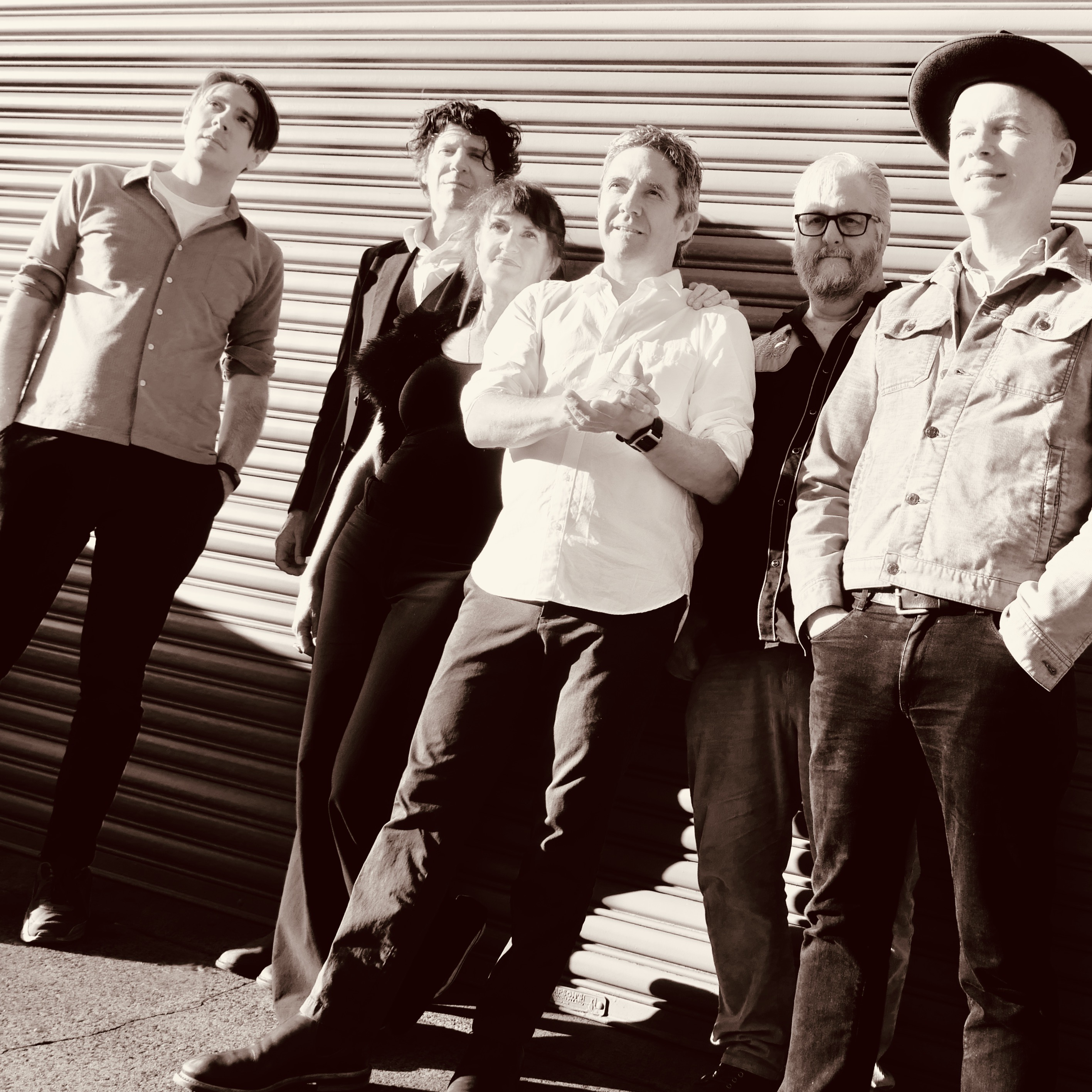
The Aerial Maps (Pic by Safari Lee)

A widescreen experience that took the listener on a journey through the Australian landscape, Intimate Hinterland was a collection of 7 songs. Heralding their first album release in 10 years, it was joyful return for a band who have a sense of timelessness in their sound. Critically acclaimed, the album was a travelogue-in-song. Adam spoke to Lindsay McDougall on ABC Radio upon its release in an extensive interview.

== New album recording (2022-2023) ==
In late December, 2022, the band began the process of recording some new songs for an envisaged new album with Midnight Oil's Jim Moginie overseeing the recording at Oceanic Studios in Sydney. At the conclusion of the first sessions of recording, they had recorded 11 new songs, with further recording in mid 2023 consolidating the selection of songs for a new album. The resultant 13 songs in total formed the content of their 4th album, Our Sunburnt Dream, released on June 21, 2024.

== Our Sunburnt Dream (2024) ==
Released on June 21, 2024, Our Sunburnt Dream, contains 13 new songs, with two singles released prior to the album's release. The first, Eucalyptus Road, and the 2nd, Any Summer Day.

The tracklisting is as follows:

1. I Always Sought The Sky (Tucabia)
2. Any Summer Day
3. Eucalyptus Road
4. Make Mine Love
5. For Just This Moment
6. The Time Of Spiders
7. Miss Rebecca And The Nambucca River
8. Sweet Motel Night
9. Against The Western Sun
10. The Mullumbimby Night
11. The Great North-West
12. Head Up North Forever
13. How We Tried To Break The Drought

== Related projects ==
Adam Gibson also released a compilation "Best-of" in 2020, entitled There's a Name for this Feeling. This was a double album which compiled songs from Modern Giant, The Aerial Maps, and Adam Gibson and the Ark-Ark Birds, and was released by Coolin' By Sound records.

Adam Gibson was shortlisted for the Australian/Vogel Literary Award in 2002 for his unpublished manuscript entitled "Blinding Sunlight'.

Adam was also a member of Modern Giant, playing bass, alongside Gynia Favot on vocals/guitar, Andy Meehan on guitar and brother Simon Gibson on drums.
