= King of the Mountain (Midnight Oil song) =

1990 Midnight Oil song

Single by Midnight Oil

from the album Blue Sky Mining
- Released: 23 July 1990
- Length: 3:58
- Label: Columbia
- Songwriters: Rob Hirst, Jim Moginie, Peter Garrett, Martin Rotsey, Bones Hillman
- Producers: Midnight Oil, Warne Livesey

Midnight Oil singles chronology
"Forgotten Years" (1990)	"King of the Mountain" (1990)	"Bedlam Bridge" (1990)

"King of the Mountain" is a song by Australian rock band Midnight Oil, released in 1990 as the third single from their seventh studio album, Blue Sky Mining (1990). It peaked at No. 25 on the Australian Singles Chart, No. 3 on the US Billboard Modern Rock Tracks chart, and No. 20 on the Billboard Album Rock Tracks chart.

The music video was partly filmed in front of the Exxon Building in Manhattan, New York City. This portion of the video shows the band performing in front of a banner that reads "Midnight Oil makes you dance, Exxon oil makes us sick."

== Background ==
Although some people think the song is a reference to Peter Brock and the Bathurst 1000 held at Mount Panorama, drummer Rob Hirst said the song is actually inspired by the footrace up Mount Cooroora and the surrounding natural beauty and unique history of the Noosa hinterland.

== Track listings ==
7-inch version
No.	Title	Writer(s)	Length
1.	"King of the Mountain"	R. Hirst, J. Moginie, P. Garrett, M. Rotsey, W. Stevens	3:58
2.	"Instant Karma!" (live)	J. Lennon	3:12

12-inch version
No.	Title	Writer(s)	Length
1.	"King of the Mountain" (Mountain mix)	R. Hirst, J. Moginie, P. Garrett, M. Rotsey, W. Stevens	5:30
2.	"Instant Karma!" (live)	J. Lennon	3:12
3.	"King of the Mountain"	R. Hirst, J. Moginie, P. Garrett, M. Rotsey, W. Stevens	3:58

== Charts ==
Chart (1990)	Peak position
Australia (ARIA)	25
Canada Top Singles (RPM)	76
US Alternative Airplay (Billboard)	3
US Mainstream Rock (Billboard)	20
