= Bullroarer (disambiguation) =

A bullroarer is a ritual sound instrument and an ancient communication device used for communicating over greatly extended distances. Bullroarer may also refer to:

- "Bullroarer", a song on Midnight Oil's 1987 album Diesel and Dust
- Bandobras "Bullroarer" Took, the great-great-grand-uncle of Bilbo Baggins in The Hobbit.
