= Resist (Midnight Oil album) =

Studio album by Midnight Oil
- Released: 18 February 2022
- Recorded: 2017–2020
- Genre: Alternative rock
- Length: 60:04
- Label: Sony
- Producer: Warne Livesey

Midnight Oil chronology
The Makarrata Project (2020)	Resist (2022)

Singles from Resist
- 1. "Rising Seas" Released: 28 October 2021; 2. "Tarkine" Released: 17 December 2021; 3. "At the Time of Writing" Released: 4 February 2022; 4. "We Resist" Released: 18 February 2022

Resist is the thirteenth studio album by Australian band Midnight Oil, released on 18 February 2022 by Sony Music Australia. The album was supported by the band's final Australian and New Zealand tour, concluding in May 2022 with guitarist Jim Moginie saying "We've played intensely physical gigs since our humble beginnings back in 1977 and we never want to take even the slightest risk of compromising that." Despite this being the group's final tour, all members were as of the album's release still open to recording in the future. Resist was the band's final album with drummer Rob Hirst before his death in 2026.

At the 2022 ARIA Music Awards, the album was nominated for Best Group, while the tour was nominated for Best Australian Live Act.

== Background ==
In 2017, Midnight Oil returned from a long hiatus, toured Australia and Europe before returning to the studio for the first time in over 18 years and recorded 20 new songs. The first collection of that material formed The Makarrata Project, which debuted at number one on the ARIA Chart on the same weekend that long-time bass player Bones Hillman died.

On 26 November 2021, Midnight Oil announced the release of their 13th studio album, Resist featuring the other 12 new songs they recorded with Hillman. The album became available for preorder from 30 November 2021 and got scheduled for release on 18 February 2022.

On 17 December 2021, the second single "Tarkine" was released. The song had already been debuted live on the 2019 tour.

On 4 February 2022, the album's third single "At the Time of Writing" was released.

On 18 February 2022, "We Resist" was sent to radio as the album's fourth single.

== Critical reception ==
Professional ratings
Review scores
Source	Rating
The Newcastle Herald	4/5 stars

Jeff Jenkins from Stack said "the Oils have never been a band to rest on their laurels, and that remains the case here. Put simply, Resist is a thrill from start to finish." concluding the review saying "If Resist is the end of the road for Midnight Oil, it's one to treasure."

Josh Leeson from the Newcastle Herald said "Midnight Oil's farewell album Resist delivers everything Oils fans could have hoped for. It's direct and passionate, but the rage has been tempered by a sense of failure. Peter Garrett once sung 'The time has come / To say fair's fair' but on Resist's opening track 'Rising Seas' he bemoans that his generation could have already failed the youth through inaction on climate change." Leeson adds "Resist has certainly whet the appetite for Midnight Oil's farewell tour. They sign off as Australia's greatest political band, who still have something poignant to say. It's now up to the new generation to keep pushing that battering ram forward."

The Australian said "On a collection aptly named Resist, the Sydney rock band retains its trademark urgency and instrumental dynamics laced with lyrical vitriol."

== Commercial performance ==
In Australia, Resist debuted atop the ARIA Albums Chart for the chart dated 28 February 2022, becoming the band's fifth number one album and the second Australian number one album of that year. In response to the news, Midnight Oil issued a press statement criticising the Morrison government, stating: "We've been fortunate to have some great media support, particularly from the ABC and Triple M, but clearly the federal government needs to introduce better local content rules—and better enforcement of those rules—across all platforms to make sure that the next generation of local artists get a fair go." The band noted that only four other Australian releases featured in that week's top 40 albums— F*ck Love by the Kid Laroi (number 13), Are You Haunted? by Methyl Ethel (number 22), The Very Best by INXS (number 35), and The Slow Rush by Tame Impala (number 36), respectively.

== Track listing ==
Resist track listing
No.	Title	Writer(s)	Length
1.	"Rising Seas"	Jim Moginie	5:50
2.	"The Barka-Darling River"	Rob Hirst, Moginie	6:49
3.	"Tarkine"	Moginie	4:20
4.	"At the Time of Writing"	Hirst, Moginie	4:39
5.	"Nobody's Child"	Peter Garrett, Moginie	4:27
6.	"To the Ends of the Earth"	Moginie	5:01
7.	"Reef"	Moginie	4:18
8.	"We Resist"	Moginie	5:18
9.	"Lost at Sea"	Hirst, Moginie	4:45
10.	"Undercover"	Garrett	3:15
11.	"We Are Not Afraid"	Garrett, Moginie	4:29
12.	"Last Frontier"	Garrett	6:53
Total length:			60:04

== Personnel ==
Midnight Oil

- Peter Garrett – lead vocals
- Bones Hillman – bass, vocals
- Robert Hirst – drums, vocals
- Jim Moginie – guitars, keyboards, vocals
- Martin Rotsey – guitars

Additional musicians

- Evelyn Finnerty – violin (3)
- Andy Bickers – saxophones (4, 12)
- Julian Thompson – cello (11)
- Kamahl – speech (12)

Production

- Warne Livesey – production, mixing, additional keyboards
- Jim Moginie – additional engineering
- Chris Allgood & Emily Lazar – mastering

== Charts ==
=== Weekly charts ===
Weekly chart performance for Resist
Chart (2022–2025)	Peak position
Australian Albums (ARIA)	1
Belgian Albums (Ultratop Flanders)	150
Belgian Albums (Ultratop Wallonia)	72
French Albums (SNEP)	93
German Albums (Offizielle Top 100)	17
Greek Albums (IFPI)	78
New Zealand Albums (RMNZ)	16
Swiss Albums (Schweizer Hitparade)	8
UK Album Downloads (Official Charts)	44

=== Year-end charts ===
Year-end chart performance for Resist
Chart (2022)	Position
Australian Albums (ARIA)	88
