= US Forces (song) =

Single by Midnight Oil

from the album 10, 9, 8, 7, 6, 5, 4, 3, 2, 1
- Released: November 1982
- Genre: Alternative rock
- Label: Columbia
- Songwriters: Jim Moginie, Rob Hirst, Peter Garrett, Martin Rotsey, Peter Gifford
- Producers: Nick Launay & Midnight Oil

Midnight Oil singles chronology
"Armistice Day" (1982)	"US Forces" (1982)	"Power and the Passion" (1983)

Music video
- US Forces on YouTube

"US Forces" is the first single released from Australian rock band Midnight Oil's fourth studio album, 10, 9, 8, 7, 6, 5, 4, 3, 2, 1. The song, which denounces US military intervention in foreign affairs, charted at no. 20 in Australia.

The music video was filmed in the Central Coast of New South Wales at the Vales Point Power Station, Mannering Park.

In January 2018, as part of Triple M's "Ozzest 100", the 'most Australian' songs of all time, "US Forces" was ranked number 55.

== Background ==
In 1983, for the "Stop The Drop" concert video, Peter Garrett, the lead singer, explained the song to the audience:

"Midnight Oil are here today because we're concerned about the issue of nuclear disarmament. And I think when we're in Europe, we realized how close people were to becoming to understand that, if the Russians or the Americans decided that they were actually going to set something off, they would be faced with the possibility that they may have nuclear warheads detonated in their backyard, or in their laundry. And so we became aware of the nuclear thing, and when we got back here we started to think about it, and get concerned about it. People in Australia are unaware that nuclear devices have been detonated here at Maralinga in the early fifties, and they're unaware of the facilities that the Americans have put here, which are used in their defence network and their attack network. And the Oils - we want to keep on making music, and we want people to keep on enjoying it, so, consequently, we think its very important to come and play and to dance and to learn and that's why we're here."

In 2004, when lead singer Peter Garrett was in the process of being preselected a Labor candidate for the safe Labor seat of Kingsford-Smith in Sydney, then Foreign Minister Alexander Downer made comments in parliament that it could be controversial in relation to the Australia - US alliance. Mr Downer used the opening lyrics of "US Forces" to argue that if Mr Garrett became a federal Labor MP, it could be harmful to Australian-United States relations.

== Track listing ==
1. "US Forces" (Moginie, Hirst, Garrett, Rotsey, Gifford) - 3:50
2. "Outside World" (Instrumental) (Moginie, Hirst, Garrett, Rotsey, Gifford) - 4:32

== Compilations ==
"US Forces" was later released on 20,000 Watt R.S.L., which was released in 1997.

== Charts ==
Chart (1982)	Peak position
Australian Singles Chart	20

== Chaser parody ==
The Australian satire show, The Chaser's War On Everything, made a parody of "US Forces", named "US Bases", about Peter Garrett's alleged selling-out. "US Bases" is set to the tune of "US Forces". It was featured in Episode 17, Season Two. The song features Andrew Hansen as Peter Garrett.

== See also ==
- Ronald Reagan in music
