= Rising Seas (song) =

2021 single by Midnight Oil)

Single by Midnight Oil

from the album Resist
- Released: 28 October 2021
- Length: 5:50
- Label: Sony Music Australia
- Songwriter(s): Jim Moginie

Midnight Oil singles chronology
"First Nation" (2020)	"Rising Seas" (2021)	"Tarkine" (2021)

"Rising Seas" is a song by Australian rock band Midnight Oil. The song was released on 28 October 2021 as the lead single from the band's thirteenth studio album Resist.

The group performed the song on The Sound on 28 November 2021.

At the APRA Music Awards of 2023, the song was shortlisted for Song of the Year and nominated for Most Performed Rock Work.

In 2023 the song was nominated for the Environmental Music Prize.

== Music video ==
The Cameron March-directed and Mac De Souza-executive produced video features the band performing the song in front of stock footage from Greenpeace and footage including Sydney shrouded in smoke, melting icecaps and floods.

== Critical reception ==
Sosefina Fuamoli from Music Feeds said the song is "as pointed as you'd expect" saying "the focus of 'Rising Seas' sits squarely on creating real change; as well as Australia's lack of action when it comes to achieving a number of targets, particularly to do with carbon emission. A song like 'Rising Seas' is made to incite and encourage positive change, as much as it about calling out the incompetencies and failings of those in power."

Tyler Jenke from Rolling Stone Australia said "'Rising Seas' is Midnight Oil at their powerful, resonant best."

Nathan Jolly from The Guardian said "The band delivers its grim message with the same raw power of its best anthems. This is an important song, and hopefully it won't fall on deaf ears."
