= Blue Sky Mine =

1990 single by Midnight Oil

Single by Midnight Oil

from the album Blue Sky Mining
- B-side: "You May Not Be Released"; "Wedding Cake Island"; "Blossom and Blood"
- Released: 29 January 1990
- Genre: Alternative rock; garage rock
- Length: 4:18
- Label: CBS; Sprint Music
- Songwriters: Rob Hirst; Jim Moginie; Peter Garrett; Martin Rotsey; Bones Hillman
- Producers: Midnight Oil, Warne Livesey

Midnight Oil singles chronology
"Dreamworld" (1987)	"Blue Sky Mine" (1990)	"Forgotten Years" (1990)

Music video
- Blue Sky Mine on YouTube

"Blue Sky Mine" is a song by Australian rock band Midnight Oil, released in January 1990 as the first single from their seventh studio album, Blue Sky Mining (1990). The song was inspired by the experiences of workers at the Wittenoom asbestos mines who contracted various asbestos-related diseases. The "blue" refers to blue asbestos, and the "sugar refining company" mentioned in the lyrics refers to the Colonial Sugar Refining Company Ltd, the owner of the mines.

== Reception ==
"Blue Sky Mine" peaked at No. 7 on the Canadian RPM 100 Singles chart, No. 8 on the Australian Singles Chart, No. 47 on the US Billboard Hot 100, and No. 1 on both the Billboard Album Rock Tracks and Modern Rock Tracks charts. It charted the highest in New Zealand, where it reached No. 2 for two weeks in March 1990. The music video, directed by Claudia Castle, won the ARIA Award for Best Video at the ARIA Music Awards of 1991.

Double J named it in the top fifty Australian songs of the 1990s, saying, "It just so happens to also have a beat perfect for fist-pumping and a chorus crafted for hearty singalongs, which is why it appealed to the masses around the world. If even a small percentage of rock'n'roll fans took something from their message, the band's work was not in vain." In January 2018, as part of Triple M's "Ozzest 100", the 'most Australian' songs of all time, "Blue Sky Mine" was ranked number 39, and ranked 99 on the Triple J Hottest 100 of Australian Songs.

Reviewed at the time of release, Juke said, "Here the sloganeering is tempered with more musical variety. Organ and harmonica coupled with a more restrained vocal from the bald god brings a welcome change from the heavy-handed breast-beating of recent releases."

== Track listings ==
7-inch version
No.	Title	Writer(s)	Length
1.	"Blue Sky Mine"	R. Hirst, J. Moginie, P. Garrett, M. Rotsey, W. Stevens	4:20
2.	"You May Not Be Released"	R. Hirst, J. Moginie, P. Garrett, Rotsey, W. Stevens	3:40
Total length:			8:00

12-inch version
No.	Title	Writer(s)	Length
1.	"Blue Sky Mine"	R. Hirst, J. Moginie, P. Garrett, M. Rotsey, W. Stevens	4:18
2.	"Wedding Cake Island"	R. Hirst, J. Moginie, P. Garrett, M. Rotsey, P. Gifford	3:15
3.	"Blossom and Blood"	R. Hirst, J. Moginie, P. Garrett, M. Rotsey, P. Gifford	4:35
Total length:			12:08

== Charts ==
=== Weekly charts ===
Weekly chart performance for "Blue Sky Mine"
Chart (1990)	Peak position
Australia (ARIA)	8
Belgium (Ultratop 50 Flanders)	41
Canada Top Singles (RPM)	7
Canada Adult Contemporary (RPM)	39
Europe (Eurochart Hot 100)	56
France (SNEP)	25
Germany (GfK)	45
Ireland (IRMA)	30
Netherlands (Dutch Top 40)	28
Netherlands (Single Top 100)	33
New Zealand (Recorded Music NZ)	2
Norway (VG-lista)	8
Switzerland (Schweizer Hitparade)	11
UK Singles (Official Charts)	66
US Billboard Hot 100	47
US Alternative Airplay (Billboard)	1
US Mainstream Rock (Billboard)	1
US Cash Box Top 100	27

=== Year-end charts ===
Year-end chart performance for "Blue Sky Mine"
Chart (1990)	Position
Australia (ARIA)	35
Canada Top Singles (RPM)	43
US Album Rock Tracks (Billboard)	26
US Modern Rock Tracks (Billboard)	20

== Certifications ==
Certifications for "Blue Sky Mine"
Region	Certification	Certified units/sales
Australia (ARIA)	Gold	35,000^{^}
New Zealand (RMNZ)	Gold	15,000^{‡}
^{^} Shipments figures based on certification alone.^{‡} Sales+streaming figures based on certification alone.

== Release history ==
Release dates and formats for "Blue Sky Mine"
Region	Date	Format(s)	Label(s)	Ref.
Australia	29 January 1990	7-inch vinyl; CD; cassette	CBS; Sprint Music	
United Kingdom	5 February 1990	7-inch vinyl; 12-inch vinyl; CD; cassette	CBS; Sprint Music	
United Kingdom	19 February 1990	7-inch vinyl (gatefold sleeve)	CBS; Sprint Music	
Japan	21 March 1990	Mini-CD	Epic	

== See also ==
- List of Billboard Mainstream Rock number-one songs of the 1990s
- List of Billboard number-one alternative singles of the 1990s
