= Mick Hart =

Australian musician (1970–2020)

- Born: Michael James Hart; Gunnedah, New South Wales, Australia
- Died: 23 August 2020 (aged 50) Sydney, New South Wales, Australia

Michael James Hart (8 May 1970 – 23 August 2020) was an Australian musician. His debut album, Still the Flowers Bloom (March 2001), reached the ARIA Albums Chart top 100. It had been recorded in late 2000 with Jim Moginie (of Midnight Oil) producing. Hart's second album, Upside Down in the Full Face of Optimism, was nominated for Best Blues & Roots Album at the ARIA Music Awards of 2002.

On 25 August 2020, it was reported that Hart had died.

== Discography ==
=== Albums ===
Title	Album details	Peak chart positions
Title	Album details	AUS
Still the Flowers Bloom	Release date: March 2001; Label: Mushroom Records (333452); Formats: CD	88
Upside Down	Release date: 2002; Label: Mick Hart / SDS (000544); Formats: CD	-
No Compromise	Release date: August 2004; Label: Mick Hart / SDS (000566); Formats: CD	-
Finding Home	Release date: June 2007; Label: Mick Hart / SDS (000577); Formats: CD	-
What Lies Beneath	Release date: May 2009; Label: Mick Hart (MHCD06); Formats: CD, DD	-
Side By Side	Release date: July 2012; Label: Mick Hart; Formats: DD	-
Under a Vacant Sky	Release date: 2014; Label: Mick Hart (MHCD08); Formats: CD, DD	-
Awake	Release date: 26 April 2019; Label: Mick Hart; Formats: CD, DD	-

=== Extended plays ===
Title	EP details
Release	Release date: 1997; Label: Mick Hart (999998); Formats: CD
Kill Yourself for Love	Release date: 1999; Label: Mick Hart (Hart 2); Formats: CD

=== Singles ===
Title	Year	Album
"Nothing is Real"	1997	Release
"Watching it Fade"	2001	Still the Flowers Bloom
"If You Could"	2002	Still the Flowers Bloom
"The Way it Is"	2019	Awake
"3am or Anytime"	2019	Awake
