= Dom Turner =

- Also known as: Sid Chrome (Angry Tradesmen)
- Born: Dominic Turner
- Origin: Australia
- Genres: Blues and Roots
- Instruments: Guitar; Resonator Guitar various Asian folk instruments
- Website: www.backsliders.com.au

Dominic Turner is an Australian blues guitarist, vocalist and key songwriter for the Australian blues band The Backsliders. Dom also has a number of solo projects including Dom Turner & The Rural Blues Project, and Dom Turner & Supro. In 2002, Dom along with Rob Hirst, formed the band Angry Tradesman.

He specialises in "bottle neck" slide guitar using resonator guitars as well as 6 and 12 string acoustic and electric guitars. Dom's session guitar work can be heard on a variety of Australian albums, such as Rob Hirst's (from Midnight Oil and was also the drummer in The Backsliders up until his death on 20 January 2026) Ghostwriters Second Skin album. Dom's influences are many and varied – a blend of delta blues, piedmont blues, rock, dub and sounds of Asia.

He is a highly regarded speaker on blues and roots music and has guested on ABC (Australian Broadcasting Corporation) radio programs and presented music workshops at festivals and in universities (both nationally and internationally). He has also contributed songs for the ABC's television show Sea Change.

In 2004, Dom was voted Songwriter of the Year at the Australian Blues Awards in Goulburn, NSW and has a sculpture in recognition of this honour at the Goulburn Visitors Centre.

== Albums ==
Backsliders

- 2026 Bonecrunch
- 2016 - Heathen Songbook
- 2014 - Dark Side
- 2011 - Starvation Box
- 2009 - Throwbacks
- 2007 - Left Field Holler
- 2005 - Live
- 2003 - Live at the Basement (DVD)
- 2002 - Hanoi
- 1999 - Poverty Deluxe
- 1998 - Downtime (A Ten Year Collection Of Backsliders Music)
- 1995 - Wide Open
- 1993 - Live at the Royal
- 1991 - Hellhound
- 1989 - Sitting on a Million
- 1988 - Preaching Blues

Dom Turner & The Rural Blues Project

- 2023 - Sit Tight

Dom Turner & Jin Hi Kim

- Microtonal Crossroads Two: Music for Slide Guitar & Komungo

Dom Turner & Tony Wheeler

- 2019 Microtonal Crossroads One: Music for Slide Guitar and Guqin

The Turner Brown Band

- 2017-Sliding Steel
- 2018-Sneak Attack
- 2018 Attitude Adjuster

Phil Wiggins & Dom Turner

- 2015 Owing the Devil a Day's Work
- 2019 Wolf Tickets

Dom Turner and Supro

Dom Turner and Supro

- 2000 - Electro Vee

Kim Sinh and Dom Turner

- 2012 - Two Days in Hanoi

Dom Turner and Ian Collard

- 2012 - Mama Says We're Crazy Too
