= Dreamworld (Midnight Oil song) =

Single by Midnight Oil

from the album Diesel and Dust
- Released: December 1987
- Label: Sprint; Columbia
- Songwriters: James Moginie; Robert Hirst; Peter Garrett
- Producers: Warne Livesy, Midnight Oil

Midnight Oil singles chronology
"Put Down That Weapon" (1987)	"Dreamworld" (1987)	"Blue Sky Mine" (1990)

"Dreamworld" is a song by Australian rock band Midnight Oil released in 1987 as the fourth and final single from their sixth studio album, Diesel and Dust. In the United States, the song reached No. 16 on the Modern Rock chart and No. 37 on the Mainstream Rock chart.

The song laments the loss of much of Queensland's built heritage — including the Cloudland Dance Hall, where Midnight Oil had frequently performed — which was demolished under the then-ruling Joh Bjelke-Petersen state government. Prior to the song being released, the band performed a version with some alternative lyrics at the Live @ RMIT, Melbourne, Australia - March 7, 1987 concert. The Dreamworld theme park, which inspired the song's name, is briefly shown in the music video. The video also includes demolition footage of the above-mentioned built heritage.

== Track listings ==
7"

1. "Dreamworld" - 3:36
2. "Short Memory" - 4:54

12"

1. "Dreamworld" - 3:36
2. "Short Memory" - 4:54
3. "Beds are Burning" (Tamarama Mix) - 8:04

== Chart performance ==
=== Weekly charts ===
Chart (1988/89)	Peak position
Italy Singles Chart FIMI	21
New Zealand Singles Chart	34
Poland Singles Chart	62
U.S. Billboard Hot 100	91
U.S. Billboard Alternative Songs	94
U.S. Billboard Mainstream Rock	37

=== Year-end charts ===
Chart (1988)	Peak position
UK Singles Chart	89
