= Melbourne Street, North Adelaide =

Street in North Adelaide, South Australia

Melbourne Street South Australia
- Coordinates: 34.910766°S 138.601193°E (Southwest end); 34.903987°S 138.611547°E (Northeast end)

General information
- Type: Street
- Location: North Adelaide
- Length: 1.3 km (0.8 mi)

Major junctions
- Southwest end: Sir Edwin Smith Avenue; North Adelaide
- Brougham Place
- Northeast end: Park Road; Mann Road; North Adelaide

Location(s)
- LGA(s): City of Adelaide

Melbourne Street is a street situated in the Adelaide suburb of North Adelaide, South Australia.

== History and description ==
Melbourne Street is the main commercial area of the second-largest of the three grids that comprise North Adelaide. It was named after William Lamb, 2nd Viscount Melbourne (after whom Melbourne is also named), who was British Prime Minister when the South Australia Foundation Act received parliamentary approval.

Melbourne Street is bracketed by Brougham Place and Mann Road and runs in a north-easterly direction. It principally consists of cafes, restaurants, boutique businesses, and retail shops. The street also contains many colonial-era buildings.

It was a very vibrant place in the 1980s, attracting crowds of people with the first leather shop in Adelaide and high-end restaurants, but as the street layouts were changed and more traffic started flowing through the street, the shoppers diminished. Although the businesses are still there, it was much quieter by the 2010s.

== Attractions ==
The David Roche Foundation Museum is housed in Fermoy House, the former home (from 1954 to 2013) of collector David Roche AM (1930–2013). Today it is run as a museum and hosts exhibitions, such as the S.H. Ervin Gallery's 2021 Salon des Refusés exhibition (the alternative Archibald and Wynne Prize selections), and Australian Toys 1880–1965: The Luke Jones Collection (2024)

Other attractions and events taking place in Melbourne Street, including:

- Meander Market, comprising artisanal stalls and live music, held twice a year
- Mannequins on Melbourne Street
- SALA art trail
- Specialist children's shoe store, Ollie Ashenden
- High-end fashion and homeware stores
- Australia's first "social impact laundromat", a commercial laundromat run by Orange Sky, with profits helping to fund the organisation's laundry services to homeless people

== Notable buildings ==
Two of the well-known buildings on the street are The Lion Hotel, which was built as part of a brewery and is now a fashionable public house, and Buffalo Cottage, which was built in 1851. St Ann's College is also located nearby.

=== Lion Hotel ===
The heritage-listed Lion Hotel is located at 161-175 Melbourne Street on its corner with Jerningham Street. The Lion's malthouse, kiln, and store cellars were built for Bailey and Stanley, and designed by well-known architect Daniel Garlick, and are of a similar design to design to his design of what is now the Knappstein Enterprise Winery. in Clare. The builders were Brown and Thompson, who used Glen Osmond bluestone for the construction, mostly completed by 1872. Alterations were carried out in 1873 and 1875 to designs by James Cumming (Note: Cumming also designed Norwood Baptist Church.), who also then designed the current hotel building, which was completed around 1883. The hotel obtained its first licence for serving liquor in 1881.

Original co-owner Bailey sold his share to W.H. Beaglehole in 1873, resulting in the operating partners then being Beaglehole, Johnston, James, and Gasquoine. In 1884 Beaglehole organised formation of the Lion Brewing and Malting Company and was elected chairman of directors. In 1888 the Lion Brewing and Malting Company was floated by Beaglehole and Johnston. Beaglehole, along with Johnston senior and his sons James and Andrew thus secured the brewing, hotel, and property rights of the company, issuing 75,000 shares of one pound each.

After 1914, beer was supplied to the hotel by Walkerville Cooperative Brewing Co., and the brewing section of the Lion complex ceased production, although it continued to produce aerated waters and cordials.

The hotel was listed on the South Australian Heritage Register on 11 September 1986. In 1972 it was renamed The Old Lion, a name it retained until after 1996, when it reverted to The Lion Hotel after undertaking renovations by its new owners Tim Gregg and Andrew Svencis.

As The Old Lion, the pub hosted live music. In May 1974, during a rehearsal at the hotel, Bon Scott had a huge argument with a member of his band AC/DC. After storming out, he was in a collision with a car on his Suzuki 550 motorbike, which left him in a coma for three days. Midnight Oil's 1982 performance at the hotel was captured on their CD Live at the Old Lion, Adelaide, 1982. Several tracks of Diesel's 1993 album The Lobbyist were recorded at the Old Lion.

During the COVID-19 pandemic in 2020, the hotel was forced to close for some months, and was afterwards purchased by the Duxton Pubs Group, who were still the owners in December 2023.
