= Put Down That Weapon =

Single by Midnight Oil

from the album Diesel and Dust
- Released: 7 December 1987
- Length: 4:38
- Label: Sprint; Columbia
- Songwriters: James Moginie; Robert Hirst; Peter Garrett
- Producers: Warne Livesy, Midnight Oil

Midnight Oil singles chronology
"Beds Are Burning" (1987)	"Put Down That Weapon" (1987)	"Dreamworld" (1988)

"Put Down That Weapon" is a song by Australian rock band Midnight Oil. The song was released in December 1987 as the third single from their sixth studio album, Diesel and Dust.

== Track listing ==
Australian release

1. "Put Down That Weapon" (Hirst, Moginie, Garrett, Rotsey, Gifford) - 4:38
2. "(What's So Funny 'Bout) Peace, Love, and Understanding" (Nick Lowe) -

European release

1. "Put Down That Weapon" (Hirst, Moginie, Garrett, Rotsey, Gifford) - 4:38
2. "Dreamworld" (Hirst, Moginie, Garrett, Rotsey, Gifford) - 3:36
3. "Short Memory" (Hirst, Moginie, Garrett, Rotsey, Gifford) - 4:54

== Charts ==
Chart (1987/88)	Position
Australian Kent Music Report	32
France (SNEP)	34
New Zealand (Recorded Music NZ)	9
