= Forgotten Years =

1990 single by Midnight Oil

Single by Midnight Oil

from the album Blue Sky Mining
- B-side: "Shakers and Movers"; "You May Not Be Released"
- Released: 16 April 1990
- Length: 4:21
- Label: CBS; Sprint Music
- Songwriters: Rob Hirst; Jim Moginie
- Producers: Midnight Oil; Warne Livesey

Midnight Oil singles chronology
"Blue Sky Mine" (1990)	"Forgotten Years" (1990)	"King of the Mountain" (1990)

"Forgotten Years" is a song by Australian rock band Midnight Oil, released in April 1990 as the second single from their seventh studio album, Blue Sky Mining (1990). The song peaked at No. 26 on the Australian Singles Chart, No. 1 on the US Billboard Modern Rock Chart and No. 11 on the Billboard Album Rock Chart.

The song was inspired by drummer Rob Hirst's grandfather and father's experience of war and how they said it was up to future generations to avoid wars in the future and not to forget how horrible wars are. The music video was filmed in Douaumont Ossuary, France.

== Track listings ==
Australian 7-inch single
No.	Title	Writer(s)	Length
1.	"Forgotten Years"	Rob Hirst, Jim Moginie	4:21
2.	"Shakers and Movers"	Moginie, Peter Garrett	4:32

UK 7-inch single
No.	Title	Writer(s)	Length
1.	"Forgotten Years"	Hirst, Moginie	4:21
2.	"You May Not Be Released"	Moginie	3:38

== Charts ==
=== Weekly charts ===
Chart (1990)	Peak position
Australia (ARIA)	26
Canada Top Singles (RPM)	36
France (SNEP)	44
New Zealand (Recorded Music NZ)	24
UK Singles (Official Charts)	97
US Alternative Airplay (Billboard)	1
US Mainstream Rock (Billboard)	11

=== Year-end charts ===
Chart (1990)	Position
US Modern Rock Tracks (Billboard)	15

== Release history ==
Region	Date	Format(s)	Label(s)	Ref.
Australia	16 April 1990	7-inch vinyl; 12-inch vinyl; cassette	CBS; Sprint Music	
Japan	21 June 1990	Mini-CD	Epic	

== See also ==
- List of Billboard number-one alternative singles of the 1990s
