= Gadigal Land =

2020 single by Midnight Oil

Single by Midnight Oil featuring Dan Sultan, Joel Davison, Kaleena Briggs and Bunna Lawrie

from the album The Makarrata Project
- Released: 7 August 2020
- Length: 4:45
- Label: Sony Music Australia
- Songwriters: Rob Hirst * Joel Davidson * Bunna Lawrie
- Producer: Warne Livesey

Midnight Oil singles chronology
"No Man's Land" (2003)	"Gadigal Land" (2020)	"First Nation" (2020)

Dan Sultan singles chronology
"Every Day My Mother's Voice" (2019)	"Gadigal Land" (2020)

"Gadigal Land" is a song by Australian rock band Midnight Oil featuring Dan Sultan, Joel Davison, Kaleena Briggs and Bunna Lawrie. The song was released on 7 August 2020. It is the band's first single in 17 years, and is part of The Makarrata Project, a themed mini-album of collaborations with Indigenous artists.

Midnight Oil has pledged to donate its share of any proceeds it receives from the song to organisations promoting the 2017 Uluru Statement from the Heart, which called for the creation of a "First Nations Voice" enshrined in the Australian Constitution.

The song won Song of the Year at the APRA Music Awards of 2021.

== Background ==
The track takes its title from Sydney's traditional owners, the Gadigal people (also spelled "Cadigal"), whose land extends from the Sydney CBD to South Head and through to the Inner West. A statement from Sony Music Australia explained: "It is a provocative recount of what happened in this place, and elsewhere in Australia, since 1788". The track lyrics use a play on the traditional Welcome to Country.

In a statement, the band said regarding the song:

"We've always been happy to lend our voice to those who call for racial justice, but it really feels like we've reached a tipping point. We urge the federal government to heed the messages in the Uluru Statement From The Heart and act accordingly. Hopefully this song and The Makarrata Project mini-album we've created alongside our First Nations friends can help shine a bit more light on the urgent need for genuine reconciliation in this country and in many other places too".

The song includes a verse written and spoken by Gadigal poet Joel Davison, who told NITV the experience was "validating" as a poet and language revivalist. Davison said: "It was kind of wild being contacted by their manager, and at first I thought it was a scam or something. I didn't know what to think. He expressed gratitude for his inclusion in the song, stating: "I'm glad that I was able to be there to make sure that the language of my Gadigal ancestors was heard on this track".

== Live performances ==
Midnight Oil played the song at the 17th Annual National Indigenous Music Awards on 8 August 2020.

== Critical reception ==
Tom Breihan from Stereogum described the song as "a big, bouncy rocker that sounds a whole lot like an arena jam", adding, "like so many Midnight Oil songs before it, the track is all about how Australia belongs to its Aboriginal people and about how white colonizers should get the fuck out".

Michael Dwyer of Sydney Morning Herald said: "Propelled by the Oils' unmistakable brass-studded attack, it is an uncompromising song of rage on behalf of the First Nations people acknowledged in the song's title and represented more broadly by the guest performers".

== Charts ==
Peak chart positions for "Gadigal Land"
Chart (2020)	Peak position
Australia Digital Song Sales (Billboard)	5

== Release history ==
Release formats for "Gadigal Land"
Region	Date	Format	Label	Refs.
Australia	7 August 2020	Digital download; streaming; radio	Sony Music Australia	
