= No Man's Land (Midnight Oil song) =

Single by Midnight Oil

from the album GAIA
- Released: 5 May 2003
- Recorded: February 2003
- Venue: Sydney
- Length: 3:15
- Label: Universal Music Australia
- Songwriter(s): Alan Simon
- Producer(s): Alan Simon

Midnight Oil singles chronology
"Mosquito March" (2002)	"No Man's Land" (2003)	"Gadigal Land" (2020)

"No Man's Land" is a song by Australian rock band Midnight Oil and was released in May 2003 as the lead single from the various artist compilation album Gaia.

Peter Garrett said "Midnight Oil thought the Gaia project had 'good soul'. Alerting everyone to what is happening to the environment and putting together a project as ambitious as this one takes a huge amount of commitment, so when Alan Simon approached us to add vocals and guitars to the track 'No Man's Land' we plugged in, sang and played. We sincerely hope the album and events that follow really touch people and bring on the changes so much needed in our world."

All royalties generated from sales of the single and album will go to the Environmental Planetary Urgencies Charter.

== Track listings ==
CD single

1. "No Man's Land" (Radio edit) - 3:15
2. "No Man's Land" (Acoustic version) - 3:08
3. "Love Calls Love" (Radio edit) - 3:22

== Charts ==
Chart performance for "No Man's Land"
Chart (2003)	Peak position
Australia (ARIA)	79

== Release history ==
Country	Date	Format	Label	Catalogue
Australia	5 May 2003	CD Single	Universal Music Australia	RSS0003
