= Don't Wanna Be the One =

Single by Midnight Oil

from the album Place Without a Postcard
- Released: October 1981
- Length: 3:04
- Label: Columbia
- Songwriters: Peter Garrett, Jim Moginie, Rob Hirst, Martin Rotsey
- Producer: Glyn Johns

Midnight Oil singles chronology
"Back on the Borderline" (1980)	"Don't Wanna Be the One" (1981)	"Armistice Day" (1981)

"Don't Wanna Be the One" is a song by Australian rock band Midnight Oil, released in October 1981 as the lead single from the band's third studio album, Place Without a Postcard. The song peaked at no. 40 in Australia.

== Track listing ==
1. "Don't Wanna Be the One" - 3:04
2. "Written in the Heart" - 5:54

== Charts ==
Chart (1981/82)	Peak position
Australian Singles Chart	40
