= Backsliders (band) =

Australian blues based band

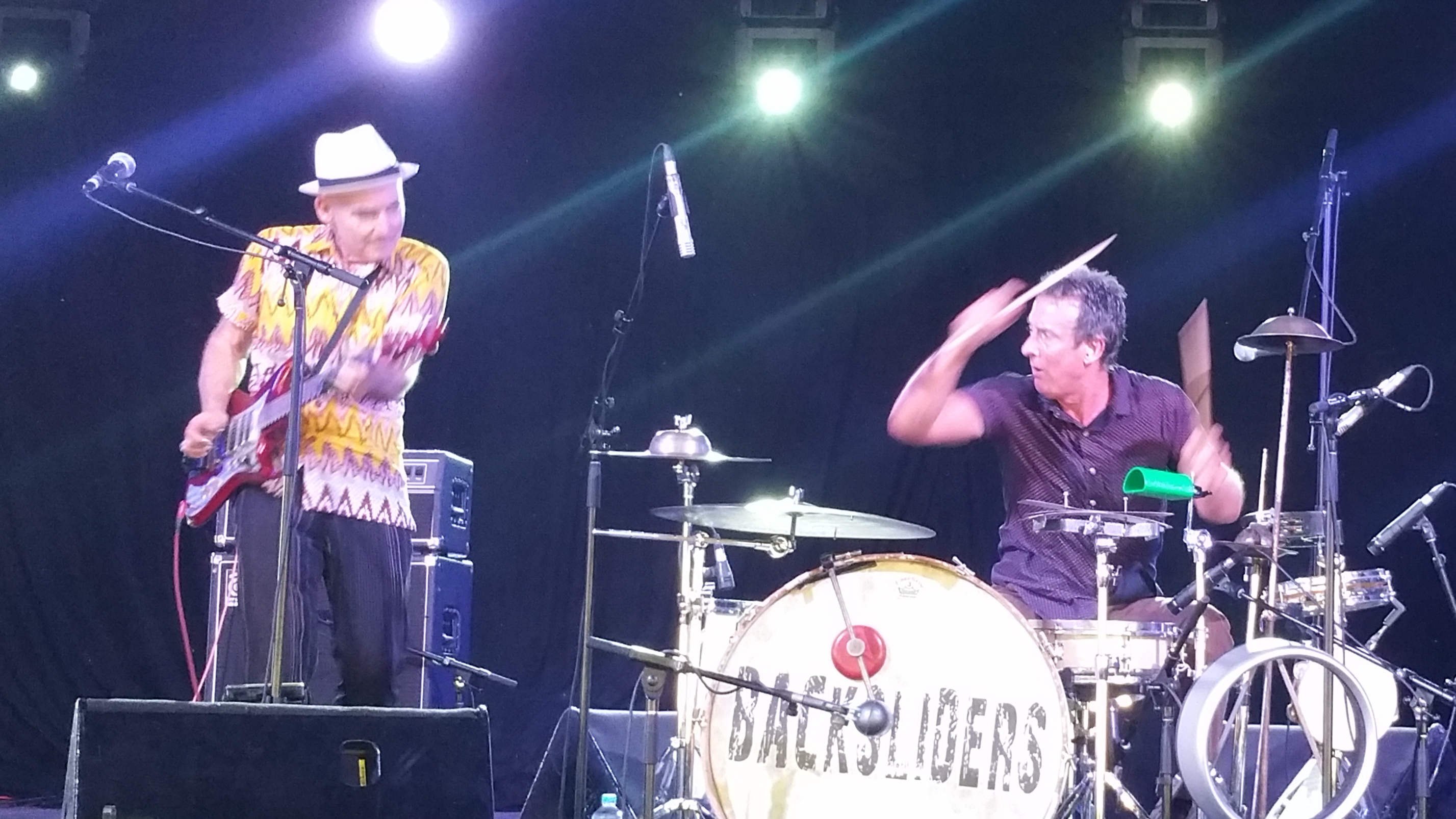
- Backsliders performing at Byron Bay Bluesfest in 2016

Background information
- Origin: Sydney, Australia
- Genre: Blues
- Years active: 1986–present
- Label: Rocket Distribution
- Members: Dom Turner; Ian Collard; Joe Glover
- Past members: Rob Hirst; Rex Hill; Pete Burgess; Jim Conway; Brod Smith
- Website: http://backsliders.com.au/

Backsliders are an Australian blues-based band. The current lineup consists of guitarist/vocalist and founding member Dom Turner, harmonica and banjo player, Joe Glover and drummers, Rosscoe Clark and Hamish Stuart.

== History ==
In the early 1980s, Dom Turner and harmonica player Rex Hill began gigging around Sydney as an acoustic blues duo. After returning from the United States in 1986, enthused by the idea of blurring the lines between rural and urban blues, Dom began rehearsing a new rural blues band concept with drummer Peter Burgess in duo mode, which moved to the inclusion of Rex Hill on harmonica. The sound drew inspiration from the Mississippi Fred McDowell records where Fred was accompanied by a drummer, or a rural blues version of the sound Beausoleil achieved without bass guitar.

After a short stint of rehearsals, and a run of early local gigs, the newly formed band was offered a live performance at the Sydney Town Hall for radio station 2MBS FM (host to the Stormy Monday blues program) by blues DJ Austin Harrison scheduled for August 1987. The band played in duo mode (Dom and Peter) and directly after the performance was approached by the station label manager with an offer of an album release to be the first blues album on the 2MBS FM music label. The debut album Preaching Blues was released in 1988. The band continued to gig locally in Sydney, particularly around the Balmain/Rozelle area of Sydney including a residency at the Bridge Hotel, Rozelle. In 1989 Rex Hill resigned from the band.

As both Dom and Pete were fans of Captain Matchbox Whoopee Band, Jim Conway was contacted as replacement for Rex. Jim agreed to join on harmonica (Jim had filled in for a Rex at a number of gigs in late 1988). A follow-up album Sitting on a Million was recorded and released in 1989 and the band quickly moved onto the Australian music festival circuit beginning with the Port Fairy Folk Festival, The East Coast Blues Festival and the Woodford Folk Festival as well as touring Australia, in particular travelling to Melbourne and regional Victoria as a strong live blues music circuit had developed in that region of Australia.

Throughout the 1990s the band continued on the touring circuit as well as playing a number of residency gigs in Sydney, including the Rose Shamrock and Thistle Hotel in Rozelle. The band also took advantage of the various television opportunities available to independent music acts in the 1990s, performing live on a variety of daytime and evening news and variety programs.

After meeting at a 1996 recording session for band The Ghostwriters, Dom became friends with drummer Rob Hirst, who was asked to join Backsliders. A very brief rehearsal followed and Rob and Dom agreed, officially joining in 2000, with the understanding that there were to be some upcoming Midnight Oil commitments. Drummers Angus Diggs and Ashley Davies filled the drum role during Rob's occasional absences. However, with the disbandment of Midnight Oil in 2002, Rob was able to focus on touring, writing and playing with Backsliders. In 2000, drummer Peter Burgess resigned.

In 2006, Jim Conway resigned from the group. Broderick Smith (Dingoes, Big Combo) and Ian Collard (Collard Greens and Gravy) took the harmonica role at alternate gigs. In 2010, Joe Glover (Shelley's Murder Boys) was added to the harmonica team.. Broderick Smith died on 20 April 2023.

Rob Hirst died on 20 January 2026

=== 2011–present ===
At the ARIA Music Awards of 2011, the band was nominated for Best Blues and Roots Album

Their 2020 album, Bonecrunch, was described by the Sydney Morning Herald as "in the hands of these vets the blues element isn’t staid, but is led down different, swampy paths to create something new and, indeed, hopeful."

Hirst died of pancreatic cancer on 20 January 2026.

== Discography ==
=== Studio albums ===
Title	Details
Preaching Blues	Released: 1988; Label: MBS Records (BLUES 1); Format: LP, Cassette
Sitting on a Million	Released: 1989; Label: Sanstock (SSM 038); Format: LP, Cassette
Hellhound	Released: 1991; Label: Sanstock (SSM 044); Format: LP, CD
Hellhound	Released: 1995; Label: Backsiders, Shock (BS1); Format: CD
Poverty Deluxe	Released: 1999; Label: Backsiders, Shock (BS3); Format: CD
Hanoi	Released: 2002; Label: Backsiders, Shock (BS4); Format: CD
Left Field Holler	Released: 2007; Label: Backsiders, Shock (BS6); Format: CD
Starvation Box	Released: 2011; Label: Backsiders, Shock (BS10); Format: CD, LP, DD
Dark Side	Released: 2014; Label: Backsiders, Shock (BS11); Format: CD, LP, DD
Heathen Songbook	Released: 2016; Label: Backsiders, Shock (BS12); Format: CD, LP, DD
Bonecrunch	Released: 2020; Label: Backsiders, Shock (BS13); Format: CD, LP, DD

=== Live albums ===
Title	Details
Live at The Royal	Released: 1992; Label: Blues Club Records (bcr 103 cd); Format: CD
Live	Released: 2005; Label: Backsiders, Shock (BS5); Format: CD

=== Compilation albums ===
Title	Details
Downtime (A Ten Year Collection)	Released: 1998; Label: Backsiders, Shock (BS2); Format: CD

=== Extended plays and singles ===
Title	Details
Throwbacks	Released: 2009; Label: Backsiders, Shock (BS57); Format: CD, DD
Taxpayer Blues	Released: 2025; Label: Backsiders; Format: Digital download, streaming

== Awards and nominations ==
=== ARIA Music Awards ===
The ARIA Music Awards is an annual awards ceremony that recognises excellence, innovation, and achievement across all genres of Australian music. They commenced in 1987.

Year	Nominee / work	Award	Result	Ref.
1999	Poverty Deluxe	Best Blues and Roots Album	Nominated	
2002	Hanoi	Best Blues and Roots Album	Nominated	
2011	Starvation Box	Best Blues and Roots Album	Nominated	

2002 Rhythms Magazine Readers' Poll 'Blues Album of the Year'

1998 Rhythms Magazine 'Blues Album of the Year' 1995 Blues on Air Magazine 'Best Live Australian Blues Act' 1994 Rolling Stone/Australian Blues Music Awards 'Band of the Year' 1994 Blues on Air Magazine 'Album of the Year' 1994 Rhythms Magazine 'Blues Album of the Year'
