= Diesel and Dust =

Studio album by Midnight Oil
- Released: August 1987
- Studio: Albert (Sydney)
- Genre: Alternative rock
- Length: 46:37
- Labels: Sprint, Columbia
- Producers: Warne Livesey, Midnight Oil

Midnight Oil chronology
Species Deceases (1985)	Diesel and Dust (1987)	Blue Sky Mining (1990)

Singles from Diesel and Dust
- 1. "The Dead Heart" Released: August 1986; 2. "Beds Are Burning" Released: 10 August 1987; 3. "Put Down That Weapon" Released: 7 December 1987; 4. "Dreamworld" Released: 1988

Diesel and Dust is the sixth studio album by Australian rock band Midnight Oil, released in August 1987 by SPRINT Music label under Columbia Records. Diesel and Dust was produced by Warne Livesey and the band. It is a concept album about the struggles of Indigenous Australians and environmental causes, issues important to the band. It drew inspiration from the Blackfella/Whitefella Tour of remote Indigenous communities with the Warumpi Band and Gondwanaland in 1986. The album peaked at No. 1 on the Australian Kent Music Report Albums Chart for six weeks.

Diesel and Dust has been critically lauded since its release. Rolling Stone editors named it the best album of 1988 (the year of its United States release), and later ranked it the 13th greatest record of the 1980s. In October 2010, Diesel and Dust was listed at number 1 in the book, 100 Best Australian Albums. In December 2021, the album was listed at no. 5 in Rolling Stone Australia's "200 Greatest Albums of All Time" countdown.

== Background ==
Midnight Oil spent several months in mid-1986 on the Blackfella/Whitefella Tour of outback Australia with indigenous music groups Warumpi Band and Gondwanaland, playing to remote Aboriginal communities and seeing first hand the seriousness of the issues in health and living standards. The tour was criticised by some journalists for being a one-off event instead of a long-term attempt to build bridges between communities. The band was galvanised by the experiences and made them the basis of their next album, Diesel and Dust, which was released in August 1987 and produced by Warne Livesey and the band. The album focused on the need for recognition by white Australia of past injustices involving the Aboriginal nation and the need for reconciliation. Peter Gifford left the band before the album's release due to extensive touring schedules, and was replaced on bass guitar by Bones Hillman, formerly of The Swingers. The track "Gunbarrel Highway" was not included on the United States version of the album, reportedly, because the line "shit falls like rain on a world that is brown" was deemed too offensive for US audiences.

Diesel and Dust peaked at No. 1 on the Australian albums charts for six weeks, No. 21 on the US Billboard 200 in 1988, and No. 19 on the UK Albums Chart. "Beds Are Burning" was their biggest international hit single, peaking at No. 6 in Australia, No. 17 on the US Billboard Hot 100 and No. 6 on the UK Singles Chart. "The Dead Heart" peaked at No. 4 in Australia, and charted on the Hot 100 and in the UK. "Put Down that Weapon" also charted in Australia, while "Dreamworld" charted on Billboard's Mainstream Rock Tracks and at No. 16 on its Modern Rock Tracks.

At the Australian Recording Industry Association (ARIA) 1988 Awards ceremony, Midnight Oil won "Best Cover Art" for Diesel and Dust. The album cover was designed by photographer Ken Duncan (b.1954, Mildura, VIC) and visual artist Wart (also known as Jen Waterhouse) (b.1958, Geelong, VIC). It also won "Best Single" and "Best Song" for "Beds Are Burning". A fracas developed between Gary Morris, their manager who was accepting awards for Midnight Oil, and former Countdown compere Ian Meldrum who was presenting: Meldrum objected to Morris making political commentary from the podium.

There were concerns about Diesel and Dust and Midnight Oil's attempts to express indigenous issues to white urban audiences – namely, the question "who holds the power to tell whose history?" The lyrics of "The Dead Heart" tell the story of colonisation from an indigenous point of view, but some critics felt they reinforced the "primitive" stereotype. Use of the bullroarer was criticised as belonging to sacred rituals, and therefore not appropriate for rock songs. "The Dead Heart" had been written in response to a request by organisers of the 1985 ceremony to return control of Uluru to its indigenous caretakers; Midnight Oil originally resisted being added to a concert bill that they believed should contain indigenous groups, but the organisers insisted, arguing that the band would reach a wider audience within the predominantly Caucasian urban centres. Midnight Oil requested that all royalties from the song go to indigenous communities. In addition, two indigenous groups, Warumpi Band and Gondwanaland, toured with them.

Hirst said, "There's been a kind of folky element in Midnight Oil for a very long time. I think you first heard it in songs like "Kosciusko", but it really burst forward when we did Diesel and Dust."

Following the 1988 American tour in support of Diesel and Dust with Australian band Yothu Yindi, Midnight Oil launched the Building Bridges album with various artists contributing, including Paul Kelly, Scrap Metal, Coloured Stone, Hunters & Collectors, James Reyne, The Saints, Crowded House, and INXS. All sales proceeds were donated to the National Coalition of Aboriginal Organisations.

== Reception ==
Professional ratings
Review scores
Source	Rating
AllMusic	4.5/5 stars
Daily Record	5/5 stars
The Encyclopedia of Popular Music	4/5 stars
Los Angeles Times	3/4 stars
PopMatters	9/10
Rolling Stone	4/5 stars
The Rolling Stone Album Guide	4.5/5 stars
The Village Voice	B+

According to Australian rock music historian Ian McFarlane, Midnight Oil "reached the peak of its powers with the release of the groundbreaking Diesel and Dust... [it] is arguably one of the greatest Australian albums of all time. Powerful, dynamic and passionate songs like 'Beds are Burning', 'Put Down that Weapon', 'Dreamworld', 'The Dead Heart' and 'Sell My Soul' were statements of intent and a call to action backed by the strength of their convictions". Mark Deming of AllMusic called the record "an artistic success and a triumph for leftist politics" which "makes clear that the bandmembers could apply their intelligence and passion to less aggressive material and still come up with forceful, compelling music".

== Track listing ==
All tracks are written by Peter Garrett, Rob Hirst, Jim Moginie, except where noted

Side one
No.	Title	Writer(s)	Length
1.	"Beds Are Burning"		4:14
2.	"Put Down That Weapon"		4:38
3.	"Dreamworld"		3:36
4.	"Arctic World"	Garrett, Moginie	4:21
5.	"Warakurna"	Moginie	4:38

Side two
No.	Title	Writer(s)	Length
6.	"The Dead Heart"		5:10
7.	"Whoah"	Garrett, Moginie	3:50
8.	"Bullroarer"		4:59
9.	"Sell My Soul"	Garrett, Moginie	3:35
10.	"Sometimes"		3:53

Not included on the vinyl and cassette releases or the original US CD release.
No.	Title	Writer(s)	Length
11.	"Gunbarrel Highway"	Garrett, Peter Gifford, Hirst, Moginie, Martin Rotsey	3:38

== Charts ==
=== Weekly charts ===
Chart (1987–1988)	Peak position
Australian Albums Kent Music Report	1
Canada Top Albums/CDs (RPM)	1
German Albums (Offizielle Top 100)	13
Dutch Albums (Album Top 100)	14
New Zealand Albums (RMNZ)	1
Swedish Albums (Sverigetopplistan)	5
Swiss Albums (Schweizer Hitparade)	7
UK Albums (Official Charts)	19
US Billboard 200	21

=== Year-end charts ===
Chart (1987)	Position
Australian Albums (Kent Music Report)	11
New Zealand Albums (RMNZ)	6
Chart (1988)	Position
Canadian Albums (RPM)	5
Dutch Albums (Album Top 100)	88
New Zealand Albums (RMNZ)	13
US Billboard 200	30

== Certifications ==
Region	Certification	Certified units/sales
Australia (ARIA)	7× Platinum	490,000^{^}
Canada (Music Canada)	3× Platinum	300,000^{^}
France (SNEP)	2× Platinum	600,000^{*}
Germany (BVMI)	Platinum	500,000^{^}
Netherlands (NVPI)	Gold	50,000^{^}
New Zealand (RMNZ)	Platinum	15,000^{^}
Sweden (GLF)	Gold	50,000^{^}
Switzerland (IFPI Switzerland)	2× Platinum	100,000^{^}
United Kingdom (BPI)	Gold	100,000^{^}
United States (RIAA)	Platinum	1,000,000^{^}
^{*} Sales figures based on certification alone.^{^} Shipments figures based on certification alone.

== Personnel ==
Midnight Oil

- Peter Garrett – lead and backing vocals
- Peter Gifford – bass and backing vocals
- Robert Hirst – drums, drum machine and backing vocals
- Jim Moginie – guitars, synthesizers, backing vocals and string arrangements
- Martin Rotsey – guitars

Additional musicians

- Glad Reed – trombone
- John Ockwell – cello
- Jeremy Smith – French horn

Production

- Midnight Oil – production
- Warne Livesey – production, additional keyboards
- Guy Gray – engineering
- Greg Henderson – engineering (6)
- Gary Morris – management (credited as "facilitator")
