= Armistice Day (song) =

Single by Midnight Oil

from the album Place Without a Postcard
- Released: May 1982
- Length: 4:28
- Label: Columbia
- Songwriters: Jim Moginie, Rob Hirst, Martin Rotsey
- Producer: Glyn Johns

Midnight Oil singles chronology
"Don't Wanna Be the One" (1981)	"Armistice Day" (1982)	"US Forces" (1982)

"Armistice Day" is a song by Australian rock band Midnight Oil, released in May 1982 as the second and final single from the band's third studio album, Place Without a Postcard. The song peaked at no. 31 in Australia.

== Track listing ==
1. "Armistice Day" - 4:28
2. "Stand in Line" (Live) - 5:54

== Charts ==
Chart (1982)	Peak position
Australian Singles Chart	31
