= Rob Hirst =

Australian musician (1955–2026)

Rob Hirst AM
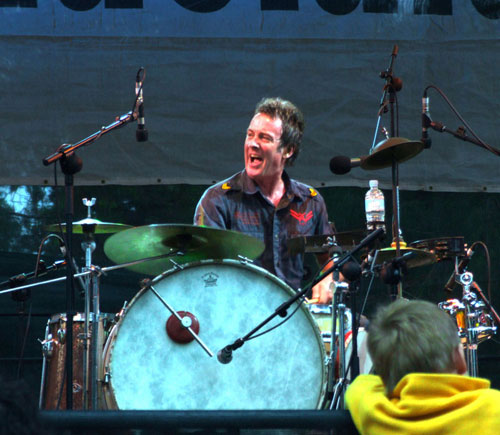
- Hirst performing with Backsliders in 2007

Background information
- Born: Robert George Hirst; 3 September 1955; Camden, New South Wales, Australia
- Died: 20 January 2026 (aged 70) New South Wales, Australia
- Genres: Rock; alternative rock; blues; delta blues; surf music
- Occupations: Musician; songwriter; producer
- Instruments: Drums; percussion; guitar; keyboards; vocals
- Years active: 1971–2026
- Labels: Virgin; Mercury; Sony BMG
- Formerly of: Midnight Oil; Ghostwriters; Backsliders
- Website: robhirst.com.au

Robert George Hirst (3 September 1955 – 20 January 2026) was an Australian musician from Camden, New South Wales. He was a founding member of the rock band Midnight Oil on drums, percussion and backing vocals (sometimes lead vocals) from the 1970s until the band took a hiatus in 2002. The band resumed performing and recording in 2017.

Hirst was also a member of the bands Ghostwriters, Backsliders, the Angry Tradesmen and the Break. He wrote a book, Willie's Bar & Grill, recounting the experiences on the tour Midnight Oil embarked on shortly after the September 11 terrorist attacks in 2001. His final project, the book World Is Almost at Peace was published in October 2026.

Six days after his death, Hirst was appointed a Member of the Order of Australia (AM) "for significant service to the performing arts through music" in the 2026 Australia Day Honours.

== Midnight Oil ==
In the early 1970s when schoolboys, Hirst and close friends Jim Moginie and Andrew "Bear" James played their first public performance at a school hall in Sydney's northern suburbs, under the name Schwampy Moose, playing mainly Beatles' covers. By 1976 the band had changed their name to Farm (Fucking All Right Mate). Hirst, now a student at the University of Sydney (BA/LLB), placed an advertisement in The Sydney Morning Herald for a singer to join the trio. The new line up of Peter Garrett (lead vocals), Hirst (drums and vocals), Moginie (guitar, keyboards, backing vocals) and James (bass guitar) were joined soon after by Martin Rotsey on guitar and their manager and sixth member, Gary Morris. The band changed their name to Midnight Oil.

With a blistering intensity to their live performances, the band's early music was a distinctive brand of surf punk. However, by the early 1980s the key songwriters in the band, Hirst, Moginie and Garrett, had become increasingly interested in the political issues of the day. This had a significant influence on their songwriting and soon spilled over into their live performances as the dynamic and outspoken Garrett used the stage as a platform for the band's views on issues including Aboriginal rights, nuclear disarmament and social justice.

In 1979, James left to be replaced by Peter Gifford. In 1987, after touring the outback and recording the band's best-known album, Diesel and Dust, Gifford suffered ill health and resigned. New bass player Bones Hillman (formerly of New Zealand band the Swingers) brought a new vocal dimension to the band. Midnight Oil continued to record and tour internationally for a further fifteen years, chalking up a final tally of fourteen albums and two extended plays before lead singer Garrett quit the group in December 2002 to take up a career in politics. The band resumed activity in 2017, including a world tour that year.

== Ghostwriters ==
In the mid-1990s, while Midnight Oil were taking a break, Hirst joined with guitarist Andrew Dickson and Hoodoo Gurus bass guitarist Rick Grossman to form a side project, Ghostwriters. The band released four albums, Ghostwriters (Virgin Records, 1991), Second Skin (Mercury Records, 1996), Fibromoon (self-released, 2000) and Political Animal (Sony BMG Australia, 2007).

== Backsliders ==
In 2000, Hirst joined Backsliders, an Australian blues group formed in 1986 whose members included founding member Dom Turner and harmonica players Brod Smith, Ian Collard and Joe Glover. The line-up with Hirst released six studio albums, one EP and a live DVD.

== Other musical projects ==
Turner and Hirst formed another band in 2002, the Angry Tradesmen, with the idea of taking the guitar/drum music of North Mississippi and blending it with the drum/bass music of the 1990s and experimental post-punk rock. Their only album, Beat the House, was released in 2008 and featured studio performances by Midnight Oil's Martin Rotsey. Hirst and Rotsey also play on the track "All Around the World" on Jim Moginie's 2006 solo album Alas Folkloric.

Other musical collaborations included working with Australia's Olympic athletes on a recording commissioned by SOCOG for the Sydney 2000 Olympics, and an unrelated collaboration with former Olympic athlete Paul Greene. Hirst and Greene released an album, In the Stealth of Summer, and a DVD, Hirst and Greene – Live at the Basement.

In 2010, Hirst, Moginie and Rotsey teamed up with Violent Femmes bass player Brian Ritchie and Hunters & Collectors trumpet player Jack Howard to form a new surf rock band, the Break. Their debut album, Church of the Open Sky, was released on 16 April 2010 on the independent Bombora label distributed by MGM. A tour of Australia followed. Their second album, Space Farm, was released on 15 March 2013, again followed by an Australian tour.

In 2015, Hirst collaborated on music with his eldest daughter, Jay O'Shea, of the band O'Shea. Hirst had given O'Shea up for adoption at a young age and it was through her birth mother and Hirst's bandmate from Midnight Oil, Bones Hillman, that the two eventually connected. The song "The Truth Walks Slowly " was the second time Hirst had collaborated with his children after previously having his younger two daughters complete backing vocals on his solo album.

== Personal life and death ==
Hirst had three daughters, including two with his wife, Leslie Holland. One of his daughters, Gabriella Hirst, is an artist. Another daughter, the singer Jay O'Shea, was born to a former girlfriend and given up for adoption. They reunited in 2010 and subsequently collaborated musically.

He grew up in the Sydney suburb of Mosman where he attended primary school with Allan Border.

Hirst was diagnosed with pancreatic cancer in April 2023. He died on 20 January 2026, at the age of 70.

== Discography ==
=== Albums ===
Title	Details	Peak chart positions
Title	Details	AUS
In the Stealth of Summer (as Hirst & Greene)	Released: March 2005; Label: ABC Roots Music (14182); Format: CD, CD+DVD, digital download	—
The Sun Becomes the Sea	Released: October 2014; Label: Rob Hirst; Format: CD, digital download	—
Crashing the Same Car Twice (with Sean Sennett)	Released: September 2015; Label: Sony (888751464020); Format: CD, digital download	—
The Lost and the Found (with Jay O'Shea)	Released: February 2020; Label: Sony (19439729962); Format: CD, digital download, streaming	—
Born Electric (with Sean Sennett)	Released: October 2025; Label: Self-released; Format: LP	78

=== Extended plays ===
Title	Details
Red Continent (with Jim Moginie and Hamish Stuart)	Released: 8 September 2023; Format: CD
A Hundred Years or More (with Jim Moginie and Hamish Stuart)	Released: 14 November 2025; Format: CD, digital

== Awards and nominations ==
=== APRA Awards ===
These annual awards were established by Australasian Performing Right Association (APRA) in 1982 to honour the achievements of songwriters and music composers and to recognise their song writing skills, sales and airplay performance, by its members annually. From 1982 to 1990, the best songs were given the Gold Award (also called the Special Award).

Year	Nominee / work	Award	Result
1989–90	"Beds Are Burning" (Peter Garrett, Robert Hirst, James Moginie)	Gold Award	Won
2001	"Beds Are Burning" (Garrett, Hirst, Moginie)	APRA Top 10 Australian songs	no. 3
2001	"Power and the Passion" (Hirst, Moginie, Garrett)	APRA Top 30 Australian songs	11–30
2018	Midnight Oil (Garrett, Hirst, Martin Rotsey, Moginie, Bones Hillman)	Ted Albert Award for Outstanding Services to Australian Music	awarded
2021	"Gadigal Land" (Joel Davison, Rob Hirst, Bunna Lawrie)	Song of the Year	Won
2022	"First Nation"	Song of the Year	Nominated

=== Country Music Awards of Australia ===
The Country Music Awards of Australia is an annual awards night held in January during the Tamworth Country Music Festival. Celebrating recording excellence in the Australian country music industry. They commenced in 1973.

Year	Nominee / work	Award	Result (wins only)	Ref.
2017	"The Truth Walks Slowly (In The Country Side)" O'Shea featuring Rob Hirst	Video of the Year	Won	
