= Jim Moginie =

Australian musician (born 1956)

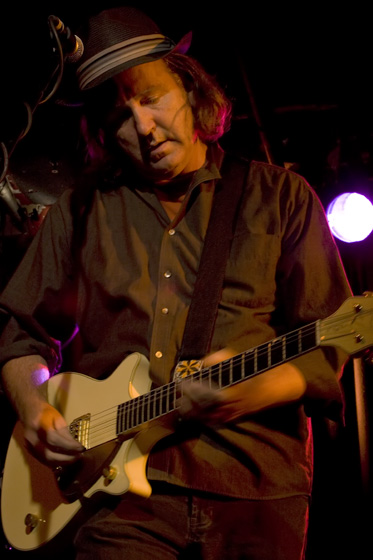
- Jim Moginie A Very Big Gig (benefit for Wayne Goodwin) The Basement, Sydney August 2008

Background information
- Born: James Moginie; 18 May 1956 (age 70); Paddington, New South Wales, Australia
- Genres: Rock, alternative rock
- Occupations: Musician, songwriter, producer
- Instruments: Guitar, keyboards, vocals
- Years active: 1971–present
- Labels: Virgin Music, Reverberama
- Member of: Midnight Oil

James 'Jim' Moginie (/mədʒiːni/) (born 18 May 1956) is an Australian musician. He is best known for his work with Midnight Oil, of which he was a founding member, guitarist, keyboardist, singer and leading songwriter.

== Career ==
In addition to Midnight Oil, Moginie has worked and performed with many notable musicians from Australia and New Zealand, including Silverchair, Sarah Blasko, End of Fashion, Backsliders, Neil Murray, Kasey Chambers and Neil Finn. Moginie has also played live with The Family Dog comprising different members at times, including Trent Williamson, Michael Iveson, Alex Hewetson, Kent Steedman, Paul Larsen Loughhead and Tim Kevin.

He has also released six solo works.

The four-track EP Fuzz Face was recorded in Moginie's small home studio with Midnight Oil's producer Nick Launay and released in 1996, with Midnight Oil bassist Bones Hillman contributing under the pseudonym "The Family Dog" – a term that Moginie would later use for his live band.

Alas Folkloric (2006) is Moginie's first full-length solo album and first release after Midnight Oil disbanded. The album features contributions from Martin Rotsey and Rob Hirst, as well as Paul Dempsey from the band Something for Kate on the track "Halfway Home", and was released through the Virgin Music label.

No Vans Mary (2010) by Shameless Seamus (Moginie's folk pseudonym) featured guest musicians including flugelhorn player Elizabeth Geyer, drummer Gus Bonic and bodhrán player Kevin Kelly. His interest in the traditional music of Ireland has deepened and his seven-piece band Shameless Seamus and The Tullamore Dews released the live in the studio Ballroom of Romance (2012.) Both were released through Moginie's Reverberama label. Moginie occasionally sings and plays bouzouki and guitar with a smaller group, The Tinkers, with core members Alan Healy (tenor banjo, bouzouki, vocals) and Evelyn Finnerty (fiddle, vocals).

In 2017 he released the EP Under The Motherland's Flag, in 2018 Perpetua and in 2019 Armies Of The Heart through Orchard, appearing as Triptych (2020) a three EP set on one CD available only through Reverberama. Most instruments were played by Moginie along with contributions by Lozz Benson (vocals and drums,) Sam Moginie (drums) and El Ninety (synthesizer and engineering.)

In 2023 he released an LP Murmurations played solo on electric guitar, inspired by the massive gatherings of starlings seen on winter evenings in Co. Carlow, Ireland. In 2024 he released the album 'Everything's Gonna Be Fine' recorded with drummer Hamish Start (with whom he toured later that year), Adam Ventoura (bass), Leah Flanagan (vocals), Seam Wayland (additional piano) and Colm Mac Ionamaire (5 string violin).,

Moginie was active in record production, co-producing Melbourne band The Fauves LP When Good Times Go Good released September 2008 and as a session player with Bill Chambers, Lyn Bowtell, Blind Valley, Leah Flanagan, Backsliders, New Christs, Jordan Leser, Catherine Britt, Angie Hart, Kate Plummer, Love Parade, Coloured Stone, The Aerial Maps and numerous others.

He has toured and recorded with Rob Hirst, Martin Rotsey and Brian Ritchie in The Break, whose surf rock album Church of the Open Sky was produced by Moginie and released on 16 April 2010 on the Bombora label, distributed by MGM. The band's second release Space Farm, a more adventurous work including Jack Howard on trumpet, was also produced by Moginie and was released worldwide on 15 March 2013 through the Sony Music label.

With Brian Ritchie, Moginie in 2013, 2014 and 2017 performed live with the ACO Underground (Australian Chamber Orchestra) in Sydney, London, Hong Kong, Los Angeles, Banff and New York City.

On 8 November 2017, during a performance as part of Midnight Oil's Great Circle Tour at The Sidney Myer Music Bowl in Melbourne, Moginie tore a hamstring during the last song of the main set. He finished the song but did not return for the encore.

In 2006, Midnight Oil was inducted into the ARIA Hall Of Fame. In 2018, APRA AMCOS announced that Midnight Oil were to be the recipients of the 2018 Ted Albert Award for Outstanding Services to Australian Music at the 2018 APRA Music Awards. In 2020 Midnight Oil received The Sydney Peace Prize Gold Medal for Human Rights in recognition of their relentless focus on human rights, and in particular for their environmental activism, their humanity and their drive to promote justice through both their music and their actions.

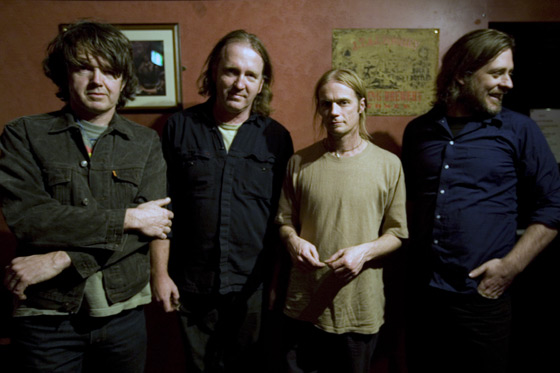
Jim Moginie and the Family Dog, The Harp Hotel August 2008. Photo: Mandy Hall

Moginie co-produced (with the Celibate Rifles' Kent Steedman) Bark Overtures (2018), released by Sony Music and Orchard with his band The Family Dog, comprising Steedman, Paul Larsen Loughhead (Celibate Rifles, New Christs, Ed Kuepper) Tim Kevin (Houlihan, Knievel, La Huva, Youth Group). The recording was produced at Jim's Oceanic Studio and recorded and mixed to analog tape. They toured nationally throughout the summer months 2018–19 in Australia with the Summer of the Dog tour.

After Midnight Oil reformed in 2017 for The Great Circle Tour from September to October 2019, they made The Makaratta Project EP and a full album, Resist, at Rancom Street Studios and Jim's Oceanic Studio. The former included collaborations with many Australian First Nations artists including Jessica Mauboy, Troy Cassar-Daly, Leah Flanagan, Ursula Yovich, Kaleena Briggs, Frank Yamma, Kev Carmody, Sammy Butcher (Warumpi Band,) Alice Skye, Tasman Keith and Dan Sultan. The latter was a 12-track album. The band embarked on its final "Resist" tour covering Australia, United States, Canada, Belgium, the Netherlands, Germany, United Kingdom, France and New Zealand with its final show at Sydney's Hordern Pavilion on 3 October 2022.

Moginie has been active working on and mixing music created in prisons, Songbirds 2 (male NSW prisoners) with early Midnight Oil alumni Murray Cook and Heart of a Woman (West Australian female indigenous prisoners) with prison music program administrator Angela Leech.

He co-produced Tjungu (2019) by Neil Murray and Sammy Butcher, suite of songs they co-wrote in the community of Papunya. Moginie also engineered, played and mixed the project at Mixmasters (Adelaide) with Mick Wordley, Red House (Alice Springs) with Jeff McLaughlin and Oceanic Studio with Brent Clark, longtime Moginie collaborator.

Moginie engineered and played on One Voice written by Rob Hirst, a tribute to Midnight Oil's Bones Hillman, who died in 2020. The project was named The Hillmans and comprised Hirst, Moginie, drummer Hamish Stuart with Martin Rotsey, Peter Garrett, Jay O'Shea and Warne Livesey. He went on with Hirst and Stuart as Hirst, Moginie, Stuart to record and play on 2023's Red Continent EP, and 2025's A Hundred Years or More both mixed by Livesey.

Other works include "The Blessing" (2004) and The Night Garden (2017) with flautist Howlin' Wind, and mixing and extra instrument duties on Wind's Symphony in F Minor (2022).

Moginie wrote a memoir called The Silver River which was released early 2024 through Harper Collins Australia, which describes his adoption story, Midnight Oil's history and his deep dive into traditional Irish music. "What elevates Moginie's memoir onto a rare plane of literary achievement and impact is the quiet, calm and tentative manner by which he is able to translate adoption – that most alien of human experiences – into a form that can be easily perceived, understood and felt by the rest of us. It is a patient work of great beauty, and its final sentence is breathtaking."

== Discography ==
=== Albums ===
List of albums, with selected details
Title	Details	Peak chart positions
Title	Details	AUS
The Blessing (with Howlin' Wind)	Released: 2004; Format: CD; Label: Reverberama	—
Alas Folkloric	Released: 2006; Format: CD; Label: EMI / Virgin (0946 3704852 8)	—
No Vans Mary (as Shameless Seamus)	Released: 2010; Format: CD; Label: Reverberama (SS001)	—
Ballroom of Romance (as Shameless Seamus and the Tullamore Dews)	Released: 2012; Format: CD; Label: Reverberama	—
The Colour Wheel For 6 Guitars (as Moginie Electric Guitar Orchestra)	Released: 2014; Format: CD, 2×LP; Label: Reverberama (R04)	—
The Night Garden (with Howlin' Wind)	Released: 2017; Format: Digital; Label: Reverberama	—
Bark Overtures (as Jim Moginie and The Family Dog)	Released: 2018; Format: CD, LP; Label: Jim Moginie (BARK0001)	—
Triptych	Released: 2019; Format: Digital; Label: Reverberama	—
Murmurations	Released: April 2023; Format: CD, digital; Label: Reverberama (JM003)	—
Thunk (as Jim Moginie and The Family Dog)	Released: 12 December 2025; Format: CD, LP, cassette; Label: Songland (Rev-15)	26

=== Extended plays ===
List of EPs, with selected details
Title	Details
Red Continent (with Rob Hirst and Hamish Stuart)	Released: 8 September 2023; Format: CD
A Hundred Years or More (with Rob Hirst and Hamish Stuart)	Released: 14 November 2025; Format: CD, digital; Label: Eleven
