= Amanda Palmer discography =

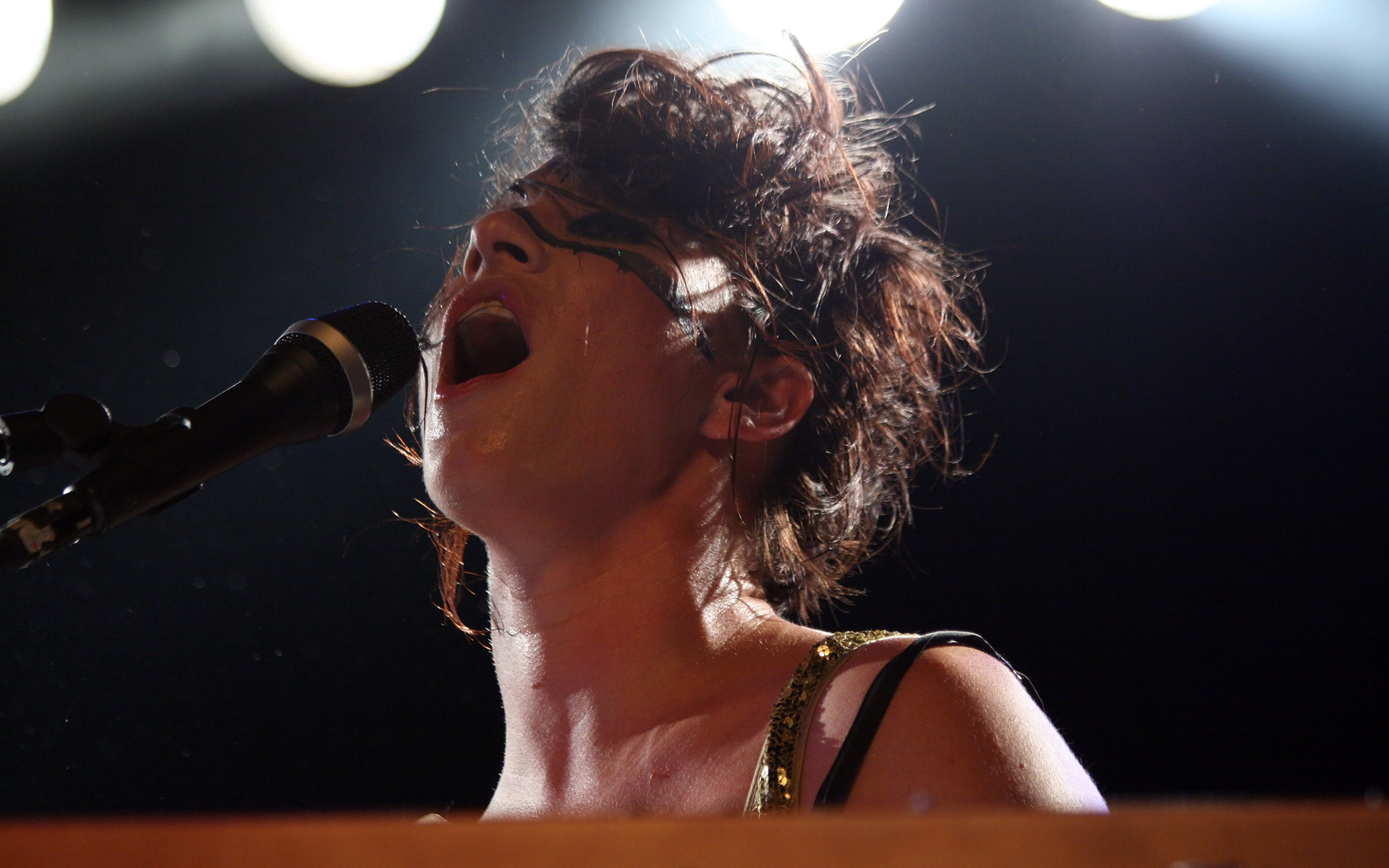
- Amanda Palmer performing in Vienna, Austria, 2011
- Studio albums: 6
- EPs: 5
- Live albums: 5
- Singles: 35
- Music videos: 42
- Remix albums: 2
- Promotional singles: 22

The discography of American singer, songwriter, and author Amanda Palmer consists of three solo studio albums, three collaborative studio albums, five extended plays, five live albums, two remix albums, two demo albums, 42 music videos, 35 singles, and 22 promotional singles. She also has released two studio albums, two compilation albums, one extended play, one live album, and eight singles as a member of the band The Dresden Dolls; one studio album and one extended play as a member of the duo Evelyn Evelyn, and one extended play as a member of the group 8in8.

== Solo artist ==
=== Albums ===
==== Studio albums ====
List of albums, with selected information
Title	Album details	Peak chart positions						
Title	Album details	US	US Indie	US Alt.	US Rock	AUS	AUT	SCO
Who Killed Amanda Palmer	Released: September 16, 2008; Label: Roadrunner; Formats: CD, digital download, LP	77	—	3	—	—	—	—
Theatre Is Evil (with the Grand Theft Orchestra)	Released: September 7, 2012; Label: 8 Ft.; Formats: CD, digital download, LP	10	3	18	8	34	—	—
There Will Be No Intermission	Released: March 8, 2019; Label: 8 Ft., Cooking Vinyl; Formats: CD, digital download, LP	169	3	14	33	— (Note: There Will Be No Intermission did not enter the ARIA Albums Chart, but peaked at number 40 on the ARIA Digital Album Chart.)	30	49

==== Collaborative studio albums ====
List of albums, with selected information
Title	Album details	Peak chart positions
Title	Album details	US Folk
You Got Me Singing (with Jack Palmer)	Released: July 15, 2016; Label: 8 Ft., Cooking Vinyl; Formats: CD, digital download, LP	16
I Can Spin a Rainbow (with Edward Ka-Spel)	Released: May 5, 2017; Label: 8 Ft., Cooking Vinyl; Formats: CD, digital download, LP	—
Amanda Palmer & Friends Present Forty-Five Degrees: Bushfire Flash Record (with Brian Viglione, Clare Bowditch, Fred Leone, Missy Higgins, Jherek Bischoff, & Montaigne)	Released: February 21, 2020; Label: 8 ft.; Formats: Digital download	—

==== Live albums ====
List of albums, with selected information
Title	Album details	Peak chart positions		
Title	Album details	US Indie	US Current	AUS
Amanda Palmer Goes Down Under	Released: January 21, 2011; Label: Liberator (AUS & NZ) 8 ft. (Worldwide); Formats: CD, digital download	50	—	25
Several Attempts to Cover Songs by The Velvet Underground & Lou Reed for Neil Gaiman as His Birthday Approaches	Released: April 10, 2012; Label: 8 ft.; Formats: CD	—	—	—
An Evening With Neil Gaiman & Amanda Palmer	Released: November 19, 2013; Label: 8 Ft.; Formats: CD, digital download, LP	32	191	—
I Can Spin a Rainbow (Live in Vienna)(with Edward Ka-Spel & Patrick Q. Wright)	Released: June 29, 2017; Label: 8 Ft.; Formats: streaming (SoundCloud exclusive)	—	—	—
Ninja TED: A benefit for the Vancouver Food Bank	Released: June 29, 2019; Label: 8 Ft.; Formats: streaming (Bandcamp exclusive)	—	—	—

==== Remix albums ====
List of albums, with selected information
Title	Album details
Map of Tasmania: The Remix Project (With The Young Punx & Peaches)	Released: February 20, 2010; Label: MofoHiFi; Format: Digital download
Piano Is Evil	Released: July 27, 2017; Label: 8 Ft.; Formats: CD, digital download, LP

==== Demos ====
- Songs from 1989–1995... (1996)
- Summer 1998 Five Song Demo (1997)

=== Extended plays ===
List of EPs, with selected information
Title	EP details
Amanda Palmer Performs the Popular Hits of Radiohead on Her Magical Ukulele	Released: July 20, 2010; Label: 8 Ft.; Format: Digital download
Selections from Theatre Is Evil	Released: September 2012; Label: 8 Ft.; Format: Digital download
Strung Out In Heaven: A Bowie String Quartet (with Jherek Bischoff)	Released: February 5, 2016; Label: 8 Ft.; Formats: Digital download, vinyl
Sketches For the Musical Jib (with Jason Webley)	Released: September 13, 2016; Label: 8 Ft.; Formats: Digital download, vinyl
The Hands EP (with Edward Ka-Spel)	Released: May 2017; Label: 8 Ft.; Formats: 7-inch vinyl
New Zealand Survival Songs	Released: January 11, 2024; Label: 8 Ft.; Formats: Digital download

=== Singles ===
Title	Year	Album
"Leeds United"	2008	Who Killed Amanda Palmer
"Oasis"	2009	Who Killed Amanda Palmer
"Do You Swear to Tell the Truth the Whole Truth and Nothing but the Truth So Help Your Black Ass"^{1}	2010	Non-album single
"Idioteque" (Radiohead cover)	2010	Amanda Palmer Performs the Popular Hits of Radiohead on Her Magical Ukulele
"Map of Tasmania" (featuring The Young Punx)	2010	Amanda Palmer Goes Down Under
"On an Unknown Beach"	2010	Amanda Palmer Goes Down Under
"In My Mind" (featuring Brian Viglione)	2011	Amanda Palmer Goes Down Under
"Ukulele Anthem" ^{1}	2011	Non-album single
"Polly" (Nirvana cover)	2012	Newermind
"Want It Back" (with the Grand Theft Orchestra)	2012	Theatre Is Evil
"Do It with a Rockstar" (with the Grand Theft Orchestra)	2012	Theatre Is Evil
"The Killing Type" (with the Grand Theft Orchestra)	2012	Theatre Is Evil
"The Bed Song" (with the Grand Theft Orchestra)	2013	Theatre Is Evil
"The Angel Gabriel"	2014	Non-album single
"All I Could Do" (Kimya Dawson cover) (with Jack Palmer)	2015	You Got Me Singing
"1952 Vincent Black Lightning" (Richard Thompson cover) (with Jack Palmer)	2016	You Got Me Singing
"Purple Rain" (Prince cover) (with Jherek Bischoff)	2016	Non-album singles
"Laura" (Bat for Lashes cover) (with Brendan Maclean)	2016	Non-album singles
"On the Door" (with Brendan Maclean)	2016	Non-album singles
"Everybody Knows" (Leonard Cohen cover) (with Jherek Bischoff)	2016	Non-album singles
"Democracy" (Leonard Cohen cover) (with Neil Gaiman)	2016	Non-album singles
"In Harm's Way" (with Jherek Bischoff)	2017	Non-album singles
"Mother" (Pink Floyd cover) (with Jherek Bischoff)	2017	Non-album singles
"How Would You Like to Play God?" (with Jherek Bischoff)	2017	Non-album singles
"Labyrinth (from The Grinning Man)" (with The Budapest Film Orchestra)	2017	Non-album singles
"Quartet for Dolores" (with Jherek Bischoff)	2018	Non-album singles
"The Mess Inside" (with Sxip Shirey and Rachel Jayson)	2018	I Only Listen to the Mountain Goats
"Mr. Weinstein Will See You Now" (with Jasmine Power)	2018	Non-album singles
"House of Eternal Return" (with Jason Webley)	2018	Non-album singles
"Electric Blanket" (with Jason Webley)^{1}	2018	Non-album singles
"Drowning in the Sound"	2018	There Will Be No Intermission
"Voicemail for Jill"	2019	There Will Be No Intermission
"Everybody Knows Somebody"	2019	Non-album single
"Beds Are Burning" (featuring Missy Higgins, Brian Viglione, and Jherek Bischoff)	2020	Amanda Palmer & Friends Present Forty-Five Degrees: Bushfire Charity Flash Record
"It's a Fire" (Portishead cover)(with Rhiannon Giddens)	2020	Non-album single

==== Promotional singles ====
Title	Year	Album
"I Google You (Live)"^{2}	2008	Who Killed Amanda Palmer
"Three Men Hanging (Live in Portland)" (with Murder by Death featuring Zoë Keating & Lyndon Chester)	2009	7 Series (Part 3)
"János vs Wonderland"(with Tristan Allen)	2010	Non-album singles
"Bigger on the Inside (Demo)" (feat. Zoe Keating)^{3}	2015	Non-album singles
"The Thing About Things (Demo)"^{3}	2015	Non-album singles
"So Much Wine" (with Jack Palmer)	2015	Non-album singles
"Grown Man Cry (2007 Piano Demo)"^{4}	2015	Non-album singles
"Raggin' on the Man (Bottomfeeder Demo)"^{4}	2015	Non-album singles
"The Sound of People Dancing" (with Thor & Friends)	2016	Non-album singles
"Machete (Demo)" ^{3}	2016	Non-album singles
"A Mother's Confession (Demo)" ^{3}		Non-album singles
"Drowning in the Sound (Demo)"^{3}	2017	Non-album singles
"Floating in a Cocktail Glass"	2017	Non-album singles
"Beyond the Beach" (with Edward Ka-Spel)	2017	I Can Spin a Rainbow
"Rainbow's End" (with Edward Ka-Spel)	2017	I Can Spin a Rainbow
"The Clock at the Back of the Cage" (with Edward Ka-Spel)	2017	I Can Spin a Rainbow
"Small Hands, Small Heart (Demo)"	2017	Non-album singles
"Strength Through Music 2018"	2018	Non-album singles
"Judy Blume (Demo)"^{3} ^{1}	2018	Non-album singles
"Anti-Ukulele Anthem" (with Andrew O'Neill)	2018	Non-album singles
"Later You Told Me"	2019	Non-album singles
"The French Brexit Song" (with Sarah-Louise Young, and Maxim Melton)	2019	Non-album singles
"Star of Wonder" (The Roches cover)	2019	Non-album singles
"A Nightingale Sang in Berkeley Square" (with the BBC Symphony Orchestra)	2020	Non-album singles
"City Hall" (with Jason Webley)	2020	Non-album singles

Notes:

1. Live version appeared on An Evening with Neil Gaiman & Amanda Palmer
2. Included as a pre-order bonus on Who Killed Amanda Palmer but not on the main track list
3. Studio version appeared on There Will Be No Intermission
4. Studio version appeared on Theatre Is Evil

=== Audiobook narration ===
- The Art of Asking: How I Learned to Stop Worrying and Let People Help (2014)[ISBN unspecified]

=== DVDs ===
- Who Killed Amanda Palmer: A Collection of Music Videos (2009)

=== Music videos ===
Title	Director	Year
"'Who Killed Amanda Palmer? Video Series' Part 1: Intro"	Michael Pope	2008
"Part 2: Astronaut"	Michael Pope	2008
"Part 3: Ampersand"	Michael Pope	2008
"Part 4: Runs in the Family"	Michael Pope	2008
"Part 5: The Point of It All"	Michael Pope	2008
"Part 6: Strength Through Music"	Michael Pope	2008
"Part 7: Guitar Hero"	Michael Pope	2008
"Part 8: Another Year (Credits)"	Michael Pope	2008
"Part 9: Everybody's Gotta Live (Epilogue)" (Love Cover)	Michael Pope	2008
"Oasis"	Michael Pope	2009
"Leeds United"	Alex de Campi	2009
"What's the Use of Wond'rin'?" (feat. St. Vincent)	Michael Pope	2009
"Blake Says" (feat. the Danger Ensemble)	Steven Mitchell Wright	2009
"János vs Wonderland" (with Tristan Allen)	Sam Lara & Steven Mitchell Wright	2010
"Map of Tasmania" (feat. The Young Punx)	Michael Pope	2011
"On an Unknown Beach" (Peter Jefferies cover)	János Szász	2011
"In My Mind" (feat. Brian Viglione)	Jim Batt	2011
"No Surprises" (Radiohead cover)" (Marcos Sanchez animation)	Ron Eyal	2011
"Polly (Nirvana cover)"	Michael Pope	2012
"Want It Back"	Jim Batt	2012
"The Killing Type"	Tim Pope	2012
"Do It With a Rockstar"	Wayne Coyne, Amanda Palmer, George Salisbury, & Michael McQuilken	2012
"The Bed Song"	Michael McQuilken	2013
"1952 Vincent Black Lightning" (with Jack Palmer) (animation)	David Mack	2016
"Laura (Bat for Lashes cover)" (with Brendan Maclean)	Larry Heath	2016
"Wynken, Blynken & Nod" (with Jack Palmer)	Jim Batt	2016
"Wynken, Blynken & Nod (animation)" (with Jack Palmer)	Chiara Ambrosio	2016
"The Angel Gabriel"	Tousaint Avila	2016
"Floating in a Cocktail Glass" (Patreon video)	Julie Atlas Muz & Karl Giant	2017
"Beyond the Beach (animation)"	Chiara Ambrosio	2017
"The Clock at the Back of the Cage" (with Edward Ka-Spel)	Christy Louise Flaws, Chris Bennett, & Luke O'Connor	2017
"Grown Man Cry"	Steven Mitchell Wright	2017
"In Harm's Way"	Abel Azcona	2017
"Mother (Pink Floyd cover)" (with Jherek Bischoff)	Jordan Rathus	2017
"The Mess Inside (The Mountain Goats cover)" (with Sxip Shirley & Rachel Jayson feat. Coco Karol)	Amanda Palmer & Hayley Rosenblum	2018
"Judy Blume"	Jason Webley	2018
"Strength Through Music 2018"	Michael Pope	2018
"Pulp Fiction (animation)" (with Edward Ka-Spel)	David Mack	2018
"Mr. Weinstein will See You Now" (with Jasmine Power)	Noemie Lafrance	2018
"Electric Blanket" (with Jason Webley)	Hoku Uchiyama	2018
"Anti-Ukulele Anthem" (with Andrew O'Neill)	Andrew O'Neill	2018
"Voicemail For Jill"	Amber Sealey	2019
"Drowning in the Sound"	Michael Pope	2019
"The French Brexit Song"	Dan Allen	2019

== As part of The Dresden Dolls ==
- The Dresden Dolls (2002)
- A Is for Accident (2003) (live album)
- The Dresden Dolls (2003, reissued 2004)
- Yes, Virginia... (2006)
- No, Virginia... (2008) (compilation)
- The Virginia Monologues (2015) (compiles Yes, Virginia... and No, Virginia...)

== As part of Evelyn Evelyn ==
- Elephant Elephant (EP) (2007)
- Evelyn Evelyn (2010)

== As part of 8in8 ==
- Nighty Night (with Damian Kulash, Neil Gaiman & Ben Folds) (2011)

== Other appearances ==
Title	Year	Other artist(s)	Album
"Trudy"	2003	Ad Frank and the Fast Easy Women	In Girl Trouble
"Circus Freak Love Triangle"	2005	Hierosonic	Pornos and Razorblades
"Warsaw is Khelm"	2006	Golem	Fresh off Boat
"Life"	2006	...And You Will Know Us by the Trail of Dead	So Divided
"Eight Days of Hell"	2006	...And You Will Know Us by the Trail of Dead	So Divided
"Witch's Web"	2006	...And You Will Know Us by the Trail of Dead	So Divided
"The Lovers"	2006	Meredith Yayanos	Brainwaves
"Stuck with You"	2007	Voltaire	Ooky Spooky
"Everybody Hurts"	2007	Cormac Bride	Stereogum Presents...: A Tribute to Automatic For the People
"Black Versus White"	2009	Apoptygma Berzerk	Rocket Science
"Living in Misery"	2009	Kill Hannah	Wake Up the Sleepers
"Behavior" (Steel Train cover)	2010	Matt Devine & Erica Iozzo	Terrible Tactics Vol. 1
"János vs Wonderland"	2010	Tristan Allen	Tristan Allen EP
"The Little Prince"	2011	Lance Horne	First Things Last
"Such Great Heights" (The Postal Service cover)	2011	Kim Boekbinder	Such Great Heights
"The First Time Ever I Saw Your Face"	2011	The Flaming Lips	Non-album singles
"Magicfuturebox"	2012	Jherek Bischoff	The Few Moments
"Total Control"	2012	Hugo Race	Non-album single
"Institutionalized"	2012	The Grand Theft Orchestra	A Tribute to Repo Man
"First World Problems"	2014	"Weird Al" Yankovic	Mandatory Fun
"Before Too Long"	2014	Missy Higgins	Oz
"You and Him"	2015	John Grant	Grey Tickles, Black Pressure
"Pictures of Me" (Elliott Smith cover)	2016	N/A	Say Yes!
"The Leary Cloud (Slight Return)"	2017	Edward Ka-Spel	High on Station Yellow Moon
"No-one Can Hear You Squeak"	2017	Edward Ka-Spel	High on Station Yellow Moon
"Stuck On My Eyes"	2017	Edward Ka-Spel	High on Station Yellow Moon
"The Scream"	2017	Edward Ka-Spel & Patrick Q Wright	Asylum Relapse: A tale of four worlds
"Boys in the Band"	2018	Jinkx Monsoon	The Ginger Snapped
"Fighter"	2018	Patty Monroe	Malatjie
"Midnight Deal"	2020	The Prison Music Project, Zoe Boekbinder, Jacob John Allen, Ani DiFranco, Kevin O’Donnell	Long Time Gone
"Millennium Actress"	2022	...And You Will Know Us by the Trail of Dead	XI: Bleed Here Now
