= Sometimes (Midnight Oil song) =

Single by Midnight Oil

from the album Scream in Blue
- Released: April 1992
- Recorded: Our Common Future Concert, Darlinghurst, 1989
- Length: 3:39
- Label: Columbia
- Songwriters: Rob Hirst, Jim Moginie Peter Garrett
- Producers: Midnight Oil & Keith Walker

Midnight Oil singles chronology
| "One Country" (1991) | "Sometimes" (1992) | "Beds Are Burning" (1992) |

"Sometimes" is a song by Australian rock band Midnight Oil, from their sixth studio album Diesel and Dust, released in 1987.

A live recording from 1989 was released in April 1992, as the lead single from the band's compilation of live recordings album, Scream in Blue. The song peaked at number 33 in Australia.

== Track listing ==
CD single
| No. | Title | Writer(s) | Length |
|---|---|---|---|
| 1. | "Sometimes" (live) | Hirst, Moginie, Garrett | 3:39 |
| 2. | "Wharf Rat" | Jerry Garcia, Robert Hunter | 6:05 |

CD Maxi
| No. | Title | Writer(s) | Length |
|---|---|---|---|
| 1. | "Sometimes" (live) | Hirst, Moginie, Garrett | 3:39 |
| 2. | "Used And Abused" (live) | Hirst, Moginie | 3:33 |
| 3. | "Written in the Heart" (live) | Hirst, Moginie, Martin Rotsey | 3:20 |
| 4. | "No Reaction" (live) | Hirst, Moginie, Rotsey | 3:00 |
| 5. | "Wharf Rat" | Garcia, Hunter | 6:05 |

== Charts ==
| Chart (1992) | Peak position |
|---|---|
| Australia (ARIA) | 33 |
| US Alternative Airplay (Billboard) | 20 |
