= Amanda Palmer & Friends Present Forty-Five Degrees: Bushfire Flash Record =

Amanda Palmer & Friends Present Forty-Five Degrees: Bushfire Charity Flash Record

Studio album by Amanda Palmer
- Released: February 21, 2020
- Studio: Sing Sing Studios in Melbourne, Australia
- Genre: Baroque pop; Alternative rock; Punk cabaret; Folk rock
- Length: 37:50
- Label: 8 ft.
- Producer: Anna Laverty; Xanthea O'Connor

Amanda Palmer chronology
There Will Be No Intermission (2019)	Amanda Palmer & Friends Present Forty-Five Degrees: Bushfire Charity Flash Record (2020)

Singles from Amanda Palmer & Friends Present Forty-Five Degrees: Bushfire Flash Record
- 1. "Beds Are Burning" Released: February 17, 2020

Amanda Palmer & Friends Present Forty-Five Degrees: Bushfire Charity Flash Record is a collaborative studio album by American singer-songwriter Amanda Palmer along with Brian Viglione, Clare Bowditch, Fred Leone, Missy Higgins, Jherek Bischoff, and Montaigne. It was released to digital retailers and streaming platforms on February 21, 2020. Released in response to the 2019–20 Australian bushfire season, all proceeds of the album will be donated to Firesticks Alliance, an Indigenous Australian-led organization "re-invigorating and teaching cultural land burning and management." The album was funded by Palmer's supporters on Patreon.

== Promotion ==
A cover of Midnight Oil's "Beds Are Burning" featuring Missy Higgins, Brian Viglione and Jherek Bischoff was released as a single on February 17, 2020. A benefit concert featuring Palmer and her then-husband Neil Gaiman was held in Melbourne, Australia on March 8, 2020.

== Track listing ==
Track listing for Amanda Palmer & Friends Present Forty-Five Degrees: Bushfire Flash Record
No.	Title	Writer(s)	Length
1.	"My Favorite Things" (Bushfire edition)	Richard Rodgers; Oscar Hammerstein II; Amanda Palmer	3:08
2.	"Beds Are Burning" (featuring Missy Higgins, Brian Viglione and Jherek Bischoff)	Rob Hirst; Jim Moginie; Peter Garrett	4:42
3.	"The Drover's Boy"	Ted Egan	4:51
4.	"Black Smoke" (featuring Clare Bowditch and Jherek Bischoff)	Emily Wurramara	4:05
5.	"Suck It Up, Buttercup"	Palmer	8:52
6.	"Truganini" (featuring Montaigne, Brian Viglione and Jherek Bischoff)	Garrett; Hirst; Moginie; Martin Rotsey; W. Stevens	4:41
7.	"Solid Rock" (with Fred Leone)	Shane Howard	4:21
8.	"Regional Echo"	Jen Cloher	4:49
Total length:			37:50

== Personnel ==
Musicians

- Amanda Palmer – vocals (all tracks), piano (all tracks), autoharp (track 2), drums (track 3)
- Brian Viglione – drums (tracks 2, 6–8), tambourine (track 8)
- Jherek Bischoff – electric bass (tracks 2, 6, 8), guitar (tracks 2, 8), upright bass (tracks 4, 6, 7)
- Clare Bowditch – vocals (track 4)
- Montaigne – vocals (track 6)
- Fred Leone – didjeridoo (track 7)

Technical

- Artwork: Sarah Beetson
- Album layout: Andrew Nelson
- Engineer, co-producer, mixing: Anna Laverty at Sing Sing Studios in Melbourne, Australia
- Mix assistant: Gabby Crump and James Taplin
- Drum engineering: Jaron Luksa at The Rattle Room in Burbank, California
- Drum engineering assistants: Rylan Sunseri, Nathaniel Sellin, and Kahari Mays
- Bass and guitar engineering: Jherek Bischoff at Sweethaven in Los Angeles, CA
- Mastering: Ross Cockle at Sing Sing Studios
- Guest A&R, advisor, and co-producer: Xanthea O'Connor
