= Scream in Blue =

Live album by Midnight Oil
- Released: May 1992
- Recorded: 1982–1990
- Genre: Rock
- Length: 59:59
- Label: Sprint Music / Columbia Records
- Producers: Midnight Oil & Keith Walker

Midnight Oil chronology
The Green Disc (1990)	Scream in Blue (1992)	Earth and Sun and Moon (1993)

Singles from Scream in Blue
- 1. "Sometimes" Released: April 1992; 2. "Beds Are Burning" Released: July 1992

Scream in Blue is a live album by Midnight Oil that was released in May 1992 under the Columbia Records label. It contains songs carefully culled from 5 live concerts recorded over a 9-year period. The audiences sound quite large, but also included is material from a 1990 protest concert held on the street in front of Exxon headquarters in New York City. The album is mixed so as to sound like one continuous concert.

The album starts with a scathing, nearly atonal electric guitar solo and never lets up (until the final, more subdued studio bonus track "Burnie"), careening through a hooky hard-rock minefield of clever, socially conscious lyrics sung with passion over a rip-roaring but very tight band. The tracks were evidently recorded through the sound systems of the various concerts, then mixed to a clear and well-balanced sound in the style of audio verité. Also, at the end of "Only the Strong", a short sound sample is inserted containing some chanting taken from "The Drum Song" with permission from Phil Fontaine.

== Reception ==
Professional ratings
Review scores
Source	Rating
AllMusic	link
Rolling Stone	link

Allmusic's review by Roch Parisien is in praise of the album, saying that it perfectly captured the edge and power of Midnight Oil's live performances, which consistently outshone the popular studio versions of the same material.

== Track listing ==
1. "Scream in Blue" 2:56 (Garrett, Moginie, Rotsey) - Hordern Pavilion, Sydney, 1984
2. "Read About It" 3:52 (Garrett, Hirst, Moginie) - Brisbane Entertainment Centre, 1990
3. "Dreamworld" 3:42 (Garrett, Hirst, Moginie) - Brisbane Entertainment Centre, 1990
4. "Brave Faces" 5:00 (Garrett, Moginie) - Capitol Theatre, Sydney, 1982
5. "Only the Strong" 5:41 (Hirst, Moginie) - Capitol Theatre, Sydney, 1982
6. "Stars of Warburton" 5:04 (Garrett, Moginie) - Brisbane Entertainment Centre, 1990
7. "Progress" 6:17 (Garrett, Moginie) - Exxon Protest, 6th Ave, New York City, 1990
8. "Beds Are Burning" 4:05 (Garrett, Hirst, Moginie) - Our Common Future Concert, Darlinghurst, 1989
9. "Sell My Soul" 4:10 (Garrett, Moginie) - Brisbane Entertainment Centre, 1990
10. "Sometimes" 3:29 (Garrett, Hirst, Moginie) - Our Common Future Concert, Darlinghurst, 1989
11. "Hercules" 4:57 (Garrett, Hirst, Moginie) - Brisbane Entertainment Centre, 1990
12. "Powderworks" 5:50 (Garrett, Hirst, James, Moginie, Rotsey) - Capitol Theatre, Sydney, 1982
13. "Burnie" 5:04 (Garrett, Moginie) - Bonus Track, Acoustic Recording - Albert Studios, Sydney, 1992

== Charts ==
Chart (1992)	Position
Australian Albums (ARIA)	3
Austrian Albums (Ö3 Austria)	30
Canada Top Albums/CDs (RPM)	60
German Albums (Offizielle Top 100)	37
Dutch Albums (Album Top 100)	73
New Zealand Albums (RMNZ)	28
Swedish Albums (Sverigetopplistan)	42
US Billboard 200	141
US Top Album Sales (Billboard)	141

== Certifications ==
Region	Certification	Certified units/sales
Australia (ARIA)	Platinum	70,000^{^}
^{^} Shipments figures based on certification alone.

== Personnel ==
- Peter Garrett - lead vocals
- Peter Gifford - bass, vocals (tracks 1, 4, 5, and 12)
- Bones Hillman - bass, vocals (tracks 2, 3, 6–11, and 13)
- Rob Hirst - drums, vocals
- Jim Moginie - guitars, keyboards, vocals
- Martin Rotsey - guitars, vocals
