= A Version of Now =

Studio album by Peter Garrett
- Released: 15 July 2016
- Genre: Rock
- Length: 34:47
- Label: Sony

Peter Garrett chronology
A Version of Now (2016)	The True North (2024)

Singles from A Version of Now
- 1. "Tall Trees" Released: 16 May 2016; 2. "Great White Shark" Released: 30 May 2016; 3. "It Still Matters to Me" Released: 8 July 2016

A Version of Now is the first solo studio album by Australian rock musician Peter Garrett, which was released in July 2016 on Sony Music Entertainment Australia. The album follows Garrett's retirement from Australian politics at the 2013 federal election.

== Critical reception ==
Professional ratings
Review scores
Source	Rating
The Music	4/5 stars
Sydney Morning Herald	3/5 stars

Steve Bell from The Music said "The album's lyrics are clearly imperative but the music also plays an important role, a considered rock backing less powerful than his alma mater but serving these songs well. Throughout Garrett proves as passionate and thought-provoking as ever, showing that you can address the necessity for change and contemplation while remaining completely comfortable in your own skin."

Bernard Zuel from Sydney Morning Herald said "[it's] energised and powerful, surprisingly tender and likely more complex than many expected. If it's short of brilliance then it is also fair to say it's never merely adequate."

Michael Smith from Renowned for Sound said "Stylistically, A Version of Now is extremely straightforward and simple. The focus is always placed on Garrett's easily identifiable, heavily accented singing, filling in the gap behind his voice with the music so they work in harmony rather than fighting for dominance" adding "There's nothing truly groundbreaking to be found on Garrett's solo debut, but its familiarity is ultimately what fans will enjoy most out of it."

== Track listing ==
A Version of Now track listing
No.	Title	Length
1.	"Tall Trees"	3:47
2.	"I'd Do It Again"	3:07
3.	"No Placebo"	3:55
4.	"Homecoming"	3:26
5.	"Kangaroo Tail"	3:22
6.	"Great White Shark"	3:46
7.	"Only One"	4:16
8.	"Night & Day"	4:06
9.	"It Still Matters"	5:02
Total length:		34:47

== Charts ==
Chat performance for A Version of Now
Chart (2016)	Peak position
Australian Albums (ARIA)	3
French Albums (SNEP)	142
New Zealand Albums (RMNZ)	35
