= Southeast Desert Metal =

Australian metal band from Santa Teresa

- Origin: Ltyentye Apurte (Santa Teresa), Australia
- Genres: Heavy metal, hard rock
- Years active: (2013–present)
- Labels: The Black Wreath
- Members: Chris Wallace; Gavin Hayes; Robert Wallace; Gary Bird
- Past members: Cedric Ross; Derek Hayes

Southeast Desert Metal is an Australian Aboriginal heavy metal band who have released a number of albums. They have also had a documentary made about them.

They are described as the most isolated touring bands in the world.

== Background ==
South East Desert Metal was formed in 2013 and they have their own take on classic heavy metal. The group comes from the remote Aboriginal community of Ltyentye Apurte (Santa Teresa) and are a self-proclaimed 'family band'.

The band is led by Chris Wallace. In his family background, his uncles played country music. However AC/DC, Iron Maiden and Black Sabbath was his preference. They also list their inspiration as being inspired by Metallica and Judas Priest.

The original lineup included vocalist Cedric Ross. He left the group at some stage. The band also had Derek Hayes on bass but he was replaced by Garry Bird sometime around 2018. As of December 2018, the band was made up of Chris Wallace on lead vocals and guitar, Gavin Hayes on guitar, Robert Wallace (Chris' nephew) on drums, and Gary Bird on bass.

== Career ==
The group released their self-titled album in 2015.

In December 2018, their third album Break The Silence was released.

The group was the subject of the documentary, Desert Metal Dreaming which was released in 2021. It was referred to as the "unexpected spiritual cross section of heavy metal and the cultural history of Indigenous Australia".

It was reported by Scenezine on 8 July 2021 that the group had completed their album at Black Wreath studio in Alice Springs. It was due for release that year.

It was reported by NME on 6 July 2022 that Southeast Desert Metal had released their version of the Midnight Oil song "Beds Are Burning" that day. The chorus of the song was sung in Arrernte language.

Supported by acts Run and Primitive, SouthEast Desert Metal appeared at the Bendigo Hotel in Collingwood on 5 October 2023. They performed their classic "Desert Metal". They received a positive review by Metal Roos.

== Discography ==
- Southeast Desert Metal (2015)
- Break the Silence (2018)

== Members ==
=== Current line-up ===
- Chris Wallace — lead vocals, guitar (2013-present)
- Gavin Hayes — guitar (2013-present)
- Gary Bird — bass (2018-present)
- Robert Wallace — drums (2013-present)

=== Former members ===
- Cedric Ross — vocals (2013-?)
- Derek Hayes — bass (2013-2018)
