= Truganini (song) =

1993 single by Midnight Oil

Single by Midnight Oil

from the album Earth and Sun and Moon
- Released: 15 March 1993
- Length: 4:20
- Label: Columbia; Sprint
- Songwriters: Rob Hirst; Jim Moginie
- Producers: Nick Launay; Midnight Oil

Midnight Oil singles chronology
"Beds Are Burning" (1992)	"Truganini" (1993)	"My Country" (1993)

Music video
- "Truganini" on YouTube

"Truganini" is a song by Australian rock band Midnight Oil from their eighth studio album, Earth and Sun and Moon (1993). It was inspired by Truganini, a Nuenonne woman from south-east Tasmania. The song uses a recurring Australian issue—drought—to pose the question "what for?", meaning "why did Europeans bother to colonise this harsh place?" The song mentions two prominent indigenous Australians (Truganini and Albert Namatjira) whose lives were altered by European settlement and discusses current day sentiment towards the old country, namely the monarchy.

"Truganini" was a chart success in several countries when released in March 1993 by Columbia and Sprint, peaking at number four in New Zealand, number 10 in Australia, number 11 in Canada and number 29 in the United Kingdom. In the United States, it peaked at number four on the Billboard Modern Rock Tracks chart and number 10 on the Billboard Album Rock Tracks chart. The single's liner notes included the claim that Truganini was the "sole surviving Tasmanian Aborigine" when she died. This sparked protest by some of the 7,000 people who identify as Tasmanian Aboriginal. Lead singer Peter Garrett issued an apology.

== Live performances ==
The band performed the song live for American audiences as the musical guest on the American television show Saturday Night Live on 8 May 1993, when Christina Applegate served as host.

== Track listings ==
Australian CD and cassette single, UK cassette single
No.	Title	Writer(s)	Length
1.	"Truganini"	Rob Hirst, Jim Moginie	4:20
2.	"Bushfire"	Moginie, Peter Garrett	4:40

Australian CD single (12-inch mixes)
No.	Title	Writer(s)	Length
1.	"Truganini" (Long Roadtrain mix)	Hirst, Moginie	7:13
2.	"Truganini" (Short Roadtrain mix)	Hirst, Moginie	5:15
3.	"Truganini" (7-inch version)	Hirst, Moginie	4:55
4.	"Bushfire"	Moginie, Garrett	4:36

UK CD1
No.	Title	Writer(s)	Length
1.	"Truganini"	Hirst, Moginie	4:25
2.	"Bushfire"	Moginie, Garrett	4:42
3.	"Dreamworld" (live)	Moginie, Garrett, Hirst	3:42
4.	"Hercules" (live)	Moginie, Garrett, Hirst	4:47

UK CD2
No.	Title	Writer(s)	Length
1.	"Truganini"	Hirst, Moginie	4:25
2.	"Beds Are Burning" (live)	Hirst, Moginie, Garrett	4:05
3.	"Read About It" (live)	Hirst, Moginie, Garrett	3:53
4.	"Stars of Warburton" (live)	Moginie, Garrett	5:00

UK 12-inch single
No.	Title	Writer(s)	Length
1.	"Truganini"	Hirst, Moginie	4:55
2.	"Bushfire"	Moginie, Garrett	4:42
3.	"Beds Are Burning" (live)	Hirst, Moginie, Garrett	4:05
4.	"Only the Strong" (live)	Hirst, Moginie	5:42

US 7-inch single
No.	Title	Writer(s)	Length
1.	"Truganini"	Hirst, Moginie	4:56
2.	"Drums of Heaven"	Hirst, Moginie, Garrett	5:35

== Charts ==
=== Weekly charts ===
Chart (1993)	Peak position
Australia (ARIA)	10
Canada Top Singles (RPM)	11
Europe (Eurochart Hot 100)	92
Europe (European Hit Radio)	28
New Zealand (Recorded Music NZ)	4
UK Singles (Official Charts)	29
US Alternative Airplay (Billboard)	4
US Mainstream Rock (Billboard)	10

=== Year-end charts ===
Chart (1993)	Position
Canada Top Singles (RPM)	92
New Zealand (RIANZ)	42
US Modern Rock Tracks (Billboard)	21

== Release history ==
Region	Date	Format(s)	Label(s)	Ref.
Australia	15 March 1993	CD	Columbia; Sprint	
United Kingdom	29 March 1993	12-inch vinyl; CD	Columbia; Sprint	
United States	5 April 1993	—N/a	Columbia; Sprint	
Japan	21 April 1993	Mini-CD	Epic	
