= There Will Be No Intermission =

Studio album by Amanda Palmer
- Released: March 8, 2019
- Studio: 64 Sound in Los Angeles, California
- Length: 78:00
- Labels: Amanda Palmer; Cooking Vinyl
- Producer: John Congleton

Amanda Palmer chronology
I Can Spin a Rainbow (2017)	There Will Be No Intermission (2019)	Amanda Palmer & Friends Present Forty-Five Degrees: Bushfire Flash Record (2020)

Singles from There Will Be No Intermission
- 1. "Drowning in the Sound" Released: December 11, 2018; 2. "Voicemail For Jill" Released: February 19, 2019

There Will Be No Intermission is the third solo studio album by American musician Amanda Palmer. It was released on March 8, 2019, through Cooking Vinyl. It was crowdfunded through Patreon and recorded by Palmer in collaboration with John Congleton over the course of a month. It was supported by a 2019–2020 tour. The vinyl version of the album was released on March 29, 2019.

== Background ==
Palmer stated that "Most of these songs were exercises in survival. This isn't really the record that I was planning to make. But loss and death kept happening in real-time, and these songs became my therapeutic arsenal of tools for making sense of it all." She also said that "The kind of stories that I'm sharing on this record—abortion, miscarriage, cancer, grief, the darker sides of parenthood—have been therapeutic and frightening to write."

The cover art is allusive to Virgin Steele's 1985 album Noble Savage.

== Promotion ==
The demos of "Bigger on the Inside" (originally featuring Zoë Keating), "The Thing About Things", "A Mother's Confession", "Machete", "Drowning in the Sound", and "Judy Blume" were all released as promotional singles on March 9, 2015, May 26, 2015, February 25, 2016, March 9, 2016, August 31, 2017, and February 12, 2018, respectively. "Judy Blume" and "Look Mummy, No Hands" were previously included on the 2013 live album An Evening with Neil Gaiman & Amanda Palmer. "Judy Blume" also received a music video on February 12, 2019.

"The Ride" (originally released as a Patron-exclusive video on October 26, 2017) was previewed with a performance on NPR's All Things Considered on February 13, 2019.

=== Singles ===
The studio version of "Drowning in the Sound" was released as the first official single from the album along with the album pre-order on December 11, 2018. A music video was released on August 8, 2019.

"Voicemail for Jill" was released as the second single on February 19, 2019. A music video for the song was released on March 7, 2019.

== Reception ==
Professional ratings
Aggregate scores
Source	Rating
AnyDecentMusic?	7.2/10
Metacritic	78/100
Review scores
Source	Rating
AllMusic	3/5 stars
The Irish Times	8/10
The Line of Best Fit	9/10
NME	4/5 stars
PopMatters	9/10 stars

The album has received a score of 78/100 from media aggregate site Metacritic based on 11 reviews, indicating "generally favorable reviews".

== Track listing ==
All tracks written by Amanda Palmer, except where noted

No.	Title	Writer(s)	Length
1.	"All the Things"		1:23
2.	"The Ride"		10:13
3.	"Congratulations"		0:37
4.	"Drowning in the Sound"	Amanda Palmer; Ben Folds	5:45
5.	"Hold on Tight, Darling"		0:40
6.	"The Thing About Things"		5:35
7.	"Life's Such a Bitch Isn't It"		0:33
8.	"Judy Blume"		6:45
9.	"Feeding the Dark"		0:20
10.	"Bigger on the Inside"		8:29
11.	"There Will Be No Intermission"		1:01
12.	"Machete"		6:09
13.	"You Know the Statistics"		0:38
14.	"Voicemail for Jill"		5:34
15.	"You'd Think I'd Shot Their Children"		1:43
16.	"A Mother's Confession"		10:37
17.	"They're Saying Not to Panic"		0:27
18.	"Look Mummy, No Hands"	Dillie Keane	5:30
19.	"Intermission Is Relative"		0:54
20.	"Death Thing"		5:00
Total length:			78:00

== Personnel ==
Taken from the album's liner notes.

=== Musicians ===
- Amanda Palmer – vocals, piano, ukulele, organ, synths
- Crystal Brooke Alforque – violin (Track 12)
- Laurann Angel – violin, viola
- Jherek Bischoff – double bass, guitar, vibraphone, prepared piano, sub bass synth, cymbals, bass drum, backing vocals
- John Congleton – drums, synths, sequencing
- Madeline Falcone – violin, viola
- Nicole Garcia – violin, viola
- April Guthrie – cello
- Max Henry – synths
- Paris Hurley – violin, viola
- Rachel Iba – violin, viola
- Jodie Landau – vibraphone, glockenspiel
- Aniela Marie Perry – cello
- Joey Waronker – drums
- Jason Webley – accordion
- The "Baby Didn't Die" Choir: Anthony Palacios, Carly D. Weckstein, Charlotte Kaufman, David Goren, Ian Michaels, Jherek Bischoff, Joy Craig, Kale Chase, Lisa Schneider, Marvel Star de la Cruz, Michelle Gibson, Paul Bellatoni, Phoebe Pinder, Sara Bartel, Simon Vance, Theresa Richardson, Vanessa Rodriguez, Xine Trevino

=== Technical ===
- Amanda Palmer – writer (Tracks 1–17, 19–20)
- Jherek Bischoff – instrumental arrangement and mixing (all instrumental interludes), string arrangement (Track 12), recording (vibraphone, double bass, sub bass synth, cymbals, bass drum, and glockenspiel)
- Greg Calbi – mastering
- John Congleton – producer, mixing, engineer
- Ben Folds – "songwriting help" (Track 4)
- Tyler Karmen – studio assistant
- Dillie Keane – writer (Track 18)
- Jaron Luksa – recording (Track 12), violin, violin, and cello recording

=== Artwork ===
- Allan Amato – sleeve photography
- Regina Harris – stylist for insert photography
- Kahn & Selesnick – insert photography
- Andrew Nelson – album artwork designer
- "Piano Stewards": Ngo'e Crossan, Julias Ross Bright, Philip Marshall, Nico Deslis, Joe Yarabek, Ben Ranes
- "Library Department": Justine Marzack, Ash Gaiman

== Tour ==
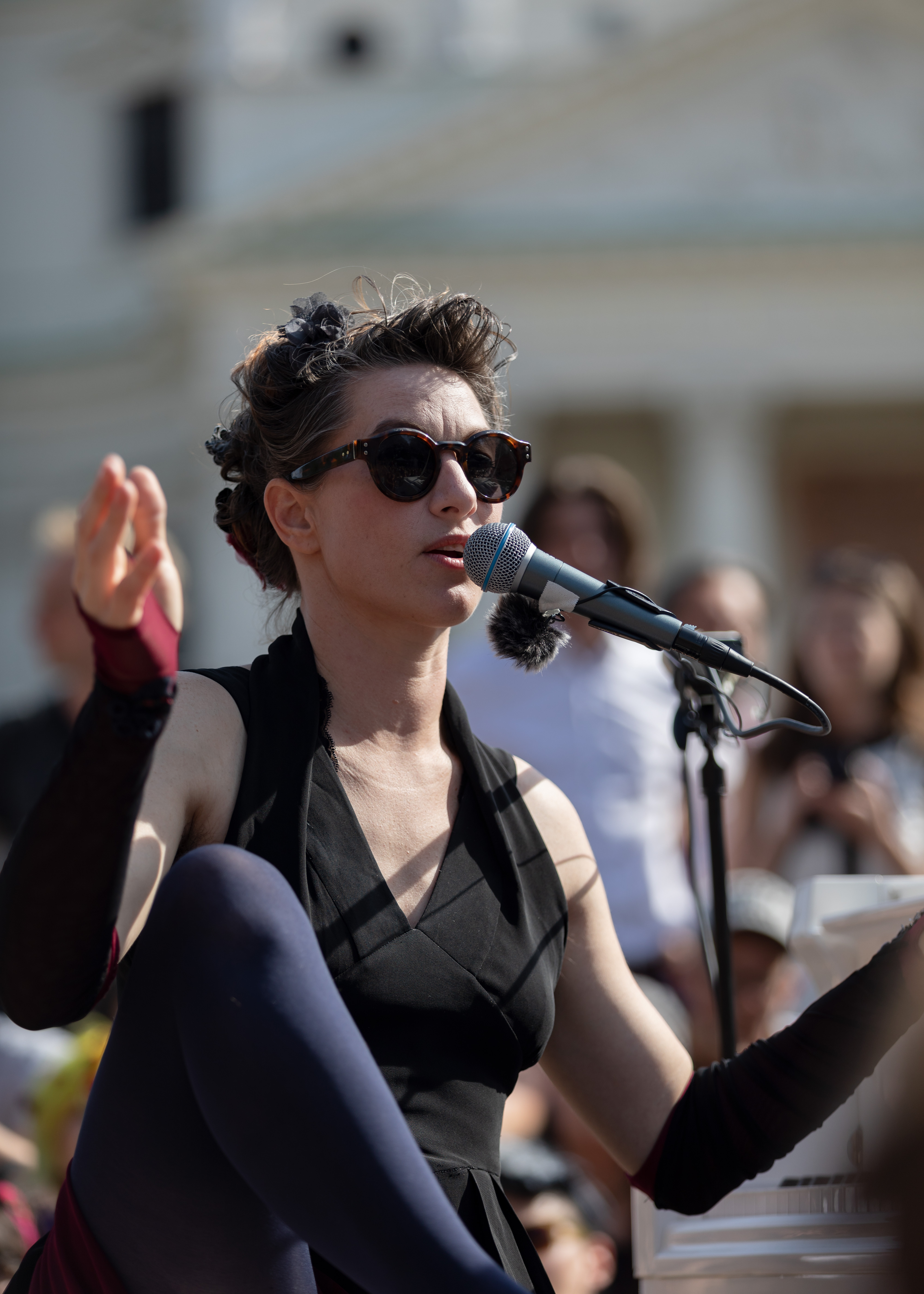
Palmer performing a free charity concert in Vienna during the tour in September 2019

Throughout 2019 and 2020, Palmer embarked on the There Will Be No Intermission World Tour. The over four-hour long show featured a mix of both songs and storytelling themed around Palmer's personal life. The Los Angeles performance, as well as the December 13 and 14th London shows, were recorded exclusively for her Patrons on Patreon. On March 14, 2019, Palmer performed a three-hour excerpt of There Will Be No Intermission at Central Presbyterian Church, as part of the SXSW Music Festival.

== Charts ==
Chart (2019)	Peak position
Australian Digital Albums (ARIA)	40
Austrian Albums (Ö3 Austria)	30
Scottish Albums (Official Charts)	49
US Billboard 200	169
US Americana/Folk Albums (Billboard)	6
US Independent Albums (Billboard)	3
US Top Alternative Albums (Billboard)	14
US Top Rock Albums (Billboard)	33

== See also ==
- Music videos for this album
