= The True North (album) =

Studio album by Peter Garrett
- Released: 15 March 2024
- Length: 36:48
- Label: Peter Garrett; Sony
- Producer: Peter Garrett; Tony Buchen

Peter Garrett chronology
A Version of Now (2016)	The True North (2024)

Singles from The True North
- 1. "Innocence Parts 1 & 2" Released: 20 October 2023; 2. "Permaglow" Released: 2 February 2024

The True North is the second studio album by Australian rock musician Peter Garrett, released on 15 March 2024. The album was announced on 20 October 2023.

The album was recorded with producer Tony Buchen and The Alter Egos, a band including Martin Rotsey, Heather Shannon, Evan Mannell and Rowan Lane.

Upon announcement, Garrett said, "With the Oils, and even the first solo record, there was plenty of banging down the doors and speaking out about the things that need to change. There's still a bit of that in this album too of course but generally these songs are reflective of the special things we need to cherish; the natural world as well as our always spinning internal compass, that helps us navigate the unruly passage of life."

== Release and promotion ==
On 13 October 2023, shared the title track, with Garrett saying via his website that the first "official" single from the album will be released on 20 October.

On 20 October 2023, "Innocence Parts 1 & 2" was released. Its video was released on 17 November 2023.

"Permaglow" was released as the album's second single on 2 February 2024.

The album will be supported with the Peter Garrett & The Alter Egos – The True North Tour 2024, in March 2024 across Australia.

== Critical reception ==
Professional ratings
Review scores
Source	Rating
Rolling Stone Australia	3/5 stars

Jeff Jenkins from JB Hi-Fi said "Overall, The True North is a deeply unsettling listening experience. It's an album torn between hope and despair" calling the album "a joy".

Lars Brandle from Rolling Stone Australia said "The former Midnight Oil frontman's second solo album reveals a rocker who still wants in on the game after an already storied career."

Noel Mengel from The Music said "The album draws inspiration from the natural world and Australia's northern regions. Some songs directly address serious issues; others have broader brush strokes. But the call to action in Garrett's music is undimmed."

== Track listing ==
All tracks are written by Peter Garrett, except "Paddo", written by Garrett and Martin Rotsey; and "Human Playground", written by Ainslie Wills.

The True North track listing
No.	Title	Length
1.	"The True North"	3:30
2.	"Paddo" (Garrett, Martin Rotsey)	3:57
3.	"Innocent Parts 1 & 2"	7:14
4.	"Hey Archetype"	3:13
5.	"Permaglow"	3:28
6.	"Human Playground"	3:37
7.	"Currowan"	3:19
8.	"Meltdown"	3:54
9.	"Everybody"	4:36
Total length:		36:48

== Personnel ==
Musicians

- Peter Garrett – vocals, harp
- Grace Garrett – background vocals
- May Garrett – background vocals
- Rowan Lane – bass
- Freya Schack-Arnott – cello
- Evan Mannell – drums
- Martin Rotsey – guitar
- Heather Shannon – keyboards, piano, synthesiser
- Ollie Thorpe – pedal steel guitar
- Tony Buchen – synthesizer

Technical

- Peter Garrett – production, mixing
- Tony Buchen – production, mixing, engineering
- Steve Smart – mastering
- Martin Rotsey – engineering assistance
- Caleb Hill – engineering assistance

== Charts ==
Chart performance for The True North
Chart (2024)	Peak position
Australian Albums (ARIA)	17
