= Vermillion Lies =

American cabaret band

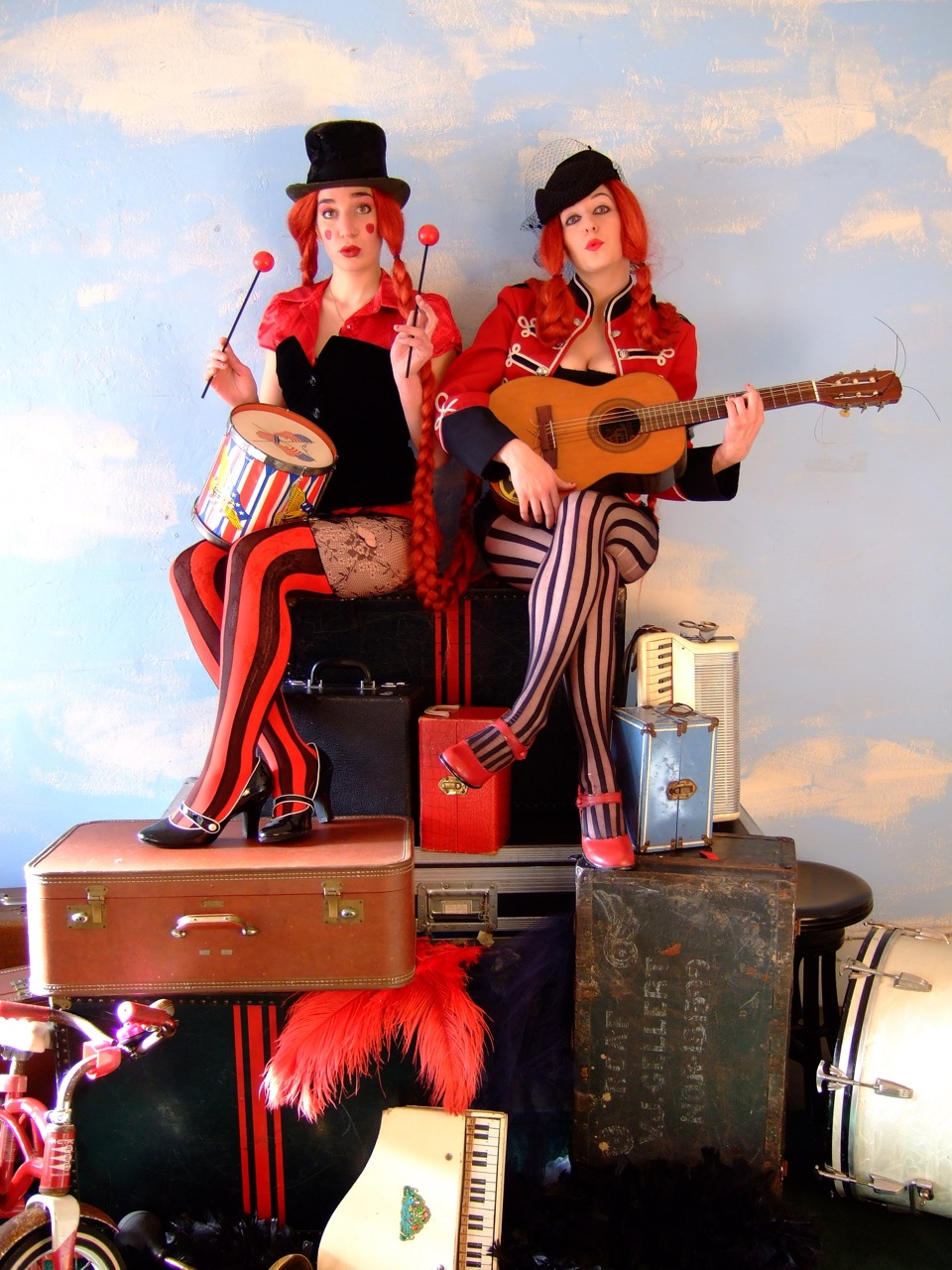

Background information
- Origin: Oakland, California, USA
- Genres: Indie folk, folk pop, dark cabaret
- Years active: 2006–present (hiatus)
- Label: Unsigned
- Members: Max Fractal; Zeo Boekbinder
- Website: www.vermillionlies.com

Vermillion Lies were a cabaret band from Oakland, California. The band consisted of siblings Max Fractal and Zeo Boekbinder. They are known for incorporating elements of circus and folk into their music. The band stated on their website on August 7, 2009: "Our exciting news today is that Vermillion Lies is giving way to two solo careers! We will still be playing some shows together as Vermillion Lies, but most of our energies and attentions will be going to our solo music at this time."

== Discography ==
=== Studio albums ===
- Separated by Birth (2006), Label: A Small Tribe Records, ASIN: B000HD1MZW
- What's in the Box? (2008), MP3, self-released, ASIN: B001BL2JFQ

=== EPs ===
- Scream-Along EP (2007)
- In New Orleans 7" vinyl (2008)
