= You Got Me Singing =

Studio album by Amanda Palmer and Jack Palmer
- Released: July 15, 2016
- Recorded: August 2015
- Studio: Dreamland Studio, Hurley, NY
- Genre: Folk
- Length: 47:48
- Label: 8 ft.; Cooking Vinyl

Amanda Palmer chronology
Theatre Is Evil (2012)	You Got Me Singing (2016)	I Can Spin a Rainbow (2017)

Singles from You Got Me Singing
- 1. "All I Could Do" Released: September 15, 2015; 2. "1952 Vincent Black Lightning" Released: May 3, 2016

You Got Me Singing is a collaborative studio album by American singer-songwriter Amanda Palmer, recorded with her father Jack Palmer. It was released on July 15, 2016, through Amanda Palmer's label 8 ft. Records and Cooking Vinyl. It peaked at 16 on the American Americana/Folk Albums chart.

In August 2015, Palmer and her father went to a cabin in Upstate New York when she was eight months pregnant. Anxious about her impending motherhood and looking to connect with her own father who was absent for most of her early childhood, they decided to record an album of covers together. The album's cover pays homage to Bob Dylan's Bringing It All Back Home.

== Promotion ==
A cover of "So Much Wine" by The Handsome Family was released as a promotional single on December 15, 2015, exclusively on Bandcamp. However, the song did not make it on the album.

A cover of "All I Could Do" by Kimya Dawson was released as the album's first single on September 15, 2015.

A cover of "1952 Vincent Black Lightning" by Richard Thompson was released as the second single on May 3, 2016, alongside an official music video animated by David Mack.

A music video was released for "Wynken, Blynken, and Nod" on October 19, 2016. The video was directed by Jim Batt and Kim Boekbinder and features cameos from many of the Palmers' friends including Jason Webley and multiple cast members from the podcast Welcome to Night Vale. An animated music video drawn by Chiara Ambrosio was released on October 31, 2016.

== Reception ==
Professional ratings
Aggregate scores
Source	Rating
AnyDecentMusic?	7.2/10
Metacritic	72/100
Review scores
Source	Rating
Allmusic	3.5/5 stars
Drowned in Sound	8/10
The Line of Best Fit	7.5/10
The Guardian	4/5 stars

On Metacritic the albums holds a score of 72 based on reviews from 7 critics, indicating "generally favorable reviews". Rob Wacey for Allmusic called the album " Beautifully delivered, both father and daughter complement each other's vocals extremely well" and that "for an album of cover songs, the result still feels entirely personal and held dear when hearing the father and daughter pay tribute to their inspirations together." Dan Fielding for The Line of Best Fit said "Standing alone, this a warming set of tastefully executed covers. But see the album in its context and you'll find its beauty – a record of music repairing a once strained relationship."

== Track listing ==
No.	Title	Original artist	Length
1.	"You Got Me Singing"	Leonard Cohen	2:21
2.	"Wynken, Blynken and Nod"	Lucy and Carly Simon	3:08
3.	"Again"	Melanie Safka	3:21
4.	"1952 Vincent Black Lightning"	Richard Thompson	4:34
5.	"Louise Was Not Half Bad"	Tom T Hall	3:16
6.	"Black Boys on Mopeds"	Sinéad O'Connor	3:55
7.	"All I Could Do"	Kimya Dawson	3:36
8.	"In the Heat of the Summer"	Phil Ochs	3:01
9.	"Pink Emerson Radio"	Kathleen Edwards	4:58
10.	"Skye Boat Song"	Traditional	3:52
11.	"Glacier"	John William Grant and Thorarinsson Birgir	7:21
12.	"I Love You So Much"	Noah Britton	4:25

== Personnel ==
Credits taken from the album liner notes

- Amanda Palmer – vocals, piano, ukulele, glockenspiel, mellotron, vibraphone, production
- Jack Palmer – vocals, guitar
- Joe Costa – tambourine, thundersheet, engineering
- Kyle Cassidy – photography
- Emily Weiland – design implementation
- Joe Costa – recording and mixing
- Rob Stein – pedal steel
- Fluid Mastering – mastering
