= Beds Are Burning =

1987 single by Midnight Oil

- Australian seven-inch vinyl single

Single by Midnight Oil

from the album Diesel and Dust
- B-side: "Gunbarrel Highway"; "Bullroarer" (US only)
- Released: 10 August 1987
- Studio: Albert (Sydney, Australia)
- Genre: Alternative rock; pub rock; R&B
- Length: 4:18
- Label: Columbia
- Songwriters: Rob Hirst; Jim Moginie; Peter Garrett
- Producers: Warne Livesey; Midnight Oil

Midnight Oil singles chronology
"The Dead Heart" (1986)	"Beds Are Burning" (1987)	"Put Down That Weapon" (1987)

Alternative cover
- Side A of the US single

Audio sample
- file; help

Music video
- "Beds Are Burning" on YouTube

"Beds Are Burning" is a song by the Australian rock band Midnight Oil, the first track from their sixth album, Diesel and Dust (1987). This song was released as the second single from the album. It reached No. 1 in New Zealand, South Africa and Canada, No. 6 in Australia, and No. 17 in the United States. It is one of The Rock and Roll Hall of Fame's 500 Songs that Shaped Rock and Roll and it was named number 95 on VH1's 100 Greatest One Hit Wonders of the 80s and number 97 by the Triple J Hottest 100 of All Time in 2009.

The band performed the song live during the 2000 Summer Olympics closing ceremony without the permission of the IOC due to the political message the song sends.

In May 2001, Australasian Performing Right Association (APRA) celebrated its 75th anniversary by naming the Best Australian Songs of all time, as decided by a 100 strong industry panel. "Beds Are Burning" was declared third behind the Easybeats' "Friday on My Mind" and Daddy Cool's "Eagle Rock".

In January 2018, as part of Triple M's "Ozzest 100", the 'most Australian' songs of all time, "Beds Are Burning" was ranked number 9. In 2025, the song placed 18 in the Triple J Hottest 100 of Australian Songs.

== Composition ==
After Midnight Oil toured through the Outback in 1986, playing to remote Aboriginal communities and seeing firsthand the seriousness of the issues in health and living standards, Peter Garrett, Jim Moginie and Rob Hirst wrote "Beds Are Burning" to criticise how said populations were often removed from their lands, highlighted by the pre-chorus lines "it belongs to them, let's give it back". Considering such a local affair inspired a worldwide hit, Garrett commented "Who would have thought an Aboriginal land rights song would travel that far?" There are specific references to certain Australian places and politics, such as Kintore Ranges and the town of Yuendumu, vehicles produced by the Holden company, the "It's Time" slogan and the notion of "the fair go".

In an interview with British website and publication Songwriting Magazine, Rob Hirst discussed how Midnight Oil were determined to be seen as an Australian band. In the same conversation he stated, "Land rights are something that appear in so many countries around the world, New Zealand, Canada, the United States, but we were determined that Midnight Oil wouldn't be seen as one of those international bands, writing songs that could have come from anywhere. We were determined to put place names and other specific bits and pieces in all our songs."

== Track listings ==
All tracks are written by Rob Hirst, Jim Moginie, and Peter Garrett, except where noted.

Australian 7-inch single
No.	Title	Writer(s)	Length
1.	"Beds Are Burning"		3:52
2.	"Gunbarrel Highway"	Midnight Oil	3:37

Australian 12-inch and maxi-CD single
No.	Title	Writer(s)	Length
1.	"Beds Are Burning"		3:52
2.	"Gunbarrel Highway"	Midnight Oil	3:37
3.	"Sometimes"		3:45

UK 12-inch single
No.	Title	Length
1.	"Beds Are Burning" (Single Version)	4:15
2.	"Beds Are Burning" (Yuendumu Percapella Mix)	4:27
3.	"The Dead Heart" (Long Version)	6:07

== Charts ==
=== Weekly charts ===
Chart (1987–1989)	Peak position
Australia (Kent Music Report)	6
Belgium (Ultratop 50 Flanders)	2
Canada Retail Singles (The Record)	1
Canada Top Singles (RPM)	1
Canada Dance/Urban (RPM)	20
Europe (Eurochart Hot 100 Singles)	20
France (SNEP)	5
Ireland (IRMA)	11
Netherlands (Dutch Top 40)	3
Netherlands (Single Top 100)	3
New Zealand (Recorded Music NZ)	1
South Africa (Springbok Radio)	1
Sweden (Sverigetopplistan)	17
UK Singles (Official Charts)	6
US Billboard Hot 100	17
US 12-inch Singles Sales (Billboard)	45
US Album Rock Tracks (Billboard)	6
US Dance Club Play (Billboard)	20
US Cash Box Top 100	26

Chart (2020)	Peak position
Poland Airplay (ZPAV)	58

=== Year-end charts ===
Chart (1987)	Rank
Australia (Australian Music Report)	21

Chart (1988)	Rank
Belgium (Ultratop 50 Flanders)	47
Canada Top Singles (RPM)	6
Europe (Eurochart Hot 100 Singles)	84
Netherlands (Dutch Top 40)	25
Netherlands (Single Top 100)	30
New Zealand (RIANZ)	11
South Africa (Springbok Radio)	10

Chart (1989)	Rank
UK Singles (OCC)	99

== Certifications and sales ==
Region	Certification	Certified units/sales
Australia (ARIA)	Platinum	70,000^{^}
Canada (Music Canada)	Gold	50,000^{^}
Germany (BVMI)	Gold	300,000^{‡}
France (SNEP)	Silver	250,000^{*}
New Zealand (RMNZ)	2× Platinum	60,000^{‡}
United Kingdom (BPI)	Silver	200,000^{‡}
^{*} Sales figures based on certification alone.^{^} Shipments figures based on certification alone.^{‡} Sales+streaming figures based on certification alone.

== Live version ==
"Beds Are Burning"
- Live Maxi-Single

Single by Midnight Oil

from the album Scream in Blue
- B-side: "No Reaction" (live); "Instant Karma!" (live)
- Released: 1992
- Recorded: Our Common Future Concert, Darlinghurst, 1989
- Genre: Rock; pub rock; R&B
- Length: 4:05
- Label: Columbia
- Songwriters: Rob Hirst; Jim Moginie; Peter Garrett

Midnight Oil singles chronology
"Sometimes" (1992)	"Beds Are Burning" (1992)	"Truganini" (1993)

A live recording from 1989 was released in 1992, as the second and final single from the band's compilation of live recordings album, Scream in Blue.

=== Track listing ===
CD Maxi
No.	Title	Writer(s)	Length
1.	"Beds Are Burning" (live)	Rob Hirst; Jim Moginie; Peter Garrett	4:05
2.	"No Reaction" (live)	Hirst; Moginie; Martin Rotsey	2:56
3.	"Instant Karma!" (live)	John Lennon	3:44

== Cover versions ==
- In 2001, a cover of "Beds Are Burning" was included on the eponymous Underground Moon album, a one-off modern rock project by former War & Peace bandmates, Jeff Pilson (Foreigner, Dokken), using the pseudonym Dominic Moon, and Tommy Henriksen (Alice Cooper, Warlock).
- On 2 October 2009, 60 musicians and celebrities from around the world released a free reworked version to highlight climate change issues before the United Nations' talks in Copenhagen. Singers included Lily Allen, Klaus Meine of the Scorpions, Simon Le Bon from Duran Duran, Tyson Ritter of The All-American Rejects and Bob Geldof. The former UN secretary-general Kofi Annan, Archbishop Desmond Tutu and the French actress Marion Cotillard also added their voices to the cover version. The song is part of Global Humanitarian Forum TckTckTck Time for Climate justice campaign and is a part of the greater "TckTckTck" project, which aims to draw attention to what they perceive as the urgency of global warming, by signing a "musical petition" with each download.
- Bill Wyman's Rhythm Kings released a cover version on their 2018 album Studio Time. Wyman himself performed co-lead vocals.
- On 1 May 2018, Canadian hardcore punk band Comeback Kid released a beefed up version of the song on a digital/7-inch release along with a new original song "Little Soldier".
- On 1 June 2018, Patti Smith performed a version live in Dublin, Ireland. Smith leads into the song with her own 3-minute spoken-word intro about the Aboriginal people of Australia, and the destruction of the Great Barrier Reef.
- On 18 February 2020, US musician Amanda Palmer released a version of the song, as the lead single from her album Forty-Five Degrees - A Bushfire Charity Flash Record. Palmer's version features Missy Higgins, Brian Viglione and Jherek Bischoff.
- On 18 February 2020, Australian Julia Stone released a version of the song. The song is the lead single from the 2020 various artists compilation album Songs for Australia.
- On 25 February 2022, American band Awolnation released a cover of the song in collaboration with Tim McIlrath of Rise Against. The song is the second release for the album of covers My Echo, My Shadow, My Covers, which was released on 6 May 2022.
- A bilingual Arrernte-English version was released by Northern Territory band Southeast Desert Metal in July 2022.

== See also ==
- List of number-one singles of 1988 (Canada)
- List of number-one singles from the 1980s (New Zealand)
- The bloodwood and the desert oak.
