= 8in8 =

Musical supergroup

- Works: Nighty Night
- Years active: 2011
- Spinoff of: The Dresden Dolls; Ben Folds Five; OK Go
- Past members: Amanda Palmer; Neil Gaiman; Ben Folds; Damian Kulash
- Website: www.eightineight.com

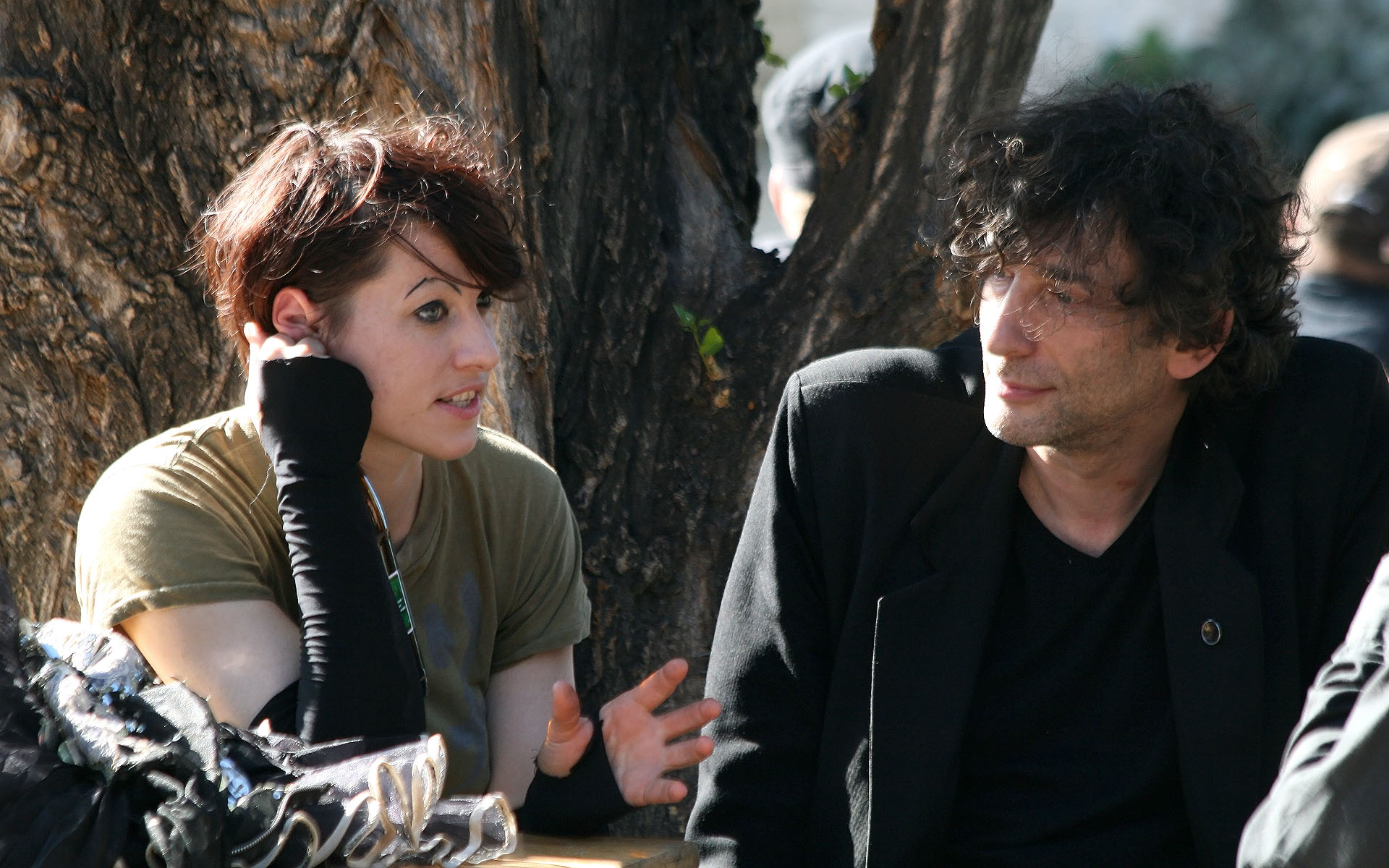
Amanda Palmer with then-husband Neil Gaiman in 2011.

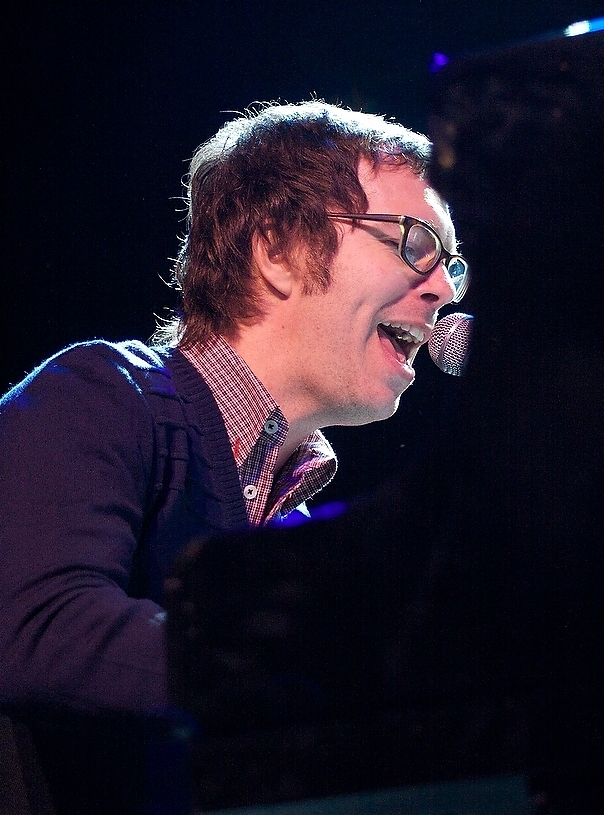
Folds in 2010
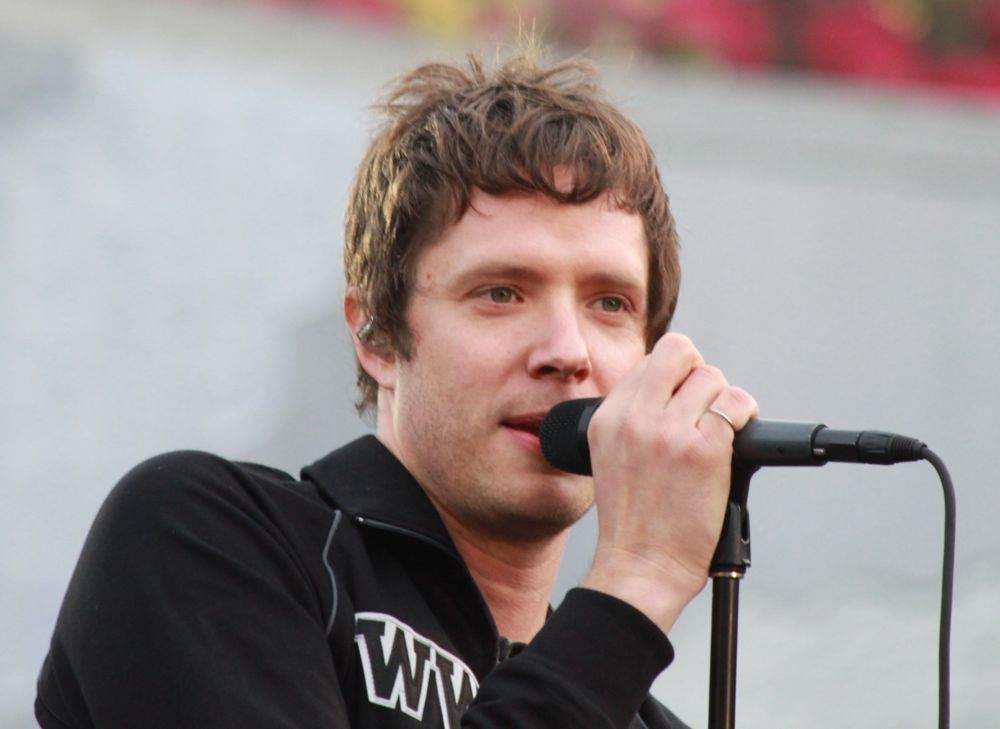
Kulash in 2010

8in8 was a supergroup composed of Amanda Palmer, Neil Gaiman, Ben Folds, and Damian Kulash of OK Go. In 2011 they gathered together with the intention of writing and recording eight songs in eight hours, hence the name "8in8". Aside from being friends, members of the group have various connections with each other: Neil Gaiman and Amanda Palmer were married, and Ben Folds appeared on and produced Palmer's solo debut Who Killed Amanda Palmer. The band have been referred to as a supergroup, acknowledging that moniker by describing themselves as "tomorrow's supergroup today". The musical members of 8in8 each have different styles and the EP Nighty Night was created to reflect each one, with main lyricist Gaiman adapting to suit.

The Berklee College of Music hosted the Rethink Music conference in April 2011, inviting musicians and representatives of the music industry to attend. During the discussions Amanda Palmer raised the question of how fast an artist could complete the process of creating an album, from writing new material to releasing the work. Shortly afterwards she joined with the other members of 8in8, forming the group to write and record an album as quickly as possible. On 25 April 2011 they went into Mad Oak Studios with producer Sean Slade. They had the intention of creating an album of eight songs in eight hours, but fell short of that target, completing six songs in 12 hours. The album, available under a Creative Commons license, went on sale on Bandcamp, raising over $21,000 for the Berklee City Music Network.

The session was broadcast live on Rethink-Music.com, and the band members used Twitter to communicate with fans, encouraging them to put forward ideas for the lyrics. Further involving the creative input of their fans, the Creative Commons license allowed people to create their own music videos for each track, with the best ones being reposted by members of the group.

The band have played one concert, returning to the Rethink Music conference just hours after completing the record. They played the set at the Berklee Performance Centre.
