= Max Fractal =

Canadian musician

- Born: Montreal, Quebec, Canada
- Genres: Alternative rock Indie; Dream pop Wonky pop Experimental; Shoegaze
- Occupation: Musician
- Instruments: Vocals, guitar, percussion, synth, keyboard/piano
- Years active: 2005–present
- Website: kimboekbinder.com

Max Fractal, born Kim Boekbinder, is a Canadian musician. Their music ranges from dark synth pop to acoustic looping.

A longtime proponent of direct-to-fan marketing and social media, Boekbinder gained publicity for their take on touring/show-booking via a Kickstarter campaign. In early 2012 Kim Boekbinder launched "Mission Control" a fundraising platform to finance the development of their second full-length album. Fans subscribe to a private website where songs and writings of the next album are shared. They previously performed in the band Vermillion Lies with their sibling Zeo.

== Career ==
Boekbinder's first full-length solo album The Impossible Girl was a departure from their earlier acoustic work with Vermillion Lies, the album was produced by Boston producer, Sean Slade, who discovered Max when Vermillion Lies opened for Amanda Palmer. The album was funded by a successful pre-order campaign which raised $20,000 in early 2010. The album was recorded at Mad Oak Studios in Allston, Massachusetts with engineer Benny Grotto.

In June 2011, Boekbinder pre-sold their first show in New York City. The idea of the pre-sold show received a good deal of attention after they wrote an impassioned post for English author, Warren Ellis. The idea was explained further during a radio interview with the BBC News on June 28, 2011.

Boekbinder's second studio album, The Sky is Calling, was co-produced by Grammy-nominated engineer Joel Hamilton at Studio G in Brooklyn, New York. The album is described by Boekbinder as an electro-galactic space epic and features data-bent sounds of NASA data and a collaboration with astronomer Phil Plait.

In 2014 Boekbinder began recording and releasing "Ephemeral Songs" on Bandcamp. They were called "ephemeral" because each song was only made available for a few weeks before being removed.

In 2016, Boekbinder wrote Pussy Grabs Back, a response to then-presidential candidate Donald Trump's comments during a controversial interview that many commentators and lawyers have described as sexual assault.

In the spring of 2017, Boekbinder announced the launch of their own record label, Golden Glow Records, based in New York City.

Boekbinder's third studio album, Noisewitch, was released on September 8, 2017, on Golden Glow Records.

In 2016, they collaborated with Jay Z, dream hampton, & Molly Crabapple to create a video titled "The War on Drugs is an Epic Fail", which premiered in the New York Times.

In 2017, Boekbinder collaborated with the ACLU, Laverne Cox, Molly Crabapple, and Zackary Drucker, in making a video about transgender history and resistance.

== Personal life ==
Boekbinder resides in New York City. In 2014, they announced that they had been granted US citizenship.

== Discography ==
=== Studio albums ===
- Split the Light (2021)
- NoiseWitch (2017)
- The Sky is Calling (2013)
- The Impossible Girl (2010)

=== Other recording projects ===
- "Rebel Cunt Army" (2017) – A single which did not appear on NoiseWitch
- "The Infinite Minute" (2015) – 169 one-minute songs. One song for every $100 raised on Kickstarter to fund a home recording studio.
- "Ephemeral Songs" (2014) – a series of singles released one at a time on Bandcamp.com. Each song was only up for a few weeks.
- "Moon Landing" (2012) – impromptu single with David J of Bauhaus
- "Music for Stray Days" (2011) – original song to accompany the popular web comic The Secret Knots
- "New York" (2011) – acoustic single, released in conjunction with original art by Molly Crabapple
- "Such Great Heights" (2011) – 7" vinyl record with Amanda Palmer featuring a cover of The Postal Service song and Boekbinder's original "On the Other Side of the World"
- "Thirty One" (2009) – 31 songs written and recorded in 31 days. One song released each day for a month.
- "First the Bees" (2008) – 5 song EP (as Kim Vermillion)

=== Guest appearances ===
- "The Rime of the Ancient Mariner" (2012) by The Tiger Lillies – Kim Boekbinder plays toy piano on several songs
- Say Hi To Your Neighborhood (2009) by Jim Avignon – Kim Boekbinder sings on "smalltalkworld"

=== With Vermillion Lies ===
- Separated by Birth (2006), Label: A Small Tribe Records, ASIN: B000HD1MZW
- Scream-Along EP (2007)
- What's in the Box? (2008), MP3, self-released, ASIN: B001BL2JFQ
- In New Orleans 7" vinyl (2008)
- "Sister Magic" (2015) 4 song digital EP
