= I Can Spin a Rainbow =

Studio album by Amanda Palmer and Edward Ka-Spel
- Released: May 5, 2017
- Recorded: Summer 2016
- Studio: Hideaway Studio and Chez Dots (London, England)
- Genre: Experimental
- Length: 63:53
- Label: 8 ft.; Cooking Vinyl

Amanda Palmer chronology
You Got Me Singing (2016)	I Can Spin a Rainbow (2017)	There Will Be No Intermission (2019)

Edward Ka-Spel albums chronology
Spectrescapes Volume 3 (2016)	I Can Spin a Rainbow (2017)	High on Station Yellow Moon (2017)

I Can Spin a Rainbow is a collaborative studio album by American singer-songwriter Amanda Palmer and English singer-songwriter Edward Ka-Spel of The Legendary Pink Dots. In a blog post on her official website, Palmer explained the backstory of how she was obsessed with the Pink Dots as a teenager, and even wrote and directed an experimental dialogue-free play inspired by their album Asylum when she was seventeen. When she was nineteen, the band needed a place to stay while on tour in Boston, Massachusetts and Palmer offered up her house. The Legendary Pink Dots also served as an opening act for Palmer's band the Dresden Dolls in the early 2000s. The two of them spent years trying to find a time to record an album together, but due to struggles in Palmer's personal life, plans always fell through. Most of the album was recorded in the house of English musician Imogen Heap.

On May 19, 2017, Ka-Spel released a four-track studio album called High on Station Yellow Moon that features Palmer on three of the tracks.

== Critical reception ==
Professional ratings
Aggregate scores
Source	Rating
Metacritic	60/100
Review scores
Source	Rating
AllMusic	2.5/5 stars
The A.V. Club	C−
The Boston Globe	7/10
Drowned in Sound	9/10
PopMatters	C−

The album received a score of 60/100 based on reviews from nine critics, indicating "mixed or average reviews", making it Palmer's lowest rated album on the site. AllMusic summarized the album with "At best, I Can Spin a Rainbow feels like the work of two talented artists savoring a long weekend of boundless creativity together, but from an outsider's perspective, the results are a bit too impenetrable to contextualize without having been in the room to witness its genesis." Marc Hirsh's review for the Boston Globe echoed the inaccessibility of the album, saying "Every album she's ever had a hand in is, in one way or another, about creating a community. I Can Spin a Rainbow may be the first that goes about it by shutting people out instead of bringing them in." The A.V. Club called the album "tuneless" and "just about as 'for the fans' as it gets." Andrew Dorsett of PopMatters deemed the album "insufferable" and that it "sounds like an inside joke, an indulgence on a whim that few others share or can access."

In contrast, Nina Keen of Drowned in Sound praised the album, saying "Each song tells its own story so intensely and so completely, like 11 musical horror novellas, that listening to any of them individually produces an experience more like that of listening to a shortish, intense, masterpiece-like album, especially as the songs often have a few different musical sections and ideas."

== Track listing ==
All songs written by Palmer and Ka-Spel

No.	Title	Length
1.	"Pulp Fiction"	6:04
2.	"Shahla's Missing Page"	5:08
3.	"The Shock of Kontakt"	7:14
4.	"Beyond the Beach"	2:50
5.	"The Clock at the Back of the Cage"	4:51
6.	"The Changing Room"	4:01
7.	"The Jack of Hands"	3:52
8.	"Prithee/Liquidation Day"	9:39
9.	"Rainbow's End"	7:10
Total length:		50:49

Bandcamp and vinyl versions
No.	Title	Length
10.	"Subway"	8:24
11.	"The Sun Still Shines"	4:40
Total length:		63:53

== Personnel ==
- Recorded at Hideaway Studio and Chez Dots, London in Summer 2016.
- Mastered by Ray Steeg and Peter Van Vliet
- Vocals and instruments: Amanda Palmer and Edward Ka-Spel
- Violins: Patrick Q. Wright
- Singing saw: Alexis Michallek
- Artwork: Judith Clute

== The Hands EP ==
Along with the album, Palmer released a two-track extended play called The Hands EP exclusively on 7-inch vinyl and limited to 1,111 copies exclusively available to her supporters on Patreon. The EP contains two songs that were not included on the album I Can Spin a Rainbow.

No.	Title	Length
1.	"The Jack of Hands"	3:53
2.	"Beautiful Plastik/The Mall"	5:44

== Live album ==
An over two hour long live album of the duo's concert in Vienna, Austria on June 16, 2017, alongside violinist Peter Q. Wright was released on SoundCloud on June 29, 2017.
