= Peter Garrett =

Australian musician and activist

The Honourable Peter Garrett AM
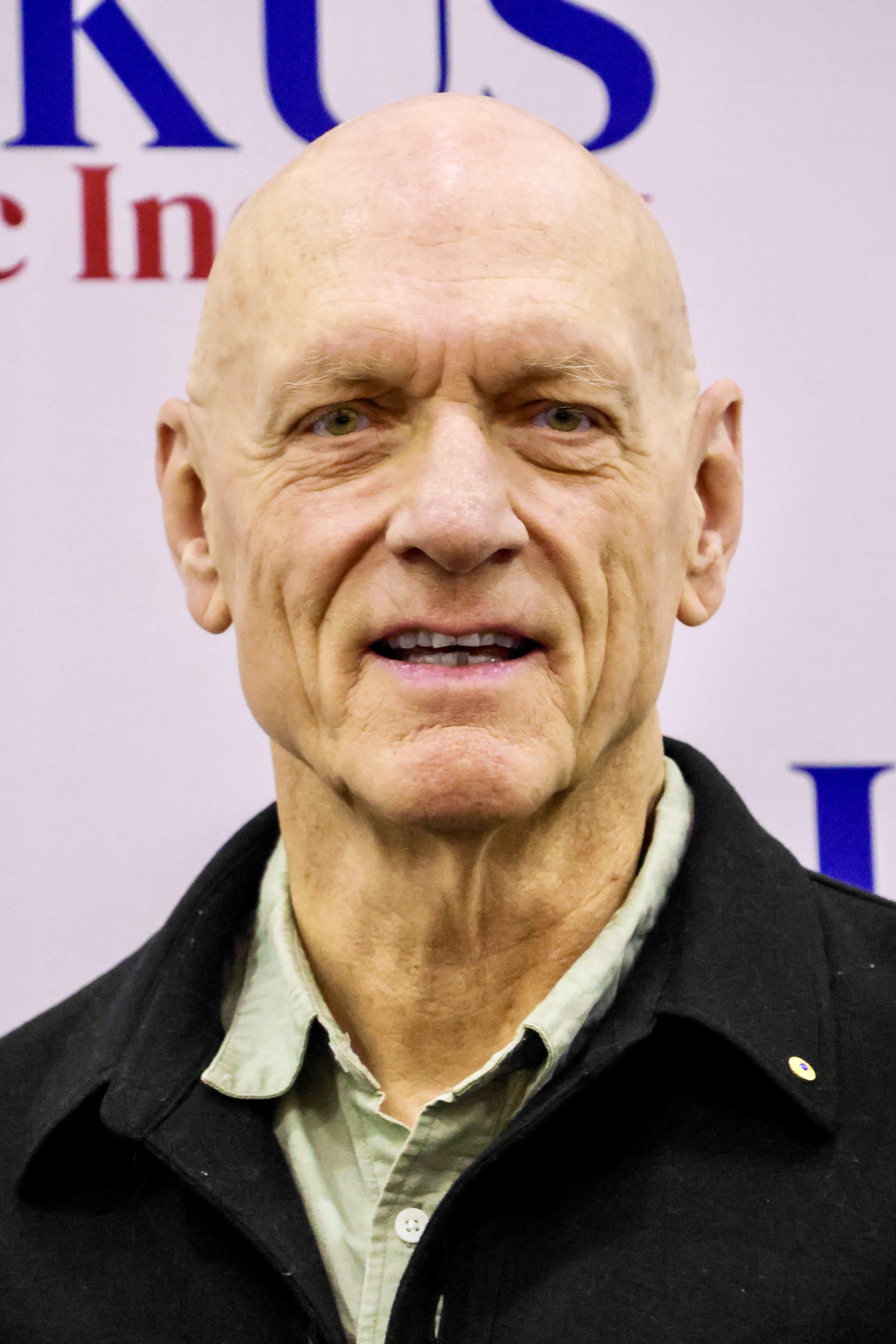
- Garrett in 2026

Minister for School Education, Early Childhood and Youth
- In office 14 September 2010 – 26 June 2013
- Prime Minister: Julia Gillard
- Preceded by: Simon Crean
- Succeeded by: Bill Shorten

Minister for the Environment, Heritage and the Arts
- In office 3 December 2007 – 14 September 2010
- Prime Minister: Kevin Rudd; Julia Gillard
- Preceded by: Malcolm Turnbull
- Succeeded by: Tony Burke

Member of the Australian Parliament for Kingsford Smith
- In office 9 October 2004 – 5 August 2013
- Preceded by: Laurie Brereton
- Succeeded by: Matt Thistlethwaite

Personal details
- Born: Peter Robert Garrett; 16 March 1954 (age 72) Sydney, New South Wales, Australia
- Party: Labor (from 2004)
- Other political affiliations: Nuclear Disarmament (1980s)
- Spouse: Doris Ricono (m. 1986)
- Children: 3
- Education: Australian National University (BA); University of New South Wales (LLB)
- Profession: Musician; songwriter; activist; politician; environmentalist
- Awards: Member of the Order of Australia (2003); Officer of the Ordre des Arts et des Lettres (France, 2009)
- Website: petergarrett.com.au

Peter Robert Garrett (born 16 March 1954) is an Australian musician, environmentalist, activist and former politician.

In 1973, Garrett became the lead singer of the Australian rock band Midnight Oil. As a performer he is known for his signature bald head, his eccentric dance style, and a "mesmerising onstage presence". He served as President of the Australian Conservation Foundation for ten years before being elected for the Labor Party as the Member of the House of Representatives for the seat of Kingsford Smith in the 2004 election.

After Labor's victory in the 2007 election, Garrett was appointed Minister for the Environment, Heritage and the Arts by Prime Minister Kevin Rudd. Following the 2010 election, he was made Minister for School Education, Early Childhood and Youth by Prime Minister Julia Gillard. In the aftermath of the 2013 leadership spill, Garrett resigned from the Ministry and announced he would retire from politics at the 2013 election.

In 2003, Garrett was appointed a Member of the Order of Australia, "for service to the community as a prominent advocate for environmental conservation and protection, and to the music industry." In 2009, the French Government appointed Garrett an Officer of the Order of Arts and Letters. In 2010, the World Wide Fund for Nature presented him with their Leaders for a Living Planet Award.

== Early life ==
Born on 16 March 1954, in Wahroonga, Sydney, Garrett was the eldest of three siblings. He suffered from severe asthma as a child. He attended Gordon West Public School and then Barker College in Hornsby before studying politics at the Australian National University (ANU), where he was a resident at Burgmann College, and later law at the University of New South Wales.

His father died from an asthma attack while Peter was in his teens, and his mother died in a fire at the family home when he was in his early twenties. Peter managed to escape the fire, but his mother was asleep upstairs and he was unable to rescue her.

== Musical career and activism ==
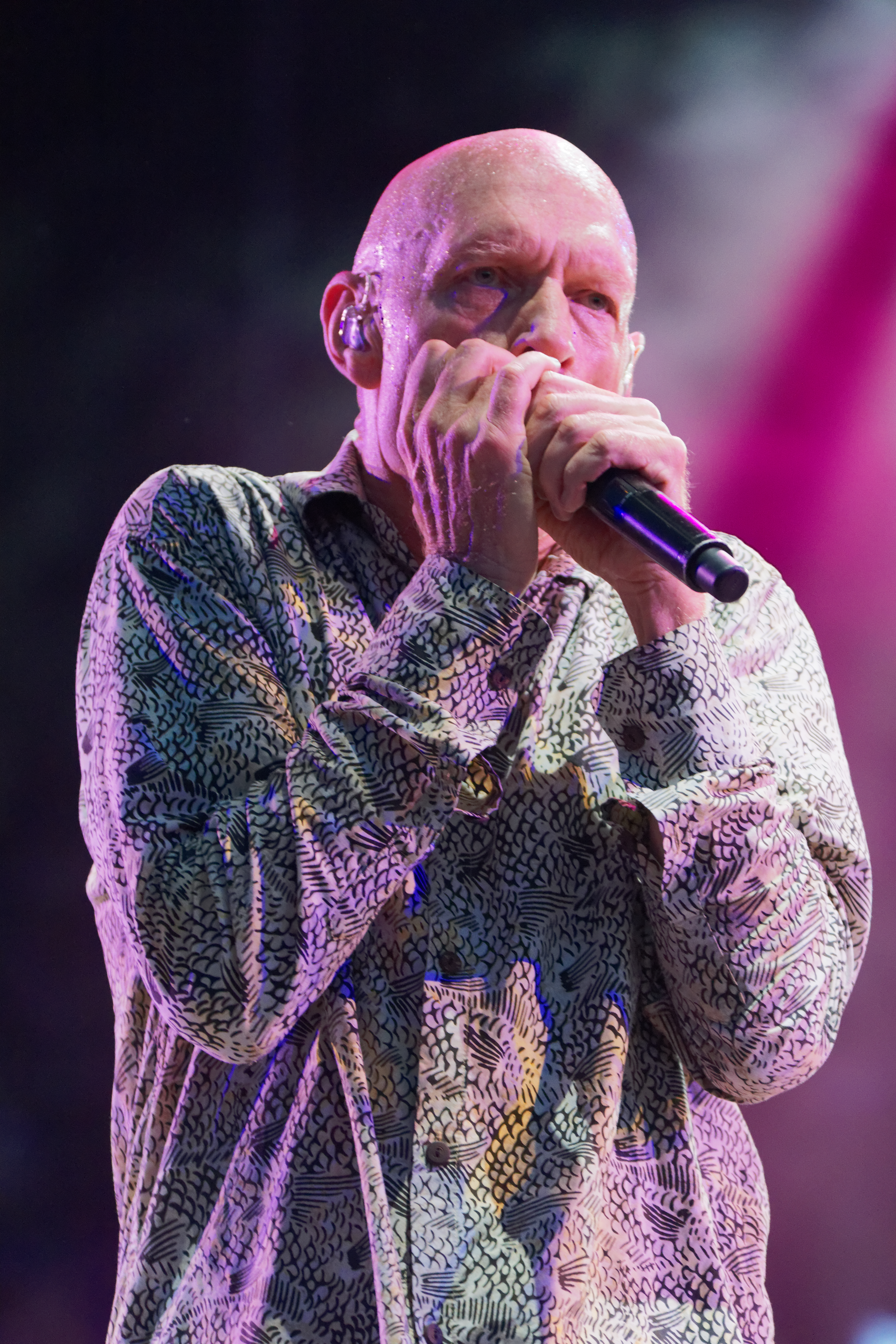
Garrett performing in 2017

In 1973, Garrett became the lead singer for the rock band Midnight Oil, after responding to an advertisement placed by one of the band's founding members, Rob Hirst. In tandem with their musical and commercial success, the band were strongly identified with environmental and Aboriginal rights causes. They were particularly critical of the military and foreign policy of the United States during the 1980s. On and off stage, Midnight Oil often made political statements. At the closing ceremony of the 2000 Olympic Games in Sydney, the group performed before then-Prime Minister, John Howard, and a television audience of hundreds of millions, wearing black overalls bearing the word "sorry". This referred to the Howard Government's refusal to apologise to Aboriginal Australians for the former policy of removing Aboriginal children from their families.

During his time with Midnight Oil, Garrett served two terms as President of the Australian Conservation Foundation (from 1989 to 1993 and 1998 to 2004). He was also invited to join the international board of Greenpeace in 1993 for a two-year term. He served as an adviser and patron to various cultural and community organisations, including Jubilee Debt Relief, and was a founding member of the Surfrider Foundation. In 2000, Garrett was awarded the Australian Humanitarian Foundation Award in the environment category and in 2001 he received an honorary Doctorate of Letters from the University of New South Wales. Garrett announced his departure from Midnight Oil in 2002, saying he wished to concentrate more fully on his environmental and social activism.

Although no longer part of the band, Garrett performed several times with Midnight Oil in the following years. After the Asian tsunami on 26 December 2004, Garrett joined the other members of Midnight Oil to perform as part of the fund-raising event WaveAid. On 7 July 2007, Garrett presented Crowded House at the Australian leg of Live Earth. On 14 March 2009, Garrett performed live at the Melbourne Cricket Ground with Midnight Oil for Sound Relief, in order to raise money for the Victorian bushfire appeal. In November 2012, Garrett and Paul Kelly inducted Yothu Yindi into the ARIA Hall of Fame and performed with the band their best-known song "Treaty".

On 5 May 2016, after the conclusion of his career in Parliament, Garrett announced that Midnight Oil would be reforming and that they would be touring in 2017, including a trip to the United States. Midnight Oil stated on their Facebook page: "We wanted you to be the first to know that the five of us are planning to do some gigs in Australia and overseas during 2017." Days later, Garrett also announced his first solo album, A Version of Now, which was released on 15 July. His second solo album, The True North, was released in March 2024.

== Political career ==
=== Nuclear Disarmament Party ===
Garrett's first attempt to enter the Australian Parliament came in December 1984, when the Nuclear Disarmament Party (NDP) invited him to stand for a New South Wales seat in the Australian Senate at the federal election. He refused at first, but after consulting his bandmates, he agreed on the condition that he head the ticket. He needed 12.5% of the statewide vote to win a seat in the Senate voting system, but a primary vote of 9.6% proved insufficient when Labor allocated its second preferences to the Democrats ahead of the NDP.

=== Australian Labor Party ===
==== Opposition (2004–2007) ====
After the conclusion of Garrett's term as President of the Australian Conservation Foundation ended, in June 2004 Labor Leader Mark Latham announced that Garrett would become an Australian Labor Party candidate for the House of Representatives at that year's federal election, in the safe New South Wales seat of Kingsford Smith which was being vacated by the former Cabinet Minister Laurie Brereton. There was some initial criticism from Labor members within the electorate, as the local branch had wished to select their own candidate; in the end, Garrett was comfortably elected for the seat in October 2004. In 2015, Garrett alleged in his autobiography and an ABC documentary that he had been handed an envelope containing "hundreds, if not thousands, of dollars" in cash by a representative of Clubs NSW at a function following the 2004 election. He subsequently retracted his allegations and stated that the envelope in fact contained a cheque, which he returned, and also that the incident "took place before he was elected, which would mean the possible offence of bribery or attempted bribery of a public official would not apply". Clubs NSW subsequently sued the ABC for defamation, but withdrew the suit in 2016 following a court ruling on discovery that would have granted the ABC access to the organisation's financial records.

Six months after entering parliament, Garrett was appointed Shadow Parliamentary Secretary for Reconciliation and the Arts. It was reported that he had modified some of his earlier views. He expressed support for the U.S.-Australia alliance, and recanted earlier opposition to the Joint U.S.-Australian Defence Facility at Pine Gap. He also stated that, while he would argue the case for environmentalism inside the Labor Party, he would observe the ultimate decision of the party caucus, including accepting any decision on the "no new uranium mines" policy. Garrett's change of stance drew criticism from both journalists and Midnight Oil fans, who contrasted Garrett's former pronouncements on environmental and political issues he had made before joining the Labor Party.

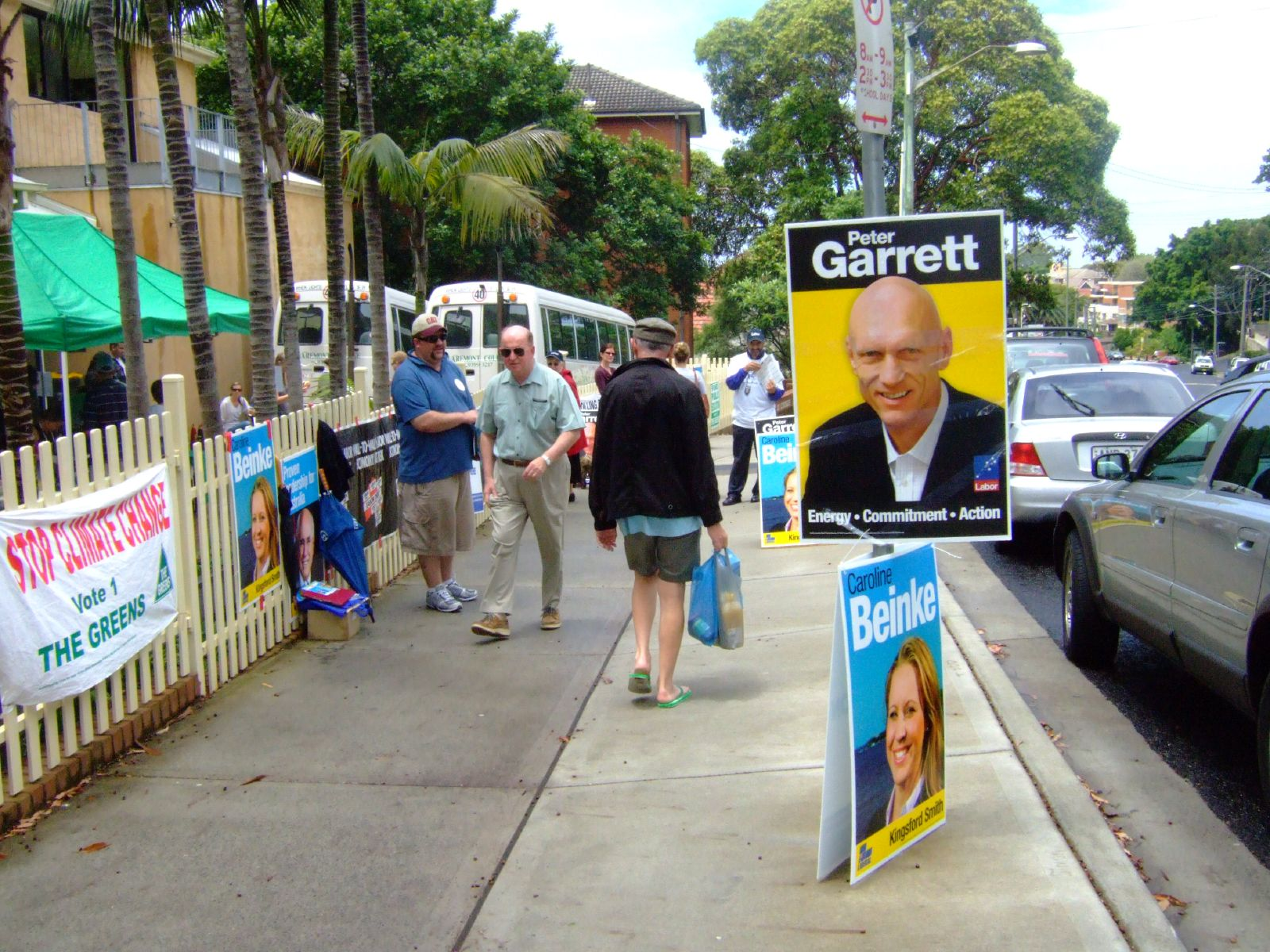
A Garrett poster at a polling booth, 2007

While some in the media labelled him a "turncoat", some, such as Eureka Street and the Canberra Times columnist and ANU academic John Warhurst, defended his need to be a "team player" if he was going to succeed in the political game "from the inside".

Garrett campaigned for Labor in the 2006 Victorian state election, in the campaign he sent a letter to voters in the seat of Melbourne, where Labor and the Greens were embroiled in a tight contest. In the letter Garrett urged voters not to vote for the Greens, claiming they were in alliance with the conservative Liberal Party. This incurred the ire of Greens Leader, and former Garrett ally, Bob Brown, who accused Garrett of having "sold out" and of going against the environmental movement since joining the Labor Party.

In December 2006, Kevin Rudd appointed Garrett to his Shadow Cabinet as Shadow Minister for Climate Change, the Environment, Heritage and the Arts. Garrett supported Rudd in that month's leadership spill, a decision he would later come to regret, saying years later that it was "certainly the biggest mistake" he made in his political career.

During the 2007 election campaign, Garrett caused some controversy after the journalist Steve Price claimed that Garrett had said to him Labor would change their policies if put in power. This was disputed by Garrett as a "short jocular conversation". Garrett was comfortably re-elected for Kingsford Smith in the election, with a 4.56% swing towards him.

==== Environment Minister (2007–2010) ====
After Labor's victory in the 2007 election, Prime Minister Kevin Rudd appointed Garrett as Minister for the Environment, Heritage and the Arts in the Cabinet, although responsibility for climate change was separated from the portfolio and handed to Senator Penny Wong. Although Garrett requested to represent the Government on climate change within the House of Representatives, Rudd instead gave that responsibility to Treasurer Wayne Swan.

In his first acts in the role, Garrett approved a controversial plan to dredge Melbourne's Port Phillip Bay. This move attracted criticism from some environmental groups, who were concerned that the 23 million cubic metres of sand, rock and contaminated silt dredged from the bay's shipping channels would affect fishing and tourism in the area. Garrett also refused federal funding that would have enabled a remount of Elke Neidhardt's Adelaide production of Der Ring des Nibelungen in 2008.

As Environment Minister, Garrett was responsible for implementing the Government's whaling conservation policy, which included the cessation of commercial and "scientific" whaling. The most controversial issue was Japan's annual trips to the Southern Ocean to kill whales in the name of science, with the Australian Government attempting to negotiate a cessation of "scientific" whaling at the annual meetings of the International Whaling Commission. These negotiations were unsuccessful, culminating in Australia taking Japan to the International Court of Justice (ICJ). Although the case was concluded after Garrett had left politics, the ICJ eventually announced its judgement, based on his application, that Japan must stop whaling in the Southern Ocean.

In August 2008, Garrett approved a major expansion of South Australia's Beverley uranium mine, saying the mine would demonstrate global best practice for environmental protection. Garrett's decision was praised by the uranium industry, but criticised by the Australian Conservation Foundation, the organisation Garrett previously led, which said the decision would result in the mine spreading acid and radioactive pollution over 100 square kilometres (39 sq mi). Later that year, Garrett announced the withdrawing of all A$2.6 million funding from the Australian National Academy of Music (ANAM).

In 2009, Garrett chose not to give the proposed A$2 billion Tamar Valley mill approval until more studies were undertaken on its potential impact on marine environments. A new condition was put on the mill, meaning Gunns could be liable for criminal and civil penalties if the mill was approved and broke defined "environmental limits". That same year saw Garrett also rejected proposals to impound the Mary River through the construction of the Traveston Crossing Dam. Garrett determined that the impacts of the proposed dam on the threatened species of Australian lungfish, the Mary River Turtle and the Mary River cod would be too great and of national environmental significance.

In a 2010 reshuffle of his Cabinet, Rudd demoted Garrett to the outer ministry in response to Garrett's administration of the Home Insulation Program (HIP), which was linked to four deaths, over 100 house fires and allegations of fraud. It was subsequently revealed in May 2010 that Garrett had written to Rudd on four occasions raising concerns about safety. Following the leadership spill in June 2010, which saw Rudd replaced by Julia Gillard, Garrett's colleague Gary Gray revealed most MPs believed Garrett was demoted because "...Rudd had a shocking interview on The 7.30 Report and needed a scapegoat". Gray stated:

The majority of caucus felt he had been badly treated. For Rudd and his office to position Garrett as the fall guy was disgraceful, weak, sneaky, unprincipled and just plain wrong. All along, Peter properly put his objections to the administration of the program on the record. How can you have a situation where Rudd executes complete and total influence, micromanages everything, yet not the home insulation program? The shape and execution of the program was certainly designed by the prime minister's office, if not the prime minister himself.

==== Education Minister (2010–2013) ====
Garrett initially retained the portfolio of Environment Minister in the First Gillard Ministry, and was re-elected at the 2010 election, albeit with a substantially reduced majority, suffering a two-party preferred negative swing against him of 8.1%. After the election, Gillard promoted him back to the full Cabinet as Minister for School Education, Early Childhood and Youth.

In September 2011, Garrett announced an alteration of the National School Chaplaincy Program by offering schools the opportunity to employ, instead of "a religious support worker" (chaplain), a "secular student well-being officer". In February 2012, Garrett, alongside Indigenous Affairs Minister Jenny Macklin, announced an expansion of the Improving School Enrollment and Attendance through Welfare Reform Measure (SEAM), a program through which parents of indigenous students in the Northern Territory can have their Centrelink payments suspended for three months if their children are not attending or enrolled in school. Though the Government claimed that the program improved indigenous school attendance, it was heavily criticised by some indigenous spokespeople and academics for being excessively punitive rather than implementing other policies that may have been far more effective in improving school attendance.

In 2013, Garrett pledged to increase funding to public schools as recommended in the Gonski Report, in order to reduce inequality in educational performance. In a 2014 book review, Garrett stated that he was concerned at the growth of private schools, which could lead to "an increasingly segregated school system". He noted that the National School Chaplaincy Program needed to change their guidelines because "the line between chaplains acting to support students in the provision of general pastoral care and proselytising was too easily crossed".

Garrett supported Gillard in both 2013 leadership spills. After the June spill, where Rudd defeated Gillard, Garrett immediately announced his resignation as Education Minister, and the following day declared that he would not seek re-election at the 2013 election, ending his career in Parliament after nine years.

== Other roles and activities ==
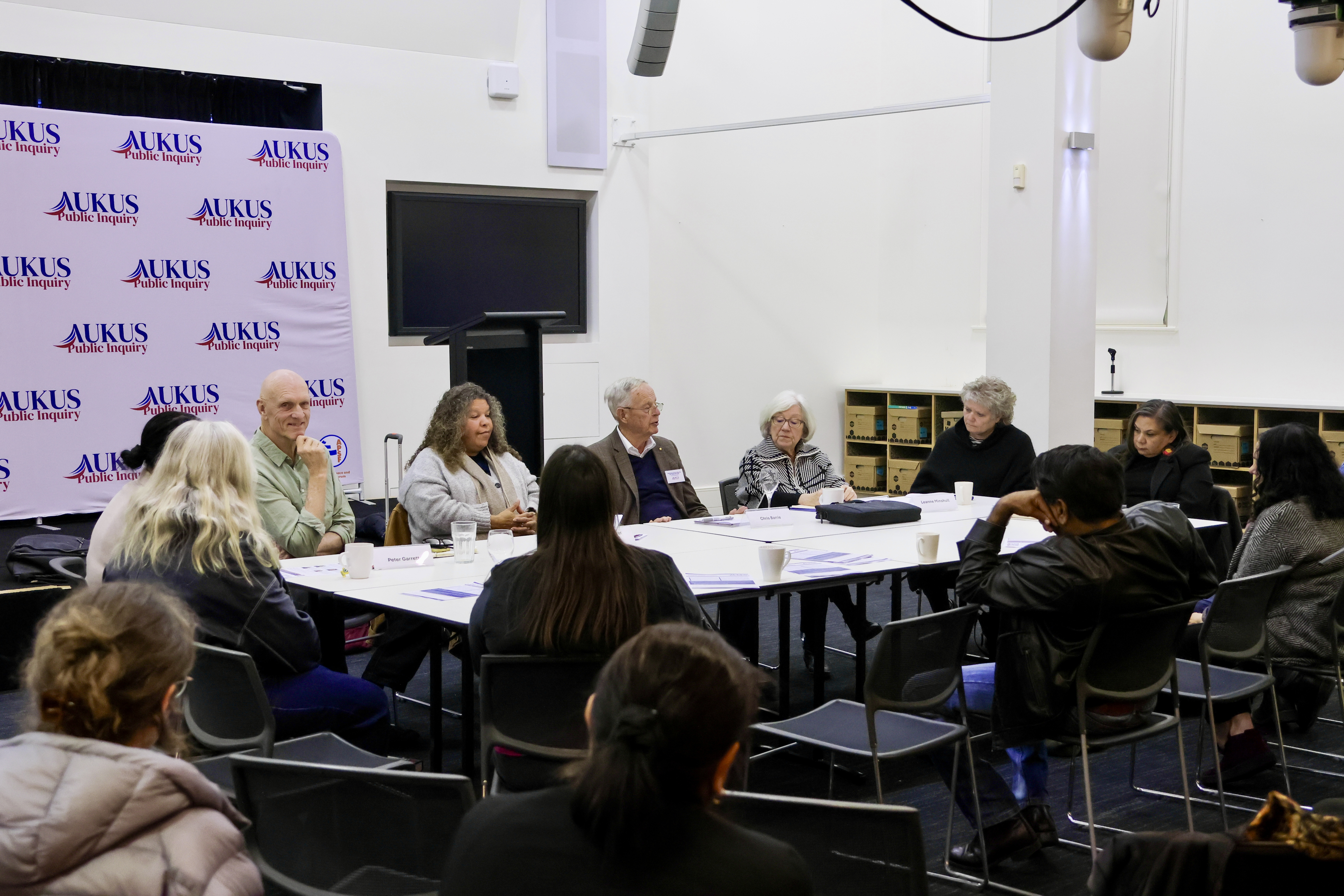
Garrett (left) and other commissioners at the 2026 AUKUS Public Inquiry in Adelaide

In September 2023, Garrett publicly advocated for the "Yes" campaign in the 2023 Australian Indigenous Voice referendum, a vote to change the Australian Constitution to enshrine a Voice to Parliament for Indigenous Australians. He also provided ongoing support of the Yes campaign in the lead up to the unsuccessful referendum.

In May 2026, Garrett was appointed chair of Landcare Australia.

In June 2026, Garrett was appointed to chair an inquiry into the AUKUS pact.

== Personal life ==
Garrett is married and has three daughters.

Garrett's grandfather, Tom Vernon Garrett, was one of many prisoners of war who died in the sinking of Montevideo Maru. He refers to this event in the opening line of the Earth and Sun and Moon track "In the Valley".

In 2007, artist Michael Mucci entered a portrait of Garrett in the Archibald Prize, while in 2022 Anh Do's portrait was a finalist.

Garrett supports the Essendon Bombers in the Australian Football League, although he has also shown favour to the Melbourne Demons as a secondary team when they faced Essendon rival Carlton in an AFL final.

== Discography ==
=== Solo ===
==== Studio albums ====
List of studio albums, with selected chart positions
Title	Album details	Peak chart positions		
Title	Album details	AUS	FRA	NZ
A Version of Now	Released: 15 July 2016; Label: Sony BMG Australia; Format: CD, digital download	3	142	35
The True North	Released: 15 March 2024; Label: Sony Music Australia; Format: CD, digital download	17	—	—

=== with Midnight Oil ===
- Midnight Oil (1978)
- Head Injuries (1979)
- Place without a Postcard (1981)
- 10, 9, 8, 7, 6, 5, 4, 3, 2, 1 (1982)
- Red Sails in the Sunset (1984)
- Diesel and Dust (1987)
- Blue Sky Mining (1990)
- Earth and Sun and Moon (1993)
- Breathe (1996)
- Redneck Wonderland (1998)
- Capricornia (2002)
- The Makarrata Project (2020)
- Resist (2022)

== Awards and nominations ==
=== APRA Awards ===
These annual awards were established by Australasian Performing Right Association (APRA) in 1982 to honour the achievements of songwriters and music composers and to recognise their song writing skills, sales and airplay performance, by its members annually. From 1982 to 1990, the best songs were given the Gold Award (also called the Special Award).

Year	Nominee / work	Award	Result
1989–90	"Beds Are Burning" (Peter Garrett, Robert Hirst, James Moginie)	Gold Award	Won
2001	"Beds Are Burning" (Garrett, Hirst, Moginie)	APRA Top 10 Australian songs	No. 3
2001	"Power and the Passion" (Garrett, Hirst, Moginie)	APRA Top 30 Australian songs	11–30
2018	Midnight Oil (Garrett, Hirst, Martin Rotsey, Moginie, Bones Hillman	Ted Albert Award for Outstanding Services to Australian Music	Won

=== ARIA Music Awards ===
The ARIA Music Awards are a set of annual ceremonies presented by Australian Recording Industry Association (ARIA), which recognise excellence, innovation, and achievement across all genres of the music of Australia. They commenced in 1987.

Year	Nominee / work	Award	Result	Ref.
1988	"Beds Are Burning" (Peter Garrett, Rob Hirst, Jim Moginie)	Song of the Year	Won	
1991	"Blue Sky Mine" (Garrett, Hirst, Moginie, Martin Rotsey, Bones Hillman)	Song of the Year	Nominated	
2006	Peter Garrett (as part of Midnight Oil)	Hall of Fame	Inducted	
2016	A Version of Now	Best Adult Alternative Album	Nominated	

=== Countdown Australian Music Awards ===
Countdown was an Australian pop music TV series on national broadcaster ABC-TV from 1974 to 1987, it presented music awards from 1979 to 1987, initially in conjunction with magazine TV Week. The TV Week / Countdown Awards were a combination of popular-voted and peer-voted awards.

Year	Nominee / work	Award	Result
1984	"Short Memory" – Peter Garrett (Midnight Oil)	Best Male Performance in a Video	Nominated

=== Environmental Music Prize ===
The Environmental Music Prize is a quest to find a theme song to inspire action on climate and conservation. It commenced in 2022.

Year	Nominee / work	Award	Result	Ref.
2025	"Innocence Parts 1 & 2"	Environmental Music Prize	Nominated	

== See also ==
- First Rudd Ministry
- First Gillard Ministry
- Second Gillard Ministry

Parliament of Australia
Preceded by Laurie Brereton	Member of Parliament for Kingsford Smith; 2004–2013	Succeeded by Matt Thistlethwaite
Political offices
Preceded by Malcolm Turnbull	Minister for the Environment, Heritage and the Arts; 2007–2010	Succeeded by Tony Burke
Preceded by Simon Crean	Minister for School Education, Early Childhood and Youth; 2010–2013	Succeeded by Bill Shorten
