= Only Murders in the Building season 3 =

Season of television series

Only Murders in the Building
- Season 3
- Promotional poster
- Starring: Steve Martin; Martin Short; Selena Gomez; Michael Cyril Creighton
- No. of episodes: 10

Release
- Original network: Hulu
- Original release: August 8 – October 3, 2023

Season chronology
- ← Previous; Season 2 Next → Season 4

The third season of the American mystery comedy-drama television series Only Murders in the Building premiered on August 8, 2023, on Hulu. The series follows a trio of strangers (played by Steve Martin, Martin Short, and Selena Gomez), all with a shared interest in true crime podcasts, who become friends while investigating murders in their apartment building, and producing their own podcast about the cases.

Michael Cyril Creighton was promoted to the main cast for the season after featuring in a recurring role in the previous seasons. Paul Rudd and Meryl Streep star in a special guest capacity in the season, and are credited with the main cast in the episodes they appear in.

In July 2022, Hulu greenlit Only Murders in the Building for a third season. Filming began in January 2023 in New York City, and wrapped in April 2023. The season consists of ten episodes, and had a two-episode premiere on August 8, 2023. The season received critical acclaim, receiving 21 nominations at the 76th Primetime Emmy Awards, with three wins.

== Cast and characters ==
=== Main ===
- Steve Martin as Charles-Haden Savage
- Martin Short as Oliver Putnam
- Selena Gomez as Mabel Mora
- Michael Cyril Creighton as Howard Morris

=== Special guest ===
- Paul Rudd as Ben Glenroy (Note: Credited as a special guest star alongside the main cast during the opening credits of episodes they appear in.)
- Meryl Streep as Loretta Durkin

=== Recurring ===
- Da'Vine Joy Randolph as Detective Donna Williams
- Jackie Hoffman as Uma Heller
- Andrea Martin as Joy Payne
- Jason Veasey as Jonathan Bridgecroft
- Linda Emond as Donna DeMeo
- Ashley Park as Kimber Min
- Jeremy Shamos as Dickie Glenroy
- Wesley Taylor as Clifford "Cliff" DeMeo
- Jesse Williams as Tobert
- Don Darryl Rivera as Bobo Malone
- Gerald Caesar as Ty Wessex
- Allison Guinn as K. T. Knoblauer
- Gerrard Lobo as Detective Biswas

=== Guest ===
- James Caverly as Theo Dimas
- Ryan Broussard as Will Putnam
- Teddy Coluca as Lester
- Jane Lynch as Sazz Pataki
- Tina Fey as Cinda Canning
- Noma Dumezweni as Maxine Spear
- Adrian Martinez as Gregg Rivera
- Peter Bartlett as Jerry Blau
- Matthew Broderick as a fictionalized version of himself
- Mel Brooks as himself

== Episodes ==
No. overall	No. in season	Title	Directed by	Written by	Original release date	Prod. code
21	1	"The Show Must…"	John Hoffman	John Hoffman & Sas Goldberg	August 8, 2023	3DWB01
At an audition for Oliver's murder mystery play Death Rattle, a struggling actress, Loretta Durkin, amazes him with her performance. Four months later, at the play's read-through, the cast and crew meet for the first time, including Howard as Oliver's assistant, Charles in a supporting role, and Ben Glenroy in the lead role. Loretta fails to deliver her lines convincingly, so Ben urges Oliver to fire her, but Oliver is convinced of Loretta's talent. In the present, Ben is pronounced dead by the authorities after collapsing on stage. At the play's planned after-party, Mabel floats the theory to Oliver that Ben was poisoned and proposes a new podcast. A revived Ben appears at the party, attributing his clinical death to food poisoning. He gives a phony apology to everyone for his arrogant behavior over the last few months, but veiledly insults Loretta again. Afterward, Mabel tells Charles and Oliver that her aunt sold her apartment, so she is moving out of the Arconia in a month. As they take the elevator, Ben's dead body suddenly crashes down in front of them.
22	2	"The Beat Goes On"	John Hoffman	Ben Smith & Joshua Allen Griffith	August 8, 2023	3DWB02
At Ben's funeral, Mabel and Charles meet Gregg, who claims to have worked for Ben as a security guard. Instead, Gregg is revealed to be an obsessed fan of Ben's, and kidnaps them. In Gregg's custody, Mabel tells Charles that Ben's murder is personal to her because one of his shows helped her overcome her father's death, while Charles reveals that the tension between him and Ben stemmed from when he unintentionally got Ben fired from Brazzos years earlier. Gregg intends to torture the pair into confessing to Ben's murder, but Detective Biswas arrives with the police and arrests him as Ben's killer based on Gregg's obsession and his whereabouts at the time of the murder. Mabel, however, theorizes that since Gregg had Ben's handkerchief from the play and the body was found holding an identical one, Gregg could not have committed the murder. She and Charles agree to begin a third podcast to find Ben's real killer, about which Oliver is reluctant. Following a minor heart attack he suffered after encountering a critic who was planning to pan his play, he becomes inspired to turn the show into a musical.
23	3	"Grab Your Hankies"	Adam Shankman	Matteo Borghese & Rob Turbovsky	August 15, 2023	3DWB03
Charles attempts to find out which cast member lost their handkerchief, believing that one could be the killer. Concurrently, Mabel goes to Ben's apartment looking for clues and meets Tobert, Ben's documentarian. They are forced to hide when Dickie, Ben's brother and manager, enters the apartment, during which Tobert reveals he intends to make a documentary about Ben's murder and that he has footage of Ben before he collapsed on stage. Meanwhile, Loretta tells Oliver she has won a television series role in Los Angeles that begins shooting next week. Not wanting to lose her, Oliver reminds her that she is under contract, but later agrees to let her go if she performs her character's lullaby for the producers, Donna and Cliff. Amazed by her performance, they agree to fund Death Rattle Dazzle, prompting Loretta to stay as well, and she and Oliver kiss. Tobert shows Mabel footage of Ben in his dressing room talking to someone off camera. At the same time, Charles discovers that cast member Kimber, who plays Ben's love interest, lost her handkerchief.
24	4	"The White Room"	Adam Shankman	J. J. Philbin	August 22, 2023	3DWB04
The trio suspects that Kimber killed Ben due to an affair gone awry between them. Kimber, however, tells Mabel she only wanted Ben to promote her beauty products, and when he backed out at the last minute, she sold her handkerchief. She also reveals that Ben was upset on opening night about a red mark on his face until someone in his dressing room fixed it. Charles and Oliver break into Ben's dressing room, finding "Fucking Pig" written on his mirror with lipstick. Later, Cinda approaches Mabel with a job offer, but Mabel turns it down. Meanwhile, Charles has to perform a patter song in the play, but every time he rehearses it, he enters "The White Room", a comforting place inside his mind, while his body acts disturbingly without his knowledge. Oliver thinks this is caused by the pressure of his girlfriend, Joy, moving in with him, which Charles is not ready for. When he attempts to tell her that, Charles enters The White Room again, reemerging to discover he has proposed to Joy, while she recognizes the lipstick from Ben's dressing room as her own.
25	5	"Ah, Love!"	Chris Koch	Tess Morris & Noah Levine	August 29, 2023	3DWB05
While Oliver goes on a date with Loretta, Mabel meets with Tobert at a restaurant to observe Jonathan, Ben's understudy and Howard's boyfriend. They see him exchanging something with a man, whom Tobert identifies as Ben's doctor. Meanwhile, following a fight between Charles and Joy about the lipstick, Charles is visited by Sazz, who gives him an impromptu therapy session about his relationship problems. Oliver and Loretta eat dinner at her place, but Oliver is surprised when Loretta calls Ben a "fucking pig" and confesses to him that she had a scuffle with Ben on opening night. Joy explains to Charles that she simply left her lipstick at Ben's dressing room after she fixed a mark on his face, which Charles reveals was because he punched Ben for his scuffle with Loretta. Charles also reveals that his proposal was accidental, causing Joy to break up with him. Mabel takes Tobert back to her apartment to show him her board of clues, and they kiss. Oliver and Loretta sleep together in her apartment, where he later finds a scrapbook full of news clippings about Ben.
26	6	"Ghost Light"	Chris Koch	Madeleine George	September 5, 2023	3DWB06
After Howard claims to have seen the ghost of a deceased actor at the theater, the trio goes there to investigate. Mabel and Tobert confront Jonathan about his meeting with Ben's doctor; he confesses that he obtained the same cocktail of medications Ben used to cope with the pressure of being the lead, a role he never wanted. Oliver discovers that his former director friend, Jerry, pretended to be the ghost to hide that he has been living in the theater's attic for months. He also tells Oliver about the fight between Ben, Loretta, and Charles, which he witnessed firsthand. Despite growing increasingly suspicious of Loretta, Oliver chooses to hide his suspicion from Charles and Mabel, who find him trying to scrub the lipstick. An argument erupts, in which Oliver accuses Charles of not being forthcoming about the fight, frustrating Charles into quitting the play. Oliver also accuses Mabel of sabotaging his show with her investigation, causing her to reveal Cinda's offer and vow to continue investigating on her own.
27	7	"CoBro"	Cherien Dabis	Ben Philippe & Jake Schnesel	September 12, 2023	3DWB07
Charles discovers that Uma stole the handkerchief from Ben's corpse; however, she sells it to an unknown buyer before he can retrieve it. Meanwhile, Oliver replaces Charles with Matthew Broderick, but soon fires him and rehires Charles after growing annoyed with Broderick's method acting antics. Elsewhere, Mabel learns from Dickie that he was adopted before his parents conceived Ben and that he was always overshadowed by Ben's success despite doing most of the work for it. Finding an old drawing of CoBro, Ben's most famous role, and looking at the signature below, Mabel theorizes with Tobert and Theo that Dickie could have created the character, giving him a motive to kill. Oliver shows Charles the scrapbook he stole from Loretta, and they decide to give it to Mabel, only to learn that Mabel has already moved out of her apartment and that she started the podcast's new season without them. Listening to the first episode, which details evidence that Gregg is not the killer, Detective Biswas decides to reopen Ben's case.
28	8	"Sitzprobe"	Shari Springer Berman & Robert Pulcini	Pete Swanson & Siena Streiber	September 19, 2023	3DWB08
Flashbacks reveal that Dickie is Loretta's biological son, whom she gave up for adoption to pursue her acting career. Nonetheless, she had always kept tabs on him by collecting news about him and Ben, and upon learning their involvement in Oliver's play, she auditioned for a role to be reunited with him. At the musical's sitzprobe, she decides to tell Dickie the truth in a letter, but the police arrive and lock down the theater, saying the killer is someone from the cast or crew. The trio make amends with each other and decide to work together again to find the killer. While Charles and Oliver secretly record Detective Williams's interrogations of the cast, Mabel helps Howard reassemble a shredded document that might be a clue. Loretta learns that the police and the trio suspect Dickie as the killer, which she refuses to believe. Charles and Mabel find Loretta's letter, while Oliver returns the scrapbook to her and confesses his love for her. During her rehearsal on stage, Loretta sees the police approaching Dickie, so she confesses to Ben's murder to save him. As she is led out of the theater in handcuffs, Oliver suffers another heart attack and collapses.
29	9	"Thirty"	Cherien Dabis	Elaine Ko	September 26, 2023	3DWB09
Following Oliver's recovery, the trio learns that Dickie has an alibi for the time of Ben's murder. Using their knowledge and the clues they already obtained, they recreate the last 30 minutes before Ben collapsed on stage: Ben arrived late to the theater after being with his seamstress friends, who helped him make the handkerchiefs he presented to the cast and crew. Later, he overheard Loretta encouraging Dickie to quit as his manager due to the stress he was under, resulting in a fallout between the brothers and the fight between Ben, Charles, and Loretta. An upset Ben then fired Tobert and retreated to his dressing room, where he ate a cookie and wrote "Fucking Pig" on his mirror out of guilt for ruining his diet. Howard gives the trio the reassembled document, which turns out to be an early negative review of Ben's performance. The trio reaches the conclusion that Donna poisoned Ben to prevent the show and Cliff's career from being ruined. They run into the court to stop Loretta from pleading guilty, only to learn that Donna is among the witnesses.
30	10	"Opening Night"	Jamie Babbit	John Hoffman & Ben Smith	October 3, 2023	3DWB10
After Loretta receives the missing handkerchief from Dickie, the trio uses it as evidence to force a confession out of Donna on the opening night of Death Rattle Dazzle. To their surprise, she readily confesses to Ben's murder but asks to see the play before she is arrested. Oliver takes the lead role when Jonathan cannot perform, having taken too much anti-anxiety medication, and Loretta finally tells Dickie she is his biological mother. Mabel notices Cliff going to the theater's attic after a conversation with Donna, and confronts him upon realizing he pushed Ben down the elevator shaft. A guilt-ridden Cliff insists it was an accident and attempts to commit suicide by jumping from above the stage but is stopped and comforted by Donna. The two are taken into custody as the show ends with a success. At the play's after-party, Dickie, Loretta, and Tobert reveal they all have upcoming gigs in Los Angeles, but the trio decide to stay in New York. Sazz comes to celebrate and tells Charles they need to talk before entering Charles's apartment, where she is shot by an unknown assailant.

== Production ==
=== Development ===
On July 11, 2022, following the premiere of the second season, Hulu renewed Only Murders in the Building for a ten-episode third season. The season was announced with co-creators Steve Martin and John Hoffman serving as executive producers, along with stars Martin Short and Selena Gomez, and Dan Fogelman and Jess Rosenthal.

=== Casting ===
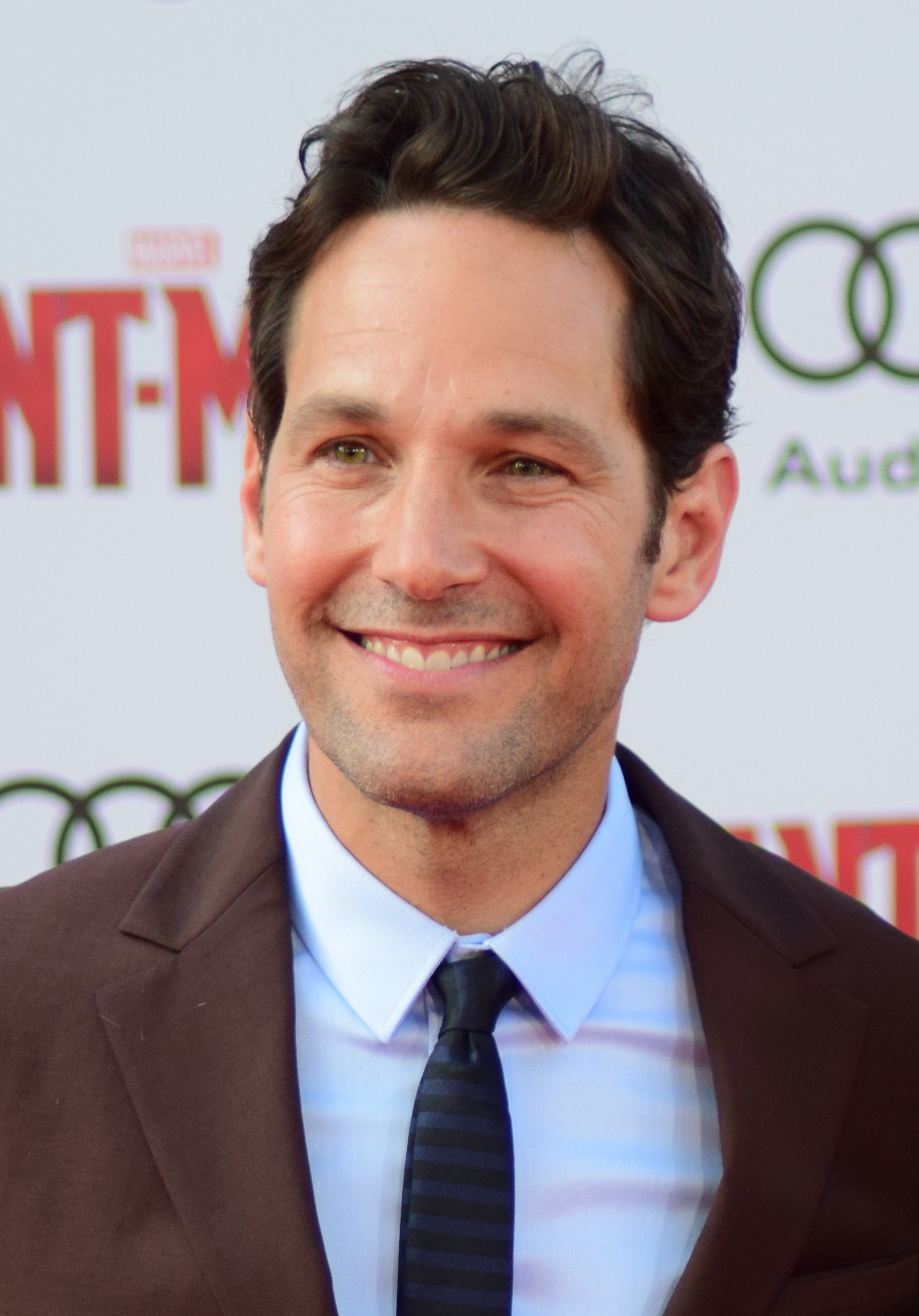
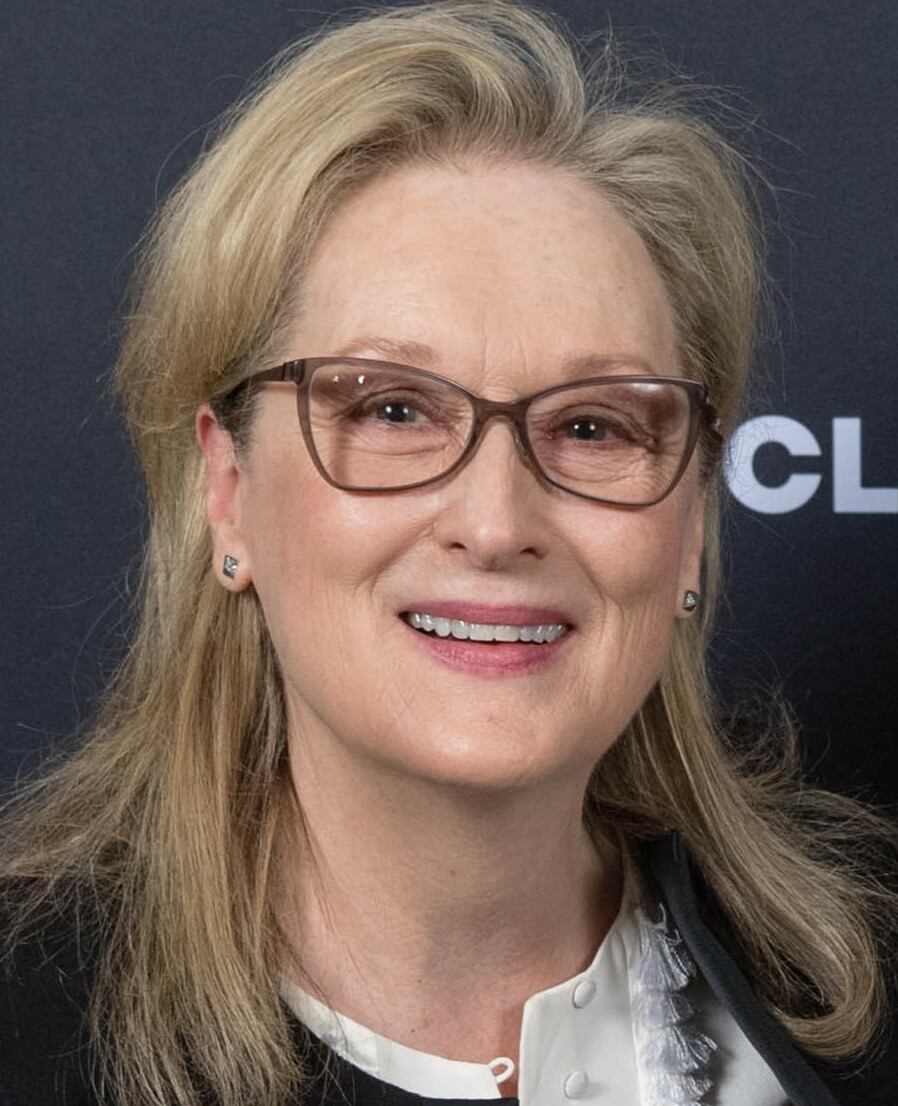
Paul Rudd and Meryl Streep star in a special guest capacity in the season, and are credited along with the main cast in the episodes they appear in.

In August 2022, it was announced that Paul Rudd had joined the cast for the third season, after appearing in a cameo at the end of the second season. In October 2022, Jesse Williams was cast in a recurring capacity for the season. In January 2023, Meryl Streep was cast in an undisclosed capacity for the season. In February 2023, Ashley Park joined the cast in a recurring role for the season. In March 2023, Jeremy Shamos, Linda Emond, Wesley Taylor, Don Darryl Rivera, Allison Guinn, and Gerald Caesar were cast in recurring capacities for the season. In April 2023, Michael Cyril Creighton was promoted to series regular for the season, after featuring in a recurring role in the previous season.

=== Writing ===
The episodes in the season were written by John Hoffman, Sas Goldberg, Ben Smith, Joshua Allen Griffith, Matteo Borghese, Rob Turbovsky, J. J. Philbin, Tess Morris, Noah Levine, Madeleine George, Ben Philippe, Jake Schnesel, Pete Swanson, Siena Streiber and Elaine Ko.

=== Filming ===
Filming for the third season began in January 2023, in New York City, and concluded in late April of the same year.

=== Music ===
An album for the third season was released on September 15, 2023, followed by a deluxe edition on October 4. The soundtrack for the season was wholly composed by Siddhartha Khosla.

All music is composed by Siddhartha Khosla.

No.	Title	Writer(s)	Performer(s)	Length
1.	"Look for the Light"	Benj Pasek, Justin Paul & Sara Bareilles	Meryl Streep & Ashley Park	2:31
2.	"Loretta"			2:57
3.	"Falling"			0:45
4.	"B Glenroy"			1:23
5.	"You Gotta Be F'n Kidding Me"			1:24
6.	"Church Entry"			0:33
7.	"Hashtag Bloody Mabel"			1:31
8.	"Mabel and Ben"			0:48
9.	"Heart Attack"			2:01
10.	"After KT Yelled at Him"			0:44
11.	"White Room"			0:42
12.	"The Very Beginning"			0:41
13.	"Memories Fade"			1:50
14.	"Punched"			0:53
15.	"In Love with Loretta"			1:33
16.	"Baby Elephant Story"			0:48
17.	"Ah, Love"			1:08
18.	"Banish Your Ghosts"			1:09
19.	"White Room, Again"			0:42
20.	"Cake"			3:26
21.	"Tender Ender"			1:23
22.	"Meaning of F Pig"			1:49
23.	"Father of the Bride"			2:00
24.	"Oh, Irene"			0:57
25.	"Arrested"			2:21
26.	"Opening Night"			1:02
27.	"It Was an Accident Mom"			2:38
28.	"Gives Birth"			1:51
29.	"Another Murder in the Building"			1:07
30.	"Something to Confess"			1:10
Total length:				43:00

Only Murders in the Building: Season 3 (Original Soundtrack) – Deluxe Edition
No.	Title	Writer(s)	Performer(s)	Length
1.	"Look for the Light"	Benj Pasek, Justin Paul & Sara Bareilles	Meryl Streep & Ashley Park	2:31
2.	"Which of the Pickwick Triplets Did It?"	Benj Pasek, Justin Paul, Marc Shaiman & Scott Wittman	Steve Martin	2:47
3.	"Creatures of the Night"	Benj Pasek & Justin Paul	Martin Short	2:34
4.	"For the Sake of a Child (Oliver Version)"	Benj Pasek, Justin Paul & Michael R. Jackson	Meryl Streep & Martin Short	3:14
5.	"For the Sake of a Child (Ben Version)"	Benj Pasek, Justin Paul & Michael R. Jackson	Meryl Streep & Paul Rudd	3:13
6.	"Love's Old Sweet Song"	James Lynam Molloy & Graham Clifton Bingham	Jason Veasey	1:20
7.	"Meet Me Tonight in Dreamland"	Leo Friedman & Beth Slater Whitson	Jason Veasey	2:22
8.	"Loretta"			2:57
9.	"Falling"			0:45
10.	"B Glenroy"			1:23
11.	"You Gotta Be F'n Kidding Me"			1:24
12.	"Church Entry"			0:33
13.	"Hashtag Bloody Mabel"			1:31
14.	"Mabel and Ben"			0:48
15.	"Heart Attack"			2:01
16.	"After KT Yelled at Him"			0:44
17.	"White Room"			0:42
18.	"The Very Beginning"			0:41
19.	"Memories Fade"			1:50
20.	"Punched"			0:53
21.	"In Love with Loretta"			1:33
22.	"Baby Elephant Story"			0:48
23.	"Ah, Love"			1:08
24.	"Banish Your Ghosts"			1:09
25.	"White Room, Again"			0:42
26.	"Cake"			3:26
27.	"Tender Ender"			1:23
28.	"Meaning of F Pig"			1:49
29.	"Father of the Bride"			2:00
30.	"Oh, Irene"			0:57
31.	"Arrested"			2:21
32.	"Opening Night"			1:02
33.	"It Was an Accident Mom"			2:38
34.	"Gives Birth"			1:51
35.	"Another Murder in the Building"			1:07
36.	"Something to Confess"			1:10
Total length:				59:00

== Release ==
The third season premiered on August 8, 2023, on Hulu. Subsequent episodes released weekly until the season finale on October 3, 2023.

== Reception ==
=== Critical response ===
For the third season of Only Murders in the Building, the review aggregator website Rotten Tomatoes reported a 96% approval rating with an average rating of 7.95/10, based on 114 critic reviews. The website's critics consensus reads, "Relocating the action to the theatre, Only Murders in the Building can take a bow for yet another twisty mystery handled with a good-humored touch." Metacritic gave the third season a weighted average score of 77 out of 100 based on 33 critic reviews, indicating "generally favorable" reviews.

=== Accolades ===
The third season received 21 nominations at the 76th Primetime Emmy Awards, with three wins at the Creative Arts Emmy Awards. Notable nominations included Outstanding Comedy Series, Martin and Short for Outstanding Lead Actor in a Comedy Series, Selena Gomez for Outstanding Lead Actress in a Comedy Series, Paul Rudd for Outstanding Supporting Actor in a Comedy Series, Meryl Streep for Outstanding Supporting Actress in a Comedy Series, Matthew Broderick for Outstanding Guest Actor in a Comedy Series, and Da'Vine Joy Randolph for Outstanding Guest Actress in a Comedy Series. The song "Which of the Pickwick Triplets Did It?", which was featured in the eighth episode of the third season, won the Primetime Emmy Award for Outstanding Original Music and Lyrics, with two of its four songwriters, Benj Pasek and Justin Paul, becoming the 20th and 21st EGOT winners.
