= Only Murders in the Building season 5 =

Season of television series

Only Murders in the Building
- Season 5
- Promotional poster
- Starring: Steve Martin; Martin Short; Selena Gomez; Michael Cyril Creighton
- No. of episodes: 10

Release
- Original network: Hulu
- Original release: September 9 – October 28, 2025

Season chronology
- ← Previous; Season 4

The fifth season of the American mystery comedy-drama television series Only Murders in the Building, often abbreviated as OMITB, premiered on September 9, 2025, on Hulu. The season stars Steve Martin, Martin Short, and Selena Gomez as a trio of friends producing true crime podcasts that investigate murder cases in their apartment building, often assisted by their neighbor (Michael Cyril Creighton).

In September 2024, Hulu greenlit Only Murders in the Building for a fifth season. Filming took place from March to June 2025. The season consists of ten episodes.

== Cast and characters ==
=== Main ===
- Steve Martin as Charles-Haden Savage
- Martin Short as Oliver Putnam
- Selena Gomez as Mabel Mora
- Michael Cyril Creighton as Howard Morris

=== Special guest ===
- Meryl Streep (Note: Credited as a special guest star during the opening credits in the season alongside the main cast in the episodes she appears in.) as Loretta Durkin

=== Recurring ===
- Da'Vine Joy Randolph as Detective Donna Williams
- Téa Leoni as Sofia Caccimelio
- Bobby Cannavale as Nicky Caccimelio
- Teddy Coluca as Lester Coluca
- Dianne Wiest as Lorraine Coluca
- Renée Zellweger as Camila White
- Christoph Waltz as Sebastian "Bash" Steed
- Logan Lerman as Jay Pflug
- Jackie Hoffman as Uma Heller
- Beanie Feldstein as Althea (a.k.a. "Thē")
- Keegan-Michael Key as Mayor Beau Tillman
- Richard Kind as Vince Fish
- Nathan Lane as Teddy Dimas
- Paul Rudd as the voice of L.E.S.T.R. (Note: Uncredited except for the final episode.)
- Jermaine Fowler as Randall Winston
- Shea Buckner as Tony Caccimelio
- Dane DiLiegro as Johnny Caccimelio
- Aaron Dean Eisenberg as Braden Caccimelio
- Cory Jeacoma as Mikey Caccimelio
- Evan Mulrooney as Vinny Caccimelio
- Elizabeth D'Onofrio as Nonna

=== Guest ===
- Vanessa Aspillaga as Ursula
- Russell G. Jones as Dr. Grover Stanley
- Emory Cohen as young Lester Coluca
- Julian Cihi as Tim Kono
- Siobhan Fallon Hogan as Mrs. Morris
- Jayne Houdyshell as Bunny Folger
- Adriane Lenox as Roberta Putnam
- Tony Plana as George
- Madison Wray as young Rainey
- Jane Lynch as Sazz Pataki
- David Patrick Kelly as Miller
- Becky Ann Baker as Linda
- Dylan Baker as Ron
- James Caverly as Theo Dimas
- Tina Fey as Cinda Canning

== Episodes ==
No. overall	No. in season	Title	Directed by	Written by	Original release date	Prod. code
41	1	"Nail in the Coffin"	John Hoffman	John Hoffman & Taylor Cox	September 9, 2025	5DWB02
On the day of Lester's funeral, the trio finds a severed finger, confirming their suspicions that Lester's death was not accidental as the police claimed. After Charles checks Lester's body in the coffin and sees that none of his fingers are missing, Oliver learns from his wedding photos that Lester was talking to a man identified as mobster Nicky Caccimelio. They go to Staten Island and meet Nicky's sons and his wife, Sofia, who previously wanted to hire them to investigate Nicky's disappearance. She explains that their family has a dry cleaning business, owning the dry cleaner in the Arconia as well, and tells them about Nicky's gambling addiction. She gives them Nicky's favorite deck of cards as a clue, and Charles discovers that one of the cards is magnetic and contains a hidden map. He and Mabel follow the map, which leads them to a secret casino room underneath the Arconia. At the same time, Oliver finds Nicky's dead body at the Caccimelios' dry cleaner.
42	2	"After You"	John Hoffman	Ben Smith & Ella Robinson Brooks	September 9, 2025	5DWB01
Before his death, Lester participated in an interview for a study about New York City doormen. He told how he started his job in 1993, mentored by his colleague George. On his first day, he met Charles, Oliver, baby Mabel, and his future wife, Lorraine. Over the years, he assisted the trio through various points in their lives and discovered that George received extra money from Nicky Caccimelio for letting certain people in at his request. After George retired, he introduced Lester to Nicky, who gave Lester the same task. For years, he earned a good income from the commission, although Nicky refused to let him quit when he wanted to. As the number of murders in the building increased recently, Lester hired another doorman, Randall, who started his first shift on Oliver's wedding day. A flash-forward depicts Lester that night fleeing from someone who eventually murders him in the Arconia's fountain with an elevator crank.
43	3	"Rigor"	Chris Koch	Max Searle	September 9, 2025	5DWB03
Oliver takes Nicky's body to Charles's apartment after accidentally leaving his DNA on it. Not wanting to involve the police, who might link them to the murder, the trio performs an autopsy themselves. They figure out that Nicky died around the same time as Lester but was frozen, preventing decomposition. They also find a piece of paper in his mouth from Lester's ledger. While Oliver borrows the ledger from Randall, Mabel runs into her former friend, Althea, who is now a famous pop singer and moving into the Arconia penthouse. Charles secretly takes Nicky's body back to the dry cleaner, where it is later found by corrupt police officers who cover up the incident. The trio learns from Lester's ledger the date of an upcoming poker game in the secret casino room, so they decide to attend. There, they see three of New York's richest people arrive, and that one of them, pharmaceutical tycoon heir Jay Pflug, is missing a finger.
44	4	"Dirty Birds"	Chris Koch	Kristin Newman	September 16, 2025	5DWB04
Assuming Jay's involvement in Nicky's and Lester's murder due to his missing finger, the trio tricks him into coming over for an interrogation. They record the podcast's season five teaser, hinting that Jay and his billionaire friends might be murderers, which prompts Jay to agree to meet them to clear his name. He arrives along with tech mogul Bash Steed and hotelier Camila White, who all threaten to sue the trio for libel. The trio talks with each of the billionaires privately to make them confess; Charles and Oliver bond with Bash and Camila over their common views on life, while Mabel and Jay discuss their trust issues, with Mabel explaining how her friendship with Althea strained after the latter became famous. The billionaires then tell them a drugged Nicky chopped off Jay's finger with a cleaver. The trio receives a podcast publishing deal from Wondify. (Note: A fictionalized version of Wondery.) Just as they sign the contract, they realize that Jay's missing finger and the one they found are not the same, but legally they cannot accuse the billionaires of lying due to them being the new majority ownership of Wondify. They are shocked to learn that they have been set up.
45	5	"Tongue Tied"	Shari Springer Berman & Robert Pulcini	J. J. Philbin	September 23, 2025	5DWB05
Oliver and Mabel try to obtain information about a person known as "Tommy the Tongue" after learning he used to cover up all illegal activities in the casino room. During their investigation, they discover that the Arconia's new robot doorman named L.E.S.T.R. (Logic Engineered Secure Tenant Robot) disturbs the staff about their jobs becoming redundant, so they hold a building meeting to settle things down. The meeting turns into a riot, ending with the staff destroying L.E.S.T.R. who incidentally contained digital copies of Lester's paperwork. Meanwhile, Charles meets Sofia to find out what she knows about the casino room, but she seduces him and they sleep together. The next morning, he realizes he lost his phone in Sofia's car. Using a tracking app, the trio follows the route of the car, while receiving a call from Detective Williams who reveals that "Tommy the Tongue" is actually a shell company that handles Nicky's gambling money. As Williams tells them that all the money was drawn from the company recently, the trio sees Sofia arriving to a secret meeting with Lorraine.
46	6	"Flatbush"	Shari Springer Berman & Robert Pulcini	John Enbom & Jake Schnesel	September 30, 2025	5DWB06
Loretta comes back to New York after her apartment burns down, and helps the investigation. She and Oliver go to Flatbush in disguise and follow Sofia and Lorraine to an old theater. Oliver recalls his childhood there and how the theater meant an escape to him from his emotionally unavailable foster parents. They confront Sofia and Lorraine, but they turn out to be innocent, planning to donate Nicky's gambling money to renovate the theater. Meanwhile, Charles, Mabel and Williams discover that the finger is gone, and Althea tells them she heard someone break into Charles's apartment. Upon checking the security footage, they find nothing, causing Mabel to send Althea away, but later regrets it and apologizes. Althea reminds her that Mabel abandoned her first after Zoe's death and reveals that her hit song was actually written about her admiration for Mabel. They mend their friendship. Later, Williams discovers that the security footage was edited and that the camera's distribution company belongs to Bash. He mockingly reveals himself through a dating profile Charles texted with, which he used to gain information about him.
47	7	"Silver Alert"	Jessica Yu	Taylor Cox & Pete Swanson	October 7, 2025	5DWB07
The trio interviews Mayor Tillman for the podcast, and he tells them about Bash's political influence on his mayoral campaign. He gives them his address in the countryside so they can snoop around there. The trio visits Bash's mansion, finding him, Camila and Jay holding a game night. Charles and Mabel challenge them in a game of "Name That Person, Place, Thing" and win due to their category being Broadway and they use their knowledge from Oliver's personal stories. As a winning prize, the billionaires confess to them that on the night of Nicky's and Lester's murder, they discussed over a poker game which one of them will obtain the rights to build New York City's first casino. Jay also slips that the severed finger has a crucial role in whoever will obtain the rights, but refuses to explain why. The trio retrieves the finger and flee the mansion. Later, Camila visits and forces them at gunpoint to give her the finger. They surrender it as Camila reveals her plan to turn the Arconia into a casino.
48	8	"Cuckoo Chicks"	Jessica Yu	Kristin Newman & McKenna Thurber	October 14, 2025	5DWB08
Camila organizes an exclusive game night in the casino room for women only, for which Althea receives an invitation and gives it to Mabel. She wants to use this opportunity to extract a confession from Camila, and invites Williams, Loretta, and Lorraine for help. Posing as a psychic, Loretta makes Camila tell her that she was in love with Nicky, so she proposed a partnership to expand his casino to the entire building. Initially hesitant due to the casino being Sofia's inheritance, Nicky agreed after discovering that his wife was cheating on him. Meanwhile, Charles and Oliver learn that Camila has gained controlling share in the Arconia by buying up 51% of the apartments. They fail to convince the last seller, Dr. Grover Stanley, to change his mind before the sale is finalized. Loretta finds the blooded elevator crank in Nicky's office, while Lorraine accidentally activates a bird-watching camera that Lester used to record himself before dying. The footage reveals that Randall found and removed the crank from the crime scene.
49	9	"LESTR"	Jamie Babbit	Max Searle & Alex Bigelow	October 21, 2025	5DWB09
Randall escapes when the trio tries to confront him and disappears for the next 19 days, while the deadline for residents to move out of the Arconia expires. Faced without a new lead, the trio gives up the investigation. On their last night in the Arconia, however, Mabel discovers a secret passage in the casino room that Randall used to hide inside the building for the last few days. The residents catch and force Randall to confess, but he says he cannot due to his oath to Lester. They then use the new L.E.S.T.R. robot, whose original model is revealed to have recorded Randall and Lester's last conversation: Lester indirectly admitted that he killed Nicky to prevent the building from becoming a casino and asked Randall to take the severed finger to Oliver's apartment as a clue for the trio. Regaining their spirit, they continue to investigate with all the remaining residents' help. Together, they figure out that Nicky's sons and mother-in-law were hired to break into Charles's apartment and steal the finger.
50	10	"The House Always…"	Jamie Babbit	J. J. Philbin & Ben Smith	October 28, 2025	5DWB10
Learning from the Caccimelios that the finger belonged to Sofia's lover, the trio once again confronts the billionaires. They confirm that they have all of their fingers, including Jay who had faked missing one. Mabel concludes from a text message that the finger is Mayor Tillman's and he is Lester's killer. When an outraged Nicky attacked him for his affair with Sofia, the fight resulted in Lester accidentally killing Nicky and Tillman killed Lester afterward to protect his own reputation. Admitting to his crimes, Tillman has the trio locked in the casino room to perish while the Arconia is demolished. With Althea and Howard's help, the trio escapes and reveals during a press conference that they have recorded Tillman's confession. Jay, having a change of heart, publicly admits that he, Bash and Camila conspired with Tillman to retrieve his finger and cover up Nicky's murder. All four are arrested and the Arconia is saved. Three months later, Sofia and Lorraine have begun new lives from the money they inherited. The trio listens to the first episode of Cinda Canning's new podcast, only to later discover her dying at the Arconia's gates.

== Production ==
=== Development ===
In September 2024, during the airing of the fourth season, Hulu renewed the series for a fifth season.

=== Casting ===
In March 2025, Keegan-Michael Key, Christoph Waltz, and Renée Zellweger joined the cast in undisclosed roles for the season. In April 2025, Logan Lerman, Jermaine Fowler and Beanie Feldstein joined the cast. In August 2025, Dianne Wiest and Bobby Cannavale were announced to have been respectively cast as Lester's wife and a mobster.

=== Filming ===
Filming for the season took place between March and June 2025.

=== Music ===
The album for the fifth season was released on October 24, 2025.

Season five featured an original song entitled "Wish That You Were Me" written by David Archuleta, Sophie Rose and Michael Blum. The song was performed by the character Althea (a.k.a. "Thē") (Beanie Feldstein).

The score for the show was composed by Siddhartha Khosla.

Only Murders in the Building: Season 5 (Original Score)
No.	Title	Length
1.	"Dead Body Waltz"	1:39
2.	"Lester"	1:51
3.	"Nicky"	1:37
4.	"The House from The Godfather"	0:32
5.	"Billions"	1:59
6.	"The Mansion"	0:59
7.	"This Is How I Die"	0:58
8.	"Ey I'm Talkin' Here! Theme"	0:59
9.	"Lester Waltz"	1:40
10.	"Death Lies"	2:03
11.	"Good for You"	0:39
12.	"Crank"	1:02
13.	"Talking with Lester"	0:55
14.	"Part of Your Arm"	3:05
15.	"Back on Stage"	1:23
16.	"Hunt You Down"	0:39
17.	"Sad Purple Hovel"	0:58
18.	"A Good Guy"	0:31
19.	"A Quiet Kid"	1:12
20.	"The Future of the Arconia"	1:38
21.	"Ladies' Night"	2:07
22.	"Unburden Yourself"	2:06
23.	"Outside the Gates"	2:07
Total length:		32:00

== Release ==
The fifth season premiered on September 9, 2025, with three new episodes, on Hulu. Subsequent episodes released weekly until the season finale on October 28.

== Reception ==
=== Critical response ===
For the fifth season, the review aggregator website Rotten Tomatoes reported a 90% approval rating, based on 61 critic reviews. The website's critics consensus reads, "Putting the very fate of the Arconia on the line, Only Murders in the Building's fifth season goes back to the series' fundamentals — its core trio — and reaffirms that their charm hasn't waned one bit." Metacritic gave the fifth season a weighted average score of 71 out of 100 based on 16 critic reviews, indicating "generally favorable".

=== Accolades ===
The fifth season received 2 major nominations at the 78th Primetime Emmy Awards, for Outstanding Comedy Series and Martin Short for Outstanding Lead Actor in a Comedy Series.
