= Only Murders in the Building season 4 =

Season of television series

Only Murders in the Building
- Season 4
- Promotional poster
- Starring: Steve Martin; Martin Short; Selena Gomez; Michael Cyril Creighton
- No. of episodes: 10

Release
- Original network: Hulu
- Original release: August 27 – October 29, 2024

Season chronology
- ← Previous; Season 3 Next → Season 5

The fourth season of the American mystery comedy-drama television series Only Murders in the Building, often abbreviated as OMITB, premiered on August 27, 2024, on Hulu. The season stars Steve Martin, Martin Short, and Selena Gomez as a trio of friends producing true crime podcasts that investigate murder cases in their apartment building, along with Michael Cyril Creighton.

Paul Rudd and Meryl Streep return from the previous season as special guest stars, along with Zach Galifianakis, Eugene Levy, and Eva Longoria as fictionalized versions of themselves. In October 2023, Hulu greenlit Only Murders in the Building for a fourth season. Filming began in March 2024 in New York City and wrapped in June 2024. The season has ten episodes.

== Cast and characters ==
=== Main ===
- Steve Martin as Charles-Haden Savage
- Martin Short as Oliver Putnam
- Selena Gomez as Mabel Mora
- Michael Cyril Creighton as Howard Morris

=== Special guest ===
- Paul Rudd (Note: Credited as a special guest star during the opening credits in the season alongside the main cast in the episodes he appears in, except in the fourth episode.) as Glen Stubbins
- Meryl Streep (Note: Credited as a special guest star during the opening credits in the season alongside the main cast in the episodes she appears in.) as Loretta Durkin
- Zach Galifianakis (Note: Galifianakis, Levy, and Longoria, when they appear, are credited as special guest stars during the opening credits in the season alongside the main cast, except for in the first episode of the season.) as a fictionalized version of himself
- Eugene Levy as a fictionalized version of himself
- Eva Longoria as a fictionalized version of herself

=== Recurring ===
- Da'Vine Joy Randolph as Detective Donna Williams
- Jackie Hoffman as Uma Heller
- Teddy Coluca as Lester
- Jane Lynch as Sazz Pataki
- Molly Shannon as Bev Melon
- Catherine Cohen as Trina Brothers
- Jin Ha as Marshall P. Pope
- Siena Werber as Tawny Brothers
- Desmin Borges as Alfonso
- Richard Kind as Vince Fish
- Kumail Nanjiani as Rudy Thurber
- Daphne Rubin-Vega as Inez
- Lilian Rebelo as Ana

=== Guest ===
- Amy Ryan as Jan Bellows
- Scott Bakula as himself
- John McEnroe as himself
- Griffin Dunne as Milton Dudenoff
- Jason Kravits as Big Mike
- Melissa McCarthy as Doreen
- Alexandra Templer as Helga
- Ron Howard as himself
- Ryan Broussard as Will Putnam
- Jeremy Shamos as Dickie Glenroy
- Téa Leoni as Sofia Caccimelio

== Episodes ==
Episode titles in this season are named after real-life Hollywood films, with the exception of episode 9, which is named after an in-universe film.

No. overall	No. in season	Title	Directed by	Written by	Original release date	Prod. code
31	1	"Once Upon a Time in the West"	John Hoffman	John Hoffman & Joshua Allen Griffith	August 27, 2024	4DWB01
After finishing the podcast's latest season, the trio goes to Charles's apartment to celebrate, unaware of Sazz's murder as the body has already disappeared. The next morning, Charles texts Sazz and receives a reply that she had to fly to L.A. to double for Scott Bakula. The trio is approached by Bev Melon of Paramount Pictures with a proposal for a film adaptation of their podcast, and they fly to L.A. to discuss the deal. At a party thrown by the studio, they meet the actors who will play them: Eugene Levy, Zach Galifianakis, and Eva Longoria. Mabel is reluctant, but Eva advises to use the money for her life rights to build something on her own. Charles runs into Bakula, who says Sazz never showed up on set, and upon visiting her Hollywood apartment, the trio finds miscellaneous notes revolving around Charles. Returning to New York, they discover blood prints and a bullet hole in Charles's window before finding Sazz's ashes and prosthetic parts in the Arconia's incinerator, while the person texting in Sazz's name sends them an open threat.
32	2	"Gates of Heaven"	John Hoffman	Kristin Newman	September 3, 2024	4DWB02
Suspecting the shot that killed Sazz came from one of the apartments on the west side of the Arconia, Oliver and Mabel investigate some of its residents. They meet Vince Fish, a friendly eyepatch-wearing man, and a Hispanic family of three, Alfonzo, Inez, and Ana, who invite them to a card game called Oh hell and tell them about an always locked apartment belonging to someone only known as "Dudenoff". Mabel discovers that one of Sazz's notes contains the code numbers for the apartment's lockbox, so they break in and find a pig in the bathtub and a ham radio. Meanwhile, as Charles mourns Sazz, he is visited by Jan, who broke out of prison and tells him that Sazz was poking around the building recently, fearing that another murderer might be targeting Charles. Jan escapes before the police arrive for her, and Charles reports Sazz's murder to them. While they investigate the incinerator, the trio uses luminol to locate where Sazz's body fell. They find she wrote "Tap in" on the floor with her blood as an encouragement for Charles to solve the murder, while Oliver realizes the code numbers spell "Oh hell" upside down.
33	3	"Two for the Road"	Chris Koch	Ben Smith & Pete Swanson	September 10, 2024	4DWB03
With the FBI taking over Sazz's case, Detective Williams decides to help the trio's investigation, giving them information about the gun the sniper used. Concurrently, Eugene, Zach, and Eva arrive to study the trio's characteristics for the film. Spending the day with Oliver, Zach views him only as a narcissist until Howard tells him about Oliver's fighting spirit despite his failures, giving Zach a new perspective on the character's depth. Meanwhile, Mabel and Eva investigate Rudy Thurber, a Christmas-loving resident, after finding a piece of tinsel in Dudenoff's apartment. Under Eva's provocation, Rudy admits he actually hates Christmas, uses the theme only for his bodybuilder videos, and reveals that the piece they have found is not tinsel as it is non-flammable. Elsewhere, Charles and Eugene discover that Vince has a group photo of his neighbors, one of whom is holding a pig and has their face crossed out. Mabel decides to use squatter's rights to stay in Dudenoff's apartment and force them to come back. Later, the trio discovers a frequency on the ham radio and makes contact with someone who warns them to stop their investigation.
34	4	"The Stunt Man"	Chris Koch	Madeleine George	September 17, 2024	4DWB04
The trio learns that Sazz visited a bar for stunt performers on the night of her murder, so they go there to ask some questions. With the help of Glen Stubbins, Ben Glenroy's former stunt double, Charles meets the bar's chiropractor, Dr. Maggie, who tells him that Sazz was planning to retire from stunt working. Meanwhile, after attempting to evict Mabel from Dudenoff's apartment, the residents of the West Tower confess to her that they are illegal tenants as all the west apartments are rented by Professor Milton Dudenoff, who resides in Portugal, but lets them live in the Arconia for $200 a month. They also reveal the person who warned the trio on the ham radio was just Rudy's paranoid ex-girlfriend, Helga, and that none of them had ever met Sazz. Charles performs as Sazz's double so that her stunt double friends can hold a proper funeral for her, and remembers Sazz's dream of opening a training camp for stunt performers after her retirement. As the trio goes to the location Sazz wanted for the camp, they are surprised to find Bev there, who points a gun at them.
35	5	"Adaptation"	Jessica Yu	J. J. Philbin & Ella Robinson Brooks	September 24, 2024	4DWB05
Bev explains to the trio that she was trying to investigate Sazz's death because Sazz left her an unsettling voicemail about a problem with the film. Suspecting the killer is someone on the film, the trio interrogates screenwriter Marshall P. Pope, who is revealed to have been faking his appearance to look more like a credible writer. Marshall proves he has an alibi for the night of the murder and questions Charles's theory that the murder and the disposal of the crime scene could be done in 12 minutes. After Oliver fails to reenact the murder in that amount of time, Mabel discovers that, on the photos they took of the film crew, someone has the same shoeprint they saw in Dudenoff's apartment. On a photoshoot with the cast and crew, Eva helps the trio set a trap with tacky mats so that the shoeprints can be visible, while Charles realizes the murder is, in fact, feasible in 12 minutes if two people are involved. As the trio discovers that directors Tawny and Trina Brothers have the shoeprints they are searching for, the lights suddenly go out and a gun is fired.
36	6	"Blow-Up"	Jessica Yu	Rick Wiener & Kenny Schwartz	October 1, 2024	4DWB06
Zach and Glen are shot and hospitalized. Consequently, the trio deduces that Oliver was the intended target and that the killer is after the three of them. Detective Williams informs them that Dudenoff is not in Portugal, and they learn that he was the film professor of the Brothers sisters. Williams sends Sazz's remains to Charles, who discovers there are two left shoulder joints in the box, leading them to believe that there was another murder in the building, which Sazz could have found out. The trio confronts the Brothers sisters, who admit that they were in Dudenoff's apartment on the night of Sazz's murder, but only to visit him and to place hidden cameras in the building for behind-the-scenes footage of the film. They are shocked when Mabel reveals that, according to Williams's identification, the other shoulder joint was Dudenoff's. The trio later simultaneously receives "I'm watching you" text messages from Sazz's phone and footage of themselves from the last few days. Realizing the killer has been monitoring their every move, they leave the Arconia in fear to find a safe place. Note: The episode was filmed in found footage, showing all scenes as they were recorded by different types of cameras. The story is also split into a four-act narrative and presented in a mockumentary style by the Brothers sisters.
37	7	"Valley of the Dolls"	Shari Springer Berman & Robert Pulcini	Matteo Borghese & Rob Turbovsky	October 8, 2024	4DWB07
The trio hides on Long Island at the home of Doreen, Charles's sister. Bev and the actors visit them, much to the chagrin of Mabel, who wants to focus on the case. Loretta also visits and ends up in a brawl with Doreen due to the latter's crush on Oliver and her distress about her estrangement from Charles. While Doreen and Charles make amends, promising to visit each other more often, Loretta and Oliver talk about the future of their relationship, and Loretta accepts Oliver's marriage proposal. Wanting to help the investigation, the actors point out that the killer is possibly the mysterious person who left threatening letters in the Arconia throughout the podcast's first season and that the clues on Sazz's notes seem to confirm this theory. Later, Howard calls the trio and reports his discovery that the West Tower residents are individually cashing Social Security checks in Dudenoff's name.
38	8	"Lifeboat"	Shari Springer Berman & Robert Pulcini	Kristin Newman & Jake Schnesel	October 15, 2024	4DWB08
The West Tower residents arrange a meeting with the trio and the actors to clear their names in the murder investigation. They tell how they became friends with and received financial help from Dudenoff before he moved to Portugal a few years earlier. Doubting they are telling the truth, Mabel brings in Helga after identifying her on Vince's group photo as another of Dudenoff's friends. Helga tells how suspicious the others have become after the trio's podcast about murders in the Arconia began. They then show a video Dudenoff made that reveals the whole story: Dudenoff found out he was terminally ill, so he committed suicide, but asked his friends to hide his death from Helga and the authorities for the sake of all of their well-beings. Out of sympathy, Mabel decides to not use this information in their podcast, even if it leaves them without a lead. Helga informs them that Sazz contacted her during her investigation and mentioned that her former stunt double protégé turned out to be dangerous. The trio speculates that it was Glen, based on the movie he worked on with Sazz.
39	9	"Escape from Planet Klongo"	Jamie Babbit	Ben Smith & Alex Bigelow	October 22, 2024	4DWB09
The trio finds out that Glen replaced Sazz's protégé after the latter was fired from Project Ronkonkoma, the movie they worked on. Learning that Ron Howard directed that movie, the trio tries but fails to track him down on the set of his new film, Escape from Planet Klongo. Meanwhile, Glen is killed after the hospital contacts Sazz's phone about his condition, preventing Mabel from asking him any questions about the protégé. Charles and Oliver eventually meet Ron Howard at a restaurant as he turns out to be Oliver's old acquaintance. He reveals that Sazz's protégé was named Rex Bailey and shows them a photo of him. At the same time, Mabel discovers that the box of beers Sazz brought on the night of her murder contains the original script for the Only Murders in the Building movie with Sazz named as the writer. As Marshall arrives to discuss some changes in the script with Mabel, Charles and Oliver identify him as Rex Bailey and send this information to Mabel, only for Marshall to see the message.
40	10	"My Best Friend's Wedding"	Jamie Babbit	John Hoffman & J. J. Philbin	October 29, 2024	4DWB10
Realizing that Rex carried out the murder in 12 minutes by traversing the inner ledge of the building, Charles and Oliver do the same from Vince's window to save a captured Mabel, while Vince and Rudy help them distract Rex. Obtaining his gun, the trio forces him to reveal his motive for killing Sazz. He admits that he envied Sazz's talent after reading her script draft, so he stole and sold it to Paramount under a different name. When Sazz found out, she threatened to expose him, prompting Rex to use his hunter background and Sazz's investigative results to orchestrate her murder. He attempts to kill the trio as well, but they are saved when Jan shoots Rex dead from Charles's apartment, avenging Sazz. The police then arrest her again. A few days later, during Oliver's and Loretta's wedding, a woman named Sofia Caccimelio approaches Charles and Mabel to hire them to investigate her husband's disappearance. They turn her down despite Sofia's claim that her husband has a serious connection to the Arconia. The next day, the trio finds Lester, the doorman, dead in the Arconia's fountain.

== Production ==
=== Development ===
On October 3, 2023, the day the final episode of the third season was released, Hulu renewed Only Murders in the Building for a ten-episode fourth season. The season was announced with co-creators Steve Martin and John Hoffman serving as executive producers, along with stars Martin Short and Selena Gomez, and Dan Fogelman and Jess Rosenthal.

=== Casting ===
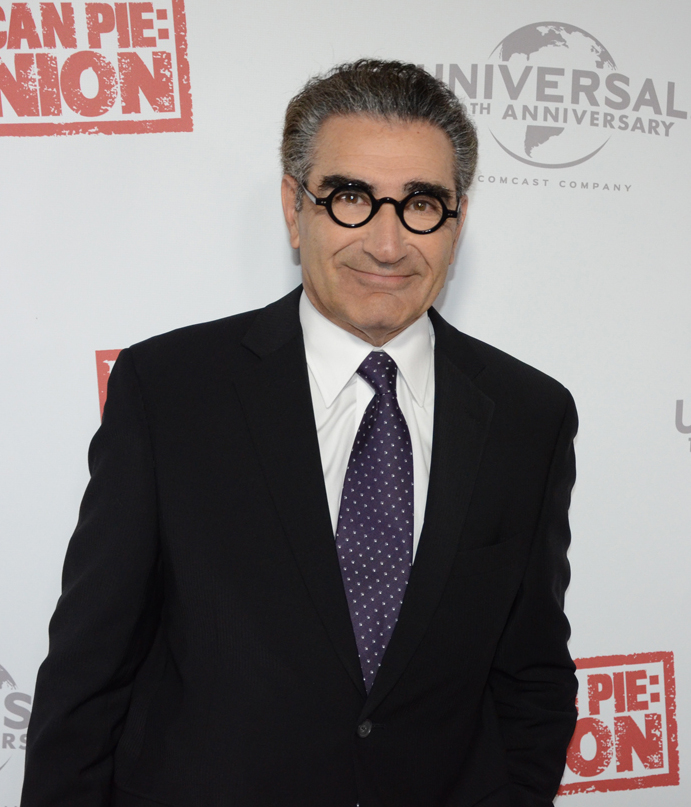
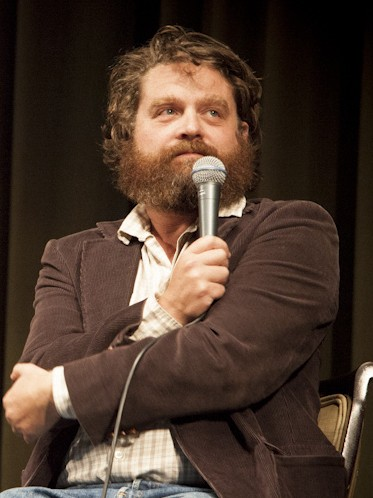
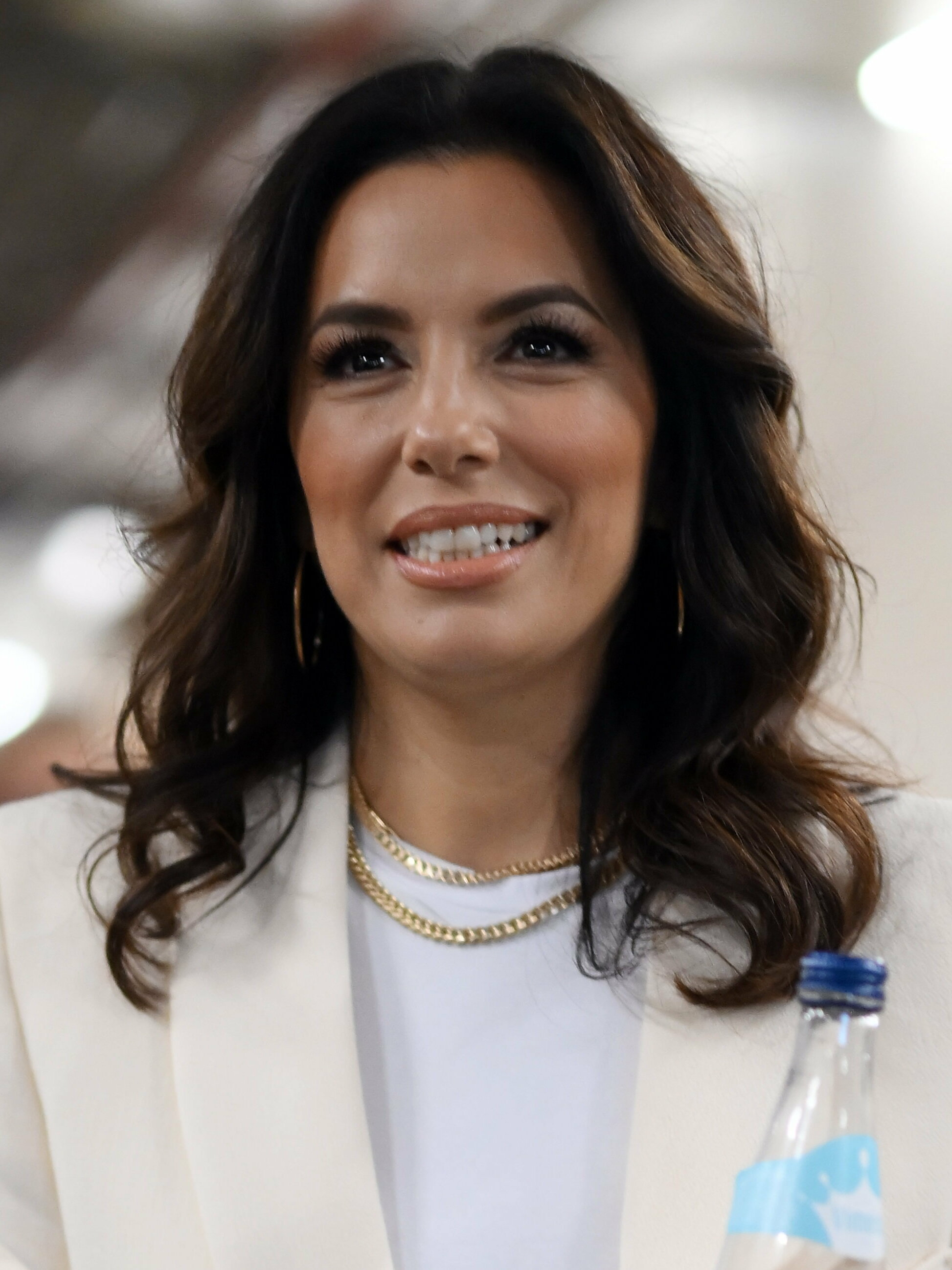
Eugene Levy, Zach Galifianakis and Eva Longoria joined the cast for the season as special guest stars, and portray fictionalized versions of themselves.

Martin, Short, Gomez, and Michael Cyril Creighton all return from the previous season, making this season the first to not add any new actors to the main cast. In February 2024, Molly Shannon, Eva Longoria, and Eugene Levy joined the cast in undisclosed recurring roles for the fourth season. Kumail Nanjiani and Zach Galifianakis were added in undisclosed recurring roles in March 2024. In April 2024, Desmin Borges, Siena Werber, Lilian Rebelo, Richard Kind, Daphne Rubin-Vega, Catherine Cohen, and Jin Ha joined the cast in recurring capacities. In May 2024, it was revealed that Melissa McCarthy joined the cast.

=== Writing ===
The episodes in the season were written by John Hoffman, Joshua Allen Griffith, Kristin Newman, Ben Smith, Pete Swanson, Madeleine George, J. J. Philbin, Ella Robinson Brooks, Rick Wiener, Kenny Schwartz, Matteo Borghese, Rob Turbovsky, Jake Schnesel, and Alex Bigelow.

=== Filming ===
Filming for the fourth season began in March 2024 in New York City, and concluded in June 2024.

=== Music ===
An album for the fourth season was released on October 25, 2024.

All music is composed by Siddhartha Khosla

No.	Title	Length
1.	"Rush to Sazz"	2:05
2.	"Super 8"	1:20
3.	"The Westies"	1:37
4.	"Cleaning Up Sazz"	1:08
5.	"Westies Suite"	3:02
6.	"Oh, Hell"	2:00
7.	"I Have a Plan"	1:35
8.	"What Sazz Would Have Wanted"	1:40
9.	"Absolute Savage"	2:18
10.	"38 Minutes"	1:00
11.	"Mirrors"	2:57
12.	"Sadd Pataki"	1:07
13.	"Brothers Sisters"	1:57
14.	"Cab Ride"	2:13
15.	"Prime Suspects"	1:46
16.	"The Meaning of Sazz"	1:21
17.	"I Do"	1:03
18.	"Out of Hand"	2:06
19.	"Backstories"	2:17
20.	"Dudenoff"	2:35
21.	"Become a Killer"	1:39
22.	"Do You Know What That Means?"	1:32
23.	"Oh, No!"	1:05
24.	"Emergency Contact"	1:01
25.	"What About Happy Endings"	1:29
26.	"The Fountain"	1:03
Total length:		45:00

== Release ==
The fourth season premiered on August 27, 2024, on Hulu. Subsequent episodes were released weekly until the season finale on October 29.

== Reception ==
=== Critical response ===
For the fourth season, the review aggregator website Rotten Tomatoes reported a 93% approval rating with an average rating of 7.8/10, based on 71 critic reviews. The website's critics consensus states, "The gang is back together in a more metatextual season full of famous faces, continuing Only Murders in the Building's reign as one of television's most delightful comedies." Metacritic gave the fourth season a weighted average score of 78 out of 100 based on 29 critic reviews, signifying "universal acclaim".

=== Accolades ===
The fourth season received 2 major nominations at the 77th Primetime Emmy Awards, for Outstanding Comedy Series and Martin Short for Outstanding Lead Actor in a Comedy Series.
