= Look for the Light (song) =

Song from Only Murders in the Building

Song by Meryl Streep and Ashley Park

from the album Only Murders in the Building: Season 3 (Original Soundtrack)
- Released: August 15, 2023
- Genre: Musical theatre
- Length: 2:31
- Label: Hollywood Records
- Songwriters: Pasek and Paul; Sara Bareilles

"Look for the Light" is a song from the third season of the Hulu comedy-drama television series Only Murders in the Building, performed by special-guest star Meryl Streep (as Loretta Durkin) and backing vocals by Ashley Park (as Kimber Min). The song was co-written by lyricists Benj Pasek and Justin Paul in collaboration with singer-songwriter Sara Bareilles.

== Development ==
John Robert Hoffman, the creator of Only Murders in the Building alongside lead actor Steve Martin, had previously hired Benj Pasek and Justin Paul to compose the songs for the third season of the show. Pasek and Paul signed on the condition that they would be able to work with Broadway songwriters, a proposal Hoffman approved of. Pasek and Paul decided to collaborate with Waitress lyricist and composer Sara Bareilles to write "Look for the Light". This collaboration was mutually desirable for the three songwriters. "Look for the Light" was composed specifically for Meryl Streep's voice, with the songwriters listening to her previous vocal performances to establish her vocal range. Streep was then shown the song over a video call on Zoom.

A counter-melody was developed later for Broadway actress and co-star Ashley Park, with both Park and Streep reportedly continuing to sing the melody so that the reactions of the cast could be captured in response to their actual in-show performance. Streep had felt intimidated by the melody of the song, with only two days for preparation before performing in front of a group of twenty people to new orchestration.

== In Only Murders in the Building ==
"Look for the Light" debuts in the third season episode "Grab Your Hankies". Oliver Putnam, portrayed by Martin Short, has written a Broadway musical theatre production called "Death Rattle Dazzle", an Agatha Christie-inspired murder-mystery. A detective, originally played by Paul Rudd's in-universe character Ben Glenroy, is contacted to try and solve the murder. By the time of the episode, the musical has mostly failed, due to the murder of Ben Glenroy. Putnam works through the night to try and convince the producers that the musical is worth funding. Donna and Cliff DeMeo, the lead producers of the production, portrayed by Linda Emond and Wesley Taylor respectively, inform Putnam that "Death Rattle Dazzle" needs a showstopper, giving him three days to complete this task or risk not receiving funding.

Putnam, with the support of love interest Loretta Durkin, portrayed by Meryl Streep, continue to work on a lullaby using Putnam's piano. The DeMeos return after three days to see if Putnam has a showstopper for his musical. Putnam requests Durkin to sing the lullaby, "Look for the Light", for everybody watching. Although she has not rehearsed, Durkin agrees to perform the song. With Kimber Min, portrayed by Ashley Park, providing a counter-melody, the pair perform "Look for the Light". Once the performance is finished, Putnam successfully convinces the DeMeos that "Death Rattle Dazzle" is worth funding.

"Look for the Light" is performed again in the tenth and final episode of the series, "Opening Night". This performance was filmed at the United Palace theatre in Washington Heights.

== Reception ==
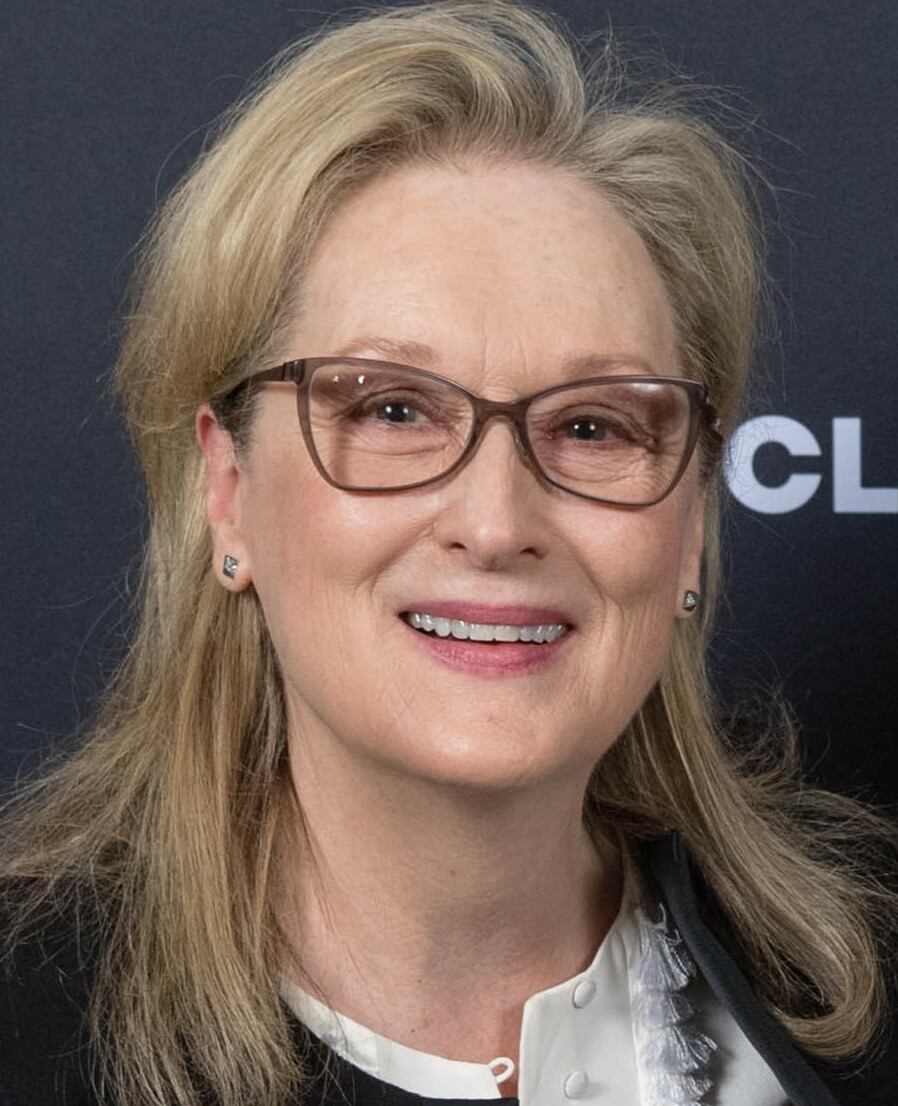
Critics praised Meryl Streep's acting and vocals in Only Murders in the Building

=== Critical reception ===
Following the debut of the song in the show, "Look for the Light" was released on all streaming platforms. Bobby Patrick, writing for BroadwayWorld, described Streep's singing, saying "her hushed, almost whispered, vocal production in the song gives it a dreamy, plaintive quality that calls the listener forward toward her." Commenting on Streep's chemistry with Short, Jo Elliott for The Indiependent described it as "brilliant" and praised the "beautifully written lyrics of songs like "Look for the Light" and "For The Sake of A Child"" (also performed by Streep alongside co-star Paul Rudd). Surprised by Streep's character and performance, The Daily Beast editor Kevin Fallon said "she's more of a spark plug than I expected, which makes the swoon-worthy beauty of her performance of "Look for the Light" that much more mesmerizing." Ashley Park was also praised for her accompaniment, with Bobby Patrick further adding that Park and Streep "share and blend so beautifully." That Shelf writer Ethan Dayton also praised the duet, referring to the combined vocals as "gorgeous" and that "it'll be in your music library as soon as you hear it."

=== Review aggregators ===
"Grab Your Hankies", the episode in which "Look for the Light" debuted, reported a 100% approval rating from 5 reviews on the review aggregator website Rotten Tomatoes. The critic consensus is complimentary, "Loretta proving her voice is invaluable."
