= Once Upon a Time in the West (disambiguation) =

Once Upon a Time in the West is a Western film starring Henry Fonda and Charles Bronson.

Once Upon a Time in the West may also refer to:

- Once Upon a Time in the West (soundtrack), the soundtrack to the film
- Once Upon a Time in the West (album), the second studio album by English indie rock band Hard-Fi
- "Once Upon a Time in the West", a Dire Straits song on the album Communiqué
- "Once Upon a Time in the West", an episode from season 4 of Only Murders in the Building
