= The Field Guide to the North American Teenager =

2019 novel by Ben Philippe

- Author: Ben Philippe
- Language: English
- Publisher: Balzer + Bray
- Publication date: January 8, 2019
- Pages: 384
- ISBN: 978-0-062-82411-0

The Field Guide to the North American Teenager is a young adult novel by Ben Philippe, published January 8, 2019 by Balzer + Bray.

== Reception ==
The Field Guide to the North American Teenager was well-received by critics, including starred reviews from School Library Journal, who called the novel "a witty debut with whip-smart dialogue."

Publishers Weekly wrote, "Philippe has a gift for dialogue and touches on a few instances of racism with sensitivity and humor in this crowd-pleaser."

Canadian Review of Materials noted, "Philippe takes his readers on an interesting and inspiring journey" that is also "entertaining and amusing."

Kirkus Reviews wrote, "Despite some missteps, this will appeal to readers who enjoy a fresh and realistic teen voice."

Shelf Awareness highlighted how "Philippe manages to make Norris [the main character] a humorous, sympathetic protagonist," despite the fact that he "should be wholly unlikable." They further discussed Phillipe's other fully-developed characters: "no one is only vapid, only smart, only mean, or only an athlete."

The novel received the following accolades:

- American Library Association Best Fiction for Young Adults Top Ten (2020)
- William C. Morris Debut YA Award (2020)
- YALSA Teens’ Top Ten Nominee (2020)
