= James Caverly =

American actor (born 1989)

- Born: June 16, 1989 (age 37); Royal Oak, Michigan
- Other name: Joey Caverly
- Education: Gallaudet University
- Years active: 2011–present

James "Joey" Caverly (born June 16, 1989) is an American actor who has been deaf since birth.

== Personal life ==
Caverly was born and raised in Royal Oak, Michigan. He has been deaf since birth and has an older sister who is also deaf, as well as two younger brothers who are hearing; his parents are hearing.

In 2007, Caverly graduated from Lahser High School, a mainstream school in the Bloomfield Hills School District with a program for deaf and hard of hearing students. In 2011, he received a Bachelor of Arts in Theatre Arts from Gallaudet University.

As of 2022, Caverly lives in New York City.

== Career ==
Soon after graduating from Gallaudet University in 2011, Caverly joined National Theatre of the Deaf, where he both directed and acted in plays for two years.

Following his time with National Theatre of the Deaf, Caverly performed with Huntington Theatre Company, Berkeley Repertory Theatre, Studio Theatre, Kitchen Theatre Company, and SpeakEasy Stage Company. In 2018, he performed in a Broadway production of Children Of A Lesser God with Studio 54.

Aside from acting, Caverly has also directed plays, including a 2017 production of Romeo and Juliet in both American Sign Language and spoken English for Community College of Baltimore County Community Theatre.

== Portrayals of deafness in media ==
Caverly has spoken publicly about the lack of accurate representation of deafness in film and television, as well as on stage. In 2022, he discussed how, in many media portrayals, the deaf person is "the problem, they're the issue in the story that needs to be fixed," which is not "the lens that the world needs to see."

Although he has experienced some barriers to his acting career due to his deafness, Caverly said in 2013, "As a deaf person I'm already invested in communicating through my body ... And when I'm on stage it's really easy for me to find that piece of emotion because I do it on a day to day basis."

=== Only Murders in the Building ===
Through Only Murders in the Building he had the opportunity to craft and artfully act as a complex deaf character. Caverly has previously indicated, "there are one too many creators who write disabled characters as two-dimensional: fixating on their disability without room for growth." Caverly worked with series co-creator John Hoffman and director Cherien Dabis "to figure out how to portray Theo authentically without feeling like a gimmick. Aside from the dialogue changes, [the trio] talked about how a deaf person views the world," making the character creation "a true collaborative effort between the creators and [Caverly] to bring the character to life."

In 2021, the series included an episode that had only one line of spoken dialogue and featured Caverly's character and ASL dialogues. When asked about the episode, Caverly said, "Framing the entire episode in the perspective of a Deaf person is a subversive act" because "[i]t forces the audience to listen closely, but with their eyes instead of ears." In crafting the episode, Caverly worked closely with director Cherien Dabis to more accurately represent his experiences as a deaf person, including camera angles. Additionally, the episode's screenwriters, Stephen Markley and Ben Philippe, shied away from making Caverly's character too "exceptional," indicating that people with disabilities, much like able-bodied people, are imperfect but not villainous.

In 2022, Caverly appeared in the second season of Only Murders in the Building and further highlighted the existing misrepresentation of deafness in media. Importantly, Caverly's and Selena Gomez's characters attempt to converse with each other, but Gomez's character does not know sign language. Caverly's character informs her that he can only catch about a third of what she says based on reading lips. This scene, in particular, is important because "Communication is something that, when Deaf people are present on-screen, usually isn’t perceived as a problem when it is."

After working on Only Murders in the Building, Caverly said that he is ready to explore more roles that do not fixate on the character's hearing loss, especially when the character's deafness does not elevate the plot. He asserts that "true inclusion would mean more disabled people in the writing room, behind the camera, and on the production team." Including disabled people in every step of the process would, he claims, help to "dismantle" the "tired portrayal of disabled characters on TV."

== Awards and honors ==
In 2022, the Only Murders in the Building episode "The Boy from 6B" was given the Seal of Authentic Representation from the Ruderman Family Foundation for Caverly's portrayal of Theo, as an actor with a disability and at least five lines of dialogue.

Also in 2022, Caverly was thought to be a possible contender for an Emmy Award nomination for his role on Only Murders in the Building, which would have made him the first deaf actor to be nominated; he did not receive a nomination.

Year	Award	Result
2010	World Deaf Cinema Festival Award for Best Student Mini-15 Short	Won
2014	Elliot Norton Award for Outstanding Production by a Midsize Theatre	Won
2014	Independent Reviewers of New England Award for Best Actor in a Play (Midsize)	Nominated
2014	Robert Prosky Award for Outstanding Lead Actor in a Play, HAYES Production	Nominated
2015	Theatre Bay Area Award of Outstanding Performance by the Ensemble of a Play	Won
2019	Syracuse Area Live Theatre Award for Leading Actor in a Play	Nominated
2023	Helen Hayes Award for Outstanding Lead Performer in a Musical	Won

== Filmography ==
Year	Title	Role	Note
2018–2019	Chicago Med	Peter Rush	2 episodes: "Be My Better Half"; "With a Brave Heart"
2020	A Bennett Song Holiday	Adam Song	
2021–2025	Only Murders in the Building	Theo Dimas	8 episodes: "Who Is Tim Kono?"; "How Well Do You Know Your Neighbors?"; "The Boy from 6B"; "Fan Fiction"; "Here's Looking at You"; "Flipping the Pieces"; ”CoBro”; "LESTR"

== Stage performances ==
Level	Title	Role	Company	Year
Broadway	Children of a Lesser God	Cast member	Studio 54	2018
Regional	Beertown	Nate Brunnel	Dog & Pony DC	2016
Regional	A Child's Christmas in Wales	Dylan Thomas	National Theatre of the Deaf	2012
Regional	I Was Most Alive With You	Shadow Interpreter	Huntington Theatre Company	2016
Regional	Journey of Identity	Laurent Clerc	National Theatre of the Deaf	2011
Regional	Squares	Ensemble	Dog & Pony DC	2015
Regional	Stories In My Pocket Too	Ensemble	National Theatre of the Deaf	2012
Regional	Tales of Honor & Anchovies	Innamorati	Faction of Fools	2013
Regional	Tribes	Billy	Berkeley Repertory Theatre	2014
Regional	Tribes	Billy	Kitchen Theatre Company	2019
Regional	Tribes	Billy	SpeakEasy Stage Company	2013
Regional	Tribes	Billy	Studio Theatre	2014
Regional	W-5s: Stories Behind	Ensemble	National Theatre of the Deaf	2012
Regional	The Music Man	Harold Hill	Olney Theater Center	2022
