= Allison Guinn =

21st century actress

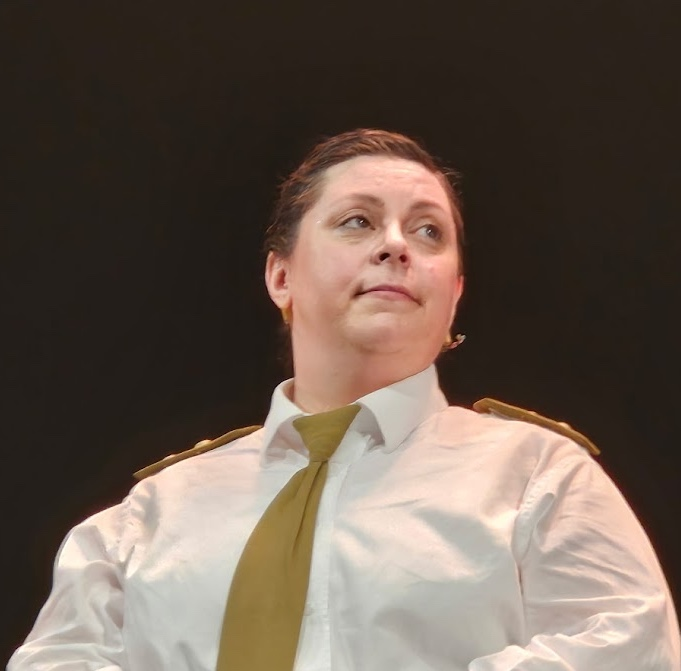
- Guinn in Operation Mincemeat, 2026
- Occupation: Actor
- Years active: 2008-present

Allison Guinn is an American television and stage actress. In 2024, she was nominated for a SAG Award for her ensemble work in Only Murders In The Building.

== Early life and education ==
Guinn grew up in Erwin, Tennessee, where she attended Unicoi County High School. She graduated from East Tennessee State University in 2004 with a degree in Communications and attended Circle in the Square Theatre School. There, she received the Bud Frank Award for Excellence in Theatre.

== Theatre credits ==
Year	Production	Role	Category	Ref
2008	Hair	Tribe	The Public Theater, Shakespeare in the Park	
2009	Hair	Tribe, Buddahdalirama u/s	Broadway, Al Hirschfeld Theatre	
2010	Hair	Tribe	West End, Gielgud Theatre	
2011	Hair	Buddhadalirama/Mother/Tribe, Jeanie u/s	Broadway, St. James Theatre, return engagement	
2012	Noises Off	Poppy Norton-Taylor	Texas, Alley Theatre	
2013	On The Town	Lucy Schmeeler	Massachusetts, Barrington Stage Company	
2014	On The Town	Lucy Schmeeler, Madame Dilly u/s, Hildy u/s	Broadway, Lyric Theatre	
2016	The Legacy of Daisy Dean	Performer	Concert, 54 Below	
2016	A Taste of Things to Come	Dottie	Off-Broadway	
2017	Les Misérables	Madame Thenardier	National Tour	
2023	The Sore Loser		Off-Broadway, MCC Theater	
2024	Tammy Faye	Jan Crouch	Broadway, Palace Theatre	
2025	Dear Everything	Ensemble	Concert, Terminal 5	
2025	Huzzah!	Lady Eve	San Diego, Old Globe Theatre	
2026	Operation Mincemeat	Johnny Bevan & Others u/s	Broadway, John Golden Theatre	
2027	Paddington: The Musical	Lady Sloane/ Mrs. Hachoo/ Train Announcer	Broadway, Al Hirschfeld Theatre	

== Television credits ==
Year	Show	Role	Ref
2022	Gay History Tour	Actor	
2023	The Marvelous Mrs. Maisel	Bunny	
2023	Only Murders In The Building	KT Knoblauer (5 episodes)	
