= Madeleine George =

American playwright and author

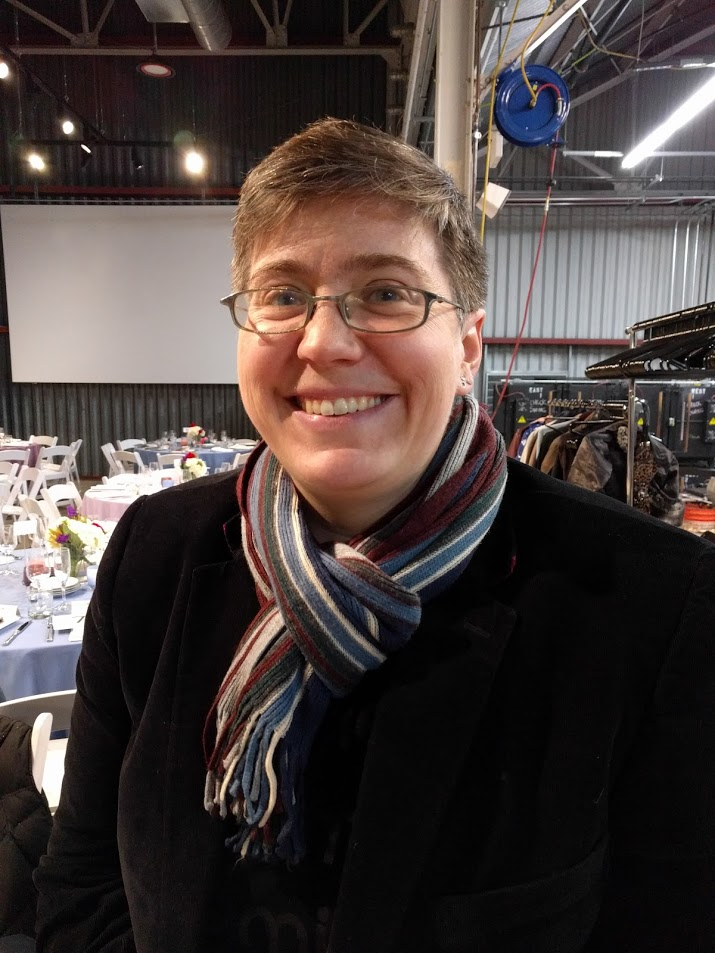
- Education: Cornell University (BA); New York University (MFA)
- Occupation: Playwright
- Employer(s): Bard Prison Initiative; writer and executive story editor for Only Murders in the Building
- Notable work: The (Curious Case of the) Watson Intelligence
- Spouse: Lisa Kron
- Awards: Whiting Award for Drama; Pulitzer Prize for Drama finalist
- Website: www.madeleinegeorge.com

Madeleine George is an American playwright and author. Her play The (Curious Case of the) Watson Intelligence was a finalist for the Pulitzer Prize for Drama in 2014 and she won the 2016 Whiting Award for Drama.

George works as a writer and executive story editor on the Hulu comedy series Only Murders in the Building.

== Early life ==
George grew up in Amherst, Massachusetts, and attended Amherst Regional High School. She began writing plays as a student, and participated in the Young Playwrights Festival at Playwrights Horizons and The Public Theater when she was a teenager. The New York Times critic Ben Brantley called her play Sweetbitter Baby, written when George was 17, "a portrait of a romance going sour in the course of a night...it...leaves its affecting residue of a sense of unbridgeable isolation."

George holds a B.A., Phi Beta Kappa, summa cum laude, from Cornell University, from which she graduated in 1996, and an M.F.A. from NYU's Tisch School of the Arts.

== Career ==
=== Theater ===
In 2003, George became a founding member of 13P (Thirteen Playwrights, Inc.), an Obie-Award-winning collective, along with playwrights such as Anne Washburn, Sarah Ruhl, and Young Jean Lee.

Precious Little, a drama about a linguist who learns that due to a genetic abnormality, the child she is carrying may never learn to speak, was produced in New York by Clubbed Thumb as part of its Summerworks series in 2009. It has subsequently been produced by the Rivendell Theatre Ensemble in Chicago, City Theatre in Pittsburgh, Shotgun Players in Berkeley, and many other theaters. The Nora Theatre Company at Central Square Theatre in Cambridge, Massachusetts, produced the play in 2017.

George's dark comedy The Zero Hour was presented by 13P at Walkerspace in New York in 2010, and was a finalist for the Lambda Literary Award for Drama. Seven Homeless Mammoths Wander New England, "a screwball sex comedy about the perils of monogamy, certainty, and academic administration", was originally produced by New Jersey's Two River Theater in 2011 and named the Best Play of 2011 by the New Jersey Star-Ledger.

The (Curious Case of the) Watson Intelligence was produced by Playwrights Horizons in 2013, and subsequently won an Outer Critics Circle Award. George was inspired to write the play after watching an episode of Jeopardy! featuring the supercomputer Watson. In naming it a finalist for the Pulitzer Prize for Drama, the committee praised it as "a cleverly constructed play that uses several historical moments—from the 1800s to the 2010s—to meditate on the technological advancements that bring people together and tear them apart."

George won the 2016 Whiting Award for Drama. The selection committee called her "a playwright at home in the messiness of us. She writes rigorously about love and its great sacrifices, and we are pulled to her scenes and words because she will not compromise how complicated we truly are. Conceptually rich and perfectly paced, every particle of language—from a character's speech to a stage direction—contributes to the vivid construction of a world."

George's play Hurricane Diane, which "combines suburban New Jersey housewives, gardening, climate change, and Greek tragedy", premiered at the Two River Theater in 2017. In 2016, George began a three-year term as the Playwright in Residence at Two River, through the National Playwright Residency Program, funded by the Andrew W. Mellon Foundation and administered by HowlRound.

Hurricane Diane opened off-Broadway at the New York Theatre Workshop in 2019, in a production directed by Leigh Silverman.

=== Books ===
George is the author of two young-adult novels, Looks (2008) and The Difference Between You and Me (2012), both published by Viking Press. Publishers Weekly called The Difference Between You and Me "a frank and funny account of opposites attracting [that] provides remarkable insight into teenage romance." It was a Kirkus Best Teen Book of 2012, a selection of the Junior Library Guild, and an ALA Rainbow List selection.

=== Television ===
George works as a writer and executive story editor on the Hulu comedy series Only Murders in the Building.

=== Bard Prison Initiative ===
George is a Fellow for Curriculum and Program Development at the Bard Prison Initiative at Bard College. She was site director of the Bard Prison Initiative campus at Bayview Correctional Facility in Manhattan from 2006 until it closed in 2012 after Hurricane Sandy.

== Personal life ==
George is married to the playwright Lisa Kron.
