= Ben Philippe =

Haitian-Canadian author and screenwriter

- Born: Haiti
- Education: Columbia University (BA)
- Occupations: novelist, screenwriter
- Writing career
- Notable work: The Field Guide to the North American Teenager
- Notable awards: William C. Morris Award (2020)

Ben Philippe is a Haitian-Canadian author and screenwriter.

== Biography ==
Philippe was born in Haiti and raised in Montreal. Philippe received his B.A. from Columbia University in 2011 and received his MFA from the Michener Center for Writers in Austin, Texas. He is currently based in New York City and is an assistant professor at Barnard College.

His debut novel, The Field Guide to the North American Teenager, was named one of ALA Best Fiction for Young Adults in 2020. He won the 2020 William C. Morris Award for his work on the novel.

In 2020, Philippe published a novel, Charming As A Verb, followed by a memoir, Sure, I'll Be Your Black Friend in 2021, which was named one of Canada's best nonfiction books by CBC.

In January 2022, Philippe was nominated for the Writers Guild of America Award for Television: New Series and Writers Guild of America Award for Television: Comedy Series for his work on Only Murders in the Building.

== Bibliography ==
=== The Field Guide to the North American Teenager ===
Published January 8, 2019, Philippe's first novel The Field Guide to the North American Teenager follows Norris Kaplan a witty black French Canadian who moves to Texas, where he is dropped into a new and very American high school.

=== Charming as a Verb ===
Originally published on September 8, 2020, Charming as a Verb is Philippe's second novel. Henri 'Halti' Haltiwanger is a charming and popular student at FATE Academy. His high ambitions take him down an unexpected path of self discovery.

=== Sure, I'll Be Your Black Friend ===
Composed of essays, Philippe's Sure, I'll Be Your Black Friend is a candid exploration of what it means to be "on the other side of the fist bump." A conversational take on matters regarding upbringing, race and relationships.
