= Ryan Broussard =

American actor and baseball player

- Born: September 14, 1989 (age 37); Breaux Bridge, Louisiana
- Education: LSU Eunice; UL Lafayette; Brown University
- Occupation: Actor
- Years active: 2014–present

Ryan Broussard (born September 14, 1989) is an American actor and former Minor League Baseball player. He is known for playing Will Putnam in the Hulu mystery comedy-drama series Only Murders in the Building and Mike Sherman in the Fox police procedural crime series Alert: Missing Persons Unit.

== Early life and education ==
Broussard was born on September 14, 1989, in Breaux Bridge, Louisiana. He attended Louisiana State University at Eunice, where he played college baseball. In 2010, he was drafted by the Los Angeles Angels. He played with the team for two years as a shortstop before returning to Louisiana to study theatre at the University of Louisiana at Lafayette. Broussard received an MFA in acting from Brown University in 2019. As of 2022, he lives in Brooklyn.

== Filmography ==
Year	Title	Role	Notes
2021–present	Only Murders in the Building	Will Putnam	
2022	Sistas	Jake	
2023–2025	Alert: Missing Persons Unit	Mike Sherman	Main role
2025-	Boston Blue	Detective Brian Rodgers	Recurring role
2026	Law & Order	Sean Chase	Episode: "Dreams On"
