= Only Murders in the Building =

American television series (2021–present)

- Also known as: Only Murders in London (season 6)
- Genre: Comedy drama; Mystery
- Created by: Steve Martin & John Hoffman
- Showrunner: John Hoffman
- Starring: Steve Martin; Martin Short; Selena Gomez; Aaron Dominguez; Amy Ryan; Cara Delevingne; Adina Verson; Michael Cyril Creighton
- Music by: Siddhartha Khosla; Benj Pasek & Justin Paul (season 3)
- Country of origin: United States
- Original language: English
- No. of seasons: 5
- No. of episodes: 50

Production
- Executive producers: Dan Fogelman; Jess Rosenthal; Jamie Babbit; Steve Martin; Martin Short; Selena Gomez; John Hoffman; Ben Smith; J.J. Philbin
- Producer: Kristin Bernstein
- Cinematography: Chris Teague; Dagmar Weaver-Madsen; Kyle Wullschleger
- Editors: Julie Monroe; JoAnne Yarrow; Matthew Barbato; David L. Bertman; Shelly Westerman; Peggy Tachdjian; Payton Koch; Thomas Kipley; Diana Cruz Hiatt
- Running time: 26–40 minutes
- Production companies: Rhode Island Ave. Productions; Another Hoffman Story Productions; 40 Share Productions; 20th Television

Original release
- Network: Hulu
- Release: August 31, 2021 – present

Only Murders in the Building is an American mystery comedy-drama television series created by Steve Martin and John Hoffman. The show focuses on a trio of strangers (played by Steve Martin, Martin Short, and Selena Gomez) with a shared interest in true crime podcasts, who become friends while investigating a succession of murders in the Arconia, their upscale apartment building on Manhattan's Upper West Side, and producing their own podcast about the cases, titled Only Murders in the Building. Its five seasons premiered on Hulu in August 2021, June 2022, August 2023, August 2024, and September 2025. In October 2025, the series was renewed for a sixth season, branded as Only Murders in London, which is slated to premiere on December 8, 2026.

The series has received critical acclaim since its debut, with reviewers highlighting its comedic approach to crime fiction as well as the cast performances. It has received nominations for the Primetime Emmy Award for Outstanding Comedy Series and Golden Globe Award for Best Television Series – Musical or Comedy. For their performances, Martin, Short, and Gomez have gained acting nominations at the Primetime Emmy Awards and Golden Globe Awards, and the cast of the fourth season received the Screen Actors Guild Award for Outstanding Performance by an Ensemble in a Comedy Series.

== Cast and characters ==
=== Main ===
- Steve Martin as Charles-Haden Savage, a misanthropic semi-retired actor who was the star of the popular 1990s crime drama series Brazzos and, as a result of the podcast's success, goes on to star in its 2020s revival
  - Matthew Lamb as young Charles (season 2)
- Martin Short as Oliver Putnam, an ambitious but financially struggling Broadway director who spawns the idea of the podcast and becomes its director
  - Samuel Farnsworth (season 2) and Hayes McCracken (season 5) as young Oliver
- Selena Gomez as Mabel Mora, a young artist and apartment renovator living alone in her aunt's unit, who was part of a quartet called "The Hardy Boys", that solved pretend mysteries throughout her childhood and teenage years, which included her best friend Tim Kono, the first season's murder victim
  - Madeleine Valencia (season 1), Caroline Valencia (season 2), and Isabella Aparicio (season 5) as young Mabel
- Aaron Dominguez as Oscar Torres (season 1), a friend of Mabel and Tim who was wrongfully convicted of the murder of their friend Zoe Cassidy ten years earlier, has recently been released from prison, and dates Mabel for a while
- Amy Ryan as Jan Bellows (season 1; recurring season 2; guest season 4), a professional bassoonist who begins dating Charles.
- Cara Delevingne as Alice Banks (season 2), an artist and briefly Mabel's love interest.
- Adina Verson as Poppy White (season 2; guest season 1), (Note: Verson is credited as starring for the final episode of season 2, after being credited as recurring in all her previous appearances.) Cinda Canning's ambitious but abused assistant. She later reveals her true identity as Becky Butler, the subject of the All Is Not OK in Oklahoma crime podcast
- Michael Cyril Creighton as Howard Morris (season 3–present; recurring seasons 1–2), a cat-loving resident of the Arconia whose cat died the same night as Tim Kono. He becomes Oliver's assistant in season 3 for his play and becomes more invested in helping with the podcast during season 4.

=== Special guest ===
- Paul Rudd (Note: Rudd is credited as special guest star during the opening credits in season 3 and 4 alongside the main cast. He is uncredited in season 5, except for episode 10.) as:
  - Ben Glenroy (season 3; guest season 2), a Hollywood actor best known for playing television superhero CoBro, who is murdered on the opening night of his first Broadway play.
  - Glen Stubbins (season 4), Ben Glenroy's Irish-born former stunt double.
  - the voice of L.E.S.T.R. (season 5), the new robot-doorman of the Arconia, named after the previous human doorman Lester Coluca.
- Meryl Streep as Loretta Durkin (season 3–present), (Note: Streep is credited as special guest star during the opening credits since season 3 alongside the main cast.) a struggling actress and Oliver's love interest, and later wife, who stars in his Broadway play, and later its musical reinterpretation.
- Zach Galifianakis (season 4) (Note: Galifianakis, Levy, and Longoria, when they appear, are credited as special guest stars during the opening credits in season 4 alongside the main cast.) as a fictionalized version of himself, portraying Oliver in the film adaptation of the podcast.
- Eugene Levy (season 4) as a fictionalized version of himself, portraying Charles in the film adaptation of the podcast.
- Eva Longoria (season 4) as a fictionalized version of herself, portraying Mabel in the film adaptation of the podcast.

=== Recurring ===
- Julian Cihi as Tim Kono (season 1; guest season 5), a resident of the Arconia who dies in the first episode. The mysterious circumstances surrounding his death spur Charles, Oliver, and Mabel to do their own investigation.
- Da'Vine Joy Randolph as Detective Donna Williams, an NYPD detective who ends up becoming involved with each of the mysteries. She is introduced when she initially closes the Kono murder case but becomes interested again after her wife starts listening to the podcast.
- Tina Fey as Cinda Canning (seasons 1–2; guest seasons 3, 5), the host of the true crime podcast All Is Not OK in Oklahoma, a parody of Sarah Koenig and her true crime podcast Serial.
- Jackie Hoffman as Uma Heller, an ornery Arconia resident
- Jayne Houdyshell as Bunny Folger (seasons 1–2; guest seasons 3, 5), the iron-fisted board president of the Arconia whose murder is investigated in the second season.
  - Houdyshell also voices Mrs. Gambolini (season 2), Bunny's pet parrot
- Nathan Lane as Theodore "Teddy" Dimas, Sr. (seasons 1–2, 5), an old friend and patron of Oliver's family, who has ties to the local Greek mafia and agrees to sponsor the podcast.
- James Caverly as Theodore "Theo" Dimas, Jr. (season 1; guest seasons 2–3, 5), Teddy's deaf son.
- Ryan Broussard as Will Putnam (seasons 1–2; guest seasons 3–4), Oliver's son
- Teddy Coluca as Lester Coluca (seasons 1–2, 4–5; guest season 3), the Arconia's doorman, whose murder is investigated in season 5
  - Emory Cohen as young Lester (guest season 5)
- Vanessa Aspillaga as Ursula (seasons 1–2, 5), the Arconia's building manager
- Russell G. Jones as Dr. Grover Stanley (seasons 1–2, 5), a therapist who lives at the Arconia.
- Jaboukie Young-White as Sam, Daniel Oreskes as Marv, Ali Stroker as Paulette, and Orson Hong as Grant (seasons 1–2), enthusiastic fans of the Only Murders in the Building podcast.
- Zainab Jah as Ndidi Idoko (season 1), Tim Kono's next-door neighbor
- Maulik Pancholy as Arnav Kapoor (season 1), Charles's next-door neighbor
- Olivia Reis as Zoe Cassidy (season 1), a friend of Mabel, Tim, and Oscar who died ten years earlier after falling from the roof of the Arconia.
- Zoe Colletti as Lucy (season 2), the teenage daughter of Charles's ex-girlfriend, with whom Charles has a tenuous father–daughter relationship.
- Michael Rapaport as Detective Daniel Kreps (season 2), a police detective investigating Bunny's murder
- Christine Ko as Nina Lin (season 2), Bunny's protégée and the Arconia's new board president
- Ariel Shafir as Ivan (season 2), a server at Bunny's regular diner
- Andrea Martin as Joy Payne (season 3; guest season 2), Charles's longtime makeup artist and love interest
- Jason Veasey as Jonathan Bridgecroft (season 3; guest season 2), Howard's neighbor and love interest, and an actor in Oliver's show
- Linda Emond as Donna DeMeo (season 3), a Broadway producer who funds Oliver's return to Broadway
- Ashley Park as Kimber Min (season 3), a young actress and influencer who plays Ben's love interest in Oliver's show
- Jeremy Shamos as Dickie Glenroy (season 3; guest season 4), Ben's adopted brother and manager
- Wesley Taylor as Clifford "Cliff" DeMeo (season 3), Donna's clingy son who co-produces Oliver's play
- Jesse Williams as Tobert (season 3), a camera operator hired by Ben to make a documentary about his Broadway debut and briefly Mabel's love interest
- Don Darryl Rivera as Bobo Malone (season 3), an actor in Oliver's show
- Gerald Caesar as Ty Wessex (season 3), an actor in Oliver's show
- Allison Guinn as K. T. Knoblauer (season 3), the stage manager for Oliver's show
- Jane Lynch as Sazz Pataki (season 4; guest seasons 1–3, 5), Charles's stunt double, who dates everyone he dates after him, and whose popularity with their coworkers often surpasses his. She is shot dead by an unknown assailant at the end of the third season with a snipe ostensibly meant for Charles.
- Molly Shannon as Bev Melon (season 4), a producer at Paramount Studios, intending to make a film adaptation from the podcast
- Catherine Cohen as Trina Brothers (season 4), Tawny's twin sister and the co-director of the film adaptation of the podcast
- Jin Ha as Marshall P. Pope/Rex Bailey (season 4), the screenwriter of the film adaptation of the podcast
- Siena Werber as Tawny Brothers (season 4), Trina's twin sister and the co-director of the film adaptation of the podcast
- Desmin Borges as Alfonso (season 4), the patriarch of a family living in the Arconia's west tower
- Richard Kind as Vince Fish (season 4–present), a resident of the west tower who wears an eye patch as a result of perpetual pink eye
- Kumail Nanjiani as Rudy Thurber (season 4), a fitness influencer and resident of the west tower who decorates his apartment with Christmas decorations year-round as a result of a Christmas-centric video becoming a hit
- Daphne Rubin-Vega as Inez (season 4), Alfonso's wife
- Lilian Rebelo as Ana (season 4), Alfonso and Inez's daughter
- Téa Leoni as Sofia Caccimelio (season 5; guest season 4), a woman who seeks to hire Charles and Mabel to investigate her husband's disappearance
- Bobby Cannavale as Nicky Caccimelio (season 5), Sofia's husband, an infamous mobster who disappeared from the public
- Dane DiLiegro as Johnny Caccimelio (season 5), Sofia and Nicky's eldest son
- Dianne Wiest as Lorraine Coluca (season 5), Lester's wife
- Jermaine Fowler as Randall (season 5), Lester's protégée and the Arconia's new doorman
- Keegan-Michael Key as Mayor Beau Tillman (season 5), New York's current mayor
- Beanie Feldstein as Althea (or "Thē") (season 5), a famous pop singer and Mabel's former childhood friend
- Logan Lerman as Jay Pflug (season 5), a billionaire whose fortune comes from his family's pharmaceutical company
- Christoph Waltz as Bash Steed (season 5), a billionaire who made his fortune in artificial intelligence and is implied to be much older than he appears
- Renée Zellweger as Camila White (season 5), a billionaire whose fortune comes from hotels and lifestyle businesses
- David Patrick Kelly as Miller (season 5), the trash collector at the Arconia

=== Guest ===
- Adriane Lenox (seasons 1, 5) and Marie-Francoise Theodore (season 2) as Roberta Putnam, Oliver's ex-wife
- Sting as a fictionalized version of himself (season 1), an Arconia resident who was at odds with Tim Kono
- Roy Wood Jr. as Vaughn and Jacob Ming-Trent as Lucian (season 1), hosts of a horticulture podcast who give Charles and Oliver a ride
- Jimmy Fallon as himself (season 1)
- Mandy Gonzalez as Silvia Mora (season 1), Mabel's mother
- Amy Schumer as a fictionalized version of herself (season 2), who moves into Sting's former apartment and proposes a TV series to Oliver based on their podcast
- Shirley MacLaine as Rose Cooper (season 2), Charles's father's lover and painter pretending to be Bunny's mother, Leonora Folger
- Mark Consuelos as Mabel's late father (season 2)
- Noma Dumezweni as Maxine Spear (season 3), a theater critic
- Adrian Martinez as Gregg Rivera (season 3), an obsessed fan of Ben's
- Peter Bartlett as Jerry Blau (season 3), a washed-up Broadway director and an old colleague of Oliver's
- Matthew Broderick as a fictionalized version of himself (season 3), who is briefly cast in Oliver's show as Charles's replacement
- Mel Brooks as himself (season 3)
- Scott Bakula as himself (season 4)
- John McEnroe as himself (season 4)
- Griffin Dunne as Professor Milton Dudenoff (season 4)
- Melissa McCarthy as Doreen (season 4), Charles's sister who lives on Long Island
- Jason Kravits as Big Mike (season 4), Doreen's husband
- Ron Howard as himself (season 4)
- Tony Plana as George (season 5), a former doorman of the Arconia who trained Lester
- Siobhan Fallon Hogan as Mrs. Morris (season 5), Howard's late mother and a resident of the Arconia
- Dylan Baker as Ron (season 5), a farmer whom Oliver encounters
- Becky Ann Baker as Linda (season 5), a farmer whom Oliver encounters
- Jennifer Saunders (season 6)
- Martin Freeman (season 6)
- Simone Ashley (season 6)
- Sean Teale (season 6)
- Amar Chadha-Patel (season 6)
- Rhea Norwood (season 6)
- Lesley Nicol (season 6)
- Jane Horrocks (season 6)
- Matthew Beard (season 6)
- Sharon Horgan (season 6)
- Geri Halliwell (season 6)
- Jamie Demetriou (season 6)
- Anjana Vasan (season 6)
- Derek Jacobi (season 6)
- David Tennant (season 6)
- Nicola Coughlan (season 6)
- Jodie Whittaker (season 6)
- Jim Broadbent (season 6)
- Richard Ayoade (season 6)
- Adrian Lukis (season 6)
- Kathryn Hunter (season 6)
- Olivia Colman (season 6)
- Peter Capaldi (season 6)

== Episodes ==
Season	Episodes	Originally released	
Season	Episodes	First released	Last released
1	10	August 31, 2021	October 19, 2021
2	10	June 28, 2022	August 23, 2022
3	10	August 8, 2023	October 3, 2023
4	10	August 27, 2024	October 29, 2024
5	10	September 9, 2025	October 28, 2025
6	10	December 8, 2026	January 26, 2027

=== Season 1 (2021) ===
No. overall	No. in season	Title	Directed by	Written by	Original release date	Prod. code
1	1	"True Crime"	Jamie Babbit	Steve Martin & John Hoffman	August 31, 2021	1DWB01
2	2	"Who Is Tim Kono?"	Jamie Babbit	Kirker Butler	August 31, 2021	1DWB02
3	3	"How Well Do You Know Your Neighbors?"	Gillian Robespierre	Ben Smith	August 31, 2021	1DWB03
4	4	"The Sting"	Gillian Robespierre	Kristin Newman	September 7, 2021	1DWB04
5	5	"Twist"	Don Scardino	Thembi L. Banks	September 14, 2021	1DWB05
6	6	"To Protect and Serve"	Don Scardino	Madeleine George & Kim Rosenstock	September 21, 2021	1DWB06
7	7	"The Boy from 6B"	Cherien Dabis	Stephen Markley & Ben Philippe	September 28, 2021	1DWB07
8	8	"Fan Fiction"	Cherien Dabis	Matteo Borghese & Rob Turbovsky	October 5, 2021	1DWB08
9	9	"Double Time"	Jamie Babbit	John Hoffman & Kristin Newman	October 12, 2021	1DWB09
10	10	"Open and Shut"	Jamie Babbit	John Hoffman & Rachel Burger	October 19, 2021	1DWB10

=== Season 2 (2022) ===
No. overall	No. in season	Title	Directed by	Written by	Original release date	Prod. code
11	1	"Persons of Interest"	John Hoffman	John Hoffman & Noah Levine	June 28, 2022	2DWB01
12	2	"Framed"	John Hoffman	Kristin Newman	June 28, 2022	2DWB02
13	3	"The Last Day of Bunny Folger"	Jude Weng	Ben Smith	July 5, 2022	2DWB03
14	4	"Here's Looking at You"	Jude Weng	Valentina Garza & Rachel Burger	July 12, 2022	2DWB04
15	5	"The Tell"	Cherien Dabis	Matteo Borghese & Rob Turbovsky	July 19, 2022	2DWB05
16	6	"Performance Review"	Cherien Dabis	Ben Smith & Joshua Allen Griffith	July 26, 2022	2DWB06
17	7	"Flipping the Pieces"	Chris Teague	Stephen Markley & Ben Philippe	August 2, 2022	2DWB07
18	8	"Hello, Darkness"	Chris Teague	Madeleine George	August 9, 2022	2DWB08
19	9	"Sparring Partners"	Jamie Babbit	Kirker Butler	August 16, 2022	2DWB09
20	10	"I Know Who Did It"	Jamie Babbit	John Hoffman, Matteo Borghese & Rob Turbovsky	August 23, 2022	2DWB10

=== Season 3 (2023) ===
No. overall	No. in season	Title	Directed by	Written by	Original release date	Prod. code
21	1	"The Show Must…"	John Hoffman	John Hoffman & Sas Goldberg	August 8, 2023	3DWB01
22	2	"The Beat Goes On"	John Hoffman	Ben Smith & Joshua Allen Griffith	August 8, 2023	3DWB02
23	3	"Grab Your Hankies"	Adam Shankman	Matteo Borghese & Rob Turbovsky	August 15, 2023	3DWB03
24	4	"The White Room"	Adam Shankman	J. J. Philbin	August 22, 2023	3DWB04
25	5	"Ah, Love!"	Chris Koch	Tess Morris & Noah Levine	August 29, 2023	3DWB05
26	6	"Ghost Light"	Chris Koch	Madeleine George	September 5, 2023	3DWB06
27	7	"CoBro"	Cherien Dabis	Ben Philippe & Jake Schnesel	September 12, 2023	3DWB07
28	8	"Sitzprobe"	Shari Springer Berman & Robert Pulcini	Pete Swanson & Siena Streiber	September 19, 2023	3DWB08
29	9	"Thirty"	Cherien Dabis	Elaine Ko	September 26, 2023	3DWB09
30	10	"Opening Night"	Jamie Babbit	John Hoffman & Ben Smith	October 3, 2023	3DWB10

=== Season 4 (2024) ===
No. overall	No. in season	Title	Directed by	Written by	Original release date	Prod. code
31	1	"Once Upon a Time in the West"	John Hoffman	John Hoffman & Joshua Allen Griffith	August 27, 2024	4DWB01
32	2	"Gates of Heaven"	John Hoffman	Kristin Newman	September 3, 2024	4DWB02
33	3	"Two for the Road"	Chris Koch	Ben Smith & Pete Swanson	September 10, 2024	4DWB03
34	4	"The Stunt Man"	Chris Koch	Madeleine George	September 17, 2024	4DWB04
35	5	"Adaptation"	Jessica Yu	J. J. Philbin & Ella Robinson Brooks	September 24, 2024	4DWB05
36	6	"Blow-Up"	Jessica Yu	Rick Wiener & Kenny Schwartz	October 1, 2024	4DWB06
37	7	"Valley of the Dolls"	Shari Springer Berman & Robert Pulcini	Matteo Borghese & Rob Turbovsky	October 8, 2024	4DWB07
38	8	"Lifeboat"	Shari Springer Berman & Robert Pulcini	Kristin Newman & Jake Schnesel	October 15, 2024	4DWB08
39	9	"Escape from Planet Klongo"	Jamie Babbit	Ben Smith & Alex Bigelow	October 22, 2024	4DWB09
40	10	"My Best Friend's Wedding"	Jamie Babbit	John Hoffman & J. J. Philbin	October 29, 2024	4DWB10

=== Season 5 (2025) ===
No. overall	No. in season	Title	Directed by	Written by	Original release date	Prod. code
41	1	"Nail in the Coffin"	John Hoffman	John Hoffman & Taylor Cox	September 9, 2025	5DWB02
42	2	"After You"	John Hoffman	Ben Smith & Ella Robinson Brooks	September 9, 2025	5DWB01
43	3	"Rigor"	Chris Koch	Max Searle	September 9, 2025	5DWB03
44	4	"Dirty Birds"	Chris Koch	Kristin Newman	September 16, 2025	5DWB04
45	5	"Tongue Tied"	Shari Springer Berman & Robert Pulcini	J. J. Philbin	September 23, 2025	5DWB05
46	6	"Flatbush"	Shari Springer Berman & Robert Pulcini	John Enbom & Jake Schnesel	September 30, 2025	5DWB06
47	7	"Silver Alert"	Jessica Yu	Taylor Cox & Pete Swanson	October 7, 2025	5DWB07
48	8	"Cuckoo Chicks"	Jessica Yu	Kristin Newman & McKenna Thurber	October 14, 2025	5DWB08
49	9	"LESTR"	Jamie Babbit	Max Searle & Alex Bigelow	October 21, 2025	5DWB09
50	10	"The House Always…"	Jamie Babbit	J. J. Philbin & Ben Smith	October 28, 2025	5DWB10

=== Season 6 ===
No. overall	No. in season	Title	Directed by	Written by	Original release date	Prod. code
51	1	TBA	TBA	John Hoffman & Taylor Cox	December 8, 2026	TBA
52	2	TBA	TBA	Ben Smith & Jake Schnesel	December 8, 2026	TBA
53	3	TBA	TBA	Joshua Allen Griffith & Alex Bigelow	December 15, 2026	TBA
54	4	TBA	TBA	Sam Bain	December 22, 2026	TBA
55	5	TBA	TBA	Joshua Allen Griffith & Pete Swanson	December 29, 2026	TBA
56	6	TBA	TBA	Taylor Cox & Ella Robinson Brooks	January 5, 2027	TBA
57	7	TBA	TBA	Teleplay by : Brian Rosenwinkel; Story by : G.G. Green & Pamela Mamlet	January 12, 2027	TBA
58	8	TBA	TBA	Gaby Allan & Jennifer Crittenden & Thorunn Sigurdardottir	January 19, 2027	TBA
59	9	TBA	TBA	Bridget Carpenter & Brian Rosenwinkel	January 26, 2027	TBA
60	10	TBA	TBA	Ben Smith	January 26, 2027	TBA

== Production ==
=== Development ===
Steve Martin conceived the idea for Only Murders in the Building ten years before its premiere. His original idea involved three elderly men who discover that they are all obsessed with solving crimes, but are too old and tired to go outside, so they decide to only solve crimes that are in the building. The idea later developed with one of the old men changed to a younger woman. In January 2020, it was announced that Martin and Martin Short would star in the then untitled Hulu series, created by Martin and John Hoffman, with Martin, Short, and Hoffman as executive producers, alongside Dan Fogelman, with 20th Television serving as the studio; Selena Gomez would then join as the series's third main lead.

Hulu renewed the series for a second season in September 2021, a third season in July 2022, a fourth season in October 2023, a fifth season in September 2024, and a sixth season in October 2025.

=== Casting ===
Alongside the initial announcement, it was announced Martin and Short would star in the series. In August 2020, Gomez joined the cast and also serves as an executive producer. In November 2020, Aaron Dominguez joined the cast in a series regular role. In January 2021, Amy Ryan joined the cast in a series regular role and Nathan Lane joined the cast in a recurring role.

In December 2021, it was reported that Cara Delevingne joined the cast as a series regular for the second season. In January 2022, Short announced that Shirley MacLaine and Amy Schumer were cast to guest star for the second season. In February 2022, Michael Rapaport joined the cast in a recurring role for the second season.

In August 2022, it was announced that Paul Rudd had joined the cast for the third season, after appearing in a cameo at the end of the second season. In October 2022, Jesse Williams was cast in a recurring capacity for the third season. In January 2023, Meryl Streep was cast in an undisclosed capacity for the third season. In February 2023, Ashley Park joined the cast in a recurring role for the third season. In March 2023, Jeremy Shamos, Linda Emond, Wesley Taylor, Don Darryl Rivera, Allison Guinn, and Gerald Caesar were cast in recurring capacities for the third season. In April 2023, Michael Cyril Creighton was promoted to series regular for the third season.

In February 2024, Molly Shannon, Eva Longoria and Eugene Levy joined the cast in undisclosed recurring roles for the fourth season. Kumail Nanjiani and Zach Galifianakis were added in undisclosed recurring roles in March 2024. In April 2024, Desmin Borges, Siena Werber, Lilian Rebelo, Richard Kind, Daphne Rubin-Vega, Catherine Cohen, and Jin Ha joined the cast in recurring capacities. In May 2024, it was reported that Melissa McCarthy joined the cast.

In March 2025, Keegan-Michael Key, Christoph Waltz, and Renée Zellweger joined the cast in undisclosed roles for the fifth season. In April 2025, Logan Lerman, Jermaine Fowler and Beanie Feldstein joined the cast. In August 2025, Dianne Wiest and Bobby Cannavale were reported to have been respectively cast as Lester's wife and a mobster.

In June 2026, David Tennant, Sharon Horgan, Martin Freeman, Jim Broadbent, Jennifer Saunders, Geri Halliwell, Nicola Coughlan, Sean Teale, Simone Ashley, Jodie Whittaker, Rhea Norwood, Richard Ayoade, Amar Chadha-Patel, Matthew Beard, Jamie Demetriou, Anjana Vasan, Jane Horrocks, Derek Jacobi, Adrian Lukis, Kathryn Hunter and Lesley Nicol joined the cast in undisclosed roles for the sixth season. In July 2026, Olivia Colman was reported to have joined the cast, later confirmed in August. In August 2026, Peter Capaldi joined the cast.

=== Filming ===
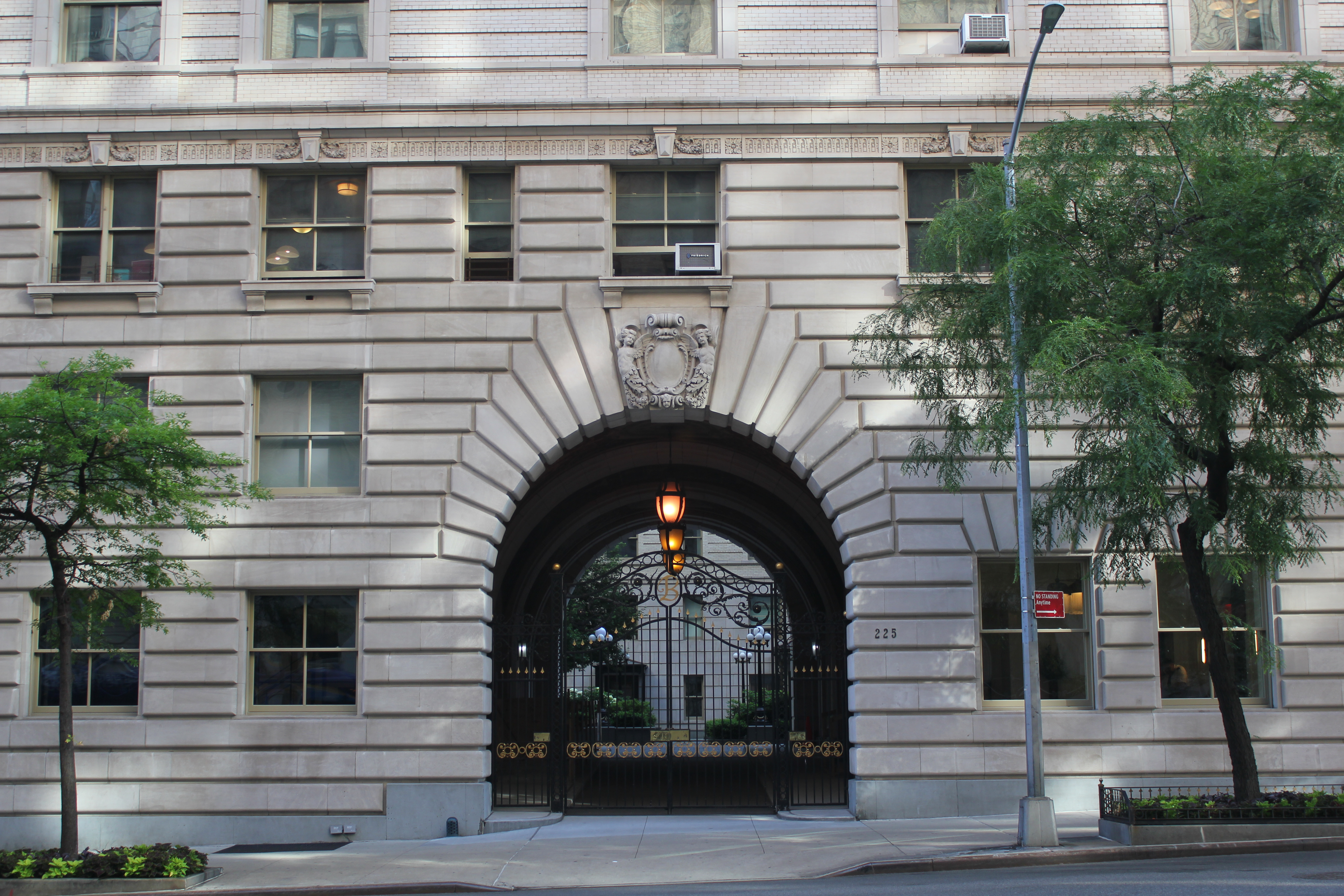
The Belnord on West 86th Street on the Upper West Side is used for exterior shots of the fictional Arconia apartment building.

Principal photography for the first season began on December 3, 2020, in New York City, and concluded in April 2021. The Belnord was used for exterior shots of the Arconia. Filming for the second season began on December 1, 2021 and ended in March 2022. Filming for the third season occurred between January and April 2023. Filming for the fourth season took place between March and June 2024. Filming for the fifth season occurred between March and June 2025. Filming for the sixth season occurred in London between May and August 2026.

=== Music ===
A digital album for the score was released on August 27, 2021, four days before the series's debut. On July 15, 2022, the original song that was played briefly in the second season episode "Here's Looking at You", "Angel in Flip-Flops", was released online. It was performed by Steve Martin as his character Charles-Haden Savage, and written by Martin and Kirker Butler, with Paul Shaffer as producer. An album for the second season was released on August 12, 2022. An album for the third season was released on September 15, 2023, followed by a deluxe edition on October 4. An album for the fourth season was released on October 25, 2024. An album for the fifth season was released on October 24, 2025.

== Release ==
The first season of Only Murders in the Building premiered on August 31, 2021, on Hulu in the United States. Internationally, the series premiered on the same day on Disney+ under the dedicated streaming hub Star, as an original series, and on Star+ in Latin America. Disney+ Hotstar released the series in select territories on September 3, 2021. On Disney+, Disney+ Hotstar, and Star+, episodes were scheduled to debut on a weekly basis. The second season premiered on June 28, 2022. The third season premiered on August 8, 2023. The fourth season premiered on August 27, 2024. The fifth season premiered on September 9, 2025, with three new episodes and the rest debuting on a weekly basis. The sixth season is scheduled to premiere on December 8, 2026.

The first season made its broadcast television premiere on ABC on January 2, 2024. Episodes were edited to meet broadcast standards and practices and follow FCC rules. The show was added to Disney+ in the United States via the Hulu hub beginning in December 2023. The second season made its broadcast television premiere on ABC on January 2, 2025.

== Reception ==
=== Critical response ===
Critical response of Only Murders in the Building
Season	Rotten Tomatoes	Metacritic
1	100% (107 reviews)	76 (34 reviews)
2	98% (122 reviews)	79 (25 reviews)
3	97% (134 reviews)	77 (34 reviews)
4	93% (127 reviews)	78 (29 reviews)
5	89% (66 reviews)	71 (16 reviews)

The series has overall scores of 95% on Rotten Tomatoes and 77 on Metacritic.

For the first season, review aggregator website Rotten Tomatoes reported a 100% approval rating based on 107 critic reviews with an average rating of 8.1/10. The website's critics consensus reads, "Only Murders in the Building's silly approach to true crime obsessives is at once hilarious and insightful, thanks in large part to its extremely charming central trio." Metacritic gave the first season a weighted average score of 76 out of 100 based on 34 critic reviews, indicating "generally favorable".

For the second season, Rotten Tomatoes reported a 98% approval rating based on 122 critic reviews with an average rating of 8/10. The website's critics consensus states, "Only Murders in the Building gets a new lease on life with a knottier sophomore outing that retains the series's core charm and wit." Metacritic gave the second season a weighted average score of 79 out of 100 based on 25 critic reviews, signifying "generally favorable".

For the third season, Rotten Tomatoes reported a 97% approval rating based on 134 critic reviews with an average rating of 8.05/10. The website's critics consensus reads, "Relocating the action to the theatre, Only Murders in the Building can take a bow for yet another twisty mystery handled with a good-humored touch." Metacritic gave the third season a weighted average score of 77 out of 100 based on 34 critic reviews, indicating "generally favorable".

For the fourth season, Rotten Tomatoes reported a 93% approval rating based on 127 critic reviews with an average rating of 7.75/10. The website's critics consensus states, "The gang is back together in a more metatextual season full of famous faces, continuing Only Murders in the Building's reign as one of television's most delightful comedies." Metacritic gave the fourth season a weighted average score of 78 out of 100 based on 29 critic reviews, signifying "generally favorable".

For the fifth season, Rotten Tomatoes reported an 89% approval rating, based on 66 critic reviews with an average rating of 6.95/10. The website's critics consensus reads, "Putting the very fate of the Arconia on the line, Only Murders in the Building's fifth season goes back to the series' fundamentals — its core trio — and reaffirms that their charm hasn't waned one bit." Metacritic gave the fifth season a weighted average score of 71 out of 100 based on 16 critic reviews, signifying "generally favorable".

=== Accolades ===
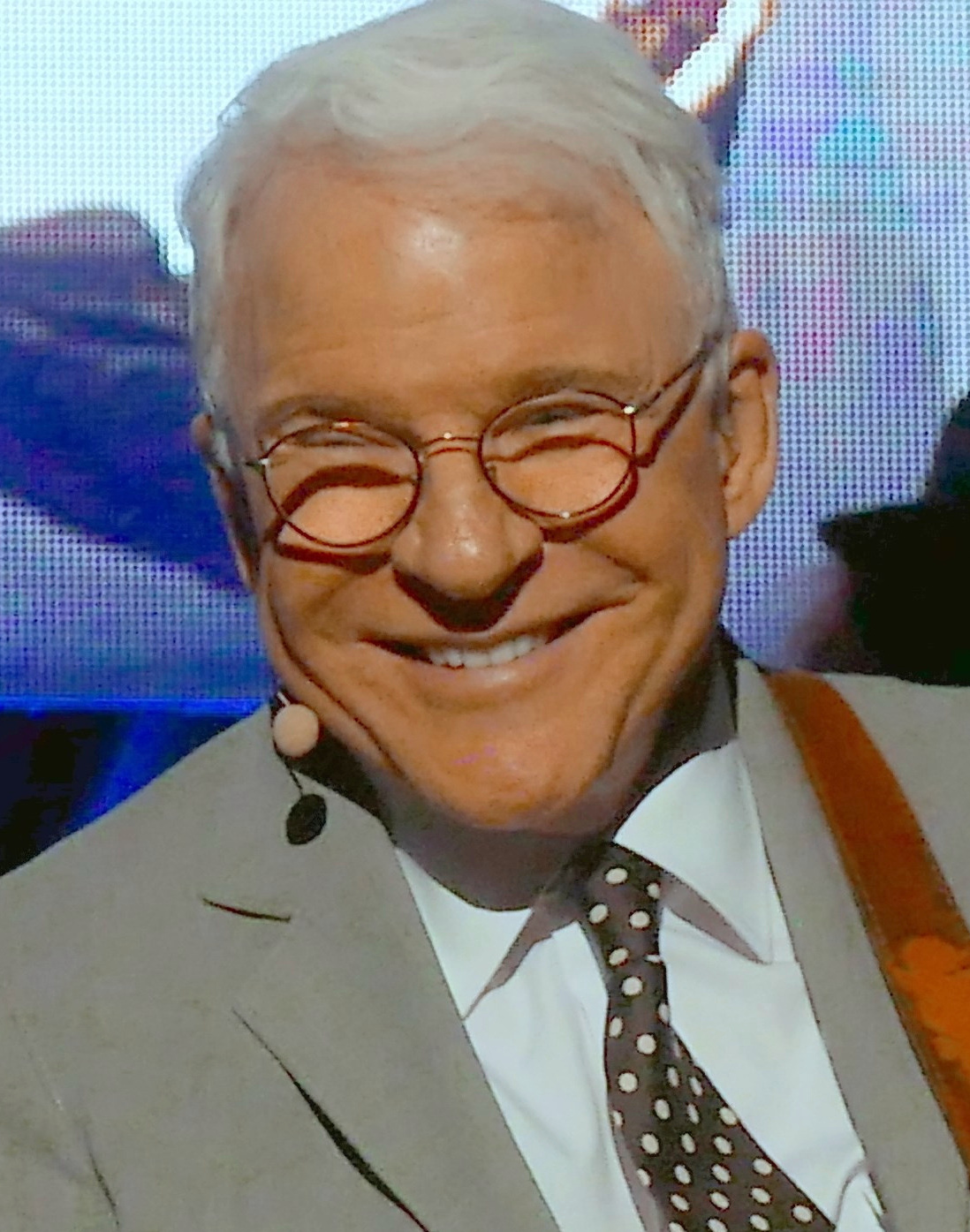
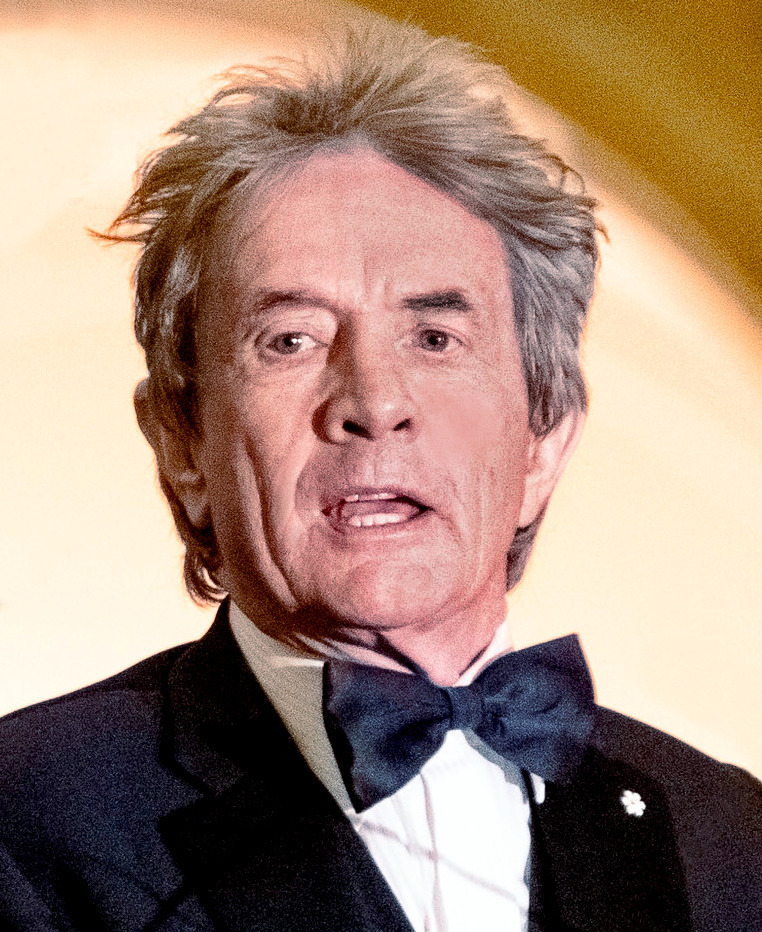
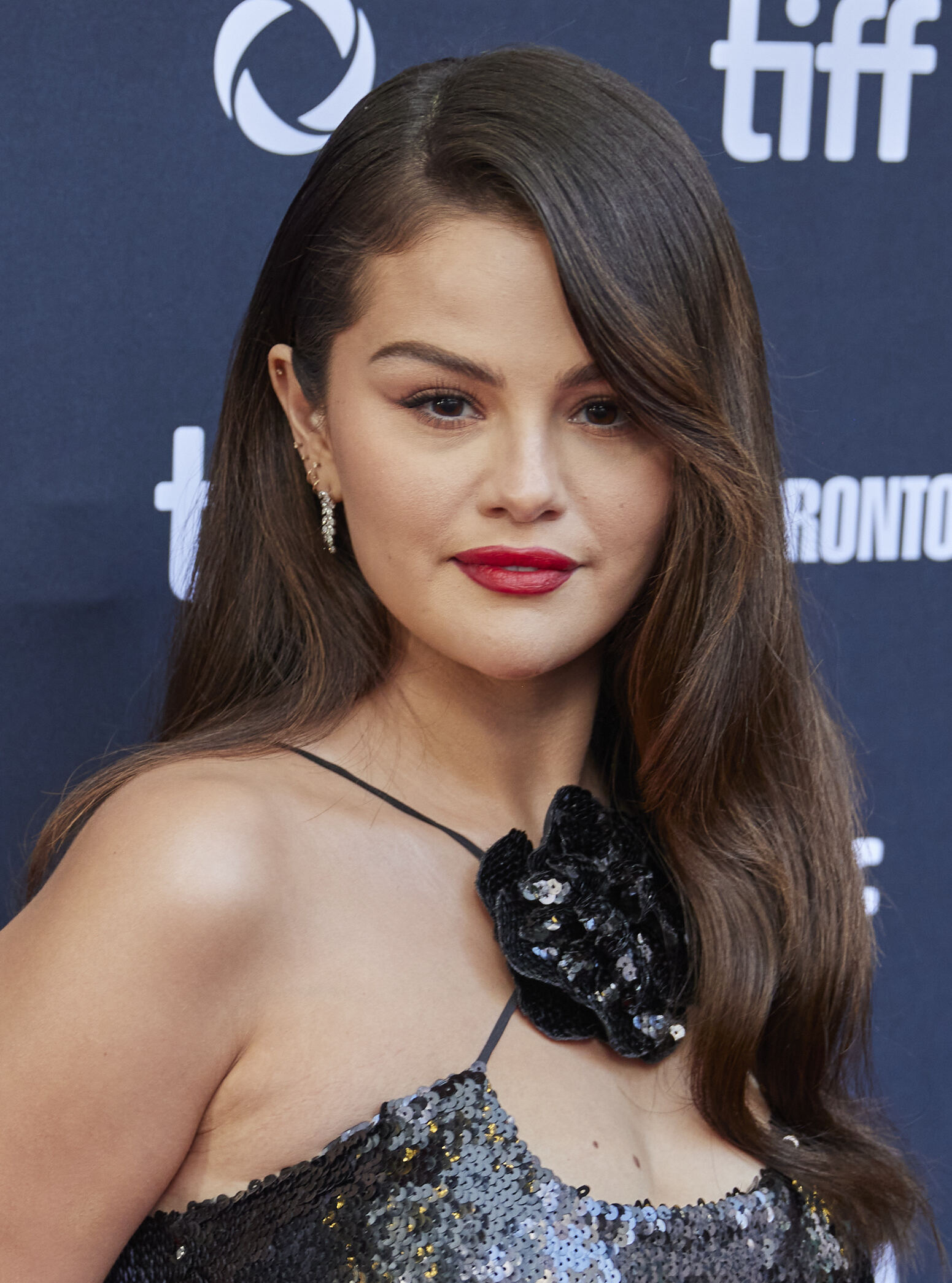
The performances of the main cast, namely (left to right) Steve Martin, Martin Short, and Selena Gomez, have received critical acclaim.

The series has received 61 Emmy nominations, with seven wins. The first season received 17 nominations at the 74th Primetime Emmy Awards, with three wins, including Nathan Lane for Outstanding Guest Actor in a Comedy Series. Notable nominations included, Outstanding Comedy Series, Steve Martin and Martin Short for Outstanding Lead Actor in a Comedy Series, Jamie Babbit and Cherien Dabis for Outstanding Directing for a Comedy Series, and Martin and John Hoffman for Outstanding Writing for a Comedy Series.

The second season received 11 nominations at the 75th Primetime Emmy Awards, with one win in a technical category. Notable nominations included Outstanding Comedy Series, Short for Outstanding Lead Actor in a Comedy Series, Lane for Outstanding Guest Actor in a Comedy Series, and one nomination for Outstanding Writing for a Comedy Series.

The third season received 21 nominations at the 76th Primetime Emmy Awards, with three wins at the Creative Arts Emmy Awards. Notable nominations included Outstanding Comedy Series, Martin and Short for Outstanding Lead Actor in a Comedy Series, Selena Gomez for Outstanding Lead Actress in a Comedy Series, Paul Rudd for Outstanding Supporting Actor in a Comedy Series, Meryl Streep for Outstanding Supporting Actress in a Comedy Series, Matthew Broderick for Outstanding Guest Actor in a Comedy Series, and Da'Vine Joy Randolph for Outstanding Guest Actress in a Comedy Series. The song "Which of the Pickwick Triplets Did It?", which was featured in the eighth episode of the third season, won the Primetime Emmy Award for Outstanding Original Music and Lyrics.

The fourth season received 2 major nominations at the 77th Primetime Emmy Awards, for Outstanding Comedy Series and Martin Short for Outstanding Lead Actor in a Comedy Series.

The fifth season received 2 major nominations at the 78th Primetime Emmy Awards, for Outstanding Comedy Series and Martin Short for Outstanding Lead Actor in a Comedy Series.

Additionally, the series aftershow Only Murders in the Building: One Killer Question has received two Emmy nominations for Outstanding Short Form Comedy, Drama or Variety Series, winning once, and the behind-the-scenes companion series Only Murders in the Building: Unlocking the Mystery has received one Emmy nomination for Outstanding Short Form Nonfiction or Reality Series.

=== Viewership ===
On September 3, 2021, Hulu reported that Only Murders in the Building set a record for the most-watched comedy premiere in the platform's history. On October 28, 2021, Hulu Originals president Craig Erwich said in an interview with Vulture that the show had become the most-watched comedy ever on Hulu "by a good measure." In the same article, Vulture reported that, according to Parrot Analytics, the show went from having around 16 times the audience demand in the U.S. as an average show when it debuted on August 31 to generating 37 times typical demand by the time the season 1 finale dropped on October 19. This meant that the day after the finale, the show ranked as high as 14th on the list of most in-demand shows in the U.S. and signaled a "massive" 135% growth rate that according to Erwich is mainly attributable to word of mouth. According to the streaming aggregator JustWatch, Only Murders in the Building was the most-streamed TV series across all American platforms during the week ending October 24, 2021, and second during the week ending October 31, 2021.

According to Parrot Analytics, which looks at consumer engagement in consumer research, streaming, downloads, and on social media, Only Murders in the Building was the third-most in-demand streaming original series in the U.S. during the week of August 13 to 19, 2022, as well as during the week of August 20 to 26. According to Whip Media's viewership tracking app TV Time, it was the most-streamed TV series across all U.S. platforms during the week ending August 7, 2022, and during the week of August 28. According to the streaming aggregator JustWatch, it was the third-most streamed TV series across all American platforms during the week ending July 3, 2022. Whip Media announced Only Murders in the Building was the fifth most-watched streaming original television series of 2023. Nielsen Media Research, which records streaming viewership on U.S. television screens, reported that from June 1, 2024, to May 31, 2025, it was streamed for a total of 159.1 million hours.

== Companion podcast ==
In collaboration with Hulu, Straw Hut Media released an official behind-the-scenes companion podcast, Only Murders in the Pod, featuring interviews with cast, crew, and writers. While the first two seasons were hosted by Kevin Lawn and Elizabeth Keener, due to the SAG-AFTRA and Writers Guild of America strikes in 2023, producers Maggie Boles and Ryan Tillotson hosted season three and interviewed directors and other crew members.

Notable guests on the podcast include John Hoffman, Martin Short, Pasek and Paul, Shirley MacLaine, Shari Springer Berman and Robert Pulcini, Jackie Hoffman, and Amy Ryan. Boles and Tillotson continued to host season four with notable guests including John Hoffman, Daphne Rubin-Vega, Amy Ryan, Richard Kind, Madeleine George, Jane Lynch, Michael Cyril Creighton, J. J. Philbin, Jessica Yu, Molly Shannon, Catherine Cohen, Eva Longoria, Shari Springer Berman and Robert Pulcini, Desmin Borges, and Jin Ha.
