= J. J. Philbin =

American television producer and writer

- Born: Jennifer Joy Philbin; August 30, 1974 (age 52); New York City, U.S.
- Education: University of Notre Dame
- Occupations: Producer, screenwriter
- Spouse: Michael Schur (m. 2005)
- Children: 2
- Parents: Regis Philbin (father); Joy Philbin (mother)

Jennifer Joy Philbin (born August 30, 1974) is an American producer and screenwriter, best known for her work on the drama series The O.C. She is the daughter of television stars Regis and Joy Philbin.

== Early life and education ==
Philbin was born in New York City to Regis Philbin and Joy Philbin. She attended The Loomis Chaffee School in Windsor, Connecticut, where she was a boarding student. She graduated from the University of Notre Dame in 1996.

She has said that, growing up, she always wanted to be a writer of some sort, but she particularly enjoyed writing scripts for amateur short films she made with her friends.

== Career ==
Philbin's career began soon after she graduated from the University of Notre Dame in 1996 when she became a writer for Mad TV, and then joined the script department of Saturday Night Live, where she worked until 1999. Philbin and the other Saturday Night Live writers were nominated for a Writers Guild of America Award in 2000 in the category of "Comedy/Variety Series". In 2002, she moved on to That Was Then, an ABC drama series, as a writer, and in 2003 began work on the comedy-drama series Dead Like Me, for which she served as both writer and script supervisor for several episodes. She worked as a story editor for the sitcom Coupling. In 2004, she joined the O.C. crew after Coupling was canceled and The O.C.'s producers offered her a writing position.

She served as story editor for The O.C. from 2004 to 2005. In 2005, she was promoted to executive story editor and stayed on from 2005 until the series ended in 2007. She also wrote 12 episodes and co-produced another four. Following The O.C.'s end, she wrote one episode of the second season of science fiction drama Heroes, which aired on NBC.

In 2011, Philbin became a consulting producer on the Fox sitcom New Girl. From 2018 to 2020, she served as co-creator and executive producer of the ABC sitcom Single Parents.

In 2023, Philbin became a co-executive producer on the Hulu series Only Murders in the Building, where she has remained since. She has also been credited with writing two episodes of the show's third and fourth seasons.

== Personal life ==
While working on Saturday Night Live in 1998, she met Michael Schur, who had also been hired to write for the show. They married in 2005. They have two children, born in 2008 and 2010.
