= Michael Cyril Creighton =

American actor (born 1978 or 1979)

- Born: 1978 or 1979 (age 47–48); Long Island, New York, U.S.
- Occupation: Actor
- Years active: 2003–present
- Website: michaelcyrilcreighton.com

Michael Cyril Creighton (born 1978 or 1979) is an American actor best known for his portrayal of Howard Morris in Only Murders in the Building, Patrick in High Maintenance, Joe Crowley in Spotlight, and his web series Jack in a Box, which received the Writers Guild of America Award for Best Short Form New Media.

== Early life ==
Creighton was raised on Long Island, New York, by his mother and maternal grandparents. Creighton attended Emerson College, graduating in 2001.

== Career ==
Creighton has performed in film, television, and theatre in both comedic and dramatic roles. Sarah Larson of The New Yorker says "Creighton has a gift for expressing the tension between the desire to connect and the desire to protect oneself."

On the stage, Creighton's credits include the world premiere of Jordan Harrison's The Amateurs at Vineyard Theater and the New York premiere of Sarah Ruhl's Stage Kiss at Playwrights Horizons. For his portrayal of Kevin in Stage Kiss, he was named a "Face to Watch" by The New York Times and nominated for an Outer Critics Circle Award for Outstanding Featured Actor in a Play. He has worked numerous times with the Brooklyn-based theater company The Debate Society, originating several roles.

As a writer, in addition to creating and starring in the Writers Guild Award-winning web series Jack in a Box (2009–2012), he wrote and guest starred in the episode "Helen" of the web series High Maintenance created by Katja Blichfeld and Ben Sinclair.

He was a founding member of the New York Neo-Futurists and performed weekly in Too Much Light Makes the Baby Go Blind.

== Filmography ==
=== Television ===
Year	Title	Role	Notes
2009–2012	Jack in a Box	Jack	31 episodes; also creator, writer, director, producer
2010	Jeffery & Cole Casserole	Hal	Episode: "The Erin Brockovitch"
2010	30 Rock	BWL Salesman	Episode: "Brooklyn Without Limits"
2010–2012	Very Mary-Kate	Photo Director	2 episodes
2012	Louie	Marvin	2 episodes
2013	Orange Is the New Black	Store Manager	Episode: "Bora Bora Bora"
2013	Person of Interest	Russell	Episode: "The Perfect Mark"
2013–2019	High Maintenance	Patrick	Recurring; also writer
2014	Nurse Jackie	Sperm Scout	Episode: "Super Greens"
2015	Sex & Drugs & Rock & Roll	Bobby Q	Episode: "Supercalifragilisticjuliefriggingandrews"
2015	2 Broke Girls	I	Episode: "And The Inside-Outside Situation"
2016	The Outs	Gordy	Recurring
2016	Horace and Pete	Michael/Mike	2 episodes
2017	The Good Fight	Tab Bentley	Episode: "Social Media and Its Discontents"
2017	Neon Joe, Werewolf Hunter	Frank	Episode: "Rules of the Road"
2017	Graves	Phoenix Wells	Recurring
2018	Billions	Dr. Martin Yancy	Episode: "Flaw in the Death Star"
2018	Bob's Burgers	Spencer (voice)	Episode: "Mo Mommy, Mo Problems"
2020	AJ and the Queen	Christian	Episode: "Baton Rouge"
2020	Dash & Lily	Jeff the Elf/Door Queen	Recurring
2021–2022	Dexter: New Blood	Fred Jr.	Recurring
2021–present	Only Murders in the Building	Howard Morris	Main role (seasons 3–5); recurring role (seasons 1–2)
2022	Blue Bloods	Jonathan	Episode: "Guilt"
2022	A League of Their Own	Henry	Episode: "Batter Up"
2022	New Amsterdam	Ken Podolsky	Episode: "All the World's a Stage..."
2023	The Marvelous Mrs. Maisel	Mel	Recurring
2024	American Horror Stories	Martin	Episode: "Leprechaun"

=== Film ===
Year	Title	Role	Notes
2005	Cotton Candy	Matthew	Short film
2013	How to Follow Strangers	Michael	
2014	Mr. Lamb	Waiter	Short film
2015	3rd Street Blackout	Gossipy Man	
2015	Sleeping with Other People	Attentive Waiter	
2015	Spotlight	Joe Crowley	
2017	Coin Heist	Mr. Rankin	
2017	Fits and Starts	Richard Pringle	
2017	Home Again	Brad	
2017	The Post	Jake	
2018	Game Night	Bill	
2018	Can You Ever Forgive Me?	Harry	
2020	The Outside Story	Andre	
2020	Paper Spiders	Mr. Wessler	
2020	The Dark End of the Street	Isaac	
2023	The Feeling That the Time for Doing Something Has Passed	Karl	
2023	American Fiction	John Bosco	
2026	The Man with the Bag †		Post-production

=== Stage ===
Year	Title	Role	Notes
2007	The Vietnamization of New Jersey	Father McGillicutty	Off-Broadway
2008	Cape Disappointment	Russell/Jack/Florence	The Debate Society
2009–2010	MilkMilkLemonade	Nana	Under St. Marks & APAC
2010	You're Welcome	Various Characters	The Debate Society
2010–2011	Buddy Cop 2	Don McMurchie	The Debate Society
2012–2013	Blood Play	Morty Feinberg	The Debate Society
2014	Stage Kiss	Kevin	Playwrights Horizons
2018	The Amateurs	Gregory	Vineyard Theater
2026	The Adding Machine	The Everyman	The New Group

== Awards and nominations ==
- 2010 New York Innovative Theatre Awards, Nominee for Outstanding Actor in a Featured Role (for MilkMilkLemonade)
- 2010 New York Television Festival, Winner, Best Web Series Pilot (for Jack in a Box)
- 2012 Writers Guild of America Award, Nominee, Outstanding Achievement in Writing Original New Media (for Jack in a Box)
- 2013 Writers Guild of America Award, Winner, Outstanding Achievement in Writing Original New Media (for Jack in a Box)
- 2014 Outer Critics Circle Award, Nominee, Outstanding Featured Actor in a Play (for Stage Kiss)
- 2016 Film Independent Spirit Awards, Winner, Robert Altman Award (for Spotlight)
- 2023 Screen Actors Guild Award, Nominee, Outstanding Performance by an Ensemble in a Comedy Series (for Only Murders in the Building)
- 2024 Screen Actors Guild Award, Winner, Outstanding Performance by an Ensemble in a Comedy Series (for Only Murders in the Building)
