= John Robert Hoffman =

American actor, screenwriter, director, and producer

- Occupations: Actor; screenwriter; director
- Years active: 1992–present

John Robert Hoffman is an American actor, screenwriter, director, and producer. He wrote and co-starred in the Disney Channel original film Northern Lights (1997).

Hoffman made his theatrical film debut (as both writer and director) with the MGM/Jim Henson Pictures comedy Good Boy! (2003) Hoffman was nominated for a Primetime Emmy Award as part of the writing team for the 81st Academy Awards (2009). Hoffman has also contributed, as both a writer and producer, to the HBO series Looking (2014–2015) and the Netflix series Grace and Frankie (2016–2022). In 2021, Hoffman co-created the hit Hulu original series Only Murders in the Building with Steve Martin.

Hoffman played the Mad Hatter in Disney's Adventures in Wonderland (1992–1995).

== Filmography ==
- Attack of the 5 Ft. 2 In. Women (1994) as Jeff Googooly
- Fortune Hunter (1994) as Harry Flack
- Adventures in Wonderland (1992–94) as Mad Hatter / Copy-Catter Hatter
- Courthouse (1995) as Morgan / Justine's Assistant
- The Larry Sanders Show (1996) as David
- Northern Lights (1997) as Joe Scarlotti
- Only Murders in the Building (2021–present), series co-created with Steve Martin
