= Have You Seen My Sister Evelyn? =

Song by Evelyn Evelyn

Song by Evelyn Evelyn

from the album Evelyn Evelyn
- Genre: Ragtime
- Length: 2:13
- Label: 11 Records; 8ft. records
- Producers: Amanda Palmer; Jason Webley

"Have You Seen My Sister Evelyn?" is a song by the fictional musical duo Evelyn Evelyn, created and portrayed by American musicians Amanda Palmer and Jason Webley. It is included on their 2007 EP Elephant Elephant and their 2010 album Evelyn Evelyn.

== Background and lyrics ==
Evelyn Evelyn is a fictional musical duo created and portrayed by American musicians Amanda Palmer and Jason Webley. The duo consists of Evelyn and Evelyn Neville, a pair of conjoined twins said to have been discovered in 2007 by Palmer and Webley. "Have You Seen My Sister Evelyn?" is the fourth track on Evelyn Evelyn's self-titled debut studio album, released in 2010, a concept album about the sisters' lives.

The lyrics of "Have You Seen My Sister Evelyn?" comically frame the twins' relationship as though they were not conjoined, and one of the two "enjoys a life of sleeping around."

== Music video ==
The official live-action/animated music video for "Have You Seen My Sister Evelyn?", released in 2011, was the first music video directed by Hoku Uchiyama. The video depicts the Evelyns, portrayed in live-action by Lexi and Nikki Ibrahim, creating drawings on a foggy window that come to life in the style of rubber hose animation. Alongside Uchiyama, the video's production team included producer and lead animator Adam Bolt, digital composite artists Michael Scott and Travis Gorman, and producers Matt Miller and Erich Lochner of production company Vanishing Angle.

To create the desired effect for the video, the filming crew tested how to film condensation on glass for several weeks. On the day of shooting, the camera was unable to adequately capture footage of the condensation, so the crew improvised a solution using water and dulling spray, which they later reproduced digitally. The animation was then added on top of the layer of condensation, which was itself on top of a layer of live-action footage of the Ibrahim sisters as the Evelyns. Scott and Gorman used the software Nuke for compositing, and Mocha for motion tracking; Bolt and a team of animators created the animation frame-by-frame.

The video won the award for Best Music Video at the 2012 Byron Bay International Film Festival.

== Reception ==
Scott Thill of Wired called the song "a ragtime laugher", and PopMatters' David Amidon called it an "Album highlight [...] a fun song, but there's little explanation in the narrative for its existence." Heather Phares, in a positive review of the album for AllMusic, wrote that "Have You Seen My Sister Evelyn?", along with the album's eighth track, "Elephant Elephant", each give "the Ditty Bops a three-legged run for their money."

== Personnel ==
Adapted from the album's liner notes.

- Evelyn and Evelyn Neville (Amanda Palmer and Jason Webley) – vocals, piano, ukulele, guitar, accordion
- Amanda Palmer – piano, Wurlitzer
- Jason Webley – accordion
- Tim Smolens – contra bass

Production

- Jason Schimmel – engineering
- Tim Smolens – engineering, mixing, and editing
- Jason Webley – engineering
- John Golden – mastering
