= The Cost of Living (Jason Webley album) =

Studio album by Jason Webley
- Released: October 11, 2007
- Genre: Folk
- Length: 42:09
- Label: 11 Records
- Producers: Jason Webley; Jherek Bischoff

Jason Webley chronology
Only Just Beginning (2004)	The Cost of Living (2007)

Professional ratings
Review scores
Source	Rating
Allmusic	3.5/5 stars

The Cost of Living is the fifth album by Jason Webley, released in 2007.

== Track listing ==
1. "Still" - 3:33
2. "Ways to Love" - 5:02
3. "Almost Time to Go" - 3:37
4. "They Just Want" - 3:44
5. "Disappear" - 3:43
6. "Raise Them Higher" - 3:46
7. "Meet Your Bride" - 3:41
8. "Clear" - 3:14
9. "Little Sister" - 2:37 (uses a variation on music from the song "Kykyrý" by Jana Vébrová)
10. "Back to You Again" - 4:30
11. "There's Not a Step We Can Take That Does Not Bring Us Closer" - 4:16

== Personnel ==
- Jason Webley - vocals, guitar, accordion, piano, marimba, glockenspiel
- Jherek Bischoff - bass, guitarron, percussion, electric guitar, trombone
- L. Alex Guy - viola, violin
- Michael McQuilken - drums, percussion
