= Viaje =

Viaje (English: 'travel') or El Viaje or Un Viaje may refer to:

== Film and TV ==
- Viaje (film), a 2015 film
- The Journey (1942 film), or El viaje, an Argentine film
- The Journey (1992 film) or El viaje, an Argentine film

== Books ==
- Un Viaje (book), satirical travelogue by Felipe Pardo y Aliaga, 1840

== Music ==
- Viaje (Jason Webley album), 1998
- Viaje (Ricardo Arjona album), 2014
- De Viaje, a 2003 album by Sin Bandera
- Un Viaje (album), by Café Tacuba

=== Songs ===
- "El Viaje", a song by Antonio Orozco
- "El Viaje", a tango composed by Astor Piazzolla
- "El Viaje", a song by Eros Ramazzotti
- "Un Viaje", a song by Wisin y Yandel from Los Vaqueros
