= Only Just Beginning =

Studio album by Jason Webley
- Released: 2004
- Genre: Folk
- Length: 51:55
- Label: 11 Records
- Producer: Jason Webley

Jason Webley chronology
Counterpoint (2002)	Only Just Beginning (2004)	The Cost of Living (2007)

Professional ratings
Review scores
Source	Rating
Allmusic	link

Only Just Beginning is the fourth album by Jason Webley, released in 2004.

== Track listing ==
1. "February Relaxing Her Fingers After a Brief Winter's Grip" – 4:18
2. "Music That Puts Everything Together" – 4:54
3. "Balloon Feather Boat Tomato" – 5:11
4. "Icarus" – 3:55
5. "Mine" – 3:38
6. "Map" – 4:38
7. "Viaje" – 4:01
8. "May Day" – 3:20
9. "With" – 7:50
10. "Coda" – 10:10

== Personnel ==
- Jason Webley – vocals, guitar, accordion, piano, etc.
- Michael McQuilken – percussion
- Jherek Bischoff – bass
- Seth Warren – violin
- Liz Sprout Guy – viola
- Taryn Webber – cello
- Brant Campbell – clarinet, alto saxophone
- Fred Hawkinson – trombone
- Gary Luke – tuba
