= Counterpoint (Jason Webley album) =

Studio album by Jason Webley
- Released: 2002
- Genre: Folk
- Length: 69:58
- Label: 11 Records
- Producer: Jason Webley

Jason Webley chronology
Against the Night (1999)	Counterpoint (2002)	Only Just Beginning (2004)

Professional ratings
Review scores
Source	Rating
Allmusic	2.5/5 stars

Counterpoint is the third album by Jason Webley, released in 2002.

== Track listing ==
1. "Southern Cross" - 6:16
2. "Broken Cup" - 6:12
3. "Quite Contrary" - 3:08
4. "Then" - 4:44
5. "It's Not Time to Go Yet" - 5:59
6. "The Graveyard" - 6:38
7. "Northern Lights" - 5:17
8. "Drinking Song" - 3:57
9. "Counterpart" - 4:44
10. "Now" - 3:12
11. "Goodbye Forever Once Again" - 7:39
12. "Train Tracks" - 12:12

== Personnel ==
- Jason Webley - vocals (1–12), guitar (1–3, 7, 11), accordion (1–3, 5, 8, 12), bowls and bells (1, 7), marimba (3), piano (4, 7, 9), pump organ (4), shovel (6), Rhodes (7), banjo (10)
- Jherek Bischoff - bass (1–4, 6, 7, 9–12)
- Michael McQuilken - drums (1–3, 6, 8, 10–12), dishes (1)
- Harry Pierce - clarinet (2, 6, 8, 12), saxophone (2, 8), flute (12)
- Josh Stewart - trumpet (3, 10, 12)
- Andrea McCrady, M.D. - carillon (5)
- Gary Luke - tuba (6, 8, 12)
- Adam McCollum and Fred Hawkinson - trombone (6)
- John Schurman - trumpet (6)
- Paulo Pereira - cello (6, 9)
- Eyvind Kang - viola (6), violin (6)
- Olli Klomp - cajon (7)
- Reggie Watts - keyboard (10)
- Greg Powers - trombone (10, 12)
- Jon Hyde - pedal steel guitar (11)
