= Eliza Rickman =

American indie singer (born 1983)

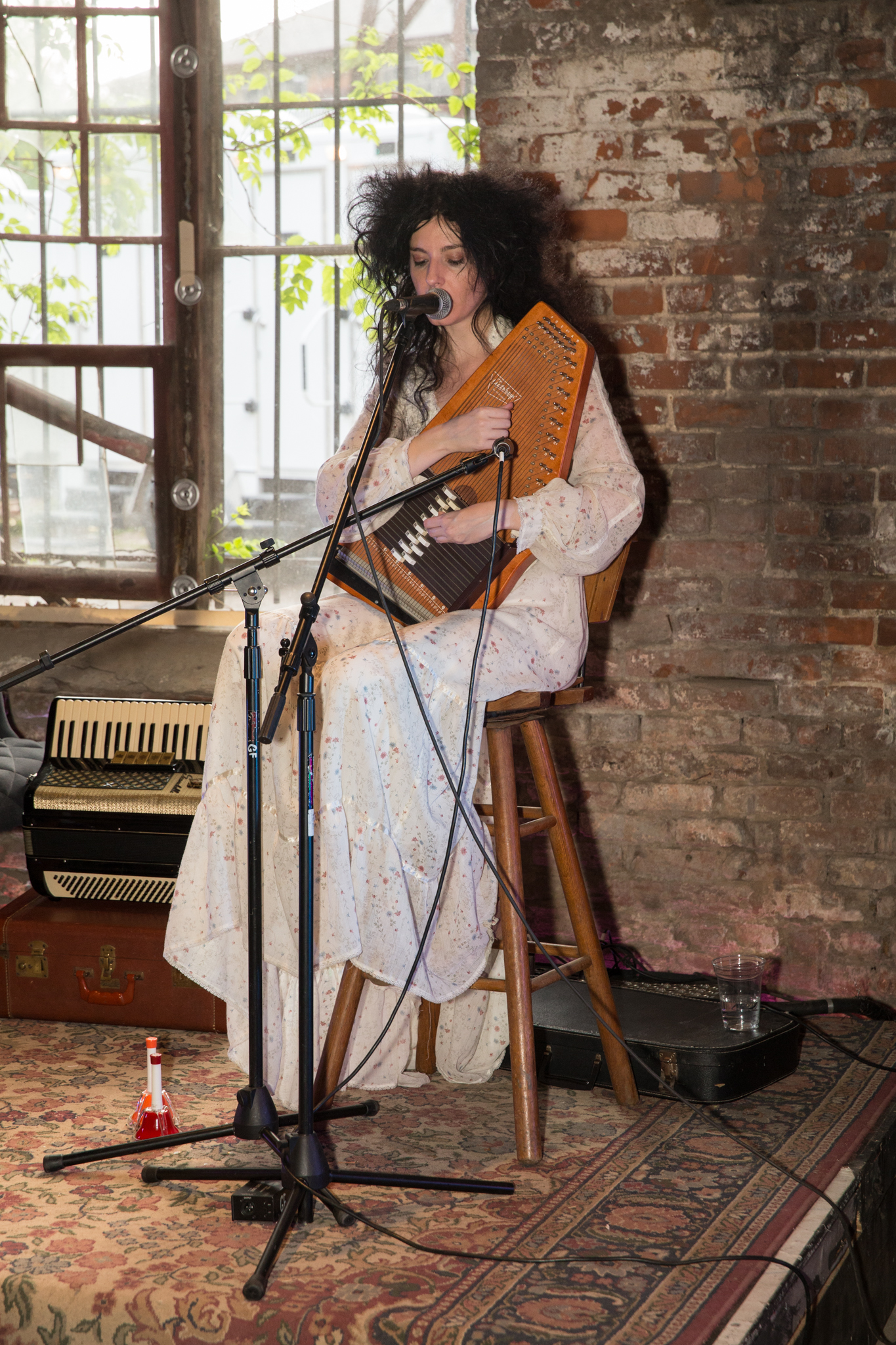

Background information
- Born: August 17, 1983 (age 42); Okinawa, Japan
- Genres: Indie folk, baroque pop, chamber pop, indie
- Instruments: Vocals, autoharp, ukulele, piano, toy piano, accordion, kazoo, percussion
- Label: Independent
- Website: http://www.elizarickman.com/

Eliza Rickman is an American indie singer, songwriter, and pianist from Los Angeles, California. She is best known for her use of unconventional musical instruments, such as the toy piano, and her vintage Victorian Era dresses, as well as her collaborations with the podcast Welcome to Night Vale and musician Jason Webley.

== Early life ==
Eliza Rickman was born on August 17, 1983, in Okinawa, Japan. Her father was in the military, and then became a Baptist preacher, while her mother is a secretary at the same church. She started to play piano at the age of eight.

Rickman attended the College of Music and the Arts at the Evangelical University Azusa Pacific University in Los Angeles, California, and graduated with a Bachelor of Arts in music and orchestration, with her primary focus on piano performance. Her original intention was to be a concert pianist, and she had never previously considered a career as a singer-songwriter. Rickman previously thought herself unable to sing, but due to curriculum requirements, she had to take a voice class, in which she was required to sing. Through this class a professor encouraged her to continue singing.

== Career ==
The lineup of her first band consisted of musicians she met through Azusa Pacific University, some of whom she met while attending college there, while others she met after graduation. Alex Russell, the violinist and professor at Azusa Pacific, started playing for Rickman after she graduated. After graduating, she began booking shows at various small venues, but found she attracted more of an audience in her street performances. In 2009, she recorded her first EP, entitled Gild the Lily, which was recorded by one of Rickman's frequent collaborators, Robert DeLong, on his laptop in a haunted chapel. Gild the Lily was released on March 7, 2009.

She primarily stayed and performed in Los Angeles, due to its prominence as a primary music scene. Owing to demands from fans, she sought to record and release a number of songs she had written and performed on a full-length LP. According to Rickman, she went through her favorite CDs and made a list of the engineers and producers and began contacting them. Since Andrew Bird is among her favorite artists, his engineer Mark Greenberg was on the top of her list. Greenberg expressed interest in recording Rickman and her band. The majority of her first full-length album, entitled O, You Sinners, was recorded in December 2011 and January 2012 in The Mayfair Recordings studio and JoyRide Studio of Mark Greenberg in Chicago, Illinois O, You Sinners was released on March 6, 2012.

Following this, Rickman grew disheartened from not being able to secure industry attention, and after recording O, You Sinners in Chicago, she decided to "uproot" herself and begin a nomadic stage of her career. She gave up her home in Los Angeles, and even her beloved cat into the care of friends, to tour and perform at any venue she could secure, including house concerts, to build up a fan base. After six years of following this lifestyle, she has returned to Los Angeles and is working on touring more effectively.

In 2014, Eliza Rickman was invited to tour with Welcome to Night Vale to perform as the opening act and during "the weather" portion of their live shows. She performed "Cinnamon Bone" for The Librarian tour (2014), and "Maker of My Sorrow" for The Investigators tour (2015). She also performed for "the weather" in the Ghost Stories tour (2016) and in the first half of the U.S. portion of the All Hail tour (2017). On April 15, 2015, Rickman had her song "Pretty Little Head" featured as "the weather" on Welcome to Night Vale Episode 45 – "A Story About Them".

Also in 2014, Rickman was invited by Jason Webley, a longtime friend of hers, to participate in a collaborative project called Margaret (2014). Webley had grown interested in an unknown, nearly forgotten woman named Margaret Rucker, who was from his hometown of Everett, Washington, and who wrote poetry and lived a tragic life. He asked Rickman, Jherek Bischoff, Zac Pennington, and several others to each write and record two songs about Margaret. Webley had chosen Rickman in particular due to her love of time-worn things, such as the scrapbook of Margaret Rucker that was found in the bottom of a dumpster by Chicken John Rinaldi. Part of the arrangement was that Rickman would be allowed to use her songs from Margaret, "Lark of My Heart" and "Maker of My Sorrow", on her next album, Footnotes for the Spring.

In 2015, Eliza Rickman announced that she would be releasing her second full-length LP, entitled Footnotes for the Spring. Since the recording and release of O, You Sinners, Rickman had undergone a great deal of stress and anxiety, resulting in health and neurological issues, from perpetually living on the road, as well as being in an abusive relationship, and misogyny from venue managers and audience members. Footnotes for the Spring was originally intended to be about the American South, but owing to her experiences over the previous few years, the album's content came to reflect more her life experiences. Footnotes for the Spring was primarily recorded and arranged by Jason Webley in his studio in Everett, Washington, though much of the piano material was recorded at The Jackstraw Cultural Center in Seattle. The album was officially released on October 20, 2015.

Rickman announced in 2015 that she would be releasing an album composed of covers of various artists, entitled The Fire Went Wild. The album art and photography has already been executed, along with much of the production and arrangement. A release date has yet to be announced. The album takes its name from a lyric in the Johnny Cash and June Carter duet "Ring of Fire." On January 11, 2018, Rickman announced the release of one of her covers, "Riches and Wonders" by The Mountain Goats, performed with Jherek Bischoff, and that she intends to include it on the album; the song was featured as The Weather on the 121st episode of Welcome to Night Vale, "A Story of Love and Horror, Part 1".

=== Musical style ===
Due to her aesthetics, both in fashion and musically, Rickman has been regarded as being hard to classify. She does not feel that "singer songwriter" is a label that fits her. A term she prefers is "post-prince charming" or "the Disney princess who’s been through some shit." For example, her song Pretty Little Head has been called "disconcerting," “borderline childlike," “subliminal peculiarity," and "the feel of a nursery rhyme that’s just starting to teeter off the rails."

=== Instruments ===
Other than her standard piano, one of Rickman's signature instruments is a toy piano. Her first toy piano was a 1960s′ Schoenhut, which was purchased for her by her mother at an antique store for her 23rd birthday, though the signature pink piano used in live performances was a gift from the Schoenhut Piano Company. The antique Schoenhut was purchased as a piece of furniture, but after growing tired of transporting a large keyboard to and from live performances, she opted to use the toy piano for small-venue shows, which was well received by fans. She has since made the toy piano a staple of her live shows.

Another instrument Rickman commonly uses is the autoharp. Like her toy piano, her autoharp is antique, and she purchased it in Kansas City, Missouri. She claims she originally started to play the autoharp because it made her look like a "damsel", but has become a central instrument in her writing and performances.

Rickman and her band use and experiment with a variety of instruments, some of which are unconventional, such as wine or liquor bottles. Other instruments include the ukulele (which was introduced to her by Jason Webley), accordion, pump organ, singing wine glasses, tambourine, ratchets, children's bells, kazoo, and other noisemakers.

=== Influences ===
There are a number of musicians, performers, artists, and film directors that Eliza Rickman attributes as major influences on her music. Among the most influential are Siouxsie Sioux, Nick Cave, Andrew Bird, Elton John, The Beatles, Rufus Wainwright, Johnny Cash, Patsy Cline, Joan Baez, Édith Piaf, Kate Bush, Echo & the Bunnymen, Bryan Ferry, and the Cocteau Twins, along with Alfred Hitchcock and Tim Burton as non-musical inspirations.

=== Contributing Musicians ===
Eliza Rickman works with a number of musical artists on her albums and occasionally in live performances. The following are a few of those musicians:

- Jason Webley – accordion, percussion, vocals
- Jherek Bischoff – guitar and bass
- Robert DeLong – drums and percussion
- Lonesome Leash (Walt McClements) – accordion and percussion
- Devra Hoff – bass
- Alex Russell – violin
- Karen Hall – cello
- Alex Guy – violin and viola
- Maria Scherer Wilson – cello
- Paul Kikuchi – drums and percussion
- Fred Hawkinson – trombone
- Samantha Boshnack – trumpet
- Beth Fleenor – clarinet
- Janet Putnam – oboe
- Shenandoah Davis and Sean Nelson – background vocals

== Discography ==
=== Solo ===
- Gild the Lily (EP) (2009)
- O, You Sinners (2012)
- Footnotes for the Spring (2015)
- The Fire Went Wild (TBD)

=== Collaborations ===
- Margaret (2014), with Jason Webley and Friends
