= Margaret (album) =

Studio album by Jason Webley and Friends
- Released: December 12, 2014
- Genre: Folk
- Length: 55:06
- Label: 11 Records
- Producer: Jason Webley

Margaret is a collaborative music and multi-media project by Jason Webley and Friends. It was released on December 12, 2014 on 11 Records. It is presented in the format of a book with a compact disc. It is a concept album about Margaret Rucker, an American poet.

Contributing musical artists on the album include Jason Webley, Eliza Rickman, Shenandoah Davis, Led To Sea, Mts. & Tunnels, Jherek Bischoff, Lonesome Leash, and Zac Pennington. Scrapbook material of Margaret's was presented by "Chicken John" Rinaldi.

== The Life of Margaret Rucker Armstrong ==
Margaret Rucker was an American poet born in Everett, Washington on December 12, 1907. She was one of two children (the other was a son named Jasper) of Ruby and Bethel Rucker, a local businessman and one of the primary founders of the town. The month Margaret was born, her father and her uncle, Wyatt Rucker, began work on building the Rucker mausoleum, a 30-foot tall step pyramid in Evergreen Cemetery in honor of their widowed mother, Jane Morris Rucker.

Margaret graduated from the University of Washington in Seattle, Washington. While in college, three of her poems were published in ‘’University of Washington Poems, Third Series’’. After graduating, she married Justus Rodgers Armstrong, a Navy lieutenant, on July 18, 1931, and moved with him first to San Francisco, California, and later to Burbank, California. They had two sons -- John Rogers Armstrong and George Armstrong (1944–1993), whom she was pregnant with when she and Justus were in a car crash that left Margaret in critical condition. (Margaret and Justus's first baby, John Wyatt Armstrong, born January 18, 1936, lived only for a day. He is interred in the Rucker pyramid.)

More tragedy would occur in the family. On the 21st of April, 1950, while having coffee after dinner one evening in their Burbank home, Justus pulled out a pistol and killed himself. Margaret, the only witness, was 43 years old at the time. Eerily, it seemed that her poem “Two Deaths,” written while in college, presaged the loss of her husband, even predicting the month in which he died: "Had he left me, old, in winter,/My heart would have known less pain—/But my love left me in April/And I shan't know love again."

Margaret committed suicide herself on June 18, 1959 at the age of 51 by overdosing on sleeping pills. She was interred in the family pyramid in Everett. Her grandchildren, Rod Armstrong and Anne Armstrong, live in California.

== Creation ==
Margaret's story is preserved largely owing to a series of coincidences. The story of how her story was preserved began when "Chicken John" Rinaldi found a leather-bound scrapbook of Margaret's in a dumpster in San Francisco. He kept the scrapbook for many years and decided the best way to preserve Margaret's memory was to create a show about her, after which the audience would take pieces of the scrapbook with them, since he did not want the scrapbook to end up in another dumpster.

Some years later, musician Amanda Palmer was visiting Jason Webley in Everett and asked about the Rucker family, noticing that there were buildings, streets, and public spaces in the town named after them. Webley took Palmer to see the Rucker mausoleum in the Everett cemetery. The next day, Palmer and Webley went in San Francisco, where Webley met with Rinaldi. Rinaldi told Webley the story of the scrapbook, and showed Webley the few scanned images from the scrapbook he had. "Chicken," said Webley, "I'm pretty sure I was standing on this woman's grave 36 hours ago."

Webley was inspired to learn more about Margaret and to make Rinaldi's idea for a collaborative show about her a reality. He researched her life and poetry, and invited musicians to compose pieces inspired by the scrapbook. On April 11, 2014 Webley premiered "Margaret" at the Historic Everett Theater, featuring musical performances by a number of other artists, along with Rinaldi telling his story and showing images from the scrapbook. Later that year Webley and Rinaldi produced a book called Margaret, which includes images from the scrapbook, narratives by Rinaldi and Webley, and a compact disc of the musical performances.

== Live Performances ==
Beyond the live performance at the Historical Everett Theater on April 11, 2014, there were only a few other live performances of the concept album and presentation of images from the scrapbook. These additional performances constitute the album's release tour, which began on December 12, Margaret Rucker's birthday, in the Moore Theater, which first opened the month that Margaret was born. The performances were as follows:

Live Performances
| Date | City, State | Venue |
|---|---|---|
| April 11, 2014 | Everett, Washington | Historical Everett Theater |
| December 12, 2014 | Seattle, Washington | Moore Theater |
| December 18, 2014 | Portland, Oregon | Wonder Ballroom |
| December 19, 2014 | Eugene, Oregon | Wow Hall |
| December 20, 2014 | San Francisco, California | Castro Theater |
| December 21, 2014 | Los Angeles, California | Bootleg Theater |

== The Album and Book ==
=== Book ===
The album is accompanied by a physical hardbound book of 88 pages. It includes the following contents:

- I. Scrapbook — features the selection of poems, newspaper articles, photographs, and personal documents of Margaret Rucker, scanned from her discovered scrapbook.
- II. There's No Such Thing As Garbage by Chicken John Rinaldi — the story of how Chicken John found the scrapbook and what he decided to do about it.
- III. Lyrics — the lyrics of the songs featured on the album.
- IV. Once Upon a Pyramid by Jason Webley — the story of how Webley became interested in Margaret Rucker and the circumstances that led to the production of a show and album about her.
- V. Acknowledgements

=== CD Track Listing ===
1. "My Love Left Me In April" (Jason Webley) — 2:26
2. "Lark of My Heart" (Eliza Rickman) — 4:04
3. "Spring and Fall" (Shenandoah Davis) — 2:45
4. "Old Haunts" (Led to Sea) — 4:09
5. "Dear Margaret" (Mts. & Tunnels) — 4:14
6. "Night" (Jherek Bischoff), a poem by Margaret Rucker — 1:45
7. "Sonnet" (Shenandoah Davis) — 2:42
8. "Patches" (Led to Sea), a poem by Margaret Rucker — 4:05
9. "Maker of My Sorrow" (Eliza Rickman) — 3:09
10. "First Day" (Lonesome Leash) — 3:07
11. "Firefly" (Lonesome Leash) — 3:34
12. "Possession Sound" (Zac Pennington) — 5:21
13. "Pyramid" (Jason Webley) — 5:23
14. "My Love Left Me In April" — 4:36
15. "Eyes of Margaret" — 3:55
