= Only Murders in the Building season 2 =

Only Murders in the Building
- Season 2
- Promotional poster
- Starring: Steve Martin; Martin Short; Selena Gomez; Cara Delevingne; Adina Verson (Note: Verson is credited as starring for the final episode of the season, after being credited as recurring in all her previous appearances.)
- No. of episodes: 10

Release
- Original network: Hulu
- Original release: June 28 – August 23, 2022

Season chronology
- ← Previous; Season 1 Next → Season 3

The second season of the American mystery comedy-drama television series Only Murders in the Building, often abbreviated as OMITB, premiered on June 28, 2022, on Hulu. The series follows a trio of strangers (played by Steve Martin, Martin Short, and Selena Gomez), all with a shared interest in true crime podcasts, who become friends while investigating murders in their apartment building, and producing their own podcast about the cases.

The season adds Cara Delevingne and Adina Verson to the main cast. In September 2021, Hulu greenlit Only Murders in the Building for a second season. Filming began in December 2021 in New York City. The season consists of ten episodes, and had a two-episode premiere on June 28, 2022. It was critically acclaimed, receiving 11 nominations at the 75th Primetime Emmy Awards and one win.

== Cast and characters ==
=== Main ===
- Steve Martin as Charles-Haden Savage
  - Matthew Lamb as young Charles
- Martin Short as Oliver Putnam
  - Samuel Farnsworth as young Oliver
- Selena Gomez as Mabel Mora
  - Caroline Valencia as young Mabel
- Cara Delevingne as Alice Banks
- Adina Verson as Poppy White

=== Recurring ===
- Amy Ryan as Jan Bellows
- Michael Cyril Creighton as Howard Morris
- Da'Vine Joy Randolph as Detective Donna Williams
- Tina Fey as Cinda Canning
- Jackie Hoffman as Uma Heller
- Jayne Houdyshell as Bunny Folger
  - Houdyshell also voices Mrs. Gambolini, Bunny's pet parrot
- Nathan Lane as Teddy Dimas
- James Caverly as Theo Dimas
- Ryan Broussard as Will Putnam
- Teddy Coluca as Lester
- Vanessa Aspillaga as Ursula
- Russell G. Jones as Dr. Grover Stanley
- Jaboukie Young-White as Sam
- Daniel Oreskes as Marv
- Ali Stroker as Paulette
- Orson Hong as Grant
- Zoe Colletti as Lucy
- Michael Rapaport as Detective Daniel Kreps
- Christine Ko as Nina Lin
- Ariel Shafir as Ivan

=== Guest ===
- Andrea Martin as Joy Payne
- Jason Veasey as Jonathan Bridgecroft
- Amy Schumer as a fictionalized version of herself
- Ben Livingston as Charles's late father
- Shirley MacLaine as Rose Cooper
- Mark Consuelos as Mabel's late father
- James Caverly as Theo Dimas
- Jane Lynch as Sazz Pataki
- Paul Rudd as Ben Glenroy

== Episodes ==
No. overall	No. in season	Title	Directed by	Written by	Original release date	Prod. code
11	1	"Persons of Interest"	John Hoffman	John Hoffman & Noah Levine	June 28, 2022	2DWB01
Charles, Oliver, and Mabel are arrested and interviewed by Detective Williams and Detective Kreps before being released due to lack of evidence. Mabel suggests they follow the police's advice and stay away from the case. Later, a woman named Alice invites Mabel to an art show at a local gallery and encourages her to pursue art again. Oliver meets Amy Schumer, who has moved into Sting's apartment, and she proposes to turn the podcast into a TV series. Meanwhile, Charles is approached to play "Uncle Brazzos" in a Brazzos reboot. The trio discovers that Cinda has started a podcast about them, encouraging them to investigate to clear their names. Mabel reveals Bunny said "14" to her before she died. The trio breaks into Bunny's apartment and discovers her pet parrot mimicking Bunny. When Howard and Uma walk in, the three hide and overhear them panic over a painting missing from Bunny's apartment. Sneaking away through a hidden elevator, they return to their apartments, and Charles discovers the missing painting on his wall.
12	2	"Framed"	John Hoffman	Kristin Newman	June 28, 2022	2DWB02
Charles realizes one of the people in the painting is his father, while Mabel reveals Bunny also said "Savage" to her before she died. At Howard's invitation, the trio attends a memorial for Bunny, planning to return the painting to Bunny's apartment. There, they meet Leonora Folger, Bunny's mother and the painting's owner. Oliver and Mabel intend to sneak the painting up the hidden elevator into Bunny's apartment, planning to meet Charles outside, but Charles accidentally lets the elevator door close, locking them out. In a panic, they stash the painting near a dumpster but later find it missing. Mabel returns to the art studio, where Alice encourages her to smash art to release her emotions, and they eventually kiss. Oliver meets with Amy in her apartment and discovers that she found the painting by the dumpster and hung it on her wall. Leonora talks to Charles about the painting, causing him to remember a day from his childhood when his father was arrested. Leonora learns the painting is at Amy's but upon inspection, declares it a fake. Bunny's parrot is delivered to Oliver as per Bunny's will, and the bird says "I know who did it."
13	3	"The Last Day of Bunny Folger"	Jude Weng	Ben Smith	July 5, 2022	2DWB03
The trio tries to find out what Bunny's last day was like before she died. In a flashback, it is revealed that it was Bunny's last day as board president and that she considered moving to Florida after retiring. She received a call from a mysterious person who wanted to buy her painting, but rejected the offer. She also gave present money to her regular café server, Ivan, and easily fixed the Arconia's main elevator when she, Charles, and Mabel got stuck in it. At the end of the day, she realized how much the Arconia meant to her and decided not to retire, upsetting her successor, Nina Lin, who openly threatened her for not stepping down. Later, Bunny visited Charles, Oliver, and Mabel, offering a bottle of champagne in hopes of joining their celebration, but they thought she was just stopping by and did not invite her in. A masked and gloved figure attacked her when she returned to her apartment. The trio feels guilty that they could have saved Bunny's life "with a simple act of kindness." They realize Nina had a motive to kill Bunny, making her their prime suspect.
14	4	"Here's Looking at You"	Jude Weng	Valentina Garza & Rachel Burger	July 12, 2022	2DWB04
Lucy, the teenage daughter of Charles's ex-girlfriend, unexpectedly shows up at his apartment. She reveals to Charles, Oliver, and Mabel that she discovered secret tunnels inside the walls of the Arconia years earlier. As they walk through the tunnels, they overhear Nina and her husband agreeing that Bunny had to go so that the Arconia could be modernized. Oliver also witnesses an argument between Teddy and Theo Dimas, who have been released on parole, which makes Oliver reevaluate his relationship with his son. Later, the trio and Lucy visit Nina to get her to confess to Bunny's murder, but she goes into labor and begs them to find Bunny's killer. Lucy confesses to Charles that she ran away from home after her mother remarried. Although touched by Lucy's words that he is the best stepfather she ever had, Charles insists she go home. Before leaving, Lucy warns Charles that he is in danger, but does not tell him that she came to the Arconia on the night of Bunny's murder and saw the killer escaping through the tunnels. Charles visits Jan in prison to ask for her help.
15	5	"The Tell"	Cherien Dabis	Matteo Borghese & Rob Turbovsky	July 19, 2022	2DWB05
Jan tells Charles that the killer is possibly an artist since they composed the crime scene to frame Mabel. Charles and Oliver learn that Mabel is dating Alice, who is an artist, and become suspicious of her. At a party Alice hosts for an eclectic art crowd, Oliver proposes a murder game called Son of Sam. By the end of the game, he declares Alice the murderer and asks a multitude of probing questions, forcing her to reveal that she lied about her background and her studies so people would think she is a legitimate artist. Later, they learn that Bunny had a meeting with someone in her regular diner the day before she died about the Rose Cooper painting. Alice apologizes to Mabel for lying to her, and the two reconcile by sharing personal secrets. Meanwhile, Will takes a DNA test for his son's school project, which reveals that he has Greek ancestry despite Oliver's Irish heritage. Oliver sadly speculates that his ex-wife may have had an affair with Teddy who might be Will's biological father.
16	6	"Performance Review"	Cherien Dabis	Ben Smith & Joshua Allen Griffith	July 26, 2022	2DWB06
The trio wants Detective Williams's help with a fingerprinted matchbook they recently found, but she is on maternity leave. When they receive a text message in her name to leave their evidence in a public place, they fear it is the killer trying to get their hands on the evidence. They decide to leave a glitter bomb instead to catch the killer, but their personal problems distract them during the waiting until they miss their opportunity. Meanwhile, Cinda finds a man from Mabel's past who falsely claims that Mabel cut off one of his fingers, and she wants to use this in her podcast. Cinda's assistant, Poppy, has second thoughts about that, and reveals some hidden truths about Cinda to Mabel. Mabel goes to Alice's studio, where she finds Alice recreating the scene of Bunny's murder for an art exhibit. Heartbroken, Mabel runs off, but sees a glitter-bombed person in her subway car. Later, Charles and Oliver see an Internet video of Mabel seemingly stabbing that person.
17	7	"Flipping the Pieces"	Chris Teague	Stephen Markley & Ben Philippe	August 2, 2022	2DWB07
A series of flashbacks details Mabel's relationship with her father before his death from cancer. Following the subway incident, Mabel wakes up in Theo's apartment with no memory of the attack and her bag missing. Theo explains to her that he was in the subway car too, saw what happened, and brought Mabel home after she passed out. He shows Mabel an employee badge from Coney Island that her assailant dropped, so they go there to investigate. Mabel recovers her bag before her assailant discovers her, but finds the matchbook gone. Meanwhile, Detective Williams visits Charles and Oliver, who reveal that they have the murder knife, which they give her for analysis. After fleeing Coney Island, Mabel forgives Theo for Zoe's death and remembers the night of Bunny's murder, realizing she saw someone escaping from her apartment. Reuniting with Charles and Oliver, Mabel shows Charles a picture of Lucy she found in her bag. Fearing Lucy is the killer's next target, Charles tries to call her, but the call is cut off when a blackout hits the city.
18	8	"Hello, Darkness"	Chris Teague	Madeleine George	August 9, 2022	2DWB08
Knowing that Lucy is alone in Charles's apartment, the trio races back to the Arconia to save her from the killer. Meanwhile, the blackout forces the Arconia's residents to make new connections. Howard hangs out with one of his neighbors, whom he has a crush on, and eventually asks him out, despite the man's lethal allergy to cats. Concurrently, Lester, the doorman, helps Nina assemble a baby swing, during which Nina evaluates Lester's job and gives him a promotion. The trio discover that someone broke into Charles's apartment and chased Lucy through the secret tunnels. They later encounter Marv in the tunnels, believing he is the killer, but in reality Marv wanted to help the trio catch the killer yet unintentionally scared them away with his presence. At Marv's request, Oliver agrees to record him for a podcast episode while Lucy finally tells Charles what she saw on the night of Bunny's murder. After the power returns, the trio meets Detective Kreps in the building. Mabel notices some glitter on his neck and realizes he was her assailant.
19	9	"Sparring Partners"	Jamie Babbit	Kirker Butler	August 16, 2022	2DWB09
Mabel tries to confront Kreps about his involvement in Bunny's murder. He denies everything, but mentions his admiration for Cinda's podcasts, heightening Mabel's suspicion. Meanwhile, Charles and Oliver discover the original Rose Cooper painting hidden under the cage of Bunny's parrot. Charles further discovers that Leonora is Rose Cooper herself. She reveals to Charles that she and his father were lovers for years and he was arrested as a result of trying to defend her from her enraged husband. She also shows Charles another painting hidden in the canvas, depicting young Charles and his father. Concurrently, Oliver learns that Teddy is indeed Will's biological father, but, for Will's sake, they both decide to keep this a secret. Alice gives Mabel a jigsaw puzzle as a peace offering, and with its help, Mabel realizes that one of Cinda's podcasts mentioned a restaurant with the logo she saw on Kreps's backpack. When she questions Poppy about this, she reveals she is Becky Butler, the subject of the podcast, and that Kreps is Cinda's lover who helped Cinda provide evidence about her case. Mabel concludes that Cinda is the true mastermind behind Bunny's murder.
20	10	"I Know Who Did It"	Jamie Babbit	John Hoffman, Matteo Borghese & Rob Turbovsky	August 23, 2022	2DWB10
The trio stages a killer reveal party where they endeavor to induce Bunny's killer to confess. After failing with Cinda, Mabel declares Alice the killer, which seems to be true when Alice stabs Charles in the stomach. Cinda praises Mabel for solving the case, which makes Becky so frustrated she unwittingly reveals information only the killer would know. As Charles wakes up unharmed, the guests reveal the party was an act to expose Becky as the real killer. Detective Williams found the murder knife had Becky's DNA on it and Mabel realized Bunny said "14 Sandwich" to her, which was Becky's favorite meal at Bunny's regular diner. Becky is arrested along with Kreps, who is revealed to be Becky's lover and accomplice. Their motive was to gain recognition and a higher salary in their respective jobs by solving a premeditated murder. With the case closed, Charles gets a proper role in the Brazzos reboot; Mabel and Alice resume their relationship; and Oliver reconciles with his son, who already knows they are not biologically related. One year later, on the opening night of a Broadway play Oliver directed, the lead actor, Ben Glenroy, suddenly collapses on stage during his performance.

== Production ==
=== Development ===
On September 14, 2021, following the release of the first season, Hulu renewed the series for a ten-episode second season. Series star Selena Gomez stated that series co-creator John Hoffman had begun developing ideas for the second season towards the end of filming for the first season.

=== Casting ===
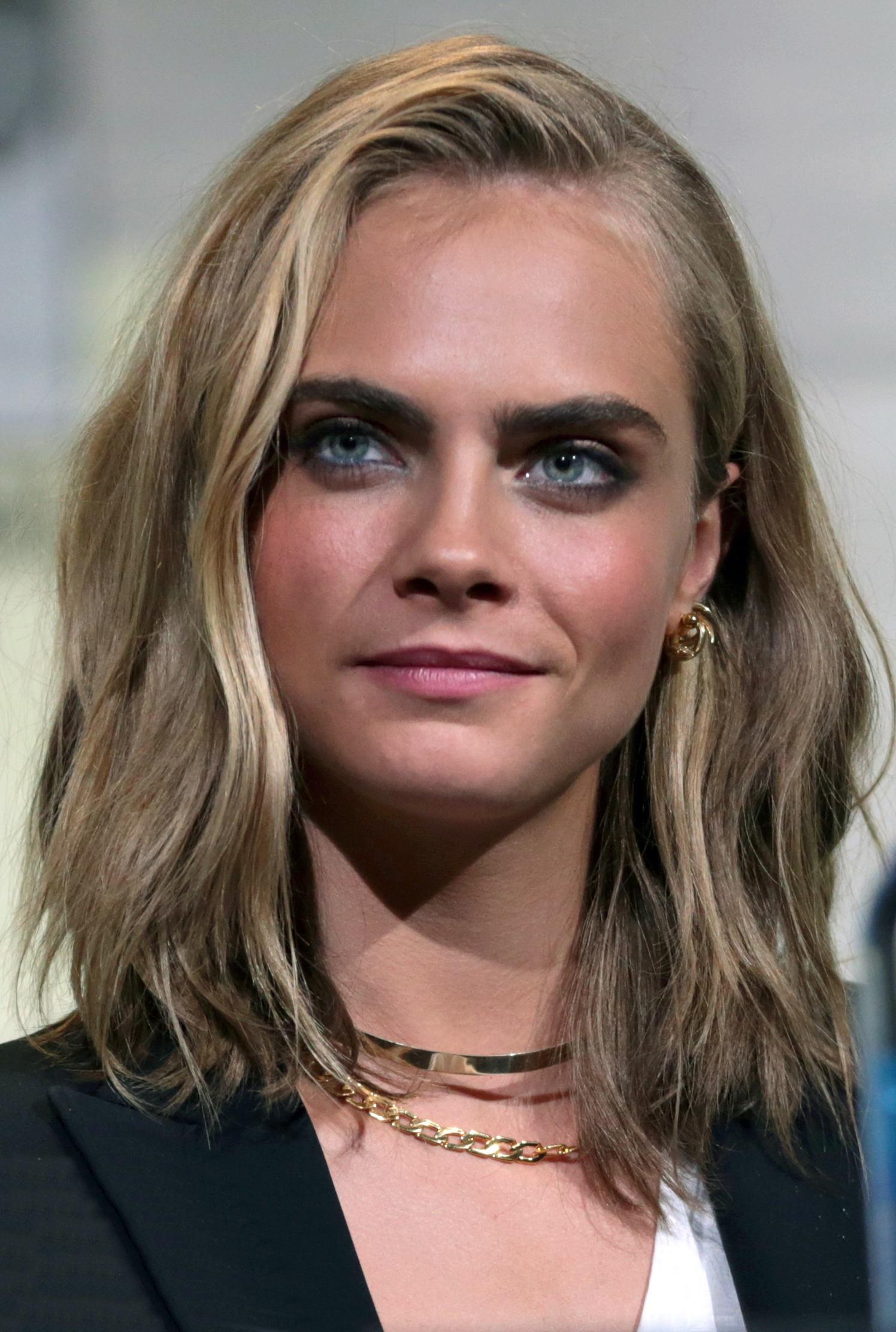
Cara Delevingne was cast as a series regular for the season.

Following the announcement of the second season, it was also announced that Steve Martin, Martin Short, and Gomez would reprise their roles. In December 2021, it was reported that Cara Delevingne joined the cast as a series regular for the season. In January 2022, Short announced that Shirley MacLaine and Amy Schumer were cast to guest star for the season. In February 2022, Michael Rapaport joined the cast in a recurring role for the season.

=== Writing ===
The episodes in the season were written by Hoffman, Noah Levine, Kristin Newman, Ben Smith, Valentina Garza, Rachel Burger, Matteo Borghese, Rob Turbovsky, Joshua Allen Griffith, Stephen Markley, Ben Philippe, Madeleine George and Kirker Butler.

=== Filming ===
Principal photography for the season began on December 1, 2021, on the Upper West Side of Manhattan, and continued through January 2022.

=== Music ===
On July 15, 2022, "Angel in Flip-Flops", an original song that was played briefly in the fourth episode of the season, "Here's Looking at You", was released online. It was performed by Martin as his character Charles-Haden Savage, and written by Martin and Butler, with Paul Shaffer as producer. An album for the season was released on August 12, 2022. The soundtrack for the season was wholly composed by Siddhartha Khosla.

No.	Title	Episode	Length
1.	"We're Back"	"Persons of Interest"	1:16
2.	"Precinct Hang"	"Persons of Interest"	1:46
3.	"I Dream of Cinda"	"Persons of Interest"	1:50
4.	"A Death Threat"	"Persons of Interest"	1:15
5.	"Murder Board Suite"	"Persons of Interest"	1:57
6.	"Bunny's Painting"	"Persons of Interest"	1:29
7.	"History of the Arconia"	"Framed"	2:30
8.	"Vantage, in Paris"	"Framed"	4:47
9.	"Poor Lil' Bunny Rabbit"	"The Last Day of Bunny Folger"	3:04
10.	"Texting Lucy"	"Here's Looking at You"	1:49
11.	"Howard and the Knife Above His Head"	"Here's Looking at You"	1:43
12.	"Lucy Lurkin'"	"Here's Looking at You"	1:23
13.	"Son of Sam"	"The Tell"	2:17
14.	"Worse Than Watergate"	"The Tell"	3:01
15.	"Admission"	"The Tell"	1:11
16.	"Glitter"	"Performance Review"	1:40
17.	"Mabel's Dream"	"Flipping the Pieces"	3:31
18.	"Puzzled"	"Flipping the Pieces"	2:05
19.	"Flashback"	"Flipping the Pieces"	3:25
20.	"The Chase"	"Flipping the Pieces"	1:29
21.	"Gone Missing"	"I Know Who Did It"	2:20
22.	"What Lucy Saw"	"Hello, Darkness"	2:17
23.	"The Boxer's Lover"	"Sparring Partners"	3:53
24.	"You Gotta Be Kidding Me"	"I Know Who Did It"	0:57
Total length:			52:58

== Release ==
The second season premiered on June 28, 2022, on Hulu. Subsequent episodes released weekly until the season finale on August 23, 2022.

== Reception ==
=== Audience viewership ===
According to Parrot Analytics, which looks at consumer engagement in consumer research, streaming, downloads, and on social media, the second season of Only Murders in the Building was the third-most in-demand streaming original series in the U.S. during the week of August 13 to 19, 2022, as well as during the week of August 20 to 26. According to Whip Media's viewership tracking app TV Time, it was the most-streamed TV series across all U.S. platforms during the week ending August 7, 2022, and during the week of August 28. According to the streaming aggregator JustWatch, it was the third-most streamed TV series across all U.S. platforms during the week ending July 3, 2022.

=== Critical response ===
For the second season, the review aggregator website Rotten Tomatoes reported a 97% approval rating with an average rating of 8/10, based on 119 critic reviews. The website's critics consensus states, "Only Murders in the Building gets a new lease on life with a knottier sophomore outing that retains the series' core charm and wit." Metacritic gave the second season a weighted average score of 79 out of 100 based on 25 critic reviews, signifying "generally favorable" reviews.

=== Accolades ===
The second season received 11 nominations at the 75th Primetime Emmy Awards, with one win in a technical category. Notable nominations included Outstanding Comedy Series, Martin Short for Outstanding Lead Actor in a Comedy Series, Nathan Lane for Outstanding Guest Actor in a Comedy Series, and one nomination for Outstanding Writing for a Comedy Series.
