= Against the Night =

Studio album by Jason Webley
- Released: 1999
- Genre: Folk
- Length: 61:59
- Label: 11 Records
- Producer: Jason Webley

Jason Webley chronology
Viaje (1998)	Against the Night (1999)	Counterpoint (2002)

Professional ratings
Review scores
Source	Rating
Allmusic	4/5 stars

Against the Night is the second album, released originally in 1999, by Jason Webley. It was re-released by Springman Records in 2003. He has been known to regard it as his depressing album, "the soundtrack to a subtle apocalypse." It is his most popular album to date, and Webley regards it as the album where he really comes into his own as a songwriter.

The track "Last Song" appeared in the ninth episode of the podcast Welcome to Night Vale, titled "PYRAMID".

== Track listing ==
1. "Against the Night" – 4:41
2. "2 am" – 2:19
3. "Entropy" – 1:24
4. "Winter" – 4:05
5. "Devil be Good" – 2:54
6. "Jack of Spades" – 1:55
7. "Dance While the Sky Crashes Down" – 4:29
8. "Ontogeny" – 2:15
9. "Again the Night" – 3:40
10. "Millennium Bug" – 4:02
11. "Constellation Prize" – 2:12
12. "Absinthe Makes the Heart Grow Fonder" – 5:23
13. "Eleutheria" – 4:59
14. "Captain, Where are We Going Now?" – 5:17
15. "Back to the Garden" – 4:01
16. "Last Song" – 6:05
17. "Lullaby" – 2:18

== Personnel ==
- Performed by Jason Webley.
- Drums on "Ontogeny", "Constellation Prize", and "Back to the Garden" by Michael McQuilken.
- Electric guitar on "Back to the Garden" by John Osebold.
- Screaming on "2 am" recorded at the Blue Moon Tavern.
- Additional vocals on "Eleutheria" by Lauryn Cook's alternative tribe, and on "Back to the Garden" by John Banfill, Ben Dunlap, Jeff Harms, and Grant Mandarino.
