= Only Murders in the Building season 1 =

Season of television series

Only Murders in the Building
- Season 1
- Promotional poster
- Starring: Steve Martin; Martin Short; Selena Gomez; Aaron Dominguez; Amy Ryan
- No. of episodes: 10

Release
- Original network: Hulu
- Original release: August 31 – October 19, 2021

Season chronology
- Next → Season 2

The first season of the American mystery comedy-drama television series Only Murders in the Building, often abbreviated as OMITB, premiered on August 31, 2021, on Hulu. The series follows a trio of strangers (played by Steve Martin, Martin Short, and Selena Gomez), all with a shared interest in true crime podcasts, who become friends while investigating murders in their apartment building, and producing their own podcast about the cases. The season also stars Aaron Dominguez and Amy Ryan.

In January 2020, Hulu greenlit Only Murders in the Building for a straight-to-series order. Filming for the season began in December 2020, and wrapped in April 2021. The season consists of ten episodes, and had a three-episode premiere on August 31, 2021. The season became the most-watched comedy premiere in Hulu's history.

The season received critical acclaim. It received 17 nominations at the 74th Primetime Emmy Awards, with three wins. It also received the Seal of Authentic Representation from the Ruderman Family Foundation and The ReFrame Stamp for hiring people of underrepresented gender identities, and of color.

== Cast and characters ==
=== Main ===
- Steve Martin as Charles-Haden Savage
- Martin Short as Oliver Putnam
- Selena Gomez as Mabel Mora
  - Madeleine Valencia as young Mabel
- Aaron Dominguez as Oscar Torres
- Amy Ryan as Jan Bellows

=== Recurring ===
- Michael Cyril Creighton as Howard Morris
- Julian Cihi as Tim Kono
- Da'Vine Joy Randolph as Detective Donna Williams
- Tina Fey as Cinda Canning
- Jackie Hoffman as Uma Heller
- Jayne Houdyshell as Bunny Folger
- Nathan Lane as Teddy Dimas
- James Caverly as Theo Dimas
- Ryan Broussard as Will Putnam
- Teddy Coluca as Lester
- Vanessa Aspillaga as Ursula
- Russell G. Jones as Dr. Grover Stanley
- Jaboukie Young-White as Sam
- Daniel Oreskes as Marv
- Ali Stroker as Paulette
- Orson Hong as Grant
- Zainab Jah as Ndidi Idoko
- Maulik Pancholy as Arnav Kapoor
- Olivia Reis as Zoe Cassidy

=== Guest ===
- Jane Lynch as Sazz Pataki
- Adriane Lenox as Roberta Putnam
- Sting as a fictionalized version of himself
- Roy Wood Jr. as Vaughn
- Jacob Ming-Trent as Lucian
- Jimmy Fallon as himself
- Mandy Gonzalez as Silvia Mora
- Adina Verson as Poppy White

== Episodes ==
No. overall	No. in season	Title	Directed by	Written by	Original release date	Prod. code
1	1	"True Crime"	Jamie Babbit	Steve Martin & John Hoffman	August 31, 2021	1DWB01
Charles-Haden Savage, a misanthropic semi-retired actor who starred in the 1990s crime drama TV series Brazzos; Oliver Putnam, an ambitious but struggling Broadway director; and Mabel Mora, a young artist and apartment renovator, live at the Arconia apartment complex in Manhattan. By chance, the three meet on an elevator, joined by Tim Kono. That night, after evacuating the building for an alarm, they bond over their shared love of a certain true crime podcast. They learn that there was a death at the Arconia and sneak back inside, where they find Tim murdered. The investigators believe it was suicide, but the three think otherwise. They find more evidence, such as Tim's frantic phone call in the elevator and a package addressed to him that contained an engagement ring. Meanwhile, Oliver struggles with his relationship with his son Will, as Charles discusses his need for solitude. Mabel expresses her fear of getting personal with people. They start a podcast titled Only Murders in the Building as they continue to investigate. An old photo is shown of Mabel and the friends she dubbed "My Hardy Boys", which includes Tim. Note: The episode begins with a flash-forward set two months after the trio's first meeting, in which Charles and Oliver find Mabel kneeling over a dead body.
2	2	"Who Is Tim Kono?"	Jamie Babbit	Kirker Butler	August 31, 2021	1DWB02
Charles and Oliver try to learn more about who Tim was, and along with Mabel they attend a memorial service for him. Tim was unpopular among many Arconia residents and had several complaints filed against him. The three go into Tim's apartment to find more clues, but their lack of trust in one another makes things tense. Mabel privately records a video that reveals she has known Tim since they were children, bonding over The Hardy Boys books and solving pretend mysteries together. As they grew older, they added new friends Oscar and Zoe. One night, 10 years earlier, the four attended a New Year's Eve party on the roof of the building, and Zoe was later found dead. As he and Zoe had been arguing earlier in the evening, Oscar was arrested for her murder, but Tim told Mabel that he had seen someone else fighting with Zoe before she died. He did not disclose this to the police, causing a rift between him and Mabel. Later, Mabel revisits Tim's apartment and finds a cache of jewelry.
3	3	"How Well Do You Know Your Neighbors?"	Gillian Robespierre	Ben Smith	August 31, 2021	1DWB03
Oliver uses his theater director skills to find the prime suspect in the investigation, which leads them to their cat-loving neighbor, Howard. They find his cat's paw prints in Tim's blood, but upon a visit they discover Howard has vasovagal syncope, making it impossible for him to be a cold-blooded murderer. Board president Bunny Folger threatens to evict Oliver if he does not pay his building fees. He goes to his old associate Teddy Dimas, begging for money; after initially refusing, Teddy agrees to sponsor the podcast. Charles meets Jan, a professional bassoonist, and Mabel suggests that he ask her out. Oliver sees Sting in the elevator, and thinks he may also be a suspect. Mabel comes across a note from Tim detailing a meeting in one week with somebody identified only as "G.M.". Oliver discovers a threatening note on his door and that Winnie, his bulldog, has been poisoned, presumably by the same perpetrator.
4	4	"The Sting"	Gillian Robespierre	Kristin Newman	September 7, 2021	1DWB04
Oliver suspects that Sting poisoned Winnie and enlists the help of Charles and Mabel to prove he is guilty of both Winnie's poisoning and Tim's murder. After consulting Cinda Canning, the host of their favorite podcast, the trio present Sting with a turkey and question him about Tim, revealed to be Sting's former stockbroker. Sting guiltily confesses that, after Tim lost a substantial sum of his money, he angrily fired Tim and told him to kill himself, but is relieved when the trio announce that they believe Tim's death was murder, not suicide. Meanwhile, Charles goes on a date with Jan. It is a disaster, but she agrees to a second date when Charles later shares a personal story with her. Mabel finds out that "G.M." is actually a place called "Gus Montrose's Gems", and Oliver's son, Will, reveals that he remembers Mabel from their youth and her connection to Tim. A flash forward to a few months later reveals that Charles, Oliver, and Mabel are the subject of Cinda Canning's new podcast, Only Murderers in the Building.
5	5	"Twist"	Don Scardino	Thembi L. Banks	September 14, 2021	1DWB05
Mabel is being followed by a mysterious person, who turns out to be her old friend Oscar, recently released from prison after he was wrongly convicted of the murder of Zoe. He offers to drive her wherever she is going, and Mabel directs him to Bayport, New York, on Long Island. Charles and Oliver see Mabel leaving the Arconia with a stranger, so they follow her with the help of a horticulture podcast's hosts, who have heard about their podcast. Charles and Oliver catch up with Mabel, who finally admits that she knew Tim. Gus Montrose's Gems is revealed to be a tattoo parlor that was a contact point of a black-market jewelry dealer named "Angel". They learn there that Tim had been trying to take Angel down for years, which is why he collected the jewels in his apartment. Oscar admits that he is "Tie-Dye Guy", someone Charles saw during the evacuation of the building, but claims that he did not murder Tim; he was, however, outside Tim's door when he heard a gunshot.
6	6	"To Protect and Serve"	Don Scardino	Madeleine George & Kim Rosenstock	September 21, 2021	1DWB06
Oscar and Mabel appear to have feelings for each other. Mabel's mother does not want her involved in Tim's murder investigation, but Mabel asserts her independence on this matter. Meanwhile, Detective Williams discovers the growing popularity of the Only Murders in the Building podcast and starts having second thoughts about closing Tim's case so quickly. While dealing with the pressure of the arrival of her and her wife's first child, she decides to send Tim's phone to Mabel to help their investigation. Cinda Canning appears on Jimmy Fallon's show, openly mocking the podcast, but Teddy is thrilled that his business is mentioned on Fallon's show. He writes Charles and Oliver a check for $50,000 for more episodes. Charles notices that the check is drawn from an "Angel" account, making Teddy the black market dealer Tim was after.
7	7	"The Boy from 6B"	Cherien Dabis	Stephen Markley & Ben Philippe	September 28, 2021	1DWB07
Teddy's son Theo spies on the trio and breaks in to take photos of their board of suspects, relaying to his father that the podcast is on to them, but Teddy dismisses the concerns. Charles and Mabel break into Teddy's apartment and discover a secret room of urns from a funeral home. Later, Oliver and Mabel leave to investigate the funeral home, while Charles has a date with Jan. At the funeral home, the two discover a secret room with jewelry. Theo is working there and stealing items off the bodies, and soon notices Oliver and Mabel. Flashbacks reveal that Theo had a crush on Zoe, who communicated with him in ASL. Theo saw Zoe stealing a ring from Teddy's apartment, which Teddy noticed during the New Year's Eve party. After an argument, Theo and Zoe got into a scuffle that led to Zoe falling off the roof by accident. Tim was the only witness, but an implied death threat from Teddy silenced him. Back in the present, Theo has kidnapped Oliver and Mabel, driving them to an unknown location, but not before they send texts to Charles telling him the password to Tim's phone might be "Theo". Note: There is only one audible dialogue throughout this episode. The rest of the scenes are either shown from Theo's perspective or present situations where the characters stay quiet.
8	8	"Fan Fiction"	Cherien Dabis	Matteo Borghese & Rob Turbovsky	October 5, 2021	1DWB08
Teddy returns Mabel and Oliver to the Arconia on the condition that they end the podcast and absolve the Dimas family of suspicion. Back at the building, Mabel and Oliver are swarmed by fans of the podcast calling themselves "the Arconiacs". Detective Williams suggests the trio release all their evidence on the podcast. Oscar shares that Tim already had Zoe's green ring when he died and was planning on using it as evidence, although its whereabouts are unknown. Oliver invites the Arconiacs to help the group solve Tim's murder in time for their abrupt series finale. Charles is distracted by Jan, so Mabel and Oliver force her out of the investigation. Jan returns to her apartment, where she finds a note on the door that reads: "I'm watching you". The podcast finale premieres, complete with evidence of the Dimases' crimes. Williams doubts the Dimases' involvement in the murder when Tim's autopsy reveals death by poisoning. Security footage also proves Teddy and Theo were not in the building at the time of Tim's murder. Charles visits Jan's apartment, where he finds her unconscious and bleeding.
9	9	"Double Time"	Jamie Babbit	John Hoffman & Kristin Newman	October 12, 2021	1DWB09
On their podcast, the trio retract their accusation of Teddy and Theo in Tim's murder. Jan survives her stabbing and Charles helps with her recovery. Charles's former stunt double, Sazz Pataki, shows up and immediately jumps into helping the trio investigate, much to the dismay of Charles and Jan. Later, a building meeting is called to address the podcast and the building votes to evict the trio, even after Charles says the podcast is done. Oliver and Mabel try to find a new lead to convince Charles to stay on the investigation and speculate that Tim might have had a secret girlfriend, a theory seemingly confirmed by Tim's neighbor. Charles goes to Jan's concert at Sazz's urging and sees a young female bassoonist who has replaced Jan at first chair. At the same time, Oliver and Mabel find a bassoon cleaner among Tim's stash of sex toys.
10	10	"Open and Shut"	Jamie Babbit	John Hoffman & Rachel Burger	October 19, 2021	1DWB10
The trio realize that Jan is the murderer. Having been romantically involved with Tim, she killed him a day after they broke up. Mabel and Oliver break into Jan's apartment and find evidence, including a poison bottle, Zoe's ring, and a bloody knife she used to stab herself to deflect suspicion. As Charles confronts Jan, he realizes she has poisoned him. Jan tries to gas the whole building via the newly open fireplaces, but the trio run to the basement and stop it. Jan appears and threatens to shoot them. A scuffle ensues, ending with Mabel knocking Jan out with the emerald ring. Jan is arrested while Charles is treated by paramedics. Days later, as the trio celebrate, Mabel goes to get more champagne, and Oliver and Charles receive a mysterious text message telling them to leave the building. The scene that opened the series is repeated, as Oliver and Charles run to Mabel and find her hunched over Bunny's dead body, covered in blood. The trio is led out of the Arconia in handcuffs while the Arconia tenants and others, including Detective Williams, Oscar, and Cinda, watch.

== Production ==
=== Development ===
Co-creator and star Steve Martin conceived of the idea for Only Murders in the Building decades before its premiere. His original idea involved three elderly men who discover that they are all obsessed with solving crimes, but are too old and tired to go outside, so they decide to solve crimes that are only in the building. The idea later developed with one of the old men changed to a younger woman.

In January 2020, it was announced Hulu had greenlit a straight-to-series order for a then untitled half-hour serialized comedy created by Martin and John Hoffman, with Martin, Martin Short, and Hoffman as executive producers, alongside Dan Fogelman, with 20th Television serving as the studio.

=== Casting ===
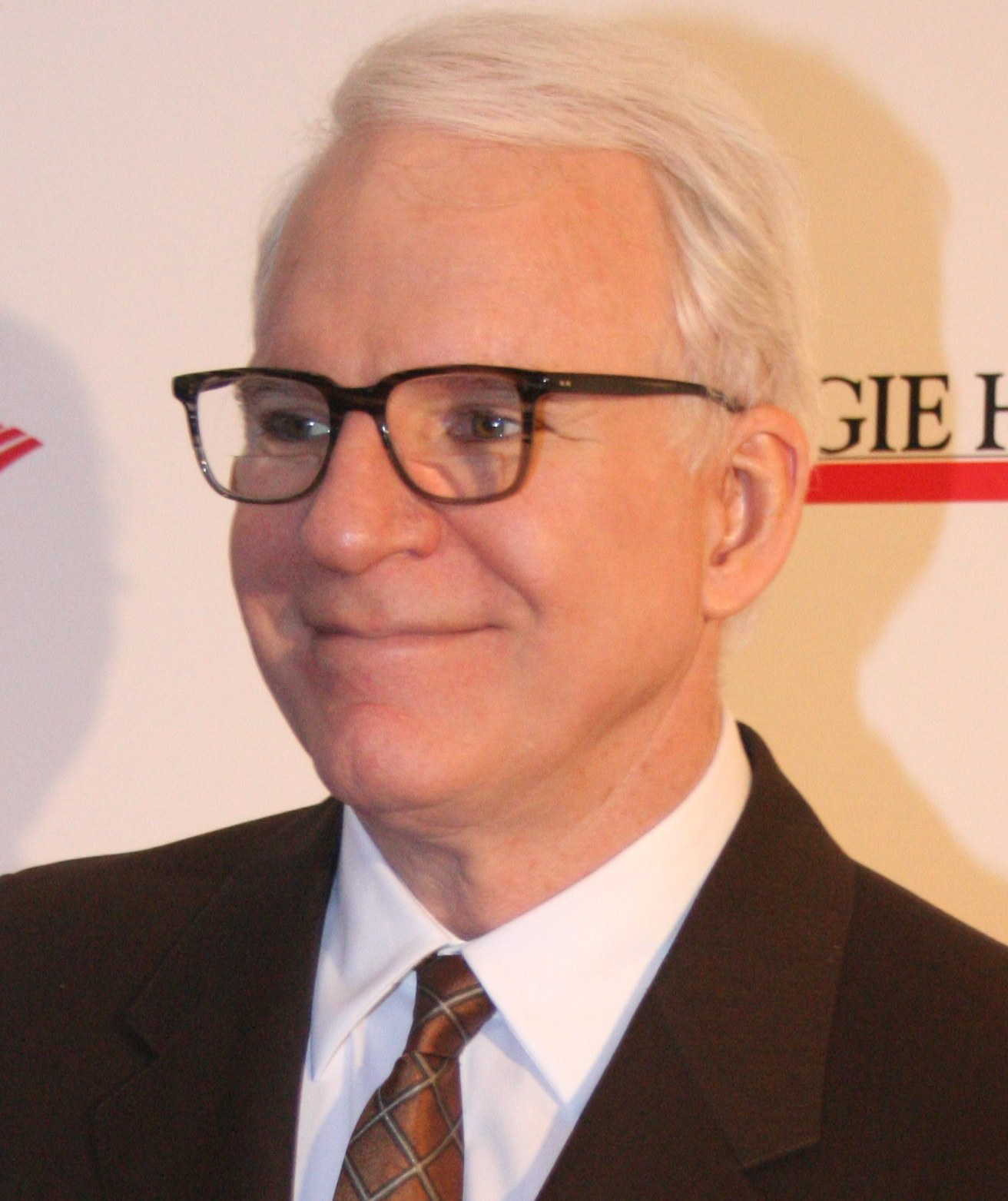
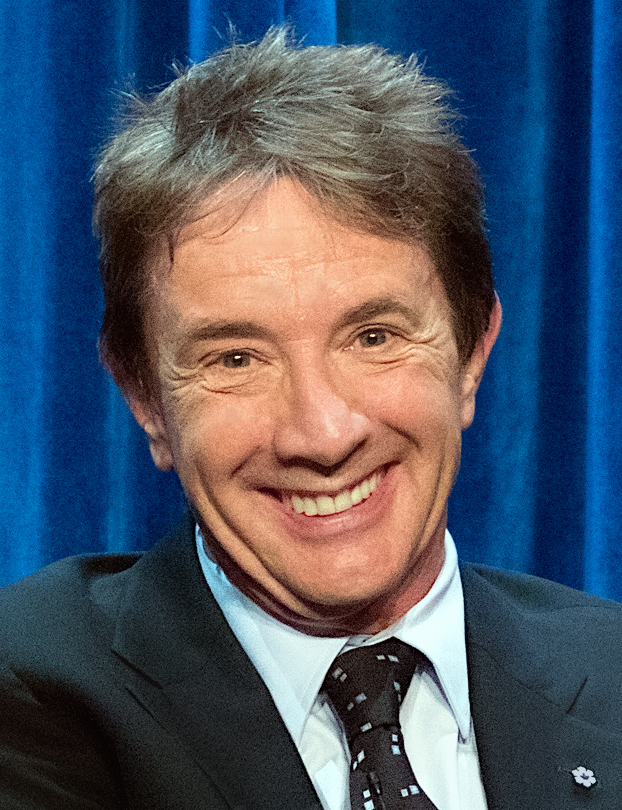
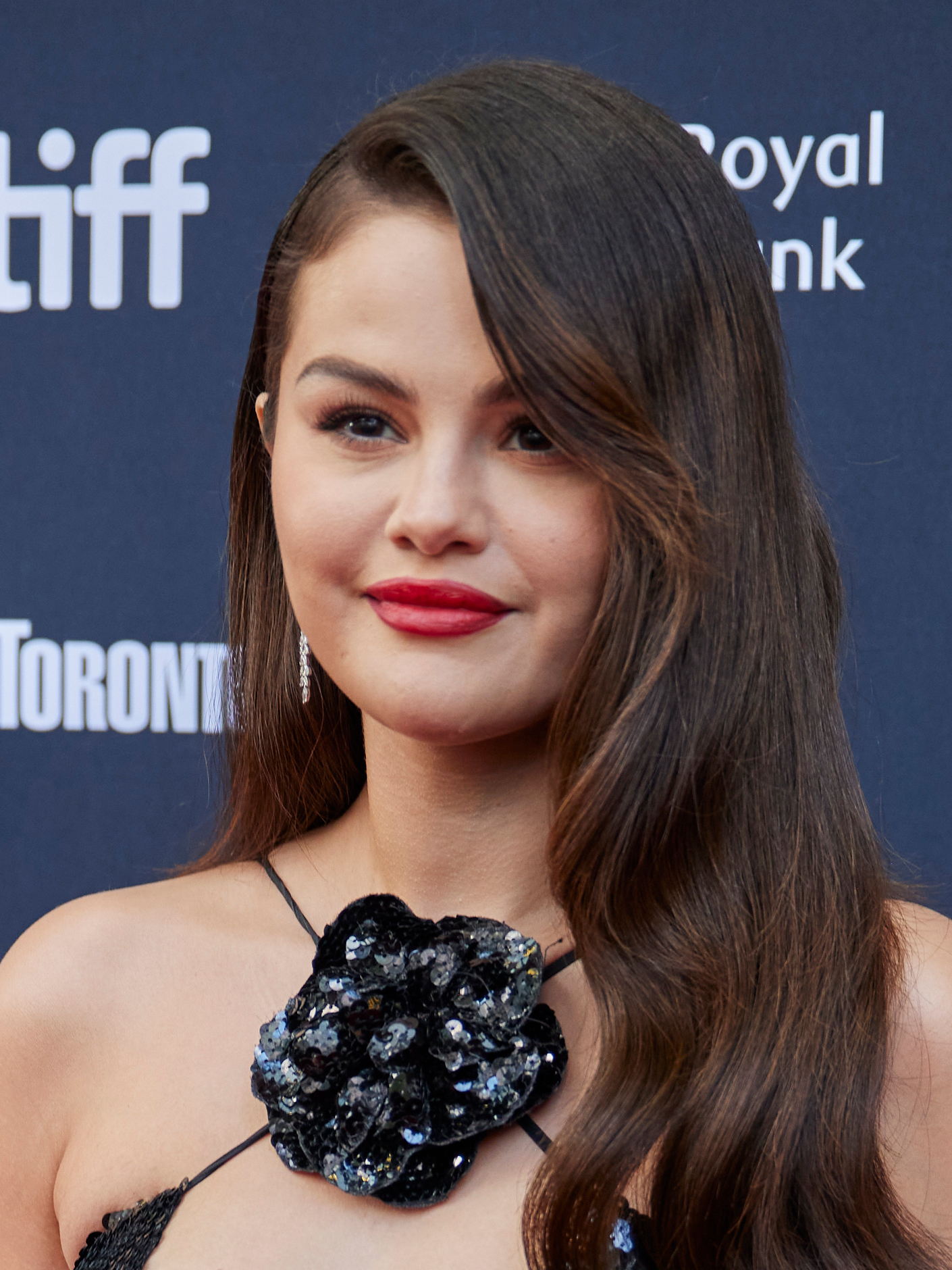
Steve Martin, Martin Short and Selena Gomez receive top billing for the season, and, respectively, portray Charles, Oliver and Mabel.

Alongside the initial announcement, it was announced Martin and Short would star in the series. In August 2020, Selena Gomez joined the cast as the series' third main lead, and also serves as an executive producer. In November 2020, Aaron Dominguez joined the cast in a series regular role, confirmed to be playing the character of Oscar. In January 2021, Amy Ryan joined the cast in a series regular role and Nathan Lane joined the cast in a recurring role. In addition to the main cast, the season also features multiple guest stars, such as Tina Fey, Jackie Hoffman and Da'Vine Joy Randolph. Sting appears as a fictionalized version of himself.

=== Writing ===
The pilot episode was written by co-creators Martin and Hoffman, with Hoffman also co-writing the final two episodes of the season. The rest of the episodes in the season were written by Kirker Butler, Ben Smith, Kristin Newman, Thembi L. Banks, Madeleine George, Kim Rosenstock, Stephen Markley, Ben Philippe, Matteo Borghese, Rob Turbovsky and Rachel Burger.

=== Filming ===
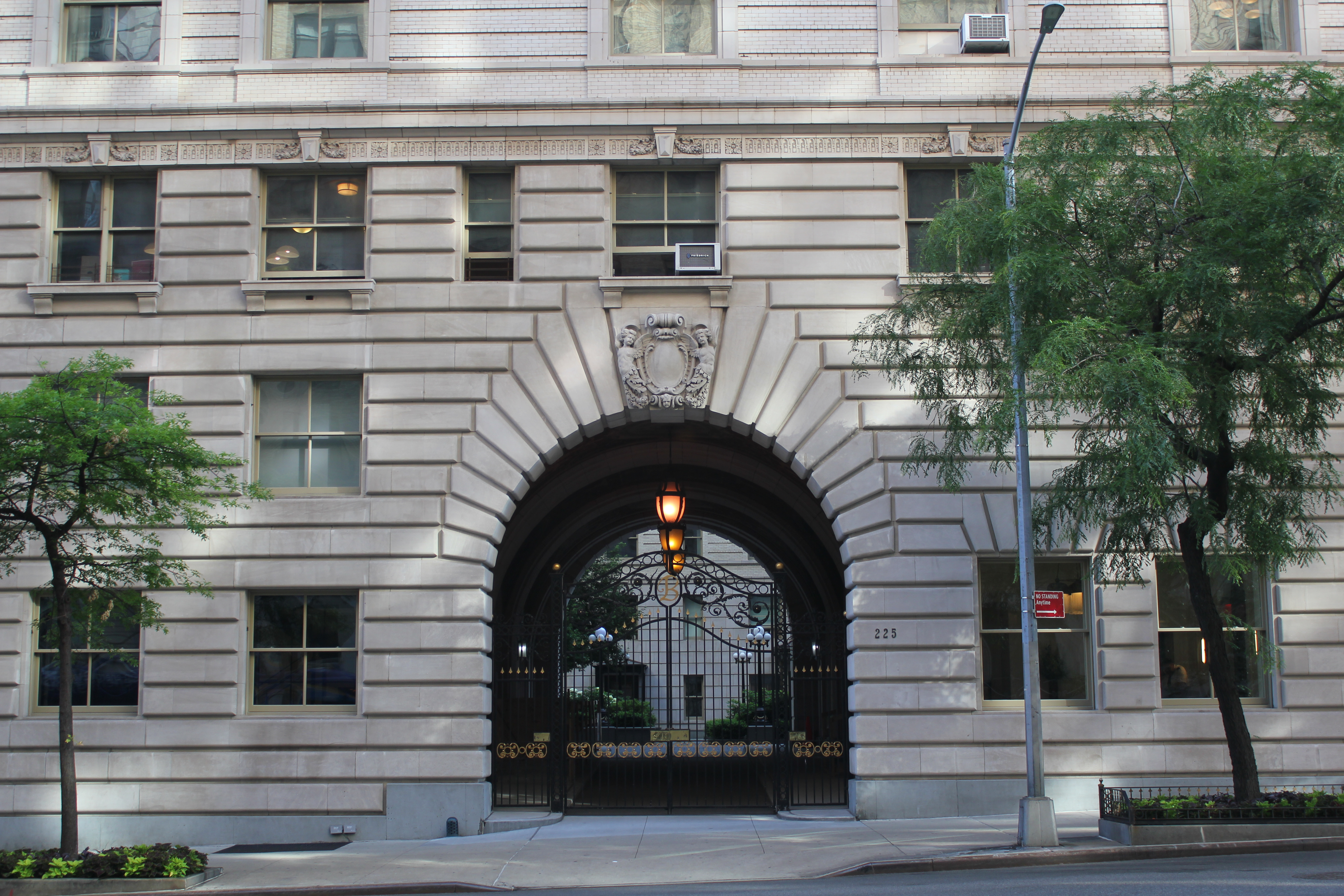
The Belnord on West 86th Street on the Upper West Side is used for exterior shots of the fictional Arconia apartment building.

Principal photography for the season began on December 3, 2020, in New York City. Filming concluded in April 2021. The Belnord was used for exterior shots of the Arconia, the fictional apartment building featured in the series.

=== Music ===
The soundtrack for the season was wholly composed by Siddhartha Khosla. A digital album for the score was released on August 27, 2021, four days before the season's debut.

No.	Title	Length
1.	"Main Title"	0:51
2.	"Mission Theme Pt. 1"	1:11
3.	"Arconia Elevator Theme"	0:37
4.	"Frozen Cat"	0:46
5.	"Aphrodite"	1:43
6.	"Vantage"	1:44
7.	"All Is Not Okay"	0:39
8.	"Oliver's Monologue"	1:57
9.	"Who Was Tim Kono"	3:21
10.	"Podcast Theme (Punk Version)"	1:24
11.	"Romantic Theme Pt. 1"	1:03
12.	"Romantic Theme Pt. 2"	1:31
13.	"Interrogation Fantasy Pt. 1"	0:56
14.	"Interrogation Fantasy Pt. 2"	0:45
15.	"Detective"	1:22
16.	"Mabel and Tim"	1:55
17.	"Pilot Ending"	1:43
18.	"Jan"	1:30
19.	"Charles"	1:16
20.	"Mission Theme Pt. 2"	1:02
21.	"Finale"	5:19
Total length:		34:03

== Release ==
The season premiered on August 31, 2021, with the first three episodes on Hulu. Subsequent episodes released weekly until the season finale on October 19, 2021. Disney+ Hotstar released the series in select territories on September 3, 2021. The first season made its broadcast television premiere on ABC on January 2, 2024; episodes were edited to meet broadcast standards and practices and follow FCC rules.

== Reception ==
=== Audience viewership ===
On September 3, 2021, it was reported that the first season of Only Murders in the Building set a record for the most-watched comedy premiere in Hulu's history. On October 28, 2021, Hulu Originals president Craig Erwich said in an interview with Vulture that the season had become the most-watched comedy ever on Hulu "by a good measure." In the same article, Vulture reported that, according to Parrot Analytics, the season went from having around 16 times the audience demand in the U.S. as an average show when it debuted on August 31 to generating 37 times typical demand by the time the season finale dropped on October 19. After the finale, the season was ranked 14th on the list of most in-demand shows in the U.S. and signaled a "massive" 135% growth rate. According to the streaming aggregator JustWatch, the first season of Only Murders in the Building was the most-streamed television series across all U.S. platforms during the week ending October 24, 2021, and second during the week ending October 31, 2021.

=== Critical response ===
The review aggregator website Rotten Tomatoes reported a 100% approval rating with an average rating of 8/10, based on 108 critic reviews for the season. The website's critics consensus reads, "Only Murders in the Building's silly approach to true crime obsessives is at once hilarious and insightful, thanks in large part to its extremely charming central trio." Metacritic gave the season a weighted average score of 76 out of 100 based on 34 critic reviews, indicating "generally favorable" reviews.

Kristen Baldwin of Entertainment Weekly gave the season a "B" grade and wrote, "Only Murders delivers above-average laughs, a clever mystery, and a starry cast. But it's hard to shake the feeling that the show missed an opportunity to be something special." Reviewing for Rolling Stone, Alan Sepinwall gave a rating of four and a half out of five stars for the season, and said "The series soon turns out to be—like The Princess Bride, Galaxy Quest, or Jane the Virgin—that rare and wonderful thing: the parody that also offers a great example of the genuine article."

=== Accolades ===
The first season received 17 nominations at the 74th Primetime Emmy Awards, with three wins, including Nathan Lane for Outstanding Guest Actor in a Comedy Series. Notable nominations included, Outstanding Comedy Series, Steve Martin and Martin Short for Outstanding Lead Actor in a Comedy Series, Jamie Babbit and Cherien Dabis for Outstanding Directing for a Comedy Series, and Martin and John Hoffman for Outstanding Writing for a Comedy Series.

"The Boy from 6B", the seventh episode of the season, was given the Seal of Authentic Representation from the Ruderman Family Foundation for the portrayal of Theo by James Caverly, as an actor with a disability and at least five lines of dialogue. The season was additionally recognized with The ReFrame Stamp for hiring people of underrepresented gender identities, and of color.
