= Andru =

Andru is a given name and surname.

== Surname ==
- John Andru (1932–2003), Canadian fencer
- Ross Andru (1927–1993), American comics artist and editor

== Given name ==
- Andru Bemis, American musician
- Andru Branch (born 1968), Canadian reggae musician
- Andru Donalds (born 1974), Jamaican musician and vocalist
- Andru Phillips (born 2001), American football player
- Andru Volinsky (born 1956), American politician, attorney, and social justice advocate
