= Cistern (disambiguation) =

A cistern is a water storage tank.

Cistern may also refer to:

- Cistern (album), a 2016 album by Jherek Bischoff
- Cistern, Texas, a village in Texas
- Cisterna, in the Golgi apparatus and endoplasmic reticulum
- Cisternerne, a museum and water reservoir in Copenhagen
- Maitland Monument, Corfu, known locally as the Cistern
- Subarachnoid cisterns, in the meninges of the brain
- The Cistern, a public space at Buffalo Bayou Park in Houston, Texas
- "The Cistern", a short story by Ray Bradbury written in 1947

== See also ==
- Cisterna (disambiguation)
- Cistern Field, an airport in Cistern Cay, the Bahamas
- Cittern
- La Cisterna, Chile
- List of Roman cisterns
- Sistan, an area split between east Iran and west Afghanistan
- Sistine Chapel
- Syston, a civil parish in Leicestershire, England
