= Cisterna (disambiguation) =

A Cisterna is a flattened membrane disk that makes up the Golgi apparatus, or one of the flattened membrane-enclosed sacs or tubes of the endoplasmic reticulum.

Cisterna may also refer to:

- Cisterna d'Asti, an Italian municipality in the Province of Asti
- Cisterna di Latina, an Italian municipality in the Province of Latina
  - Battle of Cisterna, 1944
- Castello di Cisterna, an Italian municipality in the Province of Naples
- Piazza della Cisterna, one of the main squares of San Gimignano, Italy
- La Cisterna, a place in Chile

== See also ==
- Cistern, a receptacle for holding liquids, usually water
- Cistern (neuroanatomy), an opening in the subarachnoid space of the brain
- Cistern (disambiguation)
