= Elephant Elephant =

EP by Evelyn Evelyn
- Released: September 13, 2007
- Recorded: 2007
- Genre: Americana / Showtunes
- Label: Eleven Records
- Producers: Amanda Palmer; Jason Webley

Evelyn Evelyn chronology
Elephant Elephant (2007)	Evelyn Evelyn (2010)

The Elephant Elephant EP is the debut release by Evelyn Evelyn. It was first sold to the public on September 13, 2007, and consists of a 3-song 7" single and a 6-track "bonus" CD (as well as a sticker of a conjoined elephant).

The vinyl has full fidelity, while the online/streaming and CD versions of the songs have been run through computer filters to create the sound of an old-time radio transcription. However, the song "Elephant Elephant" is the same on in all variations. "Have You Seen My Sister Evelyn?" appears online and as part of "Goodnight Evelyn" on the CD version. All of the other tracks are exclusive to their particular formats. "Love Will Tear Us Apart", "Elephant Elephant" and "Have You Seen My Sister Evelyn?" appear on their self-titled 2010 debut album, and vocals are added to the instrumental tracks "Evelyn Evelyn Theme" and "Sandy's Theme" (retitled as Sandy Fishnets), all of which were re-recorded for the album.

== Track listing ==
=== Vinyl ===
Side A

1. "Elephant Elephant" – 1:43
2. "Have You Seen My Sister Evelyn?" – 2:15

Side B

1. "Love Will Tear Us Apart" (Joy Division) – 2:52

=== "Bonus" CD ===
1. "Elephant Elephant" – 1:43
2. "Evelyn Evelyn Theme" – 3:35
3. "Sandy's Theme" – 5:14
4. "Medley" – 4:46
5. "Eleven Elephant Elephants" – 13:32
6. "Goodnight Evelyn" – 1:08 (with 7:52 of silence)
7. "Have You Seen My Sister Evelyn?" (Hidden Track) - 2:11
