= VanFest =

Music festival

- Genre: Rock, punk rock, pop, alternative rock, hip hop
- Dates: August
- Locations: Maple Valley, Washington, United States
- Years active: 2011–2017
- Founders: Van Wolfe
- Website: vanfestnw.org (defunct)

VanFest is an annual music festival which took place in Maple Valley, Washington, United States. It was founded in 2011 as a grassroots project by namesake Van Wolfe, who was a student at Tahoma Senior High School at the time and described in The Stranger as a "superhuman". The event series, featuring largely Pacific Northwest local bands, benefitted the Maple Valley food bank. VanFest Five, held in 2015, boasted four stages and 36 bands performing. VanFest 2016 featured three stages along with a hip hop tent.

VanFest Eight was cancelled in 2018.

== Notable performers ==
- Willis Earl Beal (2014)
- Jason Webley (2014)
- Car Seat Headrest (2015)
- MC Lars (2016)
- Kitty (2015)
