= Composed (album) =

Studio album by Jherek Bischoff
- Released: May 28, 2012
- Genre: Alternative; classical music
- Label: The Leaf Label
- Producer: Jherek Bischoff

Jherek Bischoff chronology
Under the Sour Trees (2009)	Composed (2012)	Cistern (2016)

Composed is the second studio album by Sacramento born musician, composer and arranger Jherek Bischoff. It was released by The Leaf Label and Brassland. The album features nine orchestral pieces with a different vocalist on eight of the nine tracks.

== Background ==
In a departure from the recording techniques normally associated with orchestral music, Bischoff relied heavily on the process of overdubbing in the creation of Composed. Spending a summer travelling by bicycle he recorded "each individual musician of the ‘orchestra’ in their own living rooms", sometimes leading to "one violinist playing one part twenty times...until it was the size of a huge orchestra". After recording the instrumental parts, Bischoff then visited each of the guest vocalists to record them, apart from Caetano Veloso and David Byrne, who recorded their own parts at home.

The other guest vocalists on the album are Greg Saunier (Deerhoof), Mirah Zeitlyn, Paris Hurley, Nels Cline, Craig Wedren, Carla Bozulich, Zac Pennington (Parenthetical Girls), Soko and Dawn McCarthy (Faun Fables).

== Critical reception ==
Professional ratings
Review scores
Source	Rating
The Guardian	4/5 stars
Pitchfork	7.1/10
Spectrum Culture	4/5 stars

In a 4/5 star review, The Guardian describes Composed album as "a collection of lavishly orchestrated pop songs that throb with expressionistic drama, by turns romantic, playful and faintly sinister" adding, "occasionally Composed sounds indulgent, when Bischoff succumbs to syrupy, symphonic cliche; even so, its ambition and singularity are intoxicating". Pitchfork called Bischoff "a hugely talented composer, with sky-high ambitions" but stated that the "multiple guest vocalists...keep things lively while also preventing a through-line from developing...lending the album the feel of a busy, semi-staged opera". Spectrum Culture counters this, saying the album fits together "seamlessly" due to Bischoff's "selflessness". Composed is described as "a piece of immaculately arranged orchestral pop, one whose level of baroque whimsy varies by track and by guest after noteworthy guest" by Alarm.

== Track listing ==
All music by Jherek Bischoff. All lyrics by guest vocalists.

No.	Title	Length
1.	"Introduction (Defeat)"
2.	"Eyes (Jherek Bischoff & David Byrne)"
3.	"The Secret Of The Machines (with Caetano Veloso & Greg Saunier)"
4.	"The Nest (with Mirah Zeitlyn & Paris Hurley)"
5.	"Blossom (Jherek Bischoff with Nels Cline)"
6.	"Your Ghost (with Craig Wedren)"
7.	"Counting (with Carla Bozulich)"
8.	"Young And Lovely (with Zac Pennington & Soko)"
9.	"Insomnia, Death And The Sea (with Dawn McCarthy)"

== Scores: Composed Instrumentals ==
Composed was followed by Scores: Composed Instrumentals, an instrumental version of the album that does not feature any of the guest vocalists from the original record. When purchasing the record, the customer is also offered the score transcripts of the music to download.
