= Cistern (album) =

Studio album by Jherek Bischoff
- Released: 15 July 2016
- Genre: Alternative rock, classical music
- Label: The Leaf Label
- Producer: Jherek Bischoff

Jherek Bischoff chronology
Composed (2012)	Cistern (2016)

Cistern is an orchestral album by Sacramento-born musician, composer and arranger Jherek Bischoff. It was released by The Leaf Label and Brassland on 15 July 2016.

== Background ==
Bischoff began composing and recording Cistern in an empty two million gallon underground water tank under Fort Worden in Port Townsend, Washington. The size of the space was a huge factor in the development of the album. In an interview Bischoff described how "the vast emptiness of the cistern generates a reverb decay that lasts 45 seconds. That means, if you snap your fingers, the sound lasts 45 seconds. That amount of reverberation is an absolutely wild environment to try to create music in." This led to "a record intrinsically linked to the space in which it was conceived. A space which forced Bischoff to slow down, to reflect, to draw on his childhood growing up on a sailing boat - an unexpected journey of rediscovery, from the city back to the Pacific Ocean". After initial experimentations and recording within the water tank, Bischoff moved the process to Future-Past Studio in Hudson, New York where he recorded with Contemporaneous Ensemble. One of the main reasons for this was the " lack of adequate oxygen" for a large group of people inside the water tank. The title track from Cistern premiered on 3 May 2016 on Stereogum, who described it as "triumphantly building orchestral piece with a truly fascinating backstory" and "an incredibly majestic piece of work".

== Accolades ==
Publication	Accolade	Year	Rank	Ref.
Noisey	The 100 Best Albums of 2016	2016	65	
The 405	Top 30 Albums of 2016	2016	9	
Bandcamp	The Best Albums of 2016	2016	48	
A Closer Listen	ACL 2016: The Top 20 Albums of the Year	2016	4	

== Track listing ==
All music by Jherek Bischoff.

No.	Title	Length
1.	"Automatism"
2.	"Closer To Closure"
3.	"Cas(s)iopeia"
4.	"Headless"
5.	"Lemon"
6.	"Attuna"
7.	"The Wolf"
8.	"Cistern"
9.	"The Sea's Son"
