= Viaje (Jason Webley album) =

Studio album by Jason Webley
- Released: 1998
- Genre: Folk
- Length: 39:48
- Label: 11 Records
- Producer: Jason Webley

Jason Webley chronology
Viaje (1998)	Against the Night (1999)

Professional ratings
Review scores
Source	Rating
Allmusic	link

Viaje is the debut album by Jason Webley. It was recorded in Webley's kitchen and self-released in 1998. It was re-released by Springman Records in 2003.

== Track listing ==
1. "Prelude" – 2:02
2. "Without" – 5:01
3. "Halloween" – 3:10
4. "La Mesilla" – 1:53
5. "Postcard" – 5:45
6. "Rocket to God" – 1:48
7. "Old Man Time Ain't No Friend of Mine" – 4:16
8. "Avocado Mushroom Devil Trap" – 7:55
9. "Music That Tears Itself Apart" – 3:22
10. "August Closing His Mouth After a Long Summer's Yawn" – 4:36

== Personnel ==
- Written, produced, performed and engineered by Jason Webley.
- Clarinet on "Music That Tears Itself Apart", additional cello on "Avocado Mushroom Devil Trap" by Vernallis.
- Drums on "Old Man Time Ain't No Friend of Mine" by Sean Lyon.
- Vocals and percussion "Halloween", "Rocket to God", "Old Man Time Ain't No Friend of Mine", and "Music That Tears Itself Apart" by a bunch of drunks.
