= Evelyn Evelyn =

Musical duo

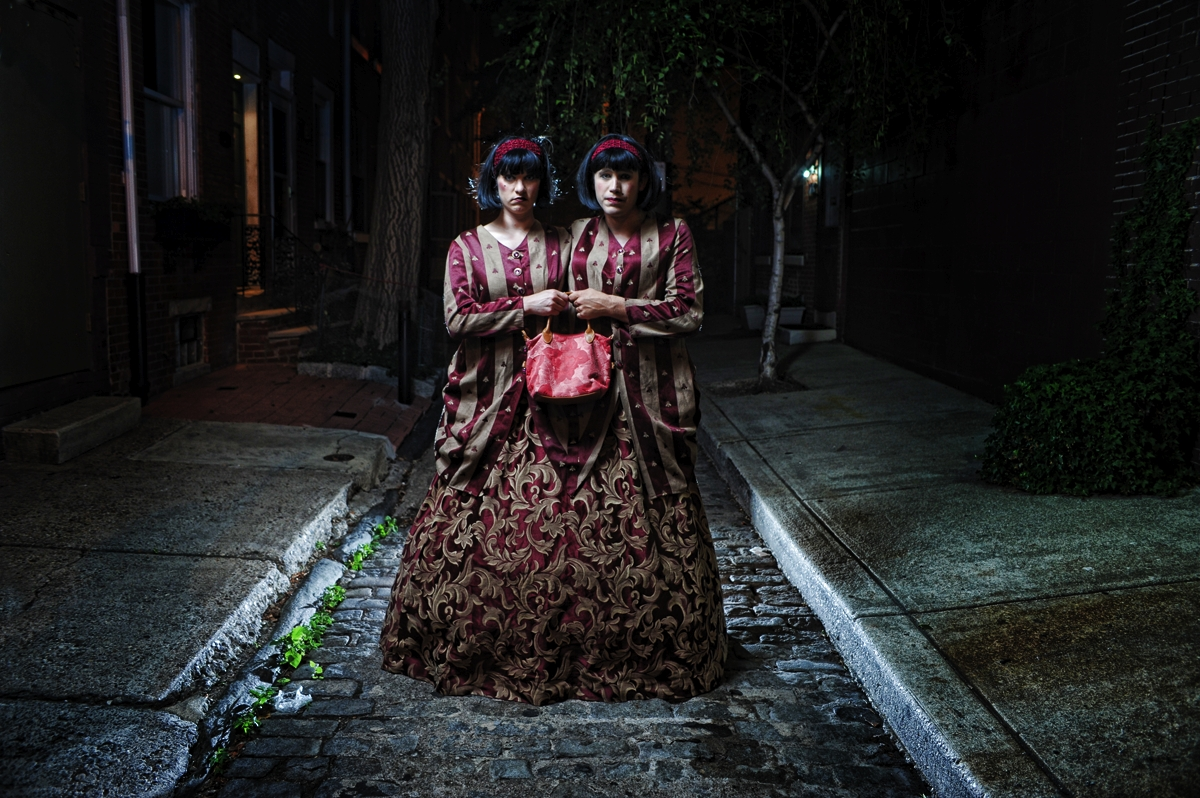

Background information
- Origin: Walla Walla, Washington
- Genres: Baroque pop; americana; dark cabaret
- Years active: 2007–2012
- Labels: Eleven, 8ft.
- Members: Amanda Palmer; Jason Webley
- Website: evelynevelyn.com

Evelyn Evelyn are a fictional musical duo created by Amanda Palmer (of The Dresden Dolls) and Jason Webley. According to the backstory provided by Palmer and Webley, the duo consists of conjoined twin sisters (a.k.a. "Eva" and "Lyn"), Evelyn and Evelyn Neville, who were discovered in 2007 by Palmer and Webley. The twins are actually portrayed by Palmer and Webley, dressed in connected garments.

== Discography ==
In 2007, the band released a 3-song, colored 7" vinyl record, along with a 6-track CD titled Elephant Elephant, which was released in a limited edition of 1,111 copies on Jason's label (11 records); it quickly sold out. The package also contains Amanda and Jason's story of how they met the Evelyns, as well as the process of recording the vinyl, and a sticker of the two-headed elephant, Bimba & Kimba.

A full-length album, Evelyn Evelyn, was released March 30, 2010, followed by a worldwide tour.

=== Albums ===
- Evelyn Evelyn (2010)

=== EPs ===
- Elephant Elephant (2007)

== Bibliography ==
A book by these artists:

- Von Buhler, Cynthia; Palmer, Amanda; Webley, Jason (2011). Evelyn Evelyn (illustrated ed.). Diamond Comic Distributors. p. 144. ISBN 978-1-59582-578-0.

== See also ==
- Black Tape for a Blue Girl
- Dark cabaret and List of dark cabaret artists
- The Art of Asking: How I Learned to Stop Worrying and Let People Help
