= Evelyn Evelyn (album) =

Studio album by Evelyn Evelyn
- Released: March 30, 2010
- Recorded: 2007–2009
- Genre: Dark cabaret; indie folk; vaudeville; spoken word
- Length: 54:06
- Label: Eleven Records; 8ft. records
- Producer: Amanda Palmer; Jason Webley

Evelyn Evelyn is the debut studio album by the fictional musical duo Evelyn Evelyn, created and portrayed by Amanda Palmer and Jason Webley. Released on March 30, 2010, it is a concept album about the lives of the titular Evelyn and Evelyn Neville, a pair of conjoined twin sisters.

A worldwide tour/stage presentation in support of the album was planned for the spring and summer of 2010, including stops in New York City and London.

== Background and overview ==
Evelyn Evelyn are a fictional musical duo created and portrayed by American musicians Amanda Palmer and Jason Webley. The duo consists of Evelyn and Evelyn Neville, a pair of conjoined twins said to have been discovered in 2007 by Palmer and Webley. Evelyn Evelyn is a concept album about the sisters' lives.

The track "My Space" features guest vocals from Kim and Zoe Boekbinder, Margaret Cho, Corn Mo, Morningwood vocalist Chantal Claret, Frances Bean Cobain, Neil Gaiman, Ethan Gold, Ari Gold, Eugene Mirman, Franz Nicolay, Reverend Peyton, Tegan and Sara, Soko, Jimmy Urine, Kirsten Vangsness, Andrew W.K., Gerard Way, and "Weird Al" Yankovic. In a blog post, Palmer wrote:

We got a slew of guest vocalists to join in on a song called "My Space". Let it be known: This wasn't a "We Are the World" type situation in which all these people flew to LA and recorded different lines of the song in a studio under the direction of Quincy Jones. Just so your bubbles aren't burst when you get the record: Everybody took 45 seconds out of their lives and E-MAILED us a file of their voice singing THE SAME LINE, and we mixed it all together, gang-vocal-style. There was a minor tabloid blow-up announcing the album features the "singing debut of Frances Bean Cobain." Oh good God. If you're looking for that, wrong record. Everybody was just having fun, and there's almost no way to distinguish who's singing what...it was mostly a show of symbolic support for the twins on the parts of all these kind people."

== Release and reception ==
Professional ratings
Review scores
Source	Rating
AllMusic	4/5 stars

The album's cover artwork (done by the award-winning artist Cynthia von Buhler) as well as a brand-new song ("A Campaign of Shock and Awe") were debuted on the band's Myspace on December 8, 2009, shortly before the twins began using their Twitter and Facebook.

== Track listing ==
All tracks are written by Evelyn Evelyn, except where noted.

No.	Title	Writer(s)	Length
1.	"Evelyn Evelyn"		4:36
2.	"A Campaign of Shock and Awe"		2:39
3.	"The Tragic Events of September Part I"		4:33
4.	"Have You Seen My Sister Evelyn?"		2:13
5.	"Chicken Man"		3:08
6.	"Tragic Events Part II"		11:11
7.	"Sandy Fishnets"		7:04
8.	"Elephant Elephant"		2:26
9.	"You Only Want Me 'Cause You Want My Sister"		3:49
10.	"Tragic Events Part III"		4:15
11.	"My Space"		5:22
12.	"Love Will Tear Us Apart" (Joy Division)	Ian Curtis; Peter Hook; Stephen Morris; Bernard Sumner	2:50
Total length:			54:06
