= Andru Bemis =

American musician from New Mexico

- Born: April 12, 1978 (age 48); Carlsbad, New Mexico, US
- Genres: Folk, Singer-Songwriter
- Instruments: vocals, banjo, guitar, fiddle, banjolele
- Years active: 2001–present
- Labels: Wepecket Island Records, Eleven Records, Ground Vinyl Records
- Website: andrubemis.com

Andru Bemis is an American musician from New Mexico, currently living in Binghamton, New York.

== Life ==
He performs on the banjo, violin, guitar and banjo-ukulele (which he calls a "banjolele"). Bemis lives a minimalist lifestyle, and is known for his engaging live shows throughout the United States. He tours primarily by train, public transportation, and hitchhiking.

Bemis has released three solo albums: "Plays Past His Bedtime" (2002), "Singer" (2004), and "Rail To Reel" (2006). He has collaborated on albums with Jason Webley, Trent Wagler & Jay Lapp, Rachel Ries, and Elisabeth Pixley-Fink.

For six years starting in 2007, Bemis operated Foundry Hall, a non-profit, all-ages community center and performance venue in South Haven, Michigan.

Bemis hosts the radio show Chenango Sessions.

== Discography ==
- Plays Past His Bedtime (2002)
- Singer (2004)
- Rail To Reel (2006)

=== Collaborations ===
- How Big Is Tacoma (EP with Jason Webley) (2006)
- Say Yes To Yourself (EP with Elisabeth Pixley-Fink) (2011)

=== Other appearances ===
- For You Only (Rachel Ries, Waterbug Records – vocals, banjo, guitar, recording engineer) (2005)
- Adrienna Valentine (Trent Wagler & Jay Lapp – vocals, banjo) (2007)
