= Adina Verson =

American actor

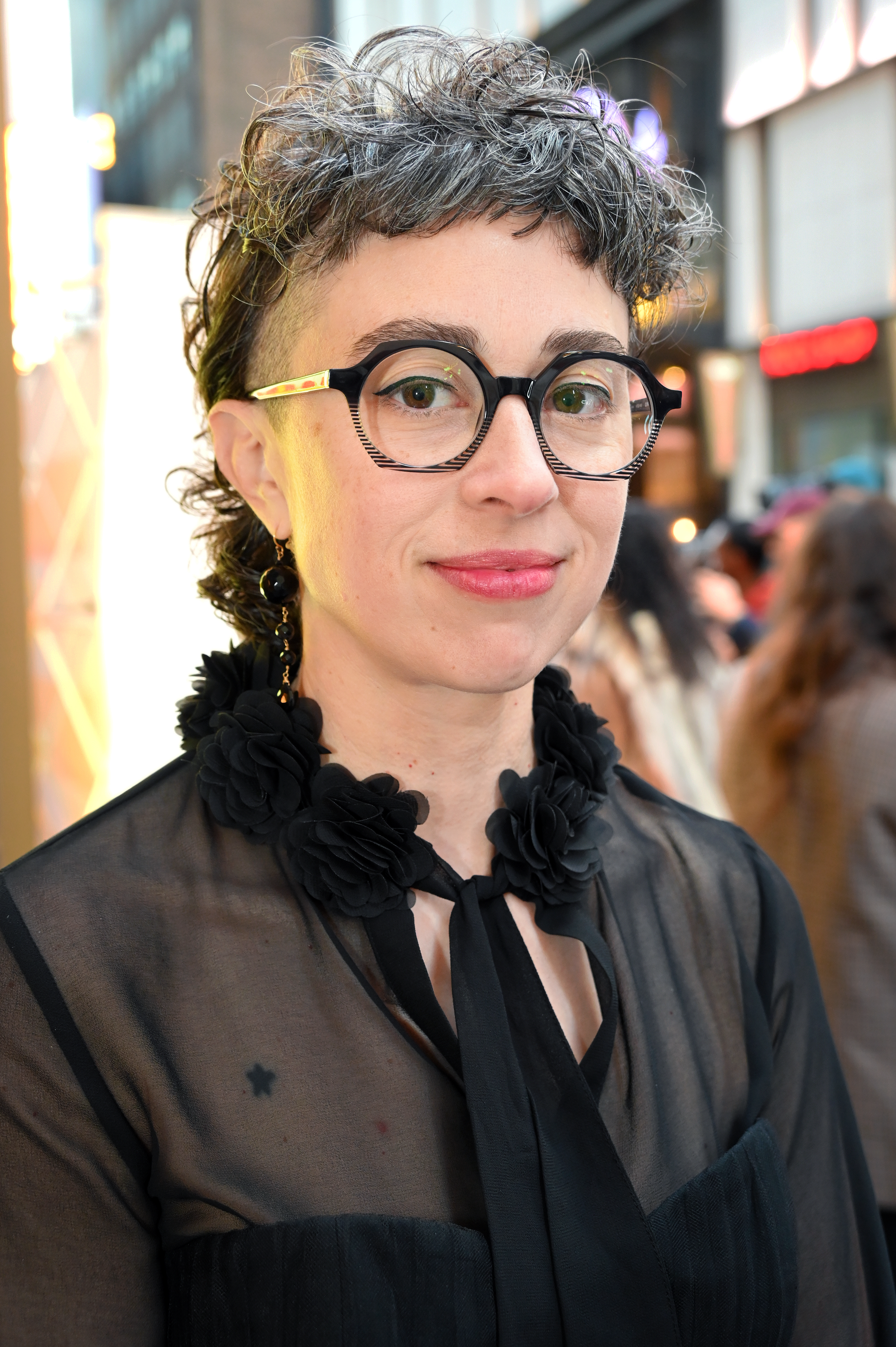
- Verson in 2025
- Born: September 29, 1983
- Education: Boston Conservatory; Yale School of Drama
- Known for: Indecent; Only Murders in the Building
- Spouse: Michael McQuilken
- Children: 1
- Website: www.adinaverson.com

Adina Verson (born September 29, 1983) is an American actor who may be best known for their television role of "Poppy White", assistant of Tina Fey's character (Cinda Canning), in Only Murders in the Building. Primarily a stage actor, their Broadway debut was in Indecent, which ran for two years starting in 2017.

== Biography ==
Verson grew up in the Midwest in a reform Jewish home. They graduated from the Chicago Academy for the Arts in 2001, which inspired them to pursue a BFA in musical theater from the Boston Conservatory. They then received their MFA in acting from the Yale School of Drama. In 2017, Verson appeared in Indecent on Broadway, playing Madje, Reine, and Virginia during the show's two-year run. They played Ali Pfefferman in the A Transparent Musical, based on the Amazon Prime show Transparent, which premiered in May 2023 at the Mark Taper Forum in Los Angeles. The show is planned to open on Broadway in 2024. They were one of the co-founders of the Old Sound Room theater company, which is made up of Yale School of Drama alumni.

Verson auditioned for the role Cinda Canning on Hulu's Only Murders in the Building, a character written for Tina Fey, during the COVID-19 pandemic. When Fey confirmed she was available to play Cinda, the role of Poppy White was written for Verson. Verson has also worked as an audiobook narrator for Penguin Random House.

== Personal life ==
Though Verson's gender identity had been developing prior to joining the cast of Indecent, the play helped them "realize that [they] don't identify with being a woman, and [they] don't identify with being a lesbian". They are married to Michael McQuilken; the couple has one child. Their pronouns are they/she.

== Selected performances ==
=== Stage ===
Year	Title	Role	Notes	Ref
2013	Old Sound Room Lear		With the Old Sound Room company	
2014	As You Like It	Celia	With the Shakespeare Theatre Company	
2018	Collective Rage: A Play in 5 Betties	Betty 2	MCC Theater	
2018	The Lucky Ones	Emma	Ars Nova	
2017–2019	Indecent	Madje, Reine, and Virginia	Broadway debut	
2019	Wives	Wife 2	Playwrights Horizons	
2023	A Transparent Musical	Ali Pfefferman	Center Theater Group	
2025	Liberation	Susan	Roundabout Theatre Company	

=== Television ===
Year	Title	Role	Ref
2014	Deadbeat	Waitress	
2014–2015	The Strain	Miriam Setrakian	
2017	Wormwood	Cocktail waitress	
2016–2018	Mozart in the Jungle	Maria Anna Mozart	
2020	New Amsterdam	Dr. Tabitha Park	
2021–2022	Only Murders in the Building	Poppy White	
2023	And Just Like That...	Laurel	
2026	American Horror Story	Nina	Episode: "Date Night"
