= Michael McQuilken =

American director, filmmaker, and musician

- Born: Beaverton, Oregon, USA
- Education: Yale School of Drama
- Occupations: Director, filmmaker, musician, composer, sound designer
- Notable work: Machine Makes Man
- Spouse: Adina Verson
- Children: 1

Michael McQuilken is an American theater and opera director, filmmaker, and musician.

== Early life ==
Born and raised in Beaverton, Oregon, McQuilken moved to Seattle, Washington in 1997. He began creating fringe theatre while earning a living as a street musician on a homemade junk drum kit. His avant-garde musical Ballyhoo, co-created with John Osebold, won "best play" at the 2000 Seattle Fringe Festival, and his multi-media one-man show A Day in Dignation won him the Seattle Times' Sammy Davis Jr. Award. It was also performed at the Fringe Festivals of Edinburgh, Prague, and Amsterdam, and at PS122 in New York City.

In 2002, McQuilken began working as a sound designer, composer, and onstage musician for several productions at the Intiman Theatre, including Bartlett Sher's production of Nickel and Dimed, which transferred to the Mark Taper Forum in Los Angeles and earned McQuilken the 2002 Backstage West Garland Award for composition. McQuilken continued to write, score, and perform, creating Paper Airplane and Extropia with Collaborator, the Seattle art collective, the latter of which was named one of the best three shows of 2004 by Seattle Weekly.

In 2008, McQuilken debuted the album His Forearms Were Tanks Now, which McQuilken wrote, recorded, and performed on a self-made, loop-based composition and performance station called "the RIG", under the band name The Few Moments. Artist Ira Marcks drew a 50-foot illustration to accompany the album, McQuilken also played as the touring drummer for experimental folk musician Jason Webley.

== Education ==
In 2008, McQuilken was accepted to the Yale School of Drama for graduate studies in theatrical directing. During his time there he directed and scored numerous productions, including Shakespeare's Othello and Gary Henderson's Skin Tight.

Also during this time, he recorded The Few Moments' second album, The Celebritist, and scored filmmaker Sarah Lasley's short film Eve. For his thesis project, McQuilken wrote, scored, and directed an original play with music, JIB.

== Post-university career ==
Upon graduating, McQuilken began collaborating with musician Amanda Palmer. He co-produced the recording and directed the music video of her cover of Nirvana's ' Polly' for SPIN Magazine. In 2011, McQuilken joined Palmer's Grand Theft Orchestra as the studio and touring drummer for the album Theatre Is Evil, also acting as producer, production designer, and theatrical director for the 2012 World Tour. He co-directed the music video "Do It With A Rockstar" with Palmer, Wayne Coyne, and George Salisbury, and in 2013 he directed the music video for "The Bed Song". McQuilken left the Grand Theft Orchestra in April 2013.

McQuilken continues to make music with his solo project, The Few Moments, and runs his own film company, Q Motion Pictures, for which he has filmed numerous music videos for bands such as Jaggery and Leisure Cruise. As a founding member of the New York-based theatre company OldSoundRoom, he has directed numerous productions including an adaptation of Neil Gaiman's short stories, October in the Chair, and an original play with music, Machine Makes Man, co-created and performed with Adina Verson, which won Best International Performance at the 2013 Amsterdam Fringe Festival and subsequently ran at the National Arts Festival in Grahamstown, South Africa.

In 2014, McQuilken directed Room No. 35, a concerto installation composed by Paola Prestini, performed by cellist Maya Beiser, with projections by artist Erika Harrsch. For BAM's 2015 Next Wave Festival, he directed Epiphany: The Cycle of Life, a new music installation, and then directed the world premiere of Angel's Bone, a new opera by composer Du Yun and librettist Royce Vavrek, for the 2016 Prototype Festival. He writes music and tours with David Van Witt for their band, Odysseus Finn, and composes for new musical theatre commissions at various theaters, including Ars Nova.
