= Jason Webley =

American musician (born 1974)

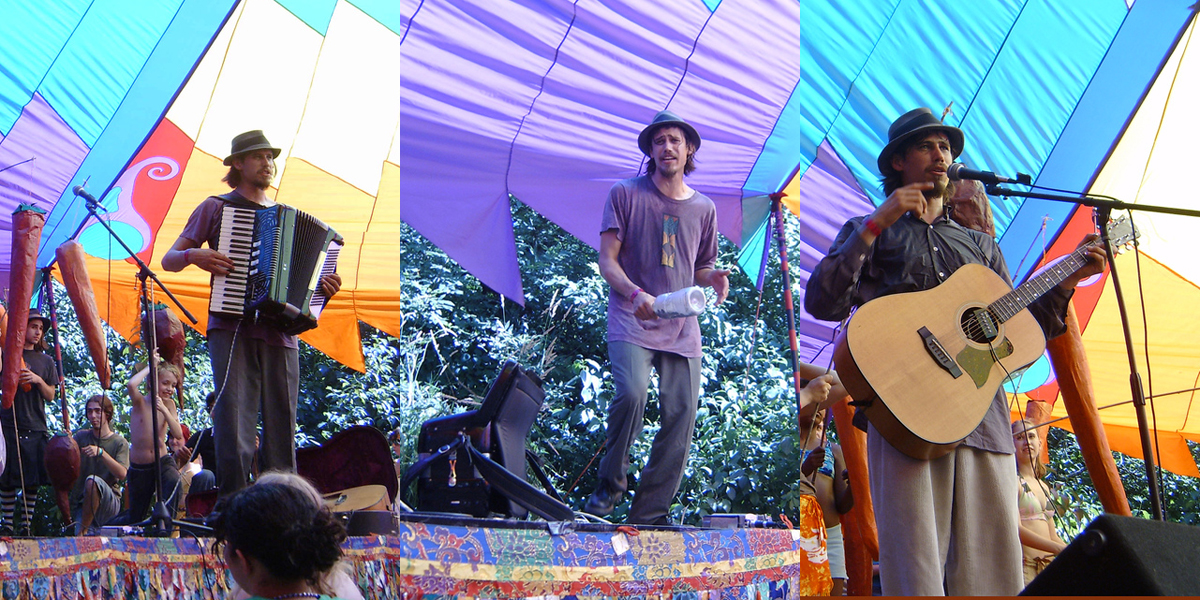
- Jason Webley in 2006 at the Oregon Country Fair

Background information
- Born: June 1, 1974 (age 52)
- Origin: Everett, Washington, United States
- Genres: Folk, punk, experimental, Gypsy punk, folk punk
- Instruments: vocals, accordion, guitar, piano
- Label: Eleven Records
- Member of: Evelyn Evelyn
- Website: http://www.jasonwebley.com/

Jason Webley is an American musician known for his fusion of folk, experimental, and alternative music. Webley plays the guitar and accordion, sometimes providing percussion by stomping or shaking a plastic vodka bottle filled with coins. Webley began his career performing solo, but has collaborated with a wide range of artists. He has also organized several commemorative concerts and events memorializing everything from tragedies in his hometown of Everett, Washington, to tomatoes.

== Early life ==
Webley is originally from Everett, Washington. In high school, Webley played in a punk rock band called Moral Minority. He picked up the accordion in 1996 in his last year in college at the University of Washington when he was part of a performance of Bertolt Brecht's play The Caucasian Chalk Circle, and wrote a couple of songs for the play on the accordion. He later recalled, "I was just a geeky kid; accordion came later. It's since playing accordion that I've become cool. I used to be a geek with an electric guitar. I had a guitar and played in punky bands and I had a computer. I sequenced stuff. I was much geekier."

== Career ==
In the spring of 1998 Webley quit his day job and began busking. Later that year he recorded the album Viaje in his kitchen and independently released it. In 1999, Webley released Against the Night, which would become one of his most popular albums. Against the Night includes "Last Song" and "Dance While the Sky Crashes Down", which would be staples of his live performances for the next two decades.

Webley's first four albums were released or re-released by Springman Records, but he now owns his own record label, Eleven Records, and sells his merchandise via website or at concerts.

Webley plays various instruments on his albums, including guitar, accordion, piano, marimba, and glockenspiel; when he tours, however, he usually only brings his guitar, an accordion, and a vodka bottle filled with coins from around the world. He has been known to do short tours with a backing band. Webley has performed at several festivals, including Burning Man, Glastonbury Festival, VanFest, and the Oregon Country Fair. His sound has been compared to Tom Waits, Vladimir Vysotsky, Leonard Cohen, and Bob Dylan.

Webley's music and live performances reflect his eclectic personality. Webley has a fascination with the number 11. References to the number can be found throughout his discography. He also performed a special commemorative concert on November 11, 2011.

Webley was also once known for incorporating vegetables into his performances. He once owned a late 1990s model Toyota Corolla that had been converted into a giant tomato. It was painted red, and had a green fiberglass stem attached to the roof of the car (until the stem was stolen). He reported at a concert that his beloved Toyota had "passed away" around January 18, 2011. Webley's vegetable fixation is no longer a main element of his live performances.

From 2000 to 2004 Webley pretended to die every Halloween only to be born in the spring.

In May 2014 Jason Webley performed the songs "Promise To The Moon" as well as "These and More Than These" by Joseph Fink while doing a series of live shows with the show Welcome to Night Vale, as well as writing an original song as the character Louie Blasco on the podcast.

In 2011, Webley scaled back his touring schedule and started focusing more on other projects. He still performs annually at some venues such as the Oregon Country Fair.

=== Monsters of Accordion ===
Webley organized the Monsters of Accordion tour, an all-accordion extravaganza that took place on the West Coast. The tour came together when Webley was invited to play at an accordion shop in Oakland, and met two Bay Area accordionists, Daniel Ari and Aaron Seeman. They decided to do an accordion-only tour, which was the first Monsters of Accordion. The tour has since featured such accordionists as Corn Mo, Geoff Berner, Amy Denio, Mark Growden, (former Gogol Bordello member) Stevhen Iancu, and Eric Stern (frontman of Vagabond Opera).

=== Margaret ===
In 2014 Webley released Margaret, a collaborative album commemorating Margaret Rucker, the daughter of a prominent Everett family. The album was sparked by Webley's fascination with Rucker's pyramidal tomb and his friend's discovery of one of Rucker's scrapbooks in a California dumpster. The album was released along with a book and six live shows were performed up and down the West Coast. The project was funded via a Kickstarter Campaign.

=== One Hundred Years Ago Tomorrow ===
In 2016 Webley once again turned to crowdfunding to co-create an album centered on Everett's history. This time the focus was the Everett Massacre. The album commemorated the centennial of the massacre. It was performed live at the historic Everett Theater one day before the centennial (hence the title, One Hundred Years Ago Tomorrow).

=== Flotsam River Circus ===
In 2017, Webley began organizing a floating circus on the Willamette River. After his father became ill the project was delayed for two years. In the summer of 2019, the Flotsam River Circus finally set sail from Corvallis, Oregon, after performing at the Oregon Country Fair. Shows were performed at waterfront parks with a homemade barge serving as the stage. In August 2021 the circus set sail again with a series of performances in the greater Seattle area. During the summer of 2022, the circus floated down the San Joaquin River in Northern California performing in towns such as Walnut Grove and Bethel Island as well as cities like Sacramento, Oakland, and San Francisco.

In August and September 2023, Flotsam performed more than 30 shows along the Mississippi River between Minneapolis and St. Louis. The troupe put on free performances across 5 states, attracting crowds hundreds or even thousands to waterfront parks, marinas, and boat ramps. Unlike some previous performances, most shows were sanctioned by local governments. The tour received significant community support and coverage in local media. Webley cited the works of Mark Twain as an inspiration for the project.

In 2025, Webley led his sixth tour aboard the Flotsam River raft, with a focus on New York. The tour took place along the Erie Canal during the bicentennial celebration. The tour would take a month and a half and have 32 stops, with multiple shows at some of the stops.

== Collaborations ==
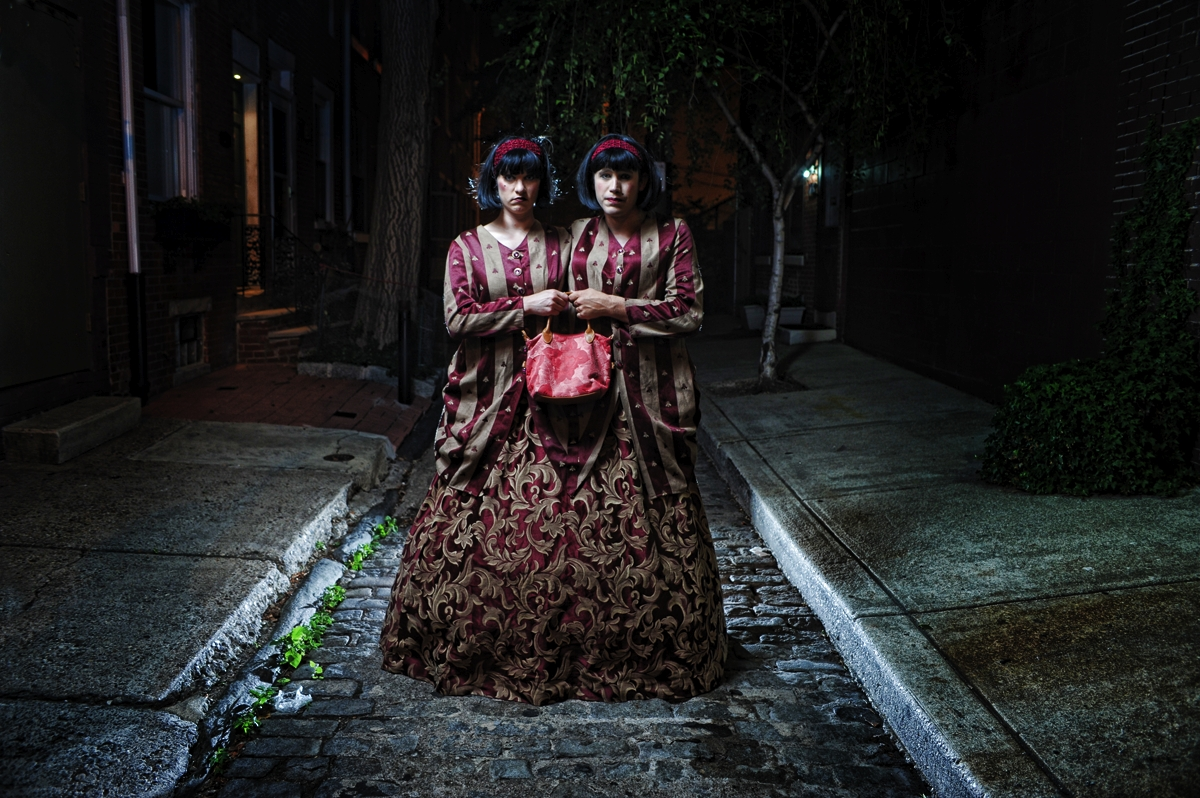
Webley (right) and Amanda Palmer as Evelyn Evelyn

In 2006, Webley announced a planned series of 11 collaborative EPs between him and his songwriter friends, with each recording limited to 1,111 numbered copies. He released six of these EPs between 2006 and 2010, with each consisting of a vinyl 7", paired with a CD of additional songs. He collaborated with poet and musician Jay Thompson, folk singer Andru Bemis, Reverend Peyton of Reverend Peyton's Big Damn Band, and multi-hyphenate Sxip Shirey, and created the bands Evelyn Evelyn (with Amanda Palmer) and Big Little Dipper Dipper (with Caitlin Rippey and Oliver Orion).

In September 2007, Webley collaborated with Amanda Palmer to release Evelyn Evelyn's debut EP Elephant Elephant via Webley's Eleven Records.

After a December 2007 concert at Hampshire College, Webley and Hampshire student Professor Science collaborated on a song about mittens known as "The Mitten Opera". Webley repeated this tradition the following two nights, first after a concert at Bard College, where he and a group of students collaborated on a song called "Clown Car to Mulberry", then at Sarah Lawrence College, where Webley and almost the entire audience performed the hardcore punk–inspired "Bad Milk". All three songs are available on YouTube.

At a concert at The Saint in Asbury Park, New Jersey, in January 2009, Webley was joined on stage by Calamity Menagerie to perform "Ways To Love" and "Quite Contrary" – a song he rarely plays at live shows.

In February 2018, Webley announced the release of the new Amanda Palmer music video "Judy Blume", which he directed.

== Discography ==
=== Solo Studio albums ===
List of albums, with selected information
| Title | Album details |
|---|---|
| Viaje | Released: 1998; Label: 11 Records Springman Records (2003 re-release); Formats: CD, digital download |
| Against the Night | Released: 1999; Label: 11 Records Springman Records (2003 re-release); Formats: CD, digital download |
| Counterpoint | Released: 2002; Label: 11 Records; Formats: CD, digital download |
| Only Just Beginning | Released: 2004; Label: 11 Records; Formats: CD, digital download, LP |
| The Cost of Living | Released: 2007; Label: 11 Records; Formats: CD, digital download, LP |

=== Live albums ===
List of albums, with selected information
| Title | Album details |
|---|---|
| In This Light - Live at Bear Creek | Released: November 11, 2011; Label: 11 Records; Formats: CD, digital download (Bandcamp exclusive) |

=== Collaborative Studio albums ===
List of albums, with selected information
| Title | Album details |
|---|---|
| Evelyn Evelyn (with Amanda Palmer) | Released: March 30, 2010; Label: 11 Records, 8 ft.; Formats: CD, digital download, LP |
| Margaret | Released: 2014; Label: 11 Records; Formats: CD + Book |
| 100 Years Ago Tomorrow | Released: December 6, 2016; Label: 11 Records; Formats: CD, digital download (Bandcamp exclusive) |

=== Collaborative extended plays ===
- Eleven Saints (with Jay Thompson) (2006)
- How Big Is Tacoma (with Andru Bemis) (2006)
- 2 Bottles of Wine (with Reverend Peyton) (2007)
- Elephant Elephant (with Amanda Palmer) (2007)
- Days With You (with Sxip Shirey) (2009)
- Hockey Star (with Oliver Orion and Caitlin Rippey as Big Little Dipper Dipper) (2010)
- Sketches for the Musical Jib (with Amanda Palmer) (2016)

=== Singles ===
- Electric Blanket (with Amanda Palmer) (2018)
- House of Eternal Return (with Amanda Palmer) (2018)

== Bibliography ==
- von Buhler, Cynthia; Palmer, Amanda; Webley, Jason (2011). Evelyn Evelyn (illustrated ed.). Diamond Comic Distributors. p. 144. ISBN 978-1-59582-578-0.
