= Jherek Bischoff =

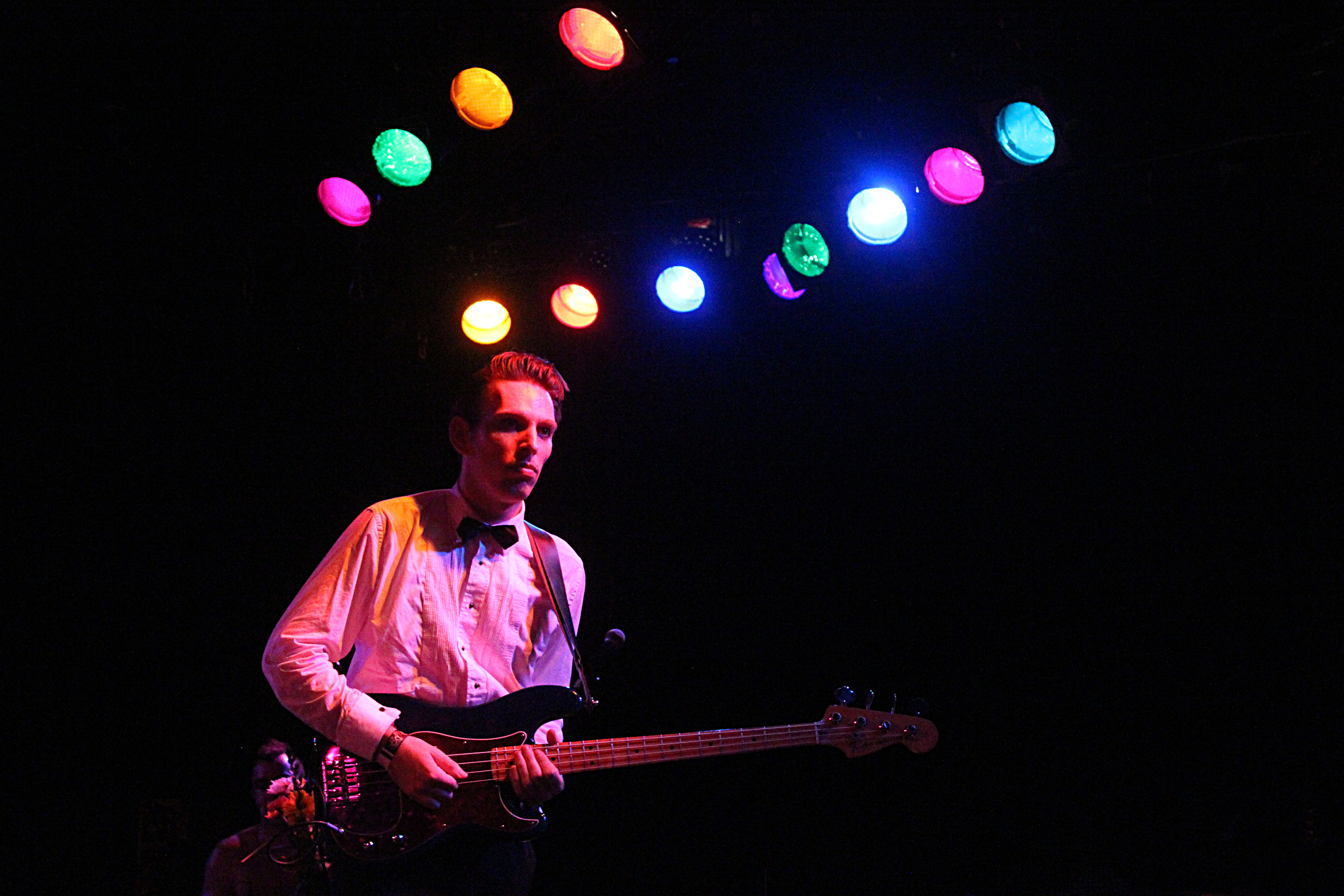
- Bischoff performs with Amanda Palmer and the Grand Theft Orchestra at the Roxy Theater in West Hollywood, California.

Background information
- Born: Jherek Brandon Bischoff; September 11, 1979 (age 46); Sacramento, California, U.S.
- Genres: Neo-classical; Experimental; Ambient; Alternative rock; Indie rock; Indie pop; Synth-pop
- Occupations: Composer; musician; producer; arranger
- Instruments: Bass guitar; guitar; keyboards; double bass; percussion
- Years active: 2000–present
- Labels: Brassland; The Leaf Label
- Website: jherekbischoff.com

Jherek Bischoff (born September 11, 1979) is an American composer, arranger, producer, and multi-instrumental performer based in Los Angeles. His credits include over seventy albums and compositions for orchestra, opera, film, theater, and ballet. Utilizing orchestral, electronic and rock instrumentation, Bischoff blends contemporary classical, ambient and experimental rock music.

Bischoff has released over a dozen studio albums as a solo artist and band member and has credits as a musician, arranger, producer or engineer on over sixty albums. He has written several orchestral commissions for the likes of Kronos Quartet and the Pacific Northwest Ballet, and renowned orchestras, including the BBC Symphony Orchestra and the National Symphony Orchestra, have performed his work. Bischoff has written scores for five plays, including the Royal National Theatre's production of Neil Gaiman's The Ocean at the End of the Lane and an opera, Andersen's Erzahlungen, for Theatre Basel. Bischoff has also written or performed on scores for television and film, including Exhibiting Forgiveness, Organ Trail, The Devil Makes Three, A Futile and Stupid Gesture, Glow, and Wet Hot American Summer: First Day of Camp.

== Biography ==
=== Background ===
Bischoff was born in Sacramento, California. When he was a young child his parents decided they wanted to move aboard a sailboat, and eventually sailed up the coast to the Pacific Northwest. Bischoff spent his early years on the boat and when he was 14 years old, the family departed on a two-year sailing trip to Central America, through the Panama Canal and into the Caribbean.

The family eventually returned to their home on Bainbridge Island, Washington, where Bischoff learned to play a wide variety of instruments. Bischoff has some fluency on a number of woodwinds (saxophone, clarinet), brass (tuba, trombone, trumpet) and stringed instruments (electric bass, guitar, ukulele, banjo, stand-up bass, cello, violin). As a composer, Bischoff is largely self-taught having attended part-time college classes on the topic and gaining experience by writing arrangements and compositions for fellow artists in the Seattle music scene. Music was also a family tradition. His father, who had studied music at the University of California, Davis with John Cage and Stanley Lunetta, had been in avant garde and experimental bands throughout the 1970s.

=== Career ===
Bischoff first emerged as a musician in the first decade of the 2000s. He was a member and collaborator with Parenthetical Girls, Xiu Xiu, Degenerate Art Ensemble, and The Dead Science.

Bischoff gained attention as a solo artist upon the 2012 release of Composed and a related instrumental album Scores: Composed Instrumentals. The album features nine orchestral pieces with a different vocalist on eight of the nine tracks. Many of the vocalists are well known, and included David Byrne, Caetano Veloso, Mirah, Carla Bozulich (Evangelista, Geraldine Fibbers), Craig Wedren (Shudder to Think), Dawn McCarthy (Faun Fables), Zac Pennington (Parenthetical Girls), Soko and more. Guest soloists included Greg Saunier (Deerhoof) and Nels Cline (Wilco). The album was first composed by Bischoff on a ukulele. He then orchestrated, engineered, and mastered the album, achieving an orchestral sound at a low cost by recording the instrumentalists one at a time using a single microphone and a laptop computer recording set-up. Pitchfork wrote that listening to the album whilst being aware of the process "is like imagining someone filling an Olympic-sized pool with an eye dropper: the mind balks, both at the enormity of the undertaking and at the disposition of the person behind it". Bischoff was interviewed by Terry Gross for her NPR show Fresh Air, where he spoke largely about his unique childhood growing up on a sailboat, and the unconventional process by which he recorded his album Composed.

In 2016, Bischoff released Cistern, an ambient orchestral album inspired by time he spent in an empty two million gallon underground water tank under Fort Worden in Port Townsend, Washington. The size of the space was a huge factor in the development of the album. In an interview Bischoff described how "the vast emptiness of the cistern generates a reverb decay that lasts 45 seconds. That means, if you snap your fingers, the sound lasts 45 seconds. That amount of reverberation is an absolutely wild environment to try to create music in". This led to "a record intrinsically linked to the space in which it was conceived. A space which forced Bischoff to slow down, to reflect, to draw on his childhood growing up on a sailing boat – an unexpected journey of rediscovery, from the city back to the Pacific Ocean". Bischoff recorded the album with the New York-based Contemporaneous ensemble at Future-Past in Hudson, NY, a recording studio housed in an historic 19th-century church. Upon release of the album, Bischoff was the featured artist for Times Square Arts Midnight Moment for the month of August and the video for "Cistern" played on screens throughout Times Square. On August 21 and 22, Bischoff performed the album in the middle of Times Square accompanied by his Silent Orchestra on electronic instruments with the audio streamed to wireless headphones.

Bischoff's work for theater includes his 2015 debut Johnny Breitwieser, a musical for Theater Basel; The Flying Classroom, a children's musical for Theater Basel (2016); The Sandman, a Robert Wilson production and collaboration with Anna Calvi, for Düsseldorf's Schauspielhaus (2017); Andersen's Stories, his first opera for Theater Basel (2019); The Ocean at the End of the Lane, the Royal National Theatre's stage adaptation of the book of the same name by Neil Gaiman (2019), Eureka Day, a production for The Old Vic in partnership with Sonia Friedman Productions (2022), and Kasimir und Karoline, his second opera for Staatsoper Hannover (2023).

=== Critical reception ===
Bischoff has been called a "pop polymath" (The New York Times), a "phenom" (The New Yorker), an "orchestral-pop mastermind" (Spin), and "the missing link between the sombre undertones of Ennio Morricone and the unpredictability of John Cale" (New Musical Express). He "is known for pushing the limits of orchestral music" (NPR).

Bischoff was a finalist for The Stranger's Music Genius Award in 2013 and was named Seattle's Best Collaborator by the Seattle Weekly in 2014.

Bischoff was nominated for The Stage Debut Awards 2020 in the Best Composer or Lyricist category for his score for The Ocean at the End of the Lane.

== Works ==
=== Albums as Jherek Bischoff ===
- Jherek Bischoff (2006)
- Composed (2012)
- Scores: Composed Instrumentals (2012)
- Cistern (2016)
- Improvisations (2020)
- The Ocean at the End of the Lane – Music from the National Theatre Production (2021)

=== EPs as Jherek Bischoff ===
- Under the Sour Trees – Split with Richard Webb (2009)
- Chestnuts Roasting on an Open Fire Walk with Me – an EP of Holiday covers in the style of Angelo Badalementi's score for Twin Peaks (2017)
- Chestnuts Roasting on an Open Fire Walk with Me - Deluxe Version / Remastered (2020)

=== Singles as Jherek Bischoff ===
- Jherek Bischoff vs Konono N°1 – Kule Kule (Orchestral Version) – Song on Compilation Tradi-Mods vs Rockers (2010)
- "Red Cloak" (2017)
- "Reminder" (2017)
- "Super Blue Blood Moon" (2017)
- "Gobo" (2018)
- "Celebration" – Devendra Banhart cover (2018)

=== Albums as Ribbons ===
- Royals (2008)
