= List of awards and nominations received by Selena Gomez =

Selena Gomez awards and nominations
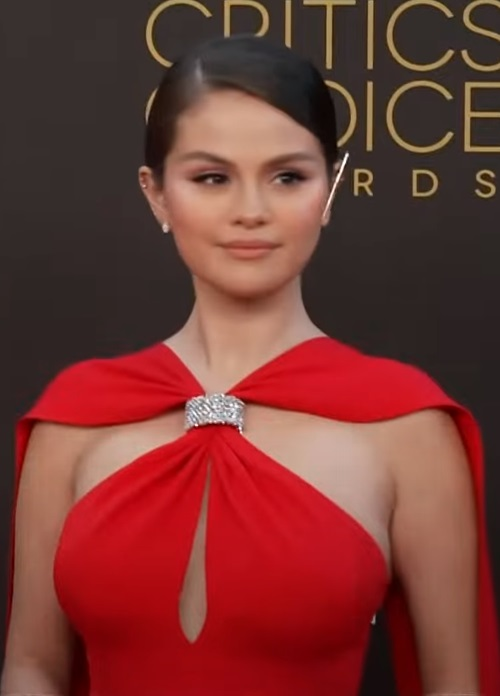
- Gomez at the 2022 Critics' Choice Awards
Awards and nominations
Award	Wins	Nominations
Actor Awards	1	6
American Music Awards	1	3
BAFTA Awards	0	1
Billboard Music Awards	1	12
Cannes Film Festival	1	1
Critics Choice Association	1	7
Emmy Awards	0	10
Golden Globes	0	10
Grammy Awards	0	3
Latin Grammy Awards	1	2
MTV Video Music Awards	2	16
Producers Guild of America Awards	0	5

Totals (Note: Certain award groups do not simply award one winner. They acknowledge several different recipients, have runners-up, and have third place. Since this is a specific recognition and is different from losing an award, runner-up mentions are considered wins in this award tally. For simplification and to avoid errors, each award in this list has been presumed to have had a prior nomination.)
- Wins: 196
- Nominations: 550

American actress, singer and producer Selena Gomez has received numerous awards and nominations throughout her career. She rose to prominence for her portrayal of Alex Russo in the Disney Channel series Wizards of Waverly Place (2007–2012), which earned her an ALMA Award and five consecutive Kids' Choice Awards for Favorite TV Actress—contributing to a record total of 13 Kids' Choice Awards, the most won by any individual. Gomez received early recognition for her performances in youth-oriented film and television, including a Young Artist Award in 2009, before transitioning to more mature roles with Spring Breakers (2012). Her debut solo album, Stars Dance (2013), spawned the single "Come & Get It", which won the MTV Video Music Award for Best Pop Video. At the 2014 Teen Choice Awards, she was honored with the Ultimate Choice Award.

Following the release of her second studio album, Revival, Gomez received the Chart-Topper Award at Billboard Women in Music. The following year, she won the American Music Award for Favorite Pop/Rock Female Artist, earned an Artist of the Year nomination, and was nominated for Top Female Artist at the Billboard Music Awards. She was subsequently named Billboard's Woman of the Year in 2017, and later received the same honor in 2025 at Billboard Latin Women in Music. In 2020, Gomez released her third studio album, Rare, was honored by the Latin Recording Academy as one of its Leading Ladies of Entertainment, and was named one of Time's 100 most influential people. Her first Spanish-language EP, Revelación (2021), earned a Grammy Award nomination for Best Latin Pop Album.

Gomez received critical praise for her performance as Mabel in the Hulu mystery-comedy series Only Murders in the Building (2021–present), which earned her the Satellite Award for Best Actress in a Television Series – Musical or Comedy, as well as nominations for a Critics' Choice Award, a Primetime Emmy Award, and four Golden Globe Awards—all in lead actress categories for comedy series. She also received the Actor Award for Outstanding Performance by an Ensemble in a Comedy Series. As an executive producer of the series, Gomez has received five Primetime Emmy Award nominations for Outstanding Comedy Series—making her the most-nominated Latina producer in Emmy history—and five Producers Guild of America Award nominations. Her collaboration with Rema on the remix of "Calm Down" received five Billboard Music Award nominations in 2023, winning Top Afrobeats Song, and also won the MTV Video Music Award for Best Afrobeats.

At the 2024 Cannes Film Festival, Gomez and her co-stars in Emilia Pérez (2024) jointly won the Best Actress Award, with the ensemble also earning nominations at the Actor Awards and the Critics' Choice Awards. Her performance in the film also earned nominations for the BAFTA Award and the Golden Globe Award for Best Supporting Actress, and she was appointed Chevalier de l'Ordre des arts et des lettres by the Government of France for her work on the film. Her collaborative album with Benny Blanco, I Said I Love You First (2025), yielded "Bluest Flame", which received a Grammy nomination for Best Dance Pop Recording. In addition, Gomez has earned several accolades for her philanthropic efforts and mental health advocacy work. Her beauty brand, Rare Beauty, was included in Time's 2024 list of the 100 most influential companies.

== Major associations ==
=== Actor Awards ===
Year	Category	Nominated work	Result	Ref.
2022	Outstanding Ensemble in a Comedy Series	Only Murders in the Building (season 1)	Nominated	
2023	Outstanding Ensemble in a Comedy Series	Only Murders in the Building (season 2)	Nominated	
2024	Outstanding Ensemble in a Comedy Series	Only Murders in the Building (season 3)	Nominated	
2025	Outstanding Cast in a Motion Picture	Emilia Pérez	Nominated	
2025	Outstanding Ensemble in a Comedy Series	Only Murders in the Building (season 4)	Won	
2026	Outstanding Ensemble in a Comedy Series	Only Murders in the Building (season 5)	Nominated	

=== BAFTA Awards ===
Year	Category	Nominated work	Result	Ref.
British Academy Film Awards
2025	Best Actress in a Supporting Role	Emilia Pérez	Nominated	

=== Cannes Film Festival ===
Year	Category	Nominated work	Result	Ref.
2024	Best Actress (Note: Shared with Karla Sofía Gascón, Adriana Paz and Zoe Saldaña.)	Emilia Pérez	Won	

=== Critics Choice Awards ===
Year	Category	Nominated work	Result	Ref.
Critics Choice Awards
2022	Best Actress in a Comedy Series	Only Murders in the Building (season 1)	Nominated	
2025	Best Acting Ensemble	Emilia Pérez	Nominated	
2025	Best Song	"Mi camino" (from Emilia Pérez)	Nominated	
Critics Choice Real TV Awards
2022	Female Star of the Year	Selena + Chef (season 3)	Won	
2023	Best Show Host	Selena + Chef (season 4)	Nominated	
2023	Star of the Year	Selena + Chef (season 4)	Nominated	
2024	Female Star of the Year	Selena + Restaurant	Nominated	

=== Emmy Awards ===
Year	Category	Nominated work	Result	Ref.
Children's and Family Emmy Awards
2022	Outstanding Special Class Animated Program (Note: Awards and nominations Gomez has received as executive producer.)	Hotel Transylvania: Transformania	Nominated	
Daytime Emmy Awards
2023	Outstanding Culinary Series (Note: Awards and nominations Gomez has received as executive producer/host.)	Selena + Chef (season 4)	Nominated	
2024	Outstanding Culinary Series	Selena + Chef: Home for the Holidays	Nominated	
2025	Outstanding Culinary Instructional Series	Selena + Restaurant	Nominated	
Primetime Emmy Awards
2022	Outstanding Comedy Series	Only Murders in the Building (season 1)	Nominated	
2024 (1) (Note: Due to the 2023 Hollywood labor disputes, the 75th Primetime Emmy Awards ceremony, originally scheduled for September 18, 2023, was delayed, resulting in two ceremonies being held in 2024. The delayed 75th Primetime Emmy Awards ceremony was held on January 15, 2024, and the 76th Primetime Emmy Awards ceremony were held on September 15, 2024.)	Outstanding Comedy Series	Only Murders in the Building (season 2)	Nominated	
2024 (2)	Outstanding Comedy Series	Only Murders in the Building (season 3)	Nominated	
2024 (2)	Outstanding Lead Actress in a Comedy Series	Only Murders in the Building (episode: "Ghost Light")	Nominated	
2025	Outstanding Comedy Series	Only Murders in the Building (season 4)	Nominated	
2026	Outstanding Comedy Series	Only Murders in the Building (season 5)	Nominated	

=== Golden Globes ===
Year	Category	Nominated work	Result	Ref.
2022	Best Television Series – Musical or Comedy (Note: The awards for Best Television Series – Musical or Comedy, Best Television Series – Drama, and Best Limited or Anthology Series or Television Film are given to the individual producers accredited by the Producers Guild of America for those television programs.) (Note: Gomez is a producer accredited by the Producers Guild of America for Only Murders in the Building.)	Only Murders in the Building (season 1)	Nominated	
2023	Best Television Series – Musical or Comedy	Only Murders in the Building (season 2)	Nominated	
2023	Best Actress in a Television Series – Musical or Comedy	Only Murders in the Building (season 2)	Nominated	
2024	Best Television Series – Musical or Comedy	Only Murders in the Building (season 3)	Nominated	
2024	Best Female Actor in a Television Series – Musical or Comedy	Only Murders in the Building (season 3)	Nominated	
2025 (Note: Note: "Mi camino" (from: Emilia Pérez), performed by Gomez, was nominated for Best Original Song at the 82nd Golden Globe Awards, however in this category the nomination is credited to the songwriters and not the performer. The song was written by Clément Ducol and Camille.)	Best Supporting Female Actor – Motion Picture	Emilia Pérez	Nominated	
2025	Best Television Series – Musical or Comedy	Only Murders in the Building (season 4)	Nominated	
2025	Best Female Actor in a Television Series – Musical or Comedy	Only Murders in the Building (season 4)	Nominated	
2026	Best Television Series – Musical or Comedy	Only Murders in the Building (season 5)	Nominated	
2026	Best Female Actor in a Television Series – Musical or Comedy	Only Murders in the Building (season 5)	Nominated	

=== Grammy Awards ===
Year	Category	Nominated work	Result	Ref.
Grammy Awards
2022	Best Latin Pop Album	Revelación	Nominated	
2023	Album of the Year (Note: For her work as the featured artist on "Let Somebody Go".)	Music of the Spheres	Nominated	
2026	Best Dance Pop Recording	"Bluest Flame" (with Benny Blanco)	Nominated	
Latin Grammy Awards
2020	Leading Ladies of Entertainment	—N/a	Honored	
2021	Best Short Form Music Video	"De Una Vez"	Nominated	

=== Producers Guild of America Awards ===
Year	Category	Nominated work	Result	Ref.
2022	Best Episodic Comedy	Only Murders in the Building (season 1)	Nominated	
2023	Best Episodic Comedy	Only Murders in the Building (season 2)	Nominated	
2024	Best Episodic Comedy	Only Murders in the Building (season 3)	Nominated	
2025	Best Episodic Comedy	Only Murders in the Building (season 4)	Nominated	
2026	Best Episodic Comedy	Only Murders in the Building (season 5)	Nominated	

== Miscellaneous awards ==
Name of the award ceremony, year presented, recipient of the award, category and result
Award	Year (Note: Indicates the year of ceremony. Each year is linked to the article about the awards held that year, wherever possible.)	Category	Nominated work	Result	Ref.
African Muzik Magazine Awards	2023	Best Collaboration	"Calm Down" (with Rema)	Nominated	
Alliance of Women Film Journalists EDA Awards	2013	Actress Most in Need of a New Agent (Note: Shared with Ashley Benson, Rachel Korine & Vanessa Hudgens.)	Spring Breakers	Nominated	
Alliance of Women Film Journalists EDA Awards	2025	Best Ensemble Cast and Casting Director	Emilia Pérez	Nominated	
Allure Readers' Choice Awards	2021	Best New Brand	Rare Beauty	Won	
ALMA Awards	2008	Outstanding Female Performance in a Comedy Television Series	Wizards of Waverly Place	Nominated	
ALMA Awards	2009	Year in TV Comedy – Actress	Wizards of Waverly Place	Won	
ALMA Awards	2011	Favorite Movie Actress Comedy/Musical	Monte Carlo	Nominated	
ALMA Awards	2011	Favorite TV Actress – Leading Role in a Comedy	Wizards of Waverly Place	Nominated	
ALMA Awards	2011	Favorite Female Music Artist	Selena Gomez	Nominated	
American Music Awards	2016	Artist of the Year	Selena Gomez	Nominated	
American Music Awards	2016	Favorite Pop/Rock Female Artist	Selena Gomez	Won	
American Music Awards	2026	Best Latin Song	"Ojos Tristes" (with Benny Blanco and The Marías)	Nominated	
American Reality Television Awards	2023	Reality Royalty Award	Selena + Chef	Won	
Anthem Awards	2024 (1) (Note: The Anthem Awards were held twice in 2024.)	Diversity, Equity & Inclusion – Social Media Content, Campaign or Channel – Awareness	What are you made of? – WORD Creative & Rare Beauty	Gold	
Anthem Awards	2024 (2)	Health – Media Impact Campaign – Awareness	Make a Good Call – Rare Beauty	Gold	
Anthem Awards	2025	Health – For Profit – Awareness	Make a Rare Impact by Rare Beauty and Sephora	Gold	
Anthem Awards	2025	Health – Partnership or Collaboration – Awareness	Make a Rare Impact by Rare Beauty and Sephora	Silver	
ASCAP Latin Music Awards	2019	Winning Songs (Note: Awards and nominations Gomez has received as songwriter.)	"Taki Taki" (DJ Snake featuring Selena Gomez, Ozuna & Cardi B)	Won	
ASCAP Latin Music Awards	2022	Winning Songwriters & Publishers	"Baila Conmigo" (with Rauw Alejandro)	Won	
ASCAP Latin Music Awards	2026	Winning Songwriters & Publishers	"Ojos Tristes" (with Benny Blanco and The Marías)	Won	
ASCAP Pop Music Awards	2016	Most Performed Songs	"Good for You" (featuring ASAP Rocky)	Won	
ASCAP Pop Music Awards	2017 (Note: "Same Old Love" received an ASCAP Pop Music Award; however, since Gomez is not credited as a songwriter, she was not among the award's recipients.)	Winning Songs	"Hands to Myself"	Won	
ASCAP Pop Music Awards	2017	Winning Songs	"We Don't Talk Anymore" (Charlie Puth featuring Selena Gomez)	Won	
ASCAP Pop Music Awards	2018	Winning Songs	"It Ain't Me" (with Kygo)	Won	
ASCAP Pop Music Awards	2019	Winning Songs	"Back to You"	Won	
ASCAP Pop Music Awards	2019	Winning Songs	"Wolves" (with Marshmello)	Won	
ASCAP Pop Music Awards	2021	Winning Songwriters & Publishers	"Lose You to Love Me"	Won	
ASCAP Pop Music Awards	2024	Song of the Year	"Calm Down" (with Rema)	Won	
ASCAP Pop Music Awards	2024	Winning Songwriters & Publishers	"Single Soon"	Won	
ASCAP Rhythm & Soul Music Awards	2024	Winning R&B/Hip-Hop & Rap Songs	"Calm Down" (with Rema)	Won	
Astra Film Awards	2024 (2) (Note: The Astra Awards were held twice in 2024.)	Best Supporting Actress	Emilia Pérez	Nominated	
Astra Film Awards	2024 (2)	Best Cast Ensemble	Emilia Pérez	Nominated	
Astra Film Awards	2024 (2)	Best Original Song	"Mi camino" (from Emilia Pérez)	Won	
Astra TV Awards	2022	Best Actress in a Streaming Series, Comedy	Only Murders in the Building	Won	
Astra TV Awards	2024 (1) (Note: The 3rd Astra TV Awards ceremony, originally scheduled for August 12–13, 2023, was postponed, resulting in two ceremonies being held in 2024. The delayed 3rd Astra TV Awards ceremony was held on January 8, 2024, and the 4th Astra TV Awards ceremony was held on December 8, 2024.)	Best Actress in a Streaming Series, Comedy	Only Murders in the Building	Nominated	
Astra TV Awards	2024 (2)	Best Actress in a Streaming Series, Comedy	Only Murders in the Building	Nominated	
Astra TV Awards	2025	Best Cast Ensemble in a Streaming Comedy Series	Only Murders in the Building	Nominated	
Astra TV Awards	2025	Best Actress in a Comedy Series	Only Murders in the Building	Nominated	
Astra TV Awards	2026	Best Streaming Comedy Ensemble	Only Murders in the Building	Nominated	
Astra TV Awards	2026	Best Actress in a Comedy Series	Only Murders in the Building	Nominated	
BBC Radio 1's Teen Awards	2016	Best International Solo Artist	Selena Gomez	Nominated	
BET Awards	2010	YoungStars Award	Selena Gomez	Nominated	
Billboard Latin Music Awards	2019	Hot Latin Song of the Year	"Taki Taki" (DJ Snake featuring Selena Gomez, Ozuna & Cardi B)	Nominated	
Billboard Latin Music Awards	2019	Hot Latin Song of the Year – Vocal Event	"Taki Taki" (DJ Snake featuring Selena Gomez, Ozuna & Cardi B)	Nominated	
Billboard Latin Music Awards	2019	Digital Song of the Year	"Taki Taki" (DJ Snake featuring Selena Gomez, Ozuna & Cardi B)	Nominated	
Billboard Latin Music Awards	2021	Hot Latin Songs Artist of the Year – Female	Selena Gomez	Nominated	
Billboard Latin Music Awards	2021	Top Latin Albums Artist of the Year – Female	Selena Gomez	Nominated	
Billboard Latin Music Awards	2021	Latin Pop Album of the Year	Revelación	Nominated	
Billboard Latin Music Awards	2025	Hot Latin Songs Artist of the Year – Female	Selena Gomez	Nominated	
Billboard Latin Music Awards	2025	Latin Pop Song of the Year	"Ojos Tristes" (with Benny Blanco and The Marías)	Nominated	
Billboard Latin Women in Music	2025	Woman of the Year	Selena Gomez	Won	
Billboard Music Awards	2015	Top Social Artist	Selena Gomez	Nominated	
Billboard Music Awards	2016	Top Female Artist	Selena Gomez	Nominated	
Billboard Music Awards	2016	Top Social Media Artist	Selena Gomez	Nominated	
Billboard Music Awards	2017	Top Social Artist	Selena Gomez	Nominated	
Billboard Music Awards	2018	Top Dance/Electronic Song	"It Ain't Me" (with Kygo)	Nominated	
Billboard Music Awards	2019	Top Latin Song	"Taki Taki" (DJ Snake featuring Selena Gomez, Ozuna & Cardi B)	Nominated	
Billboard Music Awards	2019	Top Dance/Electronic Song	"Taki Taki" (DJ Snake featuring Selena Gomez, Ozuna & Cardi B)	Nominated	
Billboard Music Awards	2023	Top Radio Song	"Calm Down" (with Rema)	Nominated	
Billboard Music Awards	2023	Top Collaboration	"Calm Down" (with Rema)	Nominated	
Billboard Music Awards	2023	Top Billboard Global 200 Song	"Calm Down" (with Rema)	Nominated	
Billboard Music Awards	2023	Top Billboard Global (Excl. U.S.) Song	"Calm Down" (with Rema)	Nominated	
Billboard Music Awards	2023	Top Afrobeats Song	"Calm Down" (with Rema)	Won	
Billboard Women in Music	2015	Chart-Topper Award	Selena Gomez	Won	
Billboard Women in Music	2017	Woman of the Year	Selena Gomez	Won	
Bravo Otto	2010	Super TV Star	Wizards of Waverly Place	Silver	
Bravo Otto	2011	Super Female TV Star	Wizards of Waverly Place	Gold	
Bravo Otto	2012	Super Female Singer	Selena Gomez	Bronze	
Bravo Otto	2012	Internet-Star	Selena Gomez	Nominated	
Bravo Otto	2012	Super Female Movie Star	Monte Carlo	Silver	
Bravo Otto	2012	Super Female TV Star	Wizards of Waverly Place	Gold	
Bravo Otto	2013	Super Female Singer	Selena Gomez	Gold	
Bravo Otto	2013	Internet-Star	Selena Gomez	Nominated	
Bravo Otto	2013	Super Female TV Star	Wizards of Waverly Place	Gold	
Bravo Otto	2014	Superstar	Selena Gomez	Nominated	
Bravo Otto	2014	Super-BFFs	Selena Gomez & Taylor Swift	Gold	
Bravo Otto	2014	Sexy Babe	Spring Breakers	Gold	
Bravo Otto	2016	Super Female Singer	Selena Gomez	Nominated	
Bravo Otto	2017	Super Female Singer	Selena Gomez	Silver	
Bravo Otto	2021	International Singer	Selena Gomez	Nominated	
Bravo Otto	2024	International Singer	Selena Gomez	Nominated	
Bravo Otto	2026	Beauty & Style	Selena Gomez	Gold	
BrazilFoundation's New York Gala (Note: The BrazilFoundation's New York Gala is an annual event aimed at raising funds to support social and environmental initiatives in Brazil.)	2024	Philanthropy Leadership Award	Selena Gomez	Won	
Buenos Aires Music Video Festival (Note: The Buenos Aires Music Video Festival was established in 2019 to honor excellence in music video craft around the world based on a peer-voted selection process.)	2021	Video Pop	"Baila Conmigo" (with Rauw Alejandro)	Nominated	
Capri Hollywood International Film Festival	2025	Best Ensemble Cast	Emilia Pérez	Won	
Circle Chart Music Awards	2021	Song of the Year – August	"Ice Cream" (with Blackpink)	Nominated	
Clio Awards	2020	Music Marketing – Partnerships & Collaborations	"Ice Cream" (with Blackpink)	Silver	
Do Something Awards	2012	Couple	Selena Gomez & Justin Bieber	Nominated	
Do Something Awards	2012	Facebook	Selena Gomez & UNICEF	Nominated	
Electronic Dance Music Awards	2016	Best Extended Radio Edit	"I Want You to Know" (Zedd featuring Selena Gomez)	Won	
Elle's Women in Hollywood (Note: Elle Women in Hollywood Awards is an annual awards event hosted by Elle magazine that celebrates women in the entertainment industry.)	2024	The Risk Takers (Note: Shared with Karla Sofía Gascón and Zoe Saldaña.)	Emilia Pérez	Won	
Fragrance Foundation Awards	2026	Prestige & Popular Packaging of the Year	Rare Beauty	Nominated	
Glamour Awards	2012	International Musician/Solo Artist	Selena Gomez	Nominated	
Glamour Awards	2016	International Musician/Solo Artist	Selena Gomez	Nominated	
Glamour Awards	2017	International Music Act	Selena Gomez	Nominated	
Glamour Women of the Year Awards	2012	Independent Spirit Award	Selena Gomez	Won	
Global Awards	2018	Best Female	Selena Gomez	Nominated	
Global Awards	2023	Best Social Trended Song	"Calm Down" (with Rema)	Nominated	
Golden Raspberry Awards	2014	Worst Actress	Getaway	Nominated	
Gracie Awards	2010	Outstanding Female Rising Star in a Comedy Series	Wizards of Waverly Place	Won	
The Headies	2023	International Artist of the Year	Selena Gomez	Won	
Heat Latin Music Awards	2025	Best Song for Videogames, Series or Movies	"Mi camino" (from Emilia Pérez)	Nominated	
Hispanic Heritage Awards	2020	Arts Award	Selena Gomez	Won	
Hito Music Awards	2017	Western Song of the Year	"We Don't Talk Anymore" (Charlie Puth featuring Selena Gomez)	Won	
Hollywood Music in Media Awards	2022	Original Song – Documentary	"My Mind & Me" (from Selena Gomez: My Mind & Me)	Nominated	
Hollywood Music in Media Awards	2024	Original Song – Feature Film	"Mi camino" (with Édgar Ramírez) (from Emilia Pérez)	Nominated	
The Hollywood Reporter's Women in Entertainment Gala (Note: The Women in Entertainment Gala is an annual event hosted by The Hollywood Reporter that recognizes influential figures in the entertainment industry.)	2024	Equity in Entertainment Award	Selena Gomez	Won	
Hollywood Style Awards (Note: The Hollywood Style Awards were organized by Hollywood Life to honor celebrity style contributions to the Hollywood aesthetic scene.)	2009	Style Ingenue	Selena Gomez	Won	
Hungarian Music Awards	2018	Foreign Electronic Music Album/Record of the Year	"It Ain't Me" (with Kygo)	Nominated	
IDA Documentary Awards	2019	Best Episodic Series	Living Undocumented	Nominated	
iHeartRadio MMVAs	2014	Your Fave International Artist/Group	Selena Gomez	Won	
iHeartRadio MMVAs	2014	International Video of the Year – Artist	"Come & Get It"	Nominated	
iHeartRadio MMVAs	2015	Fan Fave International Artist or Group	Selena Gomez	Nominated	
iHeartRadio MMVAs	2016	iHeartRadio International Artist of the Year	"Hands to Myself"	Nominated	
iHeartRadio MMVAs	2016	Most Buzzworthy International Artist or Group	"Hands to Myself"	Nominated	
iHeartRadio MMVAs	2018	Fan Fave Single	"Wolves" (with Marshmello)	Won	
iHeartRadio Music Awards	2014	Instagram Award	Selena Gomez	Nominated	
iHeartRadio Music Awards	2015	Best Fan Army	Selena Gomez	Nominated	
iHeartRadio Music Awards	2016	Female Artist of the Year	Selena Gomez	Nominated	
iHeartRadio Music Awards	2016	Best Fan Army	Selena Gomez	Nominated	
iHeartRadio Music Awards	2016	Biggest Triple Threat	Selena Gomez	Won	
iHeartRadio Music Awards	2017	Female Artist of the Year	Selena Gomez	Nominated	
iHeartRadio Music Awards	2017	Best Fan Army	Selena Gomez	Nominated	
iHeartRadio Music Awards	2018	Dance Song of the Year	"It Ain't Me" (with Kygo)	Nominated	
iHeartRadio Music Awards	2018	Best Music Video	"Bad Liar"	Nominated	
iHeartRadio Music Awards	2018	Best Fan Army	Selena Gomez	Nominated	
iHeartRadio Music Awards	2019	Best Music Video	"Taki Taki" (DJ Snake featuring Selena Gomez, Ozuna & Cardi B)	Nominated	
iHeartRadio Music Awards	2020	Latin Pop/Urban Song of the Year	"Taki Taki" (DJ Snake featuring Selena Gomez, Ozuna & Cardi B)	Nominated	
iHeartRadio Music Awards	2020	Best Lyrics	"Lose You to Love Me"	Nominated	
iHeartRadio Music Awards	2020	Best Fan Army	Selena Gomez	Nominated	
iHeartRadio Music Awards	2021	Best Fan Army	Selena Gomez	Nominated	
iHeartRadio Music Awards	2022	Best Fan Army	Selena Gomez	Nominated	
iHeartRadio Music Awards	2023	Best Music Video	"Calm Down" (with Rema)	Nominated	
iHeartRadio Music Awards	2023	Best Fan Army	Selena Gomez	Nominated	
iHeartRadio Music Awards	2023	Favorite Documentary	Selena Gomez: My Mind & Me	Won	
iHeartRadio Music Awards	2024	Song of the Year	"Calm Down" (with Rema)	Nominated	
iHeartRadio Music Awards	2024	Pop Song of the Year	"Calm Down" (with Rema)	Nominated	
iHeartRadio Music Awards	2024	Best Collaboration	"Calm Down" (with Rema)	Won	
iHeartRadio Music Awards	2024	Best Fan Army	Selena Gomez	Nominated	
iHeartRadio Music Awards	2025	Favorite Surprise Guest	Coldplay bringing out Selena Gomez (Note: Selena Gomez on Coldplay's Music of the Spheres World Tour.)	Nominated	
iHeartRadio Titanium Award (Note: The iHeartRadio Titanium Award is an award which recognized artists who have reached a threshold of a billion Total Audience Spins.)	2018	1 Billion Total Audience Spins on iHeartRadio Stations (Note: Although "Calm Down" by Rema and Gomez surpassed 1.2 billion total audience spins on iHeartRadio stations in 2023, its receipt of an iHeartRadio Titanium Award has not been officially confirmed.)	"It Ain't Me" (with Kygo)	Won	
iHeartRadio Titanium Award	2020	1 Billion Total Audience Spins on iHeartRadio Stations	"Back to You"	Won	
Imagen Awards	2008	Best Actress – Television	Wizards of Waverly Place	Nominated	
Imagen Awards	2009	Best Actress – Television	Wizards of Waverly Place	Nominated	
Imagen Awards	2010	Best Actress – Television	Wizards of Waverly Place: The Movie	Nominated	
Imagen Awards	2011	Best Young Actress – Television	Wizards of Waverly Place	Won	
Imagen Awards	2012	Best Young Actress – Television	Wizards of Waverly Place	Nominated	
Imagen Awards	2013	Best Actress – Television	The Wizards Return: Alex vs. Alex	Nominated	
Imagen Awards	2022	Best Actress – Comedy (Television)	Only Murders in the Building	Nominated	
Imagen Awards	2025	Best Actress – Comedy (Television)	Only Murders in the Building	Nominated	
Imagen Awards	2026	Best Actor – Comedy (Television)	Only Murders in the Building	Nominated	
IndieWire Honors	2024	Spotlight Award	Emilia Pérez	Won	
Ischia Global Film & Music Festival	2014	Ischia Kids Global Icon Award	Selena Gomez	Won	
The JED Foundation Gala (Note: The JED Foundation Gala honors organizations and individuals that have demonstrated exceptional leadership in the field of mental health and suicide prevention.)	2023	Voice of Mental Health Award	Selena Gomez	Won	
Joox Indonesia Music Awards	2021	Global Song of the Year	"Ice Cream" (with Blackpink)	Nominated	
Kora Awards	2025	Best Collaboration of the Year	"Calm Down" (with Rema)	Nominated	
Las Culturistas Culture Awards (Note: The Las Culturistas Culture Awards are an annual comedic pop culture parody awards show.)	2024	Record of the Year	"Single Soon"	Nominated	
Las Vegas Film Critics Society Sierra Awards	2024	Best Ensemble	Emilia Pérez	Nominated	
Latin American Music Awards	2015	Favorite Dance Song	"I Want You to Know" (Zedd featuring Selena Gomez)	Won	
Latin American Music Awards	2017	Favorite Crossover Artist	Selena Gomez	Won	
Latin American Music Awards	2019	Song of the Year	"Taki Taki" (DJ Snake featuring Selena Gomez, Ozuna & Cardi B)	Won	
Latin American Music Awards	2019	Favorite Urban Song	"Taki Taki" (DJ Snake featuring Selena Gomez, Ozuna & Cardi B)	Won	
Latin American Music Awards	2021	Favorite Video	"De Una Vez"	Won	
Latin American Music Awards	2021	Social Artist of the Year	Selena Gomez	Nominated	
Latin American Music Awards	2022	Favorite Female Artist	Selena Gomez	Nominated	
Latin American Music Awards	2022	Favorite Pop Artist	Selena Gomez	Won	
Latin American Music Awards	2022	Favorite Pop Album	Revelación	Nominated	
Latino Entertainment Journalists Association Film Awards (Note: These awards are administered by the Latino Entertainment Journalists Association.)	2025	Best Supporting Actress	Emilia Pérez	Nominated	
Latino Entertainment Journalists Association Film Awards	2025	Best Ensemble Casting	Emilia Pérez	Nominated	
Lo Nuestro Awards	2019	Crossover Collaboration of the Year	"Taki Taki" (DJ Snake featuring Selena Gomez, Ozuna & Cardi B)	Won	
Lo Nuestro Awards	2020	Crossover Collaboration of the Year	"I Can't Get Enough" (with Benny Blanco, Tainy and J Balvin)	Nominated	
Lo Nuestro Awards	2022	Pop Solo Artist of the Year	Selena Gomez	Nominated	
Lo Nuestro Awards	2022	Pop Collaboration of the Year	"Baila Conmigo" (with Rauw Alejandro)	Nominated	
Lo Nuestro Awards	2022	Pop Album of the Year	Revelación	Nominated	
The Lockdown Awards (Note: The Lockdown Awards presented by LiveOne is an award focuses on performances that took place virtually or in large outdoor areas during the COVID-19 pandemic.)	2020	Musicians Not Playing Music	Selena + Chef	Nominated	
Los40 Music Awards	2017	International Video of the Year	"It Ain't Me" (with Kygo)	Won	
Los40 Music Awards	2018	International Artist or Group of the Year	Selena Gomez	Nominated	
Los40 Music Awards	2019	LOS40 Global Show Song	"Taki Taki" (DJ Snake featuring Selena Gomez, Ozuna & Cardi B)	Nominated	
Lunas del Auditorio	2012	Best Foreign Language Pop Artist	Selena Gomez	Nominated	
Make-A-Wish Foundation	2013	Chris Greicius Celebrity Award	Selena Gomez	Won	
McLean Award	2019	McLean Award for Mental Health Advocacy	Selena Gomez	Won	
Meus Prêmios Nick	2012	Favorite International Artist	Selena Gomez	Nominated	
Meus Prêmios Nick	2013	Favorite International Artist	Selena Gomez	Nominated	
Meus Prêmios Nick	2014	Favorite Fandom	Selena Gomez	Nominated	
Meus Prêmios Nick	2016	Favorite International Artist	Selena Gomez	Nominated	
Meus Prêmios Nick	2017	Favorite International Hit	"Bad Liar"	Won	
Meus Prêmios Nick	2017	Favorite International Instagrammer	Selena Gomez	Nominated	
Meus Prêmios Nick	2018	Favorite International Artist	Selena Gomez	Nominated	
Mill Valley Film Festival	2024	Outstanding Ensemble Performance	Emilia Pérez	Won	
MTV Europe Music Awards	2011	Biggest Fans	Selena Gomez	Nominated	
MTV Europe Music Awards	2013	Best Female	Selena Gomez	Nominated	
MTV Europe Music Awards	2016	Best Pop	Selena Gomez	Nominated	
MTV Europe Music Awards	2018	Biggest Fans	Selena Gomez	Nominated	
MTV Europe Music Awards	2020	Best Collaboration	"Ice Cream" (with Blackpink)	Nominated	
MTV Europe Music Awards	2023	Best Song	"Calm Down" (with Rema)	Nominated	
MTV Europe Music Awards	2023	Best Collaboration	"Calm Down" (with Rema)	Nominated	
MTV Europe Music Awards	2023	Biggest Fans	Selena Gomez	Nominated	
MTV Italian Music Awards	2014	Artist Saga	Selena Gomez	Nominated	
MTV Italian Music Awards	2015	Top Instagram Star	Selena Gomez	Nominated	
MTV Italian Music Awards	2015	Artist Saga	Selena Gomez	Nominated	
MTV Italian Music Awards	2016	Best International Female	Selena Gomez	Nominated	
MTV Italian Music Awards	2016	Artist Saga	Selena Gomez	Nominated	
MTV Italian Music Awards	2016	MTV Awards Star	Selena Gomez	Nominated	
MTV Italian Music Awards	2017	Artist Saga	Selena Gomez	Nominated	
MTV Italian Music Awards	2017	MTV Awards Star	Selena Gomez	Nominated	
MTV MIAW Awards	2013	Celebrity Without Filter on Instagram	Selena Gomez	Nominated	
MTV MIAW Awards	2014	Global Instagram Star	Selena Gomez	Nominated	
MTV MIAW Awards	2017	Global Instagrammer	Selena Gomez	Nominated	
MTV MIAW Awards	2018	Collaboration of the Year	"Wolves" (with Marshmello)	Nominated	
MTV MIAW Awards	2018	Global Instagrammer	Selena Gomez	Nominated	
MTV MIAW Awards	2019	Fandom	Selena Gomez	Nominated	
MTV MIAW Awards	2019	Music Ship of the Year	"Taki Taki" (DJ Snake featuring Selena Gomez, Ozuna & Cardi B)	Won	
MTV MIAW Awards	2021	Music Ship of the Year	"Baila Conmigo" (with Rauw Alejandro)	Won	
MTV MIAW Awards Brazil	2018	International Hit	"Bad Liar"	Nominated	
MTV MIAW Awards Brazil	2018	Shade of the Year	Justin Bieber and Selena Gomez vs. Selena's Mother	Nominated	
MTV MIAW Awards Brazil	2018	Fandom of the Year	Selena Gomez	Nominated	
MTV MIAW Awards Brazil	2019	Hit Global	"Taki Taki" (DJ Snake featuring Selena Gomez, Ozuna & Cardi B)	Nominated	
MTV Movie & TV Awards	2021	Best New Unscripted Series	Selena + Chef	Won	
MTV Movie & TV Awards	2022	Best Team (Note: Shared with Steve Martin and Martin Short.)	Only Murders in the Building	Nominated	
MTV Movie & TV Awards	2022	Best Lifestyle Show	Selena + Chef	Won	
MTV Movie & TV Awards	2023	Best Performance in a Show	Only Murders in the Building	Nominated	
MTV Movie & TV Awards	2023	Best Kiss (Note: Shared with Cara Delevingne.)	Only Murders in the Building	Nominated	
MTV Movie & TV Awards	2023	Best Music Documentary	Selena Gomez: My Mind & Me	Won	
MTV Video Music Awards	2012	Best Female Video (Note: "Love You like a Love Song" is a single by the group Selena Gomez & The Scene. However, this category rewards the best video by a female artist, and not by a group.)	"Love You like a Love Song"	Nominated	
MTV Video Music Awards	2013	Best Pop Video	"Come & Get It"	Won	
MTV Video Music Awards	2013	Song of Summer	"Come & Get It"	Nominated	
MTV Video Music Awards	2015	Song of Summer	"Good for You" (featuring ASAP Rocky)	Nominated	
MTV Video Music Awards	2016	Song of Summer	"Kill Em with Kindness"	Nominated	
MTV Video Music Awards	2017	Best Collaboration	"We Don't Talk Anymore" (Charlie Puth featuring Selena Gomez)	Nominated	
MTV Video Music Awards	2017	Best Dance	"It Ain't Me" (with Kygo)	Nominated	
MTV Video Music Awards	2019	Best Latin	"I Can't Get Enough" (with Benny Blanco, Tainy and J Balvin)	Nominated	
MTV Video Music Awards	2019	Best Dance	"Taki Taki" (DJ Snake featuring Selena Gomez, Ozuna & Cardi B)	Nominated	
MTV Video Music Awards	2020	Best Art Direction	"Boyfriend"	Nominated	
MTV Video Music Awards	2021	Best K-Pop	"Ice Cream" (with Blackpink)	Nominated	
MTV Video Music Awards	2023	Song of the Year	"Calm Down" (with Rema)	Nominated	
MTV Video Music Awards	2023	Best Collaboration	"Calm Down" (with Rema)	Nominated	
MTV Video Music Awards	2023	Best Afrobeats	"Calm Down" (with Rema)	Won	
MTV Video Music Awards	2025	Best Collaboration	"Sunset Blvd" (with Benny Blanco)	Nominated	
MTV Video Music Awards	2025	Video for Good	"Younger and Hotter Than Me" (with Benny Blanco)	Nominated	
Music Video Festival Awards (Note: The Music Video Festival Awards (stylized as m-v-f- awards) is a Brazil-based festival and award ceremony honoring excellence in music video production.)	2021	Best International Music Video – Audience Choice	"Baila Conmigo" (with Rauw Alejandro)	Won	
Music Video Festival Awards	2021	Best International Music Video – Audience Choice	"Selfish Love" (with DJ Snake)	Nominated	
Musikförläggarnas pris	2021	Song of the Year	"Lose You to Love Me"	Nominated	
NAACP Image Awards	2009	Outstanding Performance in a Youth/Children's Program – Series or Special	Wizards of Waverly Place	Nominated	
NAACP Image Awards	2010	Outstanding Performance in a Youth/Children's Program – Series or Special	Wizards of Waverly Place	Nominated	
NAACP Image Awards	2011	Outstanding Performance in a Youth/Children's Program – Series or Special	Wizards of Waverly Place	Nominated	
NewNowNext Awards	2013	Triple Play	Selena Gomez	Won	
New York Film Critics Online Awards	2024	Best Ensemble	Emilia Pérez	Nominated	
Nickelodeon Argentina Kids' Choice Awards	2011	Favorite International Artist or Group	Selena Gomez	Won	
Nickelodeon Argentina Kids' Choice Awards	2017	Favorite Collaboration	"It Ain't Me" (with Kygo)	Nominated	
Nickelodeon Australian Kids' Choice Awards	2009	Fave International TV Star	Wizards of Waverly Place	Nominated	
Nickelodeon Australian Kids' Choice Awards	2010	Fave TV Star	Wizards of Waverly Place	Won	
Nickelodeon Australian Kids' Choice Awards	2011	Fave TV Star	Wizards of Waverly Place	Won	
Nickelodeon Australian Kids' Choice Awards	2014	Aussies' Fave Hottie	Selena Gomez	Nominated	
Nickelodeon Colombia Kids' Choice Awards	2014	Favorite International Artist or Group	Selena Gomez	Nominated	
Nickelodeon Colombia Kids' Choice Awards	2017	Favorite International Artist or Group	Selena Gomez	Nominated	
Nickelodeon Colombia Kids' Choice Awards	2017	Favorite Collaboration	"It Ain't Me" (with Kygo)	Nominated	
Nickelodeon Kids' Choice Awards	2009	Favorite TV Actress	Wizards of Waverly Place	Won	
Nickelodeon Kids' Choice Awards	2010	Favorite TV Actress	Wizards of Waverly Place	Won	
Nickelodeon Kids' Choice Awards	2011	Favorite TV Actress	Wizards of Waverly Place	Won	
Nickelodeon Kids' Choice Awards	2011	Favorite Female Artist	Selena Gomez	Nominated	
Nickelodeon Kids' Choice Awards	2012	Favorite TV Actress	Wizards of Waverly Place	Won	
Nickelodeon Kids' Choice Awards	2012	Favorite Female Artist	Selena Gomez	Won	
Nickelodeon Kids' Choice Awards	2013	Favorite TV Actress	Wizards of Waverly Place	Won	
Nickelodeon Kids' Choice Awards	2014	Favorite Female Artist	Selena Gomez	Won	
Nickelodeon Kids' Choice Awards	2014	KCA Fan Army	Selena Gomez	Won	
Nickelodeon Kids' Choice Awards	2015	Favorite Female Artist	Selena Gomez	Won	
Nickelodeon Kids' Choice Awards	2016	Favorite Voice from an Animated Movie	Hotel Transylvania 2	Nominated	
Nickelodeon Kids' Choice Awards	2016	Favorite Female Artist	Selena Gomez	Nominated	
Nickelodeon Kids' Choice Awards	2016	Favorite Collaboration	"Good for You" (featuring ASAP Rocky)	Nominated	
Nickelodeon Kids' Choice Awards	2017	Favorite Female Artist	Selena Gomez	Won	
Nickelodeon Kids' Choice Awards	2018	Favorite Female Artist	Selena Gomez	Nominated	
Nickelodeon Kids' Choice Awards	2018	Favorite Song	"It Ain't Me" (with Kygo)	Nominated	
Nickelodeon Kids' Choice Awards	2019	Favorite Female Voice from an Animated Movie	Hotel Transylvania 3: Summer Vacation	Won	
Nickelodeon Kids' Choice Awards	2019	Favorite Female Artist	Selena Gomez	Nominated	
Nickelodeon Kids' Choice Awards	2020	Favorite Female Artist	Selena Gomez	Nominated	
Nickelodeon Kids' Choice Awards	2021	Favorite Female Artist	Selena Gomez	Nominated	
Nickelodeon Kids' Choice Awards	2021	Favorite Music Collaboration	"Ice Cream" (with Blackpink)	Nominated	
Nickelodeon Kids' Choice Awards	2023	Favorite Voice from an Animated Movie (Female)	Hotel Transylvania: Transformania	Won	
Nickelodeon Kids' Choice Awards	2024	Favorite Female Artist	Selena Gomez	Nominated	
Nickelodeon Kids' Choice Awards	2025	Favorite Female Artist	Selena Gomez	Nominated	
Nickelodeon Kids' Choice Awards	2025	Favorite Music Collaboration	"Call Me When You Break Up" (with Benny Blanco and Gracie Abrams)	Nominated	
Nickelodeon Kids' Choice Awards	2025	Favorite Album	I Said I Love You First (with Benny Blanco)	Nominated	
Nickelodeon Kids' Choice Awards	2025	Favorite Viral Song	"Bluest Flame" (with Benny Blanco)	Won	
Nickelodeon Mexico Kids' Choice Awards	2010	Favorite International Female Character	Wizards of Waverly Place	Nominated	
Nickelodeon Mexico Kids' Choice Awards	2013	Favorite International Artist or Group	Selena Gomez	Nominated	
Nickelodeon Mexico Kids' Choice Awards	2015	Favorite International Artist or Group	Selena Gomez	Nominated	
Nickelodeon Mexico Kids' Choice Awards	2017	Favorite Collaboration	"It Ain't Me" (with Kygo)	Nominated	
Nickelodeon Mexico Kids' Choice Awards	2018	Favorite Collaboration	"Wolves" (with Marshmello)	Nominated	
Nickelodeon Mexico Kids' Choice Awards	2021	Global Hit	"Baila Conmigo" (with Rauw Alejandro)	Nominated	
Nickelodeon Mexico Kids' Choice Awards	2023	Favorite International Artist	Selena Gomez	Nominated	
NRJ DJ Awards (Note: The NRJ DJ Awards were established in 2012 by the French radio station NRJ to honor the best DJs in the French and worldwide music industry.)	2019	Hit Club of the Year	"Taki Taki" (DJ Snake featuring Selena Gomez, Ozuna & Cardi B)	Nominated	
NRJ Music Awards	2017	International Female Artist of the Year	Selena Gomez	Won	
NRJ Music Awards	2018	International Female Artist of the Year	Selena Gomez	Nominated	
NRJ Music Awards	2021	International Collaboration of the Year	"Selfish Love" (with DJ Snake)	Nominated	
NRJ Music Awards	2021	Video of the Year	"Selfish Love" (with DJ Snake)	Nominated	
NRJ Music Awards	2022	International Collaboration of the Year	"Calm Down" (with Rema)	Nominated	
NRJ Music Awards	2022	International Video of the Year	"Let Somebody Go" (with Coldplay)	Nominated	
O Music Awards	2012	Best Artist with a Cameraphone	Selena Gomez	Won	
O Music Awards	2013	Fan Army FTW	Selena Gomez	Nominated	
Palm Springs International Film Festival	2025	Vanguard Award (Note: The Vanguard Award honors the collective work of a film's cast and director.)	Emilia Pérez	Won	
People	2026	Beauty Impact Award	Selena Gomez	Won	
People's Choice Awards	2013	Favorite Music Fan Following	Selena Gomez	Nominated	
People's Choice Awards	2014	Favorite Female Artist	Selena Gomez	Nominated	
People's Choice Awards	2016	Favorite Animated Movie Voice	Hotel Transylvania 2	Won	
People's Choice Awards	2016	Favorite Female Artist	Selena Gomez	Nominated	
People's Choice Awards	2016	Favorite Pop Artist	Selena Gomez	Nominated	
People's Choice Awards	2018	Song of the Year	"Back to You"	Nominated	
People's Choice Awards	2018	Music Video of the Year	"Back to You"	Nominated	
People's Choice Awards	2018	Social Celebrity of the Year	Selena Gomez	Nominated	
People's Choice Awards	2020	Music Video of the Year	"Ice Cream" (with Blackpink)	Nominated	
People's Choice Awards	2020	Soundtrack Song of the Year	"Rare" (from Normal People)	Nominated	
People's Choice Awards	2020	Social Celebrity of the Year	Selena Gomez	Nominated	
People's Choice Awards	2021	Comedy TV Star of the Year	Only Murders in the Building	Won	
People's Choice Awards	2022	Female TV Star of the Year	Only Murders in the Building	Nominated	
People's Choice Awards	2022	Comedy TV Star of the Year	Only Murders in the Building	Won	
People's Choice Awards	2022	Music Video of the Year	"Let Somebody Go" (with Coldplay)	Nominated	
People's Choice Awards	2022	Social Celebrity of the Year	Selena Gomez	Won	
People's Choice Awards	2024	Female TV Star of the Year	Only Murders in the Building	Won	
People's Choice Awards	2024	Comedy TV Star of the Year	Only Murders in the Building	Nominated	
People's Choice Awards	2024	Social Celebrity of the Year	Selena Gomez	Nominated	
PETA's Libby Awards (Note: PETA's Libby Awards are annual honors recognizing young public figures, brands, and products that advance animal rights.)	2020	Heroes — Favorite Vegan Makeup Line	Rare Beauty	Won	
PETA's Libby Awards	2023	Heroes — Favorite Celeb Cruelty-Free Beauty Brand	Rare Beauty	Nominated	
Pollstar Awards	2021	Latin Touring Artist of the Decade	Selena Gomez	Nominated	
Prêmio Jovem Brasileiro	2019	Me Gusta	"Taki Taki" (DJ Snake featuring Selena Gomez, Ozuna & Cardi B)	Nominated	
Premios Juventud	2019	This Is a BTS	"I Can't Get Enough" (with Benny Blanco, Tainy and J Balvin)	Nominated	
Premios Juventud	2019	This Is a BTS	"Taki Taki" (DJ Snake featuring Selena Gomez, Ozuna & Cardi B)	Won	
Premios Juventud	2021	OMG Collaboration	"Baila Conmigo" (with Rauw Alejandro)	Nominated	
Premios Juventud	2021	The Traffic Jam	"Baila Conmigo" (with Rauw Alejandro)	Nominated	
Premios Juventud	2021	Helping Your Fans	Selena Gomez	Nominated	
Premios Juventud	2025	OMG Collaboration	"Ojos Tristes" (with Benny Blanco and The Marías)	Won	
Premios People en Español (Note: Premios People en Español was a reader-voted awards program introduced by People en Español in 2009, recognizing achievements across music, film, television, and sports.)	2010	Best Latin Actor/Actress in an English-language Series	Wizards of Waverly Place	Won	
Premios People en Español	2011	Best Latin Actor/Actress in an English-language Series	Wizards of Waverly Place	Nominated	
Premios People en Español	2012	Best Female Singer	Selena Gomez	Nominated	
Premios People en Español	2012	Queen of Facebook	Selena Gomez	Nominated	
Premios People en Español	2013	Song of the Year	"Come & Get It"	Nominated	
Premios People en Español	2013	Best Female Singer	Selena Gomez	Nominated	
Premios Quiero	2021	Best Collaboration	"999" (with Camilo)	Nominated	
Premios Tu Música Urbano	2019	Urban Pop Song	"Taki Taki" (DJ Snake featuring Selena Gomez, Ozuna & Cardi B)	Nominated	
Radio Disney Music Awards	2013	Best Female Artist	Selena Gomez	Won	
Radio Disney Music Awards	2013	Fiercest Fans	Selena Gomez	Nominated	
Radio Disney Music Awards	2014	Song of the Year	"Come & Get It"	Won	
Radio Disney Music Awards	2014	Most Talked About Artist	Selena Gomez	Won	
Radio Disney Music Awards	2014	Song to Dance to	"Birthday"	Won	
Radio Disney Music Awards	2015	Best Breakup Song	"The Heart Wants What It Wants"	Won	
Radio Disney Music Awards	2016	Best Female Artist	Selena Gomez	Won	
Radio Disney Music Awards	2017	Best Female Artist	Selena Gomez	Nominated	
Radio Disney Music Awards	2017	Fiercest Fans	Selena Gomez	Nominated	
Radio Disney Music Awards	2017	Best Breakup Song	"We Don't Talk Anymore" (Charlie Puth featuring Selena Gomez)	Nominated	
Radio Disney Music Awards	2017	Best Collaboration	"We Don't Talk Anymore" (Charlie Puth featuring Selena Gomez)	Nominated	
Radio Disney Music Awards	2017	Favorite Tour	Revival Tour	Won	
Radio Disney Music Awards	2018	Best Artist	Selena Gomez	Nominated	
Radio Disney Music Awards	2018	Song of the Year	"Wolves" (with Marshmello)	Nominated	
Radio Disney Music Awards	2018	Fiercest Fans	Selena Gomez	Nominated	
Radio Disney Music Awards	2018	Best Collaboration	"It Ain't Me" (with Kygo)	Won	
Realscreen Awards	2022	Lifestyle – Studio-based Food Program	Selena + Chef	Won	
Realscreen Awards	2022	Reality – Structured Reality	Selena + Chef	Nominated	
Realscreen Awards	2023	Lifestyle – Studio-based Food Program	Selena + Chef	Won	
Realscreen Awards	2024	Lifestyle – Studio-based Food	Selena + Chef	Won	
Rockbjörnen	2017	This Year's Foreign Song	"It Ain't Me" (with Kygo)	Nominated	
RTHK International Pop Poll Awards	2017	Top Ten International Gold Songs	"We Don't Talk Anymore" (Charlie Puth featuring Selena Gomez)	Won	
RTHK International Pop Poll Awards	2022	Top Ten International Gold Songs	"Let Somebody Go" (with Coldplay)	Nominated	
RTHK International Pop Poll Awards	2022	Top Female Singers	Selena Gomez	Bronze	
RTHK International Pop Poll Awards	2023	Top Ten International Gold Songs	"My Mind & Me"	Nominated	
RTHK International Pop Poll Awards	2023	Top Female Singers	Selena Gomez	Nominated	
RTHK International Pop Poll Awards	2024	Top Ten International Gold Songs	"Single Soon"	Nominated	
RTHK International Pop Poll Awards	2024	Top Ten International Gold Songs	"Love On"	Nominated	
RTHK International Pop Poll Awards	2024	Top Female Singers	Selena Gomez	Nominated	
Ruderman Family Foundation	2022	Morton E. Ruderman Award in Inclusion	Selena Gomez	Won	
Santa Barbara International Film Festival	2025	Virtuosos Award	Emilia Pérez	Won	
Satellite Awards	2022	Best Actress in a Television Series – Musical or Comedy	Only Murders in the Building	Nominated	
Satellite Awards	2023	Best Actress in a Television Series – Musical or Comedy	Only Murders in the Building	Won	
Satellite Awards	2024	Best Actress in a Television Series – Musical or Comedy	Only Murders in the Building	Nominated	
Satellite Awards	2025 (Note: Note: "Mi camino" (from: Emilia Pérez), performed by Gomez, won Best Original Song at the 29th Satellite Awards, however in this category the nomination is credited to the songwriters and not the performer. The song was written by Clément Ducol and Camille.)	Best Actress in a Television Series – Musical or Comedy	Only Murders in the Building	Nominated	
Satellite Awards	2026	Best Actress in a Television Series – Musical or Comedy	Only Murders in the Building	Nominated	
Shorty Awards	2011	Celebrity	Selena Gomez	Nominated	
Shorty Awards	2012	Actress	Selena Gomez	Won	
Shorty Awards	2012	Celebrity	Selena Gomez	Nominated	
Shorty Awards	2013	Actress	Selena Gomez	Won (Note: Tied with Tara Strong.)	
Shorty Awards	2013	Celebrity Fashion	Selena Gomez	Won (Note: Tied with Sophia Abrahão.)	
Shorty Awards	2016	Singer	Selena Gomez	Nominated	
Social Impact Summit and FIT Foundation (Note: The Social Impact Summit is an event organized by the Social Impact Fund that brings together figures from entertainment and philanthropy to discuss social impact initiatives. It has been co-hosted with The Hollywood Reporter in Los Angeles and with the Fashion Institute of Technology Foundation in New York City.)	2026	Excellence in Beauty Philanthropy Award	Selena Gomez	Won	
Social Star Awards (Note: The Social Star Award is an award which recognised "the biggest stars of social media".)	2013	Most Popular Actor/Actress	Selena Gomez	Won	
Spellemannprisen	2018	Song of the Year	"It Ain't Me" (with Kygo)	Nominated	
Stanford Healthcare Innovation Lab	2022	Mental Health Innovations Award for Excellence in Mental Health Advocacy	Selena Gomez	Won	
Teen Choice Awards	2009	Choice Summer TV Star: Female	Princess Protection Program and Wizards of Waverly Place	Won	
Teen Choice Awards	2009	Choice Red Carpet Fashion Icon – Female	Selena Gomez	Won	
Teen Choice Awards	2009	Choice Celebrity Dancer	Selena Gomez	Won	
Teen Choice Awards	2010	Choice Summer Movie Star – Female	Ramona and Beezus	Nominated	
Teen Choice Awards	2010	Choice TV Actress Comedy	Wizards of Waverly Place	Won	
Teen Choice Awards	2010	Choice Red Carpet Fashion Icon – Female	Selena Gomez	Won	
Teen Choice Awards	2011	Choice Summer Movie Star – Female	Monte Carlo	Nominated	
Teen Choice Awards	2011	Choice Summer Music Star: Female	Selena Gomez	Nominated	
Teen Choice Awards	2011	Choice TV Actress Comedy	Wizards of Waverly Place	Won	
Teen Choice Awards	2011	Choice Female Hottie	Selena Gomez	Won	
Teen Choice Awards	2012	Choice Female Hottie	Selena Gomez	Nominated	
Teen Choice Awards	2013	Choice Music – Female Artist	Selena Gomez	Nominated	
Teen Choice Awards	2013	Choice Music Single – Female	"Come & Get It"	Nominated	
Teen Choice Awards	2013	Choice Music – Break-Up Song	"Come & Get It"	Won	
Teen Choice Awards	2013	Choice Summer Music Star: Female	Selena Gomez	Won	
Teen Choice Awards	2013	Choice Female Hottie	Selena Gomez	Won	
Teen Choice Awards	2013	Choice Smile	Selena Gomez	Nominated	
Teen Choice Awards	2014	Ultimate Choice Award	Selena Gomez	Won	
Teen Choice Awards	2014	Choice Female Hottie	Selena Gomez	Won	
Teen Choice Awards	2014	Choice Instagrammer	Selena Gomez	Nominated	
Teen Choice Awards	2014	Choice Smile	Selena Gomez	Nominated	
Teen Choice Awards	2015	Choice Music – Female Artist	Selena Gomez	Nominated	
Teen Choice Awards	2015	Choice Female Hottie	Selena Gomez	Nominated	
Teen Choice Awards	2015	Choice Music – Break-Up Song	"The Heart Wants What It Wants"	Nominated	
Teen Choice Awards	2015	Choice Party Song	"I Want You to Know" (Zedd featuring Selena Gomez)	Nominated	
Teen Choice Awards	2015	Choice Music – Summer Song	"Good for You" (featuring ASAP Rocky)	Nominated	
Teen Choice Awards	2015	Choice Summer Music Star: Female	Selena Gomez	Nominated	
Teen Choice Awards	2015	Social Media Queen	Selena Gomez	Nominated	
Teen Choice Awards	2015	Choice Instagrammer	Selena Gomez	Nominated	
Teen Choice Awards	2016	Choice Music – Female Artist	Selena Gomez	Won	
Teen Choice Awards	2016	Choice Music Single – Female	"Hands to Myself"	Nominated	
Teen Choice Awards	2016	Choice Music – Love Song	"Hands to Myself"	Nominated	
Teen Choice Awards	2016	Choice Music – Break-Up Song	"Same Old Love"	Nominated	
Teen Choice Awards	2016	Choice Music – Break-Up Song	"We Don't Talk Anymore" (Charlie Puth featuring Selena Gomez)	Nominated	
Teen Choice Awards	2016	Choice Music – Summer Tour	Revival Tour	Nominated	
Teen Choice Awards	2016	Choice Summer Music Star: Female	Selena Gomez	Won	
Teen Choice Awards	2016	Choice Instagrammer	Selena Gomez	Won	
Teen Choice Awards	2016	Choice Female Hottie	Selena Gomez	Nominated	
Teen Choice Awards	2017	Choice Music – Female Artist	Selena Gomez	Nominated	
Teen Choice Awards	2017	Choice Summer Music Star: Female	Selena Gomez	Nominated	
Teen Choice Awards	2017	Choice Music Single – Female	"Bad Liar"	Nominated	
Teen Choice Awards	2017	Choice Music – Summer Song	"Bad Liar"	Nominated	
Teen Choice Awards	2017	Choice Electronic/Dance Song	"It Ain't Me" (with Kygo)	Nominated	
Teen Choice Awards	2017	Choice Music – Collaboration	"It Ain't Me" (with Kygo)	Nominated	
Teen Choice Awards	2017	Choice Changemaker	Selena Gomez	Nominated	
Teen Choice Awards	2017	Choice Style Icon	Selena Gomez	Nominated	
Teen Choice Awards	2017	Choice Female Hottie	Selena Gomez	Nominated	
Teen Choice Awards	2017	Choice Instagrammer	Selena Gomez	Won	
Teen Choice Awards	2017	Choice Snapchatter	Selena Gomez	Nominated	
Teen Choice Awards	2017	Choice Fandom	Selena Gomez	Nominated	
Teen Choice Awards	2018	Choice Music – Summer Song	"Back to You"	Won	
Teen Choice Awards	2018	Choice Summer Music Star: Female	Selena Gomez	Nominated	
Teen Choice Awards	2018	Choice Instagrammer	Selena Gomez	Won	
Teen Choice Awards	2018	Choice Female Hottie	Selena Gomez	Nominated	
Teen Choice Awards	2019	Choice Summer Movie Actress	The Dead Don't Die	Nominated	
Teen Choice Awards	2019	Choice Fandom	Selena Gomez	Nominated	
Telehit Awards	2011	International Youth Artist	Selena Gomez	Won	
Telehit Awards	2015	Best Female Artist	Selena Gomez	Nominated	
Telehit Awards	2016	Best Female Artist	Selena Gomez	Nominated	
Telehit Awards	2017	Best Female Artist	Selena Gomez	Nominated	
Trace Awards & Festival	2023	Song of the Year	"Calm Down" (with Rema)	Won	
UK Music Video Awards	2021	Best Pop Video – International	"Baila Conmigo" (with Rauw Alejandro)	Nominated	
unite4:humanity Gala	2014	Young Visionary Award	Selena Gomez	Won	
Variety Hitmakers Awards	2022	Film Song of the Year	"My Mind & Me" (from Selena Gomez: My Mind & Me)	Won	
Virgin Media Awards (Note: The Virgin Media Awards is an online awards group.)	2013	Next Big Thing in 2013	Selena Gomez	Won	
WDM Radio Awards	2018	Best Global Track	"It Ain't Me" (with Kygo)	Nominated	
Webby Awards	2017	Celebrity/Fan — Social Content and Marketing	Revival Tour	Nominated	
Webby Awards	2018	Variety & Reality — Video	73 Questions With Selena Gomez — Vogue	Nominated	
Webby Awards	2021	Fashion & Beauty — Social	Rare Beauty — Makeup Made to Feel Good In	Won (Note: People's Voice winner)	
Webby Awards	2022	Fashion & Beauty — General Social	Rare Beauty	Won	
Webby Awards	2023	Health, Wellness & Lifestyle — Websites and Mobile Sites	Wondermind Newsletter — Wondermind (Note: Gomez co-founded the mental health media platform Wondermind.)	Won	
Webby Awards	2023	Community Engagement — Features (Social)	Rare Beauty	Nominated	
Webby Awards	2023	Fashion & Beauty — General Social (Social)	Rare Beauty	Won	
Webby Awards	2023	Fashion & Beauty — General Social (Social)	Rare Beauty	Won	
Webby Awards	2024	Fashion & Beauty — General Social (Social)	Rare Beauty, Best Social Brand Presence	Won	
Webby Awards	2024	Fashion & Beauty — General Social (Social)	Rare Beauty, Best Social Brand Presence	Won	
Webby Awards	2025	Fashion & Beauty — General Social (Social)	Rare Beauty — Best Social, Fashion & Beauty	Won	
Webby Awards	2025	Fashion & Beauty — General Social (Social)	Rare Beauty — Best Social, Fashion & Beauty	Won	
Webby Awards	2026	Music, General Video & Film (Video & Film)	I Said I Love You First... (Short Film) — Vevo Extended Play	Nominated	
Webby Awards	2026	Fashion & Beauty — General Social (Social)	Rare Beauty — Best Social, Fashion & Beauty	Won	
Webby Awards	2026	Fashion & Beauty — General Social (Social)	Rare Beauty — Best Social, Fashion & Beauty	Won	
Webby Awards	2026	Documentary (Limited-Series & Specials) (Podcasts)	Suspicious Minds: AI and Psychosis	Nominated	
Webby Awards	2026	Best New Podcast — News, Business & Society (Podcasts)	Suspicious Minds: AI and Psychosis	Nominated	
Weibo Starlight Awards (Note: The Weibo Starlight Awards are awards presented by the Chinese social media platform Weibo, recognizing entertainers, media outlets, and companies for their activity and influence on the platform.)	2021	Western Hall of Fame Award	Selena Gomez	Won	
Weibo Starlight Awards	2021	Favorite Collaboration	"Ice Cream" (with Blackpink)	Won	
Women's Image Network Awards	2011	Actress Feature Film	Ramona and Beezus	Nominated	
World Music Awards	2012 (Note: Nominations were revealed for the 2012 World Music Awards, but the event was ultimately cancelled.)	World's Best Entertainer of the Year	Selena Gomez	Nominated	
World Music Awards	2014	World's Best Female Artist	Selena Gomez	Nominated	
World Music Awards	2014	World's Best Live Act	Selena Gomez	Nominated	
World Music Awards	2014	World's Best Entertainer of the Year	Selena Gomez	Nominated	
World Music Awards	2014	World's Best Song	"Come & Get It"	Nominated	
World Music Awards	2014	World's Best Video	"Come & Get It"	Nominated	
World Music Awards	2014	World's Best Video	"Slow Down"	Nominated	
World Music Awards	2014	World's Best Song	"Slow Down"	Nominated	
WWD Beauty Inc Awards (Note: The WWD Beauty Inc Awards are annual awards presented by Women's Wear Daily recognizing achievements by entrepreneurs, brands, and professionals in the beauty industry.)	2020	Startup of the Year	Rare Beauty by Selena Gomez	Won	
WWD Beauty Inc Awards	2023	Pete Born Impact Award	Selena Gomez	Won	
WWD Beauty Inc Awards	2025	Innovator of the Year, Fragrance	Rare Beauty Fragrance	Won	
Young Artist Awards	2008	Best Young Ensemble in a TV Series	Wizards of Waverly Place	Nominated	
Young Artist Awards	2009	Best Performance in a TV Movie, Miniseries, or Special – Leading Young Actress	Another Cinderella Story	Won	
Young Artist Awards	2009	Best Performance in a TV Series (Comedy or Drama) – Leading Young Actress	Wizards of Waverly Place	Nominated	
Young Artist Awards	2009	Best Performance in a Voice-over Role	Horton Hears a Who!	Nominated	
Young Artist Awards	2010	Best Performance in a TV Movie, Miniseries, or Special – Leading Young Actress	Princess Protection Program	Nominated	
Young Hollywood Awards	2013	Fan Favorite Album	Stars Dance	Won	
Young Hollywood Awards	2013	Most Anticipated Tour	Stars Dance Tour	Won	
YouTube Music Awards	2013	Video of the Year	"Come & Get It"	Nominated	
Žebřík Music Awards	2017	Foreign Female Singer	Selena Gomez	Nominated	

== Other accolades ==
=== State honours ===
State honours for Gomez
Country or organization	Year	Award or Honor	Ref.
France	2024	Chevalier de l'Ordre des Arts et des Lettres	

=== Listicles ===
Name of publisher, name of listicle, year(s) listed, and placement result
Publisher	Listicle	Year(s)	Result	Ref.
Billboard	21 Under 21	2010–2011	3rd	
Billboard	21 Under 21	2012	6th	
Billboard	Money Makers	2016	47th	
Billboard	100 Best Songs of 2017	2017	1st ("Bad Liar")	
Billboard	The 100 Greatest Disneyverse Songs of All Time	2023	80th ("Send It On")	
Billboard	Top Women Artists of the 21st Century	2025	30th	
The Business of Fashion	BoF 500 (Note: Established in 2013, the BoF 500 is an annually updated index of influential figures in the global fashion industry. The selection is accompanied by an annual gala and has been recognized as a significant professional distinction within the fashion industry.)	2017	Placed	
CNBC	Changemakers	2026	Placed	
Create & Cultivate	Create & Cultivate 100 (Note: Established in 2017, the Create & Cultivate 100 is an annual list recognizing influential women across various industries, including business and entertainment. The program has also been accompanied by events celebrating its honorees.)	2022	Placed	
DoSomething.org	Celebs Gone Good (Note: Celebs Gone Good was an annual ranking published by DoSomething.org recognizing celebrities for their philanthropic activities and contributions to social causes.)	2012	9th	
Entertainment Weekly	Entertainers of the Year (tribute written by Édgar Ramírez)	2024	Placed	
Fast Company	Brands That Matter	2023	Placed (Rare Beauty)	
Forbes	30 Under 30 (named to "All-Star Alumni" in 2020)	2016	Placed	
Forbes	America's Richest Self-Made Women	2025	48th	
Forbes	Forbes 250: The Greatest Self-Made Americans	2026	220th	
¡Hola! Américas	Latina Powerhouse Top 100 (Note: Established in 2020, the Latina Powerhouse Top 100 is an annual editorial list published by ¡HOLA! Américas recognizing 100 influential Latina women across various fields, including entertainment, business, fashion, and sports. Since 2025, the initiative has also held an annual gala celebrating its honorees.)	2020–2021, 2025	Placed	
The Hollywood Reporter	Women in Entertainment Power 100	2022–2025	Placed	
The Hollywood Reporter	Latin Power List	2023, 2025	Placed	
Inc.	Female Founders 250	2024	Placed	
National Geographic	National Geographic 33 (under "Visionaries")	2025	Placed	
People	People of the Year	2020	Placed	
People en Español	Los 50 más bellos	2009, 2015–2016	Placed	
People en Español	Las 25 mujeres más poderosas	2024	Placed	
Rolling Stone	The 100 Best Songs of the 2010s	2019	39th ("Bad Liar")	
Rolling Stone	The 250 Greatest Songs of the 21st Century So Far	2025	130th ("Hands to Myself")	
Seventeen	The 17 Most Powerful Girls 21 & Under (Note: Gomez appeared on the cover of Seventeen's inaugural Power Issue, which celebrated the magazine's 70th anniversary.)	2014	1st	
Time	Time Firsts: Women Leaders Who Are Changing the World	2017	Placed	
Time	Time 100 (under "Artists" with tribute written by America Ferrera)	2020	Placed	
Time	Time 100 Most Influential Companies	2024	Placed (Rare Beauty)	
Variety	Latino Power List	2014	7th	
Variety	Young Hollywood Impact (named to "Alumni" in 2017)	2016	Placed	
Variety	Variety500	2017, 2021–2024	Placed	
W	Best Performances	2025	Placed	
WWD	50 Women in Power	2023	Placed	
WWD	The Top 100 Beauty Companies	2024	85th (Rare Beauty)	
WWD	The Top 100 Beauty Companies	2025	80th (Rare Beauty)	
WWD	Beauty Inc's Power Brands	2024–2026	Placed (Rare Beauty)	
TheWrap	Latino Power List	2023	Placed	
TheWrap	Changemakers	2024	Placed	

=== World records ===
Key
†	Indicates a now former world record holder

Name of publication, year the record was awarded, name of the record, and the name of the record holder
Publication	Year	World record	Record holder	Ref.
Guinness World Records	2009	Youngest UNICEF Goodwill Ambassador	Selena Gomez	
Guinness World Records	2015	Most Nickelodeon Kids' Choice Awards blimps won (female)	Selena Gomez	
Guinness World Records	2015	Most Nickelodeon Kids' Choice Awards blimps won by a female singer	Selena Gomez	
Guinness World Records	2016	† Most followers on Instagram	Selena Gomez	
Guinness World Records	2016	† Most followers on Instagram for a female	Selena Gomez	
Guinness World Records	2016	† Most followers on Instagram for a musician	Selena Gomez	
Guinness World Records	2016	† Most followers on Instagram for a female musician	Selena Gomez	
Guinness World Records	2016	† Most liked image on Instagram	Selena Gomez	
Guinness World Records	2016	Most likes for an actor on Facebook (female)	Selena Gomez	
Guinness World Records	2016	First person with 100 million followers on Instagram	Selena Gomez	
Guinness World Records	2017	Most followers on X (formerly Twitter) for an actor (female)	Selena Gomez	
Guinness World Records	2017	† Most Nickelodeon Kids' Choice Awards blimps won for Favorite Female Artist	Selena Gomez	
Guinness World Records	2017	Most followed female chart-topper on Musical.ly	Selena Gomez	
Guinness World Records	2018	Most followers on Instagram for an actor (female)	Selena Gomez	
Guinness World Records	2019	Most Nickelodeon Kids' Choice Awards won by an individual	Selena Gomez & Will Smith	
Guinness World Records	2023	Most followers on Instagram for a female	Selena Gomez	
Guinness World Records	2026	Most followers on Instagram for a female musician	Selena Gomez	

== See also ==
- Selena Gomez & the Scene awards and nominations
- List of awards and nominations received by Only Murders in the Building
- List of awards and nominations received by Wizards of Waverly Place
