= Teen Choice Award for Choice Female Hottie =

Entertainment award category

Teen Choice Award for Choice Female Hottie is one of many awards given at the Teen Choice Awards.

The following is a list of Teen Choice Awards winners and nominees for Choice Music - Female Hottie. Selena Gomez holds the record for 8 nominations and 3 wins. Britney Spears is the youngest winner in 2000 at the age of 18. Jennifer Lopez is the oldest winner in 2001 at the age of 32.

== Winners and nominees ==
=== 1999 ===
Year	Winner	Nominees	Ref.
1999	Jennifer Love Hewitt	Drew Barrymore; Kirsten Dunst; Sarah Michelle Gellar; Katie Holmes; Keri Russell; Britney Spears; Reese Witherspoon	

=== 2000s ===
Year	Winner	Nominees	Ref.
2000	Britney Spears	Christina Aguilera; Rachael Leigh Cook; Sarah Michelle Gellar; Jennifer Love Hewitt; Lil' Kim; Jennifer Lopez; Jessica Simpson	
2001	Jennifer Lopez	Aaliyah; Jessica Alba; Anna Kournikova; Lucy Liu; Tara Reid; Britney Spears; Gwen Stefani	
2002	Britney Spears	Jessica Alba; Jennifer Aniston; Beyoncé; Cameron Diaz; Sarah Michelle Gellar; Jennifer Lopez; Reese Witherspoon	
2003	Beyoncé	Jessica Alba; Hilary Duff; Amanda Bynes; Jennifer Garner; Jennifer Lopez; Britney Spears; Gwen Stefani	
2004	Jessica Simpson	Jessica Alba; Beyoncé; Kate Hudson; Keira Knightley; Rachel McAdams; Eva Mendes; Britney Spears	
2005	Rachel Bilson	Jessica Alba; Beyoncé; Angelina Jolie; Lindsay Lohan; Eva Longoria; Christina Milian; Jessica Simpson	
2006	Jessica Alba	Rachel Bilson; Scarlett Johansson; Eva Longoria; Rihanna; Jessica Simpson	
2007	Jessica Alba	Jessica Biel; Megan Fox; Hayden Panettiere; Rihanna	
2008	Vanessa Hudgens	Megan Fox; Blake Lively; Hayden Panettiere; Rihanna	
2009	Megan Fox	Beyoncé; Miley Cyrus; Vanessa Hudgens; Blake Lively	

=== 2010s ===
Year	Winner	Nominees	Ref.
2010	Megan Fox	Jessica Biel; Scarlett Johansson; Kim Kardashian; Katy Perry	
2011	Selena Gomez	Nina Dobrev; Kim Kardashian; Minka Kelly; Mila Kunis	
2012	Miley Cyrus	Selena Gomez; Katy Perry; Rihanna; Kate Upton	
2013	Selena Gomez	Miley Cyrus; Megan Fox; Mila Kunis; Demi Lovato	
2014	Selena Gomez	Beyoncé; Ariana Grande; Kendall Jenner; Rihanna; Bella Thorne	
2015	Fifth Harmony	Miley Cyrus; Cara Delevingne; Selena Gomez; Rihanna; Taylor Swift	
2016	Kendall Jenner	Hailey Baldwin; Selena Gomez; Gigi Hadid; Demi Lovato; Bella Thorne	
2017	Camila Cabello	Selena Gomez; Paris Jackson; Deepika Padukone; Rihanna; Zendaya	
2018	Lauren Jauregui	Hailey Baldwin; Selena Gomez; Olivia Holt; Kendall Jenner; Yara Shahidi	
