= Teen Choice Award for Choice Summer Music Star: Female =

Entertainment award category

The following is a list of Teen Choice Award winners and nominees for Choice Summer Music Star: Female. It was first introduced in 2010. Selena Gomez, Demi Lovato, and Camila Cabello are the only artists to win this award twice.

== Winners and nominees ==
| Year | Winner | Nominees | Ref. |
|---|---|---|---|
| 2010 | Lady Gaga | Miley Cyrus; Kesha; Katy Perry; Rihanna | |
| 2011 | Katy Perry | Beyoncé; Selena Gomez; Demi Lovato; Britney Spears | |
| 2012 | Demi Lovato | Carly Rae Jepsen; Jennifer Lopez; Katy Perry; Rihanna | |
| 2013 | Selena Gomez | Miley Cyrus; Ariana Grande; P!nk; Rihanna | |
| 2014 | Demi Lovato | Iggy Azalea; Becky G; Ariana Grande; Nicki Minaj | |
| 2015 | Taylor Swift | Selena Gomez; Ariana Grande; Demi Lovato; Nicki Minaj; Rihanna | |
| 2016 | Selena Gomez | Ariana Grande; Demi Lovato; P!nk; Rihanna; Gwen Stefani | |
| 2017 | Camila Cabello | Miley Cyrus; Selena Gomez; Halsey; Lorde; Katy Perry | |
| 2018 | Camila Cabello | Cardi B; Selena Gomez; Ariana Grande; Halsey; Meghan Trainor | |
