= Billboard Latin Women in Music =

Latin music award honoring women

- Awarded for: "groundbreaking women who are shaping the future of Latin music"
- Country: United States
- Presented by: Billboard
- First award: 2023
- Currently held by: Rosalía (2026 Woman of the Year)
- Website: billboard.com/t/latin-women-in-music/

Television/radio coverage
- Network: Telemundo

Billboard Latin Women in Music is an annual event presented by Billboard magazine for "groundbreaking women who are shaping the future of Latin music". The event was created in 2023 as a "response to an exploding Latin music business that crossed borders and continents but was united in language and repertoire". Since its inception, the event has been broadcast by Telemundo.

Ana Gabriel, Emilia, Evaluna Montaner, Goyo, Thalía, and Shakira were among the first honorees at the inaugural event, with the latter being named Woman of the Year. Karol G and Selena Gomez, who have won Woman of the Year in 2024 and 2025 respectively, were also named Woman of the Year at the all-genre Billboard Women in Music awards in 2024 and 2017, respectively.

== List of honorees ==
Key
†	Indicates posthumous recipient

=== Woman of the Year Award ===
The Woman of the Year Award is presented to a "female artist who has demonstrated exceptional success, leadership and cultural influence in the music industry and beyond".

List of Woman of the Year Award recipients
Year	Image	Recipient	Nationality	Ref.
2023	Singer Shakira	Shakira	Colombia	
2024	Singer Karol G	Karol G	Colombia	
2025	Entertainer Selena Gomez	Selena Gomez	United States	
2026	Entertainer Rosalía	Rosalía	Spain	

=== Legend Award ===
The Legend Award is presented to artists who have left a "unique and immeasurable legacy and have significantly impacted the industry throughout their careers with their musical work".

List of Legend Award recipients
Year	Image	Recipient	Nationality	Ref.
2023	Singer Ana Gabriel	Ana Gabriel	Mexico	
2024	Singer Gloria Estefan	Gloria Estefan	Cuba; United States	
2025	Singer Celia Cruz	Celia Cruz †	Cuba; United States	

=== Rising Star Award ===
The Rising Star Award recognizes "an emerging talent’s success in growing their musical prowess and solidifying their place in the industry".

List of Rising Star Award recipients
Year	Image	Recipient	Nationality	Ref.
2023	Singer Emilia	Emilia	Argentina	
2024	Singer Kali Uchis	Kali Uchis	United States	

=== Visionary Award ===
The Visionary Award is presented to an artist for "developing a sound and aesthetic that are intensely personal, are all her own, and cross genres and styles".

List of Visionary Award recipients
Year	Image	Recipient	Nationality	Ref.
2023	Singer María Becerra	María Becerra	Argentina	

=== Tradition and Future Award ===
The Tradition and Future Award is presented to an artist for "maintaining alive the musical and artistic tradition of her family".

List of Tradition and Future Award recipients
Year	Image	Recipient	Nationality	Ref.
2023	Singer Evaluna Montaner	Evaluna Montaner	Venezuela	

=== Musical Dynasty Award ===
The Musical Dynasty Award is presented an artist for "continuing the legacy of an emblematic family".

List of Musical Dynasty recipients
Year	Image	Recipient	Nationality	Ref.
2024	Singer Ángela Aguilar	Ángela Aguilar	Mexico; United States	

=== Agent of Change Award ===
The Agent of Change Award is presented to an artist for "shining a positive light through her music and activism on equal rights".

List of Agent of Change Award recipients
Year	Image	Recipient	Nationality	Ref.
2023	Singer Goyo	Goyo	Colombia	

=== Global Powerhouse Award ===
The Global Powerhouse Award is presented to an artist for their "indelible contributions in the Latin pop field for more than three decades".

List of Global Powerhouse Award recipients
Year	Image	Recipient	Nationality	Ref.
2023	Singer Thalía	Thalía	Mexico	

=== Global Impact Award ===
The Global Impact Award is presented to an artist who has an "exceptional ability to connect with audiences worldwide, not only through their music but also by positively influencing popular culture, as well as serving as ambassadors of Latin culture on a global scale".

List of Global Impact Award recipients
Year	Image	Recipient	Nationality	Ref.
2024	Singer Camila Cabello	Camila Cabello	United States	
2026	Singer Becky G	Becky G	United States	

=== Lifetime Achievement Award ===
The Lifetime Achievement Award is presented to an artist for their musical trajectory.

List of Lifetime Achieve Award recipients
Year	Image	Recipient	Nationality	Ref.
2024	Singer Ana Bárbara	Ana Bárbara	Mexico	
2025	Singer Olga Tañón	Olga Tañón	Puerto Rico	
2026	Singer Gloria Trevi	Gloria Trevi	Mexico	

=== Spirit of Change Award ===
The Spirit of Change Award is presented to an artist who "drives positive change within music, society and beyond entertainment".

List of Spirit of Change Award recipients
Year	Image	Recipient	Nationality	Ref.
2024	Singer Kany García	Kany García	Puerto Rico	
2026	Singer Joy Huerta	Joy Huerta	Mexico	

=== Pioneer Award ===
The Pioneer Award is presented to an artist who "pioneered new paths, broken barriers and inspired future generations through their innovative artistry, cultural impact and enduring legacy".

List of Pioneer Award recipients
Year	Image	Recipient	Nationality	Ref.
2024	Singer La India	La India	Puerto Rico	
2026	Singer Ivy Queen	Ivy Queen	Puerto Rico	

=== Vanguard Award ===
The Vanguard Award is presented to an artist for their "groundbreaking contributions to Latin pop".

List of Vanguard Award recipients
Year	Image	Recipient	Nationality	Ref.
2025	Singer Anitta	Anitta	Brazil	

=== Impact Award ===
The Impact Award is presented to an artist for their "extraordinary contributions to the music industry and society".

List of Impact Award recipients
Year	Image	Recipient	Nationality	Ref.
2025	Singer Chiquis Rivera	Chiquis Rivera	United States	

=== Unstoppable Artist Award ===
The Unstoppable Artist Award is presented to an artist for their "sustained influence in the music industry".

List of Unstoppable Award recipients
Year	Image	Recipient	Nationality	Ref.
2025	Singer Natti Natasha	Natti Natasha	Dominican Republic	
2026	Singer Young Miko	Young Miko	Puerto Rico	

=== Unbreakable Award ===
The Unbreakable Award is presented for "collaboration between Latin women artists who have made an indelible impact on the music industry".

List of Unbreakable Award recipients
Year	Image	Recipient	Nationality	Ref.
2025	Musical duo Ha*Ash	Ha*Ash	United States	

=== Evolution Award ===
The Evolution Award is presented to an artist who has "demonstrated exceptional growth, transformation, and innovation throughout their artistic journey, and an enduring impact and commitment to evolving their vision and voice".

List of Evolution Award recipients
Year	Image	Recipient	Nationality	Ref.
2025	Entertainer Belinda	Belinda	Mexico	
2026	Singer Lola Índigo	Lola Índigo	Spain	

=== Artistic Excellence Award ===
The Artistic Excellence Award is presented to an artist whose "work is defined by exceptional craftsmanship, consistency, and a distinct creative identity".

List of Artistic Excellence Award recipients
Year	Image	Recipient	Nationality	Ref.
2026	Singer Julieta Venegas	Julieta Venegas	Mexico	

== See also ==
- Leading Ladies of Entertainment, a similar award presented by the Latin Recording Academy
- List of media awards honoring women
- Women in Latin music
