= Teen Choice Award for Choice Music – Break-Up Song =

Entertainment award category

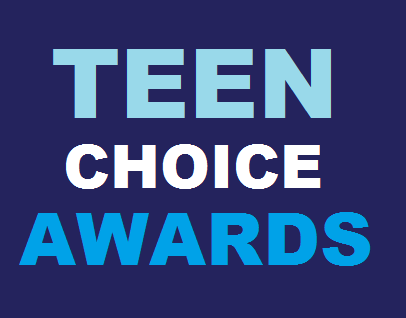
Teen Choice Award logo

The following is a list of Teen Choice Award winners and nominees for Choice Music - Break-Up Song. It was first given out in 2007 as Choice Music - Payback Track but was retitled in 2011. Taylor Swift is the only artist to win this award twice.

== Winners and nominees ==
=== 2007 ===
Year	Winner	Nominees	Ref.
2007	"What Goes Around... Comes Around" – Justin Timberlake	"Before He Cheats" – Carrie Underwood; "Irreplaceable" – Beyoncé; "Never Again" – Kelly Clarkson; "U + Ur Hand" – Pink	

=== 2010s ===
Year	Winner	Nominees	Ref.
2011	"Back to December" – Taylor Swift	"Forget You" – CeeLo Green; "Grenade" – Bruno Mars; "Rolling in the Deep" – Adele; "See No More" – Joe Jonas	
2012	"Payphone" – Maroon 5 featuring Wiz Khalifa	"Climax" – Usher; "Somebody That I Used to Know" – Gotye featuring Kimbra; "Stronger (What Doesn't Kill You)" – Kelly Clarkson; "Wide Awake" – Katy Perry	
2013	"Come & Get It" – Selena Gomez	"DONE." – The Band Perry; "Stay" – Rihanna featuring Mikky Ekko; "We Are Never Ever Getting Back Together" – Taylor Swift; "When I Was Your Man" – Bruno Mars	
2014	"Story of My Life" – One Direction	"Amnesia" – 5 Seconds of Summer; "Break Free" – Ariana Grande featuring Zedd; "Miss Movin' On" – Fifth Harmony; "Really Don't Care" – Demi Lovato featuring Cher Lloyd	
2015	"Bad Blood" – Taylor Swift featuring Kendrick Lamar	"Don't" – Ed Sheeran; "Ex's & Oh's" – Elle King; "The Heart Wants What It Wants" – Selena Gomez; "Lips Are Movin" – Meghan Trainor; "Where Are Ü Now" – Jack Ü featuring Justin Bieber	
2016	"Love Yourself" – Justin Bieber	"I Know What You Did Last Summer" – Shawn Mendes and Camila Cabello; "Never Forget You" – Zara Larsson and MNEK; "Same Old Love" – Selena Gomez; "Stone Cold" – Demi Lovato; "We Don't Talk Anymore" – Charlie Puth featuring Selena Gomez	
