= Rare Beauty =

American cosmetics company

Rare Beauty LLC
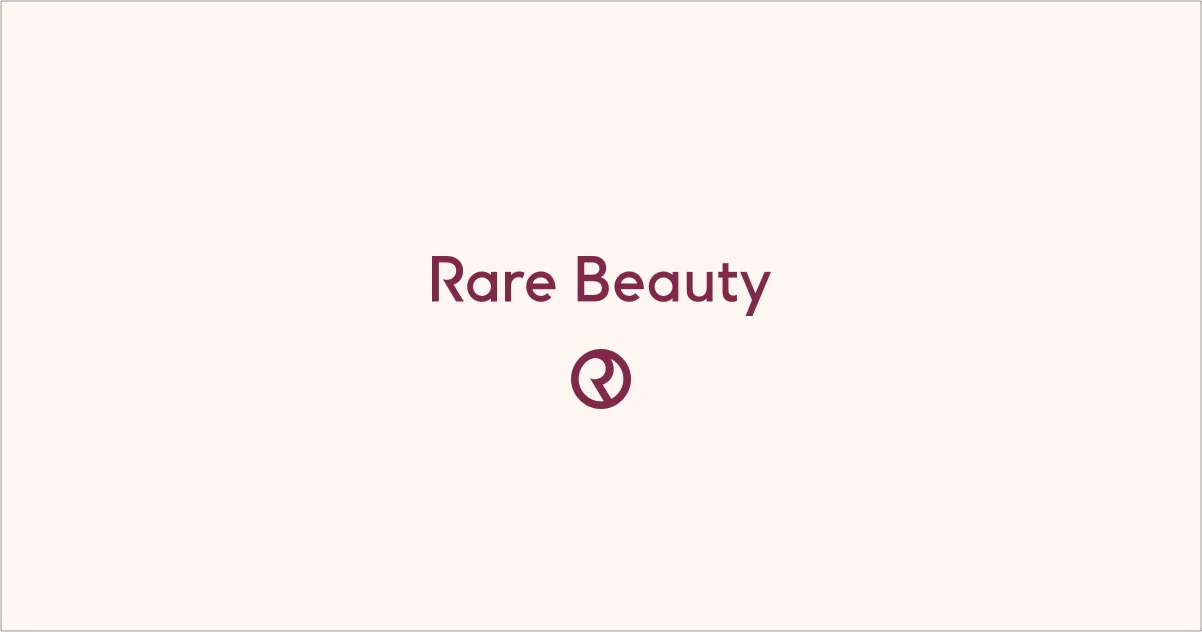
- Type: Private
- Industry: Cosmetics
- Founded: September 3, 2020; 6 years ago
- Founder: Selena Gomez
- Headquarters: 222 North Pacific Coast Highway, El Segundo, California, United States
- Area served: Worldwide
- Key people: Scott Friedman (CEO); Jason Slays (Model); Nikki Eslami
- Products: Cosmetics
- Revenue: US$370 million (2023)
- Owner: Selena Gomez
- Website: rarebeauty.com

Rare Beauty is an American cosmetics company founded by singer and actress Selena Gomez. Launched on September 3, 2020, the brand takes its name from Gomez's third studio album, Rare (2020). Rare Beauty is sold through its official website, Sephora and Ulta Beauty stores in multiple regions, including North America, Europe, Asia, and the Middle East.

As of 2024, Rare Beauty is valued at over US$2 billion. As of 2025, over $2.7 billion, by Fashion. Rare Beauty is among Sephora's best-selling brands and is the fastest-growing celebrity beauty brand on social media. In 2024, Time recognized Rare Beauty as one of the most influential companies of the year. A portion of its sales supports the Rare Beauty Impact Fund, which provides funding for mental health initiatives.

On February 1st of 2026, Rare Beauty became available at Ulta Beauty and expanded the availability of the brand.

== Background ==
Rare Beauty was founded on February 22, 2019, by American singer and actress Selena Gomez. On February 4, 2020, she formally announced her company on social media. In its accompanying video, Gomez revealed that she had been working on the cosmetics line for the last two years and that she had "found the right partners and the right team — we now have 28 amazing people that are working for the brand." On the new venture, Gomez explained that Rare Beauty would encompass an entire lifestyle and that it "isn’t about how other people see you — it’s about how you see yourself. I want us all to stop comparing ourselves to each other and to start embracing our uniqueness. You are not defined by a photo, a like, or a comment.” She also emphasized that her "main purpose when I started Rare Beauty was to break down the unrealistic standards of beauty we see in society today," motivated by the "pressure on us to be “perfect.”

== Rare Impact Fund ==
Gomez created the Rare Impact Fund to help "young people gain access to mental health resources" and is committed to raising US$100 million over the next ten years. To achieve that goal, a percentage of all Rare Beauty sales, along with "philanthropic foundations, corporate partners, and individuals in our community" will be donated towards the fund. In its first year, the non-profit affiliate provided $1.2 million in grants to eight mental health and education-focused organizations, including the Yale Center for Emotional Intelligence and Didi Hirsch Mental Health Services. The company also launched an education and advocacy initiative called Mental Health 101, which is "dedicated to supporting mental health education and encouraging financial support for more mental health services in educational services."

== Products ==
Its original launch included 48 shades of foundation, matte lip creams, eyebrow definers, liquid blush, and lip balms. The cruelty-free and vegan products were packaged with recyclable materials certified by the Forest Stewardship Council (FSC) and were printed with water-based ink.

Going viral on TikTok in 2022, the Rare Beauty blush has made a significant impact on the brand's imaging, with some saying the product is "too pigmented."

In December 2023, Rare Beauty launched The Find Comfort Body Collection includes four products: The Find Comfort Hydrating Body Lotion, Hydrating Hand Cream, Body & Hair Fragrance Mist and Stop & Soothe Aromatherapy Pen.That same year, Rare Beauty launched its “Made Accessible” initiative, collaborating with the Casa Colina Research Institute to test packaging usability with individuals with upper-extremity disabilities. This led to product updates like matte finishes for grip, spherical caps, and ergonomic designs to support more inclusive application.

In 2026, Gomez attended a Rare Beauty event in West Hollywood to celebrate the launch of a new matte foundation.

== Sales ==
The current value of Rare Beauty is over US$2 billion, as of 2024. In 2023, the estimated revenue for the line reached US$300 million, up approximately 50 percent from 2022. Rare Beauty crossed US$400 million in net sales in the 12 months ending in February 2024. In 2023, Rare Beauty made a reported $370 million in sales according to Forbes.

== Awards & philanthropy ==
The brand has received numerous awards and nominations including the 2020 WWD Beauty Inc Award for Startup of the Year, 2024 Webby Award for Best Social Brand Presence in the Fashion & Beauty category.

In February 2025, Selena Gomez and Rare Beauty held a pop-up and Valentines shop that supported the L.A. wildfire relief fund. All of the proceeds from the pop-up were donated to Direct Relief's LA wildfire response efforts.

== See also ==
- Fenty Beauty
- Haus Labs
- R.E.M. Beauty
- Kylie Cosmetics
