= Teen Choice Award for Choice Music – Female Artist =

Entertainment award category

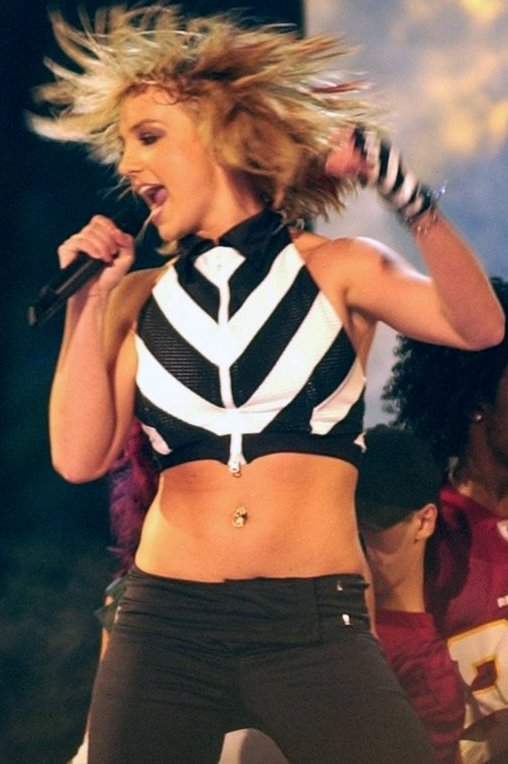
Britney Spears was the first three-time winner.

The following is a list of Teen Choice Award winners and nominees for Choice Music - Female Artist. Britney Spears, Kelly Clarkson, and Taylor Swift are the most awarded artists in this category with three wins each. Miley Cyrus is the youngest winner in 2008 at the age of 15. Fergie is the oldest winner in 2007 at the age of 32.

== Winners and nominees ==
=== 1999 ===
Year	Winner	Nominees	Ref.
1999	Brandy	Christina Aguilera; Mariah Carey; Faith Evans; Lauryn Hill; Monica; Britney Spears; Shania Twain	

=== 2000s ===
Year	Winner	Nominees	Ref.
2000	Britney Spears	Christina Aguilera; Mariah Carey; Missy Elliott; Macy Gray; Jennifer Lopez; Mandy Moore; Jessica Simpson	
2001	Britney Spears	Aaliyah; Christina Aguilera; Dido; Janet Jackson; Jennifer Lopez; Pink; Jessica Simpson	
2002	Britney Spears	Mary J. Blige; Janet Jackson; Alicia Keys; Jennifer Lopez; Alanis Morissette; Pink; Shakira	
2003	Kelly Clarkson	Christina Aguilera; Beyoncé; Missy Elliott; Norah Jones; Avril Lavigne; Jennifer Lopez; Pink	
2004	Avril Lavigne	Christina Aguilera; Beyoncé; Hilary Duff; Janet Jackson; Jennifer Lopez; Jessica Simpson; Britney Spears	
2005	Kelly Clarkson	Mariah Carey; Ciara; Alicia Keys; Avril Lavigne; Ashlee Simpson; Britney Spears; Gwen Stefani	
2006	Kelly Clarkson	Mary J. Blige; Mariah Carey; Rihanna; Shakira; Carrie Underwood	
2007	Fergie	Nelly Furtado; Rihanna; Gwen Stefani; Carrie Underwood	
2008	Miley Cyrus	Mariah Carey; Fergie; Rihanna; Britney Spears	
2009	Taylor Swift	Miley Cyrus; Lady Gaga; Katy Perry; Britney Spears	

=== 2010s ===
Year	Winner	Nominees	Ref.
2010	Lady Gaga	Miley Cyrus; Ke$ha; Shakira; Taylor Swift	
2011	Taylor Swift	Adele; Lady Gaga; Katy Perry; Rihanna	
2012	Taylor Swift	Adele; Jennifer Lopez; Katy Perry; Rihanna	
2013	Demi Lovato	Selena Gomez; P!nk; Rihanna; Taylor Swift	
2014	Ariana Grande	Beyoncé; Miley Cyrus; Lorde; Katy Perry; Taylor Swift	
2015	Demi Lovato	Iggy Azalea; Selena Gomez; Ariana Grande; Rihanna; Taylor Swift	
2016	Selena Gomez	Beyoncé; Ariana Grande; Demi Lovato; Rihanna; Taylor Swift	
2017	Ariana Grande	Alessia Cara; Miley Cyrus; Selena Gomez; Katy Perry; Hailee Steinfeld	
2018	Camila Cabello	Cardi B; Ariana Grande; Dua Lipa; Demi Lovato; Taylor Swift	
2019	Billie Eilish	Cardi B; Lauren Jauregui; Ariana Grande; Halsey; Taylor Swift	
