= Leading Ladies of Entertainment =

Accolade by the Latin Recording Academy

- Awarded for: "indelible impressions and contributions to the Latin entertainment industry"
- Presented by: The Latin Recording Academy
- First award: 2017
- Website: www.latingrammy.com

The Leading Ladies of Entertainment is an annual event organized by the Latin Recording Academy, the same body that distributes the Latin Grammy Awards, at which awards are presented to women "excelling in the arts and sciences, and who have made indelible impressions and contributions to the Latin entertainment industry." Award recipients are honored during "Latin Grammy Week", a string of events held prior to the annual Latin Grammy Awards ceremony. The accolade was established in 2017 by the organization to acknowledge the gender gap in the Latin entertainment industry.

Gabriel Abaroa, then-president of the Latin Recording Academy, explained at the inaugural event: "Women face a myriad of difficulties in the entertainment industry, but despite those obstacles, the women we are honoring have continually demonstrated perseverance, fortitude, and grace under pressure." A portion of the sponsorships on the events are used to fund scholarships to young women studying in music. The awards were first presented to Marcella Araica, Leila Cobo, Erika Ender, Rebeca León, Gabriela Martinez, and Jessica Rodriguez. The event was held twice in 2019, the first as a Mexican edition in June and again during the Latin Grammy Week in November.

== Recipients ==
Recipients
Year^{(Note: With the exception of the 2019 Mexican edition, each year is linked to an article about the Latin Grammy Awards ceremony of that year.)}	Image	Recipient	Occupation(s)	Ref.
2017	—	Marcella Araica	Audio engineer, mixer, and vice president of N.A.R.S Records and Dream Asylum Studios	
2017	Leila Cobo speaking in front of a microphone	Leila Cobo	Executive director of Content & Programming for Latin Music & Entertainment for Billboard	
2017	Erika Ender sitting down	Erika Ender	Singer-songwriter, composer, record producer, television personality	
2017	—	Rebeca León	CEO and founder of Lionfish Entertainment	
2017	—	Gabriela Martinez	General manager for Warner Music Latina and SVP Marketing Warner Music Latin America	
2017	—	Jessica Rodriguez	Executive vice president and chief marketing officer at Univision Communications.	
2018	Closeup image of Becky G facing the camera	Becky G	Singer, songwriter, and actress	
2018	—	Cynthia Darr Hudson	Senior vice president and general manager of CNN en Español and Hispanic Strategy for CNN U.S.	
2018	—	Delia Orjuela	Vice president creative for Latin music at Broadcast Music Inc.	
2018	Pamela Silva holding papers and facing right	Pamela Silva	Journalist and co-anchor of Primer Impacto	
2019 (Mexican edition)	Black-and-white image of Martha Debayle sitting on a chair	Martha Debayle	Announcer	
2019 (Mexican edition)	Tatiana Bilbao staring at a laptop in front of a crowd	Tatiana Bilbao	Architect	
2019 (Mexican edition)	Headshot of Joy Huerta facing left	Joy Huerta	Singer	
2019 (Mexican edition)	Alondra de la Parra facing up	Alondra de la Parra	Orchestra director	
2019 (Mexican edition)	—	Soumaya Slim Domit	Art expert	
2019	—	María Elisa Ayerbe	Audio engineer and producer	
2019	Close up image of Lila Downs performing on a stage	Lila Downs	Singer-songwriter and social activist	
2019	—	Luana Pagani	Music executive, president and partner of Seitrack US	
2019	Dayanara Torres in front a microphone	Dayanara Torres	Actress, model, author, and former Miss Universe	
2019	—	Elsa Yep	Chief financial officer and executive vice president of operations for Universal Music Latin America & Iberian Peninsula	
2020	Selena Gomez at a red carpet event	Selena Gomez	Recording artist, actress, film producer, and social activist	
2020	—	Angela N. Martinez	Entertainment attorney	
2020	Goyo performing on a stage	Goyo	Singer, producer and cofounder of ChocQuibTown	
2020	María Elena Salinas in a newsroom	María Elena Salinas	Broadcast journalist, news anchor, and author	
2021	—	Mayna Nevarez	Founder & CEO of Nevarez Communications	
2021	—	Mia Nygren	Managing director for Spotify Latin America region	
2021	Ivy Queen sitting on white stairs	Ivy Queen	Singer-songwriter	
2021	—	Mónica Vélez	Music composer	
2022	Kany García performing in front of a camera	Kany García	Singer and songwriter	
2022	—	Rocío Guerrero	Global head of Latin at Amazon Music	
2022	—	Rosa Lagarrigue	Founder and CEO of Spain's RLM	
2022	—	Janina Rosado	Pianist, musical director, record producer	
2023	—	Róndine Alcalá	Founder of RondenePR	
2023	Close up image of Mon Laferte facing right	Mon Laferte	Singer and songwriter	
2023	Closeup image of Simone Torres facing the camera	Simone Torres	Vocal producer	
2023	—	Ana Villacorta López	Director of international development and marketing	
2024	Vivir Quintana singing and performing with a guitar	Vivir Quintana	Singer and songwriter	
2024	—	Diana Rodríguez	CEO and founder of Criteria Entertainment	
2024	—	Ana Rosa Santiago	Senior vice president of Latin Music and LatAm for Universal Music Publishing Group	
2024	Closeup image of Julieta Venegas performing in front a microphone	Julieta Venegas	Singer and songwriter	
2025	—	Maricarmen Bou	Vice president of Sony Music Entertainment in Puerto Rico	
2025	—	Amarilys Germán	Entertainment executive and manager	
2025	—	Paula Kaminsky	Managing Director at Global Talent Services	
2025	Closeup image of Rozalén sitting down and performing	Rozalén	Singer and songwriter	
2026	—	María Fernández	Chief Operating Officer of Sony Music Entertainment Latin Iberia	
2026	—	Sandra Jiménez	Regional Director and Head of Music for Latin America and U.S. Latin at YouTube	
2026	—	Salomé Limón	producer, composer, sound enginee	
2026	Niña Pastori	Niña Pastori	Singer and songwriter	

== See also ==
- Billboard Latin Women in Music, a similar award presented by Billboard
- List of Latin Grammy Awards categories
- List of media awards honoring women
- Women in Latin music
