= Teen Choice Awards =

American popular-vote awards show (1999–2019)

- Country: United States
- Presented by: Fox
- Reward: Special surfboards
- First award: August 1, 1999; 27 years ago
- Final award: August 11, 2019; 7 years ago
- Website: www.teenchoiceawards.com

Television/radio coverage
- Network: Fox
- Runtime: 88–104 minutes

The Teen Choice Awards were an annual awards show that aired on the Fox television network between 1999 and 2019. The awards, based on a popularity vote that could be overridden by the producers – who reserved the right to choose the winners – covered over 250 different categories during its run, stated as honoring the year's biggest achievements in music, film, sports, television, fashion, social media, and more. Votes were submitted by viewers living in the United States, aged 13 and over, through various social media sites.

The awards show has been on an indefinite hiatus since the 2019 edition.

== History ==
Executive producers, Bob Bain and Michael Burg, came together to create an award show geared toward a teen demographic, somewhat older than that of the Nickelodeon Kids' Choice Awards, but similar to that of MTV. The format of the show has remained the same over the years, awarding the achievements of those in the entertainment and athletic industries with non-traditional categories fixed into the ceremony.

Ballots were once used in teen-oriented magazines, where readers were to purchase and tear out their ballot. Votes could also be cast online through the fox.com website. In 2008, Fox and the show's producers created Teenchoiceawards.com as the official website for the Teen Choice Awards. In 2009, the number of votes cast was in excess of 83 million. Votes are now cast online through Twitter, FOX.com, and the FOX NOW app. In 2016, more than 37 million votes were cast.

Since the ceremony's inception, the show has given out genuine custom-made surfboards to individual winners. The surfboard was chosen as the award because it represents the freedom of the summer vacation for teens. In 2009, Hugh Jackman, upon winning his first one, said that he was no longer the only Australian without a surfboard.

== Categories ==
These were the categories that were presented at the Teen Choice Awards from 1999 to 2019. This list also includes categories that were renamed, split, or grouped.

=== Movies ===
- Choice Movie Actor
- Choice Movie Actress
- Choice Drama Movie
- Choice Comedy Movie
- Choice Movie Sleazebag
- Choice Movie Breakout
- Choice Movie Hissy Fit
- Choice Movie Soundtrack
- Most Funniest Scene
- Most Disgusting Scene
- Sexiest Love Scene
- Choice Summer Movie
- Choice Breakout Movie Star
- Choice Movie Chemistry
- Choice Movie Liar
- Choice Summer Movie Wipeout
- Choice Movie: Drama/Action Adventure
- Choice Movie: Comedy
- Choice Movie: Horror/Thriller
- Choice Movie Fight
- Choice Movie Your Parents Didn't Want You to See
- Choice Movie Actor: Drama/Action Adventure
- Choice Movie Actress: Drama/Action Adventure
- Choice Movie Actor: Comedy
- Choice Movie Actress: Comedy
- Choice Breakout Movie Actor
- Choice Breakout Movie Actress
- Choice Movie Liplock
- Choice Movie Villain
- Choice Movie Fight/Action Sequence
- Choice Movie: Action Adventure
- Choice Date Movie
- Choice Thriller Movie
- Choice Movie Blush
- Choice Movie: Action
- Choice Movie Actor: Action/Thriller
- Choice Movie Actress: Action/Thriller
- Choice Movie Actor: Drama
- Choice Movie Actress: Drama
- Choice Movie: Thriller
- Choice Movie: Animated/Computer Generated
- Choice Movie: Male Breakout Star
- Choice Movie: Female Breakout Star
- Choice Movie: Rap Artist
- Choice Movie: Rumble
- Choice Movie: Blush Scene
- Choice Movie: Dance Scene
- Choice Movie: Rockstar Moment
- Choice Movie: Love Scene
- Choice Movie: Scary Scene
- Choice Movie: Scream Scene
- Choice Movie: Chick Flick
- Choice Summer Movie: Drama/Action Adventure
- Choice Summer Movie: Comedy
- Choice Action Movie
- Choice Action Movie Actor
- Choice Action Movie Actress
- Choice Drama Movie Actor
- Choice Drama Movie Actress
- Choice Comedy Movie Actor
- Choice Comedy Movie Actress
- Choice Horror/Thriller Movie
- Choice Horror/Thriller Movie Actor
- Choice Horror/Thriller Movie Actress
- Choice Chick Flick
- Choice Movie Dance
- Choice Summer Movie: Comedy/Musical
- Choice Movie: Romantic Comedy
- Choice Movie Actor: Horror/Thriller
- Choice Movie Actor: Horror/Thriller
- Choice Summer Movie Action
- Choice Movie: Romance
- Choice Movie: Bromantic Comedy
- Choice Movie: Music/Dance
- Choice Movie Actor: Music/Dance
- Choice Movie Actress: Music/Dance
- Choice Movie: Male Fresh Face
- Choice Movie: Female Fresh Face
- Choice Summer Movie: Action
- Choice Summer Movie: Drama
- Choice Summer Movie: Romance
- Choice Summer Movie Star: Male
- Choice Summer Movie Star: Female
- Choice Movie: Sci-Fi
- Choice Movie Actor: Sci-Fi
- Choice Movie Actress: Sci-Fi
- Choice Movie: Fantasy
- Choice Movie Actor: Fantasy
- Choice Movie Actress: Fantasy
- Choice Movie: Romantic Comedy
- Choice Movie Actor: Romantic Comedy
- Choice Movie Actress: Romantic Comedy
- Choice Movie: Animated
- Choice Movie: Dance
- Choice Movie: Male Scene Stealer
- Choice Movie: Female Scene Stealer
- Choice Movie: Sci-Fi/Fantasy
- Choice Movie Actor: Sci-Fi/Fantasy
- Choice Movie Actress: Sci-Fi/Fantasy
- Choice Movie: Voice
- Choice Movie: Scene Stealer Male
- Choice Movie: Scene Stealer Female
- Choice Summer Movie: Comedy/Music
- Choice Movie: Scene Stealer
- Choice Movie: Summer
- Choice Movie Actor: Summer
- Choice Movie Actress: Summer
- Choice Movie: AnTEENcipated
- Choice Movie Actor: AnTEENcipated
- Choice Movie Actress: AnTEENcipated
- Choice Sci-Fi Movie
- Choice Sci-Fi Movie Actor
- Choice Sci-Fi Movie Actress
- Choice Fantasy Movie
- Choice Fantasy Movie Actor
- Choice Fantasy Movie Actress
- Choice Movie Ship
- Choice Breakout Movie Star
- Choice Summer Movie Actor
- Choice Summer Movie Actress

=== Television ===
- Choice TV Actor
- Choice TV Actress
- Choice TV Drama
- Choice TV Comedy
- Choice TV Breakout
- Choice Drama TV Show
- Choice Comedy TV Show
- Choice Breakout TV Show
- Choice TV Personality
- Choice TV Sidekick
- Choice Reality TV Show
- Choice Late Night TV Show
- Choice Drama TV Show
- Choice Drama TV Actor
- Choice Drama TV Actress
- Choice Comedy TV Actor
- Choice Comedy TV Actress
- Choice Breakout TV Star: Male
- Choice Breakout TV Star: Female
- Choice TV Drama/Action Adventure
- Choice TV Actor: Drama/Action Adventure
- Choice TV Actress: Drama/Action Adventure
- Choice TV Actor: Comedy
- Choice TV Actress: Comedy
- Choice TV Dating
- Choice TV Reality
- Choice Reality/Variety TV Star: Male
- Choice Reality/Variety TV Star: Female
- Choice Reality/Variety TV Host
- Choice Reality Hunk
- Choice Reality Babe
- Choice TV Late Night
- Choice Breakout TV Actor
- Choice Breakout TV Actress
- Choice TV Show: Drama
- Choice TV Actor: Drama
- Choice TV Actress: Drama
- Choice TV Show: Comedy
- Choice TV Show: Reality
- Choice TV: Male Reality/Variety Star
- Choice TV: Female Reality/Variety Star
- Choice TV: Breakout Show
- Choice TV: Male Breakout Star
- Choice TV: Female Breakout Star
- Choice TV: Chemistry
- Choice TV: Sidekick
- Choice TV: Male Personality
- Choice TV: Female Personality
- Choice TV: Parental Unit
- Choice Summer TV Show
- Choice TV Show: Comedy/Musical
- Choice TV: Male Reality Star
- Choice TV: Female Reality Star
- Choice TV Show: Animated
- Choice TV: Breakout Star
- Choice TV: Breakout Show
- Choice TV Show: Reality Dance
- Choice TV Show: Reality Music Competition
- Choice TV Show: Reality Beauty/Makeover
- Choice TV Show: Celebrity Reality
- Choice TV Show: Looking For Love
- Choice TV Show: Reality Competition
- Choice TV: Game Show
- Choice TV: Personality
- Choice TV: Villain
- Choice TV Show: Action
- Choice TV Actor: Action
- Choice TV Actress: Action
- Choice TV Show: Late Night
- Choice TV: Fab-u-lous
- Choice Summer TV Star: Male
- Choice Summer TV Star: Female
- Choice TV Show: Fantasy/Sci-Fi
- Choice TV Actor: Fantasy/Sci-Fi
- Choice TV Actress: Fantasy/Sci-Fi
- Choice TV Show: Sci-Fi/Fantasy
- Choice TV Actor: Sci-Fi/Fantasy
- Choice TV Actress: Sci-Fi/Fantasy
- Choice TV Animated Show
- Choice TV: Male Scene Stealer
- Choice TV: Female Scene Stealer
- Choice TV Personality: Male
- Choice TV Personality: Female
- Choice TV Breakout Performance - Male
- Choice TV Breakout Performance - Female
- Choice TV Show: Animated
- Choice TV: Male Reality Performance
- Choice TV: Female Reality Performance
- Choice TV Actor: Summer
- Choice TV Actress: Summer
- Choice Throwback TV Show
- Choice TV Ship
- Choice Drama TV Show
- Choice Drama TV Actor
- Choice Drama TV Actress
- Choice Sci-Fi/Fantasy TV Show
- Choice Sci-Fi/Fantasy TV Actor
- Choice Sci-Fi/Fantasy TV Actress
- Choice Action TV Show
- Choice Action TV Actor
- Choice Action TV Actress
- Choice Comedy TV Show
- Choice Comedy TV Actor
- Choice Comedy TV Actress
- Choice Animated TV Show
- Choice Reality TV Show
- Choice Summer TV Star

=== Music ===
- Choice Male Artist
- Choice Female Artist
- Choice Music Group
- Choice Music Single
- Choice Music Album
- Choice Rap Track
- Choice Love Song
- Choice Breakout Artist
- Choice Music Video
- Choice Summer Song
- Choice Pop Group
- Choice Rock Group
- Choice Single
- Choice Album
- Choice R&B/Hip-Hop Track
- Choice R&B/Hip-Hop Artist
- Choice Rock Track
- Choice Dance Track
- Choice Concert
- Choice R&B/Hip-Hop/Rap Artist
- Choice Breakout Music Artist
- Choice Music Hook Up (collaboration)
- Choice Rap Artist
- Choice R&B Artist
- Choice Music Tour
- Choice Music: Male Artist
- Choice Music: Female Artist
- Choice Music: R&B Artist
- Choice Music: Rap Artist
- Choice Music: Rock Group
- Choice Music: Single
- Choice Music: Album
- Choice Music: R&B/Hip-Hop Track
- Choice Music: Rap Track
- Choice Music: Rock Track
- Choice Music: Love Song
- Choice Music: Male Breakout Artist
- Choice Music: Female Breakout Artist
- Choice Music: Party Starter
- Choice Music: Collaboration
- Choice Music: Make-Out Song
- Choice Music: V-Cast Artist
- Choice Payback Track
- Choice Breakout Group
- Choice Summer Music Star
- Choice Music: Breakout Artist
- Choice Music: Hook Up
- Choice Music Album: Male
- Choice Music Album: Female
- Choice Music Album: Group
- Choice Music: Soundtrack
- Choice Music: Tour
- Choice Music: Country Group
- Choice Music: Male Country Artist
- Choice Music: Female Country Artist
- Choice Music: Country Song
- Choice Music: Country Album
- Choice Music: Rap Album
- Choice Music: Rock Album
- Choice Music: Pop Album
- Choice Music: R&B Album
- Choice Music: Country Artist Male
- Choice Music: Country Artist Female
- Choice Music: Country Track
- Choice Music: Break-Up Song
- Choice Country Music Artist: Male
- Choice Country Music Artist: Female
- Choice Country Group
- Choice EDM Artist
- Choice Single: Male
- Choice Single: Female
- Choice Single: Group
- Choice Country Song
- Choice Music: Breakout Group
- Choice Summer Music Group
- Choice Music: Hip-Hop/Rap Artist
- Choice Music: Electronic Dance Music Artist
- Choice Music: R&B/Hip-Hop Song
- Choice Summer Tour
- Choice Music: Electronic Music Dance Song
- Choice Music Group: Male
- Choice Music Group: Female
- Choice Music: Country Artist
- Choice Music Single: Male Artist
- Choice Music Single: Female Artist
- Choice Music Single: Group
- Choice Music: International Artist
- Choice Music: Party Song
- Choice Music: Next Big Thing
- Choice Music: Song from a Movie or TV Show
- Choice Music: Summer Song
- Choice Summer Music Artist: Male
- Choice Summer Music Artist: Female
- Choice Music: Summer Group
- Choice Music: Summer Tour
- Choice Country Artist
- Choice Electronic/Dance Artist
- Choice Latin Artist
- Choice Music Collaboration
- Choice Pop Song
- Choice Country Song
- Choice Electronic/Dance Song
- Choice Latin Song
- Choice Rock/Alternative Song
- Choice Next Big Thing
- Choice Summer Male Artist
- Choice Summer Female Artist
- Choice Summer Group
- Choice Summer Music Tour
- Choice International Artist
- Choice Song From A Movie

=== Sports ===
- Choice Male Athlete
- Choice Female Athlete
- Choice Male Extreme Athlete
- Choice Female Extreme Athlete
- Choice Extreme Athlete
- Choice Action Sports: Male
- Choice Action Sports: Female
- Choice Male Action Sports Athlete
- Choice Female Action Sports Athlete
- Choice Athlete: Male
- Choice Athlete: Female
- Choice Sports Team

=== Web/Digital ===
- Choice Social Network
- Choice MySpacer
- Choice Twitter Personality
- Choice Web Star: Male
- Choice Web Star: Female
- Choice Web Star: Comedy
- Choice Web Star: Music
- Choice Web Star: Fashion/Beauty
- Choice Web Star: Gaming
- Choice Web: Collaboration
- Choice Social Media King
- Choice Social Media Queen
- Choice Twit
- Choice Instagrammer
- Choice Viner
- Choice Fanatic Fans
- Choice YouTuber
- Choice Fandom
- Choice Snapchatter
- Choice Muser
- Choice Male Web Star
- Choice Female Web Star
- Choice Gamer
- Choice Fashion/Beauty Web Star
- Choice Music Web Star
- Choice Social Star

=== Miscellaneous ===
- Choice Male Hottie
- Choice Female Hottie
- Choice Comedian
- Choice Professional Wrestler
- Choice Model
- Choice Crossover Artist
- Choice Male Fashion Icon
- Choice Female Fashion Icon
- Choice Male Red Carpet Fashion Icon
- Choice Female Red Carpet Fashion Icon
- Choice It Girl
- Choice Celebrity Activist
- Choice Celebrity Dancer
- Choice Celebrity Fashion Line
- Choice V-Cast
- Choice Video Game
- Choice Grill
- Choice OMG! Moment
- Choice V-Cast Video
- Choice Celebrity Pet
- Choice Celebrity Baby
- Choice Celebrity Slime
- Choice American Idol Alum
- Choice Vampire
- Choice Hottie: Male
- Choice Hottie: Female
- Choice Book
- Choice Smile
- Choice Style Icon
- Fashion Trendsetter
- Choice Candie's Style Icon
- Choice Dancer
- Choice Selfie Taker
- Choice Style: Male
- Choice Style: Female
- Choice Changemaker

== Ceremonies ==
Teen Choice Awards ceremonies
#	Date	Venue	City	Host(s)	Performers
1st	August 1, 1999	Barker Hangar	Santa Monica, California	None (Britney Spears introduced the show)	Christina Aguilera; Blink-182; NSYNC and Gloria Estefan; Britney Spears
2nd	August 6, 2000	Barker Hangar	Santa Monica, California	None (Freddie Prinze, Jr. introduced the show)	98 Degrees; BBMAK; No Doubt; Enrique Iglesias
3rd	August 12, 2001	Universal Amphitheatre (later known as Gibson Amphitheatre)	Universal City, California	None (Destiny's Child introduced the show)	Moulin Huge; Aaron Carter and Nick Carter; Usher; Eve feat. Gwen Stefani; Shaggy
4th	August 19, 2002	Universal Amphitheatre (later known as Gibson Amphitheatre)	Universal City, California	None (Britney Spears and Verne Troyer introduced the show)	Nelly; Jennifer Love Hewitt; BBMak; Ashanti
5th	August 2, 2003	Universal Amphitheatre (later known as Gibson Amphitheatre)	Universal City, California	David Spade	Kelly Clarkson; Evanescence; The Donnas
6th	August 8, 2004	Universal Amphitheatre (later known as Gibson Amphitheatre)	Universal City, California	Paris Hilton; Nicole Richie	Blink-182; JoJo; Lenny Kravitz; Ashlee Simpson
7th	August 14, 2005	Universal Amphitheatre (later known as Gibson Amphitheatre)	Universal City, California	Hilary Duff; Rob Schneider	Gwen Stefani; The Black Eyed Peas; The Pussycat Dolls; Simple Plan
8th	August 20, 2006	Universal Amphitheatre (later known as Gibson Amphitheatre)	Universal City, California	Dane Cook; Jessica Simpson	Nelly Furtado feat. Timbaland; Rihanna; Kevin Federline
9th	August 26, 2007	Universal Amphitheatre (later known as Gibson Amphitheatre)	Universal City, California	Hilary Duff; Nick Cannon	Avril Lavigne; Kelly Clarkson; Fergie; Shop Boyz
10th	August 4, 2008	Universal Amphitheatre (later known as Gibson Amphitheatre)	Universal City, California	Miley Cyrus	Miley Cyrus; Mariah Carey
11th	August 9, 2009	Universal Amphitheatre (later known as Gibson Amphitheatre)	Universal City, California	Jonas Brothers	Jonas Brothers; Sean Kingston; Miley Cyrus; The Black Eyed Peas
12th	August 8, 2010	Universal Amphitheatre (later known as Gibson Amphitheatre)	Universal City, California	Katy Perry; Cory Monteith; Mark Salling; Chris Colfer; Kevin McHale	Jason Derulo; Travie McCoy feat. Bruno Mars; Katy Perry; Justin Bieber; Diddy – Dirty Money
13th	August 7, 2011	Universal Amphitheatre (later known as Gibson Amphitheatre)	Universal City, California	Kaley Cuoco	will.i.am; Selena Gomez & the Scene; Jason Derulo; OneRepublic
14th	July 22, 2012	Universal Amphitheatre (later known as Gibson Amphitheatre)	Universal City, California	Demi Lovato; Kevin McHale	No Doubt; Flo Rida; Justin Bieber; Carly Rae Jepsen
15th	August 11, 2013	Universal Amphitheatre (later known as Gibson Amphitheatre)	Universal City, California	Darren Criss; Lucy Hale	One Direction; Florida Georgia Line feat. Nelly; Demi Lovato; Paramore
16th	August 10, 2014	Shrine Auditorium	Los Angeles, California	Tyler Posey; Sarah Hyland	Demi Lovato feat. Cher Lloyd; Magic!; Rixton; Becky G; Jason Derulo
17th	August 16, 2015	Galen Center	Los Angeles, California	Gina Rodriguez; Josh Peck; Ludacris	5 Seconds of Summer; Little Mix; Jussie Smollett and Bryshere Y. Gray; Rachel Platten; Flo Rida feat. Robin Thicke
18th	July 31, 2016	The Forum	Inglewood, California	John Cena; Victoria Justice	Charlie Puth; Serayah; Flo Rida; Ne-Yo; Jason Derulo
19th	August 13, 2017	Galen Center	Los Angeles, California	None (Logan Paul introduced the show)	Kyle feat. Lil Yachty; Rita Ora; Clean Bandit feat. Zara Larsson; French Montana feat. Swae Lee; Louis Tomlinson feat. Bebe Rexha
20th	August 12, 2018	The Forum	Inglewood, California	Nick Cannon; Lele Pons	Meghan Trainor; Lauv; Foster the People; Bebe Rexha; Evvie McKinney; Khalid
21st	August 11, 2019	Hermosa Beach, California (temporary outdoor set)		Lucy Hale; David Dobrik	OneRepublic; Blanco Brown; Mabel; Jordan McGraw and Sarah Hyland; CNCO; Zhavia Ward

=== Venues ===
The show was held at the Barker Hangar at Santa Monica Airport for its first two shows in 1999 and 2000. From 2001 to 2013, it was held at the Universal Amphitheatre (later known as Gibson Amphitheatre) in Universal City, California. With the demolition of the amphitheater in 2013, the show moved to a new location. Then after the remodeled Pauley Pavilion at UCLA in Westwood, Los Angeles, was flooded by a broken 30-inch (760 mm) water pipe on July 29, 2014, the show was moved to the Shrine Auditorium in Los Angeles. The 2015 and 2017 ceremonies were held at The Galen Center (USC), and the 2016 and 2018 ceremonies were held at the refurbished Forum in Inglewood. The 2019 ceremony was held at an outdoor set in Hermosa Beach, California.

== Special awards ==
Extraordinary Achievement

- 2000: Serena Williams and Venus Williams
- 2001: Sarah Michelle Gellar
- 2002: Reese Witherspoon

Courage Award

- 2004: Bethany Hamilton
- 2006: Jason McElwain

Ultimate Choice Award

- 2004: Mike Myers
- 2007: Justin Timberlake
- 2009: Britney Spears
- 2011: Taylor Swift
- 2012: The Twilight Saga
- 2013: Ashton Kutcher
- 2014: Selena Gomez
- 2017: Miley Cyrus

Visionary Award

- 2005: Gwen Stefani
- 2017: Bruno Mars

Acuvue Inspire Award

- 2011: Demi Lovato
- 2012: Miranda Cosgrove
- 2013: Nick Jonas

Candie's Style Icon

- 2013: Miley Cyrus
- 2014: Zendaya
- 2015: Britney Spears

Decade Award

- 2016: Justin Timberlake
- 2017: Maroon 5
- 2019: Jonas Brothers

See Her

- 2017: Vanessa Hudgens

Icon Award

- 2019: Taylor Swift

Note: Special Awards are not given every year.

== Most wins ==
The following artists have won 10 or more awards.

Wins	Artist	Awards
28	One Direction	Choice Music: Breakout Group, Choice Love Song (5), Choice Summer Music Star: Group (2), Choice Music Group (3), Choice Single: Group (3), Choice Summer Tour (3), Choice Social Media King, Choice Twit, Choice Break-Up Song, Choice Fanatic Fans, Choice Male Hottie (2), Choice Music: Song: Group, Choice Music: Male Group, Choice Selfie Taker, Choice Party Song, Choice Fandom
26	Taylor Swift	Choice Breakout Artist, Choice Female Artist (3), Choice Female Album, Choice Breakout Star: Female, Choice Female Country Artist (5), Choice Country Song (4), Choice Country Album, Red Carpet Hot Icon: Female, Ultimate Choice, Choice Break-Up Song (2), Choice Voice, Choice Single: Female Artist, Choice Summer Music Star: Female, Choice Twit, Choice Music Collaboration, Icon Award
23	Justin Bieber	Choice Male Artist (5), Choice Summer Music Star Male (2), Choice Music: Pop Album, Choice Music: Breakout Artist Male, Choice Male Hottie, Choice Red Carpet Fashion Icon: Male, Choice TV: Villain, Choice Twit (2), Choice Single: Male Artist (3), Choice Twitter Personality, Choice Break-Up Song, Choice Social Media King, Choice Music: Latin Song, Choice Summer Song, Choice Music: R&B/Hip-Hop Song
19	Miley Cyrus	Choice Female Artist, Choice Hissy Fit (2), Choice TV Actress: Comedy (3), Choice Love Song, Choice Single, Choice Summer Song (2), Choice Movie Actress: Music/Dance, Choice Instagrammer, Choice Female Hottie, Choice Scene Stealer: Female, Choice Style Icon, Candie's Fashion Trendsetter, Choice Fashion: Celebrity Line, Choice Actress: Drama, Ultimate Choice Award
18	Selena Gomez	Choice Break-Up Song, Choice Female Hottie (3), Choice TV Actress: Comedy (2), Choice Summer Music Star: Female (2), Choice Summer TV Star: Female, Choice Red Carpet Fashion Icon: Female (2), Choice Celebrity Dancer, Ultimate Choice Award, Choice Female Artist, Choice Instagrammer (3), Choice Summer Song
17	Jonas Brothers	Choice Music: Breakout Group, Choice Red Carpet Icon: Male (3), Choice Male Hottie, Choice Single, Choice Love Song, Choice Summer Song (2), Choice Fanatic Fans, Choice TV Actor: Comedy (2), Choice Breakout Show, Choice Album: Group, Choice Summer Group, Decade Award
15	Ashton Kutcher	Choice Reality Hunk, Choice Reality/Variety TV Star: Male (2), Choice TV Actor, Choice TV Personality (2), Choice TV Male Personality, Choice TV Actor: Comedy (2), Choice Movie Rockstar Moment, Choice Movie Actor: Comedy, Choice Movie Actor: Romantic Comedy (3), Ultimate Choice Award
14	Demi Lovato	Choice Female Artist (2), Choice Summer Music Star: Female (2), Choice Summer Song (2), Choice Single: Female Artist, Choice Music Tour (with David Archuleta), Choice TV Breakout Star: Female, Choice TV Personality: Female, Choice Style Icon, Choice Twit, Acuvue Inspire Award, Choice Country Song
14	Zac Efron	Choice Male Actor: Comedy (3), Choice Movie Actor: Drama (2), Choice Movie Actor: Romance, Choice Movie Actor: Music/Dance, Choice Male Hottie, Choice Rockstar Moment, Choice Breakout TV Star, Choice Collaboration, Choice TV Chemistry, Choice Movie Ship, Choice Male Red Carpet Fashion Icon
12	Ariana Grande	Choice Music: Female Artist (2), Choice Song: Female Artist (3), Choice Instagrammer, Choice Pop Song, Choice Selfie Taker, Choice Snapchatter (2), Choice Summer Tour, Choice Changemaker
11	Britney Spears	Choice Female Artist (3), Choice Female Hottie (3), Choice Single (2), Choice OMG! Moment, Ultimate Teen Choice Award (Lifetime Achievement Award), Candie's Choice Style Icon
11	Eminem	Choice Music: Male Artist, Choice Music: Rap Artist (3), Choice Movie: Drama Actor, Choice Movie: Breakout Actor, Choice Music: Rap Track (2), Choice Music: Rap Album, Choice Music: Rap/Hip-Hop Track, Choice Music: R&B/Hip-Hop Artist
11	Kristen Stewart	Choice Movie: Liplock (3), Choice Movie: Romance Actress (2), Choice Movie: Sci-Fi/Fantasy Actress (2), Choice Movie: Summer Actress (2), Choice Movie: Drama Actress, Choice Movie: Chemistry
11	Paramore	Choice Music: Breakout Group, Choice Music: Rock Group (5), Choice Rock Track (4), Choice Rock Album
11	Robert Pattinson	Choice Movie: Liplock (3), Choice Movie: Drama Actor (3), Choice Male Hottie, Choice Movie: Rumble, Choice Movie: Summer Actor, Choice Vampire, Choice Movie: Chemistry
10	Justin Timberlake	Choice Music: Male Artist (2), Choice Hottie Male (3), Choice Movie: Comedy Actor, Choice Music: Payback Track, Choice Music: R&B/Hip-Hop Track, Ultimate Choice Award, Decade Award
10	Fifth Harmony	Choice Summer Song (2), Choice Music Group: Female, Choice Female Hottie, Choice Social Media Queen, Choice Song: Movie or TV, Choice Music Group, Choice Song: Group, Choice Summer Group, Choice Fandom

== Records ==
=== Wins ===
- Most wins overall – One Direction – 28
- Most wins by an individual – Taylor Swift – 26
- Oldest winner – Betty White – 88 years, 203 days (Choice Movie Dance)
- Youngest winner – Rosie McClelland – 5 years, 319 days (Choice Web Star)
- Most wins by a television series – Pretty Little Liars – 38
- Most consecutive wins in the same category – Nina Dobrev – 6 (Choice Sci-Fi/Fantasy TV Actress)

=== Nominations ===
- Most nominations overall – Taylor Swift, tied with Selena Gomez – 61 – (Gomez has 54 individually, 7 with Selena Gomez & the Scene)
- Most nominations by an individual – Taylor Swift – 61
- Most nominations by a television series – The Vampire Diaries – 67
- Most nominations by a film series – The Twilight Saga – 59 (Twilight, New Moon, Eclipse, Breaking Dawn – Part 1, Breaking Dawn – Part 2)
- Most nominations by a film – The Twilight Saga: Eclipse – 16 (Note: The Twilight Saga: Eclipse was nominated for 4 awards in the Summer Movie categories in 2009 and 12 awards in the standard Movie categories in 2010.)
- Most consecutive nominations in the same category – Taylor Swift – 8 (Choice Female Artist)
- Most nominations by an individual without a win – Mila Kunis – 17
- Most nominations by a television series without a win – Lost – 32

== Do Something ==
In 2008, Dosomething.org sponsored the Do Something Award—which recognized young people. Nine nominees—who saw a problem in the world and then tackled it—each won $10,000 for their cause. The winner received $100,000. The Do Something Award (formerly the BR!CK Awards) is a program of Do Something, a New York-based non-profit that reaches about 11.5 million young people annually. The award was not presented in 2009. It was replaced with "Choice Celebrity Activist", which was won by Hayden Panettiere.

== Controversy ==
On August 11, 2014, after losing his category, Vine star Cameron Dallas tweeted that the awards ceremony was "rigged", saying that he had been informed six days prior to the actual event that he had won the award, and the runners-up were told to still try to solicit votes from their followers, even though the results had already been decided. He also tweeted "So I found out that the Teen Choice Awards were rigged and used powerful internet people for marketing. I'm sad now. Television is stupid" before deleting the tweets, saying he "should have taken the high road", but he "didn't like the fact that [his fans] were being lied to". Soon after Dallas' initial tweets, Vine star Carter Reynolds stated that the Teen Choice Awards had "used everyone for promotion", using the hashtag "#TeensDontHaveAChoiceAwards", which soon began trending by fans who noticed the disclaimer at the end of the show saying that the producers reserved the right to choose the winners.

In earlier years of the show, the voting rules page stated "Teenasaurus Rox reserves the right to choose the winner from the top four vote generators".

In 2016, controversy started on Twitter when fans became upset when they found out that late pop singer Christina Grimmie won the award for Choice Web Star: Music but was not mentioned during the show. Many fans felt that the award show should have been dedicated to her memory or at least for a moment of recognition.
